= Idoli discography =

- Studio albums: 2
- Extended plays: 1
- Soundtrack albums: 1
- Compilation albums: 2
- Singles: 4
- Music videos: 8

The discography of the Serbian rock band Idoli (Serbian Cyrillic: Идоли; trans. The Idols), consists of two studio albums, one EP, five singles and two compilation albums.

The band released their first recordings on the double A-side single "Pomoć, pomoć" / "Retko te viđam sa devojkama", released with the May 1980 copy of the Vidici magazine. A newly recorded version of "Retko te viđam sa devojkama" appeared as a B-side of the band second single "Maljčiki", released in 1981. During the same year, with the new drummer Kokan Popović, the band released the highly successful EP VIS Idoli. In the meantime, the band appeared on the Paket aranžman compilation, with Električni Orgazam and Šarlo Akrobata. The release is considered one of the greatest releases of Yugoslav pop and rock music, being second behind the Idoli debut album Odbrana i poslednji dani, recorded in the late 1981 and released in early 1982, as voted by the Džuboks magazine in 1985. The album, one of the first Yugoslav rock concept albums, despite making split opinions by the critics, did not repeat the commercial success of the previous releases. The second studio album, Čokolada, recorded in London with the new bassist Branko Isaković, featuring the single "Bambina", became the band's greatest commercial success, selling around 350,000 copies, and one of the highest selling albums in SFR Yugoslavia. During the album promotional tour, due to a quarrel between the band members, Idoli split up. The last release under the Idoli band name was Šest dana juna, a soundtrack for the movie of the same name, on which appeared numerous musicians. The single from the release, "Ona to zna", became a nationwide hit. After the album release, the band members pursued solo careers.

In 1990, both Paket aranžman and Odbrana i poslednji dani were rereleased on CD, being one of the first albums released in the format in former Yugoslavia. In 2007, Croatia Records, rereleased Paket aranžman and all Idoli releases except for the Vidici single on the VIS Idoli box set.

== Albums ==
=== Studio albums ===
Year	Album details
1982	Odbrana i poslednji dani: Released: 1982; Label: Jugoton; Format: LP, CS, CD
1983	Čokolada: Released: 1983; Label: Jugoton; Format: LP, CS, CD
1985	Šest dana juna: Released: 1985; Label: Jugoton; Format: LP, CS, CD

=== Compilation albums ===
Year	Album details
1981	Paket aranžman (with Šarlo Akrobata and Električni Orgazam): Released: 1981; Label: Jugoton; Format: LP, CS, CD
2007	VIS Idoli: Released: 2007; Label: Croatia Records; Format: CD

== EPs ==
Year	Album details
1981	VIS Idoli: Released: 1981; Label: Jugoton; Format: EP, CS, CD

== Singles ==
Year	Single details
1981	"Pomoć, pomoć" / "Retko te viđam sa devojkama": B-side: "Poklon"; From the album: Non-album single; Released: 1980; Label: Izgled; Format: 7"
1981	"Maljčiki": B-side: "Retko te viđam sa devojkama"; From the album: Non-album single; Released: 1981; Label: Jugoton; Format: 7"
1983	"Bambina": B-side: "Stranac u noći"; From the album: Čokolada; Released: 1983; Label: Jugoton; Format: 7"
1983	"Ona to zna": B-side: "Ljubavi"; From the album: Šest dana juna; Released: 1985; Label: Jugoton; Format: 7"

== Music videos ==
Song
1981	"Maljčiki"
1981	"Zašto su danas devojke ljute" (two versions)
1981	"Malena"
1981	"Devojko mala (two versions)"
1981	"Ime Da Da"
1985	"A kad te vidim ja"
