= Propaganda (Yugoslav band) =

- Origin: Belgrade, SR Serbia, SFR Yugoslavia
- Genres: New wave; synth-pop; pop rock
- Years active: 1981–1982
- Label: PGP-RTB
- Past members: Kokan Popović; Dragan Mitrić; Branko Isaković; Nenad Morgenstern

Propaganda (Serbian Cyrillic: Пропаганда) was a Yugoslav new wave band formed in Belgrade in 1981. Formed by former Zvuk Ulice and Bulevar members, Propaganda released only one album, Apatija javnosti, and disbanded. After the group ended its activity, Propaganda guitarist and vocalist Kokan Popović continued his career with the band Idoli, where he was soon joined by Propaganda bass guitarist Branko Isaković. Despite being short-lived, Propaganda was a prominent act of the Yugoslav new wave scene.

== History ==
=== Zvuk Ulice ===
The roots of Propaganda can be found in the mid-1970s band called Zvuk Ulice (Sound of the Street). Zvuk Ulice was formed in 1976 by Vlada Divljan (guitar, vocals), Zdenko Kolar (bass guitar), Kokan Popović (drums), Dragan Mitrić (keyboards), Bora Antić (saxophone) and Dragana Milković (piano, vocals). At first Divljan only played the guitar and later also did vocals.

The band performed cover versions of The Beatles, The Rolling Stones, Jimi Hendrix, as well as their own songs, mostly instrumentals. The band's sound was described as a combination of melodic rock and jazz rock, but Zdenko Kolar stated in an interview that it was the sound that in the early 1980s would definitely be described as new wave. They had recording sessions in Radio Belgrade studios, and the recordings were often broadcast on the radio.

In 1978, the band performed at the last edition of BOOM Festival, held in Novi Sad, and in 1979 competed at the Gitarijada festival in Zaječar, where they were well received, but the first place at the festival was won by Galija. Soon after, Kokan Popović went to serve his mandatory stint in the Yugoslav People's Army and his future wife got pregnant, so the band split up. Vlada Divljan and Zdenko Kolar soon formed Idoli, Dragan Mitrić joined Bulevar and Kokan Popović joined Slađana Milošević's backing band.

=== Propaganda ===
Former Zvuk Ulice members Kokan Popović (guitar, vocals) and Dragan Mitrić (keyboards) with Branko Isaković (bass guitar) and Nenad Morgenstern (drums, percussion) formed Propaganda in 1981. The band started recording their debut album, partially featuring material from the Zvuk Ulice repertoire, in the Radio Belgrade Studio 5. The album featured pop-oriented sound with influences from various genres. Apatija javnosti (Apathy of the Public), released by PGP-RTB in 1982, featured ten tracks, including the opening track, "Esmeralda", featuring lyrics written by Muharem Serbezovski, a famous Macedonian Romani musician.

After the album was released, the band disbanded.

=== Post breakup ===
At the time of Apatija javnosti release, Kokan Popović had already been working with Idoli, on their debut album Odbrana i poslednji dani (The Defence and the Last Days), and in 1983, Branko Isaković also joined Idoli and appeared as bassist on the albums Čokolada (Chocolate) and Šest dana juna (Six Days of June). Dragan Mitrić performed with Bajaga i Instruktori and later became the part of his former Bulevar bandmate Dejan Cukić's backing band called Spori Ritam Band (Slow Rhythm Band).

Propaganda song "Bugatty" appeared on the Polish multi-artist compilation Ruleta 5, released by Supraphon in 1984, and the track "18. Novembar" ("November 18") appeared on the Computer Incarnations For World Peace German various artists compilation, released in 2007 by Sonar Kollektiv.

== Discography ==
=== Studio albums ===
- Apatija javnosti (1982)

== See also ==
- New wave music in Yugoslavia
