= Aleksandar Prokopiev =

Macedonian writer and academic (born 1953)

- Александар Прокопиев
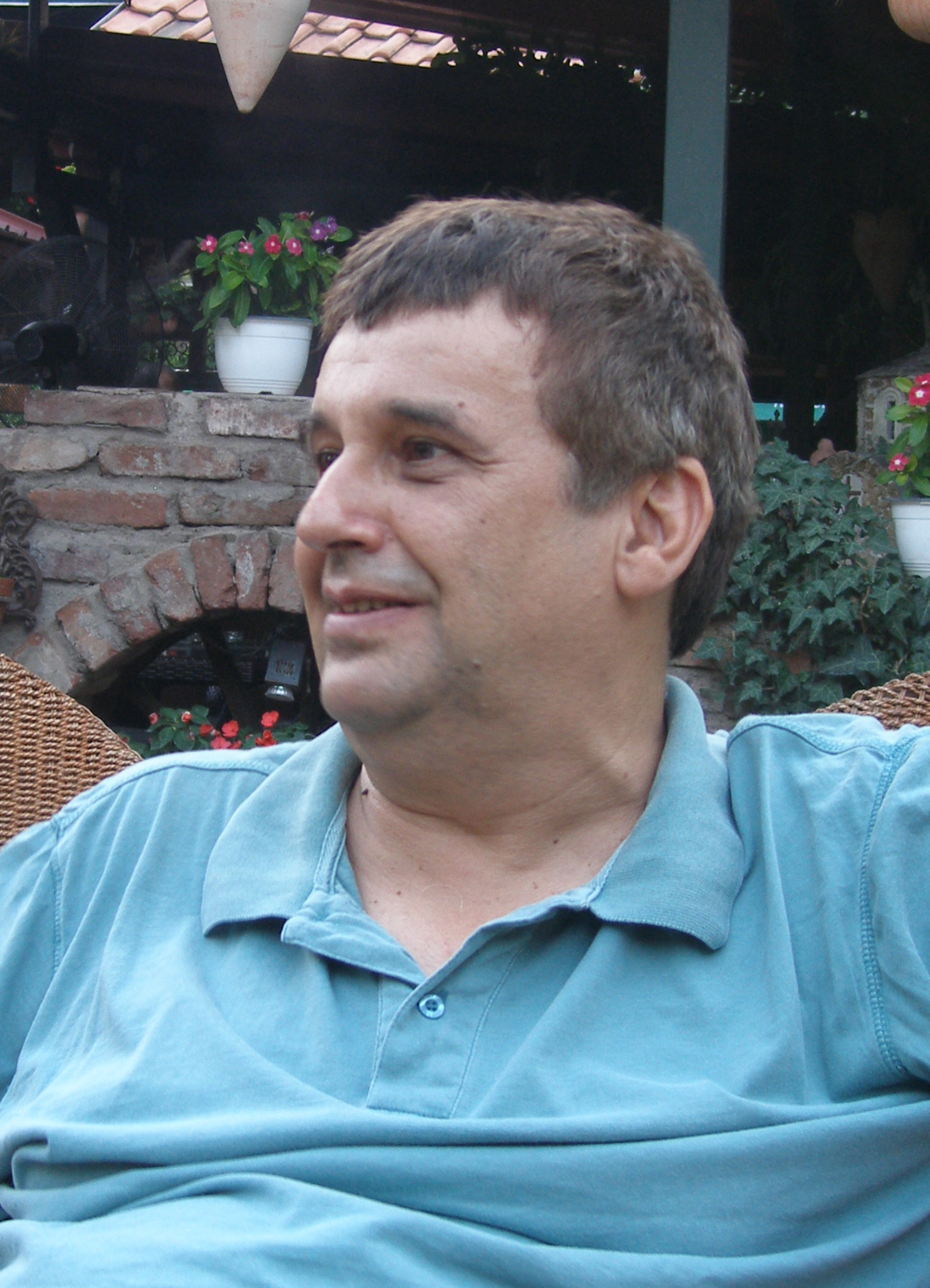
- Born: February 24, 1953 (age 73); Skopje, PR Macedonia, FPR Yugoslavia (present-day North Macedonia)
- Occupation: Author

Aleksandar Prokopiev (Macedonian: Александар Прокопиев; born February 24, 1953) is a Macedonian PhD in comparative literature and literary theory working in the Institute of Macedonian Literature at the Ss. Cyril and Methodius University of Skopje, the Republic of North Macedonia. He is also notable as a writer, essayist and a former member of the eminent Yugoslav rock band Idoli.

== Biography ==
Aleksandar Prokopiev was born in 1953 in Skopje, then the capital of the Socialist Republic of Macedonia, a constituent country of the former Socialist Federal Republic of Yugoslavia. He graduated in 1977 at the University of Belgrade Faculty of Philology, General and Comparative literature department, and finished postgraduate education in 1982 also in Belgrade and in Sorbonne, France.

He worked in several domestic and foreign magazines, for example as a member of the editorial board of Orient Express (Oxford, UK) and World Haiku (Kyoto, Japan). He wrote screenplays for film, theatre, TV shows, radio dramas and comic books. His works were translated in English, French, Italian, Japanese, Russian, Polish, Hungarian, Czech, Slovak and other languages.

Aleksandar Prokopiev was also an active musician. While studying in Belgrade he played with the Yugoslav rock band Idoli, an eminent act of the former Yugoslav new wave scene. It is claimed that he wrote the famous Idoli's song Retko te viđam sa devojkama, however he is not credited on the record itself (Vlada Divljan is credited as the author instead). In Macedonia, Prokopiev was a member of the notable band Usta na Usta which was active during the 1980s. Its recordings were released by the music production branch of the national Macedonian Radio-Television.

== Bibliography ==
Prokopiev is an author of several books including (titles translated in English language):

- The Young Master of the Game (short stories, 1983)
- ...or... (short stories, 1986)
- Sailing South (short stories, 1986)
- A Sermon on the Snake (stories, 1992)
- Was Callimachus a Post-Modernist? (essays, 1994)
- Fairytale on the road (essays, 1996)
- Let's make a movie together (children's literature, 1997)
- Ars amater-ia (stories, 1998)
- Image which rolls (haiku, 1998)
- Anti-instructions for personal use (poetry, 2000)
- Postmodern Babylon (essays, 2000)
- The Man With Four Watches (2003)
- Homunculus (fairy tales for adults, 2015), translated into English by Istros Books in 2012.
