= VIS Idoli (album) =

Box set by Idoli
- Released: 5 July 2007
- Recorded: 1981–1985
- Genre: New wave, punk rock, art rock, pop rock, rock
- Length: 152:58
- Label: Croatia Records

Idoli chronology
Paket aranžman (2007)	VIS Idoli (2007)

VIS Idoli is a collection of four albums by Yugoslav new wave band Idoli. The albums included in the set are:

- 1981 VIS Idoli (with the "Maljčiki" / "Retko te viđam sa devojkama" single as bonus tracks)
- 1982 Odbrana i poslednji dani
- 1983 Čokolada
- 1985 Šest dana juna

They are all released with the same track listing and design as the original albums except for the VIS Idoli EP, which features the band's second single as bonus tracks.
