= Šarlo Akrobata discography =

- Studio albums: 1
- Compilation albums: 1
- Singles: 1
- Music videos: 5

The discography of the Serbian new wave/post-punk band Šarlo Akrobata (Serbian Cyrillic: Шарло Акробата; trans. Charlot the Acrobat, a Serbo-Croatian language version of Charlie Chaplin's name in the Kingdom of Yugoslavia), consists of one studio albums, one single and one featured compilation album.

== Studio albums ==
Year	Album details
1981	Bistriji ili tuplji čovek biva kad...: Released: 1981; Label: Jugoton; Format: LP, CS, CD

== Compilation albums ==
Year	Album details
1981	Paket aranžman: Released: 1981; Label: Jugoton; Format: LP, CS, CD

== Singles ==
Year	Single details
1981	"Mali čovek": B-side: "Ona se budi"; From the album: Paket aranžman; Released: 1981; Label: Jugoton; Format: 7"

== Music videos ==
Song
"Niko kao ja" (first version)
"Niko kao ja" (second version)
"Oko moje glave"
"Ona se budi"
"O, o, o"
