= VIS Idoli (EP) =

EP by VIS Idoli
- Released: 1981
- Recorded: April 1981
- Studio: RTZ Tone Studio (Zagreb, Yugoslavia)
- Genre: New wave
- Length: 26:30
- Label: Jugoton
- Producer: Ivan "Piko" Stančić

Idoli chronology
| Paket aranžman (1981) | VIS Idoli (1981) | Odbrana i poslednji dani (1982) |

VIS Idoli, (Note: "VIS" stands for "vokalno-instrumentalni sastav", meaning "vocal-instrumental [music] ensemble".) also known as Mini LP, was the first and only EP by the Serbian new wave band Idoli. The cover of the EP is the Red Nude, an act by Amedeo Modigliani.

== History ==
The euphoria Idoli have made with their single "Maljčiki" / "Retko te viđam sa devojkama" resulted a great expectation on the next release. The band entered the studio in April 1981. Photographs from the recording sessions were released in newspapers and magazines. The band recorded six songs, including two cover versions. The whole material was released on a 12" self-titled EP.

The band covered Chuck Berry's hit "Come On" (1961) in an Elvis Costello style—but with lyrics in Serbian—retitled "Hajde!", and Vlastimir "Đuza" Stojiljković's "Devojko mala" (1958) from the 1960 film Ljubav i moda. The lyrics for the opening track "Dok dobuje kiša (u ritmu tam-tama)" were taken from Nebojša Krstić's poetry book O, ima načina. "Hajde!" appeared on The Promising Boy movie soundtrack.

The record design and production was done by Ivan "Piko" Stančić and the cover was chosen to be The Red Nude by Amedeo Modigliani. Guest appearances featured Film members Mladen Juričić (also known as Max Wilson) who made a guest appearance playing harmonica and Jurij Novoselić (also known as Kuzma Videosex) who played organ.

VIS Idoli was also released as a double cassette EP with Film's Live in Kulušić EP entitled Zajedno. A remastered version was released on the band's 2007 box set with two bonus tracks.

== Promotional videos and live performances ==
Promotional video was recorded for "Devojko mala" as the TV stations already broadcast the video for "Malena" and "Zašto su danas devojke ljute", which had its TV premiere on the 1981 New Year's Eve as part of Rokenroler show. The video for "Maljčiki" also premiered on the same show. A new video for "Zašto su danas devojke ljute" was recorded after the EP was released.

The EP was presented to the audience on tour with Film. Most of the shows were held at the seaside resorts. By the end of the tour, Kokan Popović became the band's new drummer.

"Dok dobuje kiša (u ritmu tam-tama)" and "Malena" appeared on Vlada Divljan's 1996 live album Odbrana i zaštita.

== Track listing ==
| No. | Title | Writer(s) | Producer | Length |
|---|---|---|---|---|
| 1. | "Dok dobuje kiša (u ritmu tam-tama)" | Vlada Divljan; Nebojša Krstić | Ivan "Piko" Stančić | 3:30 |
| 2. | "Zašto su danas devojke ljute" | Srđan Šaper; Divljan | Stančić | 2:40 |
| 3. | "Devojko mala" | Darko Kraljić; Božidar Timotijević | Stančić | 2:02 |
| 4. | "Ime da da" | Šaper | Stančić | 3:25 |
| 5. | "Malena" | Divljan | Stančić | 6:16 |
| 6. | "Hajde!" | Chuck Berry | Stančić | 1:50 |
| Total length: | | | | 19:43 |

2007 remaster bonus tracks
| No. | Title | Writer(s) | Producer | Length |
|---|---|---|---|---|
| 7. | "Retko te viđam sa devojkama" | Divljan | Goran Bregović | 3:05 |
| 8. | "Maljčiki" | Šaper; Divljan | Bregović | 3:20 |
| Total length: | | | | 26:08 |

Notes

- "Dok dobuje kiša (u ritmu tam-tama)" contains lyrics from the poetry book O, ima načina by Nebojša Krstić.
- "Devojko mala" is a cover of the 1958 song of the same name, penned by Božidar Timotijević and composed by Darko Kraljić, and performed by Vlastimir "Đuza" Stojiljković.
- "Hajde!" is a cover of "Come On" (1961), written and performed by Chuck Berry.
- "Retko te viđam sa devojkama" included here is a 1981 re-recording of Idoli's 1980 stand-alone single.
- "Maljčiki" included here is the original version of the song, whereas the one later included on Paket aranžman (1981) is a re-recorded one.

== Personnel ==
- Vlada Divljan (guitar, vocals)
- Nebojša Krstić (percussion, vocals)
- Srđan Šaper (percussion, vocals)
- Boža Jovanović (drums)
- Zdenko Kolar (bass)

== External links and references ==
- VIS Idoli (EP) at Discogs
- EX YU ROCK enciklopedija 1960-2006, Janjatović Petar; ISBN 978-86-905317-1-4
