= Nebojša Krstić =

Serbian musician, marketing expert and political adviser

- Небојша Крстић

Public relations adviser to the President of Serbia
- In office 11 July 2004 – 5 April 2012
- President: Boris Tadić

Personal details
- Born: 9 July 1957 (age 69) Belgrade, PR Serbia, FPR Yugoslavia
- Party: DS (1992–2014); SNS (2026–present)
- Education: University of Belgrade Faculty of Medicine
- Occupation: Marketing executive; musician; physician

Nebojša Krstić (Serbian: Небојша Крстић; born 9 July 1957) is a Serbian marketing expert, political commentator, former musician and physician. In the early 1980s he was a member of the new wave band Idoli. He later worked in advertising and served as public relations adviser to Boris Tadić, then the President of Serbia, from 2004 to 2012. A long-time member of the Democratic Party (DS), he left it in 2014 and later became a supporter of Aleksandar Vučić and his Serbian Progressive Party (SNS), which he joined in October 2026.

== Early life and medical career ==
Krstić finished the First Belgrade Gymnasium and graduated from the University of Belgrade Faculty of Medicine. After his studies, he worked as a physician for about a decade, including on the island of Vis and at the Hyatt Regency hotel in Belgrade. He then moved into marketing and became director of the Nova Young & Rubicam advertising agency.

== Musical career ==
=== VIS Dečaci ===
In late 1979, Srđan Šaper and Krstić, both university students and non-musicians, decided to take up music and agreed with Vlada Divljan, Šaper's close friend from secondary school, to form a band. Šaper was to play the guitar, while Krstić and Divljan played the drums. The band was called Dečaci (The Boys). Around the same time, the band met photographer Dragan Papić, who became its creative mediator; he photographed the band and published the photos in the youth magazine Vidici, with captions mainly parodying gay themes.

In February 1980, the band started rehearsing in Divljan's building, where Zdenko Kolar, Divljan's friend since primary school, also lived; Krstić played Kolar's bass and used his amplifier. Divljan later invited Kolar, with whom he had played since 1968, to join the band, and it was soon joined by drummer Boža Jovanović, a friend of Divljan and Kolar. Owing to a lack of progress, Krstić and Šaper stopped playing and concentrated on writing. Krstić was the author of the first Belgrade graffito of the period, "Margita je dečak" ("Margita is a boy"), dedicated to his friend Margita Stefanović, later the keyboard player of Ekatarina Velika.

=== Idoli ===
On 1 March 1980, the band was renamed VIS Idoli. The first song it wrote was "Retko te viđam sa devojkama" ("I seldom see you with girls"). A month later, Papić arranged for Vidici to finance the recording of the band's first single at the Druga Maca studio, owned by Enco Lesić, who produced it. The single featured "Pomoć, pomoć" and "Retko te viđam sa devojkama" on the A-side and Slobodan Škerović's narrative poem "Poklon" on the B-side; Krstić provided backing vocals and percussion. The band released another single, "Maljčiki", for the major label Jugoton, produced by Goran Bregović, and performed "Zašto su danas devojke ljute?" ("Why are the girls angry today?") at the Festival Omladina.

With Električni Orgazam and Šarlo Akrobata, Idoli took part in the compilation Paket aranžman with four tracks: "Schwule über Europa", "Plastika" ("Plastic"), "Maljčiki" (Russian for "Boys", a parody of socialist realism) and "Amerika" ("America"). The promotional video for "Maljčiki" was banned on national television and some radio stations after the Soviet embassy complained. With its videos and singles widely broadcast, the band became one of the most popular acts in Yugoslavia. Its debut EP of six tracks sold about 200,000 copies; by then, Kokan Popović had become the band's drummer.

The band produced its debut album, Odbrana i poslednji dani, itself in the autumn and winter of 1981–1982, and it was released in early 1982. One of the first Yugoslav concept albums, inspired by Borislav Pekić's novel of the same title, it sold about 50,000 copies, which was considered a commercial failure. Its only hit was "Kenozoik", on which Krstić sang lead vocals; he also sang lead on "Glavna ptico (skrati svoj dugački jezik)" ("Main bird (shorten your long tongue)").

At Jugoton's insistence, the next album had to be more commercial. With Branko Isaković on bass, the band recorded Čokolada in London with producer Bob Painter; it became one of the best-selling Yugoslav records. Krstić and Šaper were its main writers, as Divljan was finishing his university degree, and Krstić sang lead vocals on the title track and "U gradu bez sna" ("In a dreamless city"). Relations within the band cooled during the Čokolada tour, and the band split up after a concert in Ljubljana. Its last release was the soundtrack for the 1985 film Šest dana juna, written by Divljan and recorded by the rest of the band; Krstić did not take part in the recording, as he starred in the film.

=== Later musical work ===
After Idoli split up, Krstić and Šaper wrote songs for singer Bilja Krstić. In 1987, they released the album Poslednja mladost u Jugoslaviji on Jugoton, recorded with the band Unutrašnja Imperija, consisting of Gagi Mihajlović (guitar), Branko Isaković (bass) and Dragoljub Đuričić (drums).

In 1995, Krstić and Šaper formed the supergroup Dobrovoljno Pevačko Društvo with Piloti frontman Kiki Lesendrić. Krstić provided vocals and drum machine, Šaper sang, and Lesendrić played lead guitar, produced and arranged the songs. The album Nedelja na Duhove was recorded in Budapest in early 1995 and released by Eastfield Music, with guest appearances by Aleksandra Kovač, Kristina Kovač, Milan Đurđević of Neverne Bebe, Istvan-Steve Alapi and Zoltan Metenyi. In 1996, Krstić and Šaper appeared as guests on the self-titled album by Akcija. Krstić has since left the music business.

== Political career ==
Krstić joined the Democratic Party in 1992. During Tadić's 2008 presidential campaign, he was the campaign's creative director, in charge of Tadić's media presentation. From 2004 to 2012, he served as Tadić's public relations adviser. In March 2014, he informed the DS municipal board in Voždovac by email that he no longer wished to be a member and asked to be removed from the party register. He later became a critic of Tadić; in 2018, the two had a public dispute in Nedeljnik.

During the SNS-led government, Krstić became a vocal supporter of Vučić and a frequent guest on pro-government television channels. In August 2024, he announced on X that he would try to take over the Democratic Party and remove its president, Zoran Lutovac, whom he associated with Dragan Đilas; he claimed that he had been expelled from DS contrary to its statute and said that he would sue the party to be reinstated. Lutovac dismissed the announcement, saying that he had "nothing decent" to say about Krstić. In October 2025, during the student-led anti-corruption protests, Krstić publicly challenged Aleksandar Šapić, the mayor of Belgrade, on X; political analyst Dragomir Anđelković described Krstić as an "exponent" of Vučić who did not act on his own.

On 27 October 2026, two days after SNS lost the parliamentary election, Miloš Vučević, the president of SNS, announced that Krstić and actress Lidija Vukićević had joined the party.

== Filmography ==
- Šest dana juna (1985)

== Discography ==
=== With Srđan Šaper ===
==== Studio albums ====
- Poslednja mladost u Jugoslaviji (1987)

==== Singles ====
- "Razvod 1999" / "Parada" (1999)

=== With Dobrovoljno Pevačko Društvo ===
- Nedelja na Duhove (1995)

=== Guest appearances ===
- Akcija – Akcija (1996), on the track "7 dana" ("7 days")
