= Pomoć, pomoć =

Single by VIS Idoli
- Language: Serbian
- English title: Help, Help
- A-side: "Retko te viđam sa devojkama"
- B-side: "Poklon"
- Released: May 1980
- Recorded: 1980
- Genre: New wave
- Length: 1:29
- Label: Vidici
- Songwriter: Vlada Divljan

VIS Idoli singles chronology
"Pomoć, pomoć" / "Retko te viđam sa devojkama" (1980)	"Maljčiki" (1981)

"Pomoć, pomoć" (transl. Help, Help) is the first song which appeared on the first single by Serbian new wave band Idoli. The song, with "Retko te viđam sa devojkama" appeared on the A-side while the B-side contained Slobodan Škerović's narrative poem called "Poklon". The song was performed live by the band for a very short time.

== Cover versions ==
- The soundtrack album for Three Palms for Two Punks and a Babe (1998) written by Vlada Divljan featured a cover version of "Pomoć, pomoć" performed by Divljan and Urgh! vocalist Ghuru Ghagi.

== Track listing ==
A-side
No.	Title	Writer(s)	Performer(s)	Length
1.	"Pomoć, pomoć"	Vlada Divljan	Idoli	1:29
2.	"Retko te viđam sa devojkama"	Divljan	Idoli	3:17
Total length:				4:46

B-side
No.	Title	Lyrics	Performer(s)	Length
1.	"Poklon"	Slobodan Škerović	Škerović	4:42

== Personnel ==
A-side

- Vlada Divljan (guitar, vocals)
- Srđan Šaper (percussion, vocals)
- Nebojša Krstić (percussion)
- Zdenko Kolar (bass guitar)
- Boža Jovanović (drums)

B-side

- Slobodan Škerović (vocals)
- Žarko Kalmić (piano)
