= Stranac u noći (Idoli song) =

Single by Idoli

from the album Čokolada
- B-side: "Bambina"
- Released: 1983
- Recorded: "SLS" studio, 1983
- Genre: Pop; Rock
- Length: 4:31
- Label: Jugoton
- Songwriters: Srđan Šaper; Vlada Divljan; Nebojša Krstić
- Producers: Bob Painter; Idoli

"Stranac u noći" ("Stranger In The Night) is the B-side of the third single by the Serbian band Idoli. The song is a piano-dominated ballad for which Vlada Divljan provided the lead vocals.

== Track listing ==
1. "Bambina" (3:08) (N. Krstić, S. Šaper, V. Divljan, D. Gerzić)
2. "Stranac u noći" (4:31) (N. Krstić, S. Šaper, V. Divljan)

== Personnel ==
- Vlada Divljan (guitar, lead vocals)
- Nebojša Krstić (percussion, vocals)
- Srđan Šaper (synthesizer, vocals)
- Branko Isaković (bass guitar)
- Kokan Popović (drums)
