= Aparatchiks =

Apartchiks
- Origin: Sydney, Australia
- Genres: Electronic; Experimental
- Years active: 1997
- Labels: Avant Garde Records; AG Records
- Spinoff of: Idoli; Leb i Sol
- Past members: Vlada Divljan; Kiril Džajkovski

Aparatchiks were an electronic–experimental duo featuring former Idoli frontman Vlada Divljan and former Leb i Sol keyboardist Kiril Džajkovski, both living in Australia during the late nineties when the band existed. After releasing one EP and one long-play album, the two continued working on their solo projects.

== History ==
Former Idoli frontman Vlada Divljan moved to Australia in August 1991. He worked with local bands and soon started working on a local Serbian radio station. During the mid-nineties he had already established himself as an expert on soundtrack composing, mainly working with electronic music. At about the same time former Leb i Sol member Kiril Džajkovski moved to Australia and released an EP Synthetic Theatre through AG records.

In January 1997, the two started working together on a project called Aparatchicks and the first release was Dekada (Decade) featuring four tracks of sampled speeches of Slobodan Milošević combined with electronic music and rhythm. It was released as an EP by Avant Garde Records. The next release was a long play album Recorded Supplement released by AG Records in 1997. The album featured experimental electronic music sound. The font used for the cover was similar to the font of the Serbian daily newspaper Politika.

In 1998 Divljan returned to Serbia and recorded the soundtrack album for Tri palme za dve bitange i ribicu, released by Favi. The soundtrack featured tracks from the Dekada EP. Divljan went back to Australia. He met his future wife Dina, got a son and moved to Vienna. In the meantime he released two solo albums, one with his Old Stars Band called Sve laži sveta and the other Vlada Divljan presents Die Tonzentrale as Die Tonzentrale.

Džajkovski continued his solo works and recorded several EPs, albums and soundtracks. In 2005 he worked on the soundtrack album for Balcancan on which appeared the track "Baba Zumbula" featuring Vlada Divljan. The song became a nationwide hit in Macedonia.

== Discography ==
- Dekada (Avant Garde Records, 1997) - EP
- Recorded Supplement (AG Records, 1997) - Studio album
- Tri palme za dve bitange i ribicu (Favi, 1998) - Soundtrack album, featuring tracks from Dekada

== External links and references ==
- EX YU ROCK enciklopedija 1960-2006, Janjatović Petar; ISBN 978-86-905317-1-4
- Kiril Džajkovski official site
