= Yugoton =

Compilation album by Various Artists
- Released: 2001
- Genres: Rock, new wave
- Length: 43:04
- Labels: ZIC ZAC Music Company, BMG

Professional ratings
Review scores
Source	Rating
Folkbunker.com	(?)

Yugoton is a tribute album to the former Yugoslav rock scene released in Poland by ZIC ZAC Music Company and BMG Poland in 2001. It features cover versions of eminent ex-Yugoslav artists performed in Polish by the cover band named Yugoton, composed of several notable Polish musicians.

== Background ==
The non-aligned SFR Yugoslavia was not an Eastern Bloc member and was largely opened to western influences, compared to the other communist countries. Yugoslavia had a well-developed rock scene, which became very popular in communist Poland, where the freedom of expression was much more restricted. Many Yugoslav artists toured Poland. Električni Orgazam recorded a live album titled Warszawa '81, Azra released the song "Poljska u mome srcu" (Serbo-Croatian for 'Poland in My Heart') on their 1981 album Sunčana strana ulice as a support to the Polish opposition against Wojciech Jaruzelski, and the prominent promoter Igor Vidmar organized a concert in support of Solidarity.

== Overview ==
Yugoton is a tribute to the former Yugoslav music scene. Even its very title is a nod to the Yugoslav record industry, specifically its largest and most prominent publicly owned record label Jugoton. It features cover versions of eminent artists from SFR Yugoslavia such as Električni Orgazam, Idoli, Prljavo Kazalište, Haustor, Parni Valjak and Bajaga i Instruktori. Most of these artists were formerly involved in the Yugoslav new wave scene. The cover versions are performed in Polish by the cover band Yugoton featuring Kasia Nosowska, Paweł Kukiz, Olaf Deriglasoff, Tymon Tymański, Kazik and others. The CD also has CD-ROM multimedia features for PC use.

The ties between the former Yugoslav and the Polish scenes still exist. Vlada Divljan from Belgrade's Idoli and Darko Rundek from the Zagreb-based Haustor were invited as guests to the Yugoton project. They are featured in the photo on the CD cover of Yugoton together with Polish artists.

Later the project name was changed to Yugopolis. Under this name the band released two more albums and third is being produced. They also played live (including acoustic sets with some artists whose songs were covered on Yugoton/Yugopolis albums). Only Paweł Kukiz sang lead vocals on all three albums.

== Track listing ==
1. "Malcziki", originally by VIS Idoli (feat. Kazik)
2. "Rzadko Widuję Cię Z Dziewczętami", originally by VIS Idoli (feat. Kasia Nosowska & Paweł Kukiz)
3. "Dziewczęta W Letnich Sukienkach/Moja Prva Ljubav", originally by Haustor (feat. Ryszard "Tymon" Tymański)
4. "Czarno-Biały Świat/Crno Bijeli Svijet", originally by Prljavo kazalište (feat. Kazik)
5. "Gdy Miasto Śpi (Snem Kamiennym)/Obična Ljubavna Pjesma", originally by Aerodrom (feat. Kasia Nosowska)
6. "Falochron/442 Do Beograda", originally by Bajaga (feat. Olaf Deriglasoff)
7. "Elektryczny Orgazm/Kako Bubanj Kaže", originally by Električni Orgazam (feat. Kazik)
8. "To Była Sobota/Zamisli život u ritmu muzike za ples", originally by Film (feat. Kasia Nosowska)
9. "Ema/Ena", originally by Haustor (feat. Paweł Kukiz)
10. "W Sercu Miasta/Odvedi me iz ovog grada", originally by Film (feat. Grzegorz Nawrocki)
11. "O Nic Nie Pytaj (Bo Nie Pytam Ja)/Uhvati Ritam", originally by Parni valjak (feat. Paweł Kukiz)
12. "1000 Kawałków/Neprilagođen", originally by Film (feat. Olaf Deriglasoff)

== See also ==
- New wave music in Yugoslavia
- SFR Yugoslav pop and rock scene
- Jugoton
