= Stranac u noći =

Stranac u noći (lit. "Stranger in the night") may refer to:

- Stranac u noći (Idoli song), 1983 song by the Serbian rock band Idoli
- Stranac u noći (album), 1987 album by the Croatian singer Massimo Savić

== See also ==
- Stranci u noći (plural form), 1966 song by Ivo Robić
