= Zona B =

Serbian blues rock band

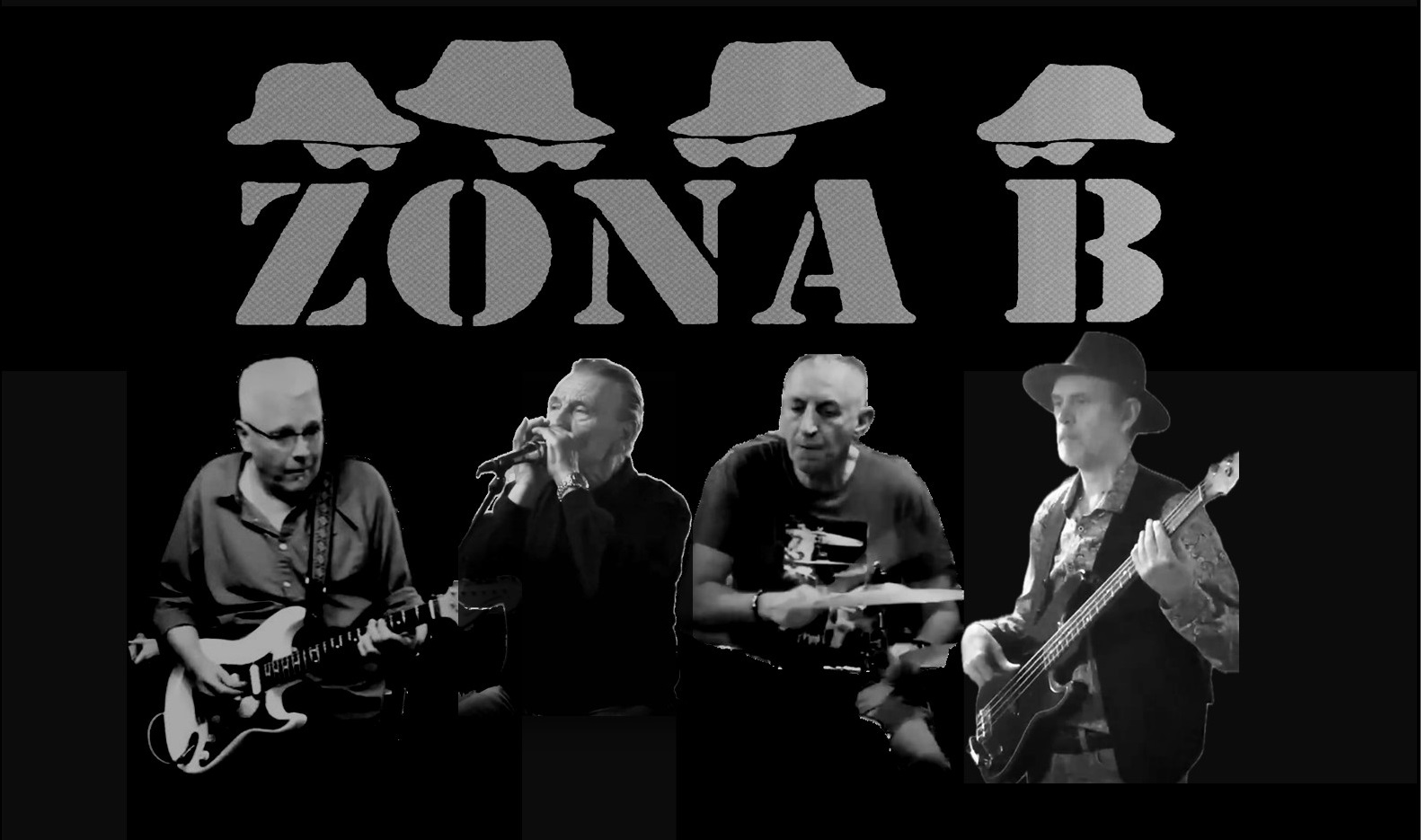

Background information
- Origin: Belgrade, Serbia
- Genres: Blues rock
- Years active: 1986–present
- Labels: PGP-RTB, Round Records, One Records, PGP-RTS, CKU Aleksinac, Vertical Jazz, Croatia Records

Zona B (Serbian Cyrillic: Зона Б, transl. Zone B) is a Serbian and Yugoslav blues rock band formed in Belgrade in 1986. They are one of the most prominent blues rock acts of the Serbian and Yugoslav rock scenes.

== History ==
Zona B was officially formed on 29 November 1986 by vocalist Jovan "Lole" Savić, guitarist Tomislav Rakijaš, drummer Dušan Ristić and keyboardist Vladimir Filipović. The band had their first performance in February 1988 in Mašinac club in Belgrade. After several lineup changes, the band's lineup was complete with the arrival of bass guitarist Zdenko Kolar, a former member of the new wave band Idoli, and Dušan "Duda" Bezuha, a former member of the rock bands Tilt and Suncokret.

In 1991. the band released their debut album, entitled Bestseller, through PGP-RTB. The album was produced by Bezuha (which would be the case will all of the band's future studio releases) and featured cover versions of blues and rock classics, like Ten Years After's "Love Like a Man", Fleetwood Mac's "Oh Well", J.J. Cale's "Cocaine", The Nashville Teens' "Tobacco Road", Howlin' Wolf's "Spoonful", and others. Guest appearances on the album featured Bebi Dol on vocals and Petar "Pera Joe" Miladinović (of Blues Trio) on harmonica.

During Zona B's work on their following studio album, Filipović left the band. The band's second studio album, entitled Juke-Box, was recorded with guest keyboardist Saša Lokner (of Bajaga i Instruktori), who played Hammond organ on the recording, and released in 1993 through PGP-RTS. Beside cover versions, it featured two Zona B songs, "My Woman" and "Don't Put Me Down", both authored by Bezuha and Savić. As other guests on the album appeared Zoran Božinović (guitar, vocals), his son Ivan Božinović (backing vocals), Petar Miladinović (harmonica) and Miroslav "Cvele" Cvetković (of Bajaga i Instruktori, bass guitar, vocals). After the album release, Savić and Rakijaš left the band, Savić forming the band Balkanski Trougao (Balkan Triangle). They were replaced by vocalist Petar Zarija and guitarist and vocalist Zoran Božinović (a former Pop Mašina and Rok Mašina member). The band was also joined by harmonica player Ljuba Đorđević, as the band members opted to introduce harmonica into their sound instead of finding a new keyboardist as a replacement for Filipović,.

In 1999, the band self-released their first two albums, originally released on vinyl only, on one CD, on the Two on One compilation. As bonus track on the album appeared their version of the Traffic song "When the Eagle Flies", originally recorded with Bebi Dol on vocals for the PGP-RTB's 1994 various artists album Belgrade / The Blues / Today / Vol. 1. Later during the year, the band released the album Pirat (Pirate). The album featured new covers of blues classics, while the song "Gues Who" was composed by Bezuha on B.B. King's lyrics. Guest appearances featured Vlada Divljan (Kolar's former bandmate from Idoli, guitar), Ognjan "Ogi" Radivojević (Hammond organ), Ivana Ćosić (vocals), Boža Škipić (guitar) and Petar Radmilović (drums). After the album release, Đordević left the band, continuing his career in the group Blue Family, and guitarist Dragan "Dadi" Stojanović (formerly of Radio Blues Band and XL Band) joined in. In 2000, the band appeared on the One Records various artists live album Blues Summit Coupe Vol. 1 with a live version of the song "Negde daleko", written by Božinović and originally recorded by his former band Pop Mašina, and on Blues Summit Coupe Vol. 2 with a live version of "Trouble in Mind".

Zoran Božinović died on 12 July 2004, Zona B continuing their activity as a five-piece. In 2005, the band released the album Original, their first release to feature only their own songs, with part of guitar sessions recorded by Božinović during the album's early recording sessions. On 5 October 2005, in Belgrade's Bard Club, a concert dedicated to Zoran Božinović was held. Beside Zona B, the musicians performing on the concert included his brother Vidoja Božinović (of Riblja Čorba), Miroslav Cvetković, Nebojša Antonijević "Anton" (of Partibrejkers), Dejan Cukić, Petar Radmilović (of Đorđe Balašević's backing band), Dušan Kojić (of Disciplina Kičme), Branislav Petrović (of Električni Orgazam), Dušan Đukić (formerly of Pop Mašina), Nikola Čuturilo, Manja Đorđević (of Disciplina Kičme), Vladimir Đorđević (of Lira Vega and Sila), Vlada Negovanović and the band Van Gogh. During the same year, Stojanović and Zarija, under pseudonyms Mista Daddy and Peter Singer, released the album Vol. 1 as their side project under the moniker Electric Blu. On the album the two combined blues with electronic music.

In 2007, the band released the album Devil Blues. All the songs on the album were authored by Bezuha and Stojanović, with the exception of "Snatch It Back and Hold It", written by Junior West. The song "Rakija" from the album was the band's first song to feature Serbian language lyrics. In 2007, Aleksinac Centre for Culture and Arts released the recording of the band's concert held in Aleksinac on 11 August 2007 on the live album Zdravo-živo (Howdy). The band's original guitarist Tomislav Rakijaš died on 6 October 2008.

In 2011, the band released the album Joker. The songs on the album were composed by Bezuha, and the album lyrics were written by Bezuha, Miomir Mušicki, Stevan Lazić and Srđan Ćuković. The title track was dedicated to Serbian tennis player Novak Djokovic. The album featured guest appearances by the band's former vocalist Jovan Savić, Tanja Jovićević (vocals), Vasil Hadžimanov (keyboards), Ognjan Radivojević (vocals), and others. During the same year, the band celebrated 25 years of existence with a concert they held in Gun club in Belgrade together with the blues rock band Point Blank, and appeared on Blues Time's various artists compilation Bg Blues arhiv (Belgrade Blues Archive) with a version of "Hoochie Coochie Man" recorded live in 1989. In 2013, Bezuha, Kolar and Ristić formed the band Eldorado with film director and former Heroji member Milutin Petrović, the group recording Petrović's songs on the album Eldorado.

In 2014, the band released the DVD Crna maca (Black Kitty), with their performance held in 1997 in Crna maca club in Belgrade, originally recorded for the Radio Television of Serbia. The concert featured guest appearances by Tanja Jovićević, Petar Miladinović, Petar Radmilović and other musicians. The DVD was promoted with a concert held on 5 December 2014 in Belgrade Youth Center, featuring Jovićević, Jovan Savić, Dragoljub Crnčević "Crnke" (of Point Blank), Petar Miladinović and Rade Radivojević as guests. The recording of the concert held in Belgrade Youth Center was released in 2016 on the live album Live. In 2016, Zona B's long-time collaborator Petar "Pera Joe" Miladinović became the official member of the band, and in 2018, they were joined by Rade Radivojević (Hammond organ). The band's former member Ljuba Đorđević died on 7 April 2019.

In 2020, the band released their latest studio album, entitled Songmaker. The songs on the album were composed by Bezuha, and the English language lyrics were written by Miomir Mušicki, Aleksandra Janošević and Sergej Papain. The song "Stani bre" ("Hold On, Bre") featured Serbian language lyrics written by singer-songwriter Nikola Čuturilo, and the album also featured an English language version of the song, entitled "Sunny Day". The song "A Songmaker" featured the gospel choir of the Students of Technical Sciences Club. In 2021, the band released the compilation album Greatest Hits Collection with their old songs, adding to them new sections recorded by different guests.

In 2023 band comes with significant personal changes, leaving by Dušan Duda Bezuha, Pera Joe and Petar Zarija and introducing new guitar player Aleksandar Stanulović Stanley (The Gamblers Sremska Mitrovica) .Major changes in style and making brand new authorised music by J.Savić/A.Stanulović.

In 2025 Zdenko Kolar was leaving a band and new bass player is Dejan Pavlović Deki from october 2025.

== Discography ==
=== Studio albums ===
- Bestseller (1991)
- Juke-Box (1993)
- Pirat (1999)
- Original (2005)
- Devil Blues (2007)
- Joker (2011)
- Songmaker (2020)

=== Live albums ===
- Zdravo-živo (2007)
- Live (2016)

=== Compilation albums ===
- Two on One (2000)
- Zona B Greatest Hits Collection (2021)

=== Video albums ===
- Crna maca (2014)

=== Other appearances ===
- ""When the Eagle Flies" (Belgrade / The Blues / Today / Vol. 1, 1994)
- "Negde daleko" (Blues Summit Coupe Vol. 1, 2000)
- "Trouble in Mind" (Blues Summit Coupe Vol. 2, 2000)
- "Hoochie Coochie Man" (Bg Blues Arhiv, 2011)
