= Živo i akustično =

Live album by Električni Orgazam
- Released: 1996
- Recorded: April 17, 1996; Studio M, Novi Sad
- Genre: Acoustic rock
- Length: 72:24
- Label: B92
- Producer: Srdjan Gojkoviċ Gile; Ivica Vlatković

Električni Orgazam live chronology
Warszawa '81 (1996)	Živo i akustično (1996)	ElOrgNewWave (2007)

Živo i akustično is the Električni Orgazam unplugged album, released in 1996.

== Track listing ==
Source: Discogs

All tracks are written by Srđan Gojković Gile, except where noted

No.	Title	Length
1.	"Najava Zdenko Kolar"
2.	"Fras u šupi"	4:40
3.	"Sve što radim radim za nju"	2:40
4.	"Vreme je za akciju"	2:30
5.	"Ona uvek želi sve"	4:20
6.	"Poljubi me i priznaj mi"	3:57
7.	"Magična ruka" (Kornelije Kovač, Predrag Simić)	5:40
8.	"Kažu mi da te vratim mami"	2:54
9.	"Sve ste vi naše devojke"	3:41
10.	"Skamenjen"	5:18
11.	"The Man Who Sold the World" (David Bowie)	3:08
12.	"Metadosnka terapija"	2:12
13.	"Sunce zna da mesec zna"	2:53
14.	"Pobuna"	3:23
15.	"Ti"	4:40
16.	"Svaka nova noć"	3:41
17.	"Više nisam tvoj"	2:53
18.	"Kapetan Esid"	4:28
19.	"Hajde bejbe (daj da vidim sad)"	3:04
20.	"Seks droga nasilje i strah"	4:40

== Personnel ==
- Srđan Gojković Gile (guitar, vocals)
- Branislav Petrović Banana (guitar, vocals)
- Zoran Radomirović Švaba (bass vocals)
- Miloš Velimir Buca (drums)

=== Additional personnel ===
- Zdenko Kolar (band introduction on track 1)
- Margita Stefanović (piano, organ)
- Boris Bunjac (percussion)
- Melina Appiah (backing vocals)
- Ninela (backing vocals)
- Deže Molnar (saxophone on track 11)
