= Bambina (Idoli song) =

Single by Idoli

from the album Čokolada
- B-side: "Stranac u noći"
- Released: 1983
- Recorded: "SLS" studio, 1983
- Genre: Pop; Rock
- Length: 3:08
- Label: Jugoton
- Songwriters: Srđan Šaper; Vlada Divljan; Nebojša Krstić; Dušan Gerzić
- Producers: Bob Painter; Idoli

"Bambina" is the third single by the Serbian band Idoli. It was chosen to be the only single from the Čokolada album which was the band's highest commercial peak.

== History ==
Having finished the tour for Odbrana i poslednji dani the band started writing new material for a new release which was planned to be a double EP. The record company, Jugoton, did not agree and decided to release Čokolada as a long play record.

"Bambina" was chosen as the promo single first given only to radio stations and later, due to large popularity, appeared for sale as well. As the writer of the song also appeared Dušan Gerzić partially because he was the writer of the track "Čokolada" which was intended for the band Via Talas, but Šaper presented it as an Idoli song. The B-side was chosen to be "Stranac u noći" ("Stranger In The Night").

== Track listing ==
1. "Bambina" (3:08) (N. Krstić, S. Šaper, V. Divljan, D. Gerzić)
2. "Stranac u noći" (4:31) (N. Krstić, S. Šaper, V. Divljan)

== Personnel ==
- Vlada Divljan (guitar, vocals)
- Nebojša Krstić (percussion, vocals)
- Srđan Šaper (synthesizer, vocals)
- Branko Isaković (bass guitar)
- Kokan Popović (drums)
