= Rusija =

Rusija may refer to:

- The South Slavic and Baltic name for Russia
- A song from Yugoslav album Odbrana i poslednji dani
