= Ona se budi =

Single by Šarlo Akrobata

from the album Paket aranžman
- A-side: "Mali čovek"
- Released: 1981
- Recorded: 1980
- Studio: Druga Maca Studio (Belgrade, Yugoslavia)
- Genre: New wave, post-punk
- Length: 3:57
- Label: Jugoton
- Songwriter: Šarlo Akrobata
- Producer: Enco Lesić

"Ona se budi" (transl. She Is Waking Up) is the B-side of the only single "Mali čovek" by Yugoslav new wave band Šarlo Akrobata released in 1981. It is also the opening track on the Paket aranžman compilation which is one of the most influential releases by Yugoslav rock bands.

In 2006, the song was ranked fifth on the B92 Top 100 Domestic Songs list.

== Track listing ==
Both tracks written by Šarlo Akrobata

1. "Mali čovek"
2. "Ona se budi"

== Personnel ==
- Milan Mladenović
- Dušan Kojić Koja
- Ivica Vdović Vd

== Cover versions ==
- Croatian band Le Cinema, which is a faction of the band Film, recorded a cover version on their first studio album Doručak kod Trulog.
- Darko Rundek recorded a version of the song for the Milan Mladenović tribute album Kao da je bilo nekad... Posvećeno Milanu Mladenoviću.
- Serbian guitarist Miroslav Tadić recorded an instrumental version on his 2013 album Mirina.
