= Boža Jovanović =

- Genres: New wave, punk rock
- Instrument: drums
- Years active: 1979 – 1982

Boža Jovanović was the first drummer of the Serbian rock band Idoli. He was the band member until 1982 and released two singles and one EP with the band.

== Biography ==
Jovanović has lived in Belgrade in the same apartment building where Vlada Divljan and Zdenko Kolar lived. The three made a deal to start playing. Divljan got a guitar, Kolar bought a bass and Boža Jovanović used a tin barrel as a drum with metal sticks made by Kolar's father. The band was called Faraoni (Pharaohs) since Divljan had a necklace from Egypt, given by his grandmother, with a Tutankhamun medallion. Since there was a popular band from Kopar named Faraoni, the band was renamed to Holipe. The band lasted for a short time.

When Dečaci decided to start playing Divljan called Kolar and Jovanović to join the band. At the time the band was working with Dragan Papić, photographer and journalist, who became the band's creative mediator and who published Dečaci photos in a well known youth magazine "Vidici". Since Kolar and Jovanović wore beards the band was called Dečaci plus Bradonje (The Boys plus The Bearded) and was shortly after renamed to Idoli.

The band had a rehearsal on March 1, 1980, which was chosen to be the foundation date of the band. On the first rehearsals Idoli wrote their notable hits, first "Retko te viđam sa devojkama" and "Pomoć, pomoć" and then "Maljčiki", "Malena", "Plastika" and other notable new wave anthems. A month later Papić made a deal with "Vidici" to finance the recording of the first single so the band members recorded "Retko te viđam sa devojkama" and "Pomoć, pomoć" as their first single given as present with the April release of the magazine "Vidici". In the meantime Papić made Kolar and Jovanović to shave, but since the two were not as photogenic as the other three members, Papić stopped working with the band.

The band started performing live, but due to a small repertoire, the appearances lasted for about ten to twenty minutes. In an interview Kolar stated that Jovanović was a man with the best rhythm feeling he had ever played with, but on live appearances he was always tense but managed to do the work.

Since Idoli became well known and Jugoton was asking for new bands of the popular new wave music, Idoli were offered to record a single with produce Goran Bregović. "Maljčiki" and a new version of "Retko te viđam sa devojkama" became hits on radio stations. The band members also participated the Paket aranžman project which made them become one of the most popular acts in Yugoslavia.

Jovanović did not appear on the "Maljčiki" video but appeared on other videos of that period. When the band set for the studio to record the first album, the eyes of the public were set right at them. Photographs from the recording sessions came out in the newspapers and the release was expected to come out. The band managed to record six new tracks which were released on a 12" EP called VIS Idoli. It featured two covers and four Idoli tracks. The EP was sold in 200.000 copies.

After the release of the EP Jovanović left Idoli and his later career and life are unknown.

== External links and references ==
- EX YU ROCK enciklopedija 1960-2006, Janjatović Petar; ISBN 978-86-905317-1-4
- Boža Jovanović at Discogs
- Vlada Divljan interview (Serbian source)
