= Slobodan Škerović =

Serbian author, painter and philosopher

- Born: 27 September 1954 (age 71); Belgrade, Serbia, Yugoslavia
- Occupations: Writer, painter, philosopher

Slobodan Škerović (born 27 September 1954 in Belgrade) is a Serbian author, painter and philosopher, and a member of the international neo-avantgarde Signalism movement.

== Biography ==
Škerović studied painting at the Faculty of Applied Arts in Belgrade and Kunstakademie in Düsseldorf. He has had poems and articles published since 1976 in numerous Yugoslav journals: Haiku, Student, Vidici, Knjizevna reč, Koraci, Stvaranje, Signal, Rukovet, Savremenik, Književne novine... He was editor of the Student and Vidici journals from 1980 to 1982, and for a short time was a comics writer and a member of Belgrade's comics art group "Tuš grupa".

As an author and editor he has actively participated in the Signalist neo-avantgarde movement since 2001, and the "Project Rastko" Cultural Network since 2007. He has been a member of the Association of Fine Artists of Serbia since 1996, the Writers Association of Serbia since 2008, and the Association of Serbian Comics Artists since 2010.

Škerović's literary works are characterized by longer poetic forms, with intensive synthesis of traditional spirituality and advanced technology, in poems, essays and science fictionnovels.

== Solo exhibitions ==
- 1988. – Belgrade, "Braća Stamenković" Gallery – paintings
- 1992. – Belgrade, "Sunce" Gallery – paintings
- 1994. – Belgrade, "Paleta" Gallery (Cultural center of Belgrade) – paintings
- 1996. – Beograd, "House of Đura Jakšić", Skadarlija – paintings
- 1996. – Belgrade, "Braća Stamenković" Gallery – miniatures

== Books ==
- "Gift" /Poklon/ (Poem) on a single record, Vidici, no. 3, 1980, side B (side A: VIS Idoli songs "Pomoć, pomoć, pomoć" and "Retko te viđam sa devojkama").
- Glossary of Technology /Rečnik tehnologije/, Vidici, special issue, one of the authors, no. 1-2, 1981.
- Hearts /Srca/ (collection of poems ), Supernova, Belgrade, 1987.
- Indigo (collection of poems), Signal Library, Belgrade, 2005, ISBN 86-900949-2-X
- All the colors of Arcturus /Sve boje Arkturusa/ (experimental prose), library "Svetske sveske", Beogradska manufaktura snova, Belgrade, 2006. ISBN 86-86143-30-X
- Chimera or Borg /Himera ili Borg/ (essays), library "Gold Edition", Tardis, Belgrade, 2008. ISBN 978-86-910579-3-0.
- Black Box /Crna kutija/ (collection of poems), Tardis, Belgrade, 2010. ISBN 978-86-6099-021-3.
- Hugging children /Zagrljena deca/ (collection of poems), Tardis, Belgrade, 2010. ISBN 978-86-6099-023-7.
- Comics we loved: Selection of comics and creators from the former Yugoslavia in the twentieth century (the critical lexicon), the authors and editors Živojin Tamburić, Zdravko Zupan and Zoran Stefanovic, Omnibus, Belgrade, 2011. Lexicon contains Škerović reviews on Yugoslav comics. ISBN 978-86-87071-03-2.
- Shamaniad /Šamanijada/ (novel), edition "Znak Sagite" Book 59, Everest Media, Belgrade, 2012. ISBN 978-86-7756-017-1.
- The dark side of the Force /Tamna strana sile/ (novel), edition "Znak Sagite" Book 69, Everest Media, Belgrade, 2013. ISBN 978-86-7756-029-4.
- Jericho, Jericho, and the poems Chrome and Death of plumule /Jerihon, Jerihon i poeme Kroma i Smrt paperja/ (collection of poems), library "Signal", Everest Media, Belgrade, 2013. ISBN 978-86-7756-032-4.
- Earthphobia /Zemljofobija/ (poetic novel), library "Signal", Everest Media, Belgrade, 2013. ISBN 978-86-7756-035-5.
- Invisible Mars /Nevidljivi Mars/ (poetic novel), library "Signal", Everest Media, Belgrade, 2013. ISBN 978-86-7756-033-1.
- The Vulcan philosophy /Vulkanska filozofija/ (essays), library "Signal", Everest Media, Belgrade, 2013. ISBN 978-86-7756-034-8.
- Thrushes in Hell /Drozdovi u Paklu/ (collection of poems), library "Signal", Everest Media, Belgrade, 2013. ISBN 978-86-7756-036-2.

== Awards ==
- Award of The Association of SF fans "Lazar Komarčić" for the best Serbian story published in 2006. ("Blair Alpha")
