= Odbrana i poslednji dani =

- Album cover

Studio album by Idoli
- Released: 1982
- Recorded: Studios XIII and VI, Radio Belgrade; Autumn and Winter 1981/1982
- Genre: New wave, post-punk, art rock, experimental
- Length: 44:21
- Label: Jugoton
- Producer: Idoli

Idoli chronology
VIS Idoli (1981)	Odbrana i poslednji dani (1982)	Čokolada (1983)

Odbrana i poslednji dani (Serbian Cyrillic: Одбрана и последњи дани 'The Defense and the Last Days') is the first studio album by Yugoslav new wave band Idoli released in 1982.

Džuboks magazine critics voted the album the greatest Yugoslav rock album of the 20th century in 1985. The album was polled in 1998 as Yugoslav greatest popular music album in the book YU 100: najbolji albumi jugoslovenske rok i pop muzike (YU 100: The Best albums of Yugoslav pop and rock music). In 2015, Odbrana i poslednji dani was polled the greatest Yugoslav rock album in the special edition of Croatian Rolling Stone.

== Overview ==
The band started recording their first album during autumn 1981. The record was originally supposed to be produced by the band members themselves with the assistance of Dušan "Spira" Mihajlović; however, Mihajlović soon left the recording sessions, so the album was produced with the help from Mile "Pile" Miletić and Goran Vejvoda. The band's initial plan was an album dealing with religion and tradition, which was seen as potentially provocative due to multiple aspects of these topics still being a taboo in communist Yugoslavia's public sphere at the time. This was the first release that included a lineup change as Kokan Popović (who played with Vlada Divljan and Zdenko Kolar in Zvuk Ulice) now joined Idoli as their new drummer.

The record was named after Borislav Pekić's 1977 novella Odbrana i poslednji dani.

Entering the studio, the band members still weren't entirely clear on what they wanted to do, either stylistically or musically. They had ideas (within the specific context of Pekić's work, and also in broader philosophical scope), but turning them into music and finding satisfactory sound presented a challenge. Due to this experimental trial-and-error approach, the recording process ended up taking almost six months.

Since Idoli were already well-known and popular all across the country, the recording process was documented in Yugoslav media whose print outlets wondered about the group's creative potential and ability to cope with such ambitious project in light of the fact that it was taking them so long to record the album.

In addition to the guitar, Divljan also played the piano, while Šaper played keyboards and synthesizers. Guest appearances featured Goran Vejvoda (Casio synthesizer on "Kenozoik" and "Odbrana" in addition to guitar on "Gde si sad cica-maco"), Mile "Pile" Miletić (guitar solo on "Gde si sad cica-maco"), and Bebi Dol (backing vocals on "Odbrana"). The track "Senke su drugačije" featured Vuk Vujačić (saxophone), Goran Grbić (trumpet) and Slobodan Grozdanović (trombone).

Since the recording process lasted far too long for Jugoton's liking, the label wanted to release the album as soon as possible. The record came out very quickly in early 1982. Unlike the band's previous releases, which were well accepted both commercially and critically, the new album had the critics divided with reactions ranging from extremely positive to extremely negative. Since the band wanted to present the record as non-commercial, no promotional videos were recorded for the album. Fifty thousand copies of the album were sold in Yugoslavia, which was in sharp contrast to the band's previous release, the VIS Idoli EP, that sold roughly 200,000 copies. This resulted in the stylistic change on the next studio effort.

== Album cover and design ==
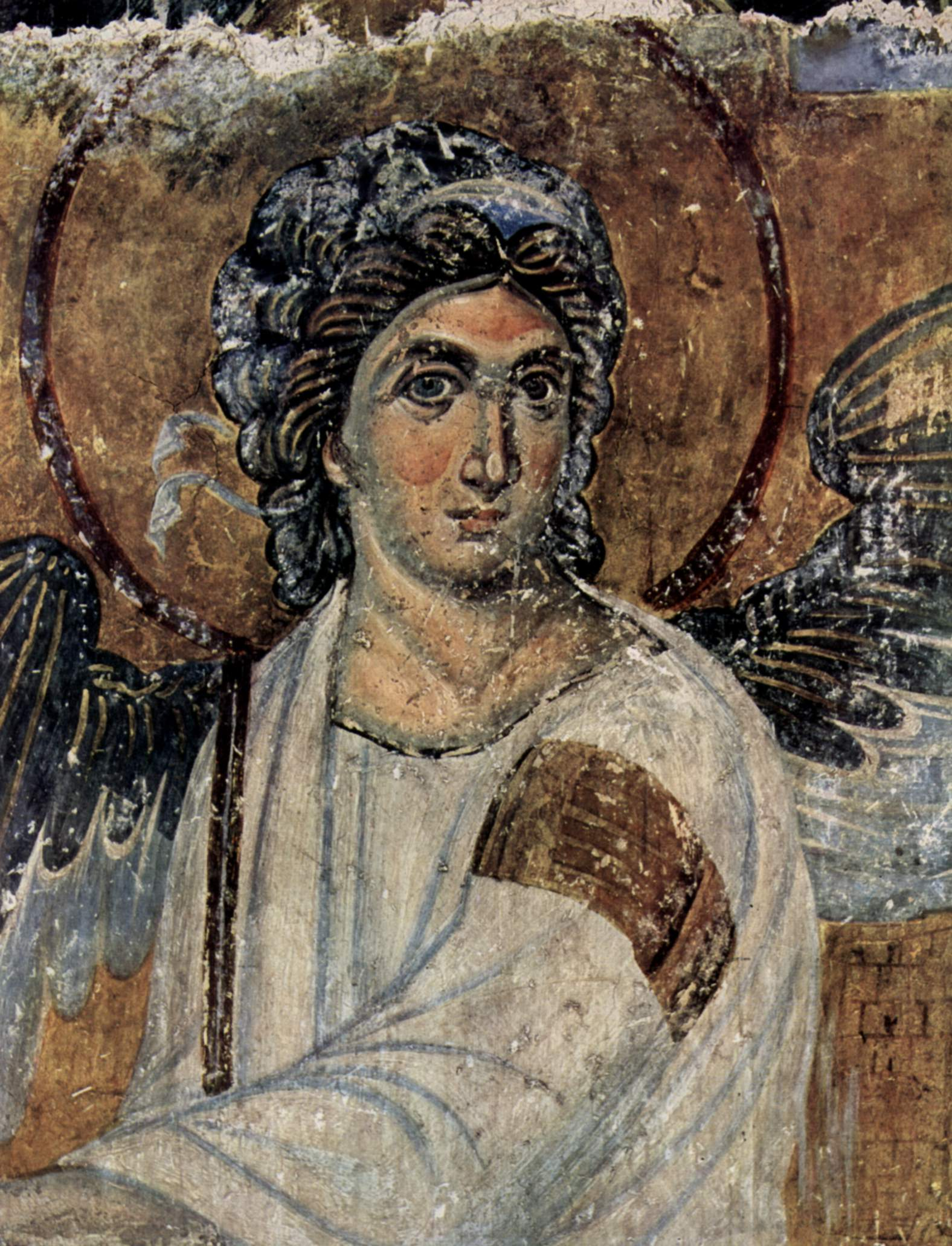
The White Angel.

It is often said that the original album cover was supposed to be a reproduction of the Mileševa monastery fresco "White Angel". Džuboks magazine even published an article about the upcoming Idoli album with the reproduction as the album cover, but Vlada Divljan has recently squashed such rumours stating that this was never supposed to be the cover, adding that he never liked that idea, even as a rumour. He also explained that it would've been a bit much had they ever thought of choosing it for the cover since the album itself contains lyrics that can be considered rather blasphemous.

It was further rumoured that Jugoton did not agree with the cover, considering it provocative in communist Yugoslavia where religion was very much suppressed. As the alternate solution, photographer and designer Goranka Matić, who did the cover, went to the National Museum in Belgrade and took the photo which was used as the album cover. It was chosen to be a cloth detail from a Saint Nicholas icon. Some people also found the shape of the pattern to be similar to the Swastika and thought it was used as a topic on the album, but Divljan stated that any resemblance of the Swastika was unintentional and that people were reading too much into it.

The back cover was a detail from a golden background of the icon. The inner sleeve featured a classical civil photo of the band on the left side and a similar photo of the guests and people involved with the recording on the right side.

The font used on the record was a Cyrillic font similar to the one used in the Miroslav's Gospel. The re-release of the album did not feature Cyrillic letters except for the front cover. Also the names were misspelled and thus the album was called Obrana i posljednji dani, Joca Višković became Joca Đisković, Dragutin Vulinović was changed to Dragutin Đulinović.

== Album concept ==
The story of the album was inspired by a Borislav Pekić book Odbrana i poslednji dani. The novel is a comical view on a man who was a lifeguard on the Tisa river during the last years of the World War II. The man, not very educated, got arrested because he found his first drowned victim, a German soldier. The story of the novel continues with presenting and making fun of his internal conflicts due to his lack of knowledge and a macho attitude. Idoli used the mental state of this man who was disoriented and confused with his surroundings and moved it to the urban background and the present moment (used in the song "Kenozoik"). At any point the story of the novel is connected to the album story as the band focused only on the psychological approach of the novel.

The song "Poslednji dani" (originally entitled "Maršal") represents a man who feels very joyous and romantic at night, a time when his hidden personality shows up. Unlike the man in the novel, who loves the river and enjoys spending time at the empty river bank as the river is his "God", the man in the song loves his Marshal (Tito) who is his "God". The record company did not agree with the last verse of the song as it was directly referring to Josip Broz Tito so the band had to change the song title and remove the last verse.

"Moja si" is one of the strangest Idoli songs. The main character personality becomes divided, and his male personality becomes substituted with a female. In the mirror he sees a woman he would like to be, filled with strange comparisons and statements that shows a deep psychological disorder, which in a different form happened to the main character of the novel.

"Senke su drugačije" present a man determined to leave home. He feels a complete alienation in his surroundings, but is also afraid to leave as the paths are "narrow and dangerous". The structure of the song is keyboard and brass oriented with a march rhythm. In the novel the main character was forced to go to Germany. The story continues with "Nemo" in which the man is completely occupied with the thoughts of the place he is in and continues wandering in the world he can not adopt to.

The next two tracks deal with a complete opposition to the main character in the novel. The first "Rusija" is a romantic ballad about a college student who lives in an apartment with his girlfriend which is a very strong working-class girl. The main character in the novel did not study and did not like dancing which is the topic of "Igrale se delije", a rockabilly song which calls everyone to dance. The backing vocals lyrics include "Igrale se delije nasred zemlje Srbije" which was a popular poem written by Serbian poet Milorad M. Petrović Seljančica (1875-1921).

"Jedina (Uzurlikzurli)" is a rockabilly song which tells the story of a man who would like to tell a girl he loves her but has a problem doing it. "Odbrana" (originally entitled "Isus je naš maj") is a sophisticated song about a lonely man who is far away from everything he loves and who misses his old life by the river. "Glavna ptica (skrati svoj dugački jezik)" is talking about barricades, tear-gas, road blocks which are connected to war, the man in the novel could not understand.

== Live performances ==
Following the release of the album, the band went on tour, but the new album did not reach the audience as their previous releases. The only song which was well accepted by the audience was "Kenozoik" which was usually played first on live appearances.

One of the first live shows the band did was in Zagreb club Kulušić where Dragan Vulinović, who worked in Radio Belgrade as sound engineer, dressed in black and holding a thurible containing incense was walking along the stage as a thurifer. In Belgrade instead of Vulinović this job was given to a girl. The reaction of the critics to using orthodox elements on concerts was described as "Rock with the smell of incense". The shows lasted for more than two hours and had several encore calls.

Since Idoli never recorded a live album and live bootleg recordings are very rare, there are no live recordings from this tour. Vlada Divljan with his Old Stars Band often performed songs from Odbrana i poslednji dani and most of the songs from the album appeared on his live album Odbrana i zaštita in 1996.

== Accolades ==
- It was pronounced the best album and the best album design of the year 1982.
- Odbrana i poslednji dani was one of the few Yugoslav albums reviewed by NME. It received a very positive and affirmative review.
- In 1983, editors and critics from eight leading European magazines (Actuel, The Face, Wiener, etc.) selected Idoli the third among the ten most promising bands in Europe.
- In 1985, Džuboks magazine critics voted Odbrana i poslednji dani the best Yugoslav rock album of the 20th century.
- A special award was given by a French magazine which reviewed the album as one of the best European releases in 1982 along with the releases of Falco, Yello, and Depeche Mode.
- In 2015 the album cover was ranked the 4th on the list of 100 Greatest Album Covers of Yugoslav Rock published by web magazine Balkanrock.

== Re-release ==
The album was one of the first Yugoslav rock albums to be re-released on CD in 1990 with the re-release of Paket aranžman. Since there were mistakes they did not want to release it until 1992 when a record dealer bought the printed releases and sold them in Belgrade at a very high price. There were 40,000 copies and were sold out in a short period of time. In 2007 the album appeared on Croatia Records' box set VIS Idoli featuring all studio efforts except the "Vidici" single.

== Track listing ==
Odbrana i poslednji dani
No.	Title	Writer(s)	Length
1.	"Kenozoik" (Cenozoic)	Divljan, Krstić, Šaper	3:45
2.	"Poslednji dani" (The Last Days)	Divljan	3:16
3.	"Moja si" (You're Mine)	Divljan, Šaper	6:38
4.	"Senke su drugačije" (The Shadows Are Different)	Šaper	2:03
5.	"Nemo"	Divljan, Šaper	3:26
6.	"Nebeska tema" (Heavenly Theme)	Divljan	4:02
7.	"Rusija" (Russia)	Divljan	5:09
8.	"Igrale se Delije" (The Heroes Played)	Divljan, Šaper	2:42
9.	"Jedina (uzurlikzurli)" (The Only One (With The Screaming Of Zurnas))	Divljan	2:23
10.	"Odbrana" (Defense)	Šaper	3:10
11.	"Gde si sad Cica-maco" (Where Are You Now, Kitty Cat)	Divljan	1:52
12.	"Glavna ptica (skrati svoj dugački jezik)" (Main Bird (Watch Your Big Mouth))	Divljan, Kolar, Krstić, Šaper	3:42
13.	"Hajde, sanjaj me, sanjaj" (Come On, Dream Of Me, Dream)	Divljan, Šaper	2:13
Total length:			45:37

== Personnel ==
- Vlada Divljan — guitar, piano, lead vocals
- Nebojša Krstić — percussion, vocals
- Srđan Šaper — synthesizer, vocals
- Zdenko Kolar — bass
- Kokan Popović — drums

=== Guest musicians ===
- Mile Miletić Pile — guitar
- Goran Vejvoda — guitar, synthesizer
- Bebi Dol — backing vocals
- Vuk Vujačić — saxophone
- Goran Grbić — trumpet
- Slobodan Grozdanović — trombone

== Sampling ==
- The same background melody as in the song "Kenozoik", which has performed by guitar, is used in 1995 for the song "Pesma", performed by the Kikinda based group Teatar, thirteen years later.

== External links and references ==
- Odbrana i poslednji dani at Discogs
- Vlada Divljan interview (Serbian source)
- EX YU ROCK enciklopedija 1960-2006, Janjatović Petar; ISBN 978-86-905317-1-4
