= Maljčiki =

1981 single by Idoli

Single by VIS Idoli
- Language: Serbian
- English title: Boys
- B-side: "Retko te viđam sa devojkama"
- Released: 1981
- Recorded: 1980
- Genre: New wave; ska
- Length: 3:20
- Label: Jugoton
- Songwriters: Srđan Šaper; Vlada Divljan
- Producer: Goran Bregović

VIS Idoli singles chronology
| "Pomoć, pomoć" / "Retko te viđam sa devojkama" (1980) | "Maljčiki" (1981) | "Bambina" (1983) |

"Maljčiki" (Serbian Cyrillic: Маљчики; Russian: Мальчики, lit. 'Boys') is the second single by the Serbian and Yugoslav new wave band Idoli. Its re-recorded version appeared on the Yugoslav new wave compilation Paket aranžman, which is one of the most important Yugoslav rock releases.

== History ==
Idoli vocalist Vlada Divljan wanted to come up with a song parody on the Soviet socialist realism. Prior to the release of "Maljčiki", Idoli had written songs on sensitive subjects such as "Retko te viđam sa devojkama" (re-recorded and re-released as the "Maljčiki" single B-side) that hints at male homosexuality, but had not done anything explicitly political. The Soviet embassy condemned the release of the song.

The song depicts a Stakhanov-like proletarian who enthusiastically wakes up in the early dawn to go to work in a mine and a metallurgy factory. The official release of the song featured the following lyrics: "Plamene zore bude me iz sna / Fabrička jutra, dim iz dimnjaka" ("Fiery dawns wake me from my dream / Factory mornings, smoke from the chimney").

However, the original unreleased version of the lyrics was: "Kakane zore bude me iz sna / Kakana jutra, kakan sam i ja" ("Shitty dawns wake me from my dream / Shitty mornings, I am also shitty"). But when the band entered the studio with the producer Goran Bregović, the record label Jugoton did not want to release the song with these lyrics, so they were changed.

The song also included ethnic Russian music elements, and some nonsensical Russian language lyrics that nobody from the band could understand. The Russian language part on the officially released version was narrated by Dragan Papić, who was the band's manager at that time.

A re-recorded version of "Maljčiki" was included in Paket aranžman (1981) compilation. By that time the band was playing on a more expensive equipment, which can be heard on this version. This version was produced by Enco Lesić in place of Bregović.

A live version of "Maljčiki" was included on Divljan's live album Odbrana i zaštita (1996). The single version of the song was included on Croatia Records' 2007 reissue of Idoli's 1981 debut extended play (EP) VIS Idoli.

== Promotional video ==
Promotional video for "Maljčiki" followed the release of the Paket aranžman compilation. The video featured a parody of soc-realist iconography, for example actors posing as miners and metallurgy workers, while the band members, dressed formally in suits and ties posed as apparatchiks. It was broadcast for a first time at the New Year's Eve on the then-popular Rokenroler show on the national television.

SFR Yugoslavia was not a member of the Eastern Bloc but a Non-Aligned country, so the band did not have any significant problems with the authorities concerning the release of the song and video. However, the Soviet embassy sent a protest note to the TV and radio stations which broadcast the song, and some of them banned it.

Even though the band was playing on a good professional equipment, in the video they intentionally used old Slovene and Czech instruments to adjust with the whole concept of the song. The Russian narration part was done on lip sync by Šaper even though the original was recorded by Papić.

== Track listing ==
1. "Maljčiki" (S. Šaper, V. Divljan)
2. "Retko te viđam sa devojkama" (V. Divljan)

== Personnel ==
- Srđan Šaper (vocals, percussion)
- Vlada Divljan (guitar, backing vocals)
- Nebojša Krstić (percussion, backing vocals)
- Zdenko Kolar (bass)
- Boža Jovanović (drums)
- Dragan Papić (narration)

== Legacy ==
In 2006, the song was ranked at number 18 on the B92 Top 100 Domestic Songs list.

== Yugoton version ==
"Malcziki"

Single by Yugoton feat. Kazik

from the album Yugoton
- B-side: Malcziki (yugo-wersja); Malcziki (wersja soute)
- Released: 2001
- Recorded: 2000/2001
- Genre: New wave revival
- Length: 3:29
- Label: ZIC ZAC Music Company; BMG
- Songwriters: (S. Šaper, V. Divljan)

"Malcziki" is a Polish version of the song, and was released as a single from the Yugoslav rock tribute album Yugoton. The version contains lyrics in Polish, and a Russian narrative part from the original lyrics. The track was performed by Kazik and Divljan, who participated in the recording, sang the backing vocals and did the narration part of the song. It was also featured on several Polish rock compilations. The single also featured two more versions, one entirely sung by Divljan.

A promotional video was also recorded for the track.

=== Track listing ===
1. "Malcziki" (3:29)
2. "Malcziki" (yugo-wersja) (3:33)
3. "Malcziki" (wersja soute) (3:31)

== Other versions ==
- An instrumental trumpet version of "Maljčiki" appeared on the Mile sa Čubure vs. Muzička industrija album released by B92 in 2004.
