= Mali čovek =

Single by Šarlo Akrobata

from the album Paket aranžman
- B-side: "Ona se budi"
- Released: 1981
- Recorded: "Druga Maca" studio, Belgrade; 1980
- Genre: New wave, post-punk
- Length: 3:57
- Label: Jugoton
- Songwriter: Šarlo Akrobata
- Producer: Enco Lesić

"Mali čovek" ("Little Man") is the first and only single by Yugoslav new wave band Šarlo Akrobata released in 1981.

== Track listing ==
Both tracks written by Šarlo Akrobata

1. "Mali čovek"
2. "Ona se budi"

== Personnel ==
- Milan Mladenović
- Dušan Kojić Koja
- Ivica Vdović Vd
