= Čokolada =

Studio album by Idoli
- Released: 1983
- Recorded: "Atmosphere" and "Eden" studios, London; June, 1983
- Genre: Pop Rock; Electronic; Funk
- Length: 43:15
- Label: Jugoton
- Producer: Bob Painter

Idoli chronology
Odbrana i poslednji dani (1982)	Čokolada (1983)	Šest dana juna (1985)

Čokolada (Serbian for chocolate) is the second studio album by Yugoslav new wave band Idoli, released in 1983. It is considered to be one of the best selling Yugoslav records, and was ranked #46 on the list of Greatest Yugoslav Rock and Pop Music Albums.

== History ==
Having finished the tour in support of Odbrana i poslednji dani album, the band started working on new material. Since Jugoton was unsatisfied with the sales of Odbrana i poslednji dani, the band had to take on a more commercial sound. In the meantime, bass guitarist Zdenko Kolar left to serve in the Yugoslav People's Army and was temporarily replaced by Branko Isaković.

The band went to London and worked with producer Bob Painter who completely changed their style. The result was Čokolada. Originally planned to be released as a double EP entitled U gradu bez sna, at Jugoton's insistence it was released as a long-playing record. The album turned out to be the greatest commercial success the band had ever achieved. It sold roughly 350,000 copies which, with the Riblja Čorba album Mrtva priroda, made it one of the best-selling albums in Yugoslavia. The record was later overtaken by Plavi Orkestar and Bajaga i Instruktori.

The album cover featured the girl from wrappers on "Seka" chocolates manufactured by Zvečevo from Slavonska Požega. The album design was by the band members themselves with the help of Vladimir Galić and the photographs were by Goranka Matić.

Most of the songs from the album were hits. The romantic "Bambina" and "Stranac u noći", a sentimental piano oriented ballad, were released as a promo single, but due to large popularity, later appeared for sale as well. A lot of funk elements are recognizable on the album, especially on "Soda boj" and "Udri bogataša". The record also featured the ballads "U gradu bez sna" and "Tiho, tiho".

Even though the record credited Nebojša Krstić, Srđan Šaper and Vlada Divljan as the writers of all the tracks, it is known that Divljan did not work much on the album as he was working on his university degree dissertation at the time. He wrote "Radostan dan", "Vetar i zastave" and "Ja sam tu" (partially containing lyrics from the song "Proplakat će zora" written by Drago Britvić, performed by Mišo Kovač on the festival Split 71). Guest appearances included the producer Bob Painter himself on synthesizer and Vivian Goldman on backing vocals.

After the album's release, the band went on an enormously successful tour. The concert in Zagreb featured seven encore calls. However, due to differences within the band, they split up after the Ljubljana show.

== Title track controversy ==
Dušan Gerzić (Via Talas) is the original lyricist for the title track. Srđan Šaper presented it as an Idoli song and Gerzić was later credited as the partial writer of the song "Bambina".

== Track listing ==
Source: Discogs

All lyrics are written by Nebojša Krstić, Srđan Šaper and Vlada Divljan except where noted; all music is composed by Vlada Divljan.

Čokolada
No.	Title	Lyrics	Length
1.	"Čokolada" (Chocolate)		3:34
2.	"Radostan dan" (Joyful Day)		2:53
3.	"Tiho, tiho" (Quietly, Quietly)		4:30
4.	"Bambina"	Krstić, Šaper, Divljan, Dušan Gerzić	3:08
5.	"Ja sam tu" (I am Here)	Krstić, Šaper, Divljan, Drago Britvić	2:52
6.	"Soda boj" (Soda Boy)		4:29
7.	"Vetar i zastave" (Wind and Flags)		5:06
8.	"Stranac u noći" (Stranger in the Night)		4:31
9.	"U gradu bez sna" (In a City Without a Dream)		3:59
10.	"Udri bogataša" (Hit the Richman)		7:53

== Personnel ==
- Vlada Divljan (guitar, vocals)
- Nebojša Krstić (percussion, vocals)
- Srđan Šaper (synthesizer, vocals)
- Branko Isaković (bass guitar)
- Kokan Popović (drums)

=== Guest appearances ===
- Vivian Goldman (backing vocals)
- Bob Painter (synthesizer)

== Legacy ==
In 2015 Čokolada album cover was ranked 31st on the list of 100 Greatest Album Covers of Yugoslav Rock published by web magazine Balkanrock.
