= Warszawa '81 =

EP by Električni Orgazam
- Released: 1981
- Recorded: November 7, 8 and 9 Warsaw
- Genre: New wave, post-punk
- Producer: Slobodan Konjović

Warszawa '81 is an EP by the Serbian new wave band Električni Orgazam. The EP was recorded live during the three dates tour in Warsaw, Poland. The cover, designed by Srđan Gojković Gile featured the Polish language version of the band's name, Elektryczny Orgazm. The EP was rereleased by Yellow Dog records in 1996.

== The EP ==
=== Track listing ===
1. "Električni orgazam" (Gojković) (4:05)
2. "Razgovori" (Mazagro) (1:50)
3. "Konobar" (Đukić) (3:09)
4. "Leptir" (Mazagro) (3:09)
5. "Vi" (Vukićević, Gojković) (2:14)
6. "I've Got a Feeling" (Lennon, McCartney) (2:22)

== Integral version ==
Warszawa '81

Live album by Električni Orgazam
- Released: 1996
- Recorded: November 7 Warsaw
- Genre: New wave, post-punk
- Length: 43:03
- Language: Serbian
- Label: Yellow Dog Records

Električni Orgazam live chronology
Balkan Horror Rock II (1993)	Warszawa '81 (1996)	Živo i akustično (1996)

=== Track listing ===
1. "Elektricni orgazam" (4:07)
2. "Bomba" (2:16)
3. "Devojke" (1:43)
4. "Odelo" (2:08)
5. "Afrika" (2:03)
6. "Razgovori" (1:54)
7. "Podstanar" (1:47)
8. "Leptir" (3:25)
9. "Konobar" (1:09)
10. "Voda u moru" (3:56)
11. "I've Got a Feeling" (3:03)
12. "Dokolica" (2:30)
13. "Vi" (2:18)
14. "Krokodili dolaze" (3:44)
15. "Nebo" (3:44)
16. "Zlatni papagaj" (3:16)

== Personnel ==
- Srđan Gojković Gile (guitar, vocals)
- Ljubomir Jovanović Jovec (drums, guitar)
- Ljubomir Đukić Ljuba (keyboards, vocals)
- Jovan Jovanović Grof (bass)
- Branko Kuštrin Mango (drums)
