= Retko te viđam sa devojkama =

Single by VIS Idoli
- Language: Serbian
- English title: I Rarely See You With Girls
- A-side: "Pomoć, pomoć"
- B-side: "Poklon"
- Released: May 1980
- Recorded: 1980
- Genre: New wave
- Length: 3:17
- Label: Vidici
- Songwriter: Vlada Divljan

VIS Idoli singles chronology
"Pomoć, pomoć" / "Retko te viđam sa devojkama" (1980)	"Maljčiki" (1981)

"Retko te viđam sa devojkama" (transl. I Rarely See You With Girls) is the second song which appeared on the first single by Serbian new wave band Idoli (the first being "Pomoć, pomoć").

== History ==
The band recorded two songs which would appear as the A-side of the single given as a present with the May release of the Vidici magazine. The song did not actually appear as a B-side as both of the songs appeared on the A-side, while the B-side contained Slobodan Škerović's narrative poem called "Poklon".

The song is widely regarded as one of the first Yugoslav, or more precisely, the first Serbian song about homosexuality (the first Yugoslav one was "Neki dječaci" by Prljavo Kazalište from Zagreb, Croatia). The main focal point of the lyrics is a young man who is rarely seen amongst members of the opposite sex.

== Track listing ==
A-side
No.	Title	Writer(s)	Performer(s)	Length
1.	"Pomoć, pomoć"	Vlada Divljan	Idoli	1:29
2.	"Retko te viđam sa devojkama"	Divljan	Idoli	3:17
Total length:				4:46

B-side
No.	Title	Lyrics	Performer(s)	Length
1.	"Poklon"	Slobodan Škerović	Škerović	4:42

== Personnel ==
A-side

- Vlada Divljan (guitar, vocals)
- Srđan Šaper (percussion, vocals)
- Nebojša Krstić (percussion)
- Zdenko Kolar (bass guitar)
- Boža Jovanović (drums)

B-side

- Slobodan Škerović (vocals)
- Žarko Kalmić (piano)

== Second version ==
"Retko te viđam sa devojkama"

Song by VIS Idoli
- Language: Serbian
- English title: I Rarely See You With Girls
- A-side: "Maljčiki"
- Released: 1981
- Recorded: 1981
- Genre: New wave; post-punk
- Length: 3:05
- Label: Jugoton
- Songwriter: Vlada Divljan
- Producer: Goran Bregović

"Retko te viđam sa devojkama" was recorded once again in Zagreb with producer Goran Bregović and was released as a B-side of the "Maljčiki" (1981) single. This version of the song also appeared on the Svi marš na ples! (1981) compilation.

== Track listing ==
A-side
No.	Title	Writer(s)	Producer	Length
1.	"Maljčiki"	Srđan Šaper; Vlada Divljan	Goran Bregović	3:20

B-side
No.	Title	Writer(s)	Producer	Length
1.	"Retko te viđam sa devojkama"	Divljan	Bregović	3:05

== Personnel ==
- Vlada Divljan (guitar, vocals)
- Srđan Šaper (percussion, vocals)
- Nebojša Krstić (percussion)
- Zdenko Kolar (bass guitar)
- Boža Jovanović (drums)

== Cover versions ==
- A Polish version of the song, entitled "Rzadko widuje cie z dziewczętami", appeared on the Yugoton tribute album and was performed by Kasia Nosowska and Paweł Kukiz in 2001.
- Serbian hardcore punk band Lude Krawe recorded a version of the song on their 2007 album Sve tuđe.
- A cover of the song by the Croatian pop-punk band Luzeri, entitled "Rijetko te viđam sa djevojkama", was played in the episode "Have You Ever Been in Love with a Girl?" of the Croatian TV series Sram.
