= Kokan Popović =

Slobodan Popović
- Also known as: Kokan
- Genres: New wave, art rock, experimental, rock, pop rock
- Instruments: Drums, Guitar, Vocals
- Years active: 1976 – present

Slobodan "Kokan" Popović is a Serbian drummer notable for playing in bands Idoli and Propaganda.

== Biography ==
=== Getting interested in music, first bands ===
Popović was born in Belgrade and lived at Alekse Nenadovica street connecting "Slavija" and "Metropol" hotel, inhabited by people from highest social positions, such as lawyers, politicians, musicians, sportsman, etc., to the lowest, such as prostitutes, drug dealers, thieves, etc.

In his early youth he brought some LP compilations of Opatija festivals and played them while using a wooden cigarette box as a drum and after hearing The Who's album A Quick One, he decided to become a drummer. His real drum practices started after moving to Bombay with his father (then being in Yugoslavian Foreign Services), Dejan and mother Božica (sister Dubravka - stood in Belgrade) where he, for the first time, had the chance to practice on a real drum set. His first live appearance was at a Bombay college anniversary.

On return to Belgrade Popović first joined the band Dag, with whom he recorded a single "Voz" / "Smiljana" in 1973. After Dag, he formed a hard rock trio Jocker, and then Jesen before joining the band of Slađana Milošević.

=== Zvuk Ulice and Propaganda ===
In 1976, guitarist and singer, Vlada Divljan, and bass guitarist, Zdenko Kolar, formed a band called Merlin. The band also included Popović on drums, keyboard player Dragan Mitrić, Bora Atić on saxophone and Dragana Milković on piano and vocals. Beside their own songs the band often performed songs by Jimi Hendrix, The Beatles and The Rolling Stones. Their musical style was a combination of melodic rock, jazz rock and hard rock. The band often performed at Belgrade's SKC (Studentski Kulturni Centar a.k.a. SKC or Students Cultural Centre), appeared on the last BOOM festival in Novi Sad and Zaječar Guitar festival. They did not have any releases, but had some recordings, recorded in Radio Belgrade studio, which were broadcast from time to time.

In early 1979 Popović's future wife got pregnant and he also had to serve the Yugoslav People's Army which caused the breaking up of the band. He made a two-year break and joined Idoli.

In 1982 Popović (guitar, vocals) with Mitrić (keyboards), Branko Isaković (bass, rhythm guitar) and Nenad Morgenstern (percussion) formed the off project Propaganda. The band recorded only one album, Apatija javnosti which partially featured material from Zvuk Ulice period. The sound was a Pop rock combined with other musical forms. After the album release, the band split up.

=== Idoli ===
Popović joined Idoli as a replacement for Boža Jovanović. The band started recording their first long play album in Radio Belgrade studios during the late 1981 and early 1982. Odbrana i poslednji dani surprised the critics as much as the fans. It was named after Borislav Pekić's eponymous book, on which the whole album is based. It is a complex concept album dealing with an anthropological approach towards Orthodox Christianity. Since the album was sold in only 50,000 copies, which was considered a failure by Jugoton the band had to completely turn towards commercial music.

The next release was the album Čokolada featuring bassist Branko Isaković instead of Zdenko Kolar who went to serve the Yugoslav People's Army. It was recorded in London with producer Bob Painter who completely changed the band's style. The record was sold in 350,000 copies which was a record at that time in Yugoslavia. Even though the band had a successful tour, the relationships between the band members became colder. After the Ljubljana show due to a quarrel, Idoli ceased to exist.

The last release as Idoli was a soundtrack album for Šest dana juna which was written by Divljan while the rest of the band recorded their parts.

=== Post-Idoli career ===
After Idoli disbanded Popović joined the band Mučenici and also played with a super-session band Kod Tri Balona (featuring Disciplina Kičme bassist Dušan Kojić Koja and Električni Orgazam guitarist Branislav Petrović Banana).

In the early nineties he moved to Johannesburg, South Africa and formed his own band The Traitors. The lineup featured Belgrade musicians living in Johannesburg: Popović on rhythm guitar and vocals and Marka Benini on drums, with musicians from South Africa Derrick Skihippers (lead guitar) and Kahlan Merchant (bass guitar). The band performs a heavier version of rock and roll standards.

In 2006 Kokan & The Traitors performed in Belgrade and Zdenko Kolar appeared as guest musician.

== Discography ==
=== With Dag ===
- "Voz" / "Smiljana" (PGP RTB, 1973)

=== With Propaganda ===
- Apatija javnosti (PGP RTB, 1982)

== External links and references ==
- EX YU ROCK enciklopedija 1960-2006, Janjatović Petar; ISBN 978-86-905317-1-4
- Kokan Popović at Discogs
- Kokan Popović at Popboks
