= Zdenko Kolar =

Serbian bass guitarist

Zdenko Kolar Зденко Колар
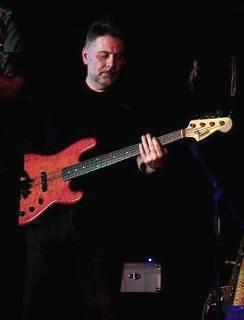
- Zdenko Kolar performing live with Vlada Divljan & Nevladina Organizacija in 2010

Background information
- Born: 1956 (age 69–70); Zemun, PR Serbia, FPR Yugoslavia
- Genres: New wave, punk rock, art rock, rock, blues
- Instruments: Bass guitar, vocals
- Years active: 1969–present

Zdenko Kolar (Serbian Cyrillic: Зденко Колар) is a Serbian bass guitarist, most notable as the member of Idoli and Zona B.

== Biography ==
Kolar was born in Zemun in 1956 where he lived until 1963 when he moved to inner town in Belgrade. He moved to a building where two of his future bandmates lived, Vlada Divljan and Boža Jovanović. In an interview Kolar noted that Divljan was the first boy he had met in his new neighborhood on the day his family was moving in.

=== First musical steps ===
In 1968 Divljan decided to take up playing and so did Kolar. Divljan managed to get a mandolin and later bought a guitar while Kolar got his first guitar by getting a vacuum cleaner on a newspaper lottery. His parents sold the vacuum cleaner and bought him a guitar. The two started learning how to play while watching others play in their neighborhood at the places where the young were gathering. Later they went to a guitar course at RU "Braća Stamenković" held by professor Branko Perišić.

In the meantime Kolar, Divljan and Boža Jovanović formed a band called Faraoni (Pharaohs) as Divljan at the time had a necklace from Egypt. The band was soon renamed to Hoplipe when the three found out there was a popular band from Kopar called Faraoni. In May 1969 the three had a very successful appearance at their school which Zdenko credits as the beginning of his musical career.

=== Zvuk Ulice ===
The first serious band Kolar and Divljan formed in 1976 called MARILYN (after youthful infatuation with Marilyn Monroe – but the first concert that was to be played in I Bgd Gimnasia featured newly ordered T-shirts from USA which came misspelled, so the name was promptly changed to MERLIN (the magician)) which was soon renamed to Zvuk Ulice. The lineup featured Vlada Divljan first only on guitar and vocals, Kolar on bass, Kokan Popović on drums, Dragan Mitrić on keyboards, Bora Antić on saxophone and Dragana Milković on piano and vocals. The band played a combination of melodic rock, hard rock and jazz rock. Beside their own tracks they also performed songs by The Beatles, The Rolling Stones, Jimi Hendrix, etc.

The band had recording sessions at Radio Belgrade and the recordings were broadcast on radio stations, but were never released. They performed at the last BOOM Festival in Novi Sad and Zaječar Gitarijada festival in 1979. Since the drummer, Kokan Popović, had to go to serve the Yugoslav People's Army the band split up.

=== Dečaci plus Bradonje, Idoli ===
In late 1979 Divljan created a conceptual band called Dečaci (The Boys) with Nebojša Krstić and Srđan Šaper. The three, with Dragan Papić who was a kind of media activist. He published photographs of Dečaci in youth magazines "Vidici" and "Izgled". In the meantime the three tried to play together but without progress. Then Divljan invited Kolar and Boža Jovanović to join the band and, since both Kolar and Jovanović wore beards, the band was renamed to Dečaci plus Bradonje (The Boys plus The Bearded).

On 1 March 1980 the band was renamed to Idoli on the first official rehearsal held that day. A month later Papić made a deal with "Vidici" to finance the recording of the first Idoli single which was released as a present with a copy of the magazine. The single "Pomoć, pomoć" / "Retko te viđam sa devojkama" became a local hit. The next single was released for Jugoton and performed the Festival Omladina with the song "Zašto su danas devojke ljute".

In the meantime Idoli, with Električni Orgazam and Šarlo Akrobata participated the Paket aranžman compilation. Kolar was credited as writer on the track "Amerika" which appeared to be the only Idoli song he appeared as writer. The release proved to be one of the most influential Yugoslav rock releases. The band also prepared their debut record which came out to be a six-song EP entitled VIS Idoli it was a huge success and was sold in about 200.000. After the release of the EP, Jovanović left the band and was replaced by Kolar's and Divljan's former bandmate Kokan Popović.

In late 1981 the band entered the studio to record their first long play album. Odbrana i poslednji dani was released in early 1982 and proved to be a high appreciated album by the critics and a part of the fans, but due to non-commercial approach and sound, considered a failure by Jugoton. The album was voted the best in 1982 and had the best album design. In 1985 Džuboks magazine voted the album to be the best Yugoslav rock album of the 20th century. The band had a tour following the record release after which Kolar left the band to serve the Yugoslav People's Army and was replaced by Branko Isaković.

By the time Kolar came back from the army, the band had already split up. Together with Branko Isaković, Kolar recorded bass parts on the last Idoli release which is the "Šest dana juna" soundtrack album. After Idoli split up, Kolar took a break with playing and got employed as trolley bus driver. He also worked as an actor in TV commercials.

=== Zona B, work with Vlada Divljan ===
In 1987 Kolar joined a blues band Zona B. In 1989 after several lineup changes the band featured Jovan Savić Lole (vocals), Dušan Bezuha Duda (guitar), Tomislav Rakijaš Toma (guitar), Vladimir Filipović Buca (keyboards), Dušan Ristic-Rista (drums), and Zdenko Kolar-Zdene (bass guitar). The band performed blues classics on numerous appearances in Serbia and became one of the greatest Serbian club attractions. Kolar also played in Vlada Divljan's band on Tajni život A. P. Šandorova tour.

In 1991 Zona B released their debut album entitled Bestseller featuring cover versions of blues classics. The album was released by PGP RTB and was produced by Dušan Bezuha. The next release was also a cover album, Juke-Box (released in 1993), this time featuring two Zona B songs written by Bezuha and Savić, My Woman and Don't Put Me Down. This release was the last featuring Savić, Rakijaš and Filipović.

In 1995 Kolar became the bassist of the Vlada Divljan backing band called the Old Stars Band also featuring Aleksandar Šandorov (keyboards), Srđan Gojković Gile (guitar, vocals), Marko Milivojević (drums) and Boris Bunjac (percussion). The band had two concerts at Novi Sad sad Studio "M", an NS Plus Unplugged and a regular show with electric equipment on 18 and 23 January 1996. The material recorded from the shows was released on a live album entitled Odbrana i zaštita released through B92 Records. Divljan returned to Australia and Kolar continued working with Zona B. Kolar also appeared in the "Lepa sela lepo gore" movie as Mirovnjak and "Sudbina jednog razuma" TV drama in 1996. He also appeared on the Električni Orgazam unplugged album as the band announcer.

The second time Divljan returned to Yugoslavia Kolar and the rest of the Old Stars Band recorded a soundtrack album for "Tri palme za dve bitange i ribicu" ("Three Palms Trees on the Isle Of Happiness"). They also had a successful tour in Slovenia in July 1998. When the tour ended Divljan and the Old Stars Band entered the studio in Novi Sad and recorded the Sve laži sveta album which was released in 2000 due to political situation in the country. In the meantime Vlada Divljan moved to Vienna.

Petar Pera Zarija (vocals), Pop Mašina and Rok Mašina former member Zoran Božinović (guitar, vocals) – brother of guitarist Vidoja Božinović (Dim Bez Vatre, Pop Mašina, Dah, Opus, Rok Mašina and Riblja Čorba), and Ljuba Đordević (harmonica) became new Zona B members. The new lineup performed the song "Negde daleko", which is a cover of a Pop Mašina hit, which appeared on the Blues Summit Coupe Vol. 1 compilation. By the time Pirat was released, Đordević left the band so the band featured guitarist and producer Dragan Dadi Stojanović in 1999.

In 2002 Vlada Divljan started working on the Die Tonzentrale project featuring Kolar on bass. The album came out in 2003 as Vlada Divljan presents Die Tonzentrale. The style of the album was a combination of jazz, blues, pop, rock and electronic music. Zona B released a new record Original featuring only Zona B tracks in 2005. The album, like the previous was released by Duda Bezuha. Kolar also appeared as guest on Električni Orgazam album Harmonajzer in 2002 as backing vocalist.

In 2007 Zona B released the Devil Blues album and celebrated their 20th anniversary. The album design was done by Kolar. He also performed with the Old Stars Band, later reformed as Vlada Divljan & Nevladina Organizacija.

== Discography ==
=== With Vlada Divljan ===
==== Studio albums ====
- Sve laži sveta (Automatik, 2000) – as Vlada Divljan Old Stars Band
- Vlada Divljan presents Die Tonzentrale (B92 Records, 2003) – as Die Tonzentrale

==== Live albums ====
- Odbrana i zaštita (B92 Records, 1996) – as Vlada Divljan Old Stars Band

==== Soundtracks ====
- Tri palme za dve bitange i ribicu (Favi, 1998)

=== With Zona B ===
==== Studio albums ====
- Bestseller (PGP RTB, 1991)
- Juke-Box (PGP RTS, 1993)
- Pirat (Round Records, 1999)
- Original (One Records, 2005)
- Devil Blues (One Records, 2007)

==== Live albums ====
- Zdravo-živo – Aleksinac 11 August 2006 (2007) – Official bootleg

==== Various artists compilations ====
- Belgrade The Blues Today Vol. 1 (PGP RTS, 1994)
- Blues Summit Coupe Vol. 1 (One Records, 2000)
- Blues Summit Coupe Vol. 2 (One Records, 2000)

=== Guest appearances ===
==== Studio albums ====
- Godine ljubavi (PGP RTB, 1982) – bassist on the debut U Škripcu album
- Harmonajzer (PGP RTS, 2002) – backing vocals on the Električni Orgazam 2002 album

==== Live albums ====
- Živo i akustično (B92 Records, 1996) – announcer on the Električni Orgazam unplugged album

== External links and references ==
- EX YU ROCK enciklopedija 1960–2006, Janjatović Petar; ISBN 978-86-905317-1-4
- Official Zona B page
- Zdenko Kolar discography at Discogs
- Zdenko Kolar at IMDb
- Vlada Divljan interview (Serbian source)
