= Paket aranžman =

Paket Aranžman

Compilation album by Šarlo Akrobata, Idoli and Električni Orgazam
- Released: 18 February 1981
- Recorded: 1980
- Studio: Druga Maca Studio (Belgrade, Yugoslavia)
- Genre: New wave; punk rock; post-punk
- Length: 35:33
- Language: Serbian; German
- Label: Jugoton
- Producer: Enco Lesić

Šarlo Akrobata chronology
Paket aranžman (1981)	Bistriji ili tuplji čovek biva kad... (1981)

Idoli chronology
Paket aranžman (1981)	VIS Idoli (1981)

Električni Orgazam chronology
Paket aranžman (1981)	Električni orgazam (1981)

Singles from Paket aranžman
- 1. "Mali čovek" / "Ona se budi" Released: 1981

Alternative cover
- 2007 box set reissue cover

Professional ratings
Review scores
Source	Rating
Terapija.net	not rated link

Paket aranžman (Serbian Cyrillic: Пакет аранжман, lit. 'Package Deal') is a new wave compilation album released in 1981 by Jugoton. Featuring eminent Belgrade acts Šarlo Akrobata, Idoli and Električni Orgazam, it is considered to be one of the most important and influential records ever made in SFR Yugoslavia. In addition to critical praise, it reached a cult status among the audiences and continues to be popular across the countries that emerged after the breakup of Yugoslavia.

The album was voted the second best Yugoslav rock album of all time by the music critics in the book YU 100: najbolji albumi jugoslovenske rok i pop muzike. It is second only to Odbrana i poslednji dani by Idoli.

The record was produced by Enco Lesić who initiated the entire project.

== Background and recording ==
During autumn 1980, Belgrade record producer Enco Lesić decided to assemble several young acts from the city's emerging new wave scene in order to come up with a split album that would present and promote the work of these young bands. He brought in three bands consisting of young musicians in their early twenties—Šarlo Akrobata, Idoli and Električni Orgazam—all three of which barely existed for several months in their current format at that point and virtually had no prior recording experience.

Lesić gave them free recording time in his Druga Maca Studio, as well as complete artistic freedom.

The sleeve was designed by Branko Gavrić, while the photographs used on it were shot by Milinko Stefanović (the wide shot of Belgrade streets on the cover) and Goran Vejvoda (photos within the sleeve). The main sound engineer was Dušan Vasiljević.

== Track listing ==
Side one
No.	Title	Writer(s)	Length
1.	"Ona se budi" (Šarlo Akrobata)	Šarlo Akrobata	3:55
2.	"Krokodili dolaze" (Električni Orgazam)	Srđan Gojković; Ljubomir Đukić	3:05
3.	"Oko moje glave" (Šarlo Akrobata)	Šarlo Akrobata	2:45
4.	"Schwüle über Europa (Omorina nad Evropom)" (Idoli)	Srđan Šaper; Vlada Divljan	4:22
5.	"Mali čovek" (Šarlo Akrobata)	Šarlo Akrobata	2:10
6.	"Plastika" (Idoli)	Divljan	1:40
Total length:			17:57

Side two
No.	Title	Writer(s)	Length
7.	"Maljčiki" (Idoli)	Šaper; Divljan	3:18
8.	"Zlatni papagaj" (Električni Orgazam)	Gojković	2:02
9.	"Amerika" (Idoli)	Divljan; Zdenko Kolar	8:06
10.	"Vi" (Električni Orgazam)	Gojković; Snežana Vukičević; Ljubomir Jovanović	1:50
11.	"Niko kao ja" (Šarlo Akrobata)	Šarlo Akrobata	1:30
Total length:			16:46

Notes

- "Krokodili dolaze" and "Vi" were reworked for Električni Orgazam's debut studio album Električni orgazam (1981).
- A version of "Maljčiki" produced by Goran Bregović was released as a single. The version included on Paket aranžman is a re-recorded one, produced by Lesić. The single version of the song was later included in the 2007 reissue of Idoli's 1981 EP VIS Idoli.

== Reissue ==
In March 2007, Jugoton's successor Croatia Records reissued the compilation as a box set release, featuring its remastered version on CD 1, while CDs 2 and 3 featured Električni orgazam (1981) by Električni Orgazam and Bistriji ili tuplji čovek biva kad... (1981) by Šarlo Akrobata, respectively. The track listings and album covers used were the same as on the original releases. On 5 July 2007, Croatia Records re-released all Idoli releases on VIS Idoli box set.

Once again, Paket aranžman, as well as Bistriji ili tuplji čovek biva kad…, Haustor (1981) and Električni orgazam were reissued on LP as part of the celebration of 40 years of new wave. The four aforementioned vinyl records came in a gatefold packaging with additional texts, photographs, and memorabilia. All songs have been remastered at the Croatia Records Studio by Goran Martinac, and each edition was accompanied by a download code for obtaining MP3 versions of all the songs. All vinyl records are colored, and the remastered albums are also available on all streaming services. Alongside these releases, Croatian Music Channel (CMC), in collaboration with Croatia Records, has produced a documentary film titled Novi val – 40 godina nakon (New Wave – 40 Years Later), which was screened throughout the region, with an exclusive premiere held at the Youth Center in Belgrade.

== Charts ==
Chart performance for Paket aranžman
Chart (2021)	Peak position
Croatian Domestic Albums (HDU)	1

== See also ==
- Artistička radna akcija
- Novi Punk Val
- Svi marš na ples!
- Vrući dani i vrele noći
- New wave music in Yugoslavia
- Punk rock in Yugoslavia

== External links and references ==
- Paket Aranžman box at Croatia Records official page
- "Paket Aranžman" and "Artistička radna akcija" compilations - Review at terapija.net e-zine (in Croatian)
- (in Croatian)

Citations
