= Vlada Divljan =

Serbian musician

Vlada Divljan Влада Дивљан
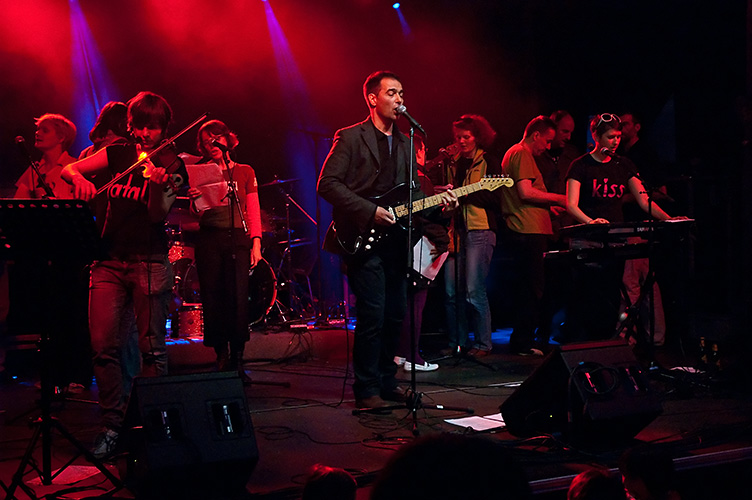
- Vlada Divljan performing live in 2010

Background information
- Born: 10 May 1958; Belgrade, PR Serbia, FPR Yugoslavia
- Origin: Belgrade, Serbia
- Died: 5 March 2015 (aged 56) Vienna, Austria
- Genres: new wave; punk rock; rock; pop rock; art rock; electronic; experimental
- Occupations: singer; songwriter
- Instruments: vocals; guitar; piano; drums
- Years active: 1968–2015
- Labels: Izgled; Jugoton; PGP RTB; Zabava miliona; B92 Records; Favi; Automatik; Odličan Hrčak
- Formerly of: Idoli; Apartchiks; Die Tonzentrale

Vladimir "Vlada" Divljan (Serbian Cyrillic: Владимир "Влада" Дивљан; 10 May 1958 – 5 March 2015), was a Serbian singer and songwriter. He was known as the frontman of the Serbian and Yugoslav rock band Idoli, one of the bands which initiated the Yugoslav new wave on the music and cultural scene of Yugoslavia in the 1980s, as well as for his solo works.

== Early career ==
=== Early activity ===
Divljan got interested in music in 1968, after a Drago Diklić concert in Tučepi, a seaside resort where he went on a holiday with his family. After coming back to Belgrade he asked Zdenko Kolar and Boža Jovanović, two of his friends and neighbors, to form a band. The first instrument Divljan played was a small mandolin because he was a fan of Dubrovački trubaduri. Later he got a guitar, Kolar bought a bass and Boža Jovanović used a tin barrel as a drum with metal sticks made by Kolar's father. The band was called Faraoni (Pharaohs) since Divljan had a necklace from Egypt, given by his grandmother, with a Tutankhamun medallion. Since there was a popular band from Koper named Faraoni, the band was renamed to Holipe. Both Divljan and Kolar attended guitar course at the RU "Braća Stamenković" held by professor Branko Perišić who later appeared in the "Sve laži sveta" video.

To have rehearsals the three would skip school. The rehearsals were held at the boiler-room in their building. The three had rehearsals there for about ten years. They held a free gig at the Dadov's upper floor.

=== Zvuk ulice ===
The first serious band Divljan formed after graduation, in 1976 called Merlin soon renamed to Zvuk Ulice (Sound of the Street). The band featured Divljan (guitar, vocals), Zdenko Kolar (bass), Dragan Mitrić (keyboards), Kokan Popović (drums) and Bora Atić (saxophone) The band was a combination of melodic rock, hard rock and jazz rock. The band performed cover versions of The Beatles, Rolling Stones, Jimi Hendrix songs and their own songs. The band performed at Zaječar Guitar festival and Novi Sad BOOM festival. They also had some sessions at Radio Belgrade but due to Kokan Popović's departure to serve the army, the band ceased to exist.

== Dečaci and Idoli ==
In late 1979, Divljan, a college student, met his close high school friend Srđan Šaper at a party. Šaper, a student at University of Belgrade's Faculty of Medicine and his friend Nebojša Krstić decided to form a band and Divljan jokingly offered to be the band's drummer. He took Šaper and Nebojša Krstić to his building's basement where he had rehearsals and where Kolar's and his equipment was placed. Having realized that the two could not play bass and guitar as they planned, Divljan invited his old friends Kolar on bass and Jovanović on drums, so the band had musician and non-musician factions. The band was called Dečaci (The Boys). At the same time Dečaci met Dragan Papić, photographer and journalist, who became the band's creative mentor, who published Dečaci photos in a well known youth magazine Vidici. The photos had subtitles featuring gay-hinting comments. It was a conceptual band without recordings.

While the public got interested in the band through photos and graffiti which could be seen on Belgrade's walls, the band had to show some proof of existence. Dečaci were renamed to Idoli (The Idols) on 1 March 1980 at the first rehearsal on which Divljan wrote the first song "Retko te viđam sa devojkama" ("I Rarely See You With Girls"), one of the first gay-hinting songs ever written in Yugoslavia. In a month's period "Retko te viđam sa devojkama" and "Pomoć, pomoć" were recorded and released as a present with the April release of "Vidici" magazine. The positive reviews opened many doors to Idoli including an opportunity to sign a contract with Jugoton a major Yugoslav record label. By the time Maljčiki single came out Idoli were already working on the Paket aranžman (Package Deal), a various artists compilation which proved to be one of the most influential Yugoslav rock releases. The next release was the VIS Idoli EP featuring six new songs. Divljan appeared as writer and lead vocalist for most of the tracks. The EP was sold in about 200.000 copies.

For the recording of the first album Kokan Popović, Zvuk Ulice drummer, became the new Idoli drummer. Odbrana i poslednji dani was released in early 1982. The album represents a conceptual effort dealing with an anthropological approach towards orthodoxy. Divljan beside guitar played piano and provided lead vocals for most of the tracks. Odbrana tour proved to be a success unlike the album which was sold in 50.000 copies. The record company considered a failure even though it was pronounced the best album and best album design of 1982. Foreign magazines also released positive critics and in 1985 "Džuboks" pronounced Odbrana i poslednji dani the best Yugoslav rock record of the 20th century.

The next release was recorded in London with producer Bob Painter. Zdenko Kolar went to the army and was replaced by Branko Isaković. The sound was strictly commercial and proved to be the band's greatest success. For Čokolada Divljan did not put a lot of effort as he was preparing a university degree at the time. He wrote Radostan dan", "Vetar i zastave" and "Ja sam tu" (for which Divljan added a verse from Mišo Kovač track "Plakat će zora" written by Drago Britvić).

After the Ljubljana show, on Čokolada tour, the band members had a quarrel which resulted in the breakup of Idoli. The last Idoli release was a soundtrack album for Šest dana juna movie for which Jugoton insisted to be released as an Idoli album. The entire soundtrack was written by Divljan (he considers this album his first solo release), while the rest of the band plus some guests recorded their parts.

== Solo career ==
=== Yugoslav years (1985–1991) ===
When Idoli disbanded, Divljan had an idea of forming a band Hondini Sinovi (Honda's Sons) featuring Branko Isaković on bass, Ivan Stančić Piko on drums and Dragomir Mihajlović "Gagi" on guitar, but decided to pursue a solo career.

The album Tajni život A. P. Šandorova was recorded with Aleksandar Šandorov who used to work only on classical music. Keyboard player Đorđe Petrović also appeared on the album. The album brought a variety of musical styles, instrumentals "1986" and "1987", minimalistic swing "Neću ništa da znam" ("I Don't Want To Know Anything"), ballad "Više nisam tu" ("I Am Not Here Anymore") and sampled hit "Patuljci" ("Gnomes"). For the first time Divljan used sampled music, including sound recordings of Zastava 750 engine, glass breaking, cricket and anvil percussion sounds. The tour for Tajni život A. P. Šandorova featured Zdenko Kolar on bass, Aleksandar Šandorov on keyboards and Marko Milivojević on drums. He also appeared live with the Film faction Le Cinema and the song "Maršal" ("Poslednji dani" with the missing verse) appeared on Le Cinema's live album Rocking at the Party Live! released by Suzy Records in 1989.

For the soundtrack of "Čovek u beloj jakni" ("Man in a White Jacket") TV series, Divljan recorded cover version of The Beatles songs mainly from their self titled record also known as the White Album. He recorded songs for the TV show "Podijum" ("The Stage"), for the "Kako je propao rokenrol" ("The Fall Of Rock 'n' Roll") omnibus movie, Divljan recorded soundtrack for the "Do izvora dva putića" ("Two Paths To The Spring") section directed by Zoran Pez. With Srđan Gojković Gile of Električni Orgazam he participated the theater piece "Rokenrol za decu" ("Rock 'n' Roll For Children") and the music from the piece was released on a record and featured cover versions of popular children songs. Rokenrol bukvar (Rock 'n' Roll Alphabet) was another children's music project this time a soundtrack of the famous Ljubivoje Ršumović children TV show "Fazoni i fore".

During 1990 Divljan, Piko Stančić, Gile and Zoran Radomirović Švaba released the album Lutka koja kaže ne (A Doll Who Says No) featuring lyrics by Divljan and Gile and a cover version of Đorđe Marjanović's song "Lutka koja kaže ne" (originally composed by French singer Michel Polnareff and it was his debut song "La Poupée qui fait non"). The track "Vi ž'tem mon amur", dedicated to Serge Gainsbourg and his hit "Je t'aime... moi non-plus", featured samples of the recordings by Black Sabbath, Time, intro by Žika Jelić, YU grupa bassist, for "Kosovski božuri" recorded live at BOOM pop festival and the voice of Milena Dravić taken from her aerobics tape. A cover version of the song "Srećan ti rođendan" ("Happy Birthday"), which Divljan wrote for Slađana Milošević, also appeared on the album. In the Summer of 1991 Divljan helped Srđan Gojković Gile on his second solo project which is actually the "Crni bombarder" ("The Black Bomber") soundtrack album.

=== Australian years (1991–1998) ===
In August 1991 Divljan moved to Australia following his girlfriend Ruth, whom he would marry in 1991; they divorced in 1997. He started playing rock standards with local bands, collaborated with singer Max Sharam and worked in a local Serbian radio station. Having started working on TV and movie soundtracks he joined the Movie Composer's Society and in 1996 enrolled in Sound studies of the Movie Academy at the University of Sydney. He received the "Audio Excellence" award by Ampex Corporation for the short "Flying Over Mother" for which he did sound design and music. He was also awarded by the CBS for the silent short "Drip".

During a short visit to Serbia in late 1995 / early 1996, he formed the Old Stars Band with Aleksandar Šandorov (keyboards), Zdenko Kolar (bass), Srđan Gojković Gile (guitar, vocals), Marko Milivojević (drums) and Boris Bunjac (percussion). The band held two concerts at Novi Sad Studio "M", of which one acoustic, on 18 and 23 January 1996. The material recorded from the shows was released on a live album entitled Odbrana i zaštita through B92 Records.

In January 1997 back in Australia Divljan worked on a project with Leb i Sol keyboardist Kiril Džajkovski titled "Apartchiks". The first CD titled Dekada (Decade), released by Avant Garde Records, features four tracks with sampled speeches by Slobodan Milošević. The next release, Recorded Supplement, features nine tracks where Divljan and Džajkovski explore contemporary music.

=== Back in Serbia (1998–1999) ===
On his second return to Serbia Divljan recorded the soundtrack album for the movie Tri palme za dve bitange i ribicu ("Three Palms For Two Punks and a Chick"). With new techno oriented themes, the obscure Idoli track "Pomoć, pomoć" appeared in a new version recorded by Divljan and Ghuru Ghagi from the band URGH!. Ghagi with Šaban Bajramović also appeared on the cover version of "Tri palme na otoku sreće" ("Three Palms Trees on the Isle Of Happiness) sung by Divljan and Bilja Krstić. The soundtrack also featured "Dekada" ("Decade") by Apartchiks, "Mačo" ("Macho") by Presing and "Duboko disanje" ("Deep Breaths") by URGH!. Beside the Old Stars Band, the recording sessions featured guitarist Dušan Bezuha Duda (Banana, Zona B).

In July 1998 the Old Stars Band had a successful tour of Slovenia and Divljan appeared as guest on Buldožer concerts. During the same year Divljan with his companions entered the studio in Novi Sad to record his comeback album Sve laži sveta, the album was released in 2000. The album featured slower songs, a cover version of Buldožer's hit "Novo vreme" ("New Age"). The closing track "Rodina" was sung in Russian and used in an Australian documentary about a Russian astronaut. Guest appearances featured Kiril Džajkovski (synthesizer), Mladen Đorđević (trumpet), Laslo Dieneš (trumpet) and Andrej Maglovski (accordion). The CD also included a multimedia biographies of musicians, recordings of live performances and sections from the documentaries for which Divljan wrote the soundtrack.

=== Vienna years (1999–2015) ===
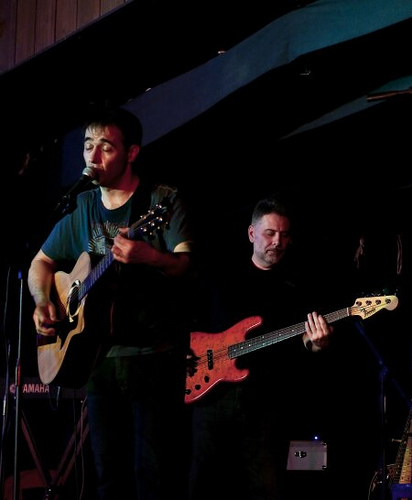
Vlada Divljan and Zdenko Kolar performing with Nevladina Organizacija in 2010

In the meantime Divljan met Dina, who would later become his wife. In January 1999 they had a son, Stevan. He was only two months old when the NATO bombing campaign in Serbia started. Since they did not want to bring up a child in war conditions, they decided to move to Vienna. The original idea was to stay for a short period of time, but eventually it turned out to be their permanent residence. In September 2002, Dina and Vlada had a second son, Pavle.

Shortly after moving to Vienna, Divljan started working on different sound design projects. He worked between 2001 and 2003 for a radio programme for people from the former Yugoslavia that was part of a project by ORF. In this period he started also a cooperation with SEEMO. Divljan was very active in Vienna supporting different human rights projects.

He also released an instrumental album Vlada Divljan presents Die Tonzentrale released in 2003 by B92 Records. The style of the album was a combination of jazz, blues, pop, rock and electronic music. He also participated on the Milan Mladenović tribute album Kao da je bilo nekad with the cover of "Radostan dan" ("Joyful Day"). He composed music for the theater piece Paviljoni ("Pavilions") by Zijah Sokolović. He appeared as guest on Kiril Džajkovski's soundtrack for Balcancan (released in 2005 by Lithium Records) on the track "Baba zumbula" which became a hit in the Republic of Macedonia. Divljan and Bunjac recorded a soundtrack for Sedam i po ("Seven and a Half") directed by Miroslav Momčilović.

In 2006 Divljan formed a new backing band called Nevladina Organizacija and did several live shows. He also started working on his new album with the work title Esperanto, featuring songs in Serbian, German and Esperanto. In a short interview he also stated that there are plans of making a web site about the album featuring the album itself, out-takes, instrumental tracks etc. However, the album has never seen the light of day.

In 2008 he recorded the soundtrack for the films Na lepom plavom Dunavu ("On The Beautiful Blue Danube"), Kosovski dnevnik by Željko Mirković and worked on the Miroslav Momčilović's movie Čekaj me, ja sigurno neću doći (Wait for Me and I Will Not Come).

In 2012, Divljan was diagnosed with an appendix cancer, which was operated on the following year. In January 2015 he was admitted to hospital with an inflammation of the peritoneum but he stated that everything was alright and that he felt "very well"; he even used the opportunity to announce a new single "Neposlušna građanka" ("Disobedient citizen") and a new live album. However, Divljan died in Vienna on 4 March 2015. His remains were cremated on the New Cemetery in Belgrade on 10 March.

== Discography ==
=== Solo works ===
Studio albums

- Tajni život A. P. Šandorova (PGP-RTB, 1988).
- Sve laži sveta (Automatik, 2000) – as Vlada Divljan Old Stars Band.
- Vlada Divljan presents Die Tonzentrale (B92 Records, 2003) – as Die Tonzentrale.

Live albums

- Odbrana i zaštita (B92 Records 1996) – as Vlada Divljan Old Stars Band.

=== Collaborations ===
Studio albums

- Rokenrol za decu (PGP RTB, 1989) – with Srđan Gojković Gile.
- Rokenrol bukvar (PGP-RTB, 1990) – with Srđan Gojković Gile.
- Lutka koja kaže ne (PGP-RTB 1991) – with Srđan Gojković Gile, Ivan Stančić Piko and Zoran Radomirović Švaba.
- Recorded Supplement (Avan Garde Records, 1997) – with Kiril Džajkovski (as Aparatchiks).

EPs

- Decade (1997) – with Kiril Džajkovski (as Aparatchiks).
- Četiri godišnja doba (2012) – with Ljetno Kino Big Band.

=== Guest appearances ===
Studio albums

- Tko mari za čari (Jugoton, 1987) – guitar on the track "Ne dozvoli" by Cacadou Look.
- Zaljubiška (PGP RTB, 1991) – writer of the track "Srećna Nova Godina" by Lepa Brena & Slatki Greh.
- Crni bombarder (ZAM, 1992) – guitar and backing vocals on Srđan Gojković Gile soundtrack album.
- Pirat (Round Records, 1999) – guitar on Zona B album.
- First & Last (Automatik Records, 2000) – vocals on Eva Braun version of "Hajde sanjaj me, sanjaj".
- Harmonajzer (PGP RTS, 2002) – guitar on the track "Zato stojim sam" by Električni Orgazam.
- Balcancan (Lithium Records, 2005) – vocals on Kiril Džajkovski's soundtrack album on the track "Baba zumbula".
- Autobus Calypso (Aquarius Records, 2007) – vocals on Cubismo version of "Devojko mala" entitled "Nina Bonita".

Live albums

- Rocking at the Party Live! (Suzy Records, 1989) – Guest on the Le Cinema live album on the track "Maršal".
- Koncert (Nika, 2005) – Guest on Vlada kreslin's live album on tracks "Malena" and "Dok dobuje kiša".

Various artists compilations

- Pop-Rok (Beogradsko Proleće '81) (PGP RTB, 1981) – as writer of Slađana Milošević & Ljudi track "Srećan ti rođendan".

=== Soundtracks ===
- Kako je propao rokenrol (Taped Pictures, 1989) – with Srđan Gojković Gile and Dušan Kojić Koja.
- Tri palme za dve bitange i ribicu (Favi, 1998).

=== Various Artists projects ===
- Malcziki (Single) – lead vocals on tribute version of "Malcziki" (yugo-wersja).
- Yugoton (BMG, 2001) – did backing vocals on tribute versions of Idoli songs.
- Kao da je bilo nekad... (posvećeno Milanu Mladenoviću) (Circle Records, 2002) – appears on Milan Mladenović tribute album with the song "Radostan dan".
