= Yugoslav new wave =

Music scene

The Yugoslav new wave (Serbian: Нови талас, Novi talas; Croatian: Novi val; Slovene: Novi val; Macedonian: Нов бран; Bosnian: Novi val) was the new wave music scene of the Socialist Federal Republic of Yugoslavia. As its counterparts, the British and the American new wave, from which the main influences came, the Yugoslav scene was also closely related to punk rock, ska, reggae, 2 tone, power pop and mod revival. Some of its acts are also counted as belonging to the Yugoslav punk scene which already existed prior to new wave. Such artists were labeled as both punk rock and new wave (the term "new wave" was initially interchangeable with "punk").

== Overview ==
The new wave scene in Yugoslavia emerged in the late 1970s and had a significant impact on the Yugoslav culture. The Yugoslav rock scene in general, including the freshly arrived new wave music, was socially accepted, well developed and covered in the media. New wave was especially advocated by the magazines Polet from Zagreb and Džuboks from Belgrade, as well as the TV show Rokenroler, which was famous for its artistic music videos.

This anti-establishment movement was even supported, although moderately, by the government, particularly by the communist youth organisation which often organized concerts, festivals, parties, exhibitions, and other cultural events. The lyrics that were criticizing and satirizing the flaws of Yugoslav socialism were considered by the authorities as a "useful and friendly critique" and were often tolerated with certain cases of censorship, particularly the Zagreb-based band Azra, who were known for their political and social criticism in their songs. The Yugoslav new wave scene also cooperated with various conceptual or artistic movements related to pop art, avant-garde etc.

Important artists of Yugoslav new wave were: Azra, Šarlo Akrobata, Idoli (famous for their song "Maljčiki" and its respective video in which they ridiculed Soviet soc-realism), Pankrti (first Yugoslav punk band), Prljavo kazalište (started as a punk unit; the title of their second album Crno-bijeli svijet, which means "the black and white world", holds a reference to the 2 tone movement), Električni Orgazam (punk at the beginning, they moved towards post-punk and psychedelia later and were described as "The Punk Doors"), Slađana Milošević, Haustor (mostly reggae, ska and similar influences, but with a more poetic and intellectual approach compared to some danceable bands), Buldožer, Laboratorija Zvuka, Film (one of the first Yugoslav new wave groups), Lačni Franz and many others. Some of them genuinely started as new wave bands, while others previously adhered to other styles (for example the members of Azra were previously into a somewhat hippie style prior to becoming a new wave band).

With the decreasing popularity of 1970s hard rock and progressive rock among the youths after the expansion of punk and new wave, even the cult rock band Bijelo Dugme decided to change its rural folk-ish hard rock style and jump onto the new wave bandwagon. They adopted the 2 tone style for a short period of time while it was fashionable on their album Doživjeti stotu which featured the ska theme "Ha, ha, ha". The chorus lyrics were used as a title for the compilation album Svi marš na ples!.

Cult symbols of the Yugoslav new wave era are the compilation albums Paket aranžman, Novi Punk Val, Artistička radna akcija and especially the movie The Promising Boy.

== Decline ==
As new wave perished in the late-1980s, some of the bands split or took different musical directions. The period around 1982 is considered especially crucial concerning the decline of new wave in Yugoslavia. There were several other reasons why Yugoslav new wave started to fade beside the notable general decline of new wave around the world: the economical crisis in Yugoslavia in the first half of the 1980s and the political instability, especially in the Socialist Autonomous Province of Kosovo in 1981 after Josip Broz Tito's death. Also, the musical genres such as post-punk, dark wave and gothic rock, as well as New Romantic and synth-pop already saw a great expansion around the world, including Yugoslavia too.

Šarlo Akrobata changed from its initial ska and reggae-inspired period, embracing a deeper post-punk sound. They were also a support act of Gang of Four in Zagreb, before they finally split in 1981. Milan Mladenović, the band's notable vocalist and guitarist in 1982 formed the cult band Ekatarina Velika which was noted for its dark poetic post-punk style and intellectual attitude. In the same year, his bandmate Dušan "Koja" Kojić formed the group Disciplin A Kitschme (Serbo-Croatian: Disciplina kičme), a band influenced by a variety of music styles, which later rose to international prominence.

Idoli, Prljavo kazalište and Film (the latter under the moniker Jura Stublić i Film) later became pop or pop rock and all of them respectively achieved great mainstream success. During the 1980s, Azra gradually moved to more conventional rock with occasional use of folk rock elements. Johnny Štulić's poetic trademarks were still notable throughout their lyrics; Električni Orgazam soon became a successful mainstream rock band inspired mostly by the 1960s including artists such as The Rolling Stones.

== Legacy ==
The Yugoslav new wave period is still considered the golden age of pop and rock music in the countries that emerged after the breakup of Yugoslavia. The Yugoslav new wave scene gave birth to some of the most important Yugoslav acts ever and it was acclaimed by the Western media (notably by Melody Maker) for its quality and originality as well.

In 2004, Igor Mirković made a film titled Sretno dijete (Happy Child) named after a song by Prljavo kazalište. The movie covers the events in the former Yugoslav new wave scene.

== Bands ==
- In SR Slovenia:
  - Avtomobili (Nova Gorica) – early period
  - Borghesia (Ljubljana)
  - Buldožer (Ljubljana)
  - Demolition Group (Brežice)
  - Gast'r'bajtr's
  - Lačni Franz (Maribor)
  - Pankrti (Ljubljana)
  - Otroci Socializma (Ljubljana)
- In SR Croatia:
  - Aerodrom (Zagreb) – on album Tango Bango only
  - Animatori (Zagreb)
  - Azra (Zagreb)
  - Boa (Zagreb)
  - Denis & Denis (Rijeka)
  - Film (Zagreb)
  - Haustor (Zagreb)
  - Metak (Split) – on album Ratatatatija only
  - Parlament (Zagreb)
  - Patrola (Zagreb)
  - Problemi (Pula)
  - Paraf (Rijeka)
  - Parni Valjak (Zagreb) – on album Vruće igre only
  - Prljavo Kazalište (Zagreb)
  - Stidljiva Ljubičica (Vrbovec)
  - Termiti (Rijeka)
  - Zvijezde (Zagreb)
  - Xenia (Rijeka) – early period
- In SR Serbia, including Vojvodina and Kosovo:
  - Bebi Dol
  - Bezobrazno Zeleno (Belgrade) – early period
  - Boye (Novi Sad) – early period
  - Bulevar (Belgrade)
  - Čista Proza (Novi Sad)
  - Defektno Efektni (Belgrade)
  - Dobri Isak (Niš)
  - Doktor Spira i Ljudska Bića (Belgrade)
  - Električni Orgazam (Belgrade)
  - Grupa I (Belgrade)
  - Gjurmët (Pristina)
  - Idoli (Belgrade)
  - Kontraritam (Novi Sad)
  - Kozmetika (Belgrade)
  - Laki Pingvini (Belgrade) – early period
  - La Strada (Novi Sad) – early period
  - Luna (Novi Sad)
  - Laboratorija Zvuka (Novi Sad)
  - Slađana Milošević (Belgrade)
  - Obojeni Program (Novi Sad) – early period
  - Pasta ZZ (Belgrade)
  - Pekinška Patka (Novi Sad)
  - Petar i Zli Vuci (Belgrade)
  - Piloti (Belgrade)
  - Profili Profili (Belgrade)
  - Propaganda (Belgrade)
  - Radnička Kontrola (Belgrade)
  - Slomljena Stakla (Belgrade) – early period
  - Šarlo Akrobata (Belgrade)
  - TV Moroni (Belgrade)
  - Urbana Gerila (Belgrade)
  - U Škripcu (Belgrade)
  - VIA Talas (Belgrade)
  - Zana (Belgrade)
- In SR Bosnia and Herzegovina:
  - Bijelo Dugme (Sarajevo) – on album Doživjeti stotu only
  - Kongres (Sarajevo)
  - Zabranjeno Pušenje (Sarajevo) – on album Das ist Walter only
  - Bonton Baya (Sarajevo)
- In SR Macedonia:
  - Cilinder (Skopje)
  - Mizar (Skopje) – early period
  - Badmingtons (Skopje)
  - Fol Jazik (Skopje)

== See also ==
- Popular music in the Socialist Federal Republic of Yugoslavia
- Punk rock in Yugoslavia
- Neue Slowenische Kunst
- Paket aranžman
- Artistička radna akcija
- Novi Punk Val
- Vrući dani i vrele noći
- New Primitivism
- Yugoton
- Bosnian rock
- Serbian rock
- Croatian popular music

=== Related movies ===
- Sretno dijete
- Davitelj protiv davitelja
- Dečko koji obećava
- Dezerteri Roka
