= Idoli =

Serbian new wave band

- Idoli; Photo: Goranka Matić

Background information
- Also known as: VIS Idoli
- Origin: Belgrade, SR Serbia, SFR Yugoslavia
- Genres: New wave, art punk, post-punk, experimental, pop rock
- Years active: 1980–1984
- Labels: Izgled, Jugoton, Croatia Records, City Records, PGP RTS
- Past members: Vlada Divljan; Nebojša Krstić; Srđan Šaper; Boža Jovanović; Kokan Popović; Zdenko Kolar; Branko Isaković; Goran Vejvoda

Idoli (Serbian Cyrillic: Идоли; trans. The Idols) were a Serbian new wave band from Belgrade. They are considered to be one of the most notable acts of the Yugoslav rock scene, and their 1982 album Odbrana i poslednji dani was on several occasions voted by the music critics as the greatest Yugoslav rock album.

== History ==
=== Background: Merlin and Zvuk Ulice ===
The roots of Idoli are found in a Belgrade-based band called Merlin (not to be confused with the Sarajevo-based pop rock band of the same name that would appear later and achieve Yugoslavia-wide popularity) and then jazz and pop rock band Zvuk Ulice consisting of Vlada Divljan on guitar and vocals, bassist Zdenko Kolar, keyboard player Dragan Mitrić, drummer Kokan Popović, Bora Antić on saxophone and Dragana Milković on piano and vocals.

Besides performing covers of various 1960s Anglo-American hits, Zvuk Ulice also wrote their own songs. In 1978, they performed at the BOOM Festival in Novi Sad and Gitarijada festival in Zaječar. Despite completing several recording sessions in a Radio Belgrade studio, none of the recorded material was ever released. Mitrić moved on to Bulevar and Popović joined Slađana Milošević's backing band.

=== VIS Dečaci and formation of the band ===
The first ideas of forming Idoli came up in 1979 when a youth magazine published photos of a band called Dečaci which were actually photos of the first Idoli lineup. The photos featured witty remarks like, for example on March 8, 1979, a photo signed "Dečaci emancipuju žene" ("The Boys emancipate women"). At the same time Belgrade walls were ornamented with graffiti announcing the formation of the band. "Margita je dečak" ("Margita is a boy", the first ever graffiti in Belgrade dedicated to Margita Stefanović who later became Katarina II keyboardist), "Dečaci ne plaču" ("Boys Don't Cry") or "Srđane budi čovek" ("Srđan, be a man") are only a few examples. Having created a media campaign and gained the public's attention, the band had to prove their existence and start playing.

VIS Idoli was officially formed on March 1, 1980, when the band had their first rehearsal. The first lineup consisted of primary school friends Vlada Divljan (guitar, vocals), Zdenko Kolar (bass), Boža Jovanović (drums) and Divljan's high school friends Srđan Šaper (percussion, vocals) and Nebojša Krstić (percussion). At that time the band collaborated with Dragan Papić who was a kind of media activist. The band manipulated the media very well. For example, they were to announce a change to the band's name on several occasions and the new names would be "Apoloni 5" (Appolos 5) or "Idoli plus bradonje" ("The Idols plus the bearded") because of Kolar and Jovanović's wearing beards.

In June 1980, the band made their first live appearance at Belgrade's SKC (Student's Cultural Center) with the leading Serbian new wave acts. After a month of existence, the band released their first single with a magazine called "Vidici" and it consisted of two tracks, "Pomoć, pomoć" ("Help, help") and "Retko te viđam sa devojkama" ("I Rarely See You With Girls"), a song with a gay-hint. Already parting ways with Papić, the band recorded another version of the track as a B-side of Maljčiki single, but this time in Zagreb with the producer Goran Bregović. At the 1980 Festival Omladina, which had been delayed from May to the autumn due to Tito's passing, new wave bands from Zagreb and Belgrade met for the first time. Idoli appeared with the track "Zašto su danas devojke ljute?" ("Why Are The Girls Angry Today?") and won one of the prizes.

Idoli, with Električni Orgazam and Šarlo Akrobata participated in the project called Paket aranžman with four tracks, "Schwüle Über Europa" (German for "Sultriness Over Europe", a parody on the attitude towards Germans) "Plastika" ("Plastic"), "Maljčiki" (Russian for "Boys", a parody on Social-Realist art and propaganda) and "Amerika" ("America"). The promotional video for "Maljčiki" was banned on national television and some radio stations after the Soviet embassy responded.

=== Commercial success ===
The band had its first independent concert on June 25 at the garden of Belgrade's SKC. The scalpers sold the tickets four times the original price. The opening acts were Bezobrazno Zeleno, VIA Talas, Marko Brecelj and Feo Volarić.

The next release was a self-titled EP or mini LP as it was called in former Yugoslavia, featuring six tracks including a cover version of Chuck Berry's "Come On" ("Hajde") and Darko Kraljić's "Devojko mala", with two different music videos. Film members Mladen Juričić (also known as Max Wilson) playing harmonica and Jurij Novoselić (also known as Kuzma Videosex) who played organ made guest appearances. The record was produced by another Film member, Ivan Stančić Piko. The cover of the album is the Red Nude by Amedeo Modigliani. Jugoton later re-released the EP with Film's live EP in Kulušić as a compilation album Zajedno. A tour with Film came in 1981 when they traveled in a boat and played in sea side resorts. In the summer of 1981, a new drummer became Kokan Popović who previously played with Divljan and Kolar in Merlin and Zvuk Ulice.

The band started recording their first album in autumn 1981 with Goran Vejvoda and Dušan Mihajlović Spira who ought to have been the assistant producer as they wanted to produce the record by themselves. After a short period Mihajlović left and the only assistance was Mile Miletić Pile. The recording of the album took more than four hundred hours which was a record in former Yugoslavia still to be broken. Guests on the album were Bebi Dol who did backing vocals on "Odbrana" ("Defence"), and Vuk Vujačić, Goran Grbić and Slobodan Grozdanović were a brass section on "Senke su drugačije" ("The Shadows Are Different"). Odbrana i poslednji dani came out in early 1982. It got the name from a Borislav Pekić book with the same title on which the whole album is based. It is a complex concept album dealing with an anthropological approach towards orthodoxy. The track "Poslednji dani" ("The Last Days") originally entitled "Maršal" ("Marshall"), dedicated to former Yugoslav president Josip Broz Tito, did not include the last verse due to the record company disapproval. A detail from a cloth on a Saint Nicholas icon was used as the cover and the font used on the record was a Cyrillic font similar to the one used in the Miroslav's Gospel. The band won the best album and the best cover award in 1982. In 1986 Yugoslav rock critics voted Odbrana i poslednji dani the best Yugoslav rock album of the 20th century.

In July 1982, Zdenko Kolar went to serve in the army and his replacement was Bulevar bassist Branko Isaković. The band started recording a new album in London with producer Bob Painter. Even though they changed their style to pop/rock, Čokolada went platinum and the title track became their greatest commercial hit. There was a slight scandal about the track being composed by Dušan Gerzić for the band Via Talas and Šaper presenting it as an Idoli track. However, Gerzić was credited co-author on "Bambina" which was released as a single. For this record Divljan wrote only "Radostan dan", "Vetar i zastave" and "Ja sam tu" (for which Divljan added a verse from Mišo Kovač track "Plakat će zora" written by Drago Britvić) because he was about to graduate mining and geology at the University of Belgrade. At the same time Šaper graduated from his studies in movie directing. Guest appearances on the album were reporter Vivien Goldman who was a guest vocalist and producer Bob Painter who played the keyboards. The original idea was to release a double EP called "U gradu bez sna", but Jugoton refused and released it as a long play album.

=== Breakup and post-breakup ===
After performing in Ljubljana, in March 1984, due to conflicts between the members, the band ceased to exist. The last Idoli release was a soundtrack for the movie Šest dana juna directed by Dinko Tucaković. Most of the soundtrack was written by Divljan, while other members took part in the recording process. Šaper did the vocals, Kolar and Isaković did the bass, Piko Stančić and Boban Đorđević did the drums, keyboards were recorded by Đorđe Petrović and Dragan Ilić and guitars by Katarina II member Dragomir Mihajlović "Gagi" and saxophone by Vuk Vujačić. Guest vocalists were Mišo Kovač on "Da je duži moj dan" ("If my day was longer") and folk singer Jahija Gračanlić (also known as the Cosmic Bosnian) on "Ja je zovem meni da se vrate" ("I Am Calling Her To Come Back") appearing instead of a Divljan's gay-themed folk song "Zaljubljen sam u svog jarana" ("I am in love with my buddy") that remains unreleased to this day.

Following the breakup, Krstić and Šaper wrote music for the singer Biljana Krstić, they also recorded an album called Poslednja mladost u Jugoslaviji with the band Unutrašnja Imperija (consisting of Dragomir Mihajlović "Gagi" (guitar), Branko Isaković (bass) and Dragoljub Đuričić (drums)). In 1995 the two recorded one more album this time forming a band Dobrovoljno Pevačko Društvo with Zoran Kiki Lesendrić from Piloti. The CD was called "Nedelja Na Duhove and was released through Eastfield Music. The album was recorded in Budapest and produced and arranged by Kiki Lesendrić. As studio musicians appeared Nenad Stefanović Japanac (bass and guitar), Milan Đurđević (keyboards), Istvan Alapi (guitar) and Zoltan Hetenyi (drums). Backing vocals were done by Aleksandra and Kristina Kovač.

After the album release, the two quit their musical careers. Šaper started a marketing business with his firm "Idols & Friends", worked as a creative director in "Saatchi & Saatchi" and "Ogilvy & Mather" and lately is the head of "McErricson". He acted and wrote the theme for "Davitelj protiv davitelja" and directed music videos and worked on TV and movie soundtracks. He is also active in politics and is head of the Serbian Democratic Party. Krstić became a physician, working at the island of Vis and then at the Hyatt Regency hotel in Belgrade. He also acted in the film Šest dana juna. After his medical career he took up marketing until he became president Boris Tadić's advisor. He is also a member of the Democratic Party.

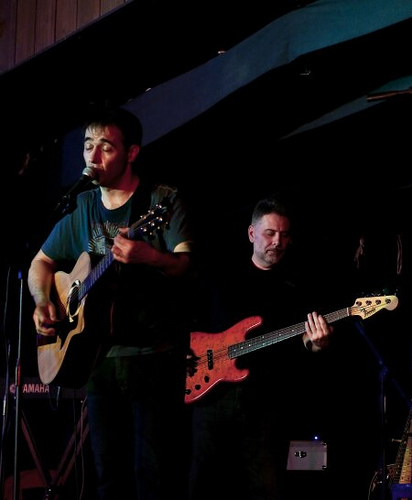
Vlada Divljan and Zdenko Kolar performing with Nevladina Organizacija in 2010

Divljan started a solo career in 1988 when he released his first solo album Tajni život A. P. Šandorova and with Srđan Gojković Gile from Električni Orgazam released two rock albums for children, Rokenrol za decu ("Rock 'n' Roll for Children) in 1989 and Rokenrol bukvar ("Rock 'n' Roll Alphabet") in 1990. In 1991 he moved to Australia only to return in 1995 when he formed the Old Stars Band. The recordings of two shows, on January 18 and 24 in M Studio in Novi Sad, was released on live album Odbrana i zaštita (B 92, 1996). In 1999 he moved to Vienna. His next two albums were released with Old Stars Band. In the meantime he collaborated with Kiril Džajkovski and worked on several movie soundtracks. At the moment he is recording a new solo album with the work title Esperanto, with a new backing band called Nevladina Organizacija. Divljan died in Vienna in 2015.

Zdenko Kolar worked as a driver of a trolley car and acted in TV commercials. He formed Zona B in 1987, the band recorded five albums featuring covers of blues classics and their own songs. He was a member of the Old Stars Band and currently works in Nevladina Organizacija beside Zona B.

Kokan Popović and Dragan Mitrić (who played keyboards in Zvuk Ulice, but was not a member of Idoli) were also in a band called Propaganda which released only one album in 1982, partially featuring material from the Zvuk Ulice period. Popović now lives in Johannesburg and in 2006 he presented to the Belgrade audience with his band Kokan and the Traitors which consists of Serbian musicians living in Johannesburg.

In 2007 Croatia Records released a four-CD box set VIS Idoli consisting of all studio works except the first Vidici single. The same record label released a box set consisting of Paket aranžman, Električni Orgazam and Šarlo Akrobata debut albums.

Vlada Divljan died in Vienna on March 5, 2015, after a long illness.

== Legacy ==
Idoli are one of the most influential and most covered Yugoslav and Serbian rock bands. Bands like Eva Braun, Ništa Ali Logopedi, Euforia, Kristali, and others recorded cover versions of their songs. Even rap/hip hop acts such as Gru and Wikluh Sky made versions of Idoli songs. Various artist project Yugoton consisting of Polish rock bands recorded a tribute to Yugoslav popular new wave bands including Idoli tracks "Maljčiki" (Pol. "Malcziki") and "Retko te viđam sa devojkama" (Pol. "Rzadko widuję cię z dziewczętami"). "Maljčiki" was released as a first single from the record.

In 1998, the album Odbrana i poslednji dani was polled as the greatest Yugoslav popular music album in the book YU 100: najbolji albumi jugoslovenske rok i pop muzike (YU 100: The Best albums of Yugoslav pop and rock music). In the same book Čokolada was ranked No. 46, and VIS Idoli was ranked No. 71. In 2015, Odbrana i poslednji dani was pronounced the greatest Yugoslav album in the special issue of Croatian edition of Rolling Stone. On the same list VIS Idoli was pronounced No. 20 and Paket aranžman was pronounced No. 38.

The Rock Express Top 100 Yugoslav Rock Songs of All Times list featured two songs by Idoli: "Maljčiki" (polled No. 32) and "Kenozoik" (polled No. 66). The B92 Top 100 Domestic Songs List features three idoli songs: "Maljčiki" (ranked No. 18), "Rusija" (ranked No. 25), and "Moja si" (ranked No. 52). In 2011, the song "Maljčiki" was polled, by the listeners of Radio 202, one of 60 greatest songs released by PGP-RTB/PGP-RTS during the sixty years of the label's existence.

The lyrics of 11 songs by the band were featured in Petar Janjatović's book Pesme bratstva, detinjstva & potomstva: Antologija ex YU rok poezije 1967 - 2007 (Songs of Brotherhood, Childhood & Offspring: Anthology of Ex YU Rock Poetry 1967 - 2007).

In 2016, an alley in Novi Sad was officially named Vlada Divljan Alley. Also in 2016, Cultural center "Palilula" in Belgrade was renamed to Cultural center "Vlada Divljan".

== Discography ==
- VIS Idoli (1981)
- Odbrana i poslednji dani (1982)
- Čokolada (1983)
- Šest dana juna (1985)
