= New Partisans =

1980s Yugoslav music movement

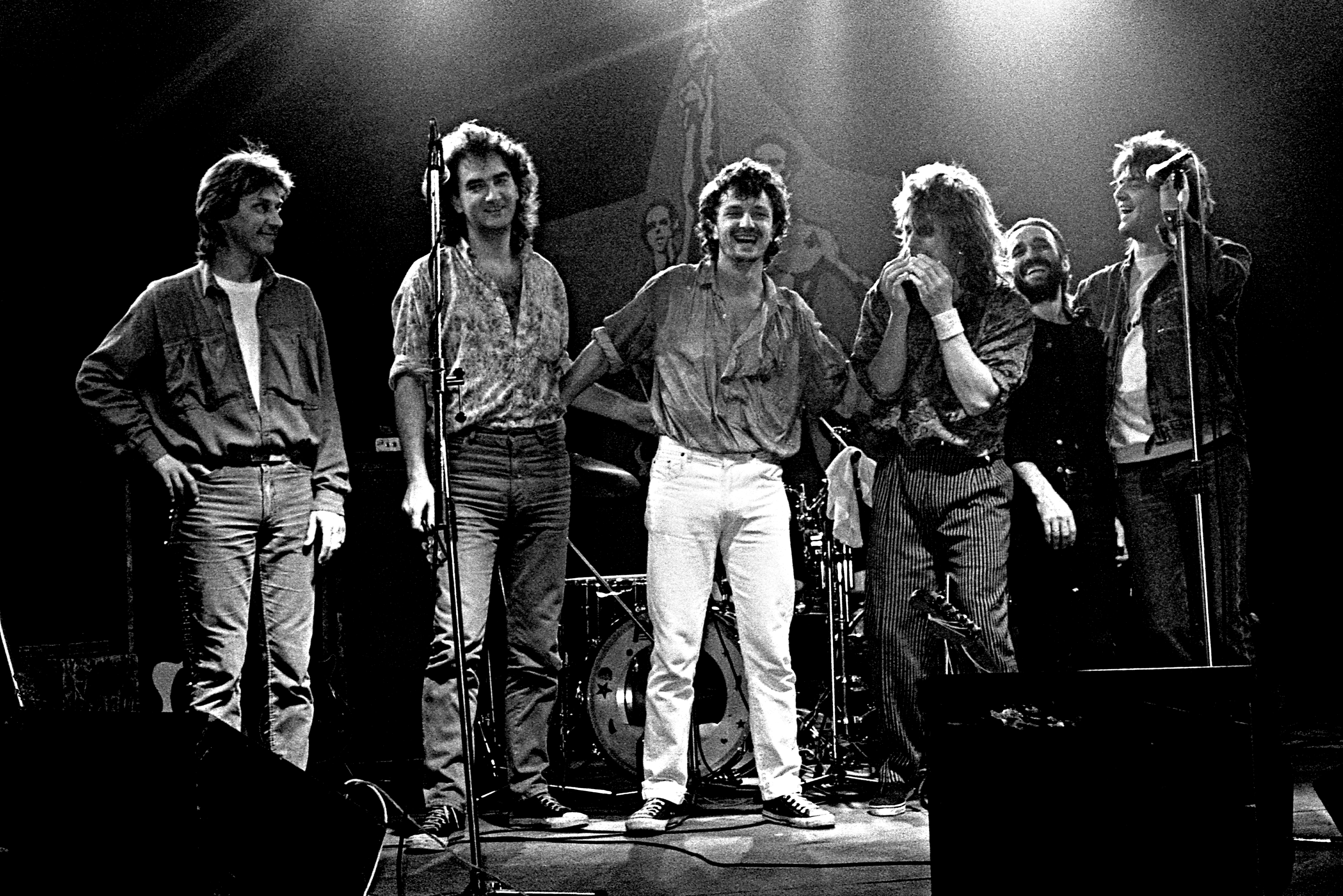
Bijelo Dugme, one of three representatives of the movement, in 1986, during the movement's peak

New Partisans was a short-lived mid-1980s movement on the Yugoslav rock scene. The term was used to denote albums by Sarajevo-based bands Bijelo Dugme, Plavi Orkestar and Merlin which were characterized by pop rock and power pop sound with elements of folk music and lyrics and imagery heavily inspired by Yugoslav Partisans movement and the ideal of brotherhood and unity.

Emerging several years after Sarajevo-based New Primitivism subcultural movement, New Partisans appeared during the era of growing liberalization in Yugoslavia's political, social and cultural life, as well as political turmoil and rise of nationalism in Yugoslav republics. The veteran band Bijelo Dugme, which had enjoyed the status of the most popular Yugoslav rock group since its formation in 1974, and two younger acts, Plavi Orkestar and Merlin, incorporated Partisan- and brotherhood-and-unity-themed lyrics into their blend of pop rock and folk, advocating for Yugoslavism and for preserving the memory of the National Liberation Struggle. Bijelo Dugme's 1984 self-titled album is generally considered the inspiration for the emergence of the movement. Additionally, some characteristics of the movement can be found on Plavi Orkestar's 1985 debut Soldatski bal, which launched the band to the status of nationwide teen stars, and the subsequent promotional tour. The 1986 albums by the three bands, Bijelo Dugme's Pljuni i zapjevaj moja Jugoslavijo, Plavi Orkestar's Smrt fašizmu! and Merlin's Teško meni sa tobom (a još teže bez tebe), are considered the most notable—and sometimes the only—releases of the movement, although similar folk-influenced pop rock songs with Yugoslavism-themed lyrics appeared on albums by other Yugoslav bands of the era, like Valentino, Hari Mata Hari, Crvena Jabuka and Jugosloveni.

The 1986 albums were met by mixed reactions of the public – while Bijelo Dugme's album saw large sales, Plavi Orkestar's album alienated the group from their teen fans. The country's music critics expressed general dislike of the albums, especially of Smrt fašizmu and Teško meni sa tobom (a još teže bez tebe). Part of music press and cultural public described the albums as kitsch and accused the bands of promoting bad taste, comparing the folk elements in the bands' works to Yugoslav "newly-composed folk music", which was at the time denounced in Yugoslavia by both the academic public and the pop culture media. The other part of the music press described the New Partisans concept as insincere, accusing the bands of exploiting the imagery of Partisan struggle for popularity and financial gain, and of hypocrisy, describing their leaders as comfortably-off stars which defended the declining socialist system. Following the negative reactions, the movement declined, although Bijelo Dugme's next (and last) studio album, the 1988 Ćiribiribela, was also marked by Yugoslavist and pacifist themes.

== History ==
=== Political, social and cultural background ===
The mid-1980s in Yugoslavia were marked by political turmoil. Death of Yugoslavia's president for life Josip Broz Tito in 1980 was followed by growing liberalization in arts and culture, but also by the growing problem of foreign debt, and by protests of Kosovo Albanians, which demanded more autonomy within the country. By the mid-1980s, the tensions between Yugoslav republics emerged, the first calls for abandoning socialist manifestations came from SR Slovenia, a large number of Serbs and Montenegrins emigrated from SAP Kosovo, and nationalism was on the rise.

However, despite the tensions in the country, the Yugoslav rock scene flourished as one of the richest and most vibrant rock scenes of Europe. Prior to the appearance of New Partisans, the 1980s Yugoslav rock had already seen several music scenes and subcultural movements with the prefix New. The Yugoslav new wave scene, closely associated with the Yugoslav punk rock scene, emerged in the late 1970s on the country's rock scene, up to that point dominated by progressive and hard rock bands. The new wave scene's peak in the early 1980s came in synchronicity with the death of Josip Broz Tito and new tendencies in art and culture. The bands like Pankrti, Paraf, Azra, Prljavo Kazalište, Pekinška Patka, Film, Haustor, Lačni Franz, Idoli, Električni Orgazam, Šarlo Akrobata, U Škripcu, Piloti and others recorded songs which were critical of the Yugoslav social reality, experimenting and conjoining with other art forms, with some veteran acts, like Bijelo Dugme, Parni Valjak and Buldožer, joining in on the new, exuberant scene. In Slovenia, the industrial band Laibach was formed in 1980, sparking controversy with their use of iconography and elements from totalitarianism, nationalism and militarism, which ultimately led to the ban of the group's name. In 1984, the band started the informal art collective Neue Slowenische Kunst (German for New Slovenian Art) with visual arts group IRWIN and Scipion Nasice Sisters Theatre, continuing to provoke the Yugoslav public. Finally, in Sarajevo, the New Primitivism movement emerged in the early 1980s, initially in the form of humorous sketches in Radio Sarajevo show Primus, and later through the work of the bands Zabranjeno Pušenje and Elvis J. Kurtović & His Meteors and their show Top lista nadrealista. Through their ironical songs and their Pythonesque TV show, the New Primitives ridiculed the staggering Yugoslav economy and Yugoslav social reality, the petty-bourgeois mentality, and their predecessors on the Yugoslav scene, including Yugoslav new wave bands and their city's and the country's biggest band, Bijelo Dugme.

In his 2013 book Kako smo propevali: Jugoslavija i njena muzika (How We Started to Sing: Yugoslavia and Its Music), Serbian and Yugoslav music journalist and author Ivan Ivačković dedicated a chapter to New Partisans movement entitled "Poslednje bitke Mirka i Slavko" ("The Last Battles of Mirko and Slavko"). In the chapter, Ivačković pointed out that the Yugoslavs born in the mid-1960s, like Plavi Orkestar leader Saša Lošić, got a notion of the Yugoslav Partisans struggle through popular 1960s and 1970s comic Mirko and Slavko and Partisan films. He wrote:

Lošić's generation was, from the early age, taken to cinema to see [Nazis'] German Shepherds biting wounded Partisans. Children would go out of the cinema shocked by violence and astonished by the courage of the Partisans. Commander Sava Kovačević was, for several years, the ultimate hero of a generation; by the way, when that generation hit puberty, Sava Kovačević had to give way to Bruce Lee, while Mirko and Slavko retreated with the advance of surrealist dark comedy comic Alan Ford. Full of drama and pathos, resembling Spaghetti Westerns, Partisan film spectacles like Battle of Neretva and Battle of Sutjeska represent milestones in the melancholic, intimate mythology of Lošić's generation, especially for the part of it which grew up in Bosnia and Herzgovina. World War II was especially brutal in Bosnia—just as the 1990s civil war would be—and out of that fact SFRY wanted to make not only historical, but cultural monument as well.

=== The beginnings (1984–1985) ===
In December 1984, Bijelo Dugme released their self-titled album, unofficially widely known as Kosovka devojka (Kosovo Maiden) due to the usage of the famous painting by Serbian painter Uroš Predić on the cover. It was the band's first and only album recorded with vocalist Mladen Vojičić "Tifa", who came to the band as the replacement for Bijelo Dugme's original vocalist Željko Bebek. The album featured folk-oriented pop rock sound and opened with the band's version of Yugoslav national anthem "Hej, Sloveni"; the idea came from Bijelo Dugme leader Goran Bregović, who was wary of the voices which questioned Yugoslavist ideals. Despite featuring new and up to that point relatively unknown vocalist, the album was a huge commercial success, selling more than 420,000 copies. The album was co-released by the state-owned label Diskoton and the newly-founded private label Kamarad, started by the band's leader Goran Bregović. The label's logo was influenced by socialist realism and featured a large red star. The followup tour was also highly successful, and during performances the band appeared on stage in stylized army uniforms partially inspired by the works of Laibach. The album is generally credited for starting a new wave of Yugoslavism on Yugoslav rock scene.

In 1985, Plavi Orkestar released their debut album Soldatski Bal (Soldiers' Ball). Led by vocalist and principal songwriter Saša Lošić, the band had been formed three years earlier, and was in their early phase associated with the New Primitivism movement. The group gained the attention of Yugoslavia's biggest record label Jugoton after starting to cooperate with music manager and promoter Goran Marić, alias Malkolm Muharem. Muharem—the alias alluding to fashion designer and music manager Malcolm McLaren—was previously involved in the New Primitives scene as the manager for Elvis J. Kurtović & His Meteors. The album featured numerous guests, including folk singer Nada Obrić in the folk-oriented tune "Šta će nama šoferima kuća" ("What Do We Drivers Need a House For"), as well as Aki Rahimovski and Jura Stublić, frontmans of Zagreb-based bands Parni Valjak and Film respectively, and Peđa D'Boy, frontman of Belgrade-based Peđa D'Boy Band, the three vocalists singing with Lošić in "Stambol, Pešta, Bečlija" ("Istanbul, Pest, Viennese"), the lyrics of which were inspired by the Yugoslav principle of brotherhood and unity. The album cover paid homage to the cover of Sgt. Pepper's Lonely Hearts Club Band, depicting the members of Plavi Orkestar in archaic uniforms, four girls in folk costumes, and 49 persons from Yugoslav history and public life. The band appeared on promotional photographs and in concerts wearing military boots and wool socks known as partizanke (Partisan socks), and the live performances on the promotional tour featured socialist and Yugoslavist imagery – the concerts opened with the sounds of "The Internationale", and the screens on stage displayed footage from the 1940s and 1950s work actions, followed by the closing kolo from Jakov Gotovac's opera Ero the Joker. Soldatski bal caused an immediate sensation on the Yugoslav scene with its radio friendly folk-influenced songs, the members of Plavi Orkestar soon becoming nationwide teen stars. Already in September 1985, Jugoton announced that the album sold 300,000 copies, becoming the best-selling debut album in the history of Yugoslav popular music, and placing Plavi Orkestar alongside other mega-selling acts of the Yugoslav rock scene like Bijelo Dugme, Riblja Čorba and Bajaga i Instruktori. However, among more alternative-oriented Yugoslav audience the album was met with negative reactions. The reactions of the Yugoslav music press were also mixed – part of music critics praised the album as innovative and exciting, while the other part described its blend of rock and "newly composed folk"—labeled by critic Rene Bakalović as "electro-sevdah"—as kitsch. The album also saw negative reactions in conservative cultural circles, which criticized the message of the album's biggest hit "Bolje biti pijan nego star" ("Better to Be Drunk than Old"), and the Yugoslav media initiated the discussion about the band. The League of Socialist Youth of Bosnia and Herzegovina demonstrated their stand on the band's work on the League's 11th congress by awarding the group with a plaque.

Merlin, formed in 1985 and led by vocalist Edin "Dino" Dervišhalidović, also released their debut album, entitled Kokuzna vremena (Broke Times), during the same year. The music critics described the band as a pale copy of Bijelo Dugme, however, the album sold 60,000 copies, much to surprise of the country's music journalists.

=== The peak (1986–1987) ===
In 1986, Bijelo Dugme released their new studio album Pljuni i zapjevaj moja Jugoslavijo (Spit and Sing, My Yugoslavia), recorded with new vocalist Alen Islamović. Goran Bregović originally wanted the album to contain contributions from individuals known for holding political views outside of the official League of Communists ideology. He and the band's manager Raka Marić approached three such individuals who were effectively proscribed from public discourse in Yugoslavia: pop singer Vice Vukov, who represented SFR Yugoslavia at the 1963 Eurovision Song Contest before seeing his career prospects marginalized after being branded a Croatian nationalist due to his association with the Croatian Spring political movement; painter and experimental filmmaker Mića Popović, associated with Yugoslav Black Wave film movement, who got a dissident reputation due to his paintings; politician and diplomat Koča Popović who, despite a prominent World War II engagement on the Partisan side as the First Proletarian Brigade commander that earned him the Order of the People's Hero medal, followed by high political and diplomatic appointments in the post-war period, nevertheless got silently removed from public life in 1972 after supporting a liberal faction within the Yugoslav Communist League's Serbian branch. Bregović's idea was to have Vukov sing the ballad "Ružica si bila, sada više nisi" ("You Were Once a Little Rose"). However, despite Vukov accepting, the plan never got implemented after the band's manager Marić got held and interrogated by the police at the Sarajevo Airport upon returning from Zagreb where he met Vukov. Mića Popović's contribution to the album was to be his Dve godine garancije (A Two-Year Warranty) painting featuring a pensioner sleeping on a park bench while using pages of Politika newspaper as blanket to warm himself, which Bregović wanted to use as the album cover. When approached, Mića Popović also accepted though warning Bregović of possible problems the musician would likely face. Koča Popović was reportedly somewhat receptive to the idea of participating on the album, but still turned the offer down. Eventually, under pressure from Diskoton, Bregović gave up on his original ideas. A World War II holder of the Order of the People's Hero still appeared on the record, however, instead of Koča Popović, it was Svetozar Vukmanović Tempo. He, together with Bregović and children from the Ljubica Ivezić orphanage in Sarajevo, sang a cover of "Padaj silo i nepravdo" ("Fall, (Oh) Force and Injustice"), an old revolutionary song. The album featured numerous references to Yugoslav unity, with the lyrics on the inner sleeve printed in both Cyrillic and Latin alphabets. However, instead of Popović's painting, the album cover featured a photograph of Chinese social realist ballet. Vukmanović's appearance on the album was described by The Guardian as "some sort of Bregović's coup d'état". Pljuni i zapjevaj moja Jugoslavijo was excellently received by the audience, bringing several hit songs. The final number of the album copies sold was 700,000, and on their promotional concert at Belgrade Fair the group performed in front of 25,000 people. In 1987, the band released the live album Mramor, kamen i željezo (Marble, Stone and Iron), recorded on the promotional tour. The album featured similar Yugoslavist iconography – the track "A milicija trenira strogoću" ("And Police Trains Strictness") begins with "The Internationale" melody, during the intro to "Svi marš na ples" ("Everybody Dance Now") Islamović shouts "Bratsvo! Jedinstvo!" ("Brotherhood! Unity!"), and the album cover features a photograph from the 5th Congress of the Communist Party of Yugoslavia.

In 1986, Plavi Orkestar released their second studio album, Smrt fašizmu! (Death to Fascism!). The concept of Smrt fašizmu! was conceived by the group's manager Malkolm Muharem, who found inspiration in the works of Neue Slowenische Kunst, and who described the new phase in Plavi Orkestar's work as "Bosnian art experiment". The December 1986 issue of Rock magazine brought a photograph of Lošić on the cover and an interview with him. In the interview, Lošić stated: "In those days of war, to say: I love you, comradette! How much power and emotional strength was in that sentence!" In a different interview, he stated: "I dedicate this album to Partisan love, the only love I consider pure. I heard a lot about this gentle, deep loyalty from [former] fighters I've met across the country. [...] This love is very much different from love made in today's urbanized, dolled up world, under the discotheque lights, where reality fades." Despite being ambitiously conceived—guest appearances included Italian singer Gazebo, violinist Jovan Kolundžija, folk singer Usnija Redžepova, klapa Šibenik, and choir of Zagreb's Saint Joseph's Church—and bringing several hit songs, the band's departure from the style of their debut caused a decline in popularity with their fans, and the album sales and promotional tour did not repeat the success of the previous release and follow up concerts.

Merlin turned to Partisan- and Yugoslavism-inspired lyrics and imagery with the album Teško meni sa tobom (a još teže bez tebe) (It's Hard With You (Even Harder Without You)). One side of the album cover featured the text Teško meni sa tobom... and an image of Marilyn Monroe, and the other side featured the text ...a još teže bez tebe and the image of Milja Marin, Partisan fighter which was a subject of Žorž Skrigin's famous World War II photograph named Kozarčanka (Woman from Kozara). The album featured guest appearances by Goran Bregović and Mladen Vojičić Tifa and a tribute to Bregović in the song "Uspavanka za Gorana B." ("Lullaby for Goran B.", in reference to Bijelo Dugme song "Uspavanka za Radmilu M."). The album featured folk-oriented songs and the Yugoslavism-inspired song "Cijela Juga jedna avlija" ("Whole Yugoslavia Is One Yard"). The growing popularity brought more attention of the media to the band. In the interview for November 1986 issue of Rock magazine, Dino Dervišhalidović stated: "I'm sad because in these times people believe more in lottery and sports betting than in any ideals", expressing his longing for "war and post-war morality" and stating that he feels sorry because "Partisan girls don't go through our street no more".

The influence of Bijelo Dugme's 1984 self-titled album can be seen in the works of other Sarajevo-based pop rock bands of the era, but also in the works of bands from other Yugoslav republics. Other 1980s pop rock bands from Sarajevo which occasionally incorporated folk elements into their songs include Valentino, Hari Mata Hari, Bolero, and Crvena Jabuka. The mid-1980s albums by some of these acts featured songs with lyrics inspired by brotherhood and unity, like Valentino's "Jugovići" ("Jugovićs", the title being a Yugoslav slang for Yugoslavs), Hari Mata Hari's "Naše malo misto" ("Our Little Town") and Crvena Jabuka's "Ako, ako" ("If, if") and "Jedina" ("Only One"), while Bolero included a cover of the old Husino rebellion song "Konjuh planinom" ("Across Konjuh Mountain") on their 1986 concept album O Jesenjinu (Of Yesenin). In addition, Belgrade-based band Jugosloveni performed similar folk-influenced pop rock, with their biggest hit being "Jugosloveni" ("Yugoslavs"), the song which described Yugoslav mentality in humorous way, and the second album by another Belgrade-based pop rock band, Alisa, was heavily influenced by the sound of Sarajevo bands. However, despite pop rock sound with folk elements and occasional brotherhood and unity-themed songs, Partisan struggle and Yugoslavism were never predominant in the bands' lyrics and imagery and these groups were not labeled as New Partisans.

Large part of the Yugoslav public, especially in the republics of Serbia, Bosnia and Herzgovina, Macedonia and Montenegro, feeling concerned with the future of the country, welcomed the Yugoslavist themes and iconography in rock music. However, the reactions of the Yugoslav music critics were generally negative, largely due to the bands' blend of rock and folk, compared by the music press to Yugoslav "newly-composed folk music", which was at the time denounced in Yugoslavia by the largest part of both the academic public and the pop culture media. At the time of the three albums release, the Yugoslav music press accepted the term "New Partisans" coined by Goran Bregović and used it to denote the new movement on the Yugoslav scene. Despite the commercial success of Bijelo Dugme's 1986 album, there were negative reviews coming from prominent critics. One of them was Belgrade rock journalist Dragan Kremer. In 1987, Kremer appeared as guest on TV Sarajevo's show Mit mjeseca (Myth of the Month), a programme pitting Yugoslav rock critics against the country's rock stars, allowing critics to directly pose questions to musicians sitting across from them in the same studio. In the case of Kremer's appearance, however, Bregović wasn't in the studio due to being on tour; Kremer's taped questions were thus shown to Bregović while his reaction was filmed. Expressing his opinion about the band's new direction, Kremer tore the album cover, which provoked Bregović to publicly insult Kremer, which became one of the larger media scandals of the time. The unrefined lyrics of new Plavi Orkestar songs like "Fa fa fašista nemoj biti ti (jerbo ću te ja, draga, ubiti)" ("Fa Fa Fascist, Don't You Be One (Because I'll Kill You, Darling)") and "Puteru, puteru" ("(Oh,) Butter, Butter") caused negative reactions coming from Yugoslav music press, but also from other Yugoslav rock artists. One of the negative reviews was written by renowned film director Emir Kusturica. In his review published in NIN magazine, Kusturica accused Lošić of promoting bad taste and attempting to turn rock music into state's project. Part of the music press accused Bregović and Lošić of hypocrisy, describing them as wealthy stars defending the socialist system out of selfish reasons. They were described by some Yugoslav journalists as "bourgeois rock revolutionaries" and "bureaucrats, hiding behind slogans calling for change, in order not to change themselves".

=== The decline (1988) ===
In 1988, the movement declined. Unsatisfied with low record sales of Smrt fašizmu! and half-empty halls on their promotional tour, Plavi Orkestar ended their cooperation with Malkolm Muharem, and decided to go on a discographic hiatus. With their 1989 comeback album Sunce na prozoru (Sunshine on the Window) they turned to sentimental pop rock, failing, however, to repeat the success of their debut. Dino Dervišhalidović also turned away from the movement's themes and imagery on his following releases, stating in 1988 that he "wanted to bring back some old, nice customs and ideals", but also stating that the "socialist way" brought him bad experiences and that he would "not waste time with politics again".

Of the three bands, only Bijelo Dugme continued to incorporate Yugoslavist messages into their work. At the end of 1988, the band released the album Ćiribiribela. The album was marked by Goran Bregović's pacifist efforts – the cover featured Edward Hicks' painting Noah's Ark, the song "Lijepa naša" ("Our Beautiful") featured the national anthem of Croatia "Lijepa naša domovino" ("Our Beautiful Homeland") combined with the Serbian traditional World War I song "Tamo daleko" ("There, Far Away"), and the title track featured lyrics about a love couple which decides to "stay at home and kiss" if the war starts. At the beginning of 1989, the band went on a tour. Despite well-attended concerts, on some of the group's performances in Croatia, the audience booed and threw various objects on stage when the band performed their pro-Yugoslav songs. After the concert in Modriča, held on 15 March, with four concerts left until the end of the tour, Alen Islamović checked into a hospital with kidney pains. This event revealed the existing conflicts inside the band, with Bregović claiming Islamović had no health issues during the tour. The tour was not continued, and Bregović went to Paris, leaving Bijelo Dugme's status open for speculations. As Yugoslav Wars broke out in 1991, it became clear that Bijelo Dugme would not continue their activity.

== Legacy ==
In 1998, Duško Antonić and Danilo Štrbac conducted a poll among 70 Serbian music critics, journalists, artists and other individuals whose work has been in some way related to Yugoslav rock scene, in order to create a list of 100 Greatest Albums of Yugoslav Popular Music. The results of the poll and the list were published in the book YU 100: najbolji albumi jugoslovenske rok i pop muzike (YU 100: the Greatest Yugoslav Rock and Pop Music Albums). The list features two albums from Bijelo Dugme's 1984–1988 period, Bijelo Dugme, polled No.28, and Pljuni i zapjevaj moja Jugoslavijo, polled No.53. In 2015, Croatian edition of Rolling Stone conducted a poll among Croatian music critics for 100 Greatest Yugoslav Albums, with Soldatski bal appearing on the 97th place on the list.

In 2000, Serbian music magazine Rock Express conducted a poll for 100 greatest Yugoslav rock songs among its readers, 120 music journalists and 100 musicians. The list, entitled Rock Express Top 100 Yugoslav Rock Songs of All Times and published in the magazine's 25th issue, features two songs from Bijelo Dugme's 1984 self-titled album, "Lipe cvatu, sve je isto ko i lani" ("Linden Trees Are in Bloom, Everything's just like It Used to Be"), polled No.10, and "Za Esmu" ("For Esma"), polled No.78., and one song from Plavi Orkestar's debut, "Bolje biti pijan nego star", polled No.75. In 2006, Serbian Radio B92 organized a poll among its listeners for the selection of top 100 Yugoslav songs. On their B92 Top 100 Domestic Songs list, Plavi Orkestar's song "Goodbye Teens" from Soldatski bal was ranked No.97.

In 2015, Serbian web magazine Balkanrock published a list of 100 Greatest Album Covers of Yugoslav Rock. On the list, Bijelo Dugme album cover was ranked No.1, Pljuni i zapjevaj moja Jugoslavijo cover was ranked No.3, Teško meni sa tobom (a još teže bez tebe) cover was ranked No.49 and Soldatski bal cover was ranked No.58.

In Kako smo propevali: Jugoslavija i njena muzika, Ivan Ivačković wrote about the movement:

New Partisans advocated Yugoslavism and tolerance, which seemed to be the solution for growing tensions in Yugoslav politics. Without Josip Broz Tito there wasn't an authority to keep the nations of Yugoslavia together, so their quarrelsome temperament became more and more apparent. The conflicts between the republics became harsher, the old, unhealed wounds from World War II were reopened, and togetherness, intellect and reason grew weaker by the day. Yugoslavia looked more and more unfixed, and New Partisans opposed that, which was, in principle, a good thing. The impression was, however, spoiled by the fact that New Partisans—just as the ones who were unbuilding Yugoslavia—promoted bad taste and vulgarity. But, as it usually goes, it was just what made the "Partisan offensive" unusually popular, and therefore strong.
