= SIM studio =

SIM Studio (also known as Studio Smolec) is a Croatian recording studio owned by Vladimir Smolec and Tomo in der Mühlen founded in the 1980s in Zagreb. Productions of SIM studio sold in tens of millions LPs of all the most influential Yugoslav artists. SIM studio produced and discovered many new artists, among them Plavi Orkestar. Smolec and in der Mühlen were constantly voted as two of the most influential people in the regional music industry by the music magazine Džuboks.

== Selected artists ==
- Ekatarina Velika
- Film
- Parni Valjak
- Pankrti
- Bijelo Dugme
- Oliver Mandić
- Zabranjeno Pušenje
- Haustor
- Plavi orkestar
- Boško Petrović
- Housepainters
- Jasmin Stavros
- Rajko Dujmić
- Karlowy Vary

== Albums recorded ==
Year	Artist	Album	Producer
1985	Film	Signali u noći	Film
1985	Plavi Orkestar	Soldatski bal	Husein "Hus" Hasanefendić
1985	Ekatarina Velika	Ekatarina Velika	Vladimir Smolec
1985	Oliver Mandić	Dođe mi da vrisnem tvoje ime ^{1}	Peter MacTaggart
1985	Zabranjeno Pušenje	Dok čekaš sabah sa šejtanom	Mahmud "Paša" Ferović
1985	Parni Valjak	Pokreni se!	Parni Valjak
1985	Haustor	Bolero	Dragan "Čač" Čačinović
1985	SexA	Tidamja 85.	SexA
1986	Lačni Franz	Na svoji strani	Lačni Franz
1986	Aerodrom	Trojica u mraku	Jurica Pađen
1986	Various artists	Nešto se dešava	
1986	New York	Divlje dete	New York
1986	Ekatarina Velika	S' vetrom uz lice	Dragan "Čač" Čačinović
1986	Kaliopi	Kaliopi	Zlatko Tanodi
1986	Limeni Bubanj	Limeni bubanj	Dragan "Čač" Čačinović / Rastko Milošev
1986	Senad od Bosne	Tri godine samoće	Senad Galijašević
1986	Boris Novković	Kuda idu izgubljene djevojke	Senad Galijašević
1986	Daze Road	Ljepote sna	Vedran Božić
1986	Plavi Orkestar	Smrt fašizmu	Saša Lošić
1987	Pankrti	Sexpok	Tomo in der Mühlen
1987	Jasmin Stavros	Priče iz kavane	Stevo "Mileni" Cvikić
1987	Zdravko Škender	Ljubavi se po pjesmama pamte	Đelo Jusić / Đorđe Novković
1987	Alen Slavica	Šarene oči	Senad Galijašević
1987	Josipa Lisac	Boginja^{2}	Krešimir Klemenčić
1988	Zdravko Škender	Suze ljubavi	Ivo Lesić
1988	Doris Dragović	Pjevaj srce moje	Rajko Dujmić
1988	Jasmin Stavros	Evo mene opet	Rajko Dujmić
1988	Milo Hrnić	Ja neću takav život	Ivo Lesić / Mato Došen / Đelo Jusić
1988	Forum	International Dance Party^{3}	Aleks Perković / Ivan Ivić
1988	Ruž	Još jedan ples	Ivan "Firči" Fece
1988	Bijelo Dugme	Ćiribiribela ^{5}	Goran Bregović
1988	Goran Bregović	Dom za vešanje soundtrack ^{6}	Goran Bregović
1990	Vesna Gorše, Dražen Franolić, and Jurica Ugrinović	Wonderland^{4}	Berislav Lopac / Dražen Franolić / Jurica Ugrinović / Vesna Gorše
