= Plavi Orkestar =

Bosnian pop rock band

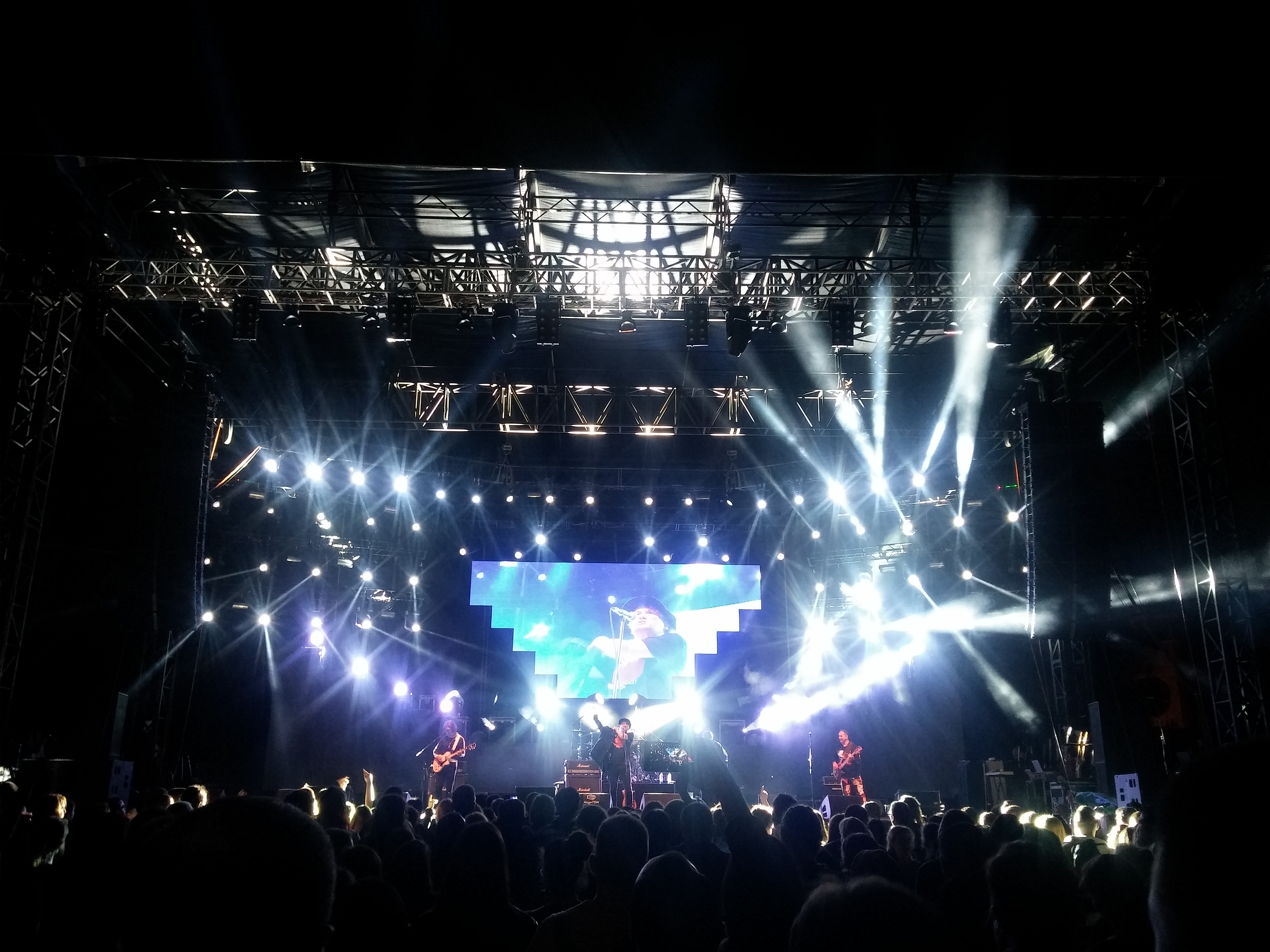
- Plavi Orkestar performing at Arsenal Fest in Kragujevac in 2018

Background information
- Origin: Sarajevo, SR Bosnia and Herzegovina, SFR Yugoslavia
- Genres: Pop rock; power pop; folk rock
- Years active: 1983–1992; 1997–present
- Labels: Jugoton, Diskoton, Croatia Records, Nika, Pop Records, Dallas Records
- Members: Saša Lošić; Admir Ćeremida; Samir Ćeremida; Robert Pikl
- Past members: Srđan Krošnjar; Gordan Džamonja; Mladen Pavičić; Saša Zalepugin
- Website: www.plaviorkestar.net

Plavi Orkestar (lit. 'Blue Orchestra') is a pop rock band originally formed in Sarajevo, SR Bosnia and Herzegovina, SFR Yugoslavia in 1983, and since 1998 based in Slovenia. Plavi Orkestar was one of the most popular acts of the 1980s Yugoslav rock scene and one of the best-selling acts of the Yugoslav popular music scene in general.

The band was started in 1982 by four teenagers – vocalist Saša Lošić "Loša", guitarist Srđan Krošnjar, bass guitarist Gordan Džamonja and drummer Admir Ćeremida "Ćera II". In 1983, the four were joined by experienced guitarist Mladen Pavičić "Pava". The band got a steady lineup in late 1983, with the departure of Krošnjar and Džamonja and the arrival of Admir Ćeremida's twin brother, bass guitarist Samir Ćeremida "Ćera I". In the early stage of their career, Plavi Orkestar were associated with the New Primitivism subcultural movement, but turned towards more commercial folk-influenced pop rock sound with their debut Soldatski bal. The album, released in 1985, became one of the best-selling records in the history of Yugoslav popular music and the band members rose to the status of teen stars, despite mixed reactions coming from the Yugoslav music critics. On their following album, Smrt fašizmu!, the band, influenced by their manager and promoter Malkolm Muharem, presented themselves with the concept named New Partisans, featuring lyrics and imagery inspired by Yugoslav Partisans and Yugoslavism. The album was generally disliked by the critics and alienated the band from a large part of their teenage fans, the members deciding to make a discographic hiatus after its release. With the album Sunce na prozoru, released in 1989, the band turned to sentimental pop rock sound. Despite not repeating the nationwide success of the group's first album, Sunce na prozoru and Simpatija, released in 1991, brought a number of hits. The outbreak of the Bosnian War forced the band members to end their activity in 1992. In 1998, Lošić and Ćeremida brothers reunited in Slovenia with new guitarist Saša Zalepugin, making a highly successful comeback with the album Longplay. The band had released two studio albums since, maintaining large popularity in all former Yugoslav republics. In 2025, the default lineup, featuring Lošić, Pavičić and Ćeremida brothers, reunited for the first time since 1992.

== History ==
=== The beginnings, formation of the steady lineup (1981–1983) ===
In 1981, sixteen-year-old Saša Lošić "Loša", a gymnasium student from Sarajevo, started a band called Ševin Orkestar (The Lark's Orchestra). The band also featured guitarist Srđan Krošnjar, bass guitarist Gordan Džamonja and drummer Admir Ćeremida. The following year, the four teenagers changed their name to Plavi Orkestar. Simultaneously, Lošić switched high schools—transferring from the Third Sarajevo Gymnasium to First Sarajevo Gymnasium, where he would meet and befriend guitarist Mladen "Pava" Pavičić.

Pavičić had already experienced a certain measure of musical prominence locally, having played in a band called Rock Apoteka (Rock Pharmacy) with fellow teenagers Bojan Hadžihalilović (later would become prominent graphic designer) on vocals and Rusmir "Šanko" Mesihović (son of prominent politician Munir Mesihović) on the second guitar; the peak of their run was appearing as one of the opening acts at Bijelo Dugme's Rock spektakl '79 open-air event at JNA Stadium in Belgrade in September 1979. With the emergence of new trends on the early 1980s Yugoslav rock scene, Rock Apoteka embraced ska, changing their name to Super 98 and managing to get in among the acts competing at the 1981 Omladinski festival in Subotica though failing to qualify for the finals. After Super 98's performance at the festival, Pavičić moved to pop band Mali Princ (Little Prince), and eventually, during early 1982, ended up with the 1980 Zaječar Gitarijada festival winners Pauk (Spider), with whom he soon recorded an album, Mumije lažu, released in 1983. Since Pauk was based out of Zavidovići, for teenage Pavičić, that meant traveling 130 km from Sarajevo every weekend for band rehearsals, which his parents did not approve of and soon persuaded him to stop. For a short time afterwards, alongside Admir Ćeremida's twin brother Samir, he played with Elvis J. Kurtović & His Meteors, and then in the bands Bonton Baja and Kazablanka (Casablanca).

Throughout this 1982-1983 period, Pavičić and Lošić frequently hung out and jammed, even writing a song together, "Suada". It was in 1983, at a Siluete concert in Sarajevo, that the two agreed about Pavičić joining Lošić's band. Having much more musical experience than Lošić, Pavičić managed to persuade Lošić to kick Krošnjar and Džamonja out of the band, seeing them as not committed and dedicated enough. The steady lineup was formed in late 1983, with the arrival of bassist Samir Ćeremida whose most recent musical activity had been a brief spring 1983 stint with Zabranjeno Pušenje. Due to his twin brother Admir already being in Plavi Orkestar, he was easily persuaded by Lošić and Pavičić to join the band.

=== Rise to prominence (1983–1984) ===
The new lineup of the band started opening for popular Yugoslav acts like Riblja Čorba and Leb i Sol, which got the young band their first exposure in the country's music press. However, the reviews and notices were atrocious, and disappointed Lošić considered leaving the band. Still, the enthusiasm from the rest of the band brought him back into the fold, and the band continued with live performances. Lošić focused on writing new songs, most of which were inspired by unrequited love for a Sarajvo girl. During summer of 1983, they held a gig at a Sarajevo club Trasa, where they were spotted by Laboratorija Zvuka's Mladen Vranešević, who, noticing their potential, invited them to Belgrade to record material for a studio album. In Enco Lesić's studio, they recorded the songs "Soldatski bal" ("Soldier's Ball"), "Goodbye Teens" and "Suada", intending to release them on a maxi single. However, soon all four were drafted to serve their mandatory stints in the Yugoslav People's Army, and the plans for their debut release had to be postponed. In September 1983, as a send-off of sorts, Plavi Orkestar played a show at Skenderija with the bands Bonton Baja and Kongres. Over the following weeks, the four band members left for their respective army stints and band activity was put on hiatus.

Lošić and Pavičić returned home first, in September 1984, continuing where they had left off one year earlier while waiting for their rhythm section to come back home as well. The two performed occasionally with various musicians, but due to poor gig quality, they got into a row that ended up with Pavičić quitting the band. However, the song "Goodbye Teens" was released on Diskoton's 1984 compilation album Nove nade, nove snage (New Hopes, New Forces), featuring songs by young non-established bands, and Lošić got in touch with manager Goran Marić. Marić was previously the bass guitarist for the band Opera Iu, recording a 7-inch single with the group, before getting involved in the Sarajevo New Primitivism movement under the alias Malkolm Muharem (which alluded to fashion designer and music manager Malcolm McLaren), managing Elvis J. Kurtović & His Meteors. In Zagreb, Lošić and Marić, with the help from Parni Valjak members Husein Hasanefendić "Hus" and Rastko Milošev and Ekatarina Velika drummer Ivan Fece "Firchie", recorded the demos for the songs which would appear on Plavi Orkestar's debut album. Although Plavi Orkestar was inactive at the time, the demos got Yugoslavia's biggest record label Jugoton interested in the group, and Lošić signed a pre-contract with the company. Lošić showed the document to Pavičić and managed to persuade him to return to the group.

=== Debut album release and nationwide popularity (1985–1986) ===
With the Ćeremida brothers back from the army, the band started recording their debut album Soldatski bal (Soldier's Ball) at the beginning of 1985. The album was produced by Husein Hasanefendić "Hus" and featured a number of guest appearances: Parni Valjak frontman Aki Rahimovski, Film frontman Jura Stublić and Peđa D'Boy recorded vocals for the song "Stambol, Pešta, Bečlija" ("Istanbul, Pest, Viennese"), folk singer Nada Obrić recorded vocals for the song "Šta će nama šoferima kuća" ("What Do We Drivers Need a House For"), and theatrologist Jovan Ćirilov and painter Dragoš Kalajić recorded backing vocals for the ballad "Bolje biti pijan nego star" ("Better to Be Drunk than Old"). Ivan Fece "Firchie" played drums on several tracks and recorded backing vocals, and backing vocals were also recorded by Denis & Denis frontess Marina Perazić and Hamdija Demirović. The album cover, designed by Bojan Hadžihalilović of Trio studio, paid homage to the cover of Sgt. Pepper's Lonely Hearts Club Band, depicting the members of Plavi Orkestar in archaic uniforms, four girls in folk costumes, and 49 persons from Yugoslav history and public life, including the Seven Secretaries of SKOJ, Ivo Lola Ribar, Vuk Karadžić, Petar II Petrović-Njegoš, Miroslav Krleža, Vladimir Nazor, Zuko Džumhur, Bata Živojinović, Bekim Fehmiu, Olivera Katarina, Slavko Štimac, Ivo Robić, Goran Bregović, Željko Bebek, Oliver Mandić, Lepa Brena, Mirza Delibašić and others. Some of Plavi Orkestar's contemporaries did not give approval for the usage of their photographs, and were represented on the cover with their silhouettes only.

Soldatski bal was released in the spring of 1985, causing an immediate sensation on the Yugoslav scene with its radio-friendly folk-influenced songs, with occasional remnants of the band's New Primitivism roots. The members of Plavi Orkestar soon became nationwide teen stars. Already in September 1985, Jugoton announced that the album sold 300,000 copies, becoming the best-selling debut album in the history of Yugoslav popular music and placing Plavi Orkestar alongside other mega-selling acts of the Yugoslav rock scene like Bijelo Dugme, Riblja Čorba and Bajaga i Instruktori. The promotional performances were marked by the band's carefully molded image – in public Lošić always wore his cap, and the members wore sneakers with untied shoelaces, with—as they later explained—the goal of provoking unconscious protective urges with their female fans. The promotional video for the song "Kad mi kažeš paša" ("When You Call Me Pasha"), directed by Goran Gajić, featured actresses Sonja Savić, Tanja Bošković and Mirjana Bobič, and singer and TV presenter Suzana Mančić. The band also used socialist and Yugoslavist iconography, with Soldatski bal cover featuring the red star and the band appearing on promotional photographs and live performances wearing military boots and wool socks known as partizanke (partisan socks). The concerts on the promotional tour opened with the sounds of "The Internationale", and the screens displayed footage from the 1940s and 1950s work actions, followed by the closing kolo from Jakov Gotovac's opera Ero the Joker.

On 15 June 1985, Plavi Orkestar, alongside 23 other acts, performed at the Red Star Stadium in Belgrade, on the concert which was a part of YU Rock Misija, a Yugoslav contribution to Live Aid. After the performance, the band continued their debut album promotional tour, entitled "Bolje biti pijan nego star" after the album's biggest hit. The concerts were sold out, including a concert in Belgrade's Tašmajdan Stadium, held on 14 September and featuring guest appearance by Nada Obrić. That evening, Plavi Orkestar performed in front of 11,000 spectators. Several days after the Belgrade concert, Plavi Orkestar performed at the alternative festival Novi Rock (New Rock) in Ljubljana, the performance being followed by several incidents. Prior to the performance, during the band's appearance on Ljubljana's Radio Študent, a number of listeners called in to state that they will not allow Plavi Orkestar "to do in SR Slovenia what they did in other Yugoslav republics with their music" and threatened to throw stones at the band if they appear on the festival. The band performed in tense atmosphere in front of 6,000 people, but there were no larger incidents, with the exception of a small group of spectators throwing various object towards the stage and waving the banner "Bolje biti živ nego mrtav" ("Better to Be Alive than Dead").

Soldatski bal caused mixed reactions not only among Yugoslav rock audience, but also among the country's music critics. Part of the music press praised the album as innovative and exciting, while the other part described its blend of rock and "newly composed folk"—described by critic Rene Bakalović as "electro-sevdah"—as kitsch. The album also saw negative reaction by the country's cultural circles, which criticized the message of the song "Bolje biti pijan nego star", and the Yugoslav media initiated the discussion about the band. The League of Socialist Youth of Bosnia and Herzegovina demonstrated their stand on the band's work on the League's 11th congress by awarding the group with a plaque. In May 1986, the band performed in Sweden, and in the summer they performed on the Festival of Mediterranean Countries in Annaba, Algeria, holding three concerts in the city: in the city stadium, on the main square and on the closing evening of the festival. Following the performances, Soldatski bal was released on audio cassette for the Algerian market.

=== Smrt fašizmu!, New Partisans and hiatus (1986–1987) ===
In 1986, Plavi Orkestar released their second album, Smrt fašizmu! (Death to Fascism!). Initially, the band negotiated with singer and songwriter Oliver Mandić to produce the album, but they did not reach an agreement, so the album ended up being produced by Lošić and Pavičić. The album featured guest appearance by Italian singer Gazebo in the song "To je šok" ("It's a Shock"), for which he also wrote English language lyrics. Other guests included composer and musician Alfi Kabiljo, violinist Jovan Kolundžija, folk singer Usnija Redžepova, sister singers Izolda and Eleonora Barudžija, drummer Điđi Jankelić (on percussion), klapa Šibenik, members of Culture and Arts Society Linđo from Dubrovnik, and choir of Zagreb's Saint Joseph's Church. Pianist Ivo Pogorelić and Bajaga i Instruktori frontman Momčilo Bajagić "Bajaga" were also invited to make guest appearances, but both declined the invitation. The album was, as its predecessor, inspired by Yugoslavism, becoming one of the most prominent releases of the short-lived New Partisans movement. The term New Partisans was coined by Bijelo Dugme leader Goran Bregović and was at the time used to describe 1986 albums by Bijelo Dugme, Plavi Orkestar and Merlin. The concept of Smrt fašizmu! was conceived by the group's manager Malkolm Muharem, who found inspiration in the Neue Slowenische Kunst movement, and described the new phase in Plavi Orkestar's work as "Bosnian art experiment". In December 1986 interview for Rock magazine, Lošić stated: "I dedicate this album to Partisan love, the only love I consider pure. I heard a lot about this gentle, deep loyalty from [former] fighters I've met across the country. [...] This love is very much different from love made in today's urbanized, dolled up world, under the discotheque lights, where reality fades." The band participated on the 1986 Zagreb Festival evening of patriotic songs with the song "U Jevrema slika ta" ("There's a Photo at Jevrem's").

The unrefined lyrics in the album songs like "Fa fa fašista nemoj biti ti (jerbo ću te ja, draga, ubiti)" ("Fa Fa Fascist, Don't You Be One (Because I'll Kill You, Darling)") and "Puteru, puteru" ("(Oh,) Butter, Butter") caused negative reactions coming from Yugoslav music critics, but also from other Yugoslav rock artists. One of the negative reviews was written by renowned film director Emir Kusturica. In his review published in NIN magazine, Kusturica accused Lošić of promoting bad taste and attempting to turn rock music into state's project. Part of the press described the New Partisans concept as "quasi-revolutionary", accusing Bregović, Lošić and Merlin leader Edin "Dino" Dervišhalidović of exploiting the imagery of National Liberation Struggle for popularity and financial gain.

The band's departure from the style of their debut also caused a decline in their popularity with their fans, with only the songs "Sava tiho teče" ("Sava Flows Quietly"), "Zelene su bile oči te" ("Those Eyes Were Green") and "Kad si sam druže moj" ("When You Are Alone, My Friend") seeing some success with the Yugoslav teen audience. The promotional tour also did not repeat the success of the previous one. In March 1987, the band held a promotional concert in a half-empty hall of Belgrade Fair. After their Belgrade concert, they held seven fund-raising concerts for the victims of the 1986 earthquake in Bosansko Grahovo and Knin. The band had more success with concerts in their home republic of Bosnia and Herzegovina. After the end of their second Yugoslav tour, the group ended their cooperation with Malkolm Muharem and decided to make a discographic break in their work.

During 1988, the band performed abroad. They held a tour across the Soviet Union, during which they held eight concerts in Moscow and eight concerts in Volgograd. During their staying in the Soviet Union, they also appeared in Alla Pugacheva's TV show directed by Nikita Mikhalkov. They played on a festival in Çeşme, Turkey, performing as the opening act for Chaka Khan, and on the Sopot International Song Festival in Poland.

=== Comeback and disbandment (1989–1992) ===
In 1989, Plavi Orkestar released the album Sunce na prozoru (Sun in the Window), which would be their last album released through Jugoton record label. The album was produced by Lošić with the help of Krešimir Klemenčić, and featured the sound resembling the band's first album. It featured guest appearances by guitarists Marijan Brkić (of Parni Valjak and formerly of Prljavo Kazalište) and Duško Mandić (formerly of Srebrna Krila). The album's biggest hit was the ballad "Kaja". The song "Daj nam sunca" ("Give Us Sunshine") was a cover of "Let the Sunshine In" with Serbo-Croatian lyrics originally written for the 1960s Yugoslav production of Hair performed in Atelje 212 theatre. The song "Sex, keks i rock 'n' roll" ("Sex, Biscuits and Rock 'n' Roll") was musically based on the children's song "If You're Happy and You Know It" and featured dialogues from the film Who's Singin' Over There?. The album release was followed by a Yugoslav tour, but once again the band failed to repeat the success of their 1985 tour.

In 1991, the band released the album Simpatija (Crush), through Diskoton record label. All the songs were authored by Lošić, with the exception of "Beštija" ("Beast"), composed by Marijan Brkić. Brkić also co-produced the album with band members and played keyboards on the album recording. Saxophonist Miroslav Sedak Benčić also appeared as guest on the album. Once again the album cover was designed by Trio studio, featuring Willem Johannes Martens' painting Loves Dream. The album featured a cover of The Mamas & the Papas song California Dreamin', titled "Ljubi se istok i zapad" ("May East and West Kiss"), the title coming from an old revolutionary song. The cover, which became a large hit for the band, was originally intended by Lošić as an advertisement for a tourism agency. The song "Sačuvaj zadnji ples za mene" ("Save the Last Dance for Me") was titled after the song by The Drifters, but was musically based on the song "Rhythm of the Rain" by The Cascades.

The band started their last Yugoslav tour in August 1991, at the time when first armed conflicts in Yugoslavia had already begun. The band intended to hold 120 concerts across Yugoslavia, but their concerts in war-affected Slovenia and Croatia had to be cancelled, and the band managed to hold planned concerts only in Serbia, Macedonia and Bosnia and Herzegovina. In early 1992, they performed on peace concerts in Sarajevo, Konjic, Mostar, Banja Luka and Trebinje. With the beginning of Bosnian War, Plavi Orkestar ended their activity.

=== Post breakup (1992–1998) ===
The war forced Lošić, Pavičić and Admir Ćeremida to emigrate out of Bosnia and Herzegovina. Lošić emigrated to Slovenia, where he started a career in design and marketing. He continued to compose, writing several songs for Crvena Jabuka, another popular pop rock band whose members emigrated from Sarajevo with the beginning of Bosnian War, reforming the group in Croatia. The songs were released on Crvena Jabuka's 1995 album U tvojim očima (In Your Eyes), and Lošić joined the group on their promotional tour as guest. Lošić also wrote songs for Croatian pop singer Severina and for the 1996 album Zaboravi (Forget) by actor and singer Rade Šerbedžija. He wrote several songs for the 1998 album Ko vse utihne (When Everything Goes Quiet) by Slovenian actress and singer Tanja Ribič, including the song "Zbudi se" ("Wake Up"), with which Ribič represented Slovenia at the 1997 Eurovision Song Contest. He wrote music for a number of films and theater plays. He had large commercial success with his soundtrack for Pjer Žalica's film Fuse. The soundtrack was released on the album Gori vatra (the film's original title), which, among other tracks, featured a cover of "Suada" performed by folk singer Šerif Konjević.

With the outbreak of the war, Pavičić emigrated to Belgrade. For a period of time, he performed with Belgrade faction of another Sarajevo band, Zabranjeno Pušenje, before moving to Canada, where he started a career as studio musician.

Admir Ćeremida emigrated to Paris, where he formed the band Overdream with former members of less known Sarajevo bands. They released their self-titled album in 1996, and also took part in the recording of the album Fildžan viška (A Cup to Spare) of the Zagreb faction of Zabranjeno Pušenje. During his staying in Paris, Ćeremida also worked as the arranger and co-producer on the album by French singer Alexandra Ross, and took part in the recording of the 1996 album Ruže u asfaltu (Roses in Asphalt) by Teška Industrija.

Of the band members, only Samir Ćeremida remained in Sarajevo during the war. After the war ended, in 1996, he started a cafe in the city.

In 1996, Jugoton successor Croatia Records released two compilation albums entitled Everblue. Alongside band's old hits, the compilations featured four previously unreleased songs – "Zarazi me" ("Infect Me"), "O la la", "Mladene" ("(Oh,) Mladen") and "Suada" early demo.

=== Reunion and new releases (1998–2024) ===
The band reunited in Slovenia in 1998, with Lošić on vocals and guitar, Samir Ćeremida on bass guitar, Admir Ćeremida on drums, and new guitarist Saša Zalepugin, formerly of the Zagreb-based band La Fortunjeros, son of the popular same-name presenter of Television Zagreb. The band released their comeback album entitled Longplay in the spring of 1998, with the album title alluding to the fact that all the members of the band were 33 years old at the time of the album release. The album was co-produced by Lošić and Nikša Bratoš, who also played guitar and keyboards on the album recording. The album also featured guest appearance by Marijan Brkić on guitar and backing vocals. Lošić was the principal songwriter, with some of the songs featuring Samir Ćeremida, Brkić and former Crvena Jabuka member Zlatko Arslanagić as co-authors. The album featured sentimental pop rock sound resembling the band's early works and was excellently received by the audience in former Yugoslav republics. Its biggest hit was the song "Ako su to samo bile laži" ("If Those Were Only Lies"), featuring the remix of the guitar riff from Primal Scream's hit "Rocks". Later during the year, Slovenian band Buldožer and Serbian singer-songwriter Vlada Divljan on their joint concerts performed a humorous cover of "Ako su to samo bile laži" entitled "Ako su to samo bile pare" ("If That Was Only Money"). Plavi Orkestar started the promotion of the album with two sold-out concerts at Ljubljana's Križanke Outdoor Theatre, held on 25 May (celebrated in SFR Yugoslavia as the Youth Day) and 26 May 1998. The concerts were followed by a successful concert in Sarajevo. The band returned to Sarajevo in March 1999, appearing, under the name Saša Lošić and Sarajevo Old Stars, on the re-established Vaš šlager sezone (Your Schlager of the Season) festival with the song "Šampion" ("Champion").

In 1999, the band released the album Beskonačno (Infinite), stylized as $\infty$ on the cover, with some of the songs being folk-influenced. The album was co-produced by Lošić, Nikša Bratoš and Janez Križaj. Once again, Bratoš and Brkić made guest appearances on the album, with other guests including Goce Dimovski (on kaval, gajde, zurla and tambura), Goce Uzunski (on tapan, tarabuka and percussion) and Špela Možina (recitation). The album featured the song "Djevojka iz snova" ("Dream Girl"), which was a cover of the song "Djevojka bez činela" ("The Girl Without Cymbals") by Elvis J. Kurtović & His Meteors, a cover of "Pijem da je zaboravim" ("I'm Drinking to Forget Her") by folk singer Hašim Kučuk "Hoki", and a cover of the song "O kakav mesec" ("Oh, What Moonlight") by Đorđe Marjanović, Marjanović's song itself being a cover of Domenico Modugno's "Guarda che Luna". The album also featured the ballad "Zauvijek" ("Forever"), originally written by Lošić for Crvena Jabuka and originally recorded on their 1996 album Svijet je lopta šarena (The World Is a Colorful Ball).

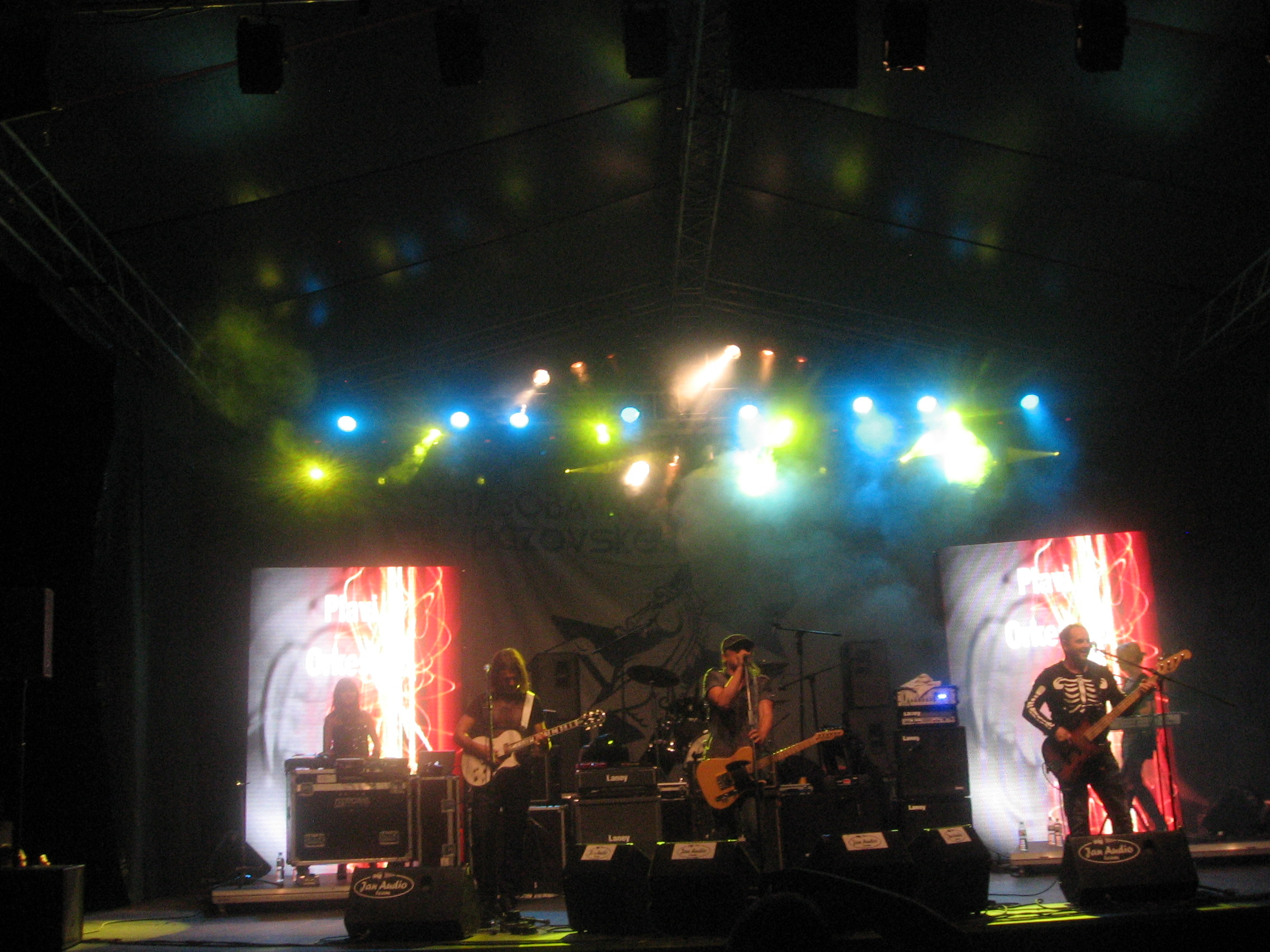
Plavi Orkestar performing in Stara Pazova in 2011

In 2011, a documentary about the band, entitled Orkestar and directed by Pjer Žalica, premiered at the Sarajevo Film Festival. The following year, the band released their seventh and latest studio album, entitled Sedam (Seven). The album was produced by Bratoš, and all the songs were authored by Lošić, with the exception of the lyrics for "Bi li pošla sa mnom" ("Would You Come With Me"), written by singer-songwriter Zlatan Stipišić Gibonni. The song "Od kod si doma" ("Where Are You From") featured Slovene language lyrics. The song "Ti misliš da je meni lako" ("You Think I Have It Going On") featured guest appearance by folk singer Dragana Mirković, and the song "(R)evolucija" ("(R)evolution") featured the members of the band Dubioza Kolektiv. Other guest appearances included Bruno Urlić (viola, violin), Dalibor Marinković (drums) and the members of Belgrade-based Beatles tribute band The Bestbeat.

In 2019, the band went on a hiatus, prolonged by the COVID-19 pandemic. They announced that they were returning to performing in the summer of 2024, also stating they were working on a new studio album. The band had their first performance since 2019 on Lent Festival in Maribor, on 27 June 2024.

=== Default lineup reunion (2025–present) ===
In October 2024, it was announced that the band's default lineup, featuring Lošić, Ćeremida brothers and Mladen Pavičić, would reunite 33 years after the Yugoslav Wars forced them to split up. The default lineup had their first performance since 1992 on 2025 Valentine's Day in Arena Zagreb.

== Legacy ==
Plavi Orkestar song "Sava tiho teče" was covered by Croatian dance group Karma on their 2002 album Zavrti život (Spin Your Life). "Bolje biti pijan nego star" was covered by Bosnian and Yugoslav rock band Teška Industrija on their 2011 album Bili smo raja (We Were Friends). The song "Ti si moja sudbina" ("You're My Destiny") was covered by Serbian pop band The Frajle on their 2019 cover album Obraduj Me (Make Me Joyful).

In 2015, Soldatski bal was polled No.97 on the list of 100 Greatest Yugoslav Albums published by the Croatian edition of Rolling Stone.

In 2000, "Bolje biti pijan nego star" was polled No.75 on the Rock Express Top 100 Yugoslav Rock Songs of All Times list. In 2006, "Goodbye Teens" was polled No.97 on the B92 Top 100 Domestic Songs list.

== Members ==
Current members

- Saša Lošić "Loša" – vocals, guitar (1982–1992, 1998–present)
- Admir Ćeremida "Ćera II" – drums (1982–1992, 1998–present)
- Samir Ćeremida "Ćera I" – bass guitar (1983–1992, 1998–present)
- Robert Pikl – guitar (2025–present)

Former members

- Srđan Krošnjar – guitar (1982–1983)
- Gordan Džamonja – bass guitar (1982–1983)
- Mladen Pavičić – guitar (1982–1992, 2025)
- Saša Zalepugin – guitar (1998–2025)

== Discography ==
=== Studio albums ===
- Soldatski bal (Jugoton, 1985)
- Smrt fašizmu! (Jugoton, 1986)
- Sunce na prozoru (Jugoton, 1989)
- Simpatija (Diskoton, 1991)
- Longplay (Nika Records, 1998)
- Infinity (Nika Records, 1999)
- Sedam (Dallas Records, 2012)

=== Compilation albums ===
- Everblue 1 (1996)
- Everblue 2 (1996)
- The Ultimate Collection (2007)
- The Platinum Collection (2007)
- Najlepše ljubavne pesme (2010)
- Greatest Hits Collection (2016)

== See also ==
- New Primitives
- New Partisans
