= Soldatski bal =

Studio album by Plavi orkestar
- Released: 28 March 1985
- Recorded: January–February 1985
- Studio: SIM studio, Zagreb
- Genre: Pop, folk rock
- Label: Jugoton
- Producer: Husein Hasanefendić

Plavi orkestar chronology
Soldatski bal (1985)	Smrt fašizmu (1986)

Soldatski bal (translation: The Soldiers' Ball) is the debut studio album by Yugoslav band Plavi orkestar, released on 28 March 1985 through Jugoton. With over 500,000 copies sold, it is the best-selling debut album in Yugoslavia and its successor states.

Recorded during January 1985 and released a few months later, the album was a huge commercial success, spawning numerous hits. It catapulted a band of 21-year-olds to nationwide fame, making them instant teen idols.

The album's lyrics are mostly inspired by Saša Lošić's compulsory military service, which he served in Bitola from September 1983 until September 1984. The album features numerous guest appearances, including Nada Obrić, Aki Rahimovski of Parni valjak, Jura Stublić of Film, Peđa D'Boy of Dʼ Boys, Ivan "Firchie" Fece of EKV, Marina Perazić, Dragoš Kalajić, and Jovan Ćirilov.

The album sleeve was designed by Bojan Hadžihalilović. In a replica of the Beatles' Sgt. Pepper's Lonely Hearts Club Band, it shows the four band members flanked by the seven Yugoslav Youth Communist League (SKOJ) secretaries, in addition to 49 individuals from Yugoslav history and public life such as Petar II Petrović-Njegoš, Ivo Lola Ribar, Bata Živojinović, Lepa Brena, Vuk Karadžić, Slavko Štimac, Miroslav Krleža, Oliver Mandić, Mirza Delibašić, etc. In 2015 the album cover was ranked 58th on the list of 100 Greatest Album Covers of Yugoslavian Rock published by web magazine Balkanrock.

== Track listing ==
All tracks are written by Saša Lošić except where noted.

Side A
No.	Title	Length
1.	"Suada" (Saša Lošić / Mladen Pavičić)	2:50
2.	"(Medena curice) Daj mi vruće rakije"	3:10
3.	"Gujo, vrati se"	2:40
4.	"Odlazi nam raja"	2:45
5.	"Šta će nama šoferima kuća"	3:03
6.	"Bolje biti pijan nego star"	4:15

Side B
No.	Title	Length
1.	"Good Bye Teens"	3:35
2.	"Stambol, Pešta, Bečlija"	2:45
3.	"Parajlija"	3:20
4.	"Kad mi kažeš, Paša"	3:37
5.	"Soldatski bal"	4:30

== Personnel ==
- Bass guitar — Ćera I
- Drums — Ćera II
- Drums, vocals — Firči
- Engineer — Vladimir Smolec
- Executive producer — Malcolm Muharem
- Guitar, arranged by — Pava
- Keyboards — Zoran Kraš
- Photography — Mehmed Akšamija
- Producer — Husein Hasanefendić
- Vocals, voice, arranged by — Saša Lošić
- Guest vocal on "Šta će nama šoferima kuća" — Nada Obrić
- Guest vocals on "Stambol, Pešta, Bečlija" — Aki Rahimovski, Jura Stublić, and Peđa D'Boy
- Backing vocals on "Bolje biti pijan nego star" — Dragoš Kalajić and Jovan Ćirilov

== Sound-alike ==
Song "Bolje biti pijan nego star" use melody as in "Dok palme nijšu grane" by Dubrovački trubaduri.
