= Moja je pjesma lagana =

Single by Parni Valjak

from the album Sjaj u očima
- Released: October 1988
- Recorded: 1988
- Genre: pop, rock, ballad
- Label: Jugoton

Moja je pjesma lagana (My song is light) is song by Zagreb band Parni Valjak. It was released in 1988 on album Sjaj u očima (Shine in eyes). It is one of their greatest hits.

== Composition ==
It is composed and written by Husein Hasanefendiċ.

== Music video ==
Video was filmed in Zagreb during fall same year.
