= Husein Hasanefendić =

Yugoslav rock musician

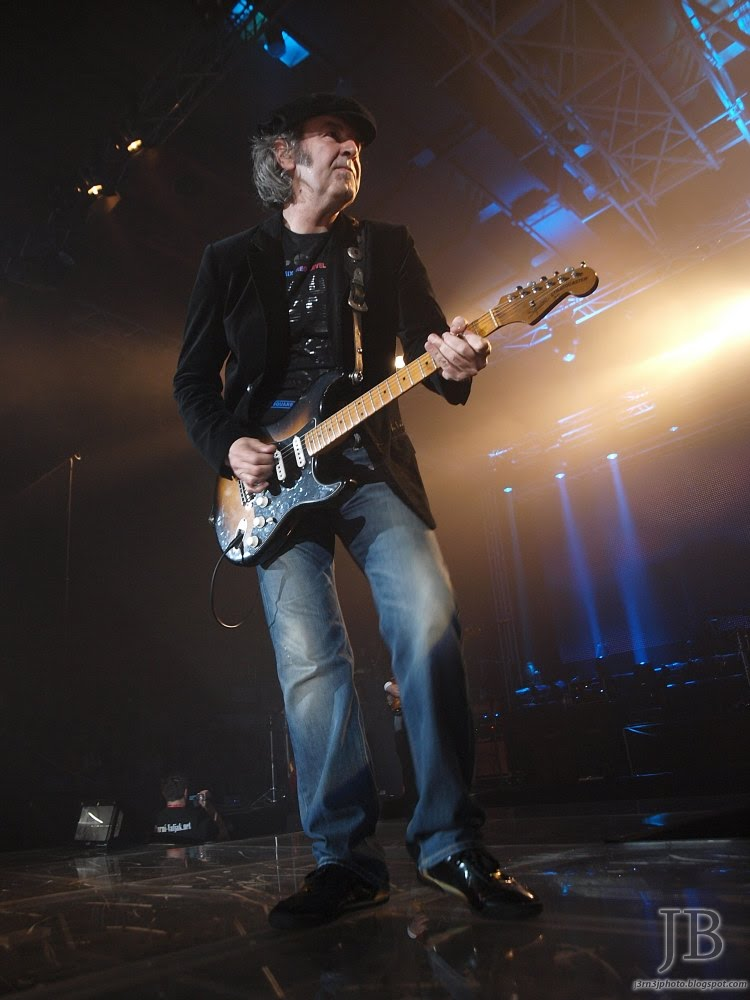
- Husein Hasanefendić performing with Parni Valjak in 2010

Background information
- Born: 30 January 1954 (age 72); Banja Luka, PR Bosnia and Herzegovina, FPR Yugoslavia
- Genres: Rock; hard rock; boogie rock; new wave; pop rock
- Occupations: Guitarist; singer; songwriter; music producer
- Instruments: Guitar; vocals
- Years active: 1968–present
- Labels: PGP-RTB; CBS Records; Suzy; Jugoton; Croatia Records; Orfej; Esnaf; Master Music; PGP-RTS
- Formerly of: Grupa 220

Husein Hasanefendić "Hus" (born 30 January 1954) is a Croatian and Yugoslav rock musician, songwriter and music producer, best known as the guitarist, leader and principal songwriter of the highly popular band Parni Valjak.

Hasanefendić rose to prominence at the beginning of the 1970s, as the guitarist for the already established Grupa 220. With Grupa 220, he recorded their second and last studio album, Slike, released in 1975. The group disbanded after the album release, and the band's guitarists Hasanefendić and Jurica Pađen formed Parni Valjak with vocalist Aki Rahimovski, bass guitarist Zlatko Miksić "Fuma" and drummer Srećko Antonioli. The band gained success with their 1970s releases featuring their boogie rock sound, and nationwide popularity with their 1980 new wave-oriented album Vruće igre. On their following releases, the band made a shift towards mainstream rock sound, remaining one of the top acts of the Yugoslav rock scene until the dissolution of the country, managing to maintain their popularity in independent Croatia and other former Yugoslav republics after the country's breakup. After Rahimovski's death in 2022, Hasanefendić has remained the only original member of the band.

In addition to working with Parni Valjak, Hasanefendić has composed songs and has produced albums by other artists. Alongside six Parni Valjak albums, he has produced albums by Haustor, Stidljiva Ljubičica, Patrola, Animatori, Plavi Orkestar, Cacadou Look, Boris Novković and other prominent artists of Yugoslav and Croatian music scenes.

== Biography ==
=== Early life and career ===
Hasanefendić was born on 30 January 1954 in Banja Luka. His father was a successful painter. He started his career in the late 1960s, as a member of the group Ab Ovo.

=== Grupa 220 ===
In 1971, Hasanefendić joined the already established Grupa 220, replacing guitarist Duško Žutić. At the time, Grupa 220 featured two of his former bandmates from Ab Ovo, bass guitarist Nenad Zubak and drummer Ivan "Piko" Stančić. Prior to Hasanefendić joining the band, Grupa 220 had already gained large success on the Yugoslav rock scene with their 7-inch singles and 1968 debut album Naši dani (Our Days), featuring songs composed by their frontman Drago Mlinarec. In the period following Hasaenefdić's arrival, the members of the group decided to turn away from the band's early beat sound towards harder sound, which led to disagreements between Mlinarec and rest of the members. Mlinarec left the group in 1972, the band releasing their first 7-inch single recorded without Mlinarec during the same year. On the single, Hasanefendić debuted as songwriter, with his song "Dubi-du-di, dubi-du-da". In the following years, the band gained reputation of an energetic live act, but their second studio album Slike (Images), released in 1975 and featuring three songs composed by Hasanefendić, did not gain commercial and critical success as their early Mlinarec-authored works. The group disbanded after the album release, Hasanefendić and the band's second guitarist, Jurica Pađen, deciding to form a new band with the help of manager Vladimir Mihaljek.

=== Parni Valjak (1975–2005, 2009–2022) ===
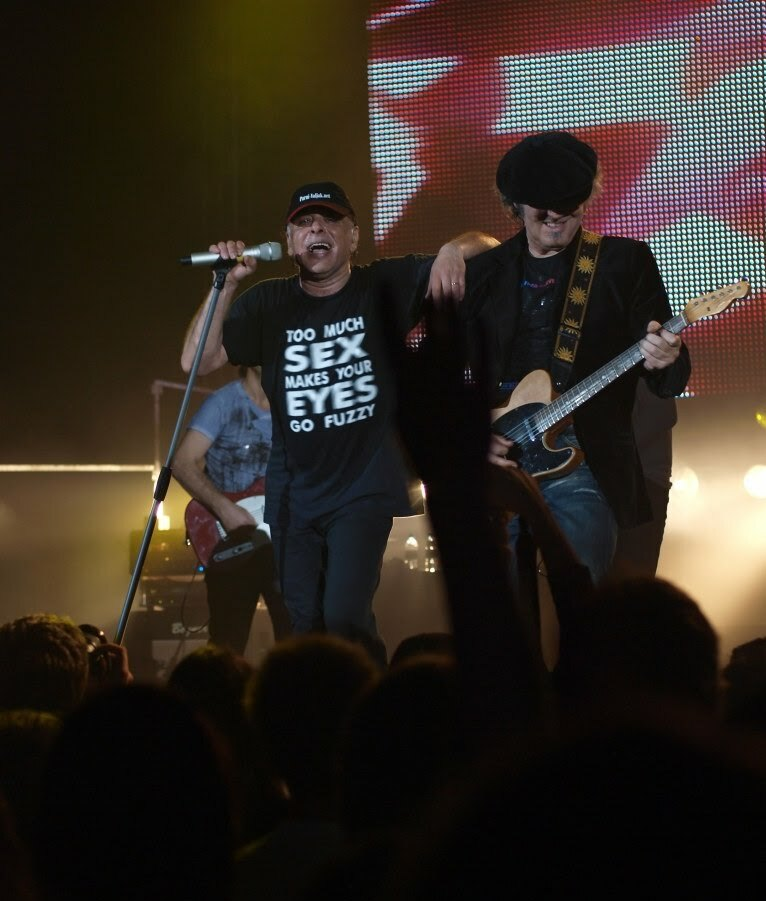
Aki Rahimovski (left) and Hasanefendić (right) performing with Parni Valjak in 2010. From the band's formation in 1975 until Rahimovski's death in 2022, the two were the key figures and the only mainstay members of Parni Valjak.

Hasanefendić was among the forming members of Parni Valjak, alongside Aki Rahimovski (vocals), Jurica Pađen (guitar), Zlatko Miksić "Fuma" (bass guitar) and Srećko Antonioli (drums). During the following decades, Hasanefendić and Rahimovski would remain the key figures and the only two mainstay members of the band. Immediately attracting the attention of the public with their energetic live performances and boogie rock sound, the band gained popularity with their early studio albums, Dođite na show! (Come to the Show!) and Glavom kroz zid (Head Against the Wall). After a brief attempt to break into foreign market with an English language album released under the name Steam Roller, the band joined in on the Yugoslav new wave scene with the 1980 album Vruće igre (Hot Games), which launched them to the top of the Yugoslav rock scene. With their following releases the band made a shift towards mainstream rock sound, scoring a large number of hits and remaining one of the most popular Yugoslav rock acts until the country's dissolution. They maintained large popularity in Croatia during the early 1990s, also restoring their popularity in other former Yugoslav republics in the following years and decades. In 2005, the group announced their disbandment, only to reunite in 2009, continuing to sell out large venues in former Yugoslav region. After Rahimovski's death in 2022, Parni Valjak continued their activity with vocalist Igor Drvenkar, Hasanefendić remaining the sole original member of the group. During the band's career, Hasanefendić has recorded lead vocals for several Parni Valjak tracks, most prominently 1980 song "Ne udaraj me nisko" ("No Low Blows"), 1983 song "A ja bih s vragom..." ("And I Would With the Devil...") and 1984 song "Stojim već satima" ("I've Been Standing for Hours").

=== Solo releases ===
Hasanefendić has released only two singles as a solo artist, "Pjesmica" ("Little Song") and "Bar na dan" ("At Least for a Day"), both released in 2021 in digital format only.

=== Production ===
Hasanefendić debut as a producer on Parni Valjak's second album Glavom kroz zid (Head Against the Wall). He has produced six Parni Valjak albums, as well as albums Haustor, Stidljiva Ljubičica, Patrola, Animatori, Plavi Orkestar, Cacadou Look, Boris Novković and other prominent artists of Yugoslav and Croatian music scenes.

=== Guest appearances and other collaborations ===
In 1981, Hasanefendić produced Haustor's self-titled debut, playing guitar in several songs. In 1985, Hasanefendić, alongside Rahimovski, took part in the YU Rock Misija project, a Yugoslav contribution to Live Aid, contributing vocals to the song "Za milion godina". In 1987, he made a guest appearance on Nebojša Krstić and Srđan Šaper album Poslednja mladost u Jugoslaviji (The Last Youth in Yugoslavia), playing guitar in the song "Razvod 1999." ("Divorce 1999"). In 1999, he made a guest appearance on Plava Trava Zaborava live album 16 Nam Je Godina Tek – Koncert (We're Only 16 – Concert), in the cover of the Little Willie John song "Need Your Love So Bad". In 2007, together with Rahimovski, he made a guest appearance on Vanna album Ledeno doba (Ice Age), in the cover of Parni Valjak song "Stranica dnevnika" ("A Page from a Diary").

Hasanefendić wrote the song "Kaži da l' je ljubav" ("Say if It's Love") for Croatian singer Severina, published on her 1992 self-titled album. For Croatian singer Tony Cetinski he wrote the song "The Game", released on his 1998 album A1. For Serbian singer Tijana Dapčević he wrote the song "Ranjena" ("Wounded"), released on her 2004 album Zemlja mojih snova (Land of My Dreams). He wrote the songs "Kasna jesen" ("Late Autumn") and "Eto pjesma" ("There's the Song") for Rade Šerbedžija's 2020 album Ne okreći se, sine (Don't Turn Around, Son).

=== Private life ===
Hasanefendić's is a collector of paintings.

== Legacy ==
In 1998, Parni Valjak album Anđeli se dosađuju? (Angels Are Bored?) was polled No. 82 on the list of 100 Greatest Albums of Yugoslav Popular Music in the book YU 100: najbolji albumi jugoslovenske rok i pop muzike (YU 100: The Best albums of Yugoslav pop and rock music). Additionally, Haustor's debut self-titled album produced by Hasanefendić was polled No. 29 on the list. In 1987, in YU legende uživo (YU Legends Live), a special publication by Rock magazine, the band's live album Koncert (Concert) was proclaimed one of 12 best Yugoslav live albums.

In 2000, four Parni Valjak songs appeared on the Rock Express Top 100 Yugoslav Rock Songs of All Times list: "Sve još miriše na nju" ("Everything Still Smells of Her") polled No. 22, "Jesen u meni" ("Autumn in Me") polled No. 48, "Stranica dnevnika" polled No. 57 and "Hvala ti" ("Thank You") polled No. 85. In 2006, the band's song "Uhvati ritam" ("Catch the Beat") was polled No. 68 and "Stranica dnevnika" was polled No. 96 on the B92 Top 100 Domestic Songs list.

== Discography ==
=== With Parni Valjak ===
==== Studio albums ====
- Dođite na show! (1976)
- Glavom kroz zid (1977)
- Gradske priče (1979)
- City Kids (as Steam Roller, 1980)
- Vruće igre (1980)
- Vrijeme je na našoj strani (1981)
- Glavnom ulicom (1983)
- Uhvati ritam (1984)
- Pokreni se! (1985)
- Anđeli se dosađuju? (1987)
- Sjaj u očima (1988)
- Lovci snova (1990)
- Buđenje (1993)
- Samo snovi teku uzvodno (1997)
- Zastave (2000)
- Pretežno sunčano? (2004)
- Stvarno nestvarno (2011)
- Vrijeme (2018)

==== Live albums ====
- Koncert (1982)
- E = mc² (1985)
- Svih 15 godina (1990)
- Bez struje – Live in ZeKaeM (1995)
- Kao nekada / Live at S.C. (2001)
- Dovoljno je reći... Aki (2022)

==== Compilation albums ====
- Parni Valjak (1985)
- Samo sjećanja (1991)
- Pusti nek' traje, kolekcija vol. 1 (1991)
- Najveći hitovi (1997)
- Balade(1998)
- Koncentrat 1977.-1983. (2005)
- Koncentrat 1984.-2005. (2005)
- The Ultimate Collection (2009)
- Najljepše ljubavne pjesme (2010)
- The Best Of (2010)
- Nema predaje (2013)
- Greatest Hits Collection (2017)
- Vrijeme ljubavi (2022)

==== Box sets ====
- Original Album Collection Vol. 1 (2015)
- Original Album Collection Vol. 2 (2015)
- Antologija (2017)

==== Video albums ====
- Koncert (1988)
- Live – Zagreb, Dom sportova 2. XII 2000. (2002)
- Bez struje – Live in ZeKaeM (2005)
- Live Beogradska arena (2011)
- Live in Pula (2017)

==== Singles ====
- "Parni valjak" / "Šizofrenik" (1976)
- "Tako prođe tko ne pazi kad ga Parni valjak zgazi / "Dok si mlad" (1976)
- "Ljubavni jadi jednog Parnog valjka" / "Teško je biti sam" (1976)
- "Prevela me mala žednog preko vode" / "O šumama, rijekama i pticama" (1976)
- "'Oću da se ženim" / "Ljeto" (1977)
- "Lutka za bal" / "Crni dani" (1977)
- "Od motela do motela" / "Predstavi je kraj (u živo)" (1978)
- "Stranica dnevnika" / "Ulične tuče" (1979)
- "Motel to Motel" / "When the Show Is Done" (1979)
- "Neda" / "Hvala ti" (1981)
- "Moje dnevne paranoje" / "Ona je tako prokleto mlada" (1982)
- "Uhvati ritam" / "Samo ona zna" (1984)
- "Kekec je slobodan, red je na nas" (1991)
- "Kaži ja (Boje jeseni)" / "Sai Baba Blues" (1997)
- "Tko nam brani" / "Dok si pored mene" (2002)

=== Solo ===
==== Singles ====
- "Pjesmica" (2021)
- "Bar na dan" (2021)

=== As producer ===
==== Studio albums ====
- Parni Valjak – Glavom kroz zid (1977)
- Parni Valjak – Vrijeme je na našoj strani (1981)
- Haustor – Haustor (1981)
- Stidljiva Ljubičica – Osvrni se na mene (1981)
- Patrola – U sredini (1981)
- Parni Valjak – Koncert (1982)
- Tora – Tora (1982)
- Parni Valjak – Glavnom ulicom (1983)
- Animatori – Svi momci i djevojke (1983)
- Plavi Orkestar – Soldatski bal (1984)
- Parni Valjak – E = mc² (1985)
- Cacadou Look – Tko mari za čari (1987)
- Parni Valjak – Anđeli se dosađuju? (1987)
- Leteći Odred – Među zvijezdama (1992)
- Boris Novković – Struji struja (1993)

==== Singles ====
- Parni Valjak – "Lutka za bal" / "Crni dani" (1978)
- Parni Valjak – "Od motela do motela / "Predstavi je kraj (u živo)" (1979)
- Azra – "A šta da radim" / "Balkan" (1979)
- Azra – "Lijepe žene prolaze kroz grad" / "Suzy F." / "Poziv na ples" (1980)
- Haustor – "Moja prva ljubav" / "Pogled u BB" (1981)
- Stidljiva Ljubičica – "Volim te" / "Moj prijatelj ide u vojsku" (1981)
- Stidljiva Ljubičica – "Osvrni se na mene" / "Ostajem sam" (1981)
- Problemi – "Sranje" (on Novi punk val 78-80, 1981)
- Haustor – "Radio" / "Crni žbir" (1981)
- Animatori – "Kao ogledala" / "Ostat ću mlad" (1984)
- Parni Valjak – "Ugasi me" / "Ugasi me (Instrumental)" (1985)
- Parni Valjak – "Kekec je slobodan, red je na nas" (on Rock za Hrvatsku!, 1991)
