= Smrt fašizmu! =

Smrt fašizmu

Studio album by Plavi orkestar
- Released: 1986
- Recorded: September 14 – November 24, 1986
- Studio: SIM studio, Zagreb
- Genre: Rock; Pop rock
- Label: Jugoton
- Producer: Plavi Orkestar

Plavi orkestar chronology
Soldatski bal (1985)	Smrt fašizmu (1986)	Sunce na prozoru (1989)

Smrt fašizmu (trans. Death to fascism) is the second studio album by the Yugoslav/Bosnian band Plavi orkestar, released in 1986. To date, it has been certified diamond, selling over 300,000 copies in the former Yugoslavia.

== Track listing ==
All songs by Saša Lošić

=== Side A ===
1. "Fa, fa fašista nemoj biti ti (jerbo ću te ja draga ubiti)"
2. "Mangup"
3. "Jovanka"
4. "To je šok"
5. "Puteru, puteru"
6. "Sava tiho teče"

=== Side B ===
1. "Ustani, voljena sejo"
2. "Zelene su bile oči te"
3. "Valcer"
4. "U Jevrema slika ta"
5. "Nisam je probudio"
6. "Kad si sam, druže moj"
7. "Kada plaču grlice"
