= Saša Lošić =

Bosnian recording artist (born 1964)

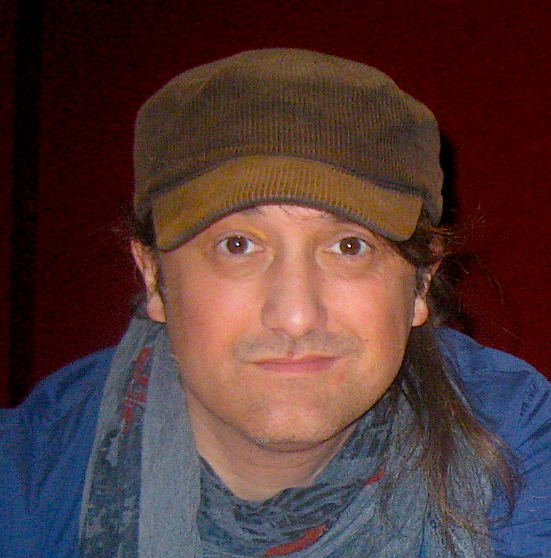

Background information
- Born: 19 July 1964 (age 61); Banja Luka, SR Bosnia and Herzegovina, Yugoslavia
- Genres: Pop rock; power pop; folk rock
- Occupations: Guitarist; singer; songwriter; composer; music producer
- Instruments: Vocals; guitar
- Years active: 1981–present
- Labels: Jugoton; Diskoton; Croatia Records; Nika; Pop Records; Dallas Records

Saša Lošić "Loša" (Serbian Cyrillic: Саша Лошић „Лоша”; born 19 July 1964) is a Bosnian singer, guitarist, songwriter, composer and music producer currently residing in Slovenia. He is best known as the frontman of the highly popular pop rock band Plavi Orkestar.

Lošić started his musical career at the age of sixteen, forming Plavi Orkestar with a group of Sarajevo teenagers. The group gained nationwide popularity with their folk-influenced pop rock debut Soldatski bal, released in 1985, with Lošić and rest of the members rising to the status of Yugoslav teen stars, despite mixed reactions to the album coming from the country's music press. On their following release, 1986 album Smrt fašizmu!, Plavi Orkestar presented themselves with the New Partisans concept, to general dislike of the critics and lukewarm reaction of the group's fans. The band turned towards sentimental pop rock with their following two releases, scoring a number of hit songs. Plavi Orkestar disbanded with the outbreak of the Bosnian War in 1992, with Lošić emigrating to Slovenia. During the 1990s, he wrote songs for other artists, including Crvena Jabuka, Severina, Rade Šerbedžija and Tanja Ribič, and started composing for theatre and cinema. In 1998, Plavi Orkestar reunited, seeing renewed popularity in former Yugoslav republics. Up to date, Lošić has released 7 studio albums with Plavi Orkestar and has composed music for 12 feature films, two television shows and a number of short films and theatre plays. He has performed his film music live with his Saša Lošić Film Orchestra.

== Musical career ==
=== Plavi Orkestar ===
Lošić started his musical career in 1981 as a gymnasium student, forming the band Ševin Orkestar (The Lark's Orchestra) with guitarist Srđan Krošnjar, bass guitarist Gordan Džamonja and drummer Admir Ćeremida "Ćera II". The following year, the four teenagers changed their name to Plavi Orkestar. In 1983, the four were joined by experienced guitarist Mladen Pavičić "Pava". The band got a steady lineup in late 1983, with the departure of Krošnjar and Džamonja and the arrival of Admir Ćeremida's twin brother, bass guitarist Samir Ćeremida "Ćera I". In the early stage of their career, Plavi Orkestar were associated with the New Primitivism subcultural movement, but after working with manager Goran Marić, alias Malkolm Muharem, they turned towards commercial folk-influenced pop rock and power pop sound. Their debut album Soldatski bal (Soldier's Ball), released in 1985, saw mixed reactions by the Yugoslav music critics, but achieved large success with the country's teen audience, becoming the best-selling debut album in the history of Yugoslav popular music, and placing Plavi Orkestar alongside other mega-selling acts of the Yugoslav rock scene like Bijelo Dugme, Riblja Čorba and Bajaga i Instruktori. In 1986, the band released the album Smrt fašizmu! (Death to Fascism!), presenting themselves with the New Partisans concept, featuring lyrics and imagery inspired by Yugoslav Partisans and Yugoslavism. The album was generally disliked by the critics and was met with lukewarm reactions from the band's former fans, the members ending their cooperation with Malkolm Muharem and deciding to make a discographic hiatus. With the album Sunce na prozoru (Sun on the window), released in 1989, the band turned to sentimental pop rock sound. Despite not repeating the nationwide success of the group's first album, Sunce na prozoru and their following release, the 1991 album Simpatija (Crush), brought a number of hit songs. The outbreak of the Bosnian War in 1992 forced the band members to end their activity, with Lošić emigrating to Slovenia.

In 1998, Plavi Orkestar reunited in Slovenia, featuring Lošić, Ćeremida brothers and new guitarist Saša Zalepugin. The band's 1998 comeback album Longplay was well-received in former Yugoslav republics. The band continued to perform and record new material, releasing two more studio albums since.

=== Songwriting for other artists ===
Lošić began writing for other artists in 1988, with the song "Hvala ti, nebo" ("Thank You, Heaven"), composed on Marina Tucaković's lyrics for Zdravko Čolić's 1988 self-titled album. After emigrating to Slovenia in 1992, Lošić started a career in design and marketing. He continued to compose, writing several songs for Crvena Jabuka, another popular pop rock band whose members emigrated from Sarajevo with the beginning of the Bosnian War, reforming the group in Croatia. The songs were released on Crvena Jabuka's 1995 album U tvojim očima (In Your Eyes), and Lošić joined the group on their promotional tour as a guest. Lošić also wrote songs for Croatian pop singer Severina and for the 1996 album Zaboravi (Forget) by actor and singer Rade Šerbedžija. He wrote several songs for the 1998 album Ko vse utihne (When Everything Goes Quiet) by Slovenian actress and singer Tanja Ribič, including the song "Zbudi se" ("Wake Up"), with which Ribič represented Slovenia at the 1997 Eurovision Song Contest. He wrote the hit "Jagode i čokolada" ("Strawberries and Chocolate") for Croatian pop rock band Đavoli, released on their 1998 album Space Twist.

=== Music for theatre, film and television ===
Lošić has composed music for a number of theatre plays, including Elvis de Luxe performed by Grapefruit theatre troupe, for Slovenian productions of Romeo and Juliet, Mother Courage and Her Children, Lemonade and other plays.

He debuted as a film score composer with music for Andrej Košak's 1997 film Outsider. He has since written music for 11 more feature films, most prominently Andrej Košak's Headnoise (2002), Pjer Žalica's Fuse (2003)—in which he also played a minor role—and Days and Hours (2004), Branko Đurić's Cheese and Jam (2003), Srđan Vuletić's It's Hard to Be Nice (2007), Marko Naberšnik's Rooster's Breakfast (2007) and Shanghai Gypsy (2012), and omnibus film Sex, Drink and Bloodshed (2004). Commercially most successful was the soundtrack for Fuse, released on the soundtrack album Gori vatra (the film's original title). The album brought the hit song "Iznad Tešnja zora sviće" ("The Day Is Dawning Over Tešanj"), as well as a cover of Plavi Orkestar's early hit "Suada" performed by folk singer Šerif Konjević.

In his feature film scores, Lošić has cooperated with numerous prominent musicians including singer and guitarist Momčilo Bajagić Bajaga, guitarist and singer Vlatko Stefanovski, violinist Jovan Kolundžija, singers Rade Šerbedžija, Zdravko Čolić, Dado Topić, Branko Đurić, Tanja Ribič, Severina, Helena Blagne, Usnija Redžepova, Halid Bešlić, Candan Ercetin, and others. In 2004, during the Sarajevo Film Festival, he debuted with his Saša Lošić Film Orchestra, holding a concert of his film scores entitled Hotel Evropa (Hotel Europe) in National Theatre in Sarajevo. The concert featured appearances by singers Halid Bešlić, Hanka Paldum, Leo Martin and others.

Lošić's music was featured in the television series Vratiće se rode (The Storks Will Return) alongside music of other composers, appearing on the 2008 soundtrack album Vratiće se rode. He composed music for the television series Žigosani u reketu (Branded in the racket).

== Legacy ==
In 2015, Soldatski bal was polled No.97 on the list of 100 Greatest Yugoslav Albums published by the Croatian edition of Rolling Stone.

In 2000, Plavi Orkestar song "Bolje biti pijan nego star" was polled No.75 on the Rock Express Top 100 Yugoslav Rock Songs of All Times list. In 2006, the band's song "Goodbye Teens" was polled No.97 on the B92 Top 100 Domestic Songs list.

== Awards ==
- Best Film Score at the Festival of Slovenian Film for Headnoise film score (2002)
- Davorin Award for Best Film Score for Fuse film score (2003)

== Discography ==
=== With Plavi Orkestar ===
==== Studio albums ====
- Soldatski bal (1985)
- Smrt fašizmu! (1986)
- Sunce na prozoru (1989)
- Simpatija (1991)
- Longplay (1998)
- Beskonačno (1999)
- Sedam (2012)

==== Compilation albums ====
- Everblue 1 (1996)
- Everblue 2 (1996)
- The Ultimate Collection (2007)
- The Platinum Collection (2007)
- Najlepše ljubavne pesme (2010)
- Greatest Hits Collection (2016)

=== Solo ===
==== Studio albums ====
- Gori vatra (2003)

== Filmography ==
=== Cinema ===
- Outsider (1997)
- Headnoise (2002)
- Fuse (2003)
- Cheese and Jam (2003)
- Sex, Drink and Bloodshed (2004)
- Days and Hours (2004)
- Ljubav na granici (2005)
- It's Hard to Be Nice (2007)
- Rooster's Breakfast (2007)
- Balkanski sindrom (2007)
- Shanghai Gypsy (2012)
- Adria Blues (2013)

=== Television films ===
- Rode u magli (2009)

=== Television series ===
- Vratiće se rode (2007)
- Žigosani u reketu (2019)
