= Aki Rahimovski =

Serbian- Macedonian rock musician (1955–2022)

Aki Rahimovski Аки Рахимовски
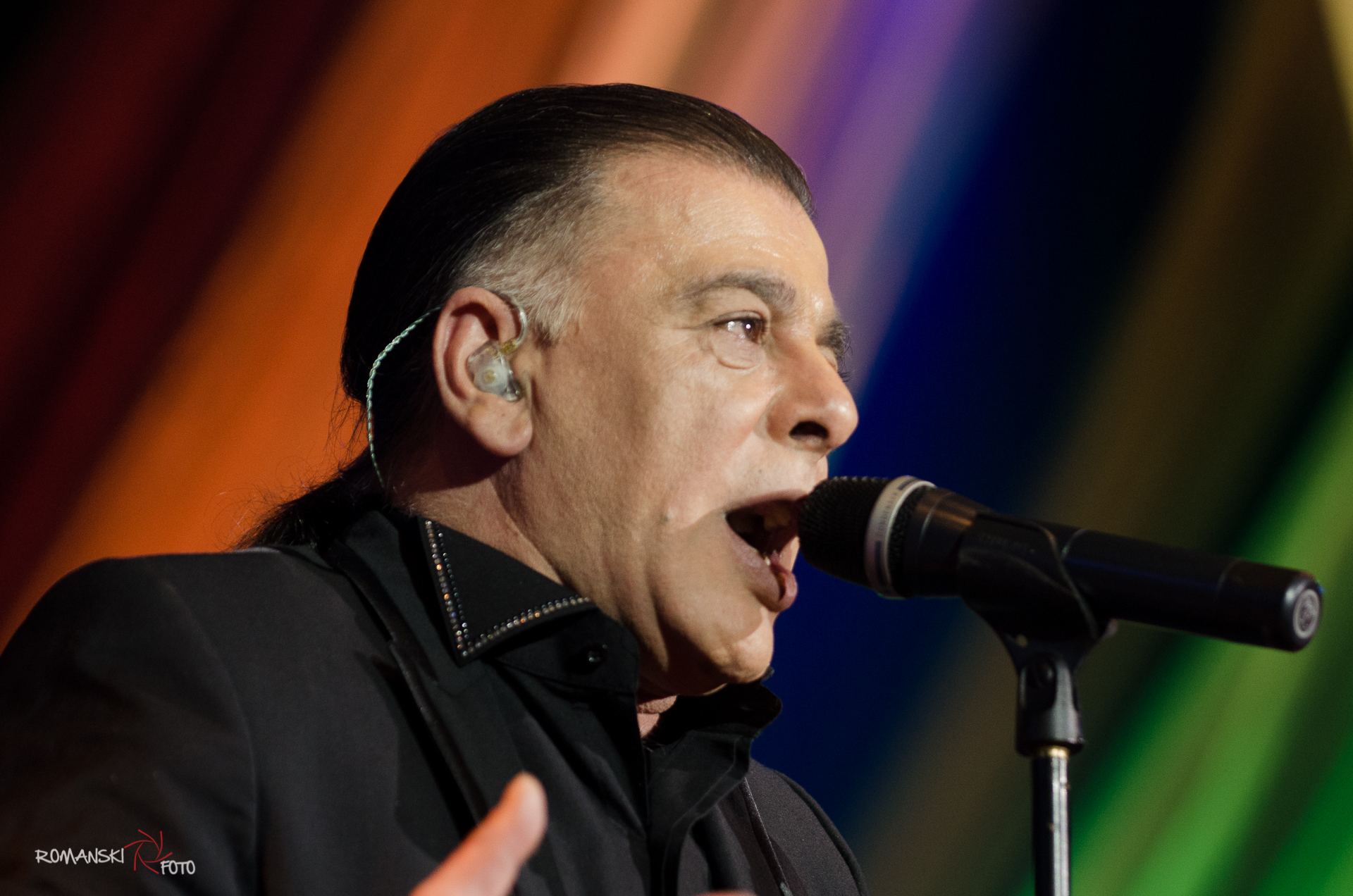
- Aki Rahimovski performing with Parni Valjak in 2013

Background information
- Born: Aleksandar Rahimovski; 5 June 1955; Niš, PR Serbia, FPR Yugoslavia
- Died: 22 January 2022 (aged 66) Novo Mesto, Slovenia
- Genres: Rock; hard rock; boogie rock; new wave; pop rock
- Occupations: Singer; keyboardist; songwriter
- Instruments: Vocals; keyboards
- Years active: 1971–2022
- Labels: PGP-RTB; CBS Records; Suzy; Jugoton; Croatia Records; Orfej; Esnaf; Master Music; PGP-RTS
- Formerly of: Parni Valjak

Aleksandar "Aki" Rahimovski (Macedonian: Александар "Аки" Рахимовски; 5 June 1955 – 22 January 2022) was a Macedonian-Croatian rock musician. Best known as the vocalist of the highly popular band Parni Valjak, Rahimovski is widely considered one of the most prominent vocalists and frontmen of the Yugoslav rock scene.

Rahimovski started his musical career as a teenager, performing as keyboardist and vocalist for several bands from the Yugoslav republic of Macedonia, before joining Zagreb-based Parni Valjak in 1975. With Parni Valjak he achieved large success in the second half of the 1970s and nationwide popularity in the 1980s, the band managing to maintain their popularity in all former Yugoslav republics after the dissolution of the country. With Parni Valjak, Rahimovski had released 18 studio albums, 5 solo albums, 5 video albums and a number of 7-inch singles. He had been the band's vocalist until his death in 2022. In addition to working with Parni Valjak, Rahimovski had a short-lasting solo career during the band's 2005–2009 hiatus, releasing one solo album.

== Biography ==
=== Early life ===
Rahimovski was born into a Torbeši family, in Niš on 5 June 1955, but moved with his family to Skopje at an early age. His father was a music teacher, and at the age of seven Rahimovski enrolled in a music school, attending classes in piano and singing.

=== Early career ===
As a teeneager, Rahimovski was a DJ, before becoming the organist for the band Krvna Braća (Blood Brothers). From Krvna Braća he moved to the band Vakum (Vacuum), and eventually became the vocalist for the band Tor (Thor) when he was 16. With Tor, he performed on the 1975 edition of BOOM Festival held in Zagreb, where he was spotted by manager Vladimir Mihaljek and suggested to guitarists Husein Hasanefendić and Jurica Pađen, who were aspiring to form a new band after they left Grupa 220.

=== Parni Valjak (1975–2005, 2009–2022) ===
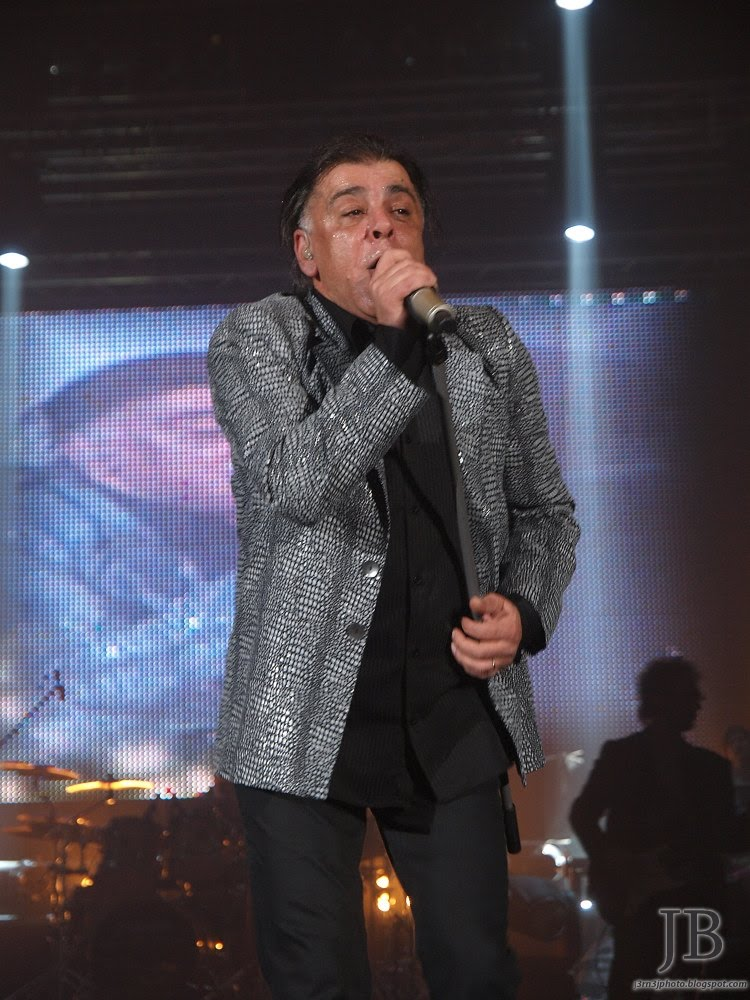
Rahimovski performing with Parni Valjak in 2010

Rahimovski was among the forming members of Parni Valjak, alongside guitarists Husein Hasanefendić and Jurica Pađen, bass guitarist Zlatko Miksić "Fuma" and drummer Srećko Antonioli. During the following decades, Rahimovski and Hasanefendić would remain the key figures and the only two mainstay members of the band. Immediately attracting the attention of the public with their energetic live performances and boogie rock sound, the band gained popularity with their early studio albums, Dođite na show! (Come to the Show!) and Glavom kroz zid (Head Against the Wall). After a brief attempt to break into foreign market with an English language album released under the name Steam Roller, the band joined in on the Yugoslav new wave scene with the 1980 album Vruće igre (Hot Games), which launched them to the top of the Yugoslav rock scene. With their following releases the band made a shift towards mainstream rock sound, scoring a large number of hits and remaining one of the most popular Yugoslav rock acts until the country's dissolution. They maintained large popularity in Croatia during the early 1990s, also restoring their popularity in other former Yugoslav republics in the following years and decades. In 2005, the group announced their disbandment, only to reunite in 2009, continuing to sell out large venues in former Yugoslav region. Rahimovski was the band's vocalist until his death in 2022, recording 18 studio albums, 5 live albums, 5 video albums and a number of 7-inch singles with the group.

=== Solo career (2005–2009) ===
After Parni Valjak disbanded in 2005, Rahimovski started a short-lasting solo career. In 2007, he released his only solo album U vremenu izgubljenih (In the Time of the Lost). Most of the songs on the album were written by Rahimovski's former bandmate from Parni Valjak, drummer Dražen Šolc. The album also featured songs authored by Oleg Colnago and another former Parni Valjak member, keyboardist Berislav Blažević. The album was released with a multimedia bonus CD, featuring music videos and the songs Rahimovski had recorded with other artists: Karolina Gočeva, Zoran Predin, Leilani Marchall, Šank Rock, Zagrebački Solisti, and others.

=== Collaborations and guest appearances ===
In 1985, Rahimovski, alongside Hasanefendić, took part in the YU Rock Misija project, a Yugoslav contribution to Live Aid, contributing vocals to the song "Za milion godina". In 2002, with Mladen Vojičić "Tifa", Dado Topić and Zlatan Fazlić he recorded Fazlić's song "Pjesma za Davora" ("A Song for Davor"), recorded as a tribute to deceased Indexi vocalist Davorin Popović. In 2010, he recorded the song "Kasno je za sve" ("It's Late for Everything") for Toše Proeski tribute album Još uvek sanjam da smo zajedno (I'm Still Dreaming We're Together).

During his career, Rahimovski made a number of guest appearances as guest vocalist on albums by other artists. In 1999, he appeared as guest vocalist on the album 16 nam je godina tek – Koncert (We're Only 16 – Concert) by Croatian and Yugoslav country music band Plava Trava Zaborava, in the cover of Parni Valjak song "Godine prolaze" ("Years Are Passing"), in the cover of Eric Clapton song "Wonderful Tonight" and in the cover of the song "Love Hurts". In 2007, Rahimovski made a series of guest appearances: he appeared as guest on Zoran Predin's album Za šaku ljubavi (For a Handful of Love), in the song "Vilenjak" ("Elf"); on Šank Rock album Senca sebe (Shadow of Myself), in the song "Pesem" ("A Song"); on Neverne Bebe album Iza oblaka (Beyond the Clouds), in the song "Boje duge" ("Colors of the Rainbow"); together with Hasanefendić on Vanna album Ledeno doba (Ice Age), in the cover of Parni Valjak song "Stranica dnevnika" ("A Page from a Diary"). In 2010, he made a guest appearance on Garo & Tavitjan Brothers album Makedonsko srce kuca u 7/8 (Macedonian Heart Beats in the 7/8 Rhythm), recording the vocals for the cover of the traditional song "Snošti sakav da ti dojdam" ("Last Night I Wanted to Come to You"). In 2019, he made a guest appearance on Tihomir Pop Asanović's album Povratak Prvoj Ljubavi / Return To The First Love, in the new version of the song "Domovino moja" ("My Homeland"), originally recorded by Asanović's former band September.

=== Death ===
Rahimovski died on 22 January 2022, aged 66, in Novo Mesto, Slovenia, where he had resided during the last several years of his life. He was buried in the Alley of the Greats at Zagreb's Mirogoj Cemetery. On the day of his burial at 3:00PM, over 50 radio stations in former Yugoslav republics broadcast the band's last song recorded with Rahimovski, "Ponovo" ("Again"). Later in 2022, he was posthumously awarded the Porin Lifetime Achievement Award.

== Family ==
Rahimovski had been married twice. With his first wife he had one child, son Kristijan, who is also a musician. With his second wife, Ingrid, he had one daughter, Edina. He became a father for the third time at the age of 65, when his partner Barbara Vesel gave birth to their daughter Antonija.

== Legacy ==
In 1998, Parni Valjak album Anđeli se dosađuju? (Angels Are Bored?) was polled No. 82 on the list of 100 Greatest Albums of Yugoslav Popular Music in the book YU 100: najbolji albumi jugoslovenske rok i pop muzike (YU 100: The Best albums of Yugoslav pop and rock music). In 1987, in YU legende uživo (YU Legends Live), a special publication by Rock magazine, the band's live album Koncert (Concert) was proclaimed one of 12 best Yugoslav live albums.

In 2000, four Parni Valjak songs appeared on the Rock Express Top 100 Yugoslav Rock Songs of All Times list: "Sve još miriše na nju" ("Everything Still Smells of Her") polled No. 22, "Jesen u meni" ("Autumn in Me") polled No. 48, "Stranica dnevnika" polled No. 57 and "Hvala ti" ("Thank You") polled No. 85. In 2006, the band's song "Uhvati ritam" ("Catch the Beat") was polled No. 68 and "Stranica dnevnika" was polled No. 96 on the B92 Top 100 Domestic Songs list.

== Discography ==
=== with Parni Valjak ===
==== Studio albums ====
- Dođite na show! (1976)
- Glavom kroz zid (1977)
- Gradske priče (1979)
- City Kids (as Steam Roller, 1980)
- Vruće igre (1980)
- Vrijeme je na našoj strani (1981)
- Glavnom ulicom (1983)
- Uhvati ritam (1984)
- Pokreni se! (1985)
- Anđeli se dosađuju? (1987)
- Sjaj u očima (1988)
- Lovci snova (1990)
- Buđenje (1993)
- Samo snovi teku uzvodno (1997)
- Zastave (2000)
- Pretežno sunčano? (2004)
- Stvarno nestvarno (2011)
- Vrijeme (2018)

==== Live albums ====
- Koncert (1980)
- E = mc³ (1985)
- Svih 15 godina (1990)
- Bez struje – Live in ZeKaeM (1995)
- Kao nekada / Live at S.C. (2001)

==== Compilation albums ====
- Parni Valjak (1985)
- Samo sjećanja (1991)
- Pusti nek' traje, kolekcija vol. 1 (1991)
- Najveći hitovi (1997)
- Balade(1998)
- Koncentrat 1977.-1983. (2005)
- Koncentrat 1984.-2005. (2005)
- The Ultimate Collection (2009)
- Najljepše ljubavne pjesme (2010)
- The Best Of (2010)
- Nema predaje (2013)
- Greatest Hits Collection (2017)
- Vrijeme ljubavi (2022)

==== Box sets ====
- Original Album Collection Vol. 1 (2015)
- Original Album Collection Vol. 2 (2015)
- Antologija (2017)

==== Video albums ====
- Koncert (1988)
- Live – Zagreb, Dom sportova 2. XII 2000. (2002)
- Bez struje – Live in ZeKaeM (2005)
- Live Beogradska arena (2011)
- Live in Pula (2018)

==== Singles ====
- "Parni valjak" / "Šizofrenik" (1976)
- "Tako prođe tko ne pazi kad ga Parni valjak zgazi / "Dok si mlad" (1976)
- "Ljubavni jadi jednog Parnog valjka" / "Teško je biti sam" (1976)
- "Prevela me mala žednog preko vode" / "O šumama, rijekama i pticama" (1976)
- "'Oću da se ženim" / "Ljeto" (1977)
- "Lutka za bal" / "Crni dani" (1977)
- "Od motela do motela" / "Predstavi je kraj (u živo)" (1978)
- "Stranica dnevnika" / "Ulične tuče" (1979)
- "Motel to Motel" / "When the Show Is Done" (1979)
- "Neda" / "Hvala ti" (1981)
- "Moje dnevne paranoje" / "Ona je tako prokleto mlada" (1982)
- "Uhvati ritam" / "Samo ona zna" (1984)
- "Kekec je slobodan, red je na nas" (1991)
- "Kaži ja (Boje jeseni)" / "Sai Baba Blues" (1997)
- "Tko nam brani" / "Dok si pored mene" (2002)

=== Solo ===
==== Studio albums ====
- U vremenu izgubljenih (2006)
