= Parni Valjak =

Croatian and Yugoslav rock band

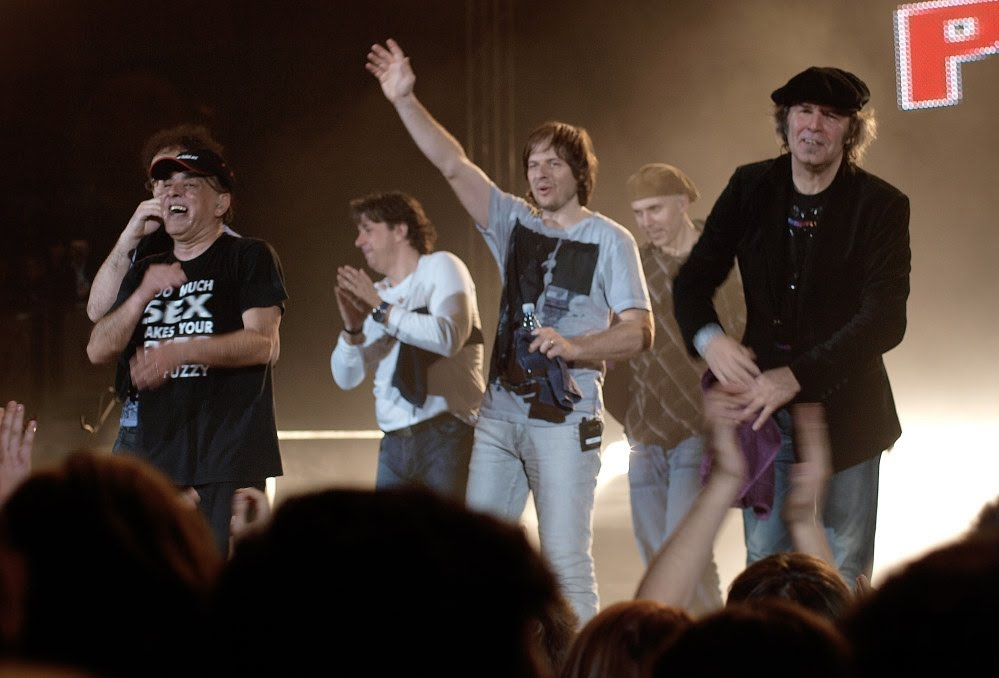
- Parni Valjak in 2010

Background information
- Also known as: Steam Roller
- Origin: Zagreb, Croatia
- Genres: Hard rock; boogie rock; rock; new wave; pop rock
- Years active: 1975–2005; 2009–present
- Labels: PGP-RTB, CBS Records, Suzy, Jugoton, Croatia Records, Orfej, Esnaf, Master Music, PGP-RTS
- Members: Husein Hasanefendić; Zorislav Preskavec; Berislav Blažević; Marijan Brkić; Dalibor Marinković; Igor Drvenkar
- Past members: Aki Rahimovski; Jurica Pađen; Zlatko Miksić; Srećko Antonioli; Branimir Štulić; Zoran Cvetković; Ivan Stančić; Rastko Milošev; Srećko Kukurić; Paolo Sfeci; Miroslav Barbir; Dražen Šolc; Bruno Kovačić; Zvonimir Bučević
- Website: www.parnivaljak.com

Parni Valjak (pronounced [pâːrniː ʋǎːʎak]; trans. Steam Roller) is a Croatian and Yugoslav rock band formed in Zagreb in 1975. They were one of the most popular acts of the Yugoslav rock scene, and have maintained large popularity in all former Yugoslav republics after the breakup of the country.

The band was formed by guitarists Husein Hasanefendić "Hus" and Jurica Pađen (both former members of Grupa 220), vocalist Aki Rahimovski, bass guitarist Zlatko Miksić "Fuma" and drummer Srećko Antonioli. Immediately attracting the attention of the public with their energetic live performances and boogie rock sound, the band gained popularity with their early studio albums, Dođite na show! and Glavom kroz zid. Following the release of their second studio album, Pađen left the band to form Aerodrom, and was for a very brief period of time replaced by Branimir "Johnny" Štulić, later of Azra fame. During the following decades, Hasanefendić and Rahimovski would remain the key figures and the only two mainstay members of the band. After a brief attempt to break into international market with an English language album released under the name Steam Roller, the band joined in on the Yugoslav new wave scene with the 1980 album Vruće igre, which launched them to the top of the Yugoslav rock scene. With their following releases the band made a shift towards mainstream rock sound, scoring a large number of hits and remaining one of the most popular Yugoslav rock acts until the country's dissolution. They maintained large popularity in Croatia during the early 1990s, also restoring their popularity in other former Yugoslav republics in the following years and decades. In 2005, the group announced their disbandment, only to reunite four years later. After Rahimovski's death in 2022, the band continued their activity with vocalist Igor Drvenkar.

== Biography ==
=== Formation, rise to prominence and first releases (1975–1978) ===
After the disbandment of the band Grupa 220, the group's former guitarists Husein Hasanefendić "Hus" and Jurica Pađen and former manager Vladimir Mihaljek decided to form a new band under the name Parni Valjak. At the time, Bijelo Dugme enjoyed the status of the most popular Yugoslav band, and Mihaljek, who had just ended his cooperation with Bijelo Dugme leader Goran Bregović, envisioned Parni Valjak as Zagreb-based competitors of Bijelo Dugme. Hasandefendić and Pađen were joined by veteran bass guitarist Zlatko Miksić "Fuma", former member of Zlatni Akordi and the founder of Boomerang, drummer Srećko Antonioli, formerly of Delfini, and vocalist Aki Rahimovski. Prior to the formation of Parni Valjak, Rahimovski was a DJ, played organ in the band Krvna Braća (Blood Brothers), then moved to the band Vakum (Vacuum) and eventually became a vocalist for Macedonian band Tor (Thor). With Tor, he performed on the 1975 edition of BOOM Festival held in Zagreb, where he was spotted by Mihaljek and suggested to Hasanefendić and Pađen. Parni Valjak was officially formed ond 29 November (celebrated in SFR Yugoslavia as the Republic Day) 1975.

The band immediately gained the attention of the Yugoslav public with their glam rock outfits and three-minute boogie rock tunes released on 7-inch singles. The band had energetic and attractive live performances, but their early singles were criticized by Yugoslav music press because their guitar riffs resembled the riffs from rock foreign hits, and because of trivial lyrics. At the time, the band's lyrics were written by Josip Ivanković, who attempted to imitate lyrics of Bijelo Dugme's Balkan folk-influenced songs; much later, Ivanković would start a successful cooperation with the folk band Zlatni Dukati (Golden Ducats).

In 1976, the band released their debut album, entitled Dođite na show! (Come to the Show!) through PGP-RTB record label. The record was a concept album, telling the story of the rise and decline of the fictional band Ludi Šeširdžija i Jahači Rumene Kadulje (Mad Hatter and the Riders of the Purple Sage); the second part of the band's name was inspired by the title of a Western novel by Zane Grey, which enjoyed large popularity among Yugoslav teenagers during the 1960s. The album songs were written primarily by Hasanefendić and Pađen, although Rahimovski also contributed with his song "Pjesma o starosti" ("Song About Old Age"). The album was co-produced by guitarist Vedran Božić and composer Jovan Adamov. On the album recording, Rahiomvski played the piano, while the synthesizer was played by Hobo keyboardist Mato Došen. Of the album's songs, the title track and "Prevela me mala žednog preko vode" ("Baby Made a Fool Out of Me") saw most airplay. The album also included two instrumental tracks, "Inge" and "Svim slomljenim srcima" ("To All the Broken Hearts"). Following the album release, the band performed on the 1976 edition of BOOM Festival, their song "Ljubavni jadi jednog Parnog valjka" ("Love Miseries of a Steam Roller"), originally released on a 7-inch single, appearing on the various artists live album BOOM '76 recorded on the festival. On the double various artists live album Pop parada I (Pop Parade I), recorded on a concert in Belgrade's Pinki Hall and released in 1977, the band appeared with the songs "O šumama, rijekama i pticama" ("Of the Forests, Rivers and Birds"), "Prevela me mala žednog preko vode" and "Parni valjak".

In 1977, the band released their second album, Glavom kroz zid (Head Against the Wall), featuring the cover designed by renowned comic book artist Igor Kordej. Stylistically similar to their debut, Glavom kroz zid also brought the ballads "Crni dan" ("Dark Day") and "Noć" ("Night"). The album's main hits were the songs "Kravata oko vrata" ("Tie Around the Neck") and "Lutka za bal" ("Doll for the Ball"). Following the album release, the band once again performed on the BOOM Festival, live versions of "Ljubavni jadi jednog Parnog valjka" and "Prevela me mala žednog preko vode" appearing on the various artists live album BOOM '77. In 1978, Hasanefendić and Rahimovski were both drafted to serve their mandatory stints in the Yugoslav People's Army, and Parni Valjak went on hiatus.

=== Reformation, joining in on the new wave scene and nationwide popularity (1979–1980) ===
During the band's hiatus, Pađen decided to leave Parni Valjak to form his own group, Aerodrom. After Hasanefendić and Rahimovski returned from the army, the band continued their activity with new guitarist, Branimir "Johnny" Štulić. The lineup featuring Štulić lasted for only two weeks, and he would leave Parni Valjak to reform his band Azra, Hasanefendić producing their debut single; however, the brief cooperation would influence Parni Valjak's sound in the following several years.

At the time, American record label CBS Records got interested in the band, and would co-release their third studio album and several future releases with Yugoslav record label Suzy. The band recorded their 1979 album Gradske priče (City Stories) in Milan, with Italian producer Valentino Maggioni. The album was recorded by a new lineup of the band, consisting of Hasanefendić, Rahimovski, Miksić, guitarist Zoran Cvetković (formerly of Prljavo Kazalište) and drummer Ivan "Piko" Stančić (formerly of Grupa 220 and Time). Under the influence of Stančić and earlier cooperation with Štulić, the record announced the band's future shift towards new wave. The album featured a cover of Azra song "Jablan" and brought two large hits, "Ulične tuče" and the ballad "Stranica dnevnika" ("A Page from the Diary"). The songs from the album were recorded with English language lyrics and released by CBS Records on the album City Kids. Additionally, the album featured the English language version of the song "Predstavi je kraj" from the band's debut album, entitled "When the Show Is Done". On 7 January 1980, the band performed as Steam Roller in the Mian discoteque Odissea 2001.

At the end of 1980, the band released the album Vruće igre (Hot Games), joining in on the exuberant Yugoslav new wave scene. The album was, as the band's previous release, recorded in Milan, and was produced by Tini Varga. It featured new members, guitarist and saxophonist Rastko Milošev, bass guitarist Srećko Kukurić and drummer Paolo Sfeci; Zoran Cvetković had in the meantime left the band to form Parlament, and Stančić had moved to the band Film. Miksić would spend the following two years performing in West German clubs, also performing with the Zagreb-based cover band Cadillac, and in 1982, he drowned in the Sava river. Vruće igre album cover presented the band's new image – the members were dressed in black formal suits and wore skinny ties. It brought successful songs in trend with the popular new wave sound – ska-influenced "Neda", "Ona je tako prokleto mlada" ("She Is So Bloody Young") and "Javi se" ("Give Me a Call"), the latter featuring a musical quation from the hit "Needles and Pins". Hasanefendić paid tribute to Štulić by covering Azra song "Kad Miki kaže da se boji" ("When Mickey Says He'd Been Afraid"), and the album for the first time featured Hasanefendić on lead vocals, in the song "Ne udaraj me nisko" ("Don't Hit Me Low"). The album saw large commercial and critical success and launched the band to the top of the Yugoslav rock scene.

=== Shift to mainstream rock and new successes on the Yugoslav scene (1981–1991) ===
The band's long-awaited success with mass audience and the Yugoslav music critics brought by Vruće igre was followed by a series of albums. In 1981, they released the album Vrijeme je na našoj strani (Time Is On Our Side), once again produced by Tini Varga, but this time recorded in Sweden. The album featured a combination of 1960s pop music and 1980s rock sound, but also included The Platters- and doo wop-influenced "Kao ti" ("Like You"). The band repeated the successful formula of recording ballads, this time "Kao ti" and "Staška", alongside firm pop-influenced tracks, most prominently "Moje dnevne paranoje" ("My Daily Paranoias"). However, the band also paid homage to their boogie rock roots with the song "Djevojčice ne..." ("Girl, Don't..."). Vrijeme je na našoj strani was followed by the double live album Koncert (Concert), recorded on the group's concert in Zagreb's Dom Sportova hall.

On the album Glavnom ulicom (Down the Main Street), released in 1983, the band continued in the similar manner. Beside Hasanefendić's songs, the album featured tracks composed by Milošev and Kukurić. The album brought the hits "Kao prije" ("Like Before") and "Ma 'ajde / Gledaj stvari mojim očima" ("C'mon / Look at the Things from My Point Of View"). Hasanefendić recorded lead vocals for the acoustic ballad "A ja bih s vragom..." ("And I Would With the Devil..."). Saxophonist Miroslav Sedak and Novi Fosili keyboardist Rajko Dujmić made guest appearances on the album. After the album was released, Milošev went to serve his stint in the Yugoslav army, and was replaced on live performances by Vedran Božić.

Milošev returned to the band for the recording of their eight studio album, Uhvati ritam (Catch the Beat), released in 1984. The album featured one song authored by Milošev, "Ponovo sam" ("Alone Again"). The album featured guest appearance by keyboardist Zoran Kraš, and in the title track, which would go on to become a large hit, the backing vocals were sung by journalist Dražen Vrdoljak and Bajaga i Instruktori members Momčilo Bajagić and Dejan Cukić. The album Pokreni se! (Move Yourself!), released in 1985, featured guest appearances by Ekatarina Velika keyboardist Margita Stefanović, singer-songwriter Drago Mlinarec, who provided vocals for the song "Idu dani" ("Days Are Passing"), and saxophonist Miroslav Sedak. Hasanefendić recorded lead vocals for the song "Stojim već satima" ("I'm Standing for Hours"). After the release of the album, Milošev left the band and started a solo career, releasing the album Granice: Ras, 2va, 3ri' (Borders: One, 2wo, 3hree) in 1990.

In 1985, Rahimovski and Hasanefendić took part in the YU Rock Misija project, a Yugoslav contribution to Live Aid, contributing vocals to the song "Za Milion Godina". Zoran Cvetković returned to Parni Valjak, stepping into Milošev's place, and the new lineup recorded the band's second live album, E = mc², released in 1986. The album was recorded on the band's concert held in Dom Sportova on 26 February 1986, the performance featuring former Dorian Gray member Toni Ostojić on keyboards.

The band's following studio album, Anđeli se dosađuju? (Angels Are Bored?), was produced by Hasanefendić and Tomo in der Mühlen and released in 1987. The album was marked by heavier use of keyboards, played by guest musicians Koki Dimuševski (of Leb i Sol), Neven Frangeš and Stanko Juzbašić. The song "Anja" featured guest appearance by Lačni Franz frontman Zoran Predin on vocals. The album's main hit was the ballad "Jesen u meni" ("Autumn in Me"). At the beginning of 1988, the band released the VHS Koncert, with the recording of their concert held in Dom Sportova on 23 December 1987. On the VHS debuted a new member, keyboardist Miroslav Barbir. At the beginning of May 1988, the band held a large free concert in Zagreb's Republic Square, after which Hasanefendić announced a hiatus in the band's work.

The band returned to the scene in a new lineup, featuring bass guitarist Zorislav Preskavec (formerly of Patrola and Zvijezde), drummer Dražen Šolc (formerly of Obećanje Proljeća, Parlament, Film and Neki To Vole Vruće). The band's following album, Sjaj u očima (Glow in the Eyes), released it 1989, brought the hit ballad "Moja je pjesma lagana" ("My Song Is Slow"). The album also featured a cover of Drago Mlinarec song "Uvijek kada ostanem sam" ("Always When I Stay Alone"). After the album release, Cvetković moved to London, where he still resides, working as a studio musician. The band was joined by guitarist and saxophonist Bruno Kovačić and keyboardist Berislav Blažević, the new lineup appearing on the various artists live album ZG Rock Forces, released in 1989 and featuring live recordings of four most popular Zagreb bands at the time – Parni Valjak, Prljavo Kazalište, Film and Psihomodo Pop.

In 1990, Parni Valjak released the album Lovci snova (Dream Hunters), the title of which was inspired by Milorad Pavić's novel Dictionary of the Khazars. The album songs were written during 1990 in the Mokrice Castle, and the album recording was sponsored by the clothing company Levi's. The album brought successful songs "Suzama se vatre ne gase" ("You Can't Put Fires Out With Tears"), "Samo san" ("Only a Dream"), "Godine prolaze" ("Years Are Passing"), "Ima dana" ("There Are Days"). Following the album release, former Prljavo Kazalište member Marijan Brkić replaced Kovačić, who travelled to the United States for his musical specialization.

The band celebrated their 15th anniversary with a series of concerts in Dom Sportova. On their November and December 1990 concerts they recorded the material for the triple live album Svih 15 godina (All 15 Years), released in 1991. During the same year, they released the compilation albums Samo sjećanja (Only Memories).

=== New successes in independent Croatia, disbandment (1992–2005) ===
In 1992, the band released the compilation album Pusti nek' traje, kolekcija vol. 1 (Let It Last, Collection Vol. 1), and appeared on the various artists album Rock za Hrvatsku (Rock for Croatia) with the song "Kekec je slobodan, red je na nas" ("Kekec Is Free, It's Our Turn Now"), alluding to Slovenia's declaration of independence.

At the end of 1993, the band released their thirteenth studio album, entitled Buđenje (Awakening). Buđenje was the band's first release to feature songs composed by Brkić. The album was promoted by a large concert in Dom Sportova in front of 15,000 spectators. The concert, as well as follow up concerts, featured Dado Topić as guest. At the beginning of 1995, the band won seven Porin Awards, including the Album of the Year Award for Buđenje, Song of the Year Award for "Sve još miriše na nju" ("Everything Still Smells of Her"), and the Best Cover Art Award for Buđenje cover art, and Rahimovski's and Topić's duet "Molitva" ("Prayer"), released on the album of Christmas songs Mir na zemlji (Peace on Earth) in 1994, received the Best Vocal Collaboration Award. In June 1995, on their unplugged concert in Zagreb Youth Theatre (Zagrebačko Kazalište Mladih – ZKM), the band recorded the live album Bez struje – Live in ZeKaEm (Unplugged – Live from ZKM). The album, featuring a large number of guest musicians, was excellently received by the audience.

In 1997, Parni Valjak released the album Samo snovi teku uzvodno (Only the Dreams Flow Upstream). The album included a Croatian language cover of Martin Krpan song "To ni političen song" ("This Is Not a Political Song"), entitled "Ovo nije politički song" and featuring guest appearance by former Martin Krpan frontman Vlado Kreslin. The song "Dok je tebe" ("As Long as There's You") featured guest appearance by singer Tina Rupčić, and the song "...A gdje je ljubav" ("...And Where Is Love") featured Croatian Radiotelevision Symphony Orchestra. The album release was marked by ambitious promotion, with the band travelling by airplane to visit Pula, Rijeka, Split, Osijek and Zagreb in one day, and with the songs "Kaži ja (Boje jeseni)" ("Say Me (Colors of Autumn)") and "Sai Baba Blues" being released on mini CD.

The band marked their 25th anniversary with the release of the studio album Zastave (Flags). In the album lyrics, Hasanefendić made numerous references to the band's earlier works. However, the band also experimented with different genres with neo-psychedelic "Sanjam" ("I'm Dreaming"), Tex-Mex-oriented "Zapjevaj" ("Start Singing") and Latin music-influenced "Kad kola krenu..." ("When the Cart Starts Moving..."). As a part of 25th anniversary celebration, the band also held a large concert in Zagreb's Dom Sportova, featuring most of Parni Valjak former members. On the concert debuted the band's new bass guitarist Zvonimir Bučević, replacing Zorislav Preskavec, who had become the cultural attaché in Croatian embassy in Ljubljana. The concert recording was released in 2002 on the DVD Live – Zagreb, Dom sportova 2. XII 2000.. In the meantime, the band had released the double live album Kao nekada / Live at S.C. (As Once / Live at S.C.), recorded on their concerts held in Zagreb's Student Center on 31 May and 1 June 2001. The concerts featured a brass section and a number of guests, including singers Nina Badrić, Tina Rupčić, Elvira Happ (formerly of Stidljiva Ljubičica), Oliver Dragojević, Drago Mlinarec and Davor Gobac (of Psihomodo Pop).

In 2004, the band released the album Pretežno sunčano? (Mostly Sunny?). The album featured Tina Rupčić on backing vocals. A year later, they released the DVD Bez struje – Live in ZeKaeM, featuring a video recording of their 1995 unplugged performance in Zagreb Youth Theatre, accompanied by the reissue of the live album with three bonus tracks. The band marked their 30th anniversary with a concert held on Ban Jelačić Square in Zagreb on the 2005 New Year's Eve. After the concert, the members of the band announced that they had agreed to split up.

Following the disbanment, Rahimovski released his only solo album, U vremenu izgubljenih (In the Time of the Lost), in 2007, with most of the songs written by Dražen Šolc. Bučević also recorded a solo album, Eclipse, released in 2006 and featuring mostly instrumental themes. Brkić and Blažević recorded an album of Christmas songs, entitled Božićni san (Christmas Dream). In 2006, Brkić joined Gibonni's backing band, and in 2007 released the solo album Bolji svijet (Better World), featuring his songs performed by several guest vocalists: Rahimovski, Tina Rupčić, Gibonni, Oliver Dragojević, Dado Topić, Massimo Savić, Toni Cetinski and others.

The band's original drummer Srećko Antonioli died on 19 May 2006.

=== Reunion, Rahimovski's death (2009–2022) ===
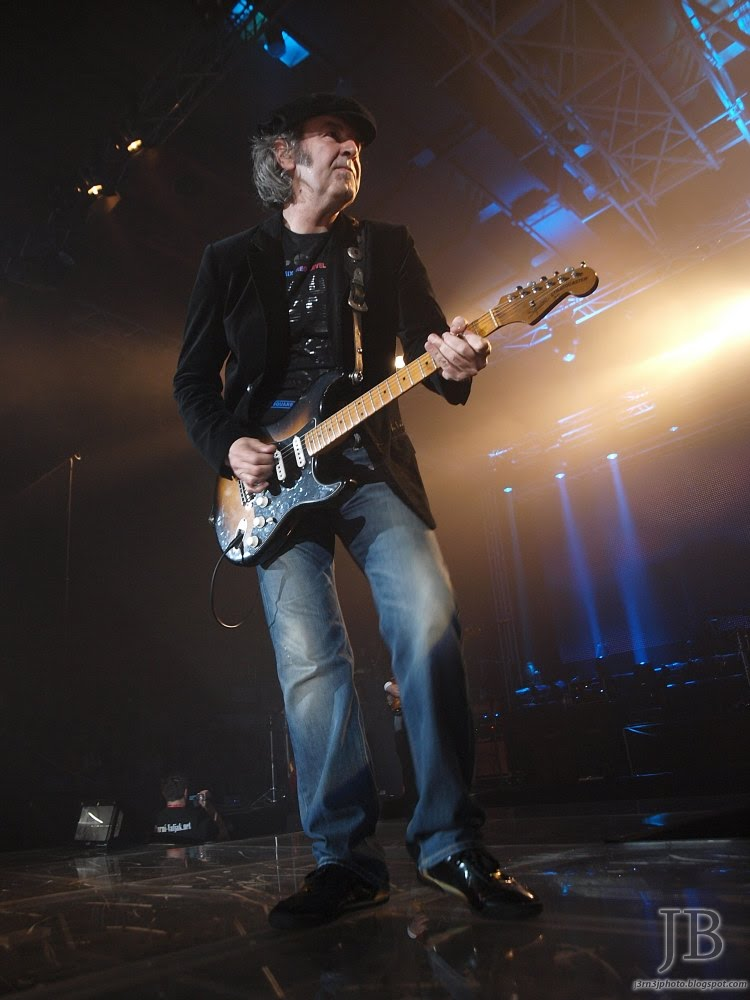
Husein Hasanefendić "Hus" performing with Parni Valjak in 2010

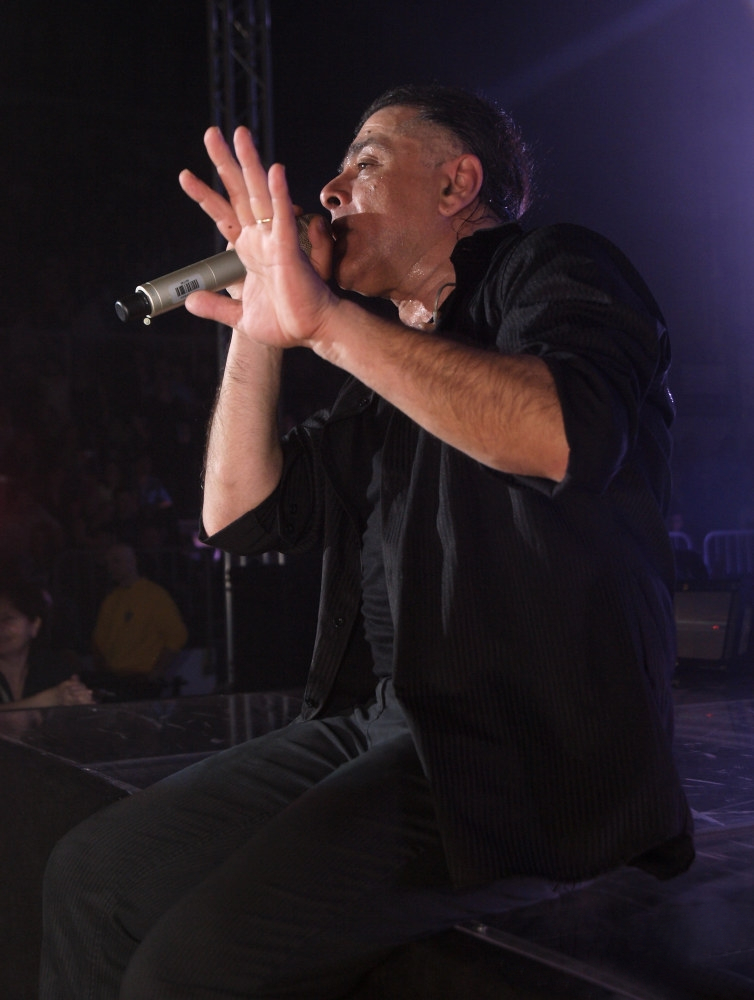
Aki Rahimovski performing with Parni Valjak in 2010

The band returned to the scene in 2009, in the lineup featuring Hasanefendić, Rahimovski, Brkić, Preskavec, Blažević and the drummer Dalibor Marinković. They held a series of concerts during 2009, and in 2010, after 25 years, the band performed in Belgrade, holding two concerts at Belgrade Arena, on 16 and 17 October, with approximately 22,000 spectators per concerts. The recordings from the concert were released on the DVD Live Beogradska arena (Live Belgrade Arena). In March 2012, the band held five sold-out unplugged concerts in Belgrade's Sava Centar.

The group's seventeenth studio album Stvarno nestvarno (Really Unreal) was not available for sale and was released in digital format only. It was available for free download from the band's official website via bar code printed on the tickets for the band's concerts. The deluxe compilation album Nema predaje (No Surrender), released in 2013, featured part of the songs from Stvarno nestvarno, new tracks, a disc with live recordings from concerts in Zagreb Arena and Sava Centar, as well as the DVD Iz rupe bez šminke (Out of the Hole with No Makeup), with recordings from the band's rehearsals. As a part of celebration of 2013 enlargement of the European Union, the band performed in Wrocław, Poland on 29 June 2013. The band's former guitarist and saxophonist Rastko Milošev died on 12 September 2014.

In 2015, the band was awarded the City of Zagreb Award for "highest merits in promoting [the city's] social life, and marked their 40th anniversary by releasing box sets Original Album Collection Vol. 1, featuring four studio albums from the 1980s and the live album E = mc², and Original Album Collection Vol. 2, featuring five studio albums from the 1990s and early 2000s and the live album Bez struje – Live in ZeKaeM. The releases were followed by a series of concerts. In Split they held a concert at Prokurative square, and in Belgrade they held two concerts – an unplugged one on 27 November in Sava Centar, and an electric one on 28 November in Ranko Žeravica Sports Hall. They performed the same acoustic and electric sets in Zagreb's Dom Sportova on 28 and 29 December 2015. In the summer of 2016, they performed in the sold-out Pula Arena and Split Spaladium Arena. In 2017, they released the four-piece box set Antologija (Anthology), with their old songs split into four discs in accordance with their sound – Baladerstvo (Ballading), Iskoraci (Stepping Out), Rockologija (Rockology) and Popistika (Popistics). The box set featured a booklet with rare photographs and texts about the band written by Siniša Škarica, Zlatko Gall and Gregor Bžožovič. The double Blu-ray release Live in Pula featured the recording of their 12 August 2016 concert in Pula Arena. As a bonus, the release featured five songs from the band's 2015 acoustic and electric performances held in Dom Sportova.

The band's latest studio album, entitled Vrijeme (Time) and released in 2018, had the transience of time as its main theme. The album was produced by Hasanefendić and Brkić. The song "Kad nemaš kud" ("When You Don't Have Where to Go") featured the band's long-time backing vocalists Tina Krestnik on lead vocals.

Aki Rahimovski died on 22 January 2022. He was buried at the Mirogoj Cemetery Alley of the Greats. On the day of his burial at 3:00PM, over 50 radio stations in former Yugoslav republics broadcast the band's last song recorded with Rahimovski, "Ponovo" ("Again"). The compilation album Vrijeme ljubavi (Time of Love), released during the same year, featured their old singles and the song "Ponovo".

=== Tribute to Rahimovski, new activities with new vocalist (2022–present) ===
On 26 March 2022, Parni Valjak held a tribute concert to Rahimovski in Zagreb Arena with a number of guest musicians. The entire concert, entitled Dovoljno je reći... Aki (It's Enough to Say... Aki), was released on streaming media. In 2022, Rahimovski was posthumously awarded the Porin Lifetime Achievement Award.

At the beginning of 2023, the band announced that they are continuing their activity with new vocalist, Igor Drvenkar, releasing the new single "Moja glava, moja pravila" ("My Head, My Rules").

== Legacy ==
Parni Valjak songs "Neda" and "Vrijeme je na našoj strani" was covered by Yugoslav girl group Aska on their 1982 album Disco Rock. "Godine prolaze" was covered by Croatian and Yugoslav country music band Plava Trava Zaborava on their 1999 live album 16 Nam Je Godina Tek – Koncert (We're Only 16 – Concert), Rahimovski making a guest appearance in the song. Serbian and Yugoslav rock singer Viktorija covered Parni Valjak songs "Molitva" and "'Ajde igraj" ("C'mon Dance") on her 2000 album Nostalgija (Nostalgia). Croatian pop singer Vanna recorded a cover of "Stranica dnevnika" on her 2007 album Ledeno doba (Ice Age), Hasanefendić and Rahimovski making guest appearances in the song. The song "Uhvati ritam" was covered on the 2001 album Yugoton, featuring covers of songs by Yugoslav rock acts recorded by Polish musicians. The Polish version of the song "Zastave" was recorded on the album Yugopolis – Stoneczna strona miasta (Yugopolis – Sunny Side of the Street), and was later used by Polish politician, singer and actor Paweł Kukiz in his 2015 presidential campaign.

In 1998, the album Anđeli se dosađuju? was polled No. 82 on the list of 100 Greatest Albums of Yugoslav Popular Music in the book YU 100: najbolji albumi jugoslovenske rok i pop muzike (YU 100: The Best albums of Yugoslav pop and rock music). In 1987, in YU legende uživo (YU Legends Live), a special publication by Rock magazine, Koncert was proclaimed one of 12 best Yugoslav live albums.

In 2000, "Sve još miriše na nju" was polled No. 22, "Jesen u meni" was polled No. 48, "Stranica dnevnika" was polled No. 57 and "Hvala ti" ("Thank You") was polled No. 85 on the Rock Express Top 100 Yugoslav Rock Songs of All Times list. In 2006, "Uhvati ritam" was polled No. 68 and "Stranica dnevnika" was polled No. 96 on the B92 Top 100 Domestic Songs list.

In 2015, the group was awarded the City of Zagreb Award for "highest merits in promoting [the city's] social life. In 2022, Rahimovski was posthumously awarded the Porin Lifetime Achievement Award.

== Members ==
=== Current members ===
- Husein Hasanefendić "Hus" – guitar (1975–2005, 2009–present)
- Zorislav Preskavec – bass guitar (1988–2000, 2009–present)
- Berislav Blažević – keyboards (1989–2005, 2009–present)
- Marijan Brkić – guitar (1990–2005, 2009–present)
- Dalibor Marinković – drums (2009–present)
- Igor Drvenkar – vocals (2022–present)

=== Former members ===
- Jurica Pađen – guitar (1975–1978)
- Aki Rahimovski – vocals (1975–2005, 2009–2022)
- Zlatko Miksić "Fuma" – bass guitar (1975–1980)
- Srećko Antonioli – drums (1975–1978)
- Branimir "Johnny" Štulić – guitar (1979)
- Zoran Cvetković – guitar (1979–1980, 1985–1989)
- Ivan "Piko" Stančić – drums (1979–1980)
- Rastko Milošev – guitar, saxophone (1980–1983, 1984–1985)
- Srećko Kukurić – bass guitar (1980–1988)
- Paolo Sfeci – drums (1980–1988)
- Miroslav Barbir – keyboards (1987–1988)
- Dražen Šolc – drums (1988–2005)
- Bruno Kovačić – guitar, saxophone (1989–1990)
- Zvonimir Bučević – bass guitar (2000–2005)

== Discography ==
=== Studio albums ===
- Dođite na show! (1976)
- Glavom kroz zid (1977)
- Gradske priče (1979)
- City Kids (as Steam Roller, 1980)
- Vruće igre (1980)
- Vrijeme je na našoj strani (1981)
- Glavnom ulicom (1983)
- Uhvati ritam (1984)
- Pokreni se! (1985)
- Anđeli se dosađuju? (1987)
- Sjaj u očima (1988)
- Lovci snova (1990)
- Buđenje (1993)
- Samo snovi teku uzvodno (1997)
- Zastave (2000)
- Pretežno sunčano? (2004)
- Stvarno nestvarno (2011)
- Vrijeme (2018)
- Kažu pčele umiru... (2025)

=== Live albums ===
- Koncert (1982)
- E = mc² (1985)
- Svih 15 godina (1990)
- Bez struje – Live in ZeKaeM (1995)
- Kao nekada / Live at S.C. (2001)
- Dovoljno je reći... Aki (2022)

=== Compilation albums ===
- Parni Valjak (1985)
- Samo sjećanja (1991)
- Pusti nek' traje, kolekcija vol. 1 (1991)
- Najveći hitovi (1997)
- Balade(1998)
- Koncentrat 1977.-1983. (2005)
- Koncentrat 1984.-2005. (2005)
- The Ultimate Collection (2009)
- Najljepše ljubavne pjesme (2010)
- The Best Of (2010)
- Nema predaje (2013)
- Greatest Hits Collection (2017)
- Vrijeme ljubavi (2022)

=== Box sets ===
- Original Album Collection Vol. 1 (2015)
- Original Album Collection Vol. 2 (2015)
- Antologija (2017)

=== Video albums ===
- Koncert (1988)
- Live – Zagreb, Dom sportova 2. XII 2000. (2002)
- Bez struje – Live in ZeKaeM (2005)
- Live Beogradska arena (2011)
- Live in Pula (2017)

=== Singles ===
- "Parni valjak" / "Šizofrenik" (1976)
- "Tako prođe tko ne pazi kad ga Parni valjak zgazi / "Dok si mlad" (1976)
- "Ljubavni jadi jednog Parnog valjka" / "Teško je biti sam" (1976)
- "Prevela me mala žednog preko vode" / "O šumama, rijekama i pticama" (1976)
- "'Oću da se ženim" / "Ljeto" (1977)
- "Lutka za bal" / "Crni dani" (1977)
- "Od motela do motela" / "Predstavi je kraj (u živo)" (1978)
- "Stranica dnevnika" / "Ulične tuče" (1979)
- "Motel to Motel" / "When the Show Is Done" (1979)
- "Neda" / "Hvala ti" (1981)
- "Moje dnevne paranoje" / "Ona je tako prokleto mlada" (1982)
- "Uhvati ritam" / "Samo ona zna" (1984)
- "Kekec je slobodan, red je na nas" (1991)
- "Kaži ja (Boje jeseni)" / "Sai Baba Blues" (1997)
- "Tko nam brani" / "Dok si pored mene" (2002)

==== Charted singles ====
Title	Year	Peak chart positions	Album
Title	Year	CRO	Album
"Moja glava, moja pravila" (with Igor Drvenkar)	2023	1	Non-album single
"Bogati će pobjeći na Mars" (with Igor Drvenkar)	2023	6	Non-album single
"—" denotes releases that did not chart or were not released in that territory.
