= Aerodrom (band) =

Yugoslav, now Croatian, rock music group

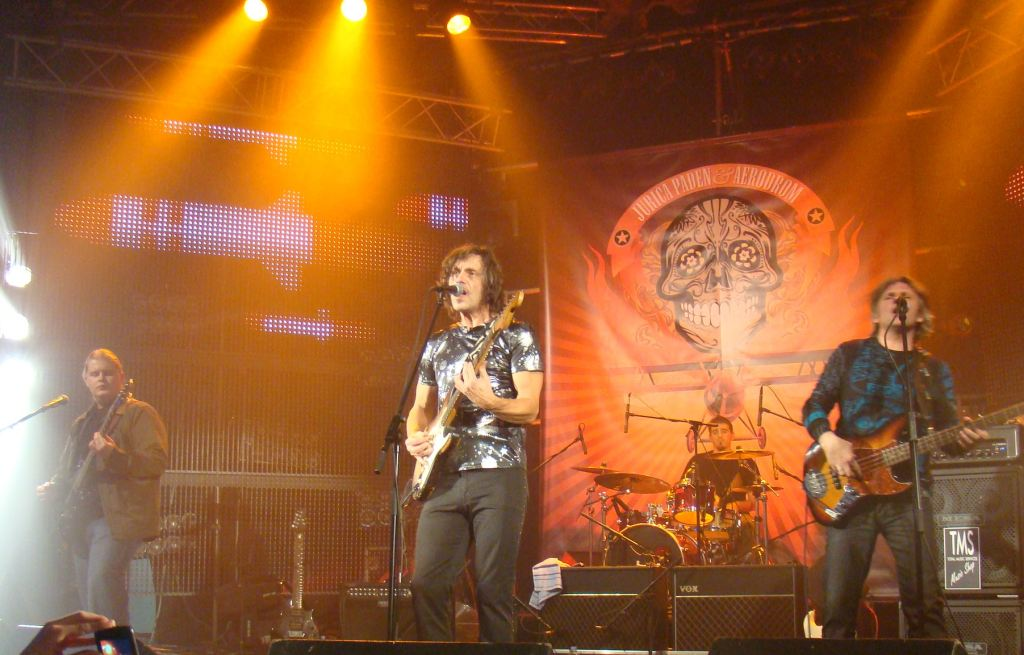
- Jurica Pađen & Aerodrom performing in Zagreb in 2009

Background information
- Also known as: Jurica Pađen & Aerodrom
- Origin: Zagreb, Croatia
- Genres: Progressive rock (early); new wave; rock; pop rock
- Years active: 1978–1987; 2000–present
- Labels: Jugoton, Croatia Records, Menart
- Members: Jurica Pađen; Tomislav Šojat; Ivan Havidić; Damir Medić
- Past members: Zlatan Živković; Remo Krstanović Cartagine; Paolo Sfeci; Mladen Krajnik; Branko Knežević; Zoran Kraš; Nenad Smoljanović; Alen Bjelinski; Slavko Pintarić

Aerodrom (lit. 'Airport') is a Croatian and Yugoslav rock band formed in Zagreb in 1978. Formed and led by guitarist, vocalist and principal songwriter Jurica "Jura" Pađen, Aerodrom was a popular act of the Yugoslav rock scene.

The group was formed by guitarist Jurica Pađen, who had already gained prominence as a member of Grupa 220 and Parni Valjak. The first lineup featured, beside Pađen, vocalist Zlatan Živković, bass guitarist Remo Krstanović Cartagine, drummer Paolo Sfeci and keyboardist Mladen Krajnik. Initially, the band performed progressive rock, their 1979 debut Kad misli mi vrludaju bringing them attention of the public and the media. With the 1981 album Tango Bango, the group turned towards simpler, new wave-influenced sound, scoring several hits. After the album release, Živković left the band and the vocal duties were taken over by Pađen. Aerodrom's third studio album Obične ljubavne pjesme, released in 1983, was their biggest commercial success. It was followed by two more successful pop rock-oriented albums, the last one recorded in the lineup featuring Pađen on guitar and vocals, Cartagine on bass guitar and Živković—who had returned to the band in 1986—on vocals and drums. The group disbanded in 1987, Pađen continuing his career as guitarist in the highly popular band Azra. In 1993, he formed his Pađen Band, releasing three albums with the group, before reforming Aerodrom in 2000. The group has released four studio albums since, with the 2007 album Rock @ Roll being the band's first release to feature Pađen as the sole remaining original member. Since its release the group has been performing under the name Jurica Pađen & Aerodrom.

== History ==
=== Formation and progressive rock beginnings (1978–1980) ===
Aerodrom leader Jurica "Jura" Pađen started his career in 1970, at the age of 15, as the guitarist for Zoo Band, later performing with the bands Spectrum and Hobo. In 1972, he joined popular band Grupa 220, at the time comprising vocalist Drago Mlinarec, guitarist Husein Hasanefendić "Hus", drummer Ivan "Piko" Stančić, and bass guitarist Nenad Zubak. With the group, Pađen recorded their second and last studio album Slike (Images), released in 1975. After the group disbanded during the same year, Pađen and Hasanefendić formed Parni Valjak with vocalist Aki Rahimovski, bass guitarist Zlatko Miksić "Fuma" and drummer Srećko Antonioli. With Parni Valjak, Pađen recorded two studio albums, the band's 1976 debut Dođite na show! (Come to the Show!) and the 1977 album Glavom kroz zid (Head Against the Wall). In 1978, both Hasanefendić and Rahimovski were drafted to serve their mandatory stints in the Yugoslav People's Army, Parni Valjak going on hiatus and Pađen deciding to form a new band.

Pađen formed Aerodrom in 1978 with vocalist Zlatan Živković (previously a drummer for less-known Zagreb bands), bass guitarist Remo Krstanović Cartagine, drummer Paolo Sfeci (former member of Balkan Sevdah Band) and keyboardist Mladen Krajnik (formerly of Grupa Marina Škrgatića, Grupa 220 and Divlje Jagode). Prior to hiring Živković, Pađen considered little-known Jura Stublić (later of Film fame) as Aerodrom's vocalist, but gave up on the idea due to Stublić's deep vocals. Pađen got the inspiration for the band's name from his relationship with a stewardess.

Initially, Aerodrom performed progressive rock. On the 1978 edition of BOOM Festival, the band had their first notable performance, during which Pađen was hit in the head by a bottle thrown from the audience. During the following year, the band held a large number of concerts across Yugoslavia, and in September they performed as one of the opening bands on Bijelo Dugme's Rock Spectacle at the JNA Stadium in Belgrade. The band made their first demos with the help from former Time guitarist Vedran Božić, managing to secure a contract with Jugoton record label. The band's debut album, entitled Kad misli mi vrludaju (When My Thoughts Are Wandering), was produced by Božić and released at the end of 1979. Although released at the time when Yugoslav progressive rock scene saw its decline due to expansion of Yugoslav punk rock and new wave scene, the band managed to gain the attention of the audience, mostly owing to the title track and "Kraj tebe u tami" ("Next to You in the Darkness"), the latter later covered by Azra, and for the album the band was awarded a special acknowledgement by SR Croatia's Commission for Culture. After Paolo Sfeci left the band to join Parni Valjak, Aerodrom's new drummer became former Nepočin member Branko Knežević.

=== Switch to new wave (1981) ===
The band's following album, entitled Tango Bango, was recorded in 1981 in Milan and produced by Piko Stančić. Influenced by the new, exuberant new wave scene, with songs authored by Pađen, Krajnik and Cartagine, Tango Bango brought radiophonic pop rock-oriented sound. Pađen debuted as vocalist in the song "Djevojke" ("Girls"). The songs "Stavi pravu stvar" ("Put the Right Thing"), "Dobro se zabavljaj" ("Have a Lot of Fun") and "Tvoje lice" ("Your Face") became radio hits and provided the band with frequent performances. Soon after the album release, Krajnik left the band to serve his mandatory stint in the Yugoslav army, and was replaced by Zoran Kraš, formerly of the band Stakleno Zvono (Bell Jar). Soon after, Živković also left the band, and vocal duties were taken over by Pađen.

=== Pađen taking over the vocals, biggest commercial success, disbandment (1982–1987) ===
In 1982, the band released their third studio album, entitled Obične ljubavne pjesme (Ordinary Love Songs). The album was recorded in Sweden and produced by Tini Varga, who also played guitar and sang backing vocals on the album recording. The album also featured guest appearance by long-time ABBA collaborator Ulf Andersson on saxophone. The album brought the biggest hit in the band's career, "Obična ljubavna pjesma" ("Ordinary Love Song"), and was followed by a successful promotional tour which included concerts in Sarajevo's Youth Centre Skenderija, Belgrade's Tašmajdan Stadium, and Zagreb's Kulušić club and Moša Pijade Hall. Following Obične ljubavne pesme promotional tour, the band went on hiatus due to Pađen's mandatory army stint.

After Pađen's return from the army, in the spring of 1984, Pađen and Cartagine accepted invitation from Azra leader Branimir "Johnny" Štulić to join Azra for the spring tour. After the tour ended, Pađen, Cartagine and drummer Nenad Smoljanović recorded Aerodrom's fourth studio album, Dukat i pribadače (Ducat and Pins). The album was produced by Novi Fosili vocalist and keyboardist Rajko Dujmić, who also played keyboards on the album recording. It brought the hits "Fratello", "24 sata" ("24 Hours") and "Digni me visoko" ("Lift Me High"), but also politically-related songs "Laž" ("Lie") and "Daj neku lovu" ("Give Some Money"). The band negotiated with former Time and September keyboardist Tihomir "Pop" Asanović to join them on promotional concerts, but eventually went on tour with pianist and conductor Alen Bjelinski playing the keyboards.

After Dukat i pribadače tour, Bjelinski joined the newly-formed band Limeni Bubanj (Tin Drum), so the band once again started album recording as a trio. Zlatan Živković returned to the band to replace Smoljanović, but also provided vocals for some of the songs. The album was entitled Trojica u mraku (Three Man in the Dark), after 1936 comic by Andrija Maurović. The album was produced by Pađen, and featured guest appearances by Laza Ristovski (keyboards), Miroslav Sedak Benčić (saxophone), Ante Dropuljić (trumpet) and Herbert Stencel (trombone). The album songs dealt with diverse topics – in "Zagreb, Ljubljana i Beograd" ("Zagreb, Ljubljana and Belgrade") Pađen criticized rock critics, "Eat a Shit" was filled with disappointment and anger and "Pozdrav sa Bardo ravni" ("Greetings from Bardo Plains") was philosophical.

In 1987, Živković moved to Australia, and Aerodrom ended their activity. At the end of the 1980s, Pađen and Cartagine, with former Azra and Haustor drummer Boris Leiner and other musicians, held several live performance under the name Aerodrom, but without ambition to reestablish the band.

=== Post breakup (1987–2001) ===
After Aerodrom disbanded, Pađen rejoined Azra, recording the 1987 studio album Između krajnosti (Between Extremes) and the 1988 live album Zadovoljština (Satisfaction) with the group, also participating in the recording of Branimir Štulić's solo albums Balkanska rapsodija (Balkan Rhapsody, 1989) and Balegari ne vjeruju sreći (Dung Beetles Don't Believe in Luck, 1989). Pađen performed with Azra until the band's last concert, held on 15 August 1990 at Hvar.

In 1991, at the time of Croatian War of Independence, Pađen recorded the song "Tko to tamo gine" ("Who's That Dying Over There") for the various artists album Moja domovina (My Homeland), and a cover of Azra's "Balkan" entitled "Papan" (the title being a slang for an immature boy) for the various artists album Rock za Hrvatsku (Rock for Croatia). During war years, Pađen joined Croatian musicians who performed for Croatian troops.

In 1993, he formed his Pađen Band, recording the album Hamburger City. The album brought the hit song "Što si u kavu stavila" ("What Did You Put in My Coffee"), featuring a musical quotation from "Don't Let Me Be Misunderstood". Pađen Band recorded two more studio albums, the 1995 Slatka mala stvar (Cute Little Thing) and the 1997 Izbrisani grafiti (Erased Graffiti), the latter bringing the hits "Otkazani let" ("Cancelled Flight") and "Nevolja" ("Trouble"). The song "Samo da me draga ne ostavi" ("I Only Hope My Darling Won't Leave Me") from the album would receive large attention in 2020, with Croatian Composers' Society issuing a statement about "striking resemblance" between the song and Paul McCartney's 2018 song "Confidante" and speculations about Pađen suing McCartney appearing in Croatian media.

=== Reunion and new releases (2000–present) ===
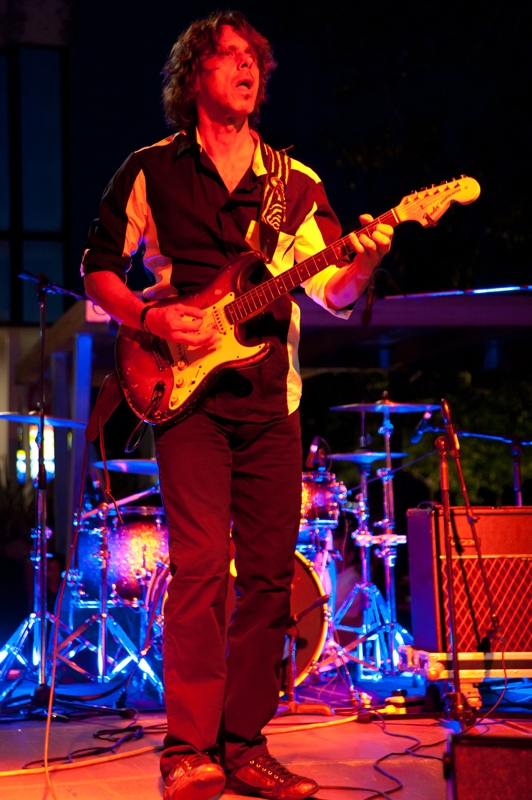
Jurica Pađen performing with Aerodrom in Crikvenica in 2013

In 2000, following the release of the Pađen Band compilation album Retro 16, Pađen reformed Aerodrom. The new lineup of Aerodrom featured Pađen on vocals and guitar, Mladen Krajnik on keyboards, Tomislav Šojat (formerly of the bands Prva Ljubav and Regata) on bass guitar, and Zlatan Živković on drums. The new lineup released the comeback album Na travi (On the Grass) in 2001. All the songs on the album were authored by Pađen, with "A do Splita pet" ("And Five More to Split") and "Badnja noć" ("Christmas Night") becoming hits. In 2003, Pađen released his solo album Žicanje (Wiring), featuring his instrumentals inspired by 1960s music, with Šojat and Aerodrom former bass guitarist Remo Krstanović Cartagine taking part in the recording. The album was awarded with Fender Award for the Best Croatian Instrumental Album. Simultaneously, Pađen formed the supergroup 4 Asa (4 Aces) with Vlado Kalember, Alen Islamović and Rajko Dujmić, releasing two studio albums, one live album and one video album with the band, all releases consisting of new versions of the band members' old songs.

In 2007, Pađen, Šojat and new drummer Slavko Pintarić "Pišta" (formerly of Srebrna Krila) recorded the album Rock @ Roll, the first album to feature Pađen as the sole remaining original member of Aerodrom and the first to be released under Jurica Pađen & Aerodrom moniker. Alongside Pađen's new songs, the album featured the old song "Fait Accompli", co-written by Pađen and Branimir Štulić and dedicated to John Lennon. In 2009, the band released their first live album, Hitovi i legende (Hits and Legends). The album was recorded on Jurica Pađen & Aerodrom concert in Tvornica kulture club in Zagreb held on 13 December 2008, and featured, alongside Aerodrom and Pađen Band songs, the songs of other Zagreb bands the members of the group played with.

Since 2009, the band performs in the lineup featuring Pađen, Šojat, Ivan Havidić (guitar) and Damir Medić (drums). The lineup recorded the 2012 studio album Taktika noja (Ostrich Tactics), which brought the hits "Loše volje" ("In a Bad Mood"), "Ostani" ("Stay") and "Duh je nestao" ("The Spirit Is Gone"). In 2014, Pađen released the solo album All Stars, featuring instrumental tracks he recorded with Branimir Štulić, Husein Hasanefendić, Massimo Savić, Vedran Božić, Neno Belan, Zele Lipovača and Nikša Bratoš. In 2018, Croatia Records released the box set The Original Album Collection featuring reissues of the first five studio albums by Aerodrom. In 2019, Jurica Pađen & Aerodrom released their latest studio album, Dnevni rituali (Everyday Rituals), with hippie movement–inspired song "Sunce mi se smije" ("The Sun Is Laughing at Me") becoming a hit.

== Legacy ==
Aerodrom song "Obična ljubavna pesma" was covered, under the title "Gdy Miasto Śpi (Snem Kamiennym)" ("When the City Sleeps (Dead Asleep)"), on the 2001 album Yugoton, featuring covers of songs of Yugoslav rock acts by Polish musicians. The same song was covered by the Croatian world music band Postolar Tripper on their 2007 album Zamisli život u ritmu cipela za ples (Imagine a Life in the Rhythm of Dancing Shoes). Croatian singer Marko Tolja and Croatian Radiotelevision Jazz Orchestra recorded a swing cover of Aerodrom song "Stavi pravu stvar", releasing it on the album of the same title in 2017.

In 2000, "Fratello" was polled No.87 on the Rock Express Top 100 Yugoslav Rock Songs of All Times list.

== Members ==
Current members

- Jurica "Jura" Pađen – guitar (1978–1987, 2000–present), vocals (1982–1987, 2000–present)
- Tomislav Šojat – bass guitar (2000–present)
- Ivan Havidić – guitar (2009–present)
- Damir Medić – drums (2009–present)

Past members

- Zlatan Živković – vocals (1978–1982, 1986–1987), drums (1986–1987, 2000–2005)
- Remo Krstanović Cartagine – bass guitar (1978–1987)
- Paolo Sfeci – drums (1978–1980)
- Mladen Krajnik – keyboards (1978–1981, 2000–2005)
- Branko Knežević – drums (1980–1984)
- Zoran Kraš – keyboards (1981–1984)
- Nenad Smoljanović – drums (1984–1986)
- Alen Bjelinski – keyboards (1984)
- Slavko Pintarić "Pišta" – drums (2005–2009)

== Discography ==
=== Studio albums ===
- Kad misli mi vrludaju (1979)
- Tango bango (1981)
- Obične ljubavne pjesme (1982)
- Dukat i pribadače (1984)
- Trojica u mraku (1986)
- Na travi (2001)
- Rock @ Roll (2007)
- Taktika noja (2012)
- Dnevni rituali (2019)

=== Live albums ===
- Hitovi i legende (2009)

=== Compilations ===
- Flash Back 1979-1986 (1996)
- The Ultimate Collection (2008)
- Greatest Hits (2020)

=== Box Sets ===
- The Original Album Collection (2018)
