= YU 100: najbolji albumi jugoslovenske rok i pop muzike =

1998 book

- Author: Duško Antonić, Danilo Štrbac
- Language: Serbian
- Published: 1998 (YU Rock Press)
- Publication place: FR Yugoslavia
- Pages: 104 pages
- OCLC: 81276585

YU 100: najbolji albumi jugoslovenske rok i pop muzike (transl. "YU 100: the Greatest Yugoslav Rock and Pop Music Albums") is a book by Duško Antonić and Danilo Štrbac, published in 1998. It features a list of top 100 former Yugoslav popular music albums, formed according to the poll of 70 Serbian music critics, journalists, artists and others.

== Top 20 ==
#	Album	Artist	Year
1.	Odbrana i poslednji dani	Idoli	1982
2	Paket aranžman	Idoli, Šarlo Akrobata, Električni Orgazam	1981
3	Time	Time	1972
4	Korni Grupa	Korni Grupa	1972
5.	Azra	Azra	1980
6	Sunčana strana ulice	Azra	1981
7.	Pljuni istini u oči	Buldožer	1975
8.	Filigranski pločnici	Azra	1982
9	Dnevnik jedne ljubavi	Josipa Lisac	1973
10.	Bitanga i princeza	Bijelo Dugme	1979
11.	Bistriji ili tuplji čovek biva kad...	Šarlo Akrobata	1981
12.	Indexi	Indexi	1974
13.	Sa druge strane jastuka	Bajaga i Instruktori	1985
14.	Kad bi' bio bijelo dugme	Bijelo Dugme	1974
15.	Probaj me	Oliver Mandić	1981
16.	Kost u grlu	Riblja Čorba	1979
17.	Šta bi dao da si na mom mjestu	Bijelo Dugme	1975
18.	Partibrejkers I	Partibrejkers	1985
19.	Mrtva priroda	Riblja Čorba	1981
20.	Treći svijet	Haustor	1984

== Statistics ==
=== Artists with the most albums ===
- 8 – Bijelo Dugme
- 8 – Riblja Čorba
- 5 – Azra
- 4 – Bajaga i Instruktori
- 4 – Film
- 4 – Haustor
- 4 – Leb i Sol
- 4 – Idoli (including the split album Paket aranžman)
- 3 – Đorđe Balašević (including the album Mojoj mami umesto maturske slike u izlogu by his band Rani Mraz)
- 3 – Disciplina Kičme

=== Record labels by the number of albums ===
- 47 – Jugoton
- 28 – PGP-RTB
- 12 – ZKP RTLJ
- 7 – Helidon
- 2 – Diskoton
- 2 – Suzy
- 2 – Alta
- 1 – Carlo Records

=== Producers with the most albums ===
- 4 – Goran Bregović, Saša Habić, Kornelije Kovač, Enco Lesić, Ivo Umek, Ivan "Piko" Stančić, Branimir "Džoni" Štulić
- 3 – Boris Bele, Nikola Borota, Neil Harrison, John McCoy, Dave Cook and Anthony David, Dušan Kojić "Koja", Josip Boček
- 2 – Srđan Gojković "Gile", Husein Hasanefendić "Hus", Stipica Kalođera, Vanja Lisak, Milivoje "Mića" Marković, Đorđe Petrović, Petar J. Mac Taggart, Tihomir "Tini" Varga

== Voters ==
The voters were music critics, journalists, artists closely associated to the former Yugoslav popular music scene, and others. There are only several musicians among them. Each of them suggested ten former Yugoslav popular music albums he considers the greatest, and the second part of the book features short biographies of every one of them, and each one's choice of ten albums. The list was completed according to their suggestions. The voters were:

- David Albahari – writer, translator, rock journalist
- Duško Antonić – writer, one of the book authors
- Bane Antović – art editor, one of the founders of the Music Television of Serbia
- Zorica Bajin-Đukanović – art photographer, writer
- Svetislav Basara – writer, former rock musician
- Isidora Bjelica-Pajkić – writer, rock journalist
- Miša Blam – jazz musician and composer
- Mirjana Bobić-Mojsilović – journalist, writer
- Jovan Ćirilov – one of the founders of BITEF, manager of Yugoslav Drama Theatre, writer, journalist
- Srđan Dragojević – film director
- Milan Gajić – rock journalist
- Aleksandar Gajović – rock journalist, TV editor
- Miroslav Galonja – rock journalist, former producer, songwriter and rock musician, playwright
- Zoran Hristić – composer, former jazz musician, musical editor
- Ivan Ivačković – rock journalist, writer
- Jadranka Janković – rock journalist and critic
- Marko Janković – rock journalist, radio and TV host
- Petar Janjatović – rock journalist and critic
- Nikola Karaklajić – chess master, rock journalist, radio host
- Slobodan Konjović – rock journalist, radio host, former rock musician
- Stevan Koprivica – writer, manager of Duško Radović Theatre
- Siniša Kovačević – playwright, manager of Serbian National Theatre
- Branka Kirilović – theatre critic, writer, songwriter
- Nenad Kuzmić – music critic and editor
- Sonja Lopatanov – ballerina, choreographer
- Petar Lazić – Indexovo radio pozorište editor
- Mile Lojpur – rock and roll musician
- Branimir Lokner – rock journalist and critic
- Petar Luković – rock critic, writer
- Ratka Marić – sociologist, writer, rock journalist
- Višnja Marjanović – magazine editor
- Zoran Marjanović – record collector
- Dubravka Marković – TV host, rock journalist
- Goranka Matić – art photographer
- Bogomir Mijatović – radio editor
- Borislav Mitrović – rock journalist and critic, radio host
- Kokan Mladenović – theatre director
- Zoran Modli – disc jockey
- Nikola Nešković – journalist, disc jockey
- Tatjana Olujić – violinist
- Nebojša Pajkić – writer, screenwriter
- Vojislav Pantić – math professor, radio host, rock critic
- Dejan Pataković – journalist, magazine editor
- Gordan Paunović – journalist, musical editor, disc jockey
- Vladan Paunović – journalist, translator, critic
- Predrag Perišić – TV editor, playwright, screenwriter
- Ivica Petrović – journalist, rock critic
- Mladen Petrović – TV editor, playwright, songwriter
- Peca Popović – rock journalist
- Miloš Radivojević – TV and film director
- Jovan Ristić – TV, theatre and film director, theatre manager
- Ljubiša Ristić – theatre director and manager, politician
- Ivan St. Rizinger – music critic, radio editor
- Egon Savin – theatre director, university professor
- Zoran Simjanović – composer, former rock musician
- Lokica Stefanović – ballerina, choreographer
- Gorčin Stojanović – theatre and film director, music critic
- Srđan Stojanović – journalist, magazine editor
- Danilo Štrbac – writer, one of the book authors
- Bogdan Tirnanić – journalist
- Dragan Todorović – journalist, writer, radio editor
- Dinko Tucaković – film and TV director, screenwriter, journalist
- Dušan Vesić – rock journalist
- Jugoslav Vlahović – cartoonist, illustrator, graphic artist, former rock musician
- Milan Vlajčić – film critic, writer
- Ivana Vujčić – theatre director, BITEF art manager
- Mihailo Vukobratović – film, TV and theatre director
- Ksenija Zečević – composer, pianist
- Aleksandar Žikić – radio and magazine editor, playwright

== Book cover ==
The book cover was inspired by the cover of The Beatles album Sgt. Pepper's Lonely Hearts Club Band. It features rock and pop musicians Josipa Lisac, Bebi Dol, Nele Karajlić, Oliver Mandić, Marina Perazić, Branimir Štulić, Slađana Milošević and Dado Topić, Đorđe Marjanović, Dušan Kojić, Arsen Dedić, Đorđe Balašević, Viktorija, Kornelije Kovač, Zoran Miščević, Goran Bregović, Žika and Dragi Jelić, Oliver Dragojević and Mišo Kovač, Zdravko Čolić (in the Yugoslav People's Army uniform, from a photograph taken during his army service), Bora Đorđević (in a uniform similar to the ones The Beatles members are wearing on the cover of Sgt. Pepper's Lonely Hearts Club Band), and Momčilo Bajagić. The album cover also features the White Angel, Saint Sava, football player Dragan Džajić, bodybuilder Petar Čelik and his wife Irena (from the cover of Laboratorija Zvuka album Telo), actor Zoran Radmilović (in the role of King Ubu), scientist Nikola Tesla, film director Emir Kusturica, basketball player Vlade Divac, folk musician Toma Zdravković, Romani musician Šaban Bajramović, actors Dragan Nikolić and Milena Dravić (from the time of their hit TV show Obraz uz obraz), and a bust of the former Yugoslav president Josip Broz Tito.

== Reactions ==
=== Džoni Štulić ===
In his 2010 book Smijurijada, former Azra frontman Branimir Štulić commented on the book:

Funny thing, if you take these top ten albums of Yugoslav rock (out of one hundred of them) and apply the weighted points system that gets used for those sort of lists (ten points for the first spot, nine for the second, eight for the third, one for the tenth), turns out Azra gets the top spot (as it should, although that wasn't the intention of the people who organized the voting that was, by the way, limited to the local Belgrade cocoon), which is something that occurs to no one because, naturally, in the actual list Idoli are on top, then comes the Belgrade trio [Šarlo Akrobata, Električni Orgazam, Idoli], followed by the rest of the acts. While among the one hundred albums, Dugme have the most entries, then Čorba, then me (no, I'm not bitter). So, another proof that neither myself nor Tesla belong in that company.

=== Srđan "Gile" Gojković ===
In a 2011 interview for Večernje novosti, Električni Orgazam frontman Srđan Gojković "Gile", commented on the fact that Električni Orgazam albums Distorzija and Kako bubanj kaže came in at No.24 and No.73, respectively:

To be honest, it doesn't mean much to me because it doesn't quite match my own opinion. For instance, in my view Kako bubanj kaže didn't quite turn out the way we wanted it to. Although there are good songs on it that we still play, I believe it's one of the two weakest Orgazam albums. I think Lišće prekriva Lisabon is much more deserving of being on that list.

=== Zdenko Kolar ===
In 2013, for the book's 15th anniversary, Balkanrock.com webzine interviewed some of the musicians whose work made the list. Zdenko Kolar (who played on Idoli albums Odbrana i poslednji dani and VIS Idoli, ranked No.1 and No.71 respectively, as well as on the split album Paket aranžman, ranked No.2) stated:

On the one hand, I was glad – it's nice when someone remembers you, when you hear that someone appreciates your work; "It was not all in vain", as they say – and on the other hand, I believe that lists and similar 'rankings' don't reflect reality. Sure, this is a collection of a great number of relevant people's opinions, but if it were another hundred people being polled, or had the poll been organized a few years earlier, the result might not have been the same. [The fact that Odbrana i poslednji dani is ranked No.1 and Paket aranžman is ranked No.2] doesn't mean much to me. It was a long time ago, after all, and life goes on, bringing new things that are more current and contemporary, which from this point of view seem more important to me and have, I think, been more fulfilling to me. [...] It's interesting that the ranking of the [Idoli] albums on this list is inversely proportional to the number of copies they sold. I really couldn't tell you if the list is fair, or whether some album is missing, or if some of those that made the list are overrated/underrated. It's just a matter of taste after all, and in matters of taste...

=== Vedad Hadžiabdić ===
In the same online piece, Teška Industrija guitarist Vedad Hadžiabdić, whose album Teška Industrija was ranked No.95, stated:

In my opinion, it includes everything that was important on the Yugoslav rock scene. [...] From this point of view, I think Teška Industrija could have been ranked a bit higher. Anyway, I'm glad that we're among the 100 most important.

=== Nikola Čuturilo "Čutura" ===
Further on in the same piece, Nikola Čuturilo (whose solo album 9 lakih komada was ranked No.99 and who played on Riblja Čorba albums Istina and Osmi nervni slom, ranked No.43 and No.83 respectively) stated:

I never attached all that much importance to these types of lists because, in the end, it's just a collection of individual viewpoints. Of course, having said that, back 15 years ago when they told me I made the list, I was a bit surprised, and it wasn't like I wasn't glad. My thinking is similar today [15 years later], some things have definitely been unjustly omitted, and a lot of the overrated albums have been included. Besides, you can just glance through the list and look at each album individually for a few moments, and ask yourself 'how many of these songs have successfully stood the test of time', 'how many of them are still alive today'. The answer explains a lot of things... My 98th [sic!] spot is great, as far as I'm concerned [...] The Istina album features "Pogledaj dom svoj, anđele", and it's been ranked at No.43... That made me laugh...

== 100 Best Serbian Albums Published after the Breakup of SFRY ==
In 2021, Antonić published the book Kako (ni)je propao rokenrol u Srbiji (How Rock 'n' Roll in Serbia (Didn't) Came to an End). Besides Antonić's essays on Serbian rock scene, the book also features a list of 100 best Serbian rock albums published after the breakup of SFR Yugoslavia. The list was formed according to a poll of 58 Serbian music journalists, critics, artists and others related to Serbian rock scene, conducted in a similar way to the poll in the book YU 100: najbolji albumi jugoslovenske rok i pop muzike.

== See also ==
- Kako (ni)je propao rokenrol u Srbiji
- Rock Express Top 100 Yugoslav Rock Songs of All Times
- B92 Top 100 Domestic Songs
- The 100 most prominent Serbs
