= The Best of Rock za Hrvatsku =

1992 compilation album by various artists

Compilation album
- Recorded: 1992
- Genre: Croatian music Anti-war songs Pop music Rock music
- Label: Croatia Records

"The Best of Rock za Hrvatsku" (Rock for Croatia) was a popular compilation album of anti-war and patriotic songs released in 1992 during the Croatian War of Independence. Some of the contributing artists had been popular across the then recently defunct federation of Yugoslavia, namely Psihomodo pop, Jura Stublić, Parni valjak, Boa and Aerodrom's Jura Pađen. These artists took a pro-Croatian stance as the breakup of Yugoslavia and the Yugoslav Wars began, while others such as Azra did not participate because they disbanded and because of Branimir "Johnny" Štulić's publicly known frustrations with politics of the time.

The album also ushered in some new faces who would become the first generation of distinctly Croatian acts: the dance group ET, rock band Thompson and others.

== Track listing ==
1. "Croatia in Flames" (3:12) by Montažstroj & H.C. Boxer
2. "Hrvatska mora pobijediti" (4:35) by Psihomodo pop
3. "Moj dom" (5:08) by Dino Dvornik, Gibonni and Marijan Ban
4. "Hrvatine" (3:40) by Novak and Kopola
5. "Hrvatska mora biti slobodna" (2:45) by CLF
6. "E moj druže beogradski" (4:13) by Jura Stublić
7. "Pjesma je jača od minobacača" (3:13) by Mucalo
8. "Kekec je slobodan, red je na nas" (4:30) by Parni valjak
9. "Molitva za mir" (3:42) by Electro Team
10. "Bojna Čavoglave" (3:23) by Thompson
11. "Tko to tamo gine" (1:50) by Jura Pađen
12. "Sloboda i mir" (3:43) by Josipa Lisac
13. "Why" (2:45) by Daleka Obala
14. "Zemlja" (5:50) by Boa
15. "Can we go higher?" (6:23) by Nenad Bach
16. "Lijepa naša" (1:50) by Novak and Kopola
17. "Čekam te" (3:00) by ZG Glumice
