= Hitovi i legende =

Live album by Aerodrom
- Released: 11 November 2009
- Recorded: 13 December 2008; Tvornica Kulture (Zagreb, Croatia)
- Genre: Rock
- Length: 1:07:51
- Label: Croatia Records

Aerodrom chronology
The Ultimate Collection (2008)	Hitovi i legende (2009)	Taktika noja (2012)

Singles from Hitovi i legende
- 1. "Obična ljubavna pjesma" Released: November 2010

Hitovi i legende is the first live album of the Croatian rock band Aerodrom, released through Croatia Records in November 2009. The album was recorded in "Tvornica Kulture" club in Zagreb on 13 December 2008. The band consisted of Jurica Pađen, Tomislav Šojat, Ivan Havidić and Boris Leiner. Track listing included biggest hits of Pađen's career and bands he was a member of or worked with, like Aerodrom, Pađen Band, Azra, Parni Valjak, Film and Haustor.

== Track listing ==
All music and lyrics written by Jurica Pađen, except noted.

No.	Title	Lyrics	Music	Length
1.	"Digni me visoko"			2:32
2.	"Slatka mala stvar"			2:34
3.	"Divljakuša"			3:37
4.	"Usne vrele višnje"	Branimir Štulić	Traditional, Nino Rota	4:00
5.	"Otkazani let"			3:48
6.	"Obična ljubavna pjesma"			6:29
7.	"Moja prva ljubav"	Srđan Sacher	Srđan Sacher	4:26
8.	"24 sata"			4:01
9.	"Lutka za bal"	Husein Hasanefendić	Husein Hasanefendić	4:06
10.	"Fratello"			3:05
11.	"Pjevajmo do zore"	Jura Stublić	Jura Stublić	3:41
12.	"Tvoj pas me čudno gleda"			4:51
13.	"A šta da radim"	Branimir Štulić	Branimir Štulić	2:48
14.	"Što si u kavu stavila"			2:56
15.	"Stavi pravu stvar"			4:27
16.	"Suzama"			3:56
17.	"Ko je umro više puta (Bonus track)"			3:27
18.	"Farma Band Aid (Bonus Track)"			3:07
Total length:				1:07:51

== Personnel ==
Aerodrom

- Jurica Pađen – Guitars, lead vocals
- Tomislav Šojat – Bass, backup vocals, lead vocals on tracks 4, 7, 9 and 11
- Ivan Havidić – Guitars, backup vocals
- Boris Leiner – Drums

Additional musicians

- Ana Šuto – Backup vocals on track 17

Artwork

- Igor CC Kelčec – Photography and illustration

Production

- Recorded by Juraj Havidić
- Mixed by Juraj Havidić and Ivan Havidić
- Mastered by Dragutin Smokrović – Smokva
