= Film (band) =

Yugoslav rock band

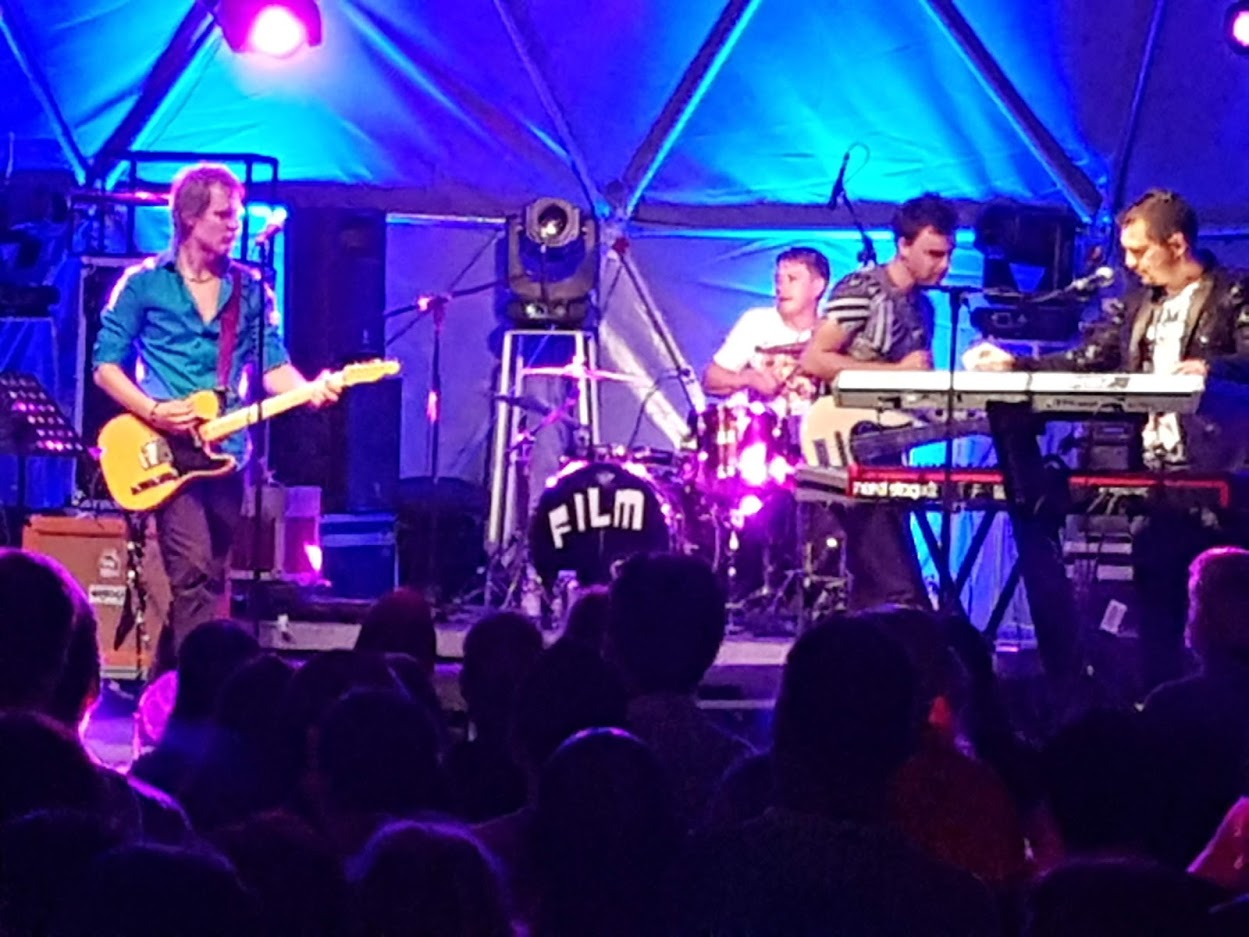
- Film performing in 2018 at the Dubrovnik Craft Beer Festival

Background information
- Also known as: Jura Stublić & Film
- Origin: Zagreb, SR Croatia, SFR Yugoslavia
- Genres: Punk rock (early); new wave; ska; art rock; pop rock
- Years active: 1978–present
- Labels: Suzy, Helidon, Jugoton, Croatia Records
- Spinoff of: Azra
- Members: Jura Stublić
- Past members: Mladen Juričić; Marino Pelajić; Branko Hromatko; Jurij Novoselić; Piko Stančić; Dražen Šolc; Robert Krkač; Dario Kumerle; Željko Turčinović; Bojan Goričanin; Deni Kožić; Davor Vidiš; Mario Zidar; Vjekoslav Magdalenić; Ante Pecotić; Goran Rakočević

Film is a Croatian and Yugoslav rock band formed in Zagreb in 1978. Film is generally considered one of the most prominent acts of the Yugoslav new wave scene, as well as one of the most notable acts of the Yugoslav rock scene in general.

Film was formed in 1978 by vocalist Jurislav "Jura" Stublić, guitarist Mladen Juričić, bass guitarist Marino Pelajić, and drummer Branko Hromatko, after four of them left the band Azra. They were soon joined by saxophonist Jurij Novoselić and gained the attention of the Yugoslav public and music press as a live act. Their debut album Novo! Novo! Novo! Još jučer samo na filmu a sada i u vašoj glavi, recorded with the new drummer Ivan "Piko" Stančić and released in 1981, established them as one of the leading acts of the Yugoslav new wave. After their second, thematically and musically darker studio album Zona sumraka, released in 1982, the band moved towards more mainstream rock sound with the albums Sva čuda svijeta (1983) and Signali u noći (1985), released to large commercial success and critical acclaim, the group becoming one of the most popular acts of the Yugoslav rock scene.

Despite commercial and critical success, the original incarnation of the group split up in 1986 due to long-time disagreements about future musical direction between Stublić and the rest of the members. Stublić would continue with a backing band, performing under the name Jura Stublić & Film, releasing two successful pop rock-oriented albums in the late 1980s, while the rest of the members continued with the more artistic approach under the name Le Cinema. Jura Stublić & Film's latest studio release, Hrana za golubove, appeared in 1992, and in the following years Stublić would release new songs on compilation albums only. Stublić, Juričić, Pelajić and Stančić made a one-off reunion in 1998. During recent years, Jura Stublić & Film, although officially still active, perform live occasionally only.

== History ==
=== Original incarnation of the band (1978–1986) ===
==== New wave years (1979–1982) ====
During 1977 and 1978, guitarist Mladen Juričić, bass guitarist Marino Pelajić, and drummer Branko Hromatko were the members of the Zagreb new wave band Azra, when the band's vocalist and guitarist Branimir "Johnny" Štulić brought in Jurislav "Jura" Stublić as the new vocalist. Stublić did not have much experience as a vocalist before joining the band, however, since his father had been an opera singer, he often visited the theatre and opera, and at the age of 13 he started playing the guitar, earning money as a street performer at seaside resorts. Prior to joining Azra, Stublić was also considered by the members of Aerodrom as their new frontman, but eventually they opted not to include him in the lineup due to his deep vocals. The Azra lineup featuring Stublić functioned for a few months only, and after a quarrel with Štulić, in early 1979, Stublić, Juričić, Pelajić and Hromatko left Azra and formed their own band. The band was initially named Šporko Šalaporko i Negove Žaluzine (Šporko Šalaporko and His Window Blinds), after a story from the Polet youth magazine, the members soon deciding to rename the group to Film. The memories of the Azra lineup later inspired Štulić to write the song "Roll over Jura", released on the album Filigranski pločnici (Filigree Pavements) in 1982.

Film was soon joined by saxophone player Jurij Novoselić, who at the time worked under the pseudonym Kuzma Videosex, inspiring others to use pseudonym instead of their original names: vocalist Stublić became Jura Jupiter, bassist Pelajić became Mario Baraccuda and guitarist Juričić became Max Wilson. After their first live appearances in Zagreb, they were quickly described by the Yugoslav music press as a new wave club attraction, which gave them an opportunity to appear as an opening act for Lene Lovich on her 1980 Yugoslav tour. At the time, the band recorded their first single, "Kad si mlad" ("When You're Young"), with the song "Zajedno" ("Together") as the B-side. The single was, however, released a year later, due to Suzy record label refusal to accept the band's idea of putting a screen-shot from the film Barbarella on the single cover, deeming the idea noncommercial. In the summer of 1980, the band played in the play Ljetno popodne ili što se dogodilo s Vlastom Hršak (Summer Afternoon or What Happened to Vlasta Hršak), performed by the Kugla glumište theatre on the Dubrovnik Summer Festival, and in the autumn of the same year they performed on the prominent Youth Festival in Subotica, winning the first place with the song "Neprilagođen" ("Misfit").

In 1981, Hromatko went to serve his mandatory stint in the Yugoslav People's Army, and was replaced by Ivan "Piko" Stančić, a former member of Grupa 220, Time and Parni Valjak. With Stančić, the band recorded their debut album Novo! Novo! Novo! Još jučer samo na filmu a sada i u vašoj glavi (Extra! Extra! Extra! Yesterday Only on Film and Now Also in Your Head), released in 1981 through Helidon record label, to large commercial and critical success. The album, produced by Buldožer member Boris Bele, brought a series of urban ska songs, all authored by Stublić, inspired by the Zagreb city life: "Neprilagođen" ("Misfit"), "Moderna djevojka" ("Modern Girl"), "Radio ljubav" ("Radio Love"), "Odvedi me iz ovog grada" ("Take Me Out of This Town"), and "Zamisli" ("Imagine"), also known as "Zamisli život u ritmu muzike za ples" ("Imagine a Life in the Rhythm of Music for Dancing") on some of the band's later releases. The initial number of album copies was issued on green vinyl.

In January 1981, the band triumphed at the Pozdrav iz Zagreba (Greetings from Zagreb) festival held in Belgrade Youth Center. At the time, rock critic Dražen Vrdoljak occasionally performed with the band playing organ. The band performed with him in Subotica Sports Hall during the 1981 Youth Festival as the winners of the previous festival, causing a spectacle with the audience massively occupying the stage. The energy of their live appearances was captured on the live mini album Film u Kulušiću – Live (Film in Kulušić - Live), recorded in the Zagreb club Kulušić on 11 February 1981. The record, the first of the many live releases recorded in the same club, featured a witty band introduction by Vrdoljak in French language, and live versions of six tracks originally released on the first album. The album was a commercial success, selling more than 100,000 copies.

After the mini album release, the band went on an Adriatic coast tour with the Belgrade new wave band Idoli, with whom Film members became close after the 1980 Youth Festival, on which the both bands had performed. Two bands loaded their equipment in a boat, sailing from one coastal town to another, holding improvised concerts for tourists. At the time, Jugoton rereleased Film u Kulušiću – Live and Idoli EP VIS Idoli as a split compilation Zajedno (Together).

At the end of 1981, after a quarrel between Stublić and the rest of the band on the new studio album conception, the band went on a two-month work break; the reason for the quarrel was Stublić's desire to record an album of optimistic and romantic songs, while the rest of the members wanted their next album to be thematically and musically darker. Having agreed on the future of their work, the band recorded the second studio album Zona sumraka (Twilight Zone), released in 1982 through Yugoslavia's biggest record label, Jugoton, offering a more depressive view of the city life, covering loneliness, alienation, crime and drug addiction. Successful with the songs "Zagreb je hladan grad" ("Zagreb Is a Cold City") and "Krvariš oko ponoći" ("You're Bleeding Around Midnight"), the album featured two instrumental tracks, "España" ("Spain") and "Džems Bond" ("James Bond"), the latter a cover of the theme from the film serial of the same name. This time, as authors on the album beside Stublić appeared Juričić, Stančić and Novoselić. During the promotional tour, the band performed in Linz, Austria, which was the only concert the original incarnation of the band held outside Yugoslavia. Film's performance in Linz was praised by the Austrian press.

==== Mainstream rock years (1983–1986) ====
For the recording of the third studio album, the band went to Sweden, where, with producer Tihomir "Tini" Varga, the band recorded their third album. Due to Pelajić's departure to the army, Juričić recorded the bass parts. The album's working title was Himne radosti (Odes to Joy), but it was eventually named Sva čuda svijeta (All the Wonders of the World), featuring cover designed by artist Mirko Ilić. The album opens with the recording of Clint Eastwood voice from the film Dirty Harry, followed by the hit songs "Boje su u nama" ("The Colors Are Inside Us"), "Kada budu gorijeli gradovi" ("When the Cities Would Burn"), "Sva čuda svijeta", "Istina piše na zidu" ("The Truth Is Written on the Wall"), the ballad "Mi nismo sami" ("We Are Not Alone") and "Na drugoj strani neba" ("On the Other Side of Heaven"). More pop-influenced and optimistic than the band's previous works, the album was a commercial and critical success, establishing Film as one of the top mainstream acts of the Yugoslav rock scene. After the album release, Juričić also went to serve his army stint, being temporarily replaced by former Drugi Način member Robert Krkač on the promotional tour, while Pelajić was replaced by Mladen Žunjić.

The band prepared their following album during a month and a half they spent on the island of Olib. The album, entitled Signali u noći (Signals in the Night), was recorded with the returned Pelajić and Juričić and the new drummer Dražen Šolc. The album was produced by the band themselves and the English musician and producer Nick Van Eede. Guests on the album recording included Massimo Savić of Dorian Gray on guitar and backing vocals, Davor Slamnig on guitar, Ljerka Šimara on harp, and Nikola Santro on trombone. Released in 1985, the album was another commercial and critical success, bringing audience's concert favorites "Pjevajmo do zore" ("Let's Sing Until Dawn"), "Rijeke pravde" ("Rivers of Justice"), "Osmijesi" ("Smiles"), and the title track. During the same year, Stublić took part in the YU Rock Misija project, a Yugoslav contribution to Live Aid, contributing vocals to the song "Za milion godina". In addition, Film, alongside 23 other acts, performed at the corresponding charity concert held at the Red Star Stadium in Belgrade.

At the time of Signali u noći release, Juričić, Pelajić and Stančić formed the band Le Cinema, performing cover versions of foreign new wave hits, expressing their musical differences to the ones Stublić had, which led the band to part ways in the spring of 1986.

=== Post original band disbandment (1986–present) ===
==== Jura Stublić & Film (1986–present) ====
In 1987, Stublić released the studio album Sunce sja (The Sun Is Shining), recorded with Robert Krkač (guitar), Dario Kumerle (bass), Željko Turčinović (drums) and Bojan Goričan (keyboards), under the moniker Jura Stublić & Film. As guest vocalists appeared Jurica Pađen and Massimo Savić. Focusing on the pop rock sound, Stublić recorded the album which brought the hits "Srce na cesti" ("Heart on the Road"), "Ivana", "Dom" ("Home"), "Valovi ('67.-'77.-'87.)" ("Waves ('67-77-87)") and "Sjećam se prvog poljupca" ("I Remember the First Kiss").

The following release, the 1989 studio album Zemlja sreće (The Land of Happiness), featured the new guitarist Deni Kožić and drummer Davor Vidiš, and as guests on the album appeared Massimo Savić, Bijelo Dugme keyboardist Laza Ristovski, Leb i Sol guitarist Vlatko Stefanovski, guitarist Branko Bogunović, guitarist Davor Rodik and klapa Bonaca. The album featured the hits "Dobre vibracije" ("Good Vibrations"), "Doći ću ti u snovima" ("I'll Come to You in Your Dreams"), "Ljubav je zakon" ("Love Is the Law"), and "Uhvati vjetar" ("Catch the Wind"), the latter a cover of Silute version of Donovan's "Catch the Wind". During the same year, the band also appeared on the double various artists live album ZG forces live, released by Jugoton, featuring most popular Zagreb bands at the time, Film, Psihomodo Pop, Parni Valjak and Prljavo Kazalište, each covering one LP side on the release.

During the early 1990s, Stublić often changed the members of his backing band. In 1992, he released the studio album Hrana za golubove (Food for Pigeons). The album brought the hit song "E moj druže beogradski" ("Oh, My Belgrade Friend"), inspired by the ongoing Yugoslav wars, which was interpreted in different ways in both Croatia and Serbia, and as a result praised and criticized in both countries. The song was recorded as a cover of the song "Na morskome plavom žalu" ("On the Blue Sea Strand"), originally recorded for the Emir Kusturica's 1981 film Do You Remember Dolly Bell?, with new lyrics. The lineup which recorded the album, beside Stublić, featured Mario Zidar (guitar), Vjekoslav Magdalenić (keyboards), Ante Pecotić (bass guitar) and Goran Rakočević (drums). Beside new songs, the album featured new versions of old Film songs, which the music critics saw as decline in Stublić's creativity.

In 1994, the first Film compilation album was released, entitled Greatest Hits Vol. 1 and featuring two new songs, "Nježno, nježno, nježnije" ("Gentle, Gentle, Gentler") and the cynical "Čikago" ("Chicago"), a cover version of the old youth work action song "U tunelu usred mraka" ("In the Tunnel in the Dark"). The recording "Čikago" was in possession of the record label for six months, eventually being released without a line from the lyrics, due to the lyrics being critical to the government and the authorities of the newly independent Croatia. Despite the fact that a line was omitted from the song, it was banned in some Croatian media. "Nježno, nježno, nježnije" featured guest appearances by Juričić and klapa Grdelini, while "Čikago" was recorded with former Valentino and Crvena Jabuka member Nikša Bratoš. The followup was the compilation Greatest Hits Vol. 2, released in 1996, featuring the rerecorded "Neprilagođen", "Moderna djevojka" and "Boje su u nama", and the new track "Lijepo, lijepo, neopisivo" ("Beautiful, Beautiful, Inexplicable"), the latter a cover of Gianna Nannini song "Bello e impossibile".

In 2002, Stublić released Jura Stublić & Film latest album, the compilation Sve najbolje (All the Best), which featured old songs and five new songs, including a new cover of "Na morskome plavom žalu", this time with original title and lyrics.

==== Le Cinema (1985–2007) ====
The supergroup Le Cinema (Film in French) was formed in December 1985, while the original incarnation of Film was still active, by all the members of the Film excluding Jura Stublić – Mladen "Max" Juričić, Marino "Barracuda" Pelajić and Ivan "Piko" Stančić. The band, mainly performing the new wave and punk rock standards, quickly became a club attraction. The band's concerts often featured guest appearances by actress Mira Furlan, as well as musicians Massimo Savić, Vlada Divljan and Drago Mlinarec, with whom the band recorded a cover version of Mlinarec's Grupa 220 hit single "Osmijeh" ("Smile").

The band released the album Rocking at the Party Live!, recorded live in Kulušić club, in early 1988, offering their interpretation of the famous songs by John Lennon, Chuck Berry, Talking Heads, The Ramones, Blondie and others. The album also featured the song "Maršal" ("Marshall"), originally released as "Poslednji dani" ("The Last Days") by Idoli on their debut album Odbrana i poslednji dani (The Defense and the Last Days), featuring former Idoli member Vlada Divljan. The album opened with the band introduction by Dražen Vrdoljak. After the album release, the band performed over two hundred concerts across Yugoslavia.

Simultaneously with their work in Le Cinema, the band members performed in other bands: Juričić formed Vještice with former Azra drummer Boris Leiner, later moving to the band Šo! Mazgoon, then to Gego & Picigin band, and eventually forming the bands Ljetno Kino (Summer Cinema) and Plesač Sporog Ritma (Slow Rhythm Dancer). Pelajić joined Haustor, recording the 1988 album Tajni grad (Secret City) with the band. Novoselić formed his band Dee Dee Mellow, for a period of time was a member of Disciplina Kičme, and finally joined Psihomodo Pop.

After a longer hiatus, the band renewed their activities in 1997, with the new bassist Žan Jankopač from the band Šo! Mazgoon. The original lineup reunited for the recording of the comeback album Doručak kod Trulog (Breakfast at Rotten's), featuring nine cover versions of old Film songs, including "Zona sumraka" ("Twilight zone") with Majke vocalist Goran Bare on lead vocals. The album also featured a cover of Šarlo Akrobata song "Ona se budi" ("She is Waking Up"), recorded live in the Zagreb KSET club on 12 October 2002, and covers of songs by foreign rock acts. The disc also featured the band's only song which was not a cover, "Mogu ja!" ("I Can!"), remastered material from the Rocking at the Party Live!, and music videos, including the one recorded for the song "Osmijeh" with Drago Mlinarec.

On February 22, 2003, the band appeared on the Ekatarina Velika tribute album Jako dobar tattoo! Tribute to EKV (Very Good Tattoo! Tribute to EKV) with the cover of Ekatarina Velika song "Krug" ("The Circle"), recorded on 22 February 2003 on the tribute concert for Ekatarina Velika frontman Milan Mladenović held in Zagreb's Tvornica kulture.

Le Cinema officially ended their activity in 2007.

==== Default lineup reunion (1998) ====
In mid-1998, Juričić, Pelajić and Stančić reunited with Stublić for a one-off show at the Zagreb gori (Zagreb's Burning) open-air concert, featuring other acts of the Zagreb new wave scene.

== Legacy ==
Film ballad "Mi nismo sami" was covered by numerous artists. It was covered by Serbian and Yugoslav rock band Galija on their 1992 7-inch single Jednom u sto godina (Once In a Hundred Years), by Croatian and Yugoslav rock band Daleka Obala on their 1997 album Di si ti (Where Are You), by Branimir Štulić in 2011 for his YouTube channel, by Croatian and Yugoslav singer Massimo Savić on his 2006 album Vještina II (Art II), and by Croatian and Yugoslav musician Darko Rundek in 2019 for Top.hr YouTube channel. Film song "Zajedno" was covered by Serbian band Plejboj and released as a single in 1995. The song "Odvedi me iz ovog grada" was covered by Serbian rock band Eva Braun for their 1998 album Heart Core. The songs "Neprilagođen", "Zamisli" and "Odvedi me iz ovog grada" were covered on the 2001 album Yugoton, featuring covers of songs by Yugoslav rock acts by Polish musicians. The song "Zamisli život u ritmu muzike za ples" was covered by the Croatian world music band Postolar Tripper on their 2007 album the title of which was inspired by the song, Zamisli život u ritmu cipela za ples (Imagine a Life in the Rhythm of Dancing Shoes).

In 1998, the album Novo! Novo! Novo! Još jučer samo na filmu a sada i u vašoj glavi was polled No. 22, Signali u noći was polled No. 67, Sva čuda svijeta was polled No. 69, and Film u Kulušiću – Live was polled No. 70 on the list of 100 Greatest Albums of Yugoslav Popular Music in the book YU 100: najbolji albumi jugoslovenske rok i pop muzike (YU 100: The Best albums of Yugoslav pop and rock music). In 2015, Novo! Novo! Novo! Još jučer samo na filmu a sada i u vašoj glavi was polled No. 14 and Film u Kulušiću – Live was polled No. 45 on the list of 100 Greatest Yugoslav Albums published by the Croatian edition of Rolling Stone. In 1987, in YU legende uživo (YU Legends Live), a special publication by Rock magazine, Film u Kulušiću – Live was proclaimed one of 12 best Yugoslav live albums.

In 2000, "Mi nismo sami" was polled No. 36, and "Zajedno" was polled No. 81 on the Rock Express Top 100 Yugoslav Rock Songs of All Times list. In 2006, "Zamisli" was polled No. 27, "Neprilagođen" was polled No. 80, and "Boje su u nama" was polled No. 85 on the B92 Top 100 Domestic Songs list.

The lyrics of 12 songs by the band, all authored by Stublić, were featured in Petar Janjatović's book Pesme bratstva, detinjstva & potomstva: Antologija ex YU rok poezije 1967 - 2007 (Songs of Brotherhood, Childhood & Offspring: Anthology of Ex YU Rock Poetry 1967 – 2007).

In 2022, Stublić was awarded the Porin Lifetime Achievement Award.

== Discography ==
=== As Film ===
==== Studio albums ====
- Novo! Novo! Novo! Još jučer samo na filmu a sada i u vašoj glavi (1981)
- Zona sumraka (1982)
- Sva čuda svijeta (1983)
- Signali u noći (1985)

==== Live albums ====
- Film u Kulušiću – Live (1981)

==== Singles ====
- "Kad si mlad" / "Zajedno" (1980)
- "Zamisli" / "Radio ljubav" (1981)
- "Zona sumraka" / "Espanja" (1982)
- "Pljačka stoljeća" / "Zagreb je hladan grad" (1982)
- "Ti zračiš zrake kroz zrak" / "Mi nismo sami" (1983)
- "Boje su u nama" / "Istina piše na zidu" (1983)

=== As Jura Stublić & Film ===
==== Studio albums ====
- Sunce sja (1987)
- Zemlja sreće (1989)
- Hrana za golubove (1992)

==== Compilation albums ====
- Greatest hits vol. 1 (1994)
- Greatest hits vol. 2 (1996)
- Sve najbolje (2001)
