= List of number-one albums of 2024 (Croatia) =

This is a list of the albums ranked number one in the Croatia during 2024. The top-performing albums and EPs in Croatia are ranked on the Top lista chart, which is published by the Croatian Phonographic Association. The data is compiled from 164 record-selling locations and online stores provided by music labels. The chart is based on the physical and digital sales of albums in Croatia and does not include album-equivalent units. Two separate album charts are published: one for domestic artists, which includes all albums released by Croatian labels, and another for international artists, which features albums published by foreign labels.

In 2024, twenty-four albums reached number one on the Croatian domestic album chart. Bitanga i princeza by Bijelo Dugme and Ravno do dna by Azra each tied as the longest-running number-one albums of the year, spending seven cumulative weeks at the top. In 2024, twenty-six albums reached number one on the Croatian international album chart. Radical Optimism by Dua Lipa was the longest-running number-one album of the year, spending eight cumulative weeks at the top.

== Number-one albums by week ==
Issue date	Domestic Album	Artist	Ref.	International Album	Artist	Ref.
31 December	Totalno drukčiji od drugih	Vještice		1989 (Taylor's Version)	Taylor Swift	
7 January	Tišina mora	Oliver Dragojević		Glupost je neuništiva	KUD Idijoti	
14 January	Poleti ptico	Marko Kutlić		Hackney Diamonds	The Rolling Stones	
21 January	Monologue	Mia Dimšić		Fe3O4: Break	Nmixx	
28 January	Totalno drukčiji od drugih	Vještice		Follow the Blind Man	Jelusick	
4 February	25 Greatest Hits	Zdravko Čolić		Saviors	Green Day	
11 February	Za šaku ljubavi	Mladen Grdović		...And Justice for All	Metallica	
18 February	Za šaku ljubavi	Mladen Grdović		Euforija	Buč Kesidi	
25 February	Za šaku ljubavi	Mladen Grdović		Rock-Star	Stray Kids	
3 March	Treta majka	Vlatko Stefanovski and Miroslav Tadić		Celebration	Madonna	
10 March	Za šaku ljubavi	Mladen Grdović		Euforija	Buč Kesidi	
17 March	Indexi	Indexi		Invincible Shield	Judas Priest	
24 March	Indexi	Indexi		Invincible Shield	Judas Priest	
31 March	Indexi	Indexi		Eternal Sunshine	Ariana Grande	
7 April	Indexi	Indexi		Minisode 3: Tomorrow	Tomorrow X Together	
14 April	Indexi	Indexi		One Deep River	Mark Knopfler	
21 April	San	Elena Brnić		The Tortured Poets Department	Taylor Swift	
28 April	Indexi	Indexi		The Tortured Poets Department	Taylor Swift	
5 May	Indexi	Indexi		Radical Optimism	Dua Lipa	
12 May	25 Greatest Hits	Tomislav Ivčić		Radical Optimism	Dua Lipa	
19 May	Minimalizam	Boris Štok		Radical Optimism	Dua Lipa	
26 May	Vo–Zdra	Hali Gali Halid		Radical Optimism	Dua Lipa	
2 June	Vo–Zdra	Hali Gali Halid		Radical Optimism	Dua Lipa	
9 June	CMC Festival Vodice 2024.	Various Artists		Radical Optimism	Dua Lipa	
16 June	CMC Festival Vodice 2024.	Various Artists		Radical Optimism	Dua Lipa	
23 June	Mirušu jabuke	Crvena Jabuka		Radical Optimism	Dua Lipa	
30 June	Album	Nula		Brat	Charli XCX	
7 July	Okus ljubavi	Vigor		Mizar	Mizar	
14 July	Bitanga i princeza	Bijelo Dugme		Brat	Charli XCX	
21 July	Bitanga i princeza	Bijelo Dugme		Brat	Charli XCX	
28 July	Bitanga i princeza	Bijelo Dugme		Stop Making Sense	Talking Heads	
4 August	Bitanga i princeza	Bijelo Dugme		Ate	Stray Kids	
11 August	Ravno do dna	Azra		Ate	Stray Kids	
18 August	Ravno do dna	Azra		Ate	Stray Kids	
25 August	Ravno do dna	Azra		Brat	Charli XCX	
1 September	Bitanga i princeza	Bijelo dugme		Glupost je neuništiva	KUD Idijoti	
8 September	Bitanga i princeza	Bijelo dugme		Wild God	Nick Cave and the Bad Seeds	
15 September	Bitanga i princeza	Bijelo dugme		Luck and Strange	David Gilmour	
22 September	Ravno do dna	Azra		Luck and Strange	David Gilmour	
29 September	Ravno do dna	Azra		Wild God	Nick Cave and the Bad Seeds	
6 October	Ravno do dna	Azra		Moon Music	Coldplay	
13 October	Ravno do dna	Azra		Cutouts	The Smile	
20 October	Judi, zviri i beštimje	Gibonni		Wild God	Nick Cave and the Bad Seeds	
27 October	Live at Tvornica	Bajaga i Instruktori		Wild God	Nick Cave and the Bad Seeds	
3 November	Judi, ziviri i beštimje	Gibonni		Cutouts	The Smile	
10 November	Judi, ziviri i beštimje	Gibonni		Wild God	Nick Cave and the Bad Seeds	
17 November	Evergreen vještina	Massimo		Ate	Stray Kids	
24 November	Dugopolje (Live 2024)	Marko Perković Thompson		From Zero	Linkin Park	
1 December	Dugopolje (Live 2024)	Marko Perković Thompson		From Zero	Linkin Park	
8 December	Dugopolje (Live 2024)	Marko Perković Thompson		From Zero	Linkin Park	
15 December	Cukar i sol	Dalmatino		From Zero	Linkin Park	
22 December	Dnevnik velikog Perice	Various Artists		From Zero	Linkin Park	
29 December	Dnevnik velikog Perice	Various Artists		Live from the Royal Albert Hall	Dua Lipa	

== See also ==
- List of number-one singles of 2024 (Croatia)
