= Dukat i pribadače =

Studio album by Aerodrom
- Released: 1984
- Recorded: 1984; Truly Sound Studio (Zagreb, Croatia)
- Genre: Rock, Pop rock
- Length: 39:42
- Label: Jugoton
- Producer: Rajko Dujmić

Aerodrom chronology
Obične ljubavne pjesme (1982)	Dukat i pribadače (1984)	Trojica u mraku (1986)

Singles from Dukat i pribadače
- 1. "Fratello" Released: 1984; 2. "24 sata dnevno" Released: 1984; 3. "Digni me visoko" Released: 1984

Dukat i pribadače is the fourth album of the Croatian rock band Aerodrom, released through Jugoton in 1984. The album is recorded as a trio with the new drummer Nenad Smoljanović. The keyboards were played by Rajko Dujmić of Novi Fosili, who is also the producer of the album. Dukat i pribadače turns the band's sound on a pop rock path and carries three successful singles, "Fratello", "24 sata dnevno", which were released on a 7" record, and "Digni me visoko".

== Track listing ==
All lyrics written by Jurica Pađen, all arrangements by Aerodrom and Rajko Dujmić, except tracks 4, 5 and 6 by Rajko Dujmić.

Side one
No.	Title	Music	Length
1.	"7 milja iznad mora"	Jurica Pađen	4:33
2.	"Daj neku lovu"	Jurica Pađen	2:48
3.	"Puno mi je trebalo"	Jurica Pađen	3:33
4.	"Fratello"	Jurica Pađen	2:13
5.	"Laž"	Jurica Pađen	4:10
6.	"Digni me visoko"	Jurica Pađen	3:07

Side two
No.	Title	Music	Length
7.	"24 sata dnevno"	Jurica Pađen	4:17
8.	"Reci mi što čuješ"	Jurica Pađen	4:19
9.	"Jedan, dva, tri"	Jurica Pađen, Remo Cartagine	3:24
10.	"Novogodišnja noć"	Remo Cartagine	3:41
11.	"Dukat i pribadače"	Remo Cartagine	3:38
Total length:			39:42

== Personnel ==
Aerodrom

- Jurica Pađen – Guitars, lead vocals
- Remo Cartagine – Bass, acoustic piano in track 11
- Nenad Smoljanović – Drums, percussions

Additional musicians

- Rajko Dujmić – Keyboards, backup vocals
- Vesna Srečković – Backup vocals

Artwork

- Vjekoslav Ivezić – Design

Production

- Rajko Dujmić – Producer
- Vedran Božić – Assistant engineer
- Dubravko Majnarić – Executive producer
- Recorded by Hrvoje Hegedušić
