= Kad fazani lete =

Studio album by Azra
- Released: 1983
- Recorded: 15–25 January 1983
- Studios: Cream Studio (Frankfurt, West Germany)
- Genres: Rock, new wave
- Length: 35:05
- Labels: Jugoton, Azra Music
- Producer: Branimir Štulić

Azra chronology
Singl ploče 1979–1982 (1982)	Kad fazani lete (1983)	Krivo srastanje (1983)

Kad fazani lete is the fourth studio album of the rock band Azra, released through Jugoton in 1983. It was recorded in Germany without two original members Mišo Hrnjak and Boris Leiner, who went to serve compulsory military service. Leiner was replaced on drums by Srećko Antonioli, while Štulić played guitar and bass.

In late 1982, Štulić presented his songs to Goran Bregović, who was supposed to produce the new album. However, the collaboration was later cancelled by Štulić.

The album features a different sound of the band, closer to hard rock. Petar Luković, writing for Džuboks in 1983, noted that it "sounded completely different without Leiner and Hrnjak". Štulić described it as "a record for big stages and big concerts".

Kad fazani lete has been described as "the last truly great and significant original long play studio release under the name of Azra".

== Track listing ==
All music and lyrics written by Branimir Štulić.

Side one
No.	Title	Length
1.	"Anđeli" ("Angels")	5:47
2.	"Kao i jučer" ("Like Yesterday")	4:22
3.	"My dear"	3:46
4.	"Idi za svojom sudbinom" ("Go With Your Destiny")	4:00

Side two
No.	Title	Length
5.	"Kad fazani lete" ("When The Pheasants Fly")	3:21
6.	"Niska bisera" ("String of Pearls")	3:26
7.	"Štićenik" ("Protector")	2:13
8.	"Nebo iznad Trnskog" ("Sky Above the Thorny")	3:00
9.	"Nemir i strast" ("Restlessness and Passion")	2:45
10.	"Plavi golub" ("Blue Pigeon")	2:25
Total length:		35:05

== Personnel ==
Azra

- Branimir Štulić – Guitars, bass, lead vocals

Additional musicians

- Srećko Antonioli – Drums

Artwork

- Ivan Ivezić – Design

Production

- Branimir Štulić – Producer
- Siniša Škarica - Executive producer
- Recorded by Peter Siedlaczek
