= Jurica Pađen =

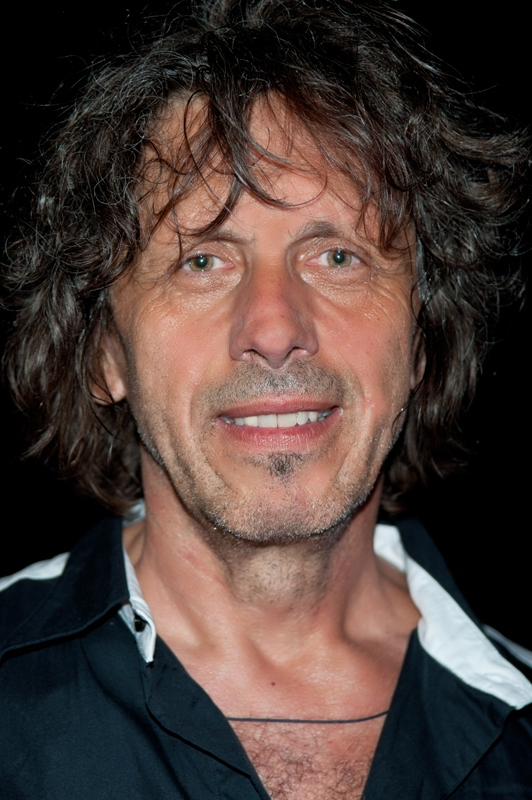
- Jurica Pađen in 2013

Background information
- Born: 3 February 1955 (age 71); Zagreb, PR Croatia, FPR Yugoslavia
- Genres: Rock; hard rock; boogie rock; progressive rock; new wave; pop rock
- Occupations: Guitarist, singer, songwriter, producer
- Instruments: Guitar, vocals
- Years active: 1974–present
- Labels: Jugoton, Croatia Records, Menart
- Formerly of: Grupa 220; Parni Valjak; Azra; Pađen Band; 4 Asa

Jurica Pađen (born 3 February 1955) is a Croatian and Yugoslav rock musician, known as the frontman and leader of Aerodrom and Pađen Band, as well as guitarist for the bands Grupa 220, Parni Valjak and Azra and a member of the supergroup 4 Asa.

Pađen started his career as a teenager, playing guitar in several Zagreb bands. In 1972, he became a member of the popular band Grupa 220, appearing on the group's second (and last) studio album. After Grupa 220 disbanded in 1975, Pađen and another former Grupa 220 member, Husein Hasanefendić "Hus", formed Parni Valjak. With Parni Valjak, Pađen recorded two studio albums, before leaving the group to form his own band, Aerodrom. Pađen was initially the guitarist and principal songwriter for Aerodrom, taking over the vocal duties with the departure of the band's original vocalist Zlatan Živković in 1982. Initially a progressive rock band, Aerodrom achieved nationwide popularity during the 1980s with their pop rock hits, disbanding in 1987. After Aerodrom ended their activity, Pađen joined the popular band Azra as a guitarist, recording a studio and a live album with the group, also taking part in the recording of Azra leader Branimir "Johnny" Štulić's two solo albums. During the 1990s, he fronted his Pađen Band, recording three studio albums with the group. He reunited Aerodrom in 2000, the band recording four studio albums and a live album since. Simultaneously with his work with reunited Aerodrom, he performed with the supergroup 4 Asa, composed of Vlado Kalember, Alen Islamović, Rajko Dujmić and himself, and recorded two solo albums of instrumental music.

== Biography ==
=== Early life and early career ===
Pađen was born in Zagreb on 3 February 1955. He grew up listening to The Beatles, their music encouraging him to enroll in a music school. He played classical guitar, and after graduating from lower music school, started composing his first rock and roll songs.

He started performing at the age of 15, as the guitarist for Zoo Band, later performing with the bands Spectrum and Hobo.

=== Grupa 220 (1972–1975) ===
In 1972, Pađen joined popular band Grupa 220, at the time composed of vocalist Drago Mlinarec, guitarist Husein Hasanefendić "Hus", drummer Ivan "Piko" Stančić, and bass guitarist Nenad Zubak. With the group, Pađen recorded their second and last studio album Slike (Images), released in 1975. The group disbanded soon after the album release.

=== Parni Valjak (1975–1978) ===
After Grupa 220 disbanded, Pađen and Hasanefendić formed Parni Valjak with vocalist Aki Rahimovski, bass guitarist Zlatko Miksić "Fuma" and drummer Srećko Antonioli. With Parni Valjak, Pađen recorded two studio albums, the band's 1976 debut Dođite na show! (Come to the Show!) and the 1977 album Glavom kroz zid (Head Against the Wall), debuting as a songwriter on Dođite na show!. In 1978, both Hasanefendić and Rahimovski were drafted to serve their mandatory stints in the Yugoslav People's Army, Parni Valjak going on hiatus and Pađen deciding to form a new band.

=== Aerodrom (1978–1987) ===
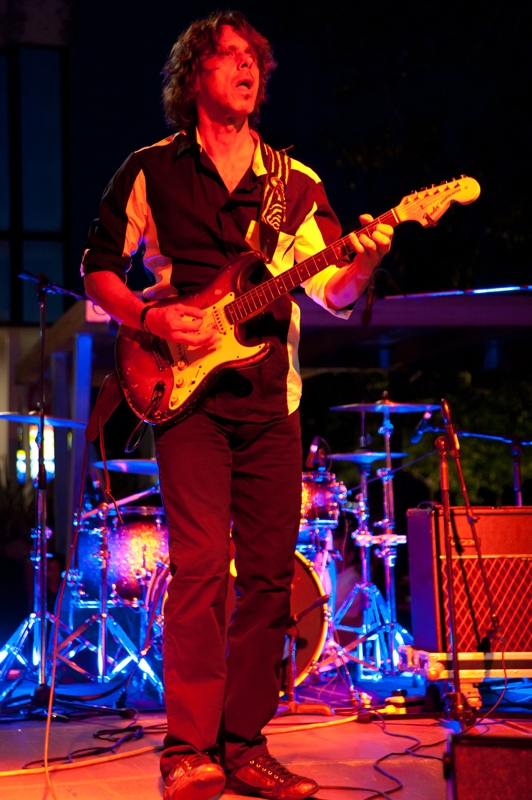
Pađen performing with Aerodrom in Crikvenica in 2013

Pađen formed Aerodrom in 1978 with vocalist Zlatan Živković, bass guitarist Remo Krstanović Cartagine, drummer Paolo Sfeci and keyboardist Mladen Krajnik. During the band's career, Pađen has been the group's principal songwriter. Initially, Aerodrom performed progressive rock, their 1979 debut Kad misli mi vrludaju bringing them attention of the public and the media. With the 1981 album Tango Bango, the group turned towards simpler, new wave-influenced sound, scoring several hits. After the album release, Živković left the band and the vocal duties were taken over by Pađen. Aerodrom's third studio album Obične ljubavne pjesme, released in 1983, was their biggest commercial success. Following Obične ljubavne pesme promotional tour, the band went on hiatus due to Pađen's mandatory stint in the Yugoslav army. Upon his return from the army in 1984, him and Cartagine joined Azra for the spring tour, and then reformed Aerodrom with drummer Nenad Smoljanović. The band released two more successful pop rock-oriented albums, the latter recorded in the lineup featuring Pađen on guitar and vocals, Cartagine on bass guitar and Živković—who had returned to the band in 1986—on vocals and drums. The group disbanded in 1987, Pađen continuing his career as guitarist in Azra.

=== Azra (1987–1990) ===
Pađen performed with Azra for the first time in the spring of 1984, when him and Aerodrom bass guitarist Remo Krstanović Cartagine were invited by Azra leader Branimir "Johnny" Štulić to join the band as touring musicians for the group's spring tour. After Aerodrom disbanded in 1987, Pađen joined Azra as a full-time member. With Azra he recorded the 1987 studio album Između krajnosti (Between Extremes) and the 1988 live album Zadovoljština (Satisfaction), also participating in the recording of Branimir Štulić's solo albums Balkanska rapsodija (Balkan Rhapsody, 1989) and Balegari ne vjeruju sreći (Dung Beetles Don't Believe in Luck, 1989). Pađen performed with Azra until the band's last concert, held on 15 August 1990 at Hvar.

=== Pađen Band (1993–2000) ===
In 1993, he formed his Pađen Band, the group releasing their debut Hamburger City during the same year. The album brought the hit song "Što si u kavu stavila" ("What Did You Put in My Coffee"), featuring a musical quotation from "Don't Let Me Be Misunderstood". The 1995 album Slatka mala stvar (Cute Little Thing) by the band featured the song "Goli prick" ("Naked Prick"), criticizing Branimir Štulić's lack of reaction to Croatian War of Independence. Pađen Band's last studio album, the 1997 Izbrisani grafiti (Erased Graffiti), brought the hits "Otkazani let" ("Cancelled Flight") and "Nevolja" ("Trouble"). The song "Samo da me draga ne ostavi" ("I Only Hope My Darling Won't Leave Me") from the album would receive large attention in 2020, with Croatian Composers' Society issuing a statement about "striking resemblance" between the song and Paul McCartney's 2018 song "Confidante" and speculations about Pađen suing McCartney appearing in Croatian media. Pađen Band's last release was the 2000 compilation album Retro 16.

=== Aerodrom reunion (2000–present) ===
Aerodrom reunited in 2000, featuring three original members, Pađen on guitar and vocals, Zlatan Živković on drums, Mladen Krajnik on keyboards, with addition of Tomislav Šojat on bass guitar. The band released their comeback album Na travi (On the Grass) in 2001, releasing three more studio albums since. The 2007 album Rock @ Roll was the band's first release to feature Pađen as the sole remaining original member. Since its release the group has been performing under the name Jurica Pađen & Aerodrom. In 2009, the band released their first live album, Hitovi i legende (Hits and Legends). The album was recorded on Jurica Pađen & Aerodrom concert in Tvornica kulture club in Zagreb held on 13 December 2008.

=== 4 Asa (2003–2004) ===
Simultaneously with his work with reunited Aerodrom, Pađen formed the supergroup 4 asa (4 Aces) with former Srebrna Krila vocalist and solo artist Vlado Kalember, former Divlje Jagode and Bijelo Dugme vocalist and solo artist Alen Islamović and Novi Fosili keyboardist and vocalist Rajko Dujmić, performing new versions of the band members' old songs. With the group, Pađen recorded studio albums Ljubavna priča iz Dubrovnika (Love Story from Dubrovnik, 2003) and Nakon svih ovih godina (After All These Years, 2004), and the double live album Live Zagreb 03. 03. 2003.. The DVD 4 Asa Live, released in 2003, featured the recording of their performance at Zagreb's Šalata.

=== Solo albums ===
Simultaneously with his work with reunited Aerodrom and with 4 Asa, Pađen has recorded two solo albums. In 2003, he released the album Žicanje (Wiring), featuring his instrumentals inspired by 1960s music, with Aerodrom bass guitarist Tomislav Šojat and the band's former bass guitarist Remo Krstanović Cartagine taking part in the recording. The album also featured Pađen's future wife Ana Šuto on keyboards and Nikša Bratoš on guitar. The album was awarded with Fender Award for the Best Croatian Instrumental Album. In 2013, Pađen released the solo album All Stars, featuring instrumental tracks he recorded with Branimir Štulić, Husein Hasanefendić, Nikša Bratoš, Massimo Savić, Vedran Božić, Neno Belan and Zele Lipovača.

=== Other activities ===
In 1991, at the time of the Croatian War, Pađen recorded the song "Tko to tamo gine" ("Who's That Dying Over There") for the various artists album Moja domovina (My Homeland), and a cover of Azra's "Balkan" entitled "Papan" (the title being a slang for an immature boy) for the various artists album Rock za Hrvatsku (Rock for Croatia). During war years, Pađen joined Croatian musicians who performed for Croatian troops.

=== Personal life ===
Jurica Pađen is married to singer and pianist Ana Šuto, a former singer of the group Ana i Dva Guna (Ana and Two Goons). The two met during the recording of Pađen's album Žicanje. They have been married since 2005 and have two children, son Vito and a daughter Mila. From a previous relationship, Pađen has one child, daughter Tara.

== Legacy ==
In 2000, Aerodrom song "Fratello" was polled No.87 on the Rock Express Top 100 Yugoslav Rock Songs of All Times list.

== Discography ==
=== With Grupa 220 ===
==== Studio albums ====
- Slike (1975)

=== With Parni Valjak ===
==== Studio albums ====
- Dođite na show! (1976)
- Glavom kroz zid (1977)

=== With Aerodrom ===
==== Studio albums ====
- Kad misli mi vrludaju (1979)
- Tango bango (1981)
- Obične ljubavne pjesme (1982)
- Dukat i pribadače (1984)
- Trojica u mraku (1986)
- Na travi (2001)
- Rock @ Roll (2007)
- Taktika noja (2012)
- Dnevni rituali (2019)

==== Live albums ====
- Hitovi i legende (2009)

==== Compilations ====
- Flash Back 1979-1986 (1996)
- The Ultimate Collection (2008)
- Greatest Hits (2020)

=== With Azra ===
==== Studio albums ====
- Između krajnosti (1987)
- Zadovoljština (1988)

=== With Branimir "Johnny" Štulić ===
==== Studio albums ====
- Balkanska rapsodija (1989)
- Balegari ne vjeruju sreći (1990)

=== With Pađen Band ===
==== Studio albums ====
- Hamburger City (1993)
- Slatka mala stvar (1995)
- Izbrisani grafiti (1997)

==== Compilations ====
- Retro 16 (2000)

=== With 4 Asa ===
==== Studio albums ====
- Ljubavna priča iz Dubrovnika (2003)
- Nakon svih ovih godina (2004)

==== Live albums ====
- Live Zagreb 03. 03. 2003. (2003)

==== Video albums ====
- 4 Asa Live (2003)

=== Solo ===
==== Studio albums ====
- Žicanje (2005)
- All Stars (2014)
