= Dnevni rituali =

Studio album by Aerodrom
- Released: 22 November 2019
- Recorded: October 2015 – October 2019
- Genre: Rock
- Length: 44:53
- Label: Croatia Records
- Producers: Jurica Pađen, Hrvoje Prskalo

Aerodrom chronology
Taktika noja (2012)	Dnevni rituali (2019)

Singles from Dnevni rituali
- 1. "Od sutra ne pušim" Released: 23 December 2015; 2. "Ispod tuša" Released: 8 December 2016; 3. "Ja te jednostavno volim" Released: 20 September 2017; 4. "Titanik" Released: 1 June 2018; 5. "Neka bude" Released: 24 September 2018; 6. "Sunce mi se smije" Released: 30 September 2019; 7. "Vozi, mademoiselle" Released: 7 April 2020; 8. "Nafte i benzina" Released: 3 November 2020

Dnevni rituali is the ninth studio album of the Croatian rock band Aerodrom, released through Croatia Records on 22 November 2019. The album is recorded by the same band members like their previous studio release Taktika noja. The album debuted at #21 on the official Croatian Top 40 chart and peaked at #8. Six singles were released from this album, "Od sutra ne pušim", "Ispod tuša", "Ja te jednostavno volim", which peaked at #13 and spent 12 weeks on the national Top 40 singles chart, "Titanik", "Neka bude", which debuted and peaked at #22 and "Sunce mi se smije", which debuted and peaked at #27.

== Critical reception ==
Dnevni rituali received generally positive reviews. Croatian rock critic Zlatko Gall gave the album three and a half stars on a five-star scale, describing it as a "really solid classic guitar rock album" and as a "band extension of Pađen's awarded solo project All Stars". Aleksandar Dragaš of Jutarnji list reviewed it as a "catchy arena rock / power pop album". Top.HR, a Croatian music chart television programme, presented the album as “a serious competitor for rock album of the year”.

== Track listing ==
All music and lyrics written by Jurica Pađen.

No.	Title	Length
1.	"Varka oko nas"	3:26
2.	"Nafte i benzina"	3:14
3.	"Sunce mi se smije"	3:48
4.	"Vozi, mademoiselle"	3:24
5.	"Živjeti svoj san"	2:53
6.	"Sva sirotinja"	2:46
7.	"Mistična dama"	4:02
8.	"Hej, bludnice"	3:29
9.	"Ja te jednostavno volim"	3:34
10.	"Neka bude"	3:56
11.	"Titanik"	3:47
12.	"Ispod tuša"	3:25
13.	"Od sutra ne pušim"	3:09
Total length:		44:53

== Charts ==
=== Album charts ===
Year	Chart	Peak position
2019	Croatian Albums Chart	8

=== Singles ===
Year	Single	Chart	Peak position
2017	Ja te jednostavno volim	Croatian Singles Chart	13
2018	Neka bude	Croatian Singles Chart	22
2019	Sunce mi se smije	Croatian Singles Chart	27

== Personnel ==
Aerodrom

- Jurica Pađen – Guitars, lead vocals, harmonica
- Tomislav Šojat – Bass, backup vocals
- Ivan Havidić – Guitars, backup vocals
- Damir Medić – Drums, percussions

Additional musicians

- Fedor Boić – Keyboards
- Mario Domazet – Charango, acoustic guitar
- Zvone Domazet – Dobro, slide guitar, programming
- Borna Čop – Guitars
- Ana Šuto, Jelena Vlačić – Backup vocals
- Hrvoje Prskalo - Programming, backup vocals, synth, scream

Artwork

- Ljubo Zdjelarević – Photography and design
- Luka Vucić – Design

Production

- Jurica Pađen – Producer
- Hrvoje Prskalo – Producer
- Mario Domazet - Coproducer on tracks 3 and 10
- Recorded by Hrvoje Prskalo
