= 4 asa =

Croatian supergroup

- Origin: Zagreb, Croatia
- Genres: rock, pop
- Years active: 2002-2005, 2008, 2020, 2022–present
- Labels: Memphis Zagreb, Croatia Records
- Members: Vlado Kalember; Alen Islamović; Jurica Pađen
- Past members: Rajko Dujmić

4 asa (lit. '4 aces') is a Croatian music group. It was founded in the early 2000s in Zagreb. The members are actually frontmen of Yugoslav and Croatian bands: Rajko Dujmić (Novi fosili), Vlado Kalember (Srebrna krila), Jurica Pađen (Aerodrom) and Alen Islamović (Divlje jagode and Bijelo dugme).

In the 2020s, they returned to the stage, but Dujmić died in the meantime. In 2022, they signed a contract with Croatia Records, in order to release a double album the following year.

== History ==
In 2003, they held concerts in Zagreb (one in March and one in September). Recordings from the concert were released on a double live album. Before the first concert in Zagreb, news circulated that the characters of the members would be on the packaging of a chocolate bar in Serbia. In the same year, they released an album of the same name. During the summer of 2003, they toured the Croatian Adriatic, and the sponsor was Večernji list.

In 2004, they released the album Nakon svih ovih godina and toured in Belgrade. In 2005, they participated in Dora, but they didn't go any further. In 2008 group held concert in Subotica.

In 2020, they last performed in full. At the beginning of August, Dujmić died, so the break lasted until the group signed a contract with Croatia Records. On the third anniversary of Dujmić's death, on August 4, 2023, the group released a double album of the same name (sometimes called as Legendarni album). A few days before the official release, the songs were uploaded on streaming platforms.
