= Rock @ Roll =

Studio album by Aerodrom
- Released: 2007
- Recorded: 2007; Kod Jure Studio (Zagreb, Croatia); Kod Smokve Studio (Zagreb, Croatia)
- Genre: Rock
- Length: 40:52
- Label: Croatia Records
- Producer: Jurica Pađen; Tomislav Šojat; Dragutin Smokrović 'Smokva'

Aerodrom chronology
Na travi (2001)	Rock @ Roll (2007)	The Ultimate Collection (2008)

Singles from Rock @ Roll
- 1. "Mili moj anđele" Released: 2007; 2. "Tvoj pas me čudno gleda" Released: 2008; 3. "Kći starog vodeničara" Released: 2008; 4. "Odma mi je zapela za oko" Released: 2009

Rock @ Roll is the seventh album by the Croatian rock band Aerodrom, released through Croatia Records in 2007. The album marked the band's 30th anniversary, which they celebrated at a New Year's Eve concert in Ban Jelačić Square in Zagreb. Jurica Pađen wrote all of the music and lyrics, except for "Fait Accompli", a song co-written with Branimir Štulić and dedicated to John Lennon. Rock @ Roll was recorded as a trio with new drummer Slavko Pintarić 'Pišta'. The album included four new singles, "Mili moj anđele", "Tvoj pas me čudno gleda", "Kći starog vodeničara" and "Odma mi je zapela za oko".

== Track listing ==
All music and lyrics written by Jurica Pađen, except track 12 music by Jurica Pađen and Branimir Štulić, all arrangements by Aerodrom.

No.	Title	Length
1.	"Mili moj anđele"	3:35
2.	"Tvoj pas me čudno gleda"	3:02
3.	"Nema više druga Tita"	3:43
4.	"Odma mi je zapela za oko"	4:10
5.	"Što će nama peć"	4:04
6.	"Kći starog vodeničara"	3:34
7.	"Rock@Roll"	3:08
8.	"Osama"	3:04
9.	"Nije meni žao"	2:40
10.	"Sretna vremena"	3:38
11.	"Samo se ovce nadaju"	3:25
12.	"Fait Accompli"	2:49
Total length:		40:52

== Personnel ==
Aerodrom

- Jurica Pađen – Guitars, lead vocals
- Tomislav Šojat – Bass, backup vocals
- Slavko Pintarić 'Pišta' – Drums

Additional musicians

- Zlatan Živković - Keyboards
- Zlatan Došlić - Keyboards
- Zdravko Tabain - Drums in track 10

Artwork

- Igor 'CC' Kelčec - Photography and design

Production

- Jurica Pađen – Producer
- Tomislav Šojat - Producer
- Dragutin Smokrović 'Smokva' - Producer
- Recorded by Dragutin Smokrović 'Smokva'
