= Olujić =

Olujić (Serbian Cyrillic: Олујић) is a surname found in Serbia and Croatia. Notable people with the surname include:

- Grozdana Olujić (1934–2019), Serbian writer, translator, editor, and critic
- Krunoslav Olujić (born 1952), Croatian attorney
- Tatjana Olujić, Serbian violinist and university professor
