= Ravno do dna =

Live album by Azra
- Released: March 1982
- Recorded: 21 October 1981
- Venue: Kulušić (Zagreb, SR Croatia, SFR Yugoslavia)
- Genre: Rock, new wave
- Length: 2:00:37
- Label: Jugoton, Azra Music
- Producer: Branimir Štulić

Azra chronology
Sunčana strana ulice (1981)	Ravno do dna (1982)	Filigranski pločnici (1982)

Ravno do dna is a live album of the Yugoslavian rock band Azra, released through Jugoton in 1982 on triple vinyl. It was recorded in club Kulušić, Zagreb on October 21, 1981.

Ravno do dna has been described as the best live album in the history of Yugoslav rock music. It placed sixth in the list of 100 greatest Yugoslav rock albums, compiled by the Croatian edition of the Rolling Stone magazine in 2015.

== Track listing ==
All music and lyrics written by Branimir Štulić, except track 13 lyrics by Mile Rupčić.

Side one
No.	Title	Length
1.	"Uradi nešto"	3:18
2.	"Poziv na ples"	2:21
3.	"Tople usne žene"	2:46
4.	"Iggy Pop"	3:32
5.	"Bankrot mama"	1:29
6.	"A šta da radim"	2:40
7.	"Lijepe žene prolaze kroz grad"	2:19
8.	"Plavo - smeđe"	2:09

Side two
No.	Title	Length
9.	"Reket roll iz Šume Striborove"	2:44
10.	"Vrijeme odluke"	2:54
11.	"Nemoj po glavi d.p."	1:15
12.	"Vrata podzemnih voda"	3:20
13.	"Pit... i to je Amerika"	2:43
14.	"Grad bez ljubavi"	1:14
15.	"Svjetska lada"	2:46
16.	"Kad Miki kaže da se boji"	2:25

Side three
No.	Title	Length
17.	"Pametni i knjiški ljudi"	3:16
18.	"Jablan"	2:15
19.	"Sestra Lovel 1984"	2:22
20.	"Suzy F. (Kada vidim Beč)"	1:41
21.	"Ne želim ništa loše da ti uradim"	2:27
22.	"Marina"	2:34
23.	"Prokleto ljut"	2:13
24.	"Sjaj u kosi"	1:46

Side four
No.	Title	Length
25.	"Ne mogu pomoći nikome od nas"	2:11
26.	"Ostavi me nasamo"	3:01
27.	"Đoni, budi dobar"	2:42
28.	"Fa fa fa"	1:42
29.	"Gracija"	3:04
30.	"Provedimo vikend zajedno"	1:58
31.	"Visoko iznad vlakova"	3:11
32.	"Teško vrijeme"	3:26

Side five
No.	Title	Length
33.	"Ravno do dna"	3:51
34.	"Nedjeljni komentar"	3:31
35.	"Rođen da budem šonjo"	3:07
36.	"Poljubi me..."	2:45
37.	"Poljska u mome srcu"	2:33
38.	"Kurvini sinovi"	3:00

Side six
No.	Title	Length
39.	"Uvijek ista priča"	2:40
40.	"Krvava Meri"	2:25
41.	"Užas je moja furka"	2:58
42.	"Balkan"	3:08
43.	"Odlazak u noć"	5:54
44.	"Obrati pažnju na posljednju stvar"	4:58
Total length:		2:00:37

== Personnel ==
Azra

- Branimir Štulić – Guitars, lead vocals
- Mišo Hrnjak – Bass
- Boris Leiner – Drums

Artwork

- Ivan Ivezić – Design
- Davor Šarić - Photography

Production

- Branimir Štulić – Producer
- Siniša Škarica - Executive producer
- Mladen Škalec - Sound technician

== Charts ==
Weekly chart performance for Ravno do dna
Chart (2022)	Peak position
Croatian Domestic Albums (HDU)	1

Chart (2024)	Peak position
Croatian Domestic Albums (HDU)	1
