= Filigranski pločnici =

Studio album by Azra
- Released: 7 June 1982
- Recorded: March–April 1982
- Studios: Kod Trulog (Zagreb, SR Croatia, SFR Yugoslavia)
- Genre: New wave
- Length: 88:35
- Labels: Jugoton, Azra Music
- Producer: Branimir Štulić

Azra chronology
Ravno do dna (1982)	Filigranski pločnici (1982)	Singl ploče 1979–1982 (1982)

Filigranski pločnici (Croatian for "Filigree Pavements") is the third studio album of the Yugoslavian rock band Azra, released through Jugoton in 1982 on double vinyl.

Filigranski pločnici placed 8th in YU 100: najbolji albumi jugoslovenske rok i pop muzike a list of 100 best Yugoslav pop and rock albums, compiled by 70 Serbian rock critics in 1998.

== Track listing ==
All music and lyrics written by Branimir Štulić.

Side one
No.	Title	Length
1.	"Tko to tamo pjeva" ("Who's Singing Over There")	2:45
2.	"'68"	4:23
3.	"Volim te kad pričaš" ("I Like You When You Talk")	2:15
4.	"Ne prodajem nasmiješenog psa" ("I'm Not Selling a Smiling Dog")	3:08
5.	"Proljeće je 13. u decembru" ("It's the 13th Spring in December")	4:30
6.	"Ako znaš bilo što" ("If You Know Anything")	4:15

Side two
No.	Title	Length
7.	"Ljudi samoće" ("People of Loneliness")	3:20
8.	"Strah od smrti" ("Fear of Death")	3:16
9.	"Roll Over Jura"	3:15
10.	"Naizgled lijepa" ("Seemingly Beautiful")	5:21
11.	"Hladan kao led" ("Cold as Ice")	2:55
12.	"I nikom nije ljepše neg' je nam" ("And Nobody Has It Better Than Us")	2:52
13.	"Iran"	1:56

Side three
No.	Title	Length
14.	"Čudne navike" ("Strange Habits")	3:33
15.	"Nije O. K." ("It's Not OK")	2:07
16.	"Tanka crna linija" ("Thin Black Line")	2:30
17.	"Pavel" ("Paul")	3:13
18.	"Gomila nesklada" ("A Bunch of Junk")	2:20
19.	"Slučajan susret" ("Accidental Meeting")	3:00
20.	"Kao ti i ja" ("Like You And Me")	5:35

Side four
No.	Title	Length
21.	"Put za Katmandu" ("Road to Kathmandu")	2:55
22.	"Strankinja sa plavi Eyes" ("Foreigner For Blue Eyes")	3:45
23.	"Život običnog tempa" ("A Life Of a Regular Tempo")	3:00
24.	"Hladni prsti" ("Cold Fingers")	2:40
25.	"32-956"	2:26
26.	"Gorki okus" ("Bitter Taste")	3:09
27.	"Filigranski pločnici" ("Filigree Pavements")	3:45
Total length:		1:28:35

== Personnel ==
Azra

- Branimir Štulić – Guitars, lead vocals
- Mišo Hrnjak – Bass, backup vocals, piano in track 10
- Boris Leiner – Drums, backup vocals, lead vocals in track 4

Additional musicians

- Miroslav Sedak-Benčić - Saxophone, flute, organ, piano

Artwork

- Ivan Ivezić – Design
- Milisav Vesović - Photography

Production

- Branimir Štulić – Producer
- Siniša Škarica - Executive producer
- Recorded by Janko Mlinarić
