= List of number-one singles of 2024 (Croatia) =

This is a list of the Croatian number-one singles of 2024 as compiled by Croatia Songs, part of Hits of the World Billboard chart series, provided by Billboard.

Number-one singles, showing issue date, song and artist names
No.	Issue date	Song	Artist(s)	Ref.
28	6 January 2024	"Jao mama"	Coby and Rouzi	
28	13 January 2024	"Jao mama"	Coby and Rouzi	
28	20 January 2024	"Jao mama"	Coby and Rouzi	
28	27 January 2024	"Jao mama"	Coby and Rouzi	
29	3 February 2024	"Sve si znala"	Relja	
30	10 February 2024	"Naslovna"	Amna and Biba	
31	17 February 2024	"Fantazija"	Grše and Miach	
31	24 February 2024	"Fantazija"	Grše and Miach	
31	2 March 2024	"Fantazija"	Grše and Miach	
31	9 March 2024	"Fantazija"	Grše and Miach	
31	16 March 2024	"Fantazija"	Grše and Miach	
31	23 March 2024	"Fantazija"	Grše and Miach	
31	30 March 2024	"Fantazija"	Grše and Miach	
31	6 April 2024	"Fantazija"	Grše and Miach	
31	13 April 2024	"Fantazija"	Grše and Miach	
31	20 April 2024	"Fantazija"	Grše and Miach	
31	27 April 2024	"Fantazija"	Grše and Miach	
31	4 May 2024	"Fantazija"	Grše and Miach	
31	11 May 2024	"Fantazija"	Grše and Miach	
31	18 May 2024	"Fantazija"	Grše and Miach	
32	25 May 2024	"Rim Tim Tagi Dim"	Baby Lasagna	
33	1 June 2024	"Ankaran"	Hiljson Mandela featuring Biba	
33	8 June 2024	"Ankaran"	Hiljson Mandela featuring Biba	
33	15 June 2024	"Ankaran"	Hiljson Mandela featuring Biba	
33	22 June 2024	"Ankaran"	Hiljson Mandela featuring Biba	
34	29 June 2024	"Forza"	Grše	
34	6 July 2024	"Forza"	Grše	
34	13 July 2024	"Forza"	Grše	
34	20 July 2024	"Forza"	Grše	
34	27 July 2024	"Forza"	Grše	
34	3 August 2024	"Forza"	Grše	
34	10 August 2024	"Forza"	Grše	
34	17 August 2024	"Forza"	Grše	
34	24 August 2024	"Forza"	Grše	
34	31 August 2024	"Forza"	Grše	
34	7 September 2024	"Forza"	Grše	
34	14 September 2024	"Forza"	Grše	
35	21 September 2024	"Bez koda"	Jala Brat and Buba Corelli	
35	28 September 2024	"Bez koda"	Jala Brat and Buba Corelli	
35	5 October 2024	"Bez koda"	Jala Brat and Buba Corelli	
35	12 October 2024	"Bez koda"	Jala Brat and Buba Corelli	
35	19 October 2024	"Bez koda"	Jala Brat and Buba Corelli	
36	26 October 2024	"Hi Hi - Ha Ha"	Nucci, Biba and Devito	
36	2 November 2024	"Hi Hi - Ha Ha"	Nucci, Biba and Devito	
36	9 November 2024	"Hi Hi - Ha Ha"	Nucci, Biba and Devito	
re	16 November 2024	"Bez koda"	Jala Brat and Buba Corelli	
37	23 November 2024	"Anđeo"	Hiljson Mandela and Miach	
37	30 November 2024	"Anđeo"	Hiljson Mandela and Miach	
37	7 December 2024	"Anđeo"	Hiljson Mandela and Miach	
37	14 December 2024	"Anđeo"	Hiljson Mandela and Miach	
37	21 December 2024	"Anđeo"	Hiljson Mandela and Miach	
38	28 December 2024	"Blaka, blaka"	Jala Brat and Buba Corelli featuring Elena	

== Number-one artists of 2024 ==
List of number-one artists by total weeks at number one
Position	Artist	Weeks at No. 1
1	Grše	26
2	Miach	19
3	Hiljson Mandela	9
4	Biba	8
5	Buba Corelli	7
5	Jala Brat	7
7	Rouzi	4
7	Coby	4
9	Devito	3
10	Amna	1
10	Baby Lasagna	1
10	Elena	1
10	Relja	1

== See also ==
- List of number-one albums of 2024 (Croatia)
