= Obične ljubavne pjesme =

Studio album by Aerodrom
- Released: 1982
- Recorded: February 1982 – March 1982; Tira Recording Studio (Torsby, Sweden)
- Genre: Rock, new wave, pop rock
- Length: 33:13
- Label: Jugoton
- Producer: Tini Varga

Aerodrom chronology
Tango Bango (1981)	Obične ljubavne pjesme (1982)	Dukat i pribadače (1984)

Singles from Obične ljubavne pjesme
- 1. "Obična ljubavna pjesma" Released: 1982; 2. "Kad je sa mnom kvari sve" Released: 1982; 3. "Stranac" Released: 1982

Obične ljubavne pjesme is the third album by Croatian rock band Aerodrom, released through Jugoton in 1982. This is the first album that introduces Jurica Pađen as main vocalist, a role he continues to maintain. The album contains their greatest single, Obična ljubavna pjesma, which brought the band national success.

== Track listing ==
All lyrics written by Jurica Pađen, all arrangements by Aerodrom and Tini Varga

Side one
No.	Title	Music	Length
1.	"Obična ljubavna pjesma"	Jurica Pađen	5:09
2.	"Sutra bit će bolje"	Remo Cartagine	3:51
3.	"Za sve su krive žene"	Jurica Pađen	4:12
4.	"Snovi"	Jurica Pađen	3:37

Side two
No.	Title	Music	Length
5.	"Kad je sa mnom kvari sve"	Jurica Pađen	2:51
6.	"Muški stroj"	Jurica Pađen	3:32
7.	"Ne mogu tako"	Jurica Pađen	3:04
8.	"Stranac"	Jurica Pađen	3:07
9.	"Odlazim"	Jurica Pađen	3:51
Total length:			33:13

== Personnel ==
Aerodrom

- Jurica Pađen – Guitars, lead vocals
- Remo Cartagine – Bass, backup vocals
- Zoran Kraš – Keyboards, backup vocals
- Branko Knežević – Drums, percussion, backup vocals

Additional musicians

- Ulf Andersson – Saxophone
- Tini Varga – Guitars, drum machine programming, effects, synthesizer, backup vocals

Artwork

- Dražen Kalenić – Design

Production

- Tini Varga – Producer
- Recorded by Tini Varga
