= Sunčana strana ulice =

Studio album by Azra
- Released: June 1981
- Recorded: February – March 1981; MM Studio (Zagreb, SR Croatia)
- Genre: New wave
- Length: 1:00:55
- Label: Jugoton
- Producer: Branimir Štulić

Azra chronology
| Azra (1980) | Sunčana strana ulice (1981) | Ravno do dna (1982) |

Sunčana strana ulice is the second studio album by the rock band Azra, released through Jugoton in 1981 on double vinyl.

In a list of top 100 Yugoslav rock albums compiled by the Croatian edition of the Rolling Stone magazine in 2015, Sunčana strana ulice placed first among albums by Croatian artists and third overall.

== Track listing ==
All music and lyrics written by Branimir Štulić, except track 11 lyrics by Mile Rupčić.

Side one
| No. | Title | Length |
|---|---|---|
| 1. | "041" | 1:29 |
| 2. | "Užas je moja furka" ("Horror Is my Thing") | 3:14 |
| 3. | "Fa-fa-fa" | 1:51 |
| 4. | "Kipo" ("Statue") | 1:35 |
| 5. | "Ne reci mi dvaput" ("Don't Tell Me Twice") | 2:42 |
| 6. | "Provedimo vikend zajedno" ("Let's Spend the Weekend Together") | 2:04 |

Side two
| No. | Title | Length |
|---|---|---|
| 7. | "Kurvini sinovi" ("Sons of a Bitch") | 3:31 |
| 8. | "Bankrot mama" ("Bankrupt Mom") | 1:36 |
| 9. | "Pametni i knjiški ljudi" ("Smart and Bookish People") | 3:21 |
| 10. | "Kad Miki kaže da se boji" ("When Miki Says He's Afraid") | 3:06 |
| 11. | "Pit... i to je Amerika" ("Pete... And That's America") | 3:06 |
| 12. | "Daleko od istine" ("Far From the Truth") | 2:17 |

Side three
| No. | Title | Length |
|---|---|---|
| 13. | "Poljska u mom srcu" ("Poland In My Heart") | 3:31 |
| 14. | "Suzi F. (Kada vidim Beč)" ("Suzy F. (When I See Vienna)") | 1:53 |
| 15. | "Između nas" ("Between Us") | 2:37 |
| 16. | "Nemoj po glavi D.P." ("Don't Hit D.P. on the Head") | 1:25 |
| 17. | "Gospodar samoće" ("Master of Loneliness") | 1:37 |
| 18. | "Poljubi me" ("Kiss Me") | 3:34 |

Side four
| No. | Title | Length |
|---|---|---|
| 19. | "Karta za sreću" ("Ticket For Happiness") | 2:59 |
| 20. | "Uvijek ista priča" ("Always the Same Story") | 3:20 |
| 21. | "Sunčana strana ulice" ("Sunny Side Of the Street") | 2:01 |
| 22. | "Grad bez ljubavi" ("City Without Love") | 1:21 |
| 23. | "Nedjelja popodne" ("Sunday Afternoon") | 2:39 |
| 24. | "Odlazak u noć" ("Leaving For the Night") | 4:14 |
| Total length: | | 1:00:55 |

== Personnel ==
Azra

- Branimir Štulić – Guitars, lead vocals
- Mišo Hrnjak – Bass, lead vocals in track 20
- Boris Leiner – Drums, lead vocals in tracks 6 and 14

Additional musicians

- Miroslav Sedak-Benčić - Saxophone in tracks 2, 15 and 23
- Franjo Vlahović - Trumpet and trombone in track 15
- Nikola Santro - Trombone in track 15
- Mladen Juričić - Harmonica in track 11
- Tata, Truli - Backup vocals

Artwork

- Davor Mindoljević – Design and cover art

Production

- Branimir Štulić – Producer
- Siniša Škarica - Executive producer
- Recorded by Janko Mlinarić
