= Azra (album) =

Studio album by Azra
- Released: 1980
- Recorded: March – April 1980; Jadran Film Studio (Zagreb, SR Croatia)
- Genre: New wave
- Length: 39:06
- Label: Jugoton
- Producer: Drago Mlinarec

Azra chronology
Azra (1980)	Sunčana strana ulice (1981)

Azra is the debut album by the Yugoslav rock band Azra, released through Jugoton in 1980.

In a list of top 100 Yugoslav rock albums compiled by the Croatian edition of the Rolling Stone magazine in 2015, Azra placed ninth.

== Track listing ==
All music and lyrics written by Branimir Štulić.

Side one
No.	Title	Length
1.	"Jablan" ("Poplar")	2:33
2.	"Uradi nešto" ("Do Something")	3:17
3.	"Teško vrijeme" ("Hard Time")	3:49
4.	"Tople usne žene" ("Warm Mouth Of a Woman")	3:02
5.	"Vrijeme odluke" ("Time of Decision")	3:31
6.	"Gracija" ("Grace")	2:45

Side two
No.	Title	Length
7.	"Krvava Meri" ("Bloody Mary")	3:03
8.	"Marina"	3:03
9.	"Ne mogu pomoći nikome od nas" ("I Can't Help Anyone of Us")	3:50
10.	"Iggy Pop"	3:48
11.	"Žena drugog sistema" ("Woman of a Different System")	2:50
12.	"Obrati pažnju na posljednju stvar" ("Pay Attention to the Last Thing")	3:33
Total length:		39:06

== Personnel ==
Azra

- Branimir Štulić – Guitars, lead vocals
- Mišo Hrnjak – Bass
- Boris Leiner – Drums

Additional musicians

- Džimi, Harma, Gec, duo Baraccude – Backup vocals
- Gec - Harmonica in track 2

Artwork

- Jasmin Krpan – Design and photography
- Martin Krun (Krunoslav Martinčević )– Logo

Production

- Drago Mlinarec – Producer
- Miljenko Grasso - Assistant engineer
- Siniša Škarica - Executive producer
- Recorded by Franjo Berner
