= Taktika noja =

Studio album by Aerodrom
- Released: 3 December 2012
- Recorded: April 2011 – March 2012; ZG Zvuk Studio (Zagreb, Croatia)
- Genre: Rock
- Length: 49:29
- Label: Menart
- Producer: Jurica Pađen, Tomislav Šojat

Aerodrom chronology
Hitovi i legende (2009)	Taktika noja (2012)	Dnevni rituali (2019)

Singles from Taktika noja
- 1. "Loše volje" Released: 28 May 2011; 2. "Ostani" Released: 14 July 2011; 3. "Duh je nestao" Released: 4 May 2012; 4. "Dovela si me u red" Released: 26 November 2012; 5. "Široko ti bilo polje" Released: 22 March 2013; 6. "Teška vibra" Released: 20 November 2013; 7. "Mila moja" Released: 28 May 2014

Taktika noja is the eighth album of the Croatian rock band Aerodrom, released through Menart Records on 3 December 2012. The album debuted at #23 on the official Croatian Top 40 chart and peaked at #13 in the next week. Two new members performed on the record, guitarist Ivan Havidić (also performed on live album Hitovi i legende) and drummer Damir Medić. Seven singles were released from this album, "Loše volje", "Ostani", "Duh je nestao", which peaked at #8 on the national Top 20 singles chart, "Dovela si me u red", "Široko ti bilo polje", which debuted at #5 of the newly established national HR Top 40 singles chart, "Teška vibra", which debuted at #38 and peaked at #9 and "Mila Moja", which was released in May 2014 and peaked on Top 40 list at #14.

== Track listing ==
All music and lyrics written by Jurica Pađen, all arrangements by Aerodrom.

No.	Title	Length
1.	"Taktika noja"	3:10
2.	"Mila moja"	3:22
3.	"Dovela si me u red"	2:54
4.	"Široko ti bilo polje"	4:24
5.	"Totalni lom"	4:17
6.	"Ajmo ljudi"	2:50
7.	"Luda kuja"	3:49
8.	"Teška vibra"	4:00
9.	"Zombi-Zombi"	3:38
10.	"Ostani"	3:59
11.	"Duh je nestao"	4:10
12.	"Loše volje"	3:45
13.	"Vrata vremena"	5:11
Total length:		49:29

== Charts ==
=== Album charts ===
Year	Chart	Peak position
2012	Croatian Albums Chart	13

=== Singles charts ===
Year	Single	Chart	Peak position
2012	Dovela si me u red	HR Top 20	8
2013	Široko ti bilo polje	Croatian Singles Chart	5
2013	Teška vibra	Croatian Singles Chart	9
2014	Mila moja	Croatian Singles Chart	14

== Personnel ==
Aerodrom

- Jurica Pađen – Guitars, lead vocals
- Tomislav Šojat – Bass, backup vocals
- Ivan Havidić – Guitars, backup vocals
- Damir Medić – Drums, percussions, backup vocals

Additional musicians

- Fedor Boić – Keyboards
- Zlatan Došlić – Keyboards in track 12
- Davor Rodik – Pedal steel guitar in track 2
- Mario Rucner – Viola in track 6
- Ana Šuto, Lara Antić, Hrvoje Prskalo – Backup vocals

Artwork

- Ljubo Zdjelarević – Photography and design
- Tomislav Tomić – Illustration

Production

- Jurica Pađen – Producer
- Tomislav Šojat – Producer
- Hrvoje Prskalo – Coproducer
- Recorded by Hrvoje Prskalo
