= Trojica u mraku =

Studio album by Aerodrom
- Released: 1986
- Recorded: July 1986; SIM Studio (Zagreb, Croatia)
- Genre: Rock
- Length: 35:38
- Label: Jugoton
- Producer: Jurica Pađen

Aerodrom chronology
| Dukat i pribadače (1984) | Trojica u mraku (1986) | Flash Back 1979-1986 (1996) |

Singles from Dukat i pribadače
- 1. "Zagreb, Ljubljana i Beograd" Released: 1986; 2. "Pozdrav s Bardo ravni" Released: 1986

Trojica u mraku is the fifth album of the Croatian rock band Aerodrom, released through Jugoton in 1986. The album was named after the comic book drawn by Andrija Maurović and introduced band's frontman Jurica Pađen as a producer, with an intent to bring Aerodrom's sound back to rock. The band recorded as a trio, with Zlatan Živković returning, this time on drums. Trojica u mraku did not produce any successful singles and the band broke up several months after the album was released. It was their last album until the reunion in 2000.

== Track listing ==
All music and lyrics written by Jurica Pađen, all arrangements by Aerodrom.

Side one
| No. | Title | Length |
|---|---|---|
| 1. | "Vatra je na nebu" | 3:08 |
| 2. | "Metar vina" | 3:10 |
| 3. | "Eat a shit" | 3:10 |
| 4. | "Zagreb, Ljubljana i Beograd" | 4:25 |
| 5. | "Razbi sve satove" | 3:36 |

Side two
| No. | Title | Length |
|---|---|---|
| 6. | "Pogrešan dan" | 2:52 |
| 7. | "Ljubav nije knjiga" | 3:53 |
| 8. | "Šutnja" | 4:24 |
| 9. | "Fina porodica" | 1:46 |
| 10. | "Pozdrav s Bardo ravni" | 5:14 |
| Total length: | | 35:38 |

== Personnel ==
Aerodrom

- Jurica Pađen – Guitars, lead vocals
- Remo Cartagine – Bass
- Zlatan Živković – Drums, vocals

Additional musicians

- Laza Ristovski – Keyboards
- Senad Galijašević – Gong
- Miroslav Sedak-Benčić – Saxophone
- Ante Dropuljić – Trumpet
- Herbert Stenzel – Trombone

Artwork

- Dražen Kalenić – Photography and design

Production

- Jurica Pađen – Producer, except track 7 produced by Dragan Čačinović 'Čač'
- Siniša Škarica – Executive producer
- Recorded by Dragan Čačinović 'Čač'
