= Hrana za golubove =

Studio album by Film
- Released: 1992
- Studio: Studio Rockoko/J.M. Sound Studios (both Zagreb)
- Genre: Croatian pop
- Label: Croatia Records
- Producer: Nikša Bratoš

Film chronology
| Zemlja sreće (1989) | Hrana za golubove (1992) |

Hrana za golubove (English: Food for Doves) was the last studio album by Film, led by singer Jura Stublić. It was released in 1992 during the Croatian War of Independence. The album contained many patriotic and anti-war themes as well as the usual pop fare. All songs were written by Jura Stublić and Nikša Bratoš.

The album's first track "Radio ljubav" spoke about love in the media, in what was then a state of war in Croatia. "E moj druže beogradski" dealt with the end of Yugoslavia and the emptiness of its promises of unity. "Dođi gola, dođi bosa" was a love song. "Dom" was another song deeply influence by the war, as the song spoke about the sanctity of one's home. "Bili cvitak" was sung from the perspective of a Croatian soldier. The song's chorus, "A white flower in memory, an eternal love. For my people and for you, I had to die" was one of the most significant musically of the Croatian war period.

"E moj druže beogradski" and "Bili cvitak" were the album's biggest hits due to their patriotic, but pacifist, content.

== Track listing ==
1. Radio ljubav (Radio love)
2. E moj druže beogradski (Hey, my comrade from Belgrade)
3. Dođi gola, dođi bosa (Come naked, come barefoot)
4. Mog anđela više nema (My angel is not around)
5. Kćeri moja i sestrice (My daughters and sisters)
6. Grade, grade (City, City)
7. Gdje sam bio (Where was I)
8. Dom (Home)
9. Bili cvitak (A White Flower)
10. Golubove hranim (Feeding Doves)

== Sources ==
- Hrana za golubove (in Croatian)
