= Jura Stublić =

Croatian singer-songwriter

- Born: Jurislav Stublić; 19 December 1953 (age 72); Sarajevo, PR Bosnia and Herzegovina, FPR Yugoslavia
- Genres: Punk rock; new wave; ska; rock; pop rock
- Occupations: Singer, songwriter
- Instruments: Vocals, guitar
- Years active: 1978–present
- Labels: Suzy; Helidon; Jugoton; Croatia Records
- Formerly of: Azra

Jurislav "Jura" Stublić (born 19 December 1953) is a Croatian and Yugoslav singer and songwriter, best known as the frontman of the popular rock band Film.

Stublić started his career in 1978 as vocalist for the band Azra. After only several months, Stublić and other Azra members left the group to form Film. The group soon gained popularity and the attention of the media, establishing themselves as one of the most prominent acts of the Yugoslav new wave scene. By the mid-1980s, the group had turned towards more commercial rock sound, enjoying large mainstream popularity in Yugoslavia. After the original incarnation of the band split up in 1986, Stublić remained the only original member of the group, which continued its activity under the name Jura Stublić & Film.

== Biography ==
=== Early life ===
Stublić's father was an opera singer, so as a child Stublić often visited theatre and opera. At the age of 13 he started playing the guitar, earning money as a street performer at seaside resorts. He enrolled in the studies of psychology and later of sociology, but never graduated from any of the two. According to his own claims, he spent some time in Germany working as a lumberjack.

=== Azra (1978) ===
In 1978, without having much stage experience, Stublić was spotted by Branimir "Johnny" Štulić, the leader of Zagreb-based band Azra and recruited as Azra vocalist. Prior to joining Azra, Stublić was also considered by the members of Aerodrom as their new frontman, but eventually they opted not to include him in the lineup due to his deep vocals. The Azra lineup featuring Stublić functioned for a few months only, and after a quarrel with Štulić, in early 1979, Stublić, guitarist Mladen Juričić, bass guitarist Marino Pelajić and drummer Branko Hromatko all left Azra to form a new band.

=== Film, Jura Stublić & Film (1979–present) ===
Stublić, Juričić, Pelajić and Hromatko formed Film in early 1979. The four were soon joined by saxophonist Jurij Novoselić. The group gained the attention of the Yugoslav public and the media as a live act. Their debut album Novo! Novo! Još jučer samo na filmu a sada i u vašoj glavi (Extra! Extra! Extra! Yesterday Only on Film and Now Also in Your Head), recorded with the new drummer Ivan "Piko" Stančić and released in 1981, launched them to the top of the Yugoslav rock scene, the group establishing themselves as one of the most prominent acts of the Yugoslav new wave scene. With their following studio releases the band moved towards more mainstream rock sound, maintaining their popularity and scoring a number of hit songs. Despite the commercial and critical success, the original incarnation of the group split up in 1986, after releasing four studio and one live album, due to long-time disagreements about future musical direction between Stublić and the rest of the members. Stublić would continue with a backing band, performing under the name Jura Stublić & Film, releasing two successful pop rock-oriented albums in the late 1980s. Jura Stublić & Film's latest studio release, Hrana za golubove (Food for Pigeons), appeared in 1992, and in the following years Stublić would release new songs on compilation albums only. During recent years, Jura Stublić & Film, although officially still active, perform live occasionally only.

== Legacy ==
In 1998, Film album Novo! Novo! Novo! Još jučer samo na filmu a sada i u vašoj glavi was polled No. 22, Signali u noći (Signals in the Night) was polled No. 67, Sva čuda svijeta (All the Wonders of the World) was polled No. 69, and Film u Kulušiću – Live (Film in Kulušić - Live) was polled No. 70 on the list of 100 Greatest Albums of Yugoslav Popular Music in the book YU 100: najbolji albumi jugoslovenske rok i pop muzike (YU 100: The Best albums of Yugoslav pop and rock music). In 2015, Novo! Novo! Novo! Još jučer samo na filmu a sada i u vašoj glavi was polled No. 14 and Film u Kulušiću – Live was polled No. 45 on the list of 100 Greatest Yugoslav Albums published by the Croatian edition of Rolling Stone. In 1987, in YU legende uživo (YU Legends Live), a special publication by Rock magazine, Film u Kulušiću – Live was proclaimed one of 12 best Yugoslav live albums.

In 2000, Film songs "Mi nismo sami" and "Zajedno" were polled No. 36 and No. 81 respectively on the Rock Express Top 100 Yugoslav Rock Songs of All Times list. In 2006, three Film songs appeared on the B92 Top 100 Domestic Songs list: "Zamisli" was polled No. 27, "Neprilagođen" was polled No. 80, and "Boje su u nama" was polled No. 85.

The lyrics of 12 songs by the band, all authored by Stublić, were featured in Petar Janjatović's book Pesme bratstva, detinjstva & potomstva: Antologija ex YU rok poezije 1967 - 2007 (Songs of Brotherhood, Childhood & Offspring: Anthology of Ex YU Rock Poetry 1967 – 2007).

In 2022, Stublić was awarded the Porin Lifetime Achievement Award.

== Discography ==
=== With Film ===
==== Studio albums ====
- Novo! Novo! Novo! Još jučer samo na filmu a sada i u vašoj glavi (1981)
- Zona sumraka (1982)
- Sva čuda svijeta (1983)
- Signali u noći (1985)
- Sunce sja (1987)
- Zemlja sreće (1989)
- Hrana za golubove (1992)

==== Live albums ====
- Film u Kulušiću – Live (1981)

==== Compilation albums ====
- Greatest hits vol. 1 (1994)
- Greatest hits vol. 2 (1996)
- Sve najbolje (2001)

==== Singles ====
- "Kad si mlad" / "Zajedno" (1980)
- "Zamisli" / "Radio ljubav" (1981)
- "Zona sumraka" / "Espanja" (1982)
- "Pljačka stoljeća" / "Zagreb je hladan grad" (1982)
- "Ti zračiš zrake kroz zrak" / "Mi nismo sami" (1983)
- "Boje su u nama" / "Istina piše na zidu" (1983)
