= Žicanje =

Studio album by Jurica Pađen
- Released: 1 September 2005
- Recorded: 2005; SYAM Studio (Zagreb, Croatia)
- Genre: Rock
- Length: 35:16
- Label: Croatia Records
- Producer: Jurica Pađen, Remo Cartagine

Jurica Pađen chronology
Žicanje (2005)	All Stars (2014)

Singles from Žicanje
- 1. "Google Boogie" Released: September 2005

Žicanje is the first solo album by the Croatian guitarist Jurica Pađen, released through Croatia Records in September 2005. The album was recorded in early 2005 in SYAM Studio in Zagreb and contains 15 instrumental tracks featuring Remo Cartagine, Tomislav Šojat, Ana Šuto and Nikša Bratoš. The album release was followed by video for "Google Boogie", which was the only single from the album.

== Track listing ==
All music written by Jurica Pađen, all arrangements by Jurica Pađen and Remo Cartagine.

No.	Title	Length
1.	"Punk-Funk"	2:54
2.	"Nije štela doć u stan"	2:17
3.	"Put svile"	2:56
4.	"Plitko vrijeme"	2:47
5.	"Battery Low"	1:17
6.	"Žicanje"	2:00
7.	"California Ana"	3:28
8.	"Ašram"	1:11
9.	"Raštika Party"	1:50
10.	"Ocean Blues"	2:24
11.	"Tarina pjesma"	1:36
12.	"Google Boogie"	3:03
13.	"Napušteno selo"	2:19
14.	"Zračna gitara"	3:29
15.	"Dalmatia Intromental"	1:45
Total length:		35:16

== Personnel ==
Musicians

- Jurica Pađen – Guitars
- Remo Cartagine – Bass Guitar, Keyboards, Drum Programming
- Tomislav Šojat – Bass Guitar in tracks 4, 6, 9
- Ana Šuto – Keyboards
- Nikša Bratoš – Acoustic Guitar in track 13

Artwork

- Nika Pavlinek – Photography
- Antun Babogredac – Design

Production

- Jurica Pađen – Producer
- Remo Cartagine – Producer, Engineer
