= All Stars (Jurica Pađen album) =

Studio album by Jurica Pađen
- Released: 3 December 2014
- Recorded: July – October 2014; ZG Zvuk Studio (Zagreb, Croatia)
- Genre: Rock
- Length: 41:50
- Label: Croatia Records
- Producer: Jurica Pađen, Hrvoje Prskalo

Jurica Pađen chronology
Žicanje (2005)	All Stars (2014)

Singles from All Stars
- 1. "Love Is Blue / Al Dente" Released: November 2014; 2. "Prijateljska vatra" Released: June 2015

All Stars is the second solo album by the Croatian guitarist Jurica Pađen, released through Croatia Records in December 2014. The album was recorded from July to October 2014 in ZG Zvuk Studio in Zagreb and contains 12 instrumental tracks featuring some of the most famous guitar players from the Croatian rock scene like Massimo Savić, Branimir Štulić, Husein Hasanefendić, Zele Lipovača, Neno Belan, Vedran Božić and Nikša Bratoš. The album release was followed by video for "Love Is Blue / Al Dente", featuring Drugi Način guitarist Mario Domazet. The second single released was "Prijateljska vatra" in June 2015, featuring Branimir Štulić. The album debuted at #30 and topped at #10 on the official Croatian Top 40 domestic albums selling chart and at #11 on the combined domestic/foreign chart. The album was nominated in two categories on 22nd Porin Music Award in 2015 and was awarded for "Instrumental Album of the Year (outside Classical and Jazz music)".

== Track listing ==
All music written by Jurica Pađen, except track 11 by André Popp.

No.	Title	Length
1.	"Gipsy Love" (featuring Massimo Savić)	4:35
2.	"Prijateljska vatra" (featuring Branimir Štulić)	3:58
3.	"Mistično putovanje vodenjaka" (featuring Husein Hasanefendić)	3:39
4.	"Hells Bells" (featuring Zele Lipovača)	3:44
5.	"Kralj u zemlji tulipana" (featuring Massimo Savić and Neno Belan)	6:06
6.	"Van zakona" (featuring Vedran Božić)	3:53
7.	"Mjesečar" (featuring Nikša Bratoš)	3:09
8.	"Rasplesani lampion"	2:51
9.	"No Profit"	3:11
10.	"Ponoćna potjera"	3:36
11.	"Love Is Blue"	1:25
12.	"Al Dente"	1:43
Total length:		41:50

== Charts ==
Year	Chart	Peak position
2014	Croatian Albums Chart	10

== Personnel ==
Organic band

- Jurica Pađen – Electric guitars, Acoustic guitars, twelve-string guitars, ukulele
- Tomislav Šojat – Bass in tracks 1, 2, 4, 5 and 9
- Damir Medić – Drums, cajon, percussions
- Remo Cartagine – Bass in tracks 3, 7, 8 and 10
- Mario Domazet – Charango, acoustic guitars, resonator guitars
- Hrvoje Prskalo – Acoustic guitars, percussions

Guest musicians

- Branimir Štulić – Electric guitars in track 2
- Husein Hasanefendić – Electric guitars in track 3
- Massimo Savić – Electric guitars in tracks 1 and 5
- Neno Belan – Electric guitars in track 5
- Nikša Bratoš – Electric guitars, acoustic guitars in track 7
- Vedran Božić – Electric guitars and bass in track 6
- Zele Lipovača – Electric guitars in track 4

Artwork

- Ljubo Zdjelarević – Photography and design

Production

- Jurica Pađen – Producer
- Hrvoje Prskalo – Producer, Audio engineer
