= Tatjana Olujić =

Serbian violinist and university professor

Tatjana Olujić (Serbian: Татјана Олујић) is a Serbian violinist and university professor. She is a professor at Faculty of Music Art in Belgrade having studied violin with the Professor Andre Gertler and the chamber music with the Maestro Van Den Doorn in Belgium.

== Education and background ==
Graduated from the Faculty of Music in the class of prof. Aleksandar Pavlović. She specialized violin in the class of prof. A. Gertler and chamber music in the class of prof. V. Den Doorn in Belgium and a master's degree in the class of Prof. G. Octors at the Royal Conservatory in Brussels. She also trained at Menuhin's International Academy. She is the winner of many international awards and recognitions, of which the First Special Prize for Violin awarded by the Royal Conservatory in Brussels, the First Special Prize for Chamber Music with the Japanese pianist Umene Megumi should be highlighted. He is a participant in numerous international seminars and a multi-year recipient of diplomas: "Bela Bartok" in Budapest, "Franz Liszt" in Weimar, International Schools in Goslar (Germany), Estoril (Portugal) etc. She spent three years as a violin professor at the Royal Academy of Music in Brussels, and then she became a member of the chamber solo group in Switzerland, "Camerata Lysy Gstaad", which worked under the auspices of Yahudi Menuhin. As a soloist, she performed throughout the old and new Yugoslavia, Belgium, the Netherlands, Denmark, Hungary, Russia, Romania, Germany, Switzerland, Spain, Portugal, France, Italy, Cyprus, Bulgaria, the USA (Carnegie Hall, Dag Hammarskjold - United Nations Hall - New York), Taiwan, in the countries of Central and Latin America and Africa, she recorded for the radio and television centers of those countries. She has recorded five LP records, two cassettes and three compact discs. For two years she was the concertmaster of the symphony orchestra and a professor conservatory in the Dominican Republic, where she also had a private violin school. For four years, she led the chamber orchestra "Kamerata Belgrade", whose members were mainly students of the Faculty of Music. In addition to his many years of continuous teaching experience at high music institutions, she has held summer and winter schools and international violin seminars for years in Honduras (San Pedro Sula), Vrnjačka Banja - Castle of Culture, Žabljak, Belgrade, Prohor Pčinjski Monastery, etc. Since September 1995. held the "Violin Music Workshop" in Đura Jakšić's house in Belgrade, where she worked until July 1997, and from September 1997 to 2000, the music workshop continued with by working in the Roman Hall of the City Library. She was engaged as a professor at the Private Academy of Fine Arts - ALU. On May 6, 2018, she was accepted as a corresponding member of the Serbian Development Academy, and from January 27, 2019, she became a regular academician. May 15, 2018 she was presented with a Golden Badge at the National Theatre awarded by the Cultural and Educational Community of Serbia, for selfless, dedicated and long-term work and creative contribution to the spread of culture. In June 2022, she was awarded the "Golden Beočug" award, which is awarded by the Cultural and Educational Community of Belgrade for permanent contribution to the culture of the capital, as part of a solemn ceremony on the Grand Stage of the National Theater in Belgrade.
