= Azra (band) =

Yugoslav rock band

- Azra promotional photo. Left to right: Hrnjak, Štulić, Leiner.

Background information
- Origin: Zagreb, SR Croatia, SFR Yugoslavia
- Genres: New wave, rock
- Years active: 1977–1984, 1986–1988 (Note: Indefinite hiatus)
- Labels: Jugoton, Diskoton
- Spinoffs: Film
- Past members: Branimir Štulić; Boris Leiner; Jura Stublić; Jurica Pađen; Mišo Hrnjak; Paolo Sfeci; Stephen Kipp

Azra was a Yugoslav rock band that was one of the most popular acts of the Yugoslav new wave music of the 1980s. Azra was formed in 1977 by its frontman Branimir "Johnny" Štulić. The other two members of the original line-up were Mišo Hrnjak (bass) and Boris Leiner (drums). The band is named after a verse from Der Asra by Heinrich Heine. They are considered to be one of the most influential bands from the Yugoslav new wave rock era and the Yugoslav rock scene in general.

They released their first single, "Balkan" and "A šta da radim", in 1979. Their eponymous debut was released in 1980 and achieved commercial success, giving them commercial success in Yugoslavia. Their second album was released in 1981. Azra recorded its last studio album Između krajnosti (Between the Extremes) in 1987. After their 4LP live album under the name Zadovoljština (Satisfaction) was released in 1988, the band went on an indefinite hiatus, allowing all members to pursue solo projects. Štulić recorded three more solo albums since moving to the Netherlands, where he lives in seclusion. A 2003 rock documentary, Sretno dijete depicts Azra as the focus of the rock scene in Yugoslavia during the 1980s, along with Bijelo dugme. Even today, Azra remains very popular among youth in the countries of the former Yugoslavia.

In 1986, the band released their sixth album, It Ain't Like In The Movies At All through Diskoton. The triple album was recorded in the Netherlands, after Branimir Štulić had moved to that country.

In 1998, music critics compiled a list of the 100 best albums of Yugoslav pop and rock music. Five Azra albums were included, three of them in top 10. On the Radio B92's list of 100 greatest songs of former Yugoslavia, four Azra songs were included, all of them in the top 20.

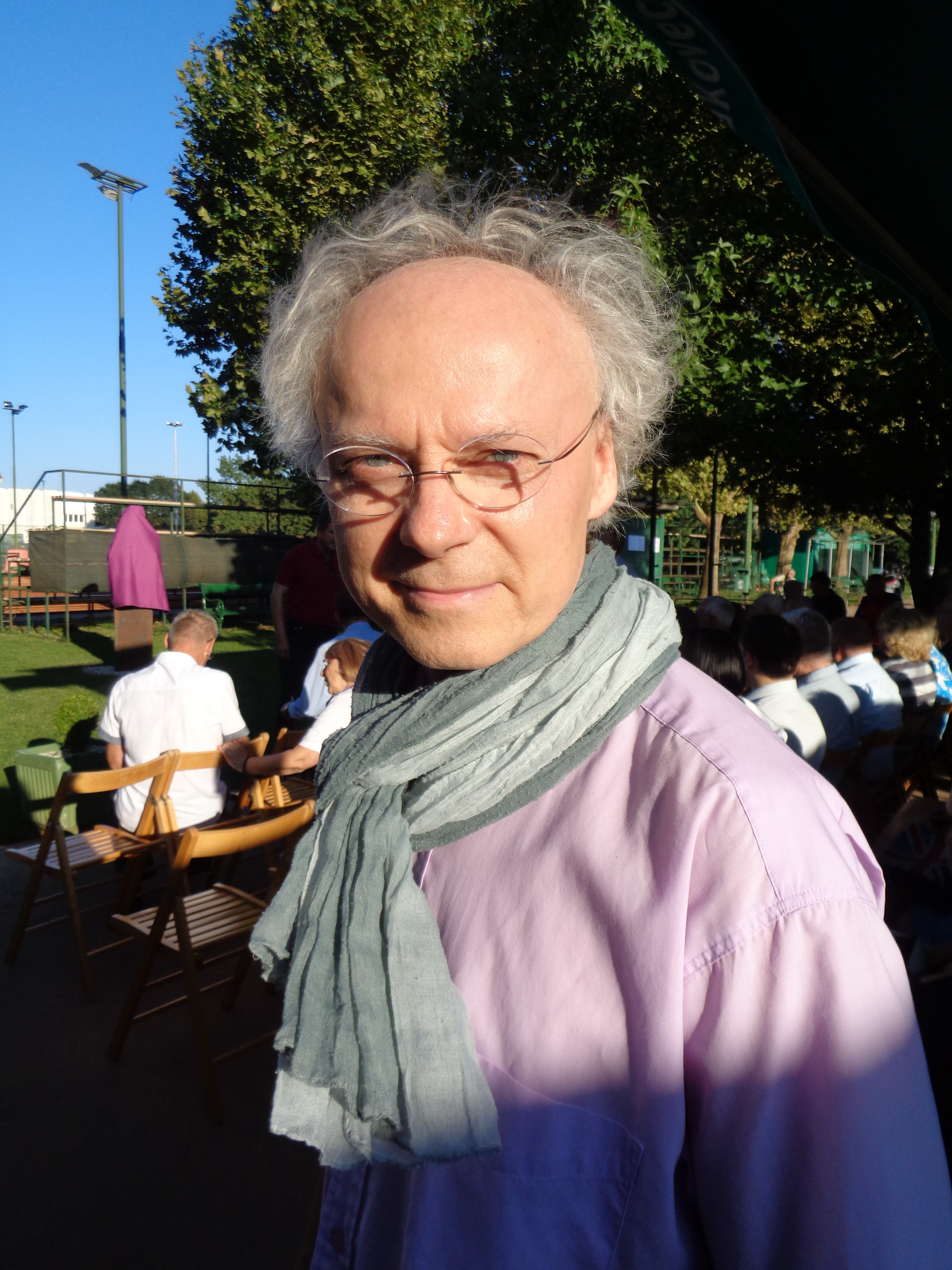
Boris Leiner, former drummer (October 2016)

== Members ==
- Branimir "Johnny" Štulić – vocals, guitar (1977–1978, 1979–1984, 1986–1988)
- Branko Matun – bass (1977)
- Paolo Sfeci – drums (1977)
- Mladen Jurčić – guitar (1977–1978)
- Branko Hromatko – drums (1977–1978)
- Marino Pelajić – bass (1977–1978)
- Jura Stublić – vocals (1978)
- Boris Leiner (ex Kanibali) – drums, vocals (1979–1982, 1983–1984, 1986–1988)
- Mišo Hrnjak – bass (1979–1982)
- Jurica Pađen – guitars (1983–1984, 1987–1988)
- Stephen Kipp – bass (1986–1988)

== Discography ==
=== Studio albums ===
- Azra (Jugoton, 1980)
- Sunčana strana ulice (Jugoton, 1981)
- Filigranski pločnici (Jugoton, 1982)
- Kad fazani lete (Jugoton, 1983)
- Krivo srastanje (Jugoton, 1984)
- It Ain't Like in the Movies at All (Diskoton, 1986)
- Između krajnosti (Jugoton, 1987)

=== Live albums ===
- Ravno do dna (Jugoton, 1982)
- Zadovoljština (Jugoton, 1988)

=== Compilation albums ===
- Singl ploče 1979–1982 (Jugoton, 1982)
- Kao i jučer – singl ploče 1983–1986 (Jugoton, 1986)
- Nikom nije lepše (Hi-Fi Centar, 1998)
- The Ultimate Collection (Croatia Records, 2007)

=== Singles ===
- "Balkan" / "A šta da radim" (Suzy, 1979)
- "Lijepe žene prolaze kroz grad", "Poziv na ples" / "Suzy F." (Jugoton, 1980)
- "Đoni, budi dobar" / "Teško vrijeme" (Jugoton, 1982)
- "E, pa što" / "Sloboda" / "Gluperde lutaju daleko" (Jugoton, 1982)
- "Nemir i strast" / "Doviđenja na Vlaškom drumu" (Jugoton, 1983)
- "Klinček stoji pod oblokom" / "Flash" (Jugoton, 1983)
- "Mon ami" / "Duboko u tebi" (Jugoton, 1984)
- "The Balkans" / "Pretty Women Passing Through Town" / "Vondel Park" (Marginal Face Production, 1985)

== Videography ==
- Zadovoljština (Zagreb, live concert, 1988)
- Klincek stoji pod oblokom (Video compilation, 1990)
- Das Ist Johnny (Sarajevo, live film, 1991)
