= Rajko Dujmić =

Croatian songwriter (1954–2020)

- Born: 7 August 1954; Zagreb, PR Croatia, Yugoslavia
- Died: 4 August 2020 (aged 65); Sušak, Croatia
- Occupations: Songwriter; composer; music producer
- Years active: 1974–2020
- Spouse: Snježana Dujmić (m. 1990)
- Children: 1
- Musical career
- Genre: Pop
- Instruments: Vocals; guitar; piano; violin
- Labels: Jugoton; Croatia Records
- Formerly of: Novi fosili

Rajko Dujmić (7 August 1954 – 4 August 2020) was a Croatian songwriter, composer and music producer best known as a member of the pop group Novi fosili.

He composed the winner entry of Eurovision Song Contest 1989, "Rock me", along with Stevo Cvikić. They also composed the two previous Yugoslav entries, "Ja sam za ples", sung by Novi fosili, and "Mangup", sung by Srebrna Krila.

He received the Porin award for lifetime achievement at the Croatian music awards in 2013.

== Personal life ==
Dujmić was of paternal Croat and maternal Austrian descent. He married his wife Snježana on 2 December 1990. He had a son Tin from a previous relationship with a Novi fosili backing vocalist Vesna Srećković.

After involvement in a traffic accident in the village of Stari Laz, Primorje-Gorski Kotar County, on 29 July 2020, Dujmić died six days later, on 4 August, at the Rijeka Clinical Hospital Center. He was 65.
