= Branimir Štulić =

Yugoslav singer-songwriter and author

- Also known as: Johnny Štulić
- Born: 11 April 1953 (age 73); Skopje, PR Macedonia, Yugoslavia
- Genres: Rock
- Instruments: Vocals; guitar; bass guitar; acoustic guitar
- Years active: 1977–present
- Labels: Azra Music; Jugoton
- Formerly of: Azra

Branimir "Johnny" Štulić (born April 11, 1953) is a Yugoslav singer-songwriter, musician and author, best known for being the frontman of the popular Yugoslav rock group Azra. He is known for his charismatic stage performances and inspiring song lyrics that often combined rock poetry with a strong sense for social commentary, which is the cause for him becoming a cult figure.

== Early life ==
Štulić was born on April 11, 1953, in Skopje, where his mother Slavica (née Milovac) and father Ivan Štulić–an officer in the Yugoslav People's Army–were stationed at the time. His paternal Croatian family originates from Nin, belonging to one of the town's oldest families. His family background is ethnic Croat but he declares himself a "Balkanian". At the age of seven, Štulić moved with his family to Jastrebarsko. In January 1967, Štulić moved to Zagreb, where he attended high school and later studied phonetics and history at the University of Zagreb's Faculty of Philosophy for two years before dropping out.

== Music career ==
He began his musical career with a band named "Balkan Sevdah band", performing his own songs, as well as covers of The Beatles and folk music. The name of the band was changed to Azra in 1977. The initial line up, which included Jura Stublić, Marino Pelajić and Mladen Juričić, soon dissolved, and the other members formed another popular band, Film. During the 1980s, Azra became one of the most prominent and influential musical acts in Yugoslavia. The time spent in Azra brought Štulić widespread fame in Yugoslavia, as well as a rabid and devoted youth following – Štulić often used his music as commentary directed towards the social and political conditions in Socialist Yugoslavia.

He has been living in the Netherlands since 1986. From 1989, he performed under his name with live support of "Sevdah Shuttle Band", and released the solo studio albums Balkanska rapsodija (1989) and Balegari ne vjeruju sreći (1990). When it became obvious to him that Yugoslavia would collapse, in 1991 Štulić recorded the album Sevdah za Paulu Horvat (released in 1995) and the documentary Das ist Johnny, which featured a view from the window of Johnny's Sarajevo hotel room, with him concluding that "soon all would burn." His alleged last visit to the territory was in 1995 in Belgrade, where he produced the album Anali and promoted the book Božanska Ilijada.

In the wake of the Yugoslav Wars, Štulić frequently expressed his disapproval of separatism and was a fervent believer of Yugoslavism and "brotherhood and unity". He commented: "I have no passport, no money and no place to go back to. I had a Yugoslav one and it expired. Yugoslavia is no more, it's the same as when you are born and you are told: this is your father, this is your mother, because, according to Homer, no one knows, when they are born, who gave birth to them, at least for the first three years. And now I do not have my parents and that's why I'm happy". After most Yugoslav Wars ended in 1995, Štulić recorded two solo albums, both released in Belgrade, Serbia, FR Yugoslavia, with the last, Blase, in 1997.

== Life in the Netherlands ==
In 2005 he published an autobiography called Smijurija u mjerama, with mixed to positive reception. Hrvoje Horvat, a Croatian journalist, wrote a biography of Johnny Štulić titled Fantom slobode ("The Phantom of Freedom"), published in 2006. Due to Štulić's immense popularity in former Yugoslavia, the book was an immediate commercial success. However, it was also heavily criticized by many literary critics, and even Štulić himself, for its occasionally poor writing quality and alleged misinterpretation of facts. Ines Pletikos directed a documentary film Kad Miki kaže da se boji (2004), and Kruno Petrinović wrote a book, Prilozi za biografiju Johnnyja B. Štulića (2006), about the heroes of Johnny's poems.

Today, Štulić lives a modest and ascetic lifestyle in Houten, Netherlands, with wife Josephine Grundmeiyer. He typically does not give interviews and is very protective of his privacy. He states he has no interest in going back to his rock career, though he has since recorded and posted over 600 traditional songs, hit covers and some original material on YouTube. He also worked on a dozen Serbo-Croatian translations of ancient and medieval works.

In 2012 he initiated a lawsuit against Croatia Records from Zagreb, the direct successor of Jugoton, over royalty rights, as well book publisher from Belgrade, for copyright infringement. In revolt to the statements made by music editor from the Croatia Records and former Jugoton, Štulić stated that Azra is not a Croatian band. About appearing in Croatia or Serbia, he said that he does not want to perform in "occupied territories", referring to the successor states that contributed to the breakup of Yugoslavia. He saw himself as Yugoslav and stated that Yugoslavia is his only country of origin. Štulić states he sees no reason to return to the region, as he "went as far away as possible from people who suddenly wanted to kill each other". Upon being asked about visiting Croatia or Serbia, he stated he could not due to not possessing a passport and that he has no interest in registering for one.

== Discography ==
- Balkanska rapsodija (1989, Jugoton)
- Balegari ne vjeruju sreći (1990, Jugoton)
- Sevdah za Paulu Horvat (1991, Komuna)
- Anali (1995, Komuna)
- Blase (1997, Hi-Fi Centar)
- splet (2021, self-released)
- kavern (2022, self-released)
