= Patrola =

Yugoslav rock band

- Patrola in 1981

Background information
- Origin: Zagreb, SR Croatia, SFR Yugoslavia
- Genres: New wave; power pop
- Years active: 1980–1983
- Label: Suzy
- Past members: Renato Metessi; Aleksandar Mićunović; Damir Molnar; Staško Adlešić; Dragan Simonovski; Mladen Bodalec; Zorislav Preskavec; Goran Markić

Patrola (transl. Patrol) was a Yugoslav new wave band formed in Zagreb in 1980. Although short-lived, releasing only one studio album during its run, Patrola was a prominent act of the Yugoslav new wave scene.

== History ==
Patrola was formed in 1980 by Renato Metessi (vocals), Aleksandar Mićunović "Amigo" (guitar), Damir Molnar (guitar), Staško Adlešić (bass guitar) and Dragan Simonovski (drums). At the end of 1980, the band presented themselves to wider audience, performing in Zagreb club Lapidarij on the prominent YU Rock Momenat (YU Rock Moment) festival, alongside Lačni Franz, Električni Orgazam, Buldogi, Šarlo Akrobata, Pekinška Patka, Film, Haustor and other young new wave acts. In January 1981, the band performed, alongside other Zagreb-based new wave acts, on a four-day festival Pozdrav iz Zagreba (Greetings from Zagreb) held in Belgrade Youth Center.

In 1981, the group released their debut studio album U sredini (In the Middle) through Suzy record label. The album was produced by Parni Valjak guitarist and leader Husein Hasanefendić "Hus" and featured guest appearance by Parni Valjak guitarist Rastko Milošev. Featuring new wave and power pop sound with occasional elements of ska, the album brought summer hits "Ne pitaj za mene" ("Don't Ask about Me"), "U sredini" and "Čovjek bez slobode" ("Man without Freedom"). During the promotional tour, on a concert held in Zagreb's Lapidarij, Metessi and Mićunović got into a physical fight, Metessi leaving the stage in the middle of Patrola's performance. The incident led to departure of Metessi, who would soon after form successful band Zvijezde.

After Metessi's departure, the first lineup of the band split up. Molnar reformed the group, the new lineup featuring, alongsgide himself, vocalist Mladen Bodalec, bass guitarist Zorislav Preskavec and drummer Goran Markić. The new lineup recorded the band's second album entitled Tragovi noći (Traces of the Night). However, after the album recording, Molnar had to leave the group due to his mandatory stint in the Yugoslav army, Patrola thus ending its activity, Tragovi noći ending up unreleased.

=== Post breakup ===
After the first lineup of Patrola disbanded, Mićunović and Simonovski formed the band Tora with bass guitarist Mladen Megyery and keyboardist Darko Anić. The band released only one, self-titled album in 1983 before disbanding. After Tora split up, Simonovski moved to Dorian Gray. Bodalec appeared as backing vocalist on the 1983 album Korak od sna (One Step from the Dream) by Prljavo Kazalište, in 1985 becoming the band's vocalist, replacing their original frontman Davorin Bogović. In late 1980s, Preskavec became bass guitarist for Parni Valjak.

== Legacy ==
The song "Ne pitaj za mene" was covered in 1993 by Croatian pop singer Ivana Banfić, her version released as single, and in 2008 by Serbian punk rock band Novembar, their version released on their album Radulizam.

== Discography ==
=== Studio albums ===
- U sredini (1981)
