= Marijan Brkić Brk =

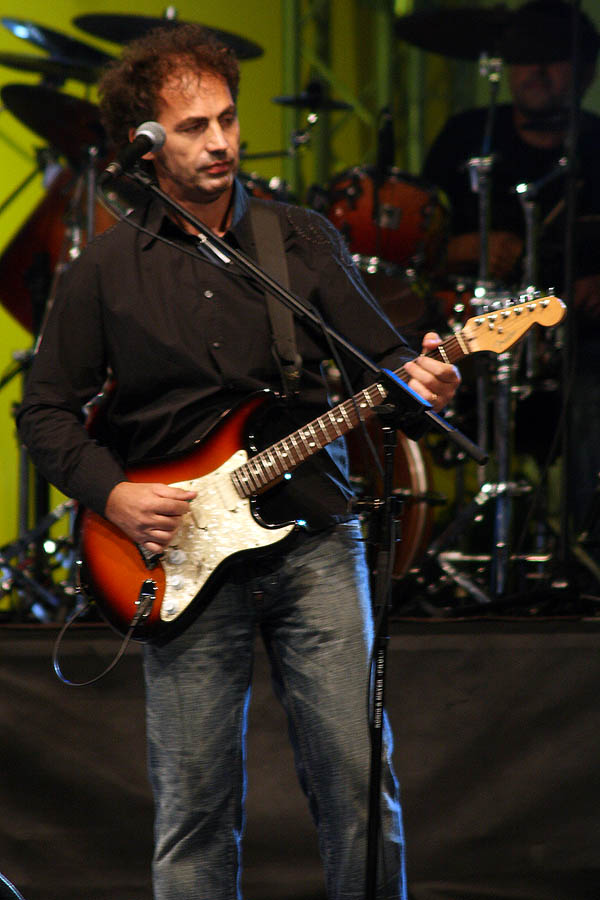
- Brkić performing live in 2007

Background information
- Also known as: Brk
- Born: Marijan Brkić; 20 January 1962 (age 63); Zagreb, PR Croatia, FPR Yugoslavia
- Genres: Punk rock; new wave; rock; pop rock; power pop
- Occupation: Guitarist
- Years active: 1979–present
- Formerly of: Prljavo Kazalište
- Website: www.brk.hr

Marijan Brkić "Brk" (born 20 January 1962) is a Croatian and Yugoslav musician, songwriter, music arranger and producer, best known as guitarist for highly popular rock bands Prljavo Kazalište and Parni Valjak. Brkić has also worked with singer-songwriter Zlatan Stipišić Gibonni, released one solo album and one album recorded with keyboardist Berislav Blažević, and worked as producer with a number of prominent artists.

== Musical career ==
=== Prljavo Kazalište (1979–1989) ===
Brkić started his career at the age of 17, as a member of the punk rock band Prljavo Kazalište. Brkić joined the band during the recording sessions for their debut studio album, replacing guitarist Zoran Cvetković. Brkić remained with Prljavo Kazalište throughout the 1980s and their shift from new wave sound to radio-friendly pop rock, recording five more studio albums with the group and departing from the band in 1989.

=== Parni Valjak (1990–2005, 2009–present) ===
Brkić joined popular band Parni Valjak in 1990. He remained with Parni Valjak until the band's 2005 farewell tour, recording four studio albums and two live albums with them. In 2009, he rejoined Parni Valjak on their reunion tour and has been playing with the band since, recording two more studio albums with the group.

=== Gibonni's backing band (2006–2009) ===
Following the disbandment of Parni Valjak in 2005, Brkić joined the backing band of popular singer-songwriter Zlatan Stipišić "Gibonni", partaking in the recording of his 2007 live album Acoustic:Electric.

=== Solo works ===
In 2005, in collaboration with Parni Valjak keyboardist Berislav Blažević, Brkić recorded an album of Christmas songs entitled Božićni san (Christmas Dream). In 2007, Brkić released the album entitled Bolji svijet (A Better World). The album featured a number of prominent guest vocalists: Dado Topić, Aki Rahimovski, Oliver Dragojević, Massimo Savić, Zlatan Stipišić "Gibonni", Toni Cetinski, Tina Rupčić and others.

=== Other activities ===
In addition to producing albums by Prljavo Kazalište, Parni Valjak and Gibonni, Brkić has worked as producer with a number of acts, including Zvijezde, Regata, Boris Novković and others. He has made guest appearances on albums by Plavi Orkestar, Regata, Drugi Način, Davorin Bogović, Plava Trava Zaborava, Film and other artists.

Brkić runs his own recording studio MB in Zagreb, where Parni Valjak has recorded some of their albums.

== Discography ==
=== With Prljavo Kazalište ===
==== Studio albums ====
- Prljavo Kazalište (1979)
- Crno bijeli svijet (1980)
- Heroj ulice (1981)
- Korak od sna (1983)
- Zlatne godine (1985)
- Zaustavite zemlju (1988)

=== With Parni Valjak ===
==== Studio albums ====
- Buđenje (1993)
- Samo snovi teku uzvodno (1997)
- Zastave (2000)
- Pretežno sunčano? (2004)
- Stvarno nestvarno (2011)
- Nema predaje
- Vrijeme (2018)

==== Live albums ====
- Bez struje – Live in ZeKaeM (1995)
- Kao nekada / Live at S.C. (2001)
- Dovoljno je reći... Aki (2022)

=== With Gibonni ===
==== Live albums ====
- Acoustic:Electric (2007)

=== Solo ===
==== Studio albums ====
- Božićni san (2005, with Berislav Blažević)
- Bolji svijet (2007)

==== Singles ====
- "Bolji svijet" (2007)

=== As producer ===
==== Studio albums ====
- Prljavo Kazalište – Zaustavite Zemlju (1988)
- Zvijezde – Licem prema nebu (1990)
- Regata – Obuzdaj nagone! (1990)
- Leteći Odred – Među zvijezdama (1992)
- Boris Novković – Struji struja (1994)
- Frama – Sa Svetim Franjom zajedno (1996)
- Davorin i Bogovići – Sretno dijete (1998)
- Electro Spiritus – Očev dom (2000)
- Marijan Brkić i Berislav Blažević – Božićni san (2005)
- Marijan Brkić – Bolji svijet (2007)
- Parni Valjak – Stvarno nestvarno (2011)

==== Live albums ====
- Parni Valjak – Kao nekada / Live at S.C. (2001)
- Gibonni – Acoustic:Electric (2007)
- Parni Valjak – Live in Pula (2017)
- Parni Valjak – Dovoljno je reći... Aki (2022)
