= Prljavo Kazalište =

Croatian rock bands

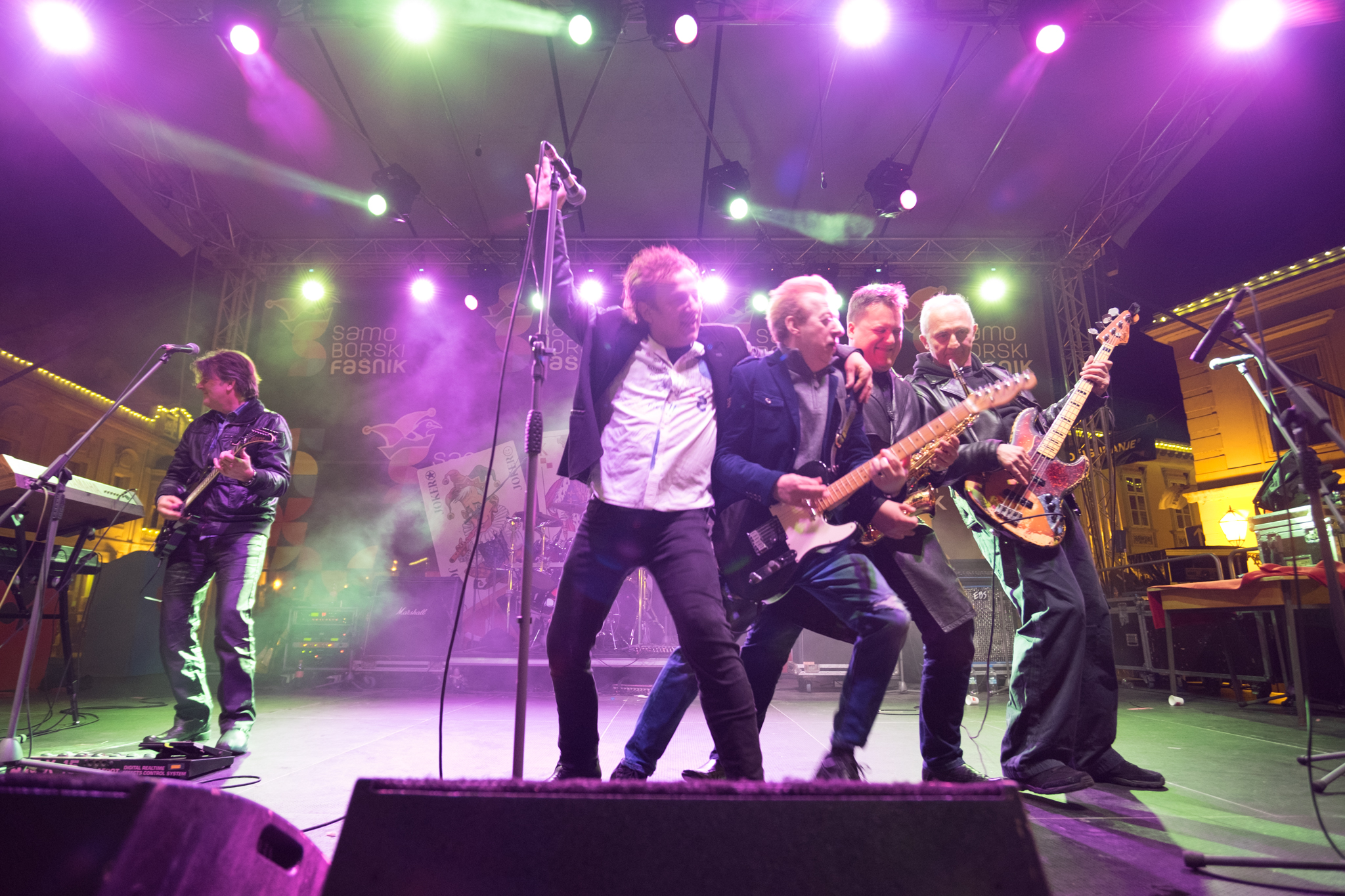
- Prljavo Kazalište performing in 2017

Background information
- Origin: Zagreb, Croatia
- Genres: Punk rock (early); new wave; rock; power pop; pop rock
- Years active: 1977–present
- Labels: Jugoton, Suzy, Crno Bijeli Svijet Records, InterService, Croatia Records, Dallas Records, Hit Records
- Members: Jasenko Houra; Mladen Bodalec; Damir Lipošek; Fedor Boić; Marko Karačić; Marko Lazarić
- Past members: Davorin Bogović; Zoran Cvetković; Nino Hrastek; Tihomir Fileš; Marijan Brkić; Dražen Šolc; Mladen Roško; Zlatko Bebek; Jurica Leikauff; Dubravko Vorih; Mario Zidar

Prljavo Kazalište (lit. Dirty Theater) is the name of two Croatian (formerly Yugoslav) rock bands; one formed in Zagreb in 1977, and the other formed in Zagreb in 2023. Initially part of the Yugoslav punk rock and new wave scene, the original incarnation of the band turned to mainstream rock sound in mid-1980s. The group has enjoyed large popularity throughout most of its career, and is widely considered one of the most influential acts of Yugoslav and Croatian rock scenes.

Formed by vocalist Davorin Bogović, guitarist Jasenko Houra, guitarist Zoran Cvetković "Zok", bass guitarist Nino Hrastek and drummer Tihomir Fileš, Prljavo Kazalište initially performed punk rock, their songs lyrics featuring provocative social commentary. Their eponymous debut album, recorded with guitarist Marijan Brkić "Brk", who came in as replacement for Cvetković, was released in 1979 to large attention of the country's public and critical acclaim. With their following, more ska- and 2 Tone-oriented album Crno bijeli svijet the group established themselves as one of the most notable acts of the Yugoslav new wave scene. After the album release, Bogović departed from the group, and the band recorded their third album Heroj ulice with Houra on lead vocals, the record marking the band's shift towards more conventional rock sound. Bogović returned for the group's fourth album Korak od sna, after which the group went on hiatus. The band returned to the scene with the 1985 album Zlatne godine, featuring new frontman Mladen Bodalec and radio-friendly pop rock sound. During the following years, the band would enjoy large mainstream popularity, scoring a number of hit songs. Their late 1980s work sparked controversy in some parts of Yugoslavia due to its (perceived) nationalistic undertones, but also increased the band's popularity in Croatian public. During the Croatian War of Independence, the band recorded a number of patriotic tunes, but returned to social criticism with their late 1990s works. The group maintained their musical direction with mainstream rock sound, returning briefly to their new wave roots with the 2003 album Radio Dubrava. Since the late 1990s, Prljavo Kazalište has enjoyed the status of the most popular Croatian rock band (alongside Parni Valjak), also maintaining large popularity in other former Yugoslav republics.

In 2022, a fallout between two remaining original members, Jasenko Houra and Tihomir Fileš, led to a legal process over the rights to the band name. Since 2023, two factions of the band have been active, both named Prljavo Kazalište, one led by Houra and fronted by Bodalec, and the other led by Fileš and fronted by original vocalist Davorin Bogović.

== Biography ==
=== 1977–1979: Formation, debut album and instant popularity ===
The band's origins can be tracked to the band Ciferšlus (Zipper), active in Zagreb in the second half of 1970s and consisting of vocalist Davorin Bogović, guitarist Zoran Cvetković "Zok", bass guitarist Nino Hrastek and drummer Tihomir Fileš. In 1977, the four were joined by guitarist Jasenko Houra, the five deciding to start working under a new name. Cvetković, Hrastek, Fileš and Houra briefly considered to replace Bogović with Davor Gobac (at the time member of the band Klinska Pomora, later of Psihomodo Pop fame), but eventually Bogović remained the group's frontman. The band was officially formed in Dubrava, an urban area of Zagreb, on 29 November, celebrated in Yugoslavia as the Republic Day. Initially, the members considered the name Zarazne Bolesti (Contagious Diseases), but eventually opted for Prljavo Kazalište, after a fictional theatre appearing in the episode "Trio Fnatastikus" of the Italian satirical comic book Alan Ford, which enjoyed large popularity in Yugoslavia.

Initially, the band experimented with different styles, with the song "Moj otac je bio u ratu" ("My Father Fought in the War") being the first one they wrote. The band's first notable performance was in 1978, at a concert organized by the youth magazine Polet, where they were noted for their punk image and stage performance. During the same year, they released their first 7-inch single, featuring provocative songs "Televizori" ("TV Sets"), "Majka" ("Mother") and "Moje djetinjstvo" ("My Childhood"), for the major record label Jugoton. The single was produced by Vedran Božić, music producer and former guitarist for progressive rock bands Dinamiti and Time. The record was followed by the 7-inch single with the songs "Moj otac je bio u ratu" and "Noć" ("Night"), the latter featuring Houra on lead vocals, released in 1979 through Suzy Records. The singles brought them attention of the Yugoslav public and music press, and "Moj otac je bio u ratu" even saw a positive review in British music magazine New Musical Express.

In 1979, Prljavo Kazalište released their eponymous debut album, produced by Ivan "Piko" Stančić, for Suzy Records. During the recording sessions, Zoran Cvetković left the band, and was replaced by guitarist Marijan Brkić "Brk". Songs lyrics, written by Houra, dealt with traumas of young age, capturing the experiences of Yugoslav urban youth with direct social commentary in the songs "Sretno dijete" ("Happy Child"), "Ja sam mladić u najboljim godinama" ("I'm a Young Man in My Prime") and "Subotom uveče" ("On Saturday Evenings"). State censorship commission labeled the album as "šund" ("kitsch"), hence imposing higher taxes on its sale price (while the records considered "artistic" enjoyed a reduced tax rate); the label was most likely imposed owing to the song "Neki dječaci (Some Boys)", arguably the first gay-themed song in Yugoslav popular music. The record sleeve was designed by Yugoslav artist Mirko Ilić and featured a parody of the John Pasche's famous Hot Lips logo, with sliced tongue and upper lip pierced with a safety pin, representing the band's equal respect for both punk rock scene and older rock acts like The Rolling Stones. Mirko Ilić also wrote the lyrics for the album song "Čovjek za sutra" ("Tomorrow's Man"), although he was not credited on the cover. Prljavo Kazalište and their debut gained new attention of the public after the group appeared at a concert at the JNA Stadium in Belgrade, where they performed as one of the support acts for the most popular Yugoslav band of the time, Bijelo Dugme. Although Prljavo Kazalište played on their debut album in a rudimentary manner, the Yugoslav public and music press soon proclaimed it one of the best debut albums of the Yugoslav rock music, and the readers of the music magazine Džuboks polled the group at the end of 1979 as the Biggest Young Hopes of the Scene.

=== 1980–1981: Switch to new wave, Bogović's departure ===
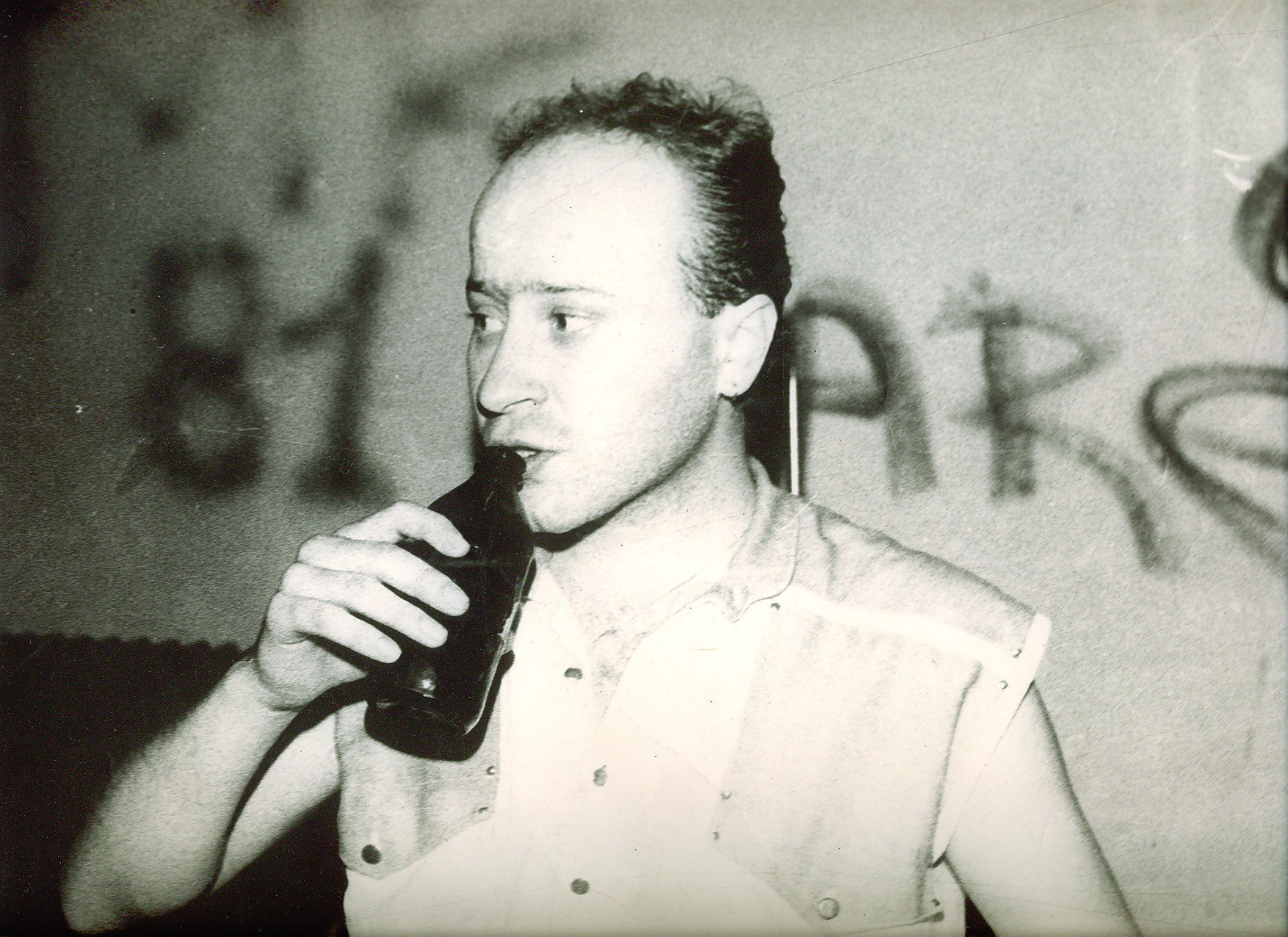
Davorin Bogović in 1981

On their second album, titled Crno bijeli svijet (Black and White World) and released in 1980, Prljavo Kazalište affiliated with new wave, accepting a more polished image and sound. The album, once again produced by Piko Stančić and released for Suzy, was recorded in Milan, Italy. It included ska- and 2 Tone-influenced songs, with guitar sound influenced by the 1960s bands The Shadows and Crveni Koralji and lyrics inspired by Zagreb city life. Demonstrating better musicianship than on their debut, the band scored the hits "Mi plešemo" ("We Dance")—the original title was supposed to be "Mi pijemo" ("We Drink")—"Neki moji prijatelji" ("Some of My Friends"), "Nove cipele" ("New Shoes"), the title track and a cover of "Sedamnaest ti je godina tek" ("You're Only Seventeen") by traditional pop singer Ivo Robić. The album was a commercial success, selling more than 110,000 copies. On the promotional concert in Zagreb's Dom sportova, held on 27 December 1980, the band was joined on stage by traditional tamburica orchestra Zagrebački Muzikaši, in the song "Mi plešemo", the guest appearance revealing Houra's interest for Croatian traditional music. In January 1981, the band played a triumphant concert in Belgrade Youth Center, held as a part of Pozdrav iz Zagreba (Greetings from Zagreb) festival and featuring Haustor as the opening act.

Prljavo Kazalište started to prepare their third studio album, but the beginning of the recording sessions was postponed several times. Frustrated, Bogović took a vacation, travelling to Yugoslav seaside. When the recording sessions were finally scheduled, the rest of the members did not manage to contact him. Angry at Bogović due to his irresponsibility, they decided to exclude him from the band.

=== 1982–1984: Shift to mainstream: Houra fronting, Bogović's return and hiatus ===
For the recording of Prljavo Kazalište third album, Houra took over the vocal duties. The album, entitled Heroj ulice (Hero of the Street), was recorded in Sweden and produced by Tini Varga. It featured guest appearances by percussionists Sjunne Ferger and Miroslav Budanko and saxophonist Janne Gustafsson. Although maintaining a connection with their earlier works through the song "Amerika" ("America"), the band generally moved to a more conventional rock sound with the songs like "Djevojke bi" ("The Girls Would"), "Sve gradske bitange" ("All the City's Punks") and "Lupam glavom u radio" ("I'm Banging My Head Against the Radio"). On the album cover, the songs "Heroj ulice" and "Široke ulice" ("Wide Streets") were labeled as tribute to Bruce Springsteen, and the ballad "Noćas sam izašao na kišu" ("Tonight I Walked Out Into the Rain") as a tribute to Phil Collins. After the release of the record, Fileš and Hrastek went to serve their mandatory stints in the Yugoslav People's Army, so the group continued to perform with the help of the drummer Dražen Šolc and former member Zoran Cvetković, who played bass guitar in this lineup.

In 1983, Davorin Bogović returned to the band, and sang on their fourth album Korak od sna (One Step from the Dream). Collaborating with Rajko Dujmić, leader of the pop band Novi Fosili, Prljavo Kazalište recorded a radio-friendly album, scoring the hit "Sve je lako kad si mlad" ("Everything Is Easy When You're Young"). The album also included a cover of the 1963 song "Milioner" ("Millionaire") by singer Zvonko Špišić. Backing vocals were recorded by veteran singer Zdenka Kovačiček and little-known Mladen Bodalec, formerly of the new wave band Patrola. After Brkić left the band to serve his mandatory stint in the Yugoslav army, the group went on a hiatus.

=== 1985–1990: Comeback with Bodalec as vocalist, new successes ===
The band made a comeback with the album Zlatne godine (Golden Years), released at the end of 1985 for Jugoton. Mladen Bodalec, who had appeared on the band's previous album as backing vocalist, debuted on Zlatne godine as the group's new frontman. The record was produced by Piko Stančić and marked the band's shift to mainstream pop rock sound, bringing the hits "Ne zovi mama doktora" ("Don't Call the Doctor, Mom"), "Ma kog me boga za tebe pitaju" ("Why In Heaven's Name Are They Asking Me About You") and "Sladoled" ("Ice Cream"), the latter sung by Houra and female vocalist Olja Duboja.

In 1988, Prljavo Kazalište released stylistically similar Zaustavite Zemlju (Stop the Earth), which included the hits "Zaustavite Zemlju", "Marina", "Moj bijeli labude" ("My White Swan") and "Slaži mi" ("Lie to Me"). The album included the song "Budala malena" ("Little Fool"), originally written by the band for the theatre play Povijest moje gluposti (History of My Stupidity). The album also included the song "Mojoj majci" ("To My Mother"), which Houra dedicated to his recently deceased mother. According to a list of top five best Croatian songs of all time compiled by RTL television show Croatian Number One published in 2021 and taking in account week at number one on charts, number of sales and air time, "Mojoj majci" ranked at number four. At that time, shortly before the upcoming breakup of Yugoslavia, tensions broke out between the constituent republics of the Yugoslav federation, so the issue of an eventual Croatian independence from Yugoslavia started to rise. Hence the verse "Zadnja ruža hrvatska" ("Last Croatian rose") made the song very popular in Croatia, especially in pro-independence part of Croatian public, which embraced it as a return to Croatian national sentiment, but also led to criticism in some parts of Yugoslavia due to (perceived) nationalist undertones, which were considered politically incorrect for the Yugoslav policy of brotherhood and unity. On 7 November 1988, the band performed on a large concert in Zagreb alongside three other most popular Zagreb-based bands of the time, Parni Valjak, Film and Psihomodo Pop. The recordings from the concert were released the following year on the double live album ZG Rock Forces.

In 1989, Marijan Brkić left Prljavo Kazalište, joining Parni Valjak, and was replaced by Damir Lipošek, formerly of ITD Band. On 17 October 1989, the new lineup held a large open-air concert in Zagreb's Republic Square in front of approximately 200,000 people. The recording of the concert was later broadcast on Television Zagreb. During the concert, Houra said into the microphone: "Nemojte mi srušiti trg, tu dolazi konj" ("Don't destroy the Square, it's where the horse will be"), alluding to the statue of ban Josip Jelačić removed from the square in 1946 by new communist authorities (and which would indeed be returned to the square a year later). However, Houra's statement was omitted from the recording broadcast on television. On the 1989 compilation album Sve je lako kad si mlad – Live, the band released live material from the concert held in November 1988 at the Zagreb's Dom Sportova, the recordings originally appearing on ZG Rock Forces, their early singles and the songs from their debut album. The record sleeve featured Mirko Ilić's design for the group's debut, but on the black background. During the same year, the band released the VHS Voljenom gradu (To the Beloved City).

In 1990, the band released Devedeseta (Ninetieth, as in 1990), produced by Mato Došen. The album was recorded with the band's first official keyboardist, Mladen Roško. Davorin Bogović made a guest appearance on the record, singing backing vocals alongside Vesna Došen. At the beginning of the 1990s, Prljavo Kazalište frequently played shows abroad for the Croatian diaspora.

=== 1991–1995: Yugoslav Wars ===
With the outbreak of the Croatian War of Independence in 1991, the group paused its activities. The band returned to the scene in 1993, the lineup featuring the new keyboardist Fedor Boić (formerly of ITD Band), with the album Lupi petama... (Click Your Heels...). The record cover featured a plate filled with bullets, and the album brought patriotic tunes like "Lupi petama, reci sve za Hrvatsku" ("Click Your Heels, Say You'll Do Everything for Croatia"), "Pet dana ratujem, subotom se zaljubljujem" ("I'm Fighting the War for Five Days, I Fall in Love on Saturdays"), and others. The group introduced elements of folk music in the track "Uzalud vam trud svirači" ("Your Effort's In Vain, Musicians"), which featured a traditional tamburica orchestra from Vinkovci. The band planned to hold a concert at Maksimir Stadium, but the authorities did not give the permission for the event, so the band, on 2 October 1993, held a concert in the studio of Radio Velika Gorica, releasing the recording of it on the 1994 live album Zabranjeni koncert (Forbidden Concert). In 1994, Prljavo Kazalište received the Porin Best Album Award for Lupi petama..., but also the Best Folk-Influenced Song Award for "Uzalud vam trud svirači" and the Best Video award for the recording of their concert in the building of Croatian National Theatre.

On 27 December 1994, the band held a concert at Zagreb's Dolac Market, at -4 °C. The group organized the concert in cooperation with the Society for Human Rights, receiving the Human Rights Award from the organization. The recording of the concert was released in 1995 on the live album Božićni koncert (Christmas Concert) through the label CBS formed by Houra, the label's name being a pun to CBS Records and the abbreviation for the title of the band's old album Crno bijeli svijet. The recording of the concert was also released on VHS.

=== 1996–2021: Post-war years, return to the regional scene ===
At the end of 1996, Prljavo Kazalište released their ninth studio album S vremena na vrijeme (From Time to Time). Released in a luxurious cover for Croatia Records, the album brought the songs with lyrics critical of the reality of newly independent Croatia, like "Sretan Božić gladna djeco" ("Merry Christmas, Hungry Children"), "Dođi sada Gospode" ("Come Now, Lord") and "Laku noć tebi Zagrebe" ("Good Night to You, Zagreb"). The recorded material was mixed and pre-mastered in London with the help of the band's former member Zoran Cvetković, and featured a guest appearance by Simple Minds drummer Mel Gaynor. On 17 November 1997, Prljavo Kazalište celebrated their 20th anniversary with a concert held at Zagreb's Vatroslav Lisinski Concert Hall and played with a symphony orchestra and a choir, with musical arrangements written by Igor Kuljerić. The concert featured more than 170 musicians, including guest appearances by Zoran Cvetković, Mel Gaynor and singers Josipa Lisac and Lidija Bajuk. The recording of the concert was released on the live album titled 20 godina (20 Years) through CBS. At the same time, the band's 20th anniversary was marked in Belgrade (in which the band had not performed since the outbreak of Yugoslav Wars), with a concert in Students' Cultural Center on which Don Savoni Band performed Prljavo Kazalište songs. On the New Year's Eve of 1997, Prljavo Kazalište held a large open-air concert on Ban Jelačić Square in Zagreb, directly broadcast by Croatian Radiotelevision.

At the end of 1998, the group released their tenth studio album Dani ponosa i slave (Days of Pride and Glory), produced by British producer Sarah Badingham. Once again, Houra criticized corrupt politicians and economical situation in Croatia in the songs like "Dobro jutro šezdesetosmaši" ("Good Morning, Protesters of 1968") and "Hrvatski velikani" ("Great Men of Croatia"). The album also featured political-themed interludes by young rap group Tram 11. Dani ponosa i slave was followed by a four-piece compilation box set Sve je lako kad si mlad, released in 2001.

In 2003, the band released the album Radio Dubrava through Dallas Records, recorded with new members Zlatko Bebek (formerly of Drugi Način and Crvena Jabuka, guitar) and Jurica Leikauff (keyboards). With their new songs, the band paid tribute to the Yugoslav new wave scene, but also returned to their mid-1980s classic rock sound and their late 1980s power ballads. The album included a cover of Pankrti song "Anarhist" ("Anarchist"), but with altered lyrics. The album's limited edition included bonus multimedia CD with the live versions of the songs "Mi plešemo" and "Marina", both recorded on the band's concert held at Ban Jelačić Square on the 2001 New Year's Eve, an interview with Houra by journalists Darko Glavan and Hrvoje Horvat, a video recording from the band's staying in New York City, and photographs. During the same year, the group released the DVD Prljavo Kazalište na trgu (Prljavo Kazalište at the Square), featuring two concerts held at Zagreb's central square, the first being their famous 17 October 1989 concert (at the time, the square was still named Republic Square), and the second being their 2001 New Year's Eve concert (after the square had been renamed to Ban Jelačić Square). In 2003, the band was also prominently featured in the rockumentary Sretno dijete, which was titled after a song from their first album and covered the Yugoslav new wave scene.

Their 2005 album Moj dom je Hrvatska (My Home Is Croatia) featured mostly love songs, with only the title track featuring social-related lyrics. After the album was released, Hrastek left the band and was replaced by bass guitarist Dubravko Vorih, and the band was also joined by guitarist Mario Zidar (formerly of Fantomi and Film). The new lineup recorded the 2008 double album Tajno ime (Secret Name). The album, recorded at Metalworks Studios in Mississauga, Ontario, included, alongside Prljavo Kazalište new songs, covers of their old songs "Sretno dijete", "Sve je lako kad si mlad" and "Kao" ("Like") recorded by the band Cappricorns. During the same year, the band released the box set Best of Live, which consisted of the CD with the recording of their concert held in front of the Zagreb Cathedral on 22 December 2003, and the DVD with the recording of the concert they held in Split's Stari plac stadium on 13 June 2006. On 2 October 2008, Houra and Bogović performed together for the first time after 25 years, on a concert in Zagreb's Tvornica organized in order to mark thirty years since the emergence of Yugoslav new wave scene. The recording of their performance appeared on the live album Sedmorica veličanstvenih – 30 godina kasnije (The Magnificent Seven – 30 Years Later), alongside recordings of performances by Električni Orgazam, Lačni Franz, Darko Rundek, Vlada Divljan i Nevladina Organizacija and Peter Lovšin i Španski Borci. On 17 January 2009, Prljavo Kazalište performed at the grand opening of Arena Zagreb, at the same time celebrating their 30th anniversary. The concert featured guest appearances by former members Davorin Bogović and Marijan Brkić. The recording of the concert was released later during the year on the double live album and DVD titled XXX godina (XXX Years).

In 2012, the band released their fourteenth studio album Možda dogodine (Maybe Next Year). The title track featured Houra and Bogović on lead vocals. During the year, the band held a concert at Belgrade Arena, returning to Belgrade after more than 20 years and performing in Serbia for the first time since the end of the Yugoslav Wars.

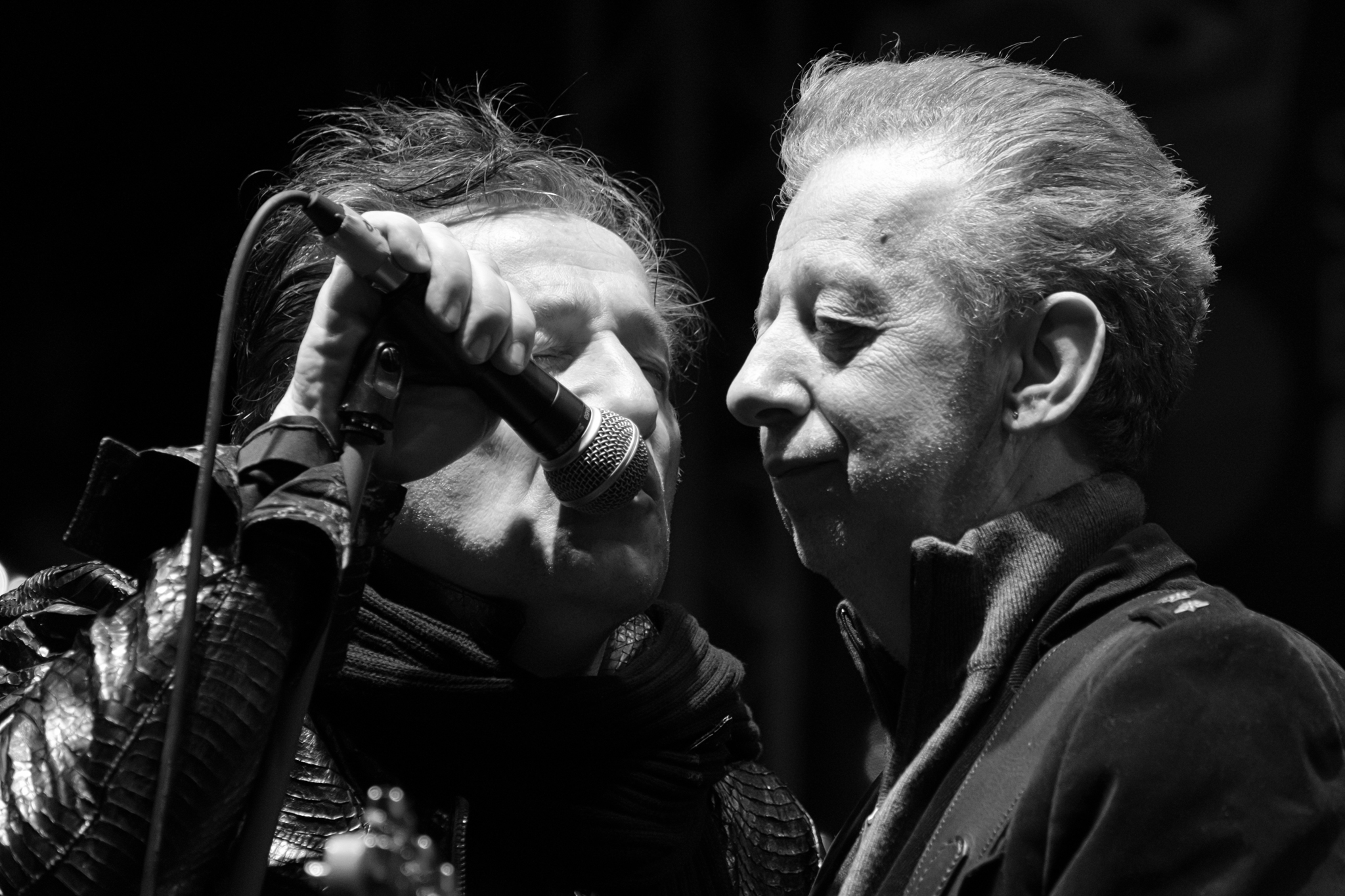
Mladen Bodalec and Jasenko Houra in 2017

In 2018, the band held a series of concerts across Canada, United States and Australia, concluding the tour on 31 May 2018 with a large open-air concert in Zagreb. The recording of the concert was released in 2019 on double CD and Blu-ray XL World Tour Finale Stadion Zagreb. The release featured a DVD with the recording of the band's 1994 Christmas concert. In 2019, Prljavo Kazalište was awarded with Charter of the Republic of Croatia by President of Croatia Kolinda Grabar-Kitarović. The band marked 30th anniversary of their 1989 Republic Square concert with two concerts in Arena Zagreb, on 18 and 19 October 2009. The recordings from the concerts were released in 2020 on the double CD and Blu-ray 30 godina od koncerta na Trgu, Arena Zagreb (Thirty Years Since the Concert at the Square, Arena Zagreb).

=== 2022–present: Division within the group ===
In 2022, the last two remaining members of the band's original lineup, Jasenko Houra and Tihomir Fileš, had a fallout, leading to Fileš trying to legally ban Houra and the rest of the group from performing under the name Prljavo Kazalište. Fileš claimed that the band was formed by Bogović and himself, with Houra joining on later, and that Prljavo Kazalište trademark was registered by himself. Houra stated that Fileš had registered the trademark only several years before the fallout, without Houra's and other members' knowledge, while Fileš claimed that he had notified band members about his actions. At the beginning of July 2022, as a part of the legal process, Houra's faction was temporarily banned from using the name Prljavo Kazalište on their live performances. However, less than a month later, on 29 July 2022, Zagreb Commercial Court lifted the ban, allowing Houra's faction to continue performing under the name Prljavo Kazalište. In 2023, Fileš founded a new band, also named Prljavo Kazalište, with Davorin Bogović and guitarist Alen Kraljić (formerly of Pips, Chips & Videoclips), who was later replaced by guitarist Saša Novak Radulović (formerly of Psihomodo Pop). In June 2023, Fileš stated that he had an official meeting with Houra and that "Houra doesn't seem to have a problem with the existence of two bands named Prljavo Kazalište". Houra himself refused to give any comments, stating that he had been focused on his band's new album.

In July 2023, Houra's and Bodalec's faction of the band released the singles "Stare navike" ("Old Habbits") and "Makni se" ("Step Aside"), announcing their new studio album. Meanwhile, Fileš's and Bogović's faction of the group released the album Underground, originally recorded during the COVID-19 pandemic and musically inspired by Prljavo Kazalište's punk rock and new wave roots.

== Influence, legacy and criticism ==
Prljavo Kazalište is generally considered one of the most prominent and influential acts of the Yugoslav new wave scene, and their early works have been widely praised for their rebellious attitude and social-related lyrics. The band enjoyed large popularity during their initial punk rock and new wave phase, and has continued to enjoy large popularity after their shift to mainstream rock and pop rock sound in mid-1980s. In Croatia they have enjoyed the status of the most popular rock band (alongside Parni Valjak) since the early 1990s, and their work continues to enjoy large popularity in other former Yugoslav republics. However, despite never promoting chauvinism and continuing to perform in other former Yugoslav republics after the end of the Yugoslav Wars, the band's late 1980s and early 1990s patriotic songs have often led to the group being accused in Croatia and rest of the region of flirting with nationalism. Additionally, despite social commentary in their late 1990s works, the band has performed on Croatian Democratic Union 2003 and 2009 electoral rallies, which led to negative reactions by a part of Croatian public and the group being labeled as "state band". In 2019, Prljavo Kazalište was awarded with Charter of the Republic of Croatia by President of Croatia Kolinda Grabar-Kitarović. Houra has denounced accusations of nationalism on numerous occasions, describing the band's early 1990s patriotic songs as "švejkian". In a 2015 interview for Novi magazin, Davorin Bogović stated: "The only thing I envy Prljavo Kazalište is the money. [...] If I had stayed with them, to gain that money I would have to lick certain body parts of politicians, and I have always hated them. [...] Simply put, to relate with those circles—and we started off as anarchist kids, who considered politics and politicians their mortal enemies—it doesn't suit me."

The song "Mojoj majci" was in the late 1980s embraced by nationalist and pro-independence parts of Croatian public as the announcement of return to Croatian national sentiment. In the early 1990s, the song was used by Savka Dabčević-Kučar and her Croatian People's Party in an electoral campaign. After Dabčević died in 2009, Houra stated in an interview for Jutarnji list: "'Ruža hrvatska' was indeed, as I have stated on numerous occasions, dedicated to someone, to my mother, which is suggested by the song's [real] title ['Mojoj majci']. Of course, soon I became aware of the fact that the song had gained other connotations. So, of course, I had no problem with the fact that some people thought it was dedicated to Slavka Kučar and with the fact she used it in her campaign." The song was, under the title "Ruža hrvatska", covered by Croatian and Yugoslav singer Duško Lokin on his 1989 album Najljepše hrvatske rodoljubne pjesme (The Most Beautiful Croatian Patriotic Songs). The song was covered during the same year by singer Frank Kalabrić Franky on his album Ruža hrvatska, titled after the song.

Serbian and Yugoslav psychobilly musician Toni Montano covered the band's ballad "449 (Svaki put kad odlaziš)" ("449 (Everytime You Leave)"), under the title "Odlaziš (1984–1990)" ("You're Leaving (1984–1990)"), on his 1991 album Lovac na novac (Money Hunter), and the band's song "Široke ulice" on his 1999 album Srećan rođendan (Happy Birthday). Croatian dance-pop group Karma covered "Zaustavite Zemlju" on their 2001 album Sedam dana (Seven Days). The song "Sretno dijete" was covered by Croatian world music band Postolar Tripper on their 2007 album Zamisli život u ritmu cipela za ples (Imagine a Life in the Rhythm of Dancing Shoes). The band's song "Iz nekih starih razloga" ("Out of Some Old Reasongs") was covered by Croatian pop singer Ivana Kindl on her 2010 album Promjenljiva (Unstable). A Polish cover version of the Prljavo Kazalište's song "Crno bijeli svijet", translated as "Czarno-Biały Świat" and performed by Kazik, was included in the 2001 tribute album Yugoton, a tribute to the Yugoslav rock scene by Polish artists. In 2003, an album of symphonic covers of Prljavo Kazalište songs was released, entitled Filharmonijski virtualni orkestar izvodi Prljavo Kazalište (Philharmonic Virtual Orchestra Performs Prljavo Kazalište). Zagreb-based rock band Široke Ulice, formed in 2012, chose their name after Prljavo Kazalište song.

In 1998, Crno bijeli svijet was ranked as the 36th on the list of 100 Greatest Albums of Yugoslav Popular Music in the book YU 100: najbolji albumi jugoslovenske rok i pop muzike (YU 100: The Best Albums of Yugoslav Pop and Rock Music). In 2015, Prljavo Kazalište was polled No.23 and Crno bijeli svijet was polled No.24 on the list of 100 Greatest Yugoslav Albums published by the Croatian edition of Rolling Stone.

In 2000, "Mi plešemo" was polled No.49, "Crno bijeli svijet" was polled No.74, "Ma kog me boga za tebe pitaju" was polled No.77 and "Marina" was polled No.93 on the Rock Express Top 100 Yugoslav Rock Songs of All Times list. In 2006, "Mi plešemo" was polled No.42 and "Crno bijeli svijet" was polled No.60 on the B92 Top 100 Yugoslav songs list.

The lyrics of the band's songs "U mojoj općini problema nema" ("There Are No Problems in My Municipality"), "Sretno dijete", "Čovjek za sutra", "Nove cipele", "Moderna djevojka" ("Modern Girl") and "Neka te ništa ne brina" ("Nothing Should Worry You") were featured in Petar Janjatović's Pesme bratstva, detinjstva & potomstva: Antologija ex YU rok poezije 1967 - 2007 (Songs of Brotherhood, Childhood & Offspring: Anthology of Ex YU Rock Poetry 1967 – 2007).

=== Books ===
The band has been a subject of several books:

- Lupi petama (1993);
- Božićni koncert 1994 (1995), dealing with the band's 1994 Christmas concert;
- Prljavo Kazalište (1996), dealing with the band's tour across Canada, United States, and Australia;
- Sve je lako kad si mlad (2001) by Darko Glavan and Hrvoje Horvat, an authorized biography of the band.

== Discography ==
=== Studio albums ===
- Prljavo Kazalište (1979)
- Crno bijeli svijet (1980)
- Heroj ulice (1981)
- Korak od sna (1983)
- Zlatne godine (1985)
- Zaustavite Zemlju (1988)
- Devedeseta (1990)
- Lupi petama... (1993)
- S vremena na vrijeme (1996)
- Dani ponosa i slave (1998)
- Radio Dubrava (2003)
- Moj dom je Hrvatska (2005)
- Tajno ime (2008)
- Možda dogodine (2012)

=== Live albums ===
- Sve je lako kad si mlad – Live (1989)
- Zabranjeni koncert (1994)
- Božićni koncert (1995)
- 20 godina (1997)
- XXX godina (2009)
- XL World Tour Finale Stadion Zagreb (2019)
- 30 godina od koncerta na Trgu - Arena Zagreb (2020)

=== Compilation albums ===
- Najveći hitovi (1994)
- Sve je lako kad si mlad '77 – '99 (box set; 2001)
- Rock balade (2004)
- Single Collection '79–'90 (2010)
- Greatest Hits Collection (2017)

=== Box sets ===
- Sve je lako kad si mlad (2001)
- Millenium Collection (2008)
- Best of Live (2008)

=== Video albums ===
- Lupi petama (1993)
- Božićni koncert (1995)
- Prljavo Kazalište (1996)
- Prljavo Kazalište na Trgu (2003)
- XXX godina (2009)
- XL World Tour Finale Stadion Zagreb (2019)
- 30 godina od koncerta na Trgu - Arena Zagreb (2020)

=== Singles ===
- "Televizori" / "Majka" / "Moje djetinjstvo" (1978)
- 'Moj je otac bio u ratu" / "Noć" (1978)
- "Moderna djevojka" / "Crno bijeli svijet" (1980)
- "...Mojoj majci" / "Topoteka House Mix" / "Marina" (1989)
- "Dođi sada Gospode" (1996)
- "Tamni slapovi" (2014)
- "Stare navike" (2023)
- "Makni se" (2023)
- "Molim Boga da svane" (2024)
- "Djeca su OK" (2024)

==== Charted singles ====
Title	Year	Peak chart positions	Album
Title	Year	CRO	Album
"Stare navike"	2023	2	Non-album single
"—" denotes releases that did not chart or were not released in that territory.

=== Other appearances ===
- Novi punk val (1978)
- ZG Rock Forces (1997)
- Sretno dijete – originalna glazba iz filma (2004)
