= Jasenko Houra =

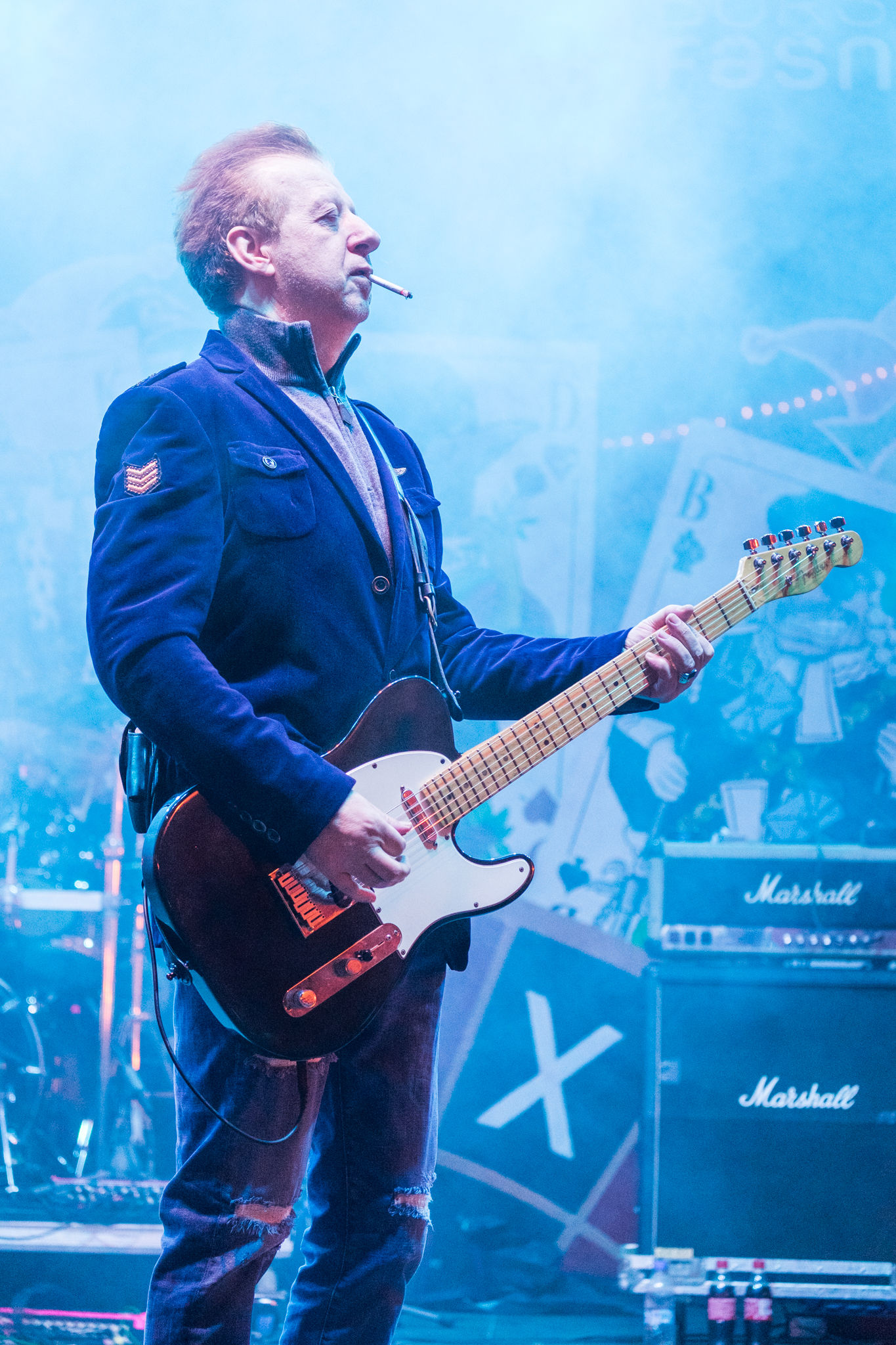
- Houra performing with Prljavo Kazalište in 2017

Background information
- Born: 3 June 1960 (age 66); Virovitica, PR Croatia, FPR Yugoslavia
- Genres: Punk rock; new wave; rock; pop rock; power pop; folk rock
- Occupations: Guitarist, singer, songwriter
- Instruments: Guitar, vocals
- Years active: 1977–present
- Labels: Jugoton, Suzy, Crno Bijeli Svijet Records, InterService, Croatia Records, Dallas Records, Hit Records

Jasenko Houra (born 3 June 1960) is a Croatian and former Yugoslav rock musician, best known as the guitarist, occasional vocalist, leader and principal songwriter of the popular band Prljavo Kazalište.

Houra started his musical career in 1977 at the age of 17, when he formed Prljavo Kazalište with the members of the band Ciferšlus. The group gained popularity with their punk rock self-titled debut, establishing themselves as one of the most prominent acts of the Yugoslav new wave scene with their second, more ska-oriented album Crno bijeli svijet. After the group's vocalist Davorin Bogović was excluded from the group in 1981, Houra took over lead vocal duties for the band's third album Heroj ulice, with which they moved towards more conventional rock sound. Bogović returned in 1983, and was later replaced by Mladen Bodalec, Houra continuing to occasionally provide lead vocals for some of the band's tracks. He has been Prljavo Kazalište's principal composer and lyricist since its formation, and since 2022 remains the only original member of the band's original incarnation.

== Musical career ==
=== Prljavo Kazalište (1977–present) ===
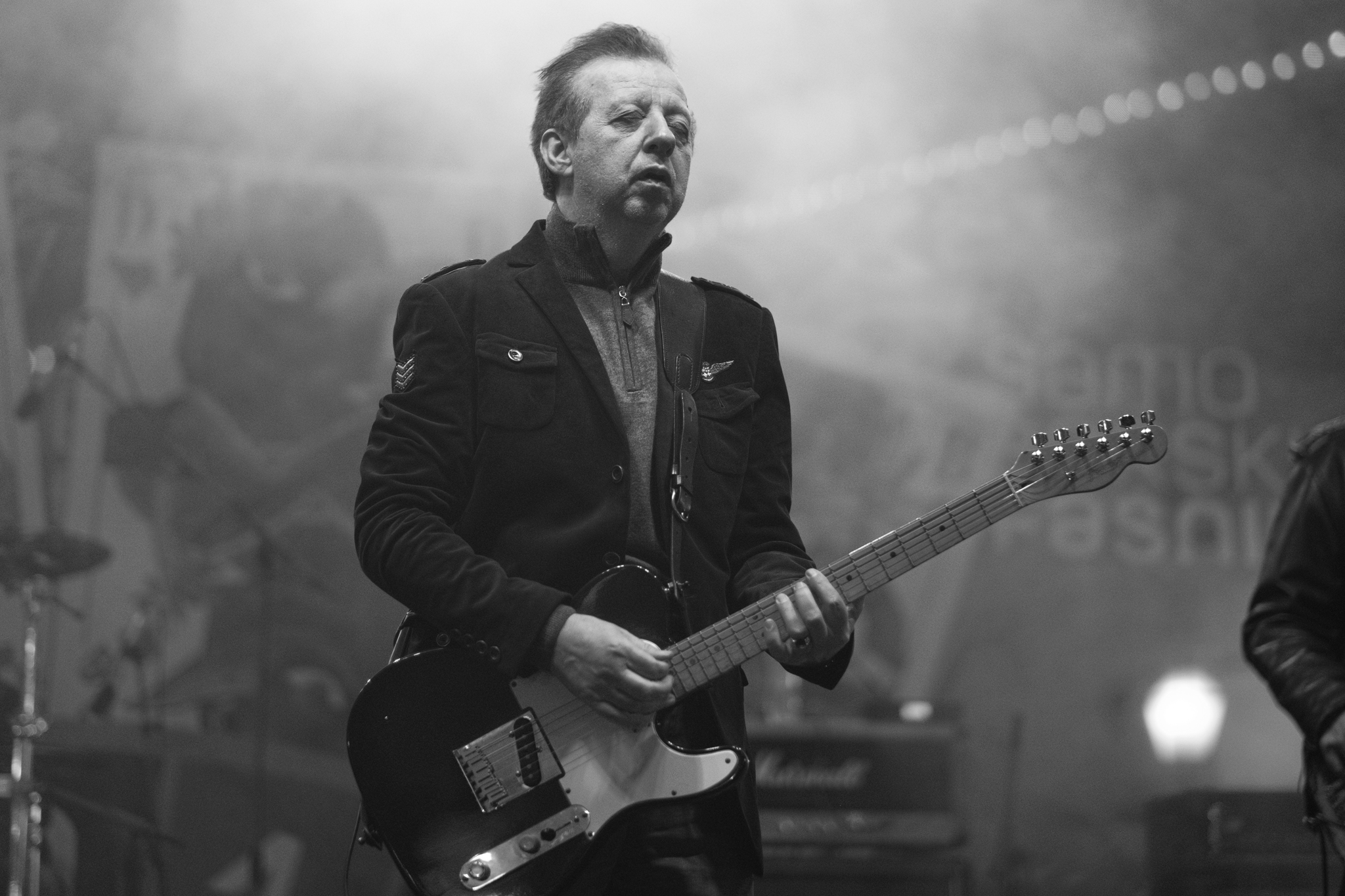
Houra performing with Prljavo Kazalište in Samobor in 2017

Houra started his career at the age of 17, when he joined the members of Zagreb-based band Ciferšlus (Zipper), Davorin Bogović (vocals), Zoran Cvetković "Zok" (guitar), Nino Hrastek (bass guitar) and Tihomir Fileš (drums). With Houra's arrival in the autumn of 1977, the group started performing under the name Prljavo Kazalište. The band soon gained attention of the Yugoslav public and media with their punk rock sound and their 7-inch singles. Houra debuted as vocalist in the track "Noć", released in 1978 as the B-side of the band's second single "Moj otac je bio u ratu" ("My Father Fought in the War"). The band's debut self-titled album, released in 1979, brought them considerable popularity and critical acclaim, largely owing to Houra's provocative lyrics with direct social commentary. With their following release, Crno bijeli svijet (Black and White World), the group moved towards ska- and 2 Tone-influenced sound, establishing themselves as one of the leading acts of the Yugoslav new wave scene. After the band's frontman Davorin Bogović was excluded from the group in 1981, Houra provided lead vocals for the band's third studio album Heroj ulice (Hero of the Street), released in 1982, with which the group moved towards more conventional rock sound. Bogović returned for the band's 1983 album Korak od sna (One Step Away from the Dream), and was replaced by Mladen Bodalec for the band's fifth album Zlatne godine (Golden Years), released in 1985. Houra has remained the band's guitarist and principal songwriter, occasionally providing lead vocals for some of the band's songs, the group establishing itself during the 1990s as one of the most popular Croatian rock acts. After the 2022 fallout between the last two remaining original members of the group, Houra and drummer Tihomir Fileš, two incarnations of the band were formed, one led by Houra and fronted by Bodalec, and the second led by Fileš and fronted by Bogović, Houra thus remaining the only original member of the band's original incarnation.

=== Other activities ===
In the early 1990s, Houra formed the music label CBS, the name being a pun to CBS Records and the abbreviation for the title of the band's 1980 album Crno bijeli svijet. The label has released Prljavo Kazalište albums, as well as albums of Croatian traditional music.

== Legacy and criticism ==
Houra's late 1970s and early 1980s lyrics have been widely praised for their social commentary and for describing the reality of the Yugoslav youth of the era. However, his early 1990s patriotic songs, recorded by Prljavo Kazalište during the Croatian War of Independence, have often been perceived as nationalistic in other former Yugoslav republics, especially in Serbia. Houra's song "Mojoj majci" ("To My Mother"), written by himself in 1988 and dedicated to his recently deceased mother, would become one of Prljavo Kazalište's most popular and most controversial songs. At that time, shortly before the upcoming breakup of Yugoslavia, tensions broke out between the constituent republics of the Yugoslav federation, so the issue of an eventual Croatian independence from Yugoslavia started to rise. Hence the verse "Zadnja ruža Hrvatska" ("Last Croatian rose") made the song very popular in Croatia—especially in pro-independence part of Croatian public, which embraced it as a return to Croatian national sentiment—but also led to criticism in some parts of Yugoslavia due to (perceived) nationalist undertones, which were considered politically incorrect for the Yugoslav policy of brotherhood and unity. Houra has denounced accusations of nationalism on numerous occasions, describing the band's 1990s patriotic songs as "švejkian".

In 1998, the album Crno bijeli svijet was ranked as the 36th on the list of 100 Greatest Albums of Yugoslav Popular Music in the book YU 100: najbolji albumi jugoslovenske rok i pop muzike (YU 100: The Best Albums of Yugoslav Pop and Rock Music). In 2015, Prljavo Kazalište was polled No.23 and Crno bijeli svijet was polled No.24 on the list of 100 Greatest Yugoslav Albums published by the Croatian edition of Rolling Stone.

In 2000, four Prljavo Kazalište songs appeared on the Rock Express Top 100 Yugoslav Rock Songs of All Times list: "Mi plešemo" ("We Dance") polled No.49, "Crno bijeli svijet" polled No.74, "Ma kog me boga za tebe pitaju" ("Why in the Heaven's Name Are They Asking Me about You") polled No.77 and "Marina" polled No.93. In 2011, "Mi plešemo" was polled No.42 and "Crno bijeli svijet" was polled No.60 on the B92 Top 100 Yugoslav songs list.

Houra's lyrics for the songs "U mojoj općini problema nema" ("There Are No Problems in My Municipality"), "Sretno dijete" ("Happy Child"), "Nove cipele" ("New Shoes"), "Moderna djevojka" ("Modern Girl") and "Neka te ništa ne brina" ("Nothing Should Worry You") were included in Petar Janjatović's Pesme bratstva, detinjstva & potomstva: Antologija ex YU rok poezije 1967 - 2007 (Songs of Brotherhood, Childhood & Offspring: Anthology of Ex YU Rock Poetry 1967 – 2007).

== Discography ==
=== With Prljavo Kazalište ===
==== Studio albums ====
- Prljavo Kazalište (1979)
- Crno bijeli svijet (1980)
- Heroj ulice (1981)
- Korak od sna (1983)
- Zlatne godine (1985)
- Zaustavite Zemlju (1988)
- Devedeseta (1990)
- Lupi petama... (1993)
- S vremena na vrijeme (1996)
- Dani ponosa i slave (1998)
- Radio Dubrava (2003)
- Moj dom je Hrvatska (2005)
- Tajno ime (2008)
- Možda dogodine (2012)

==== Live albums ====
- Sve je lako kad si mlad – Live (1989)
- Zabranjeni koncert (1994)
- Božićni koncert (1995)
- 20 godina (1997)
- XXX godina (2009)
- XL World Tour Finale Stadion Zagreb (2019)
- 30 godina od koncerta na Trgu - Arena Zagreb (2020)

==== Compilation albums ====
- Najveći hitovi (1994)
- Sve je lako kad si mlad '77 – '99 (box set; 2001)
- Rock balade (2004)
- Single Collection '79–'90 (2010)
- Greatest Hits Collection (2017)

==== Box sets ====
- Sve je lako kad si mlad (2001)
- Millenium Collection (2008)
- Best of Live (2008)

==== Video albums ====
- Lupi petama (1993)
- Božićni koncert (1995)
- Prljavo Kazalište (1996)
- Prljavo Kazalište na Trgu (2003)
- XXX godina (2009)
- XL World Tour Finale Stadion Zagreb (2019)
- 30 godina od koncerta na Trgu - Arena Zagreb (2020)

==== Singles ====
- "Televizori" / "Majka" / "Moje djetinjstvo" (1978)
- 'Moj je otac bio u ratu" / "Noć" (1978)
- "Moderna djevojka" / "Crno bijeli svijet" (1980)
- "...Mojoj majci" / "Topoteka House Mix" / "Marina" (1989)
- "Dođi sada Gospode" (1996)
- "Tamni slapovi" (2014)
- "Stare navike" (2023)
- "Makni se" (2023)
- "Molim Boga da svane" (2024)
- "Djeca su OK" (2024)

===== Charted singles =====
Title	Year	Peak chart positions	Album
Title	Year	CRO	Album
"Stare navike"	2023	2	Non-album single
"—" denotes releases that did not chart or were not released in that territory.
