= Leteći odred =

Croatian pop band

Leteći Odred
- Origin: Osijek, Croatia
- Genres: Pop, pop rock, alternative rock
- Years active: 1991–present
- Labels: DEA Music, Orfej, Dallas Records, Dancing Bear, Croatia Records
- Members: Denis Dumančić; Dino Bandić; Alen Opačić-Hrvat; Tomislav Mihaljević; Martin Petračić
- Past members: Hrvoje Hum; Marijan Kiš; Miroslav Lesić; Kristijan Zorijan; Damir Galeković; Krunoslav Ringsmuth; Alen Vekić; Nenad Borić

Leteći odred is a Croatian pop rock band from the city of Osijek that was popular in the mid-1990s. Its name means "Flying Squad" in Croatian. They formed in 1991 with Denis Dumančić.

The group's serious music career began in 1992, when it was discovered by Husein Hasanefendić, known as Hus, a recognized and reputable author and leader of the Parni Valjak, who along with Marijan Brkic-Brko stood behind the project and the ability to shoot and issuance of original songs by Denis Dumančić. The first album by Leteći odred, titled Među Zvijezdama (Among the stars), was released in late 1992. Among the 10 or so highly acclaimed songs were "Neka Neveni ne venu" (Don't let marigold wither) and "Kao stari moj" (As my old man), which were well received by the audience and the media. In 1993, Leteći Odred performed at the first Croatian Eurovision, i.e. "Crovizija", with the song "Cijeli je svijet zaljubljen" (The whole world is in love).

== History ==
=== 1994–1996: Beginnings ===
In late 1994, Leteći Odred released the album Kada Odletim (When I fly away), issued by the label "Orfej". Some of its notable songs were "Ja se budim" (I'm waking up) and "U mojoj glavi ima sudara" (There's crashes in my head), and "Heroji ne plaču" (Heroes don't cry), written by Miroslav Škoro, and performed in duet.

In 1995, Leteći Odred performed at the Croatian Eurovision, i.e. "Crovizija", with the song "Pišem ti pismo" (I'm writing you a letter).

=== 1996-1999: Mainstream Success ===
In 1996, Leteći Odred released their third album, Od Prevlake do Dunava (From Prevlaka to Dunav). Songs like "Od Prevlake do Dunava" (From Prevlaka to Dunav), "Kao ja ne kužim" (Like I don't get it), "Teta" (Aunt), "Večeras je dušo rođendan tvoj" (Tonight is your birthday, Honey), "Uzalud je mjesečina" (Moonlight is in vain) and "A bez vina" (Without wine) became big hits. The album sold more than 20,000 copies. The band then started a major promotional tour in Croatia, Slovenia, Germany, Switzerland and Austria, which included more than a hundred concerts and lasted for a year. A big concert at Dom sportova in Zagreb marked the end of tour, from which there is a videotape, "Zagreb za Valentinovo" (Zagreb for Valentine's Day).

In 1997 they released their fourth album, Kuda ide ovaj vlak (Whither goes the train). It included the song "Sanjao sam moju Ružicu" (I dreamed my Ružica), which even before the release of the album became a big hit and was ranked first in the nation's top charts for more than three months. "Hajde cigane" (Go gypsy) and "Lijepa je naša puna odlikaša" (Beautiful our land full of straight-A students) are some of the most famous songs from the fourth album, which the public and media particularly well received. That year, Leteci Odred went on tour again, which included hundreds of concerts around Croatia, Bosnia and Slovenia, and again sold out a concert at the Dom sportova for Valentine's Day in 1998. By the end of 1998, the album had sold more than 30,000 copies and became the best selling album of Leteci Odred so far.

In 1998, due to a series of promotional and other obligations around his music career, Denis Dumančić moved with his family in Zagreb and began a collaboration with other artists and performers on the Croatian music scene.

In early 1999, the fifth album, Vrijeme (Time), was released for a new record label, Dallas Records, which signed an exclusive contract. It reached a circulation of over 17,000 copies. Prominent songs from the album were "Priznajem" (I admit), "Zbog tebe oženiti se neću" (Because of you I won't get married), and "Neka veselo je" (Let it be merry). The album was rated by critics as definitely the most mature and best album of Leteći Odred.

=== Early 2000s ===
In 2000, Leteći Odred announced their sixth album, with the song "Zao mi je" (I'm sorry), which was performed at the Croatian Radio Festival and became a big hit. The album was titled Daj mi sebe (Give me yourself). The song "Daj mi sebe" (Give me yourself) was remembered for extraordinary airplay, and became the third most performed song in 2001 on the basis of reported performance by Croatian radio and TV stations. Other songs from the album were "Zao mi je" (I'm sorry), "Vrištao bih cijele noći" (I'd scream all night long), "Hej lutkice" (Hey, baby) and "Tebi mogu reći sve" (I can tell anything to you).

The group has often held solo concerts to raise money for charitable concerts and campaigns. For the humanitarian action "Dajmo da čuju" (Let them hear), under the auspices of the Croatian Caritas, Denis Dumančić composed the song "Od srca mog" (From my heart) performed by the Croatian band aid, where it participated with twenty famous local artists such as Oliver Dragojević, Doris Dragović, Zdenka Kovačićek, Gibonni, Severina, Colonia, Petar Grašo, Vesna Pisarović, Gazde, Magazin, Goran Karan, Jasmin Stavros, Ivana Banfić, Nina Badrić, Danijela Martinović, Jole, Mladen Bodalec and Aki Rahimovski.

In 2002, Leteći Odred started a big birthday concert, again for Valentine's Day, in Zagreb's Dom sportova, celebrating 10 years of existence. That same year, Denis with his frequent collaborator on texts Faruk Buljubačić - Fayu composed the song for the IDF "Ja sam mali Mate" (I'm little Mate), with which Mali Mate and Leteći Odred represented the Croatian Radio Festival.

During 2002, the album Uživo (Live) was released, which represented a complete cross-section of Leteći Odred's career. It included the band's greatest hits recorded live in Zagreb at Dom sportova, and a bonus track - a duet with Alka Vuica entitled "Hajde ne laži meni" (C'mon don't lie to me).

In 2004, after almost four years since the previous studio album, Leteći Odred returned with their seventh album, Razglednice (Postcards), published by Dallas Records. This marked a return to the band's old, recognizable sound and songs like those that marked several generations of youth. The album included the song "Kažu" (They say), the first hit single which occupied the tops of the radio charts for weeks, and the "Šuti" (Hush) which introduced Leteći Odred at the Croatian radio festival. Notable songs from this album were "Šta je tu je" (It's what it is) and "Jednu mladost imam" (I only have one youth), which at that time was recognized as the "anthem" of graduates.

This was the last album with the band's first lineup: Denis Dumančić on vocals, Allen Vekić on guitar, Hrvoje Hum on bass, Marian Kiss on keyboards and Damir Gleković-Taban on drums.

=== Comeback ===
After more than a three and half year break, Leteći odred, in cooperation with the publishing house Dancing Bear, released the album Jutro poslije brijanja (Morning after seducing) in early July 2007. It included the singles "Ljubav nije matematika" (Love is not math) and "Bez obaveza" (No Strings Attached).

In the pauses between tracks Denis Dumančić wrote songs for a number of famous artists from the Croatian music scene. Denis in recent years on the Croatian music scene had become one of the most performed authors on the basis of reports by the Croatian Composers Society, and enjoyed the status of an artist recognized by the Croatian Ministry of Culture. In his musical accomplishments were many kinds of songs, ranging from children's pop-rock to tambour, Dalmatian and entertaining songs. He has worked with many famous and renowned authors and performers of Croatian music scene. His songs can be found on albums by Massimo, Željko Bebek, Boris Novković, Hari Mata Hari, Danijela Martinović, Ivana Banfić, Jasmin Stavros, Alka Vuica, Jole, Gazde, Crvena jabuka, Prva liga, Maja Šuput, Lea, Kemal Montena, Vinko Coce, Zlatko Pejaković and many others.

In its 18th year on the Croatian music scene, the group celebrated by releasing their 11th album, Najbolje od odreda (The Best of Odred), which was released after a slight delay in May 2011 by Dallas Records. This double album includes the 35 most famous songs by Leteći odred, selected from the 10 studio albums the group released so far. As a bonus there are two new songs: "Studeni" (November), in which a guest joins Kristijan Kiki Rahimovski, and "Dok se kunes" (While you swear).

The twentieth anniversary of Leteći odred was marked with a big concert at the Tvornica kulture in Zagreb.

=== Present day ===
Currently, Leteći odred is preparing a new album, whose release was expected in the fall of 2013. The singles "Studeni" (November), "Možeš ti sve što hoćeš" (You can do whatever you want), "Svaki dan je s tobom poseban" (Every day is special with you), "Ljubavi" (Love) have been announced. The album will also have the bonus song "Čini mi se brate" (It looks like so, brother), sung by three generations of musicians.

== Discography ==
- 1992: Među zvijezdama (Among the stars)
- 1994: Kada odletim (When I fly away)
- 1996: Od Prevlake do Dunava (From Prevlaka to Dunav)
- 1997: Kuda ide ovaj vlak (Whither goes the train)
- 1998: The Best of Letećeg odreda (The Best of Leteći Odred)
- 1999: Vrijeme (Time)
- 2001: Daj mi sebe (Give me yourself)
- 2002: Uživo Leteći odred (Leteći odred Live)
- 2004: Razglednice (Postcards)
- 2007: Jutro poslije brijanja (Morning after seducing)
- 2011: Najbolje od odreda (The Best of Odred)
- 2013: Agent za ljubav (Love agent)
- 2020: Uspomene (Memories)
