= Davorin Bogović =

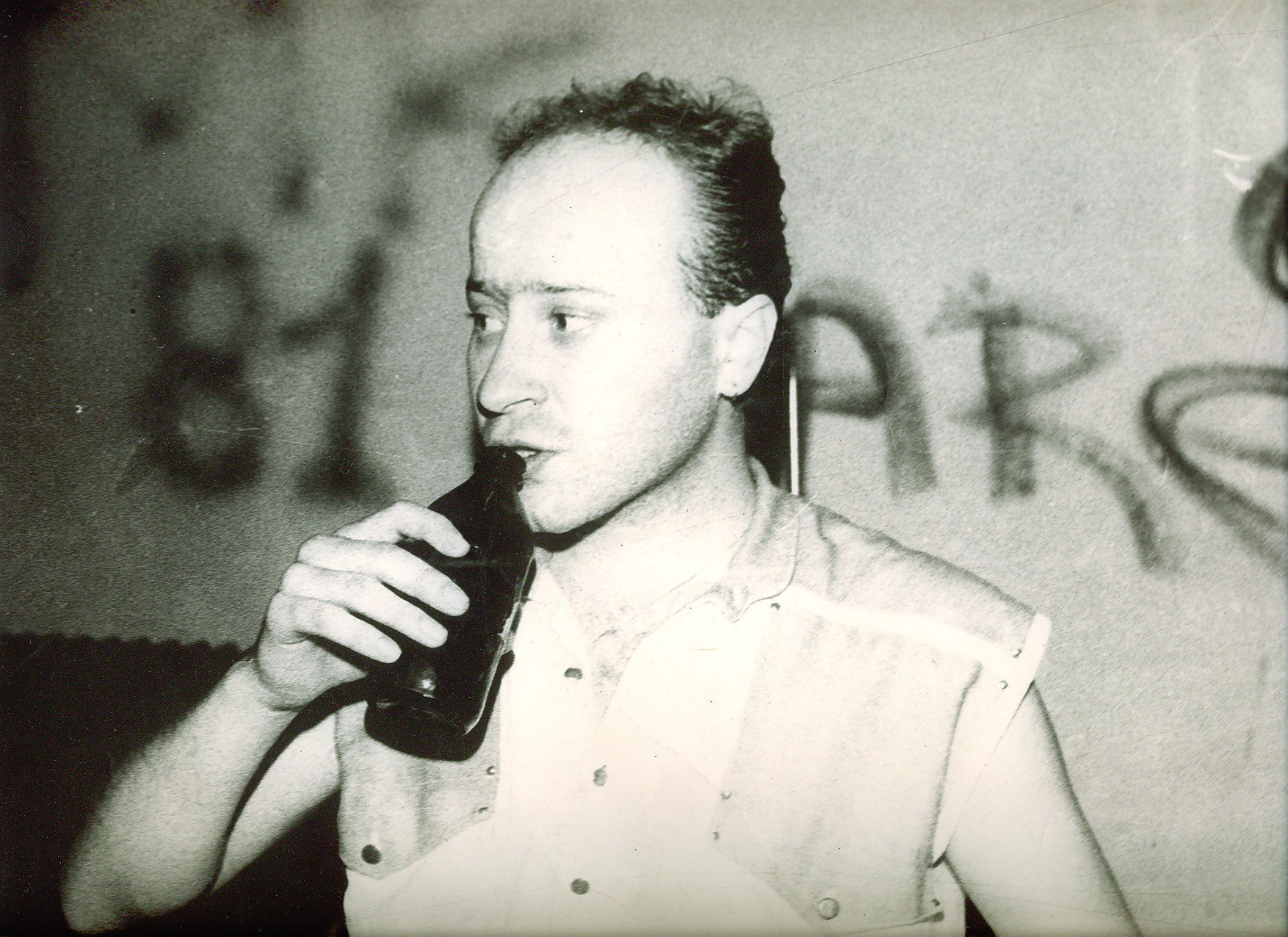
- Davorin Bogović in 1981

Background information
- Born: 23 June 1960 (age 66); Zagreb, PR Croatia, FPR Yugoslavia
- Genres: Punk rock; new wave; rock
- Occupation: Singer
- Instrument: Vocals
- Years active: 1977–present
- Labels: Jugoton, Suzy, Croatia Records, Dallas Records
- Formerly of: Prljavo Kazalište

Davorin Bogović (born 23 March 1960) is a Croatian and Yugoslav rock musician. Best known as the original vocalist of the popular band Prljavo Kazalište, Bogović is often described as one of the most notable figures of the Yugoslav new wave scene.

Bogović fronted Prljavo Kazalište during their initial punk rock and new wave phase, recording the albums Prljavo Kazalište (1979) and Crno bijeli svijet (1980) with the group. He was excluded from the band prior to recording of their third studio album, but returned to the group for their fourth album Korak od sna (1983). After leaving Prljavo Kazalište, Bogović has released two solo albums, acted in theatre and on television and collaborated with a number of prominent music artists, also making guest appearances on Prljavo Kazalište albums and concerts on several occasions. In 2022, after a fallout between last two remaining original members of Prljavo Kazalište, guitarist Jasenko Houra and drummer Tihomir Fileš, Fileš left the group to form his own faction, fronted by Bogović and also named Prljavo Kazalište. With the group, Bogović recorded their 2023 album Underground.

== Musical career ==
=== Prljavo Kazalište (1977–1981, 1983), later collaborations with the band ===
Bogović started his career in the late 1970s in the Zagreb-based band Ciferšlus (Zipper), consisting of him, guitarist Zoran Cvetković "Zok", bass guitarist Nino Hrastek and drummer Tihomir Fileš. In 1977, the four were joined by guitarist Jasenko Houra, the group changing their name to Prljavo Kazalište. The band gained the attention of the Yugoslav public and the media with their punk rock sound and social-related lyrics. Their debut self-titled album was released in 1979, to large media attention and critical acclaim. With their following release, the 1980 ska- and 2 Tone-oriented album Crno bijeli svijet (Black and White World), the group established themselves as one of the most prominent acts of the Yugoslav new wave scene. Following the promotional tour, the band started to prepare their third studio album, but the beginning of the recording sessions was postponed several times. Frustrated, Bogović took a vacation, travelling to Yugoslav seaside. When the recording sessions were finally scheduled, the rest of the members did not manage to contact him. Angry at Bogović due to his irresponsibility, they decided to exclude him from the band, Jasenko Houra taking over the vocal duties for the album recording. Bogović returned to Prljavo Kazalište in 1983, for the recording of more mainstream-oriented album Korak od sna (One Step from the Dream). After the promotional tour, the group went on hiatus, which ended Bogović's stint with the band.

Despite ending his cooperation with Prljavo Kazalište in the mid-1980s, Bogović would make a guest appearance on their 1990 album Devedeseta (Ninetieth), appearing on the record as a backing vocalist. On 2 October 2008, Bogović and Jasenko Houra performed live together for the first time after 25 years, on a concert in Zagreb's Tvornica organized in order to mark thirty years since the emergence of Yugoslav new wave scene. The recording of their performance appeared on the live album Sedmorica veličanstvenih – 30 godina kasnije (The Magnificent Seven – 30 Years Later), alongside recordings of performances by Električni Orgazam, Lačni Franz, Darko Rundek, Vlada Divljan i Nevladina Organizacija and Peter Lovšin i Španski Borci. In 2012, Bogović once again made a guest appearance on Prljavo Kazalište album, on the album Možda dogodine (Maybe Next Year), singing lead vocals with Houra in the title track.

=== Solo career ===
Bogović released his first solo album in 1998. The album was entitled Sretno dijete (Happy Child), after an old Prljavo Kazalište song. The album was recorded with Bogović's newly-formed backing band, named Bogovići (The Bogovićs) and featuring Alan Zlopaša (guitar), Luka Nekić (guitar), Siniša Radaković (bass guitar) and Željko Dijaković (drums). The album was produced by another former Prljavo Kazalište member, Marijan Brkić, and included, alongside songs authored by Bogović, a cover of The Clash's "Lost in the Supermarket", entitled "Izgubio sam dragu ženu" ("I Lost a Woman Dear to Me"), and a cover of Serge Gainsbourg's "Je t'aime... moi non plus", entitled "Je t'aime... (Moja voljena–moi non plus)".

In 2001, on the concert held at the opening of Andy Warhol exhibit in Zagreb's Tvornica, Bogović performed a cover of Velvet Underground song "There She Goes Again", later released on the various artists live album The Velvet Bananas.

Bogović recorded his 2012 album Mijene (Changes) with a new lineup of Bogovići, featuring Ernest Vinković (formerly of Drugi Način, guitar), Leo Anđelković (guitar), Boris Hrepić (formerly of Daleka Obala, bass guitar) and Tomislav Hajak (drums). Most of the album songs were authored by Hrepić. The Dalmatian music-inspired "Prike" ("Buddies") featured guest appearance by Neno Belan.

Bogović's 2020 compilation album Greatest Hits Collection featured his old songs, as well as several new tracks.

=== Collaborations and guest appearances ===
Bogović, together with Elvis J. Kurtović, made a guest appearance in Pips, Chips & Videoclips song "R'n'R zvijezda" ("R'n'R Star"), released on the band's 1995 album Dernjava (Noise). Bogović made a guest appearance in Renato Metessi song "Dva prijatelja" ("Two Friends"), released on Metessi's 2004 album Veliki strašan film (Big Scary Movie). In 2009, he made a guest appearance in Vatrene Ulice song "Usnuli grad se budi" ("The Sleeping City Awakes"), released on the group's album 9 po Rihteru (9 on the Richter Scale). He made a guest appearance on Radio Luksemburg 2011 album U boji (In Color), in the song "Idu dani" ("Days Are Passing"). In 2017, with the band Dosh Lee he recorded the song "Stara pizdo (Voljenom diskografu)" ("You Old Cunt (To the Beloved Record Label)").

== Acting ==
In 1995, Bogović and actor Damir Šaban created the theatre play Gusti salon (Thick Hall), based on the works of Antun Gustav Matoš and performed in Zagreb Youth Theater. Bogović wrote music for the play, acted and sung in it. In 2014, he portrayed a drunken factory worker in one episode of Croatian TV series Black & White World, named after Prljavo Kazalište album and song, and set in the late 1970s and early 1980s Zagreb.

== Other activities ==
In 2008, Bogović participated in the reality show Farma.

== Legacy ==
In 1998, the album Crno bijeli svijet was ranked as the 36th on the list of 100 Greatest Albums of Yugoslav Popular Music in the book YU 100: najbolji albumi jugoslovenske rok i pop muzike (YU 100: The Best Albums of Yugoslav Pop and Rock Music). In 2015, Prljavo Kazalište was polled No.23 and Crno bijeli svijet was polled No.24 on the list of 100 Greatest Yugoslav Albums published by the Croatian edition of Rolling Stone.

In 2000, four Prljavo Kazalište songs appeared on the Rock Express Top 100 Yugoslav Rock Songs of All Times list, two of recorded with Bogović as vocalist, "Mi plešemo" ("We Dance"), polled No.49, and "Crno bijeli svijet", polled No.74. In 2011, "Mi plešemo" was polled No.42 and "Crno bijeli svijet" was polled No.60 on the B92 Top 100 Yugoslav songs list.

== Discography ==
=== With Prljavo Kazalište ===
==== Studio albums ====
- Prljavo Kazalište (1979)
- Crno bijeli svijet (1980)
- Korak od sna (1983)

==== Singles ====
- "Televizori" / "Majka" / "Moje djetinjstvo" (1978)
- 'Moj je otac bio u ratu" / "Noć" (1978)
- "Moderna djevojka" / "Crno bijeli svijet" (1980)

=== Studio albums ===
- Sretno dijete (2008)
- Mijene (2012)

=== Compilation albums ===
- Greatest Hits Collection (2020)

=== With Tihomir Fileš's faction of Prljavo Kazalište ===
==== Studio albums ====
- Underground (2023)
