= Mladen Bodalec =

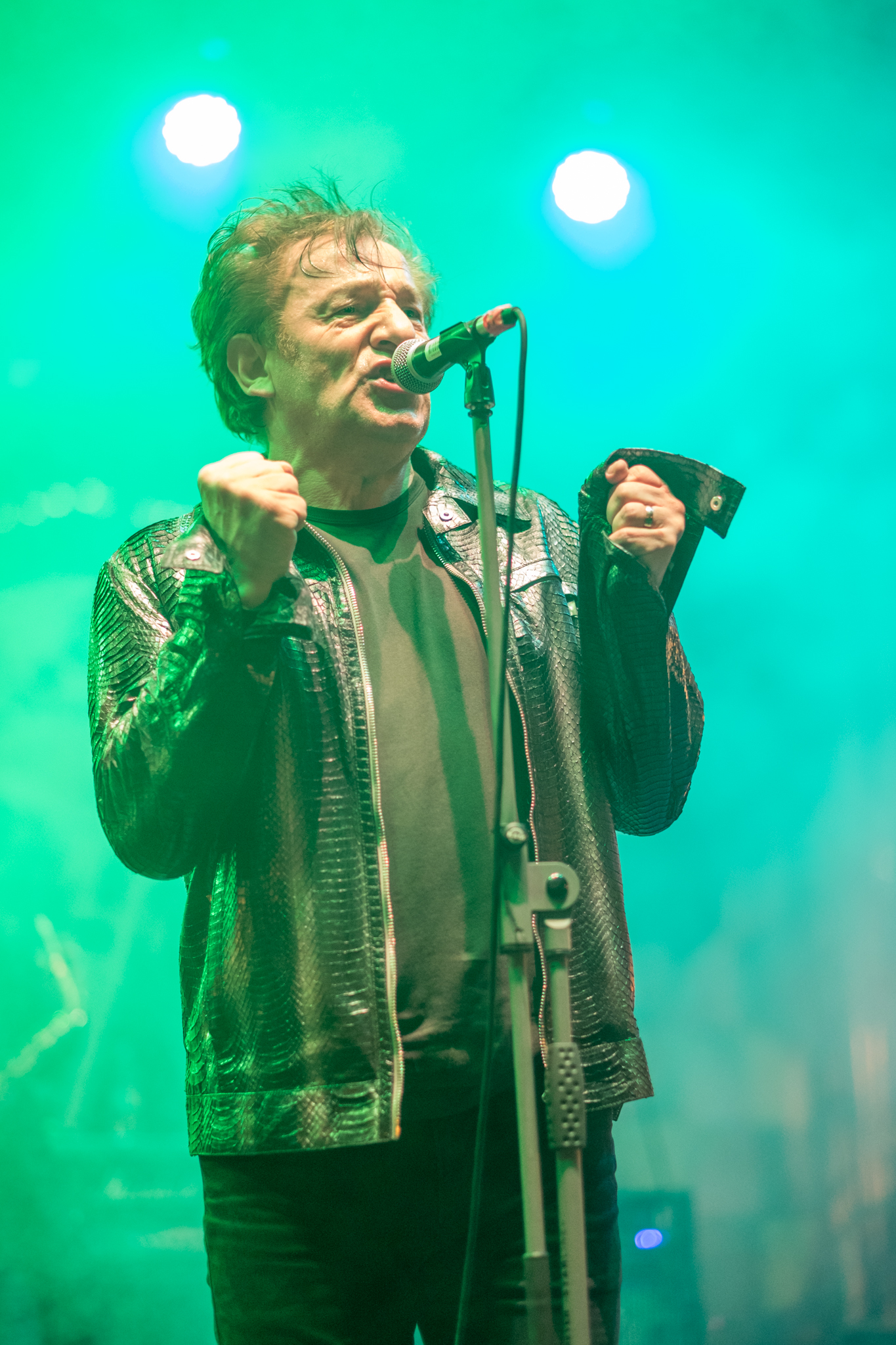
- Bodalec performing with Prljavo Kazalište in 2017

Background information
- Born: 1 January 1959 (age 67); Lobor, PR Croatia, FPR Yugoslavia
- Genres: New wave; rock; pop rock; power pop
- Occupation: Singer
- Instrument: Vocals
- Years active: 1981–present
- Labels: Jugoton, Suzy, Crno Bijeli Svijet Records, InterService, Croatia Records, Dallas Records, Hit Records
- Formerly of: Patrola

Mladen Bodalec (born 1 January 1959) is a Croatian and Yugoslav rock musician, best known as the lead vocalist of the popular band Prljavo Kazalište.

Bodalec started his career as the vocalist for the Zagreb-based new wave band Patrola, coming to the group as the replacement for Renato Metessi. With Patrola, Bodalec recorded a never-released studio album. In 1985, he joined Prljavo Kazalište as the replacement for the band's original vocalist Davorin Bogović, remaining the band's frontman since. With Prljavo Kazalište Bodalec has recorded ten studio albums and seven live albums.

== Musical career ==
=== Patrola ===
Bodalec started his career in 1981, when he joined Zagreb-based new wave band Patrola as the replacement for their original vocalist Renato Metessi. With Bodalec as vocalist, Patrola recorded their second studio album Tragovi noći (Traces of the Night). The album was never released, as upon its completion band's leader Damir Molnar went to serve his mandatory stint in the Yugoslav army, Patrola thus ending its activity.

=== Prljavo Kazalište ===
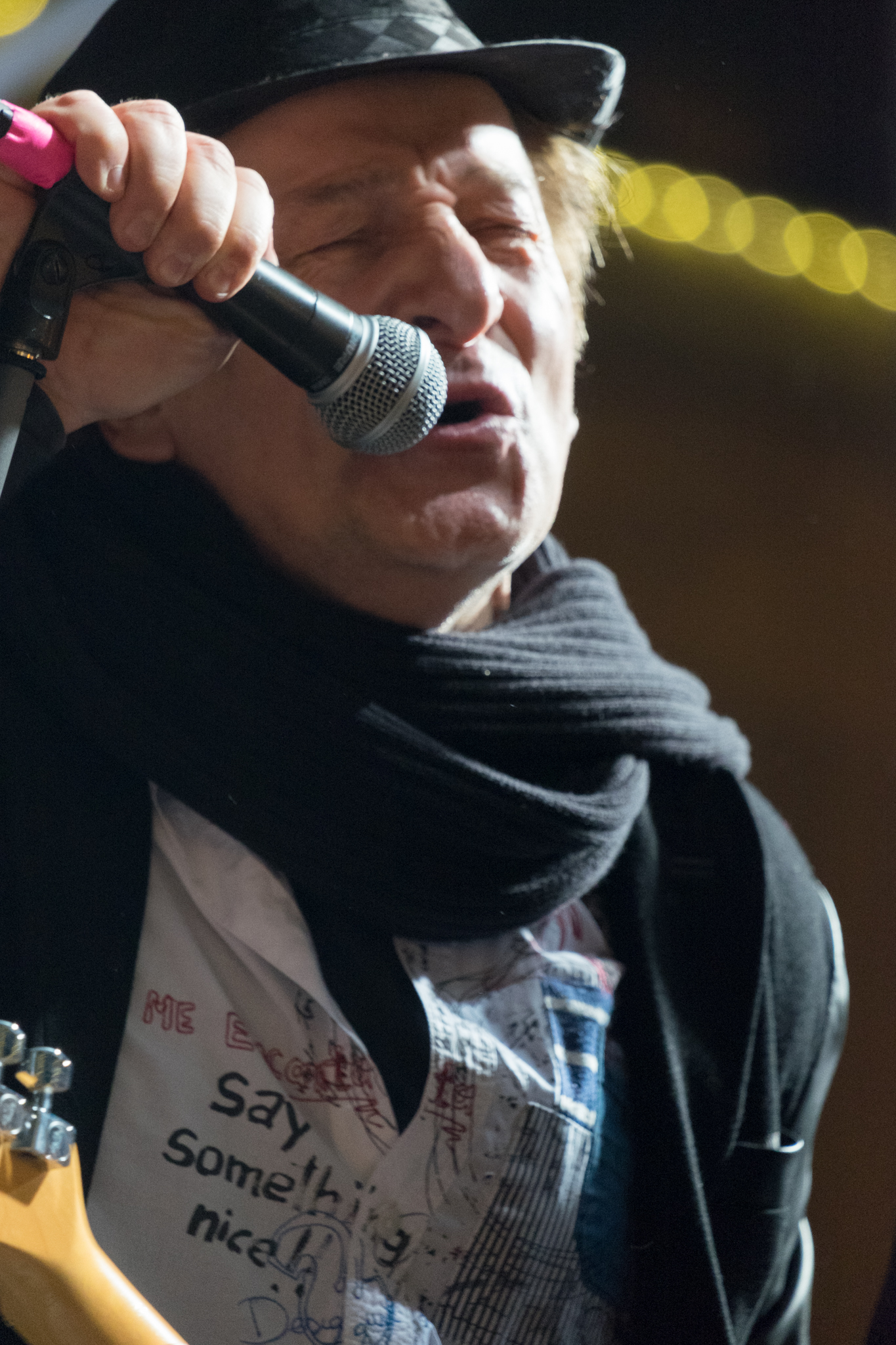
Bodalec performing with Prljavo Kazalište in Samobor in 2017

In 1983, Bodalec appeared as a backing vocalist on the album Korak do sna (One Step Away from the Dream) by popular band Prljavo Kazalište. Two years later, he replaced the band's original frontman Davorin Bogović, debuting as the group's vocalist on the album Zlatne godine (Golden Years). Bodalec has remained the band's vocalist since, recording ten studio albums and seven live albums with the group, to large popularity in Croatia and other former Yugoslav republics.

=== Guest appearances ===
Bodalec made a guest appearance on the 1995 album Baklje Ivanjske (Torches of Saint John's Eve) by Croatian and Yugoslav singer Doris Dragović, singing with her in the title track. He made a guest appearance on the 2013 album 100 metara do sreće (100 Meters to Happiness) by Croatian band Radio Luksemburg, in the song "Ispod kože" ("Under the Skin").

== Legacy ==
In 2000, four Prljavo Kazalište songs appeared on the Rock Express Top 100 Yugoslav Rock Songs of All Times list, two of them featuring Bodalec on vocals: "Ma kog me boga za tebe pitaju" ("Why in the Heaven's Name Are They Asking Me about You") polled No.77 and "Marina" polled No.93.

== Discography ==
=== With Prljavo Kazalište ===
==== Studio albums ====
- Zlatne godine (1985)
- Zaustavite Zemlju (1988)
- Devedeseta (1990)
- Lupi petama... (1993)
- S vremena na vrijeme (1996)
- Dani ponosa i slave (1998)
- Radio Dubrava (2003)
- Moj dom je Hrvatska (2005)
- Tajno ime (2008)
- Možda dogodine (2012)

==== Live albums ====
- Sve je lako kad si mlad – Live (1989)
- Zabranjeni koncert (1994)
- Božićni koncert (1995)
- 20 godina (1997)
- XXX godina (2009)
- XL World Tour Finale Stadion Zagreb (2019)
- 30 godina od koncerta na Trgu - Arena Zagreb (2020)

==== Video albums ====
- Lupi petama (1993)
- Božićni koncert (1995)
- Prljavo Kazalište (1996)
- Prljavo Kazalište na Trgu (2003)
- XXX godina (2009)
- XL World Tour Finale Stadion Zagreb (2019)
- 30 godina od koncerta na Trgu - Arena Zagreb (2020)

==== Singles ====
- "...Mojoj majci" / "Topoteka House Mix" / "Marina" (1989)
- "Dođi sada Gospode" (1996)
- "Tamni slapovi" (2014)
- "Stare navike" (2023)
- "Makni se" (2023)
- "Molim Boga da svane" (2024)
- "Djeca su OK" (2024)

===== Charted singles =====
Title	Year	Peak chart positions	Album
Title	Year	CRO	Album
"Stare navike"	2023	2	Non-album single
"—" denotes releases that did not chart or were not released in that territory.
