= Lupi petama... =

Studio album by Prljavo Kazalište
- Released: 1993
- Genre: Rock
- Length: 34:52
- Label: CBS

Prljavo Kazalište chronology
Devedeseta (1990)	Lupi petama... (1993)	Božićni koncert (1995)

Lupi petama... (stylised Lupi petama,..., meaning "Stomp Your Heels") is an album by the Croatian rock band Prljavo Kazalište. It was released in 1993, and dealt with themes from the ongoing Croatian War of Independence. All songs were written by Jasenko Houra.

The songs Kiše jesenje and Tu noć kad si se udavala remain some of the most well known songs by the band. The song Uzalud vam trud svirači was described by band member Jasenko Houra as a signature song, while Mladen Bodalec placed more emphasis on the longevity of Kiše jesenje.

== Track listing ==
1. "Lupi petama, reci evo sve za Hrvatsku" ("Stomp your heels, say everything for Croatia")
2. "Pet dana ratujem, subotom se zaljubljujem" ("For five days I fight, On Saturday I fall in love")
3. "Kao ja da poludiš" ("To go crazy like me")
4. "Tu noć kad si se udavala" ("That night you got married")
5. "Beznadni slučaj" ("Hopeless case")
6. "Kiše jesenje" ("Autumn rain")
7. "Ptico malena" ("Little bird")
8. "Uzalud vam trud svirači" ("Your effort is useless, musicians")
