= Crno-bijeli svijet =

Studio album by Prljavo Kazalište
- Released: 27 June 1980
- Studio: Elletroformati Studio, Milan
- Genre: 2-tone, Ska punk, New Wave
- Length: 36:10
- Label: Suzy
- Producer: Ivan Piko Stančić

Prljavo Kazalište chronology
Prljavo kazalište (1979)	Crno-bijeli svijet (1980)	Heroj ulice (1981)

Crno-bijeli svijet (Croatian: "Black and White World") is the second album by the Croatian and former Yugoslav rock band Prljavo Kazalište from their new wave period.

== Overview ==
This album was released by the Zagreb based Suzy record label in 1980. The title of the album and the record sleeve holds a reference to the 2 Tone movement and included the ska songs "Crno bijeli svijet" (Black white world) and the hit "Mi plešemo" (We dance). The lyrics "(...)smrt dječaka u Kabulu" (death of a small boy in Kabul) in the reggae themed "Neka te ništa ne brine" refer to the Soviet invasion of Afghanistan in 1979. The song is also included in the soundtrack for the ex-Yugoslav new wave music-related film Dečko koji obećava. The album is an important record from the Yugoslav new wave era. A cover version of the main single Crno bijeli svijet is included in the tribute album Yugoton (ZIC ZAC Music Company and BMG Poland) named after the former Yugoslav record company Jugoton. The album Yugoton features cover versions of popular ex-Yugoslav songs performed by Polish artists.

== Track listing ==
- All songs written by Jasenko Houra, except where noted.
1. Crno bijeli svijet (Black-white world) (3:11)
2. Moderna djevojka (Modern girl) (3:54)
3. Nove cipele (New shoes) (3:29)
4. Nedjeljom ujutro (Sunday morning) (4:22)
5. Neka te ništa ne brine (Don't you let anything worry you) (4:12)
6. Zagreb (3:06)
7. 17 ti je godina tek (You're only seventeen) (3:19) (Lyrics: Schewabach Kurt; Croatian lyrics: Mario Kinel; Music: Doc Pomus, Mort Shuman)
8. Neki moji prijatelji (Some of my friends) (2:57)
9. Sam (Alone) (4:05) (Lyrics: Houra; Music: Ivan Piko Stančić)
10. Mi plešemo (We're dancing) (4:31)

== See also ==
- New wave music in Yugoslavia
- Punk rock in Yugoslavia
- Paket aranžman
- Artistička radna akcija
- Novi Punk Val
- Yugoton
