= Ivana Banfić =

- Also known as: I Bee
- Born: 16 November 1969 (age 56); Zagreb, SR Croatia, SFR Yugoslavia
- Genres: Pop; dance
- Occupations: Dancer; singer
- Years active: 1991–present
- Labels: Suzy; Croatia Records; Menart; Dallas Records; Hayat Production
- Website: ivanabanfic.hr

Ivana Banfić (Croatian pronunciation: [ǐʋana bâːnfitɕ]; born 16 November 1969), formerly known as I Bee, is a Croatian dancer and pop singer. She became famous in the 1990s during the period of popularity of dance music in Croatia.

Banfić was born in Zagreb. She released her first album in 1991. Her songs were remembered for sexually provocative lyrics and elaborate choreography. Her well-known hit was "Šumica", a song about nude swimming.

She also took part in a hugely successful duet with the Bosnian singer Dino Merlin called "Godinama" in 2000, a song which achieved popularity throughout the former Yugoslavia. The song won a Porin Award for Hit of the Year in 2001. She won the Večernjakova ruža award for best female singer in 2004.

== Discography ==
- Vozy me polako (1991)
- Istinite priče Vol 1. (1994)
- Mala škola ABC (1995)
- Bogovi su pali na tjeme (1996)
- Kalypso (1998)
- Žena devedesetih (1999)
- Ona zna (2001)
- Glamour (2003)
- Vjerujem (2006)

Source: Discogs

Awards and achievements
Preceded by Tifa & Makadam	Sunčane Skale winner 2001	Succeeded by Tijana Dapčević
