= Lačni Franz =

Slovenian musical group; rock band

- The original lineup of Lačni Franz in 1984

Background information
- Origin: Maribor, Slovenia
- Genres: New wave; rock; art rock; folk rock; alternative rock
- Years active: 1979–1997; 2000–2001; 2005–2008; 2014–2022
- Labels: Helidon, LF, Conan, KUD Levi Breg, Croatia Records, Sevdex Records, Celinka
- Past members: Zoran Predin; Oto Rimele; Zoran Stjepanovič; Andrej Pintarič; Mirko Kosi; Damjan Likavec; Milan Prislan; Nino Mureškič; Boštjan Velkavrh; Tine Čas; Anej Kočevar; Luka Čadež; Boštjan Artiček

Lačni Franz (trans. Hungry Franz) was a Slovenian and Yugoslav rock band formed in Maribor in 1979. The band is widely considered one of the most prominent acts of the Yugoslav new wave scene, as well as one of the most prominent acts of the Yugoslav rock scene in general.

The band was formed by vocalist Zoran Predin, guitarist Oto Rimele, bass guitarist Zoran Stjepanovič, drummer Andrej Pinterič and keyboardist Mirko Kosi. With their 1981 debut album Ikebana the band joined in on the exuberant Yugoslav new wave scene, marking the direction of their future releases with Predin's metaphorical lyrics filled with irony and dark humor, with topics ranging from love over social issues to political satire. The band's early releases gained large attention of the Yugoslav audience and media, despite complex sound and Slovene language lyrics. Their third studio album, Ne mi dihat za ovratnik, released in 1983, was the band's first major mainstream success. After the release of the commercially highly successful album Na svoji strani in 1986, Rimele left the group and was replaced by Milan Prislan. The new lineup moved towards mainstream rock sound with their late 1980s releases. Following the release of the album Tiha voda in 1989, the group went on a long hiatus, during which the members dedicated themselves to other activities. In 1994, the group released the farewell album Zadnja večerja. They officially disbanded in 1997, Predin continuing his career as a successful singer-songwriter.

In 2000, Stjepanovič, Pinterič, Kosi and Prislan briefly reunited and recorded the album V peni sprememb with vocalist Boštjan Velkavrh. In 2005, the band reunited with Predin, holding a series of concerts across former Yugoslavia. In 2014, Predin reformed Lačni Franz with a group of younger musicians. The new incarnation of the group recorded three studio albums (two of them featuring Lačni Franz's old songs in acoustic arrangements and with new, Croatian language lyrics) and a live album, before holding a series of farewell concerts in 2022.

== History ==
=== Formation and first releases (1979–1982) ===
Before the forming of Lačni Franz, the band's frontman Zoran Predin had little on-stage experience. As a high school student, he wrote poetry, and was persuaded by the members of the Maribor band Rdeči Dečki (Red Boys) to write lyrics for their songs. However, as he was satisfied with the written lyrics, he opted not to give them to Rdeči Dečki, but to try and compose music on them. In June 1979, on Predin's birthday party on Pohorje, he was heard singing by Oto Rimele, who was at the time the guitarist in the band Zevs (Zeus). As Zevs lacked a vocalist, Rimele invited Predin to the band's rehearsal. On the informal audition, Predin was asked to sing the standards "Feelings" and "Yesterday" that they performed, but his vocals did not fit well into the band's repertoire. Instead, he offered them his songs, and the band gradually started working on the new repertoire, consisting exclusively of their own material.

Officially formed in June 1979, the band's first lineup featured Zoran Predin (vocals), Oto Rimele (guitar), Zoran Stjepanovič (bass guitar), Andrej Pinterič (drums) and Mirko Kosi (keyboards). At the time of the band formation, all the members of the band, with the exception of Predin, were in their teens or their twenties, with Rimele being only 16. Predin was the only one who was married and had a child, and prior to the band formation had taken numerous jobs to support his family: he worked as a postman, a night guard, an insurance company agent, a records salesman and a secretary in Maribor's Youth Cultural Center. At the time of the band formation, he worked as a superintendent in the building in which he lived. On the idea of Predin, the band was named Lačni Franz (Hungry Franz), the name being directly inspired by the character Hungry Joe from Joseph Heller's novel Catch-22. The adjective lačni, in the words of the members, signified their hunger for rock in the era of disco, and the name Franc was chosen as a common name in the Štajerska region. The band changed the last letter of the name from c to z out of, as they explained themselves, zezanje (slang expression from South Slavic languages, trans. screwing around).

Due to uncommunicative sound and the fact that their lyrics were in Slovene language (whereas the predominant language in Yugoslavia was Serbo-Croatian), the band initially had difficulties in reaching a broader audience, so Predin introduced long monologues into the band's live performances, translating his lyrics into Serbo-Croatian and telling anecdotes. These monologues led to Predin being dubbed the "Yugoslav Lenny Bruce" by a part of the Yugoslav music press. The band had their first large success with their appearance on the 1981 Subotica Youth Festival, winning the Best Interpretation Award. The recording of their performance of the song "Šankrok" ("Bar Rock") from the festival would appear 42 years later on the compilation album 60 godina festival Omladina (60 Years of the Youth Festival).

Soon after their performance at the festival, they released their debut album, entitled Ikebana. The album was produced by Boris Bele of the band Buldožer and recorded in only 36 hours. As Pintarič was at the time of the album recording serving his mandatory stint in the Yugoslav People's Army, the drums on the recording were played by Damjan Likavec. The record was marked by the band's specific style, with complex compositions and Predin's metaphorical lyrics filled with dark humor. It brought well-received songs "Praslovan" ("Early Slav"), "Stari vojak" ("Old Soldier"), "Šankrok", "Bitles" ("Beatles") and "Bog nima telefona" ("God Doesn't Have a Phone"). "Praslovan" and "Stari vojak" featured Stjepanovič playing the accordion, and he sang lead vocals in the song "Ja sam sam" ("I Am Alone") written by him. "Stari vojak" was the first song ever composed by Predin, while he was still in high school. For the song lyrics, he used the poem from the ending of James Jones' novel From Here to Eternity. On the insistence of the band's record label, Helidon, Predin was forced to alter the "Praslovan" verse "Zajebali vse kar se je zajebat dalo" ("Fucked up everything which could be fucked up"), and to use the word zabelili (spiced up) instead of the word zajebali. On the band's concerts, he performed the song with original lyrics.

At the end of 1981, the band recorded their second studio album, Adijo pamet (Goodbye Mind). As on its predecessor, the drums where played by Likavec. The album was stylistically similar to their debut, bringing well-received tracks "Vaterpolist" ("Water Polo Player"), "Lent 1980." (named after Lent, the impoverished area of Maribor inhabited predominately by Romanis), and "Miss Evrope" ("Miss Europe"). After the album recording, the group went on a hiatus, as a part of members was drafted to serve their mandatory army stints. The album was released at the beginning of 1982, but was not promoted on live performances. Nevertheless, the band's debut led to Lačni Franz being polled in the annual poll organized by the music magazine Džuboks as the second on the list of the Bands of the Year 1981 (sharing the place with Riblja Čorba), Predin was polled the Composer of the Year and the Singer of the Year, and Rimele was polled the second on the list of the Best Guitarists of the Year. At the same time, they were awarded the Seven Secretaries of SKOJ Award by the League of Socialist Youth of Yugoslavia.

=== Mainstream success (1983–1989) ===
The band resumed their activities in 1983, with the release of their third studio album Ne mi dihat za ovratnik (Don't Breathe Down My Neck). The album featured less complex, more communicative sound, bringing blues–oriented tracks "Prosim, pazi da mi ne pohodiš podočnjakov" ("Please, Be Careful Not to Step on the Bags Under My Eyes"), "Prvi maj" ("May 1") and the elegiac "Lipa zelenela je" ("The Linden Tree Turned Green"), as well as the band's first major hit, the title track. Following the album release, Predin acted in Karpo Godina's film Red Boogie. On their December 1983 concerts in Maribor and Ljubljana, the band recorded the live album Slišiš, školjka poje ti (Listen, the Shell Sings to You). Beside the songs released on their studio albums, the album featured a new song, humorous folk-oriented tune "Naša Lidija je pri vojakih" ("Our Lidija Is With the Soldier"), inspired by the appearance of first female soldiers in Yugoslav People's Army. On the album, as the authors of the song the band signed Top Zizi (a pun inspired by the name of the American rock band ZZ Top); at the time, the band would often disguise themselves and perform as their own opening act under this name. "Naša Lidija je pri vojakih" gained large popularity in SR Slovenia, and the band, until then maintaining large fanbase in Belgrade, Zagreb and Sarajevo only, started performing across their home republic. The band's work was especially well received in Sarajevo, enjoying popularity among the fans of the New Primitivist bands Zabranjeno Pušenje and Elvis J. Kurtović & His Meteors. In 1984, Predin attended listening sessions with the Sarajevo-based band Kongres, where he was shown two finished songs from their album Zarjavele trobente (Rusty Trumpets), "Zabava" ("Entertainment") and the title track. He later recalled the track and covered it in his album Tu smo - vasi smo!

In 1984, the band released their fourth studio album, Slon med porcelanom (Elephant in a China Shop). The song "Jutri bom pujsa razbil" ("Tomorrow I Will Break the Pig") featured the refrain from "Zarjavele trobente". The album brought the crisis within the band; Predin, Rimele and Stjepanovič authored different songs on the album, and the dilemma about the future direction of the band arose. Rimele decided to record one more album with Lačni Franz and to leave the group after its release.

In 1985, the band took part in the YU Rock Misija project, a Yugoslav contribution to Live Aid, Predin contributing vocals to the charity song "Za Milion Godina", and the band performing at the corresponding charity concert held at the Red Star Stadium in Belgrade. The last album recorded by the original lineup, Na svoji strani (On Our Own Side), was produced by the band themselves and released in 1986, turned out to be the band's biggest commercial success up to that point. Stylistically diverse, featuring a brass section in some of the songs, the album brought the hits "Naj ti poljub nariše usnice" ("May a Kiss Paint Your Lips"), "Ko si rdeče zvezde šivala" ("When You Sewed Red Stars"), "Čuvstveno stanje mlade krave" ("The Emotional State of a Young Cow") and "Na svoji strani". During the promotional tour, the band performed in Belgrade's Student's Cultural Center and were joined on stage by Riblja Čorba frontman Bora Đorđević, who played harmonica in the song "Nasvidenje na plaži" ("Goodbye on the Beach"). At the time, Predin was invited by the Zagreb band Animatori to make a guest appearance on their album Dok ležim cijeli dan u sjeni (While I'm Lying in the Shade All Day). Predin wrote the Slovene language lyrics for the track "Bijeg" ("Escape") and sang the song with Animatori frontman Krešimir Blažević. After the promotional tour for Na svoji strani, Rimele left the band, joining Laibach and dedicating himself to painting. In the following decades he would hold a number of solo exhibitions, release two solo albums—Oto Rimele, pjesme (Oto Rimele, The Songs, 1998) and Waving (2021)—and become a professor at the Maribor Faculty of Education.

After the departure of Rimele, Lačni Franz's new guitarist became Milan Prislan, previously a member of the little-known Maribor band Grif. The new lineup recorded the album Sirene tulijo (Sirens Are Wailing), released in 1987, which marked their shift towards mainstream rock sound. On the album, Prislan debuted as a composer. The album's main hit was the song "Zdravljica" ("A Toast"), a cover of Slovenian traditional song on the lyrics of 19th-century Romantic poet France Prešeren. The song featured guest appearances on vocals by Pankrti frontman Pero Lovšin, Martin Krpan frontman Vlado Kreslin, singer-songwriter Jani Kovačič and actor Boris Cavazza. Due to the informal nature of the version, it sparked controversy in Slovenia and was marked as unsuitable for broadcasting by a number of Slovenian media. Other hits from the album included the ballad "Čakaj me" ("Wait for Me") and the humorous song "Mravljinčarji in čeladarji" ("Anteaters and Helmeters"), the latter with lyrics about characteristic of circumcisied and uncircumcised penises.

At the beginning of 1989, Predin recorded the album Svjedoci priče (Witnesses to the Story) with renowned singer-songwriter Arsen Dedić, featuring new versions of Predin's and Dedić's songs. Their key collaborator on the album was Mirko Vuksanović, keyboardist of the band Avtomobili. For the album, Dedić recorded the Serbo-Croatian version of "Čakaj me" (entitled "Čekaj me"), and in the song "Domovina" Dedić and Predin sang with Bora Đorđević. After the album release, Dedić, Predin and Đorđević together held a number of poetic-musical evenings. In September 1989, Lačni Franz performed at the international EBU Rock Festival in Novi Sad, where they represented Yugoslavia together with Bajaga i Instruktori and Ekatarina Velika. At the end of the Year, they released the album Tiha voda (Silent Water), recorded with a new member, percussionist Nino Mureškić. Half of the songs on the album were composed by Prislan. The album featured a guest appearance by Vlado Kreslin on harmonica, and the album inner sleeve featured the songs lyrics translated into Serbo-Croatian, which was done by Arsen Dedić. The album was marked by the songs "Tiha voda (Vzami si čas)" ("Silent Water (Take a Moment)"), "Tam bi rad bio pokopan" ("I Would Gladly Be Buried There"), "Gremo v nebesa" ("We're Going to Heaven") and "Mirno morje Miki Maus" ("Calm Sea Mickey Mouse").

=== Long hiatus, Zadnja večerja and disbandment (1989–1997) ===
Following the release of Tiha voda, Lačni Franz members dedicated themselves to other activities. For several years, the band did not perform or record new material, releasing only the compilation albums Kaj bi mi brez nas (What Would We Do Without Us, 1989) and Ilegalni pubertetniki (Illegal Adolescents, 1991). Predin dedicated himself to composing music for film, TV series and theatre, releasing part of this material in 1992 on his first solo album Gate na glavu (Gate on the Head). He recorded the album with the band Los Malancanos, gathered for the album recording sessions.

After much deliberation, the members of the band decided to record their farewell album. The album carried the symbolic title Zadnja večerja (The Last Supper), and was recorded without Mureškić, who had left the band in the meantime. (Mureškić would continue his career as the leader of the drum band Afir Bafir and in 2002 he would release the solo album Manas.) The backing vocals were recorded by Cole Moreti and Robert Pešut "Magnifico". The title track used the melody of the "State Anthem of the Soviet Union". The album brought a number of poetic songs, like "Ambasadorji užitka" ("Ambassadors of Pleasure"), "Vetar iz Kazablanke" ("Wind from Casablanca"), as well as political songs "Vedno iste face" ("Always the Same Faces") and "Zanzibar". The song "Azra" was dedicated to the city of Sarajevo. Following the album release, in November 1994, they held three concerts in Maribor, the recordings from which appeared on the double live album and the VHS Lačni Franz v živo (Lačni Franz Live), released through the band's own record label LF.

The last notable performances by the band were two concerts held in the hall of Sarajevo Academy of Performing Arts in April 1996, four months after the end of Bosnian War. As all the members with the exception of Predin had obtained employments in various fields, working with the band occasionally only, they agreed to end their activity, and Lačni Franz officially disbanded on 31 December 1997. After the disbandment, Predin continued his career as a solo artist, achieving large popularity as singer-songwriter.

=== Reunion without Predin (2000) ===
In 2000, Prislan, Stjepanovič, Pintarič and Kosi reunited and recorded the album V peni sprememb (In the Midst of Change) with vocalist Boštjan Velkavrh. Simultaneously, all Lačni Franz studio albums were released on the nine-piece box set Kaj bi mi brez nas.

=== Reunion with Predin (2005–2008) ===
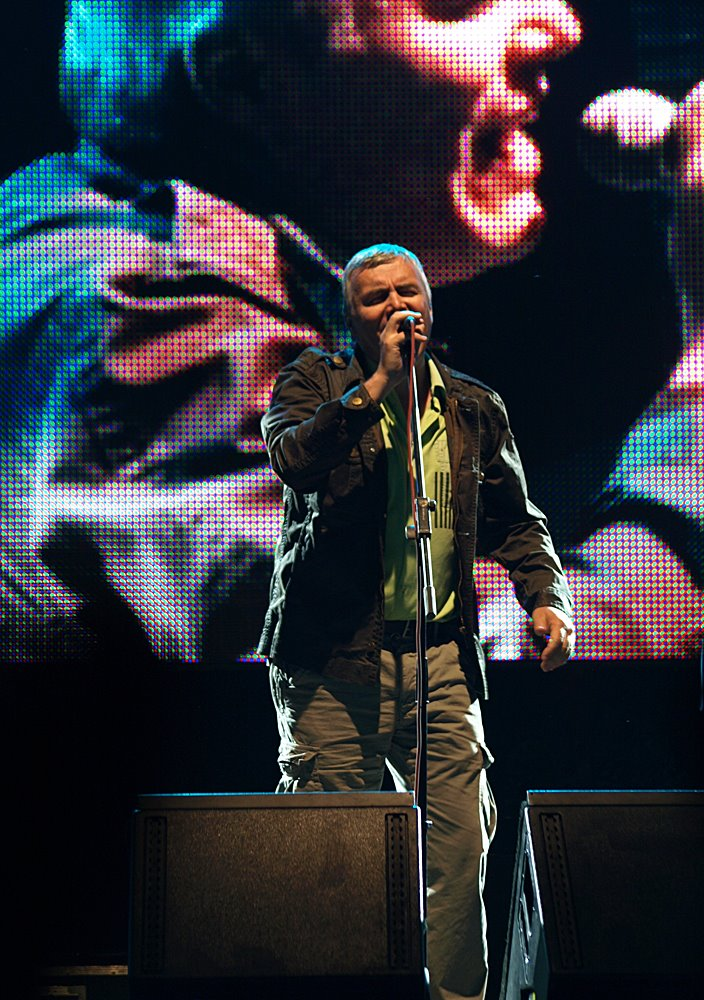
Zoran Predin in 2008

In 2004, the compilation album Starši vaših radosti (Parents of Your Joys) was released, featuring a CD with the band's hits, as well as a DVD with the recordings from the band's concerts held on November 24, 25 and 26, 1994 in the Maribor's Štuk hall. Following the compilation release, in 2005, Predin, Prislan, Stjepanovič, Pintarič and Kosi reunited, holding a reunion concert at Križanke Outdoor Theatre in Ljubljana. The concert was followed by a series of concerts across former Yugoslavia. The band took part in the tribute concert for Animatori frontman Krešo Blažević, held in Zagreb club Tvornica on 20 June 2007. On the concert, Predin and Animatori performed "Bijeg" (originally recorded by Predin and Animatori in 1987). The recordings from the concert, including Lačni Franz's "Ne mi dihat za ovratnik", were released on the 2007 live album Ostat će mlad (He'll Stay Young). Lačni Franz also took part on the concert held in Tvornica on 2 October 2008 in order to mark the 30th anniversary of the birth of the Yugoslav new wave scene. The recording of their performance appeared on the double live album Sedmorica veličanstvenih (The Magnificent Seven), alongside the recordings of performances by Električni Orgazam, Darko Rundek, Vlada Divljan i Nevladina Organizacija, Jasenko Houra and Davorin Bogović, and Peter Lovšin i Španski Borci.

=== Reformation and disbandment (2014–2022) ===
In 2014, Predin reformed Lačni Franz with a group of younger musicians: Tine Čas (guitar), Anej Kočevar (bass guitar), Luka Čadež (drums) and Boštjan Artiček (keyboards). The new lineup recorded the 2016 album Lađa norcev (Ship of Fools), featuring Predin's new songs, as well as old Lačni Franz songs with new lyrics corresponding with current social and political situation – "Spet na svoji strani" ("On Our Own Side Again"), "Jebiveter Junior" ("Jerk Junior"), "Legendarni Praslovan" ("Legendary Early Slav") and "Naš novi bog" ("Our New God"). The band released the same songs with Croatian language lyrics on the album entitled Svako dobro (All the Best). During the same year, the band took part in the KUD Idijoti tribute album Za tebe (For You) with a cover of KUD Idijoti song "Ja sjećam se" ("I Remember").

The album Akustična pusa (Acoustic Kiss), released in 2017, featured the band's old sons in acoustic arrangements and with new, Croatian language lyrics; "Zadnja večerja" was re-recorded as "Da sreli se nismo" ("If We Haven't Met"), "Čuvstveno stanje mlade krave" as "Moj imidž i ja" ("My Image and Me"), "Tiha voda (Vzami si čas)" as "Koji s vjetrom pjevaju" ("The Ones Who Sing With the Wind"). Akustična pusa was followed by Nova nebesa (New Heaven), also released in 2017 and also featuring acoustic versions of the band's old songs with Croatian language lyrics.

In 2020, the band released the double live album Tu smo – vaši smo! (We're Here – We're Yours!), recorded on their concert held on 29 November 2019 in Štuk hall in Maribor. The band split up at the end of 2022, after a series of farewell concerts.

The band's original drummer Andrej Pintarič died on 23 January 2022.

== Legacy ==
Slovenian band Rock Partyzani covered Lačni Franz songs "Praslovan", "Ne mi dihat za ovratnik" and "Tisoč modrobelih rožic" ("A Thousand Blue-White Roses") on their 2007 album Dan zmage! (Victory Day!). Serbian blues rock band Texas Flood covered the song "Čekaj me" on their 2019 album Tražim ljude kao ja (I'm Looking for the People Like Me).

In 1998, Na svoji strani was polled No. 72 and Adijo pamet was polled No. 81 on the list of 100 Greatest Albums of Yugoslav Popular Music in the book YU 100: najbolji albumi jugoslovenske rok i pop muzike (YU 100: The Best albums of Yugoslav pop and rock music). In 2015, Ne mi dihat za ovratnik was polled No. 39 on the list of 100 Greatest Yugoslav Albums published by the Croatian edition of Rolling Stone. In 1987, in YU legende uživo (YU Legends Live), a special publication by Rock magazine, Slišiš, školjka poje ti was proclaimed one of 12 best Yugoslav live albums.

In 2006, "Ne mi dihat za ovratnik" was polled No. 64 and "Praslovan" was polled No. 75 on the B92 Top 100 Domestic Songs list.

The lyrics of 13 songs by the band, all authored by Predin, were featured in Petar Janjatović's book Pesme bratstva, detinjstva & potomstva: Antologija ex YU rok poezije 1967 - 2007 (Songs of Brotherhood, Childhood & Offspring: Anthology of Ex YU Rock Poetry 1967 – 2007).

== Members ==
=== Current Members ===
- Zoran Predin – vocals (1979–1997, 2005–2008, 2014–2022)
- Oto Rimele – guitar (1979–1985)
- Milan Prislan – guitar (1985–1997, 2000–2001, 2005–2008)
- Zoran Stjepanovič – bass guitar (1979–1997, 2000–2001, 2005–2008)
- Mirko Kosi – keyboards (1979–1997, 2000–2001, 2005–2008)
- Andrej Pintarič – drums (1979–1997, 1982–1997, 2000–2001, 2005–2008)
- Damjan Likavec – drums (1981)
- Nino Mureškič – percussion (1989)
- Tine Čas – guitar (2014–2022)
- Anej Kočevar – bass guitar (2014–2022)
- Luka Čadež – drums (2014–2022)
- Boštjan Artiček – keyboards (2014–2022)

== Discography ==
=== Studio ===
- Ikebana (1981)
- Adijo pamet (1982)
- Ne mi dihat za ovratnik (1983)
- Slon med porcelanom (1984)
- Na svoji strani (1986)
- Sirene tulijo (1987)
- Tiha voda (1989)
- Zadnja večerja (1994)
- V peni sprememb (2000)
- Lađa norcev (2016)
- Akustična pusa (2017)
- Nova nebesa (2017)

=== Live albums ===
- Slišiš, školjka poje ti (1983)
- Lačni Franz v živo (1994)
- Tu smo – vaši smo! (2020)

=== Compilation albums ===
- Kaj bi mi brez nas (1989)
- Ilegalni pubertetniki (1991)
- Nasvidenje na plaži (1995)
- Starši vaših radosti (2004)
- The Ultimate Collection (2011)

=== Box sets ===
- Kaj bi mi brez nas (2001)

=== Video albums ===
- Lačni Franz v živo (1994)
