= Drugi Način =

Croatian rock band

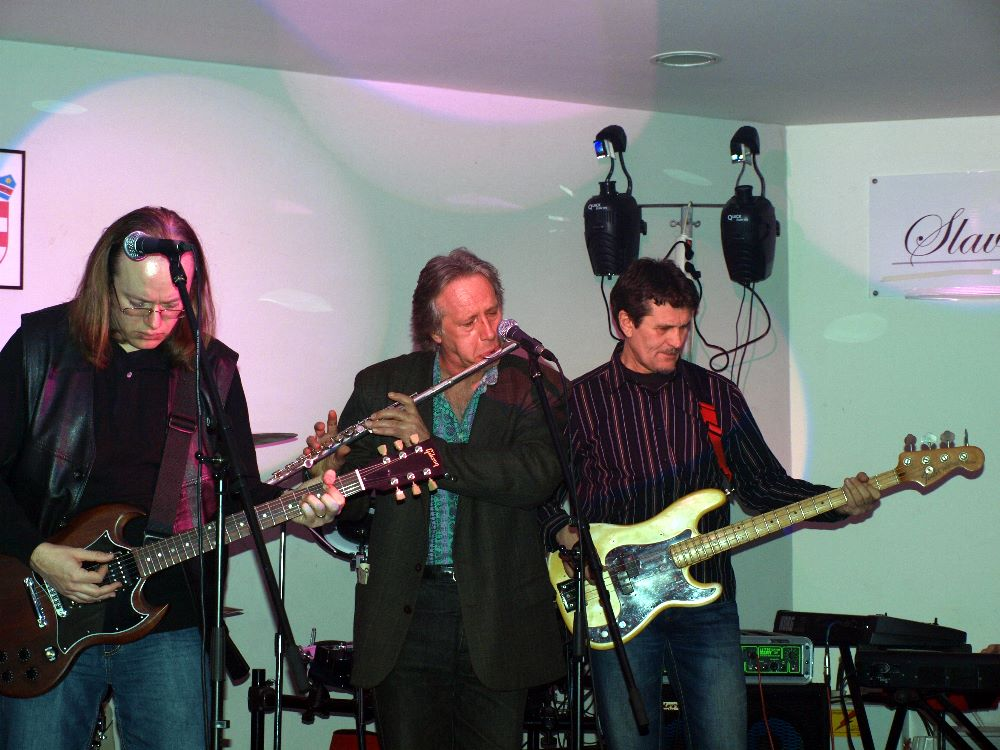
- Drugi Način performing in Slavonski Brod in 2009

Background information
- Origin: Zagreb, Croatia
- Genres: Progressive rock; hard rock; rock
- Years active: 1974–present
- Labels: PGP-RTB, Suzy, Croatia Records
- Members: Branko Požgajec; Božo Ilić; Ernest Vinković; Mario Domazet; Damir Vuk; Mladen Palenkaš
- Past members: Halil Mekić; Željko Mikulčić; Ismet Kurtović; Boris Turina; Branko Bogunović; Nikola Gečević; Robert Krkač; Miroslav Budanko Ajzić; Danijel Veličan; Davor Senčar; Mario Mauer; Dražen Kovač; Branko Bardun; Darko Hajsek

Drugi Način (trans. The Other Way) is a Croatian and Yugoslav rock band formed in Zagreb in 1974.

The band was formed by Branko Požgajec (vocals, keyboard, flute), Halil Mekić (guitar), Željko Mikulčić (bass guitar), Ismet Kurtović (guitar, flute, vocals), and Boris Turina (drums). In 1975, the band released their self-titled debut, a progressive/hard rock concept album dealing with the theme of solitude, to critical acclaim and nationwide popularity. However, despite large success of their debut, in the following years the band did not manage to maintain a steady lineup and did not record a new album until 1982. The band's second studio album, Ponovo na putu, did not repeat the success of their debut. During the following years, the band toured extensively, but towards the end of the decade they started performing occasionally only and, despite never announcing their disbandment, gradually retired from the scene. During the 1990s and the 2000s, the band made only occasional live and discographyc appearances, including the 1992 compilation album Drugi Način, featuring new versions of the band's old songs. The band made a full-scale comeback with their third studio album Zgubidan, released in 2016. Throughout the band's career and lineup changes, Požgajec has been the only mainstay member of the group.

== History ==
=== 1974–1976: Formation, debut album release and mainstream popularity ===
The band's origins can be tracked to the band Novi Akordi (The New Chords), active in the first half of the 1970s, consisting of Branko Požgajec (vocals, keyboards, flute), Halil Mekić (guitar), Željko Mikulčić (bass guitar) and Adonis Dokuzović (drums). When Mekić left the band to serve his mandatory stint in the Yugoslav army, they were joined by Ismet Kurtović (guitar, flute, vocals), who remained a member of Novi Akordi even after Mekić returned from the army and rejoined the band. In 1972, the band released their first record, a 7-inch single featuring the songs "Jedan pogled" ("One Look") and "Još te volim" ("I Still Love You") through Diskos record label. During the following year, they released the 7-inch single with the songs "Opet..." ("Again...") and "Odlazak" ("The Leave") through Jugoton. In July 1974, Dokuzović was replaced by Boris Turina, who decided to leave a career of a table tennis player and dedicate himself to music. Turina had previously played drums in Crveni Koralji, Mladi and one incarnation of the band Zlatni Akordi, and wrote lyrics for several hit songs by Crveni Koralji. In the autumn of 1974, the members of the band decided to change the group's name to Drugi Način, after a poem by Federico García Lorca. The band started officially working under the new name on 12 October 1974. The band's well-known logo, featuring an eye with two irises, was designed by renowned comic book artist Igor Kordej.

The band regularly performed at the music club Big Ben in Zagreb, and at the end of 1974 they recorded their debut album, financing the recording sessions themselves. The songs were composed by Kurtović and Požgajec, and Turina wrote most of the lyrics and created the record's concept. They offered the material to Jugoton, but the label was not interested in signing the band. They signed a contract with another Zagreb-based record label, Suzy, but the contract was broke due to disagreements the band and the label had concerning the album cover design. Finally, the band signed for Belgrade-based PGP-RTB, as one of the editors liked the album artwork and offered Drugi Način a contract without even listening to the recorded material.

The band's self-titled debut was released in 1975. A concept album, featuring songs dealing with solitude, with its Wishbone Ash-, Deep Purple- and Free-influenced sound, recorded in a lineup featuring two guitars and two flutes and released in a luxurious album cover, Drugi Način immediately gained the attention of the public and the music press. The album saw large commercial success and would be reprinted by PGP-RTB for a number of years. The album's biggest hit were the ballads "Stari grad" ("Old City"), which opens with a recitation by Turina, and "Lile su kiše" ("The Rain Was Pouring"), both featuring lyrics written by lyricist Gojko Bjelac.

Simultaneously with his work with Drugi Način, Kurtović formed the acoustic folk rock group Prošlo Vrijeme (Past Time) with Đurđa Kavež (vocals) and Borislav Ostojić (guitar). The group recorded two 7-inch singles, the first in 1975, featuring the songs "Makedo" and "Ne reci" ("Don't Say"), and the second in 1976, featuring the cover of traditional song "Jovano Jovanke" and the song "Negdje" ("Somewhere"), both singles featuring guest appearances by other members of Drugi Način.

=== 1976–1977: Hiatus, formation of Nepočin ===
At the end of 1976, Požgajec left the band to serve his mandatory army stint and the group went on hiatus. During the hiatus, Kurtović and Mekić decided to form their own band. With Božo Ilić (bass guitar), Branko Knežević (drums), and Damir Šebetić (keyboards), they formed the band Nepočin (No-rest). The band chose the name after a book of poems Nepočin polje (No-rest Field) by Yugoslav poet Vasko Popa. Kurtović was influenced by Popa's work since his mandatory army stint in Zaječar, during which he acted in the play Pa ti ne umeš da se voliš (You Don't Know How to Be Loved), written by Popa and directed by Petar Zec in the Pozorište dvorište (Theatre Yard). On 7 January 1977, the newly-formed band performed on a rock festival held in Zemun's Pinki Hall under the name Drugi Način 2, and their versions of Drugi Način songs "Carstvo samoće" ("Empire of Solitude") and "Novi dan" ("New Day") appeared on the various artists double live album Pop parada I (Pop Parade I, 1977) recorded on the festival. Nepočin's debut and only album Svet po kojem gazim (The World I'm Walking On) was released through PGP-RTB in 1978, featuring cover designed by Igor Kordej. The album saw little success upon its release, the Yugoslav music press criticizing the overly flamboyant music and the quality of the lyrics, and the group soon ended its activity.

=== 1976–late 1980s: Reformation, Ponovo na putu, decline in popularity ===
After Požgajec returned from the army, Drugi Način continued their activity with new guitarists, Branko Bogunović and Nikola Gečević, the latter formerly of the band Stakleno Zvono (Bell Jar). The new lineup released the single "Prođe ovaj dan" ("The Day Passed"), written and originally recorded under the title "Hej, hej" ("Hey, hey") in 1969 by Dženan Salković. The new lineup had numerous live appearances across Yugoslavia, however Turina, Bogunović and Gečević left the band, Bogunović forming the jazz rock band Obećanje Proljeća (Promise of the Spring) and Gečević forming the hard rock band Žuta Minuta and eventually the hard rock band Regata. The new members of the band became guitarist Robert Krkač and drummer Miroslav Budanko Ajzić, Ismet Kurtović rejoining the band and bringing along former Nepočin bass guitarist Božo Ilić. When Krkač moved to newly-formed Film, Drugi Način's new guitarist became Danijel Veličan.

In 1982, the band released their second studio album, Ponovo na putu, featuring softer, more mainstream-oriented sound than their debut release. Part of the album lyrics were written by Ismet Kurtović's brother Fikret. Despite bringing the minor hit "Piši mi" ("Write to Me"), the album did not repeat the success of the band's debut. Following the album release, the band toured extensively, holding up to 150 concerts a year, often performing covers of foreign rock hits on their concerts. In 1988, they were joined by new guitarist, Davor Senčar, formerly of the heavy metal band Legija. Not fitting in with the new musical trends, the group gradually retired from the scene, reuniting for live performances occasionally only.

=== Early 1990s–2016: Occasional discograhyc and live appearances ===
In 1991, Drugi Način reunited to record the song "Mir za Hrvatsku" ("Peace for Croatia") for the various artists album Rock za Hrvatsku No.2 (Rock for Croatia No.2). In 1992, Branko Požgajec, Božo Ilić, Davor Senčar, keyboardist Mario Mauer, and drummer Dražen Kovač (a former Regata member) re-recorded some of the old Drugi Način songs and released them alongside two new songs, "Jer postoji ona" ("Because She Exists") and the instrumental track "A'la vild", on the compilation album Drugi Način. Soon, the group was joined by keyboardist Branko Bardun, who was eventually replaced by Darko Hajsek. In 1998, the band appeared at the Neum Festival with the song "Seoska devojka" ("Village Girl"). In 1999, Taped Pictures record label reissued Drugi Način's debut album and Nepočin's only album on one CD entitled Drugi Način + Nepočin. In May 2000, Drugi Način performed as the opening band on the Jethro Tull concert in Zagreb. Davor Senčar died on 21 October 2011.

=== Full-scale comeback (2016-present) ===
The band made a full-scale comeback with the release of their third studio album Zgudiban (Idler) in 2016. The album was recorded in the lineup featuring Branko Požgajec, Božo Ilić, guitarists Ernest Vinković and Mario Domazet, keyboardist Damir Vuk (formerly of Animatori and Pips, Chips & Videoclips) and drummer Mladen Palenkaš. Alongside new material, the album featured a live version of "Prođe ovaj dan", a cover of Focus song "House of the King" and a cover of Drago Mlinarec song "Trebao sam ali nisam" ("I Should Have, But I Didn't").

The band's former drummer Miroslav Budanko Ajzić died on 9 June 2020. In 2022, the band's debut album was re-released on vinyl by the record label Scardona.

== Legacy ==
The album Drugi Način was polled in 1998 as 88th on the list of 100 Greatest Yugoslav Popular Music Albums in the book YU 100: najbolji albumi jugoslovenske rok i pop muzike (YU 100: The Best albums of Yugoslav pop and rock music).

In 2011, the band's song "Stari grad" ("Old Town") was polled, by the listeners of Radio 202, one of 60 greatest songs released by PGP-RTB/PGP-RTS during the 60 years of the label's existence.

The lyrics of the songs "Na mom dlanu" ("On the Palm of My Hand") and "Lile su kiše" are featured in Petar Janjatović's book Pesme bratstva, detinjstva & potomstva: Antologija ex YU rok poezije 1967 - 2007 (Songs of Brotherhood, Childhood & Offspring: Anthology of Ex YU Rock Poetry 1967 – 2007).

== Discography ==
=== Studio albums ===
- Drugi Način (1975)
- Ponovo na putu (1982)
- Zgubidan (2016)

=== Compilations ===
- Drugi Način (1992)
- Drugi Način + Nepočin (with Nepočin, 1999)

=== Singles ===
- "Dugi put" / "Izgubljena žena" (1975)
- "Jugoslavija" / "Crnogorsko kolo" (1976)
- "Prođe ovaj dan" / "Zadnji put" (1978)
- "Balada o osmijehu" / "Obećaj mi proljeće" (1979)
