= Suzy (record label) =

- Founded: 1972
- Genre: Various
- Country of origin: Croatia
- Location: Zagreb
- Official website: Official website

Suzy Records (Croatian: Suzy produkcija gramofonskih ploča) is a record label based in Zagreb, Croatia.

== History ==
The company was established in the then Socialist Republic of Croatia in the Socialist Federal Republic of Yugoslavia in 1972.

After the abandonment of the socialist system and the subsequent breakup of Yugoslavia, during the 1990s the company transformed to SUZY d.o.o. (limited company). However, unlike its bigger competitors Jugoton and PGP-RTB which changed their names to Croatia Records and PGP-RTS respectively, Suzy continued to work under the same name. Several of its older important domestic titles were re-released in cooperation with another Croatian record label Hit Records during the 2000s.

== Artists ==
Some of the artists that have been signed to Suzy include:

- Biseri
- Boa
- Buldožer
- Zdravko Čolić
- Drugi Način
- Film
- Grupa 220
- Grupa Marina Škrgatića
- Metak
- Parni Valjak
- Patrola
- Prljavo Kazalište
- Tutti Frutti Balkan Band
- Valentino

Like other former Yugoslav record labels, Suzy also released numerous foreign pop and rock albums for the domestic market, including albums by AC/DC, Adam and the Ants, Asia, Blood, Sweat & Tears, Blue Öyster Cult, The Clash, Leonard Cohen, Phil Collins, Elvis Costello, Alice Cooper, Crosby, Stills, Nash & Young, The Doors, Bob Dylan, Eagles, Europe, Fleetwood Mac, John Fogerty, Aretha Franklin, Iron Butterfly, Michael Jackson, Janis Joplin, Judas Priest, Cyndi Lauper, Led Zeppelin, MC5, Midnight Oil, Mother's Finest, Stevie Nicks, Dolly Parton, Prince, The Rolling Stones, Sade, Santana, Bob Seger, Simon & Garfunkel and Paul Simon, Bruce Springsteen, Rod Stewart, Toto, Johnny Winter, Yes, and others. Suzy closely cooperated with many international major labels such as CBS Records for instance.

== Competition ==
Other major labels in the former Socialist Federal Republic of Yugoslavia were: PGP-RTB and Jugodisk from Belgrade, Jugoton from Zagreb, Diskoton from Sarajevo, ZKP RTLJ from Ljubljana, Diskos from Aleksandrovac, and others.

== Logos ==
From 1972, for this record label, there are three different logos. The first logo of the record label has been in use from 1972 to 1974, the second logo has been in use from 1974 to 1984, and the third and current logo is in use from 1984.

== See also ==
- List of record labels
- Suzy Soft
