= Heroji =

Yugoslav rock band

- Central figures of Heroji, Milutin Petrović (left) and Vladimir Đurić (right), in 1988

Background information
- Origin: Belgrade, SR Serbia, SFR Yugoslavia
- Genres: Rock; pop rock
- Years active: 1986–1988
- Label: PGP-RTB
- Past members: Vladimir Đurić; Milutin Petrović; Ivan Vdović; Miša Savić; Vladan Aćimović

Heroji (Serbian Cyrillic: Хероји, transl. Heroes) were a Yugoslav rock band formed in Belgrade in 1986.

Heroji were formed by vocalist Vladimir Đurić "Đura", who was soon joined by vocalist Milutin Petrović, both of them graduates from the Belgrade Faculty of Dramatic Arts. The band had unsteady lineup until 1988, when a lineup consisting of Đurić, Petrović, drummer Ivan Vdović "Vd", keyboardist Miša Savić and guitarist Vladan Aćimović was formed. The group released their only studio album in 1988, disbanding during the same year. Although short-lived, Heroji were a prominent act of the 1980s Yugoslav rock scene, known for their campy and humorous songs. After the group's disbandment, Đurić, Petrović and Savić continued their activity in various fields of culture, Đurić most notably as the leader of the band Đura i Mornari.

== History ==
=== 1986–1988 ===
The band Heroji was formed in Belgrade in 1986 by vocalist Vladimir Đurić "Đura", who graduated dramaturgy on the Belgrade Faculty of Dramatic Arts. The band worked in an unsteady lineup, but managed to gain attention of the media with their first demo recording, the song "Noću haramo" ("We Raven at Night"). Soon after the formation, the band was joined by Đurić's friend Milutin Petrović, who graduated film and television directing on the Belgrade Faculty of Dramatic Arts. Petrović was previously synthesizer player in the band Stalker and, from 1984 to 1986, director of the Television Belgrade music chart show Hit meseca (Hit of the Month). During the 1984–1986 period Petrović directed about 30 music videos for Yugoslav rock acts. He became Heroji's second vocalist, and both Đurić and Petrović composed the band's material.

Soon after the formation, the band recorded their debut release, the 7-inch single with the songs "Bilder" ("Bodybuilder") and "Instruktor skijanja" ("Ski Instructor"), released through PGP-RTB. The single featured simple rock tunes with humorous lyrics. In 1987 Heroji recorded their second 7-inch single, featuring the songs "Kiza rock" and "E = mc²", stylistically similar to their debut release. The song "Kiza rock" featured guest appearance by actor Slobodan "Boda" Ninković. The single was published with a plain white cover, used by PGP-RTB for promotional single records, with each of the single covers featuring a unique drawing made by members of the band.

Before the recording of their debut album, Heroji got a steady lineup, featuring beside Đurić and Petrović, drummer Ivan Vdović "Vd" (formerly of Suncokret, Šarlo Akrobata, Katarina II and Du Du A), keyboardist Miša Savić and guitarist Vladan Aćimović. The band released their first and only studio album, entitled 88, in 1988 through PGP-RTB. The album was produced by Momčilo Bajagić "Bajaga" and the band's logo on the album cover was designed by renowned architect Aleksandar Deroko. The album brought campy songs, with tracks "Zgromiću te ja" ("I Will Crush You"), "Gagarin", "Nikad robom" ("Never a Slave") and "Majmun" ("Monkey") seeing the biggest airplay. After a series of promotional concerts, the band ended their activity in the same year the album was released.

=== Post breakup ===
==== Vladimir Đurić ====
After the band ended their activity, Đurić worked as a screenwriter, director and TV author. He returned to music in 1993, when he released the album Maštarije (Fictions, named after Jorge Luis Borges' collection of stories). The album, released by L.V.O. Records, featured songs written during Heroji's activity. The album featured former Heroji member Miša Savić on keyboards, as well as Mladen Arsenijević on guitar and Rade Bulatović on bass guitar. The album featured songs with Caribbean rhythms and nostalgic lyrics. In 1997 Đurić published the album Mediteran (Mediterranean) with the backing band named Mornari (Sailors). The band featured Miško Petrović "Plavi" (accordion, formerly of VIA Talas, D' Boys and Ekatarina Velika, at the time member of Piloti), Mladen Arsenijević (guitar), Ratko Ljubičić (drums), Goran Rakočević (bass guitar) and Radovan Popović (saxophone). The material for the album was originally written for Đurić's radio drama Balada o unutrašnjem moru (The Ballad of the Inner Sea). The album was produced by Vlada Marković and was stylistically similar to Maštarije. In 1998 the compilation album The Best of Đura was released, featuring songs from Maštarije and Mediteran, as well as Heroji's "Zgromiću te ja" and previously unreleased "Balkanska" ("Balkan Song"). In 2000 Đura i Mornari (Đura and the Sailors) released the album Tropikalizam (Tropicalism), produced by Mornari member Mladen Arsenijević. In 2005 Đurić released the album Letnja terasa (Summer Terrace) under the name Đura Mornar (Đura the Sailor). He recorded the album in cooperation with keyboardist Milan Milosavljević, guitarist Zoran Anić and producer Aleksandar Janković. In 2014 Đura i Mornari released the album Algeria, in the lineup featuring, beside Vladimir Đurić, Radivoje "Rale" Bojanovski (guitar), Dejan "Deki" Resanović (bass guitar, accordion), Milan Milosavljević "Burda" (keyboards), Nikola Đokić (drums) and Boris Đurić (accordion). The song "Tekila Meksiko" ("Tequila Mexico") featured singer Prljavi Inspektor Blaža on vocals as guest. In 2017 Đura i Mornari together with the folk band Vojvođanski San (Vojvodina Dream) released the album Nove gradske pesme (New Town Songs), featuring the combination of Latin and Balkan old town music. The album featured Đura i Mornari songs, as well as covers of folk songs.

Đurić was a screenwriter, director and TV author in the TV shows Neobavezno (Optional), Petkom u 22 (Friday at 10:00 p.m.), Kult (Cult), Devedesete (Nineties), Nove vrednosti (New Values), Kult detektivi (Cult Detectives) and Služimo narodu (We Serve the People). From 1992 to 1994 he hosted the shows Kurs kreativnog pisanja (Creative Writing Course) and Đurina treš lista (Đura's Trash List). He wrote theatre plays Ban Strah (Ban Fear, played in Boško Buha Theatre in Belgrade), Džet set (Jet Set, played on Radio Belgrade), Bilijarska priča (A Pool Story, played in Belgrade Students' Cultural Centre), The Games People Play (played by Import Theatre Company from London), Belgrade by Night (played in Belgrade Students' Cultural Centre), Alisa u zemlji čuda (Alice in Wonderland, played in Boško Buha Theatre). He published a number of books: Hvalisavi roman & Super (The Bragging Novel & Super, 1991), Đurine smešne priče (Đura's Funny Stories, 1997), the collection of essays Mitologije tehnosveta (Mythologies of Technoworld, 1998), the novel London (1998), the poetry book Izabrane pesme (Selected Poems, 2002) and a book on Yugoslav new wave scene Glamur i ezoterija (Glamour and Esotericism, 2003). With journalist Goran Tarlać he co-authored Pesme iz stomaka naroda – Antologija turbo folka (Songs from the Belly of the People – The Anthology of Turbo-folk). He wrote a number of poems, short stories and essays. He wrote the screenplay for the TV film Koju igru igraš (Games People Play, 1992) and acted in Srđan Koljević's 2004 film The Red Colored Grey Truck.

==== Milutin Petrović ====
In 1987 Petrović directed his first work, the TV film Telefonomanija (Telephonemania). In 1988 he directed the TV adaptation of the rock opera Kreatori i kreature (Creators and Creatures), written by Vladimir Milačić and starring Yugoslav musicians Snežana Jandrlić, Dejan Cukić, Massimo Savić, Zana Nimani, Bora Đorđević, Amila Sulejmanović and Goran Čavajda "Čavke". In 1989 he directed the TV show Dome, slatki dome (Home Sweet Home).

At the beginning of the 1990s he directed the TV show on pop culture Popovanje (Popping). In 1992 he directed the hit musical Trinidad, played in Bitef Theatre and based on Robert Mitchum's album Calypso – Is like So…. The musical featured songs from the album with Serbian language lyrics, performed live during the play by Trinidad Trip Band, consisting of former Heroji member Miša Savić, percussionist Papa Nik and the members of the band Plejboj. The musical starred Ivana Mihić, Branislav "Bane" Vidaković and Slobodan "Boda" Ninković. The songs from the musical were released on the 1994 album The Trinidad, the recording of which featured Miša Savić and the members of the band Vera Kvark. In 1994 Petrović with Trinidad Trip Band performed on an unplugged concert held in Belgrade's Sava Centar. The recording of the songs "Kiza rock" and "Ona hoće mambo" ("She Wants Mambo"), the latter featuring actress Branka Katić on vocals, were released on the various artists live album Bez struje (Unplugged). The same album features a recording of Đurić performing "Zgromiću te ja".

Petrović directed seven feature films: Land of Truth, Love & Freedom (2000), South by Southeast (2005), the children's film Agi and Emma (2007), the documentary film Novo je da sam bila zlostavljana (What's New Is that I Was Molested, 2010), The Loop (2015), the documentary film I Pledge (2020) and Bad Blood (2021). He directed three TV series: Plaško Habrović uzvraća udarac (Scaredy Brave Strikes Back, 2016), the teen series Nebojša Čelik šou! (Nebojša Čelik Show!, 2019) and Bad Blood (2021). He acted in his films Land of Truth, Love & Freedom and South by Southeast and in his series Bad Blood, as well as in the films Dudes (2001), State (2013) and Humidity (2016). For Land of Truth, Love & Freedom he co-wrote the music with Miša Savić.

==== Miša Savić ====
During the 1980s Savić was a critically acclaimed author of minimal music. For a number of years he was the editor of Students' Cultural Centre classical music program. He cooperated with alternative rock musician Rambo Amadeus on the musical pieces performed in Sava Centar on 27 December 1994, during the screening of Fritz Lang's film Metropolis. The music was released in 1998 on the album Metropolis B Tour de Force. With Milutin Petrović he co-wrote the music for Petrović's film Land of Truth, Love & Freedom. He also wrote music for Petrović's film South by Southeast.

==== Ivan Vdović ====
After Heroji disbanded, Vdović retired from music. At the time of his activity with Heroji, he had already been tested HIV positive. He was the first person in Yugoslavia to be officially registered as HIV positive. He died of AIDS on 25 September 1992.

== Discography ==
=== Studio albums ===
- 88 (1988)

=== Singles ===
- "Bilder" / "Instruktor skijanja" (1986)
- "Kiza rock" / "E = mc²"
