= 19LIVE86 =

Live album by Ekatarina Velika
- Released: 1987
- Recorded: November 2, 1986
- Venues: "Kulušić" club, Zagreb
- Genres: Rock, post-punk
- Label: ZKP RTLJ

Ekatarina Velika chronology
S vetrom uz lice (1986)	19LIVE86 (1987)	Ljubav (1987)

19LIVE86 is the first live album by the Serbian rock band Ekatarina Velika, released in 1987. The album marks EKV's rising popularity following the commercial success of their third album S vetrom uz lice. It was recorded on November 2, 1986, at one of the five sold out performances in the famous Kulušić club in Zagreb.

== Track listing ==
Song arrangements by Ekatarina Velika.

All lyrics are written by Milan Mladenović; all music is composed by Ekatarina Velika, except where noted.

No.	Title	Music	Length
1.	"Aut"	Katarina II	4:32
2.	"Modro i zeleno"		4:16
3.	"Jesen"	Katarina II	5:43
4.	"Stvaran svet oko mene"		2:56
5.	"Budi sam na ulici"		5:18
6.	"Kao da je bilo nekad"		4:31
7.	"Ti si sav moj bol"		4:37
8.	"Tatoo"		3:00
9.	"Oči boje meda"		4:25
10.	"Novac u rukama"		4:01
11.	"Radostan dan"	Katarina II	5:35

== Personnel ==
- Milan Mladenović – vocals, guitar
- Margita Stefanović – keyboards, backing vocals
- Bojan Pečar – bass, backing vocals
- Ivan "Raka" Ranković – drums
