= Beograd (band) =

Serbian and Yugoslav electronic music band

- Beograd in 1982

Background information
- Origin: Belgrade, Serbia
- Genres: Synth-pop; electronic music; minimal music; experimental music
- Years active: 1980–1983; 2012–2020
- Labels: Jugoton, PGP-RTB, Anna Logue Records, Lampshade Media
- Past members: Slobodan Stanić; Ljubodrag Bubalo; Milan Bubalo; Dejan Stanisavljević; Igor Panić; Miroslav Ćatić; Sana Garić

Beograd (Serbian Cyrillic: Београд, trans. Belgrade) was a Serbian and Yugoslav electronic music band formed in Belgrade in 1980.

Beograd was formed by Slobodan Stanić (synthesizer) and Ljubodrag Bubalo (bass guitar, synthesizer), and was soon joined by Ljubodrag's brother Milan Bubalo (rhythm machine, electric drums) and Dejan Stanisavljević (synthesizer, vocals). Influenced by acts like Kraftwerk, Ultravox, The Human League and OMD, Beograd played a pioneering role in the Yugoslav synth-pop scene. Their debut studio album, Remek depo, released in 1983, brought a blend of synth-pop and brass instrument-oriented soul. Although the album was highly successful, the group disbanded soon after its release, with the band members continuing their careers in other groups of similar musical style.

In 2012, Dejan Stanisavljević and Milan Bubalo reformed Beograd with a group of younger musicians, releasing the album Pola/pola in 2015. The COVID-19 pandemic sent the band on an indefinite hiatus. Although the group have never officially announced their disbandment, there were no announcements of new releases or live performances since then. Milan Bubalo died in 2023.

== History ==
=== The beginnings (1980–1981) ===
The band was formed in Belgrade in late 1980 by Slobodan "Gricko" Stanić (synthesizer) and Ljubodrag "Ljuba" Bubalo (bass guitar, synthesizer), the latter being a former member of Uliks (Ulysses, the embryonic Zana) and Rulet (Roulette), who, influenced by acts like Kraftwerk, Ultravox, the Human League and OMD, decided to form a synth-oriented band. The two then invited Električni Orgazam keyboard player Ljubomir Đukić to join the band, but the deal eventually fell through. During the following year, the duo was joined by Ljubodrag's brother Milan "Mića" Bubalo (rhythm machine, electric drums) and Dejan Stanisavljević (synths, vocals). In the meantime, the band had recorded their newly written material on a four-channel Teac cassette recorder.

Beograd had their first live performance at the Belgrade Dadov Theatre, where they performed with an additional member who had sequenced the rhythm machine behind the stage. In their later live appearances, the band continued the trend of adding another member, usually U Škripcu drummer Miloš Obrenović, mainly performing in Dadov and the Engineering Students' Club. However, Stanić left the band, and after a two-month break, the band continued working as a trio. Intending to replace Stanić's playing with music samples, previously recorded by the band themselves, the band used the backing tracks on their live performances.

=== Success and breakup (1982–1983) ===
During the spring of 1982, the band released the 7-inch single "Sanjaš li u boji" ("Do You Dream In Color?") with the song "TV" as the B-side. The single, featuring Dejan Stanisavljević as the author of both music and lyrics, was arranged and produced by Saša Habić and released through Jugoton record label. Because it had been released in 500 copies only, the single is today considered a rarity and a collector's item.

From August until November 1982, the band recorded the material for their debut album at the PGP-RTB Studio V. The following year, the label released their debut album Remek depo (a pun coming from the term Remek delo which means Masterpiece, and the word depo, which means warehouse), featuring a blend of synth-pop and brass instrument-oriented soul, with politically provocative lyrics in the song like "Kontrolori" ("Controllers"), "Opasne igre" ("Dangerous Games") and "Mrak" ("The Dark"). All the lyrics were written by Stanisavljević, with the exception of lyrics for "Ulice su noćas..." ("Tonight the Streets Are..."), written by Milutin Petrović (who would later gain prominence as a member of Heroji and a film director). The album was produced by Saša Habić and featured timpanist Borislav "Bora Longa" Pavićević, avant-garde saxophonist Paul Pignon, and veteran jazz trumpeter Stjepko Gut as guest performers. The album brought the hits "Kontrolori" and "Opasne igre" and reached the fourth position on the Džuboks magazine top ten Yugoslav rock albums list in March 1983, remaining on the top ten list for twelve weeks. After the album release, in mid-1983, Stanisavljević left the band to work with the band Du Du A, Beograd thus disbanding.

=== Post-breakup (1983–2011) ===
After the Beograd disbandment, the members continued working in similar musical directions with other bands. Slobodan Stanić, with the members of new wave bands Defektno Efektni and Urbana Gerila, formed the band Berlinen Strasse (German for Berlin Street), influenced by the British post-punk and gothic rock scene and the German krautrock scene, performing songs with lyrics in German language. The band appeared on the various artists compilation Ventilator 202 demo top 10 in 1983 with the song "Maske" ("Mask"), and also appeared in Srđan Karanović's film Something in Between, performing the song "Achtung America" ("Attention America").

Ljubodrag Bubalo made a guest appearance on the Berlinen Strasse song "Maske" as the rhythm machine sequencer. During the same year, he had also appeared as the rhythm machine sequencer on the U Škripcu second studio album O, je! (Oh, Yeah!), on the track "Ples žutog lista" ("A Yellow Leaf's Dance"). With Milan Bubalo he formed the synth-pop band Haj'mo (C'mon) which released the 1984 EP Irina (Irene) before disbanding. The two brothers, signed as the Bubalo Bros, appeared on the Bebi Dol nationwide hit single "Rudi" ("Roody") as drum machine programmers.

Milan Bubalo joined the synth-pop band Laki Pingvini, with whom he released the highly successful EP Šizika (Crazy Girl) in 1983, and the studio albums, Muzika za mlade (Youth Music), released in 1984, and Striptiz (Striptease), released in 1985, before the band disbandment in 1989. He had reunited with Laki Pingvini on three occasions: in 1994 at an unplugged festival organized at the Belgrade Sava Centar, as special guests at a Delča i Slkekovi concert in March 2006, and as an opening act for the Duran Duran Belgrade concert held in October of the same year. He had made guest appearances as the drum machine programmer on the U Škripcu second studio album O, je!, on the hit song "Siđi do reke" ("Come Down To The River"), on all the tracks of the VIA Talas only studio album Perfektan dan za banana ribe (A Perfect Day for Bananafish), and the Jakarta debut single "Amerika" ("America"), all released in 1983.

Dejan Stanisavljević graduated from the Belgrade Faculty of Architecture. He worked with the band Du Du A, with which he released the 1996 album Ritual. He had appeared as the keyboard player on the Bebi Dol album Ruže i krv (Roses and Blood), released in 1984. In 1994, he moved to Canada, where he worked as an Electronic Arts animator, eventually becoming technical art director. During the 2000s and early 2010s he recorded a number of dubstep songs, releasing them in digital format.

In 2011, German record label Anna Logue Records released the 7-inch EP TV, featuring both tracks from the band's debut single, the song "Mrak" from Remek depo, as well as instrumental demo versions of the songs "TV" and "Mrak", recorded during the band's demo phase on ORWO cassettes.

=== Reunion (2012–2019) ===
In August 2012 Dejan Stanisavljević (on synthesizer and vocals) and Milan Bubalo (Ableton Live sequencer) reformed the band, with the new members, Sana Garić (of the band Xanax, synth, vocal), Igor Panić "Ziggy" (of the band Dža ili Bu, guitar, pedals) and Miroslav Ćatić (of Xanax, drums). the new lineup holding their first performance at the Belgrade club 20/44 on 9 September 2012. The band performed, beside their own songs, several songs by Garić's and Ćatić's band Xanax.

In June 2015 the band released their comeback album, Pola/pola (Fifty/Fifty). The album cover was designed by renowned comic book artist Aleksa Gajić. The album was previously announced by singles "Percepcija" ("Perception"), released in March 2013, "Zrnca prašine" ("Grains of Dust"), which featured samples of the traditional music of Hopi people and was dedicated to recently deceased painter Radovan Hiršl, released in November 2013, and "Weltschmerz", released in May 2015. Pola/pola was released on a USB flash drive. The release featured, besides 17 new tracks, a remastered edition of Remek depo, 7 videos, and a number of photographs and links to web pages about topics which inspired the members of the band in creating the album. The album was split into two sections, based on the tracks' pitch standard, the 440 Hz and the 432 Hz section. The second section featured songs in which the band experimented with Oriental music elements.

In the years following Pola/pola release, Beograd performed live in the lineup featuring Dejan Stanisavljević, Milan Bubalo and Sana Garić. The band had their last performances in 2019, the outbreak of COVID-19 pandemic in Serbia sending them on an indefinite hiatus, and, although the group never officially announced their disbandment, there were no announcements of new releases or live performances since then.

Milan Bubalo died on 7 december 2023.

== Legacy ==
In 2005, Serbian alternative rock band Dža ili Bu covered the song "Opasne igre" for their compilation album Retrovizor (Rear-view Mirror). In 2012, the same song was covered by Serbian heavy metal band Trigger on their cover album EX. In 2011, at the Belgrade Mixer festival, the New Serbian Scene band Svi na Pod! performed the album Remek depo in its entirety.

In 2006, the song "Opasne igre" was polled No. 93 on the B92 Top 100 Domestic Songs list.

The "Opasne igre" lyrics were featured in Petar Janjatović's book Pesme bratstva, detinjstva & potomstva: Antologija ex YU rok poezije 1967 - 2007 (Songs of Brotherhood, Childhood & Offspring: Anthology of Ex YU Rock Poetry 1967 – 2007).

== Discography ==
=== Studio albums ===
- Remek depo (1983)
- Pola/pola (2015)

=== Singles ===
- "TV" / "Sanjaš li u boji?" (1982)

=== Extended plays ===
- TV (2011)
