= B92 Top 100 Domestic Songs =

2006 list compiled by Serbian Radio B92

100 najboljih domaćih pesama (Top 100 Domestic Songs) was a list compiled by Serbian Radio B92. In 2006, Radio B92 organized the poll for the selection of top 100 Yugoslav songs. The whole list was presented on radio B92 on 5 November 2006. The list contains popular music songs from former Yugoslavia and the songs from successor states.

== The list ==
#	Song	Artist	Album	Year
1	"Par godina za nas"	Ekatarina Velika	Samo par godina za nas	1989
2	"Šejn"	Haustor	Bolero	1985
3	"Ti si sav moj bol"	Ekatarina Velika	S' vetrom uz lice	1986
4	"Kad hodaš"	Riblja Čorba	Večeras vas zabavljaju muzičari koji piju	1984
5	"Ona se budi"	Šarlo Akrobata	Paket aranžman	1980
6	"Oči boje meda"	Ekatarina Velika	Ekatarina Velika	1985
7	"1000 godina"	Partibrejkers	Partibrejkers I	1984
8	"Balkan"	Azra	Non-album single	1979
9	"Niko kao ja"	Šarlo Akrobata	Paket aranžman	1980
10	"Gracija"	Azra	Azra	1980
11	"Ena"	Haustor	Bolero	1985
12	"Lutka sa naslovne strane"	Riblja Čorba	Non-album single	1978
13	"Priča o Vasi Ladačkom"	Rani Mraz (Đorđe Balašević)	Odlazi cirkus	1980
14	"Sve će to, mila moja, prekriti ruzmarin, snjegovi i šaš"	Bijelo Dugme	Bitanga i princeza	1979
15	"Bacila je sve niz rijeku"	Indexi	Non-album single	1974
16	"A šta da radim"	Azra	Non-album single	1979
17	"April u Beogradu"	Zdravko Čolić	Non-album single	1975
18	"Maljčiki"	Idoli	Paket aranžman	1980
19	"Odlazak u noć"	Azra	Sunčana strana ulice	1981
20	"Ono sve što znaš o meni"	Arsen Dedić	Čovjek kao ja	1969
21	"Hoću da znam"	Partibrejkers	Kiselo i slatko	1994
22	"Bolje da nosim kratku kosu"	Pekinška Patka	Plitka poezija	1980
23	"Devojko mala"	Vlastimir "Ðuza" Stojiljković	Non-album single	1958
24	"O jednoj mladosti"	Josipa Lisac	Dnevnik jedne ljubavi	1973
25	"Rusija"	Idoli	Odbrana i poslednji dani	1982
26	"Nebo"	Električni Orgazam	Električni orgazam	1981
27	"Zamisli život u ritmu muzike za ples"	Film	Još jučer samo na filmu a sada i u vašoj glavi	1981
28	"Flojd"	Dado Topić	Non-album single	1979
29	"Čudna šuma"	YU Grupa	YU Grupa	1973
30	"Da li znaš da te volim"	Time	Time II	1975
31	"Zvižduk u 8"	Đorđe Marjanović	Non-album single	1964
32	"Loše vino"	Bijelo Dugme	Eto! Baš hoću!	1976
33	"Kolotečina"	Darkwood Dub	U nedogled	1996
34	"Misli mene gone"	Sunshine	Sh.g.t.m.	1996
35	"Treći Vavilon"	Darkwood Dub	U nedogled	1996
36	"Dobardan!"	Deca Loših Muzičara	Dobardan!	1993
37	"Zenica bluz"	Zabranjeno Pušenje	Das ist Walter	1984
38	"Divljina"	Beogradski Sindikat	BSSST…Tišinčina!	2001
39	"Okean"	La Strada	La strada	1987
40	"Zažmuri"	Bajaga i Instruktori	Sa druge strane jastuka	1985
41	"Moja prva ljubav"	Haustor	Haustor	1981
42	"Mi plešemo"	Prljavo Kazalište	Crno bijeli svijet	1980
43	"Rudi"	Bebi Dol	Non-album single	1983
44	"Jesen"	Katarina II	Katarina II	1984
45	"Nebo nebo plavo je"	Obojeni Program	Ovaj zid stoji krivo	1991
46	"Talasna dužina"	Leb i Sol	Leb i Sol 2	1978
47	"Crni leptir"	YU Grupa	YU Grupa	1973
48	"Priroda"	Kanda Kodža i Nebojša	Guarda Toma!	1996
49	"Dečija pesma"	Disciplina Kičme	Dečija pesma	1987
50	"Pričaj mi o ljubavi"	Ðavoli	Ljubav i moda	1986
51	"Ako možeš, zaboravi"	Bijelo Dugme	Uspavanka za Radmilu M.	1983
52	"Moja si"	Idoli	Odbrana i poslednji dani	1982
53	"Nije za nju"	Oliver Mandić	Probaj me	1980
54	"Mladiću moj"	Zana	Natrag na voz	1983
55	"Da mi je biti morski pas"	Metak	Non-album single	1980
56	"Šizika"	Laki Pingvini	Šizika (EP)	1983
57	"Detektivska priča"	Videosex	Video Sex '84	1984
58	"Sasvim običan dan"	Eva Braun	Pop Music	1995
59	"Osloni se na mene"	Oliver Mandić	Probaj me	1978
60	"Crno–bijeli svijet"	Prljavo Kazalište	Crno bijeli svijet	1980
61	"Plava pesma"	Smak	Crna dama	1977
62	"Rock'n'roll u Beogradu"	Time	Život u čizmama s visokom petom	1976
63	"Nemoj"	Disciplina Kičme	Sviđa mi se da ti ne bude prijatno	1983
64	"Ne mi dihat za ovratnik"	Lačni Franz	Ne mi dihat za ovratnik	1983
65	"Sama"	VIA Talas	Perfektan dan za banana ribe	1983
66	"Plava jutra"	Rex Ilusivii & Marina Perazić	Radio promo single	1985
67	"Smejem se, a plakao bih"	Oliver Mandić	Zbog tebe bih tucao kamen	1982
68	"Uhvati ritam"	Parni Valjak	Uhvati ritam	1984
69	"Ogledalo lune"	Luna	Nestvarne stvari	1984
70	"Prvi sneg"	Suncokret	Moje bube	1977
71	"Siđi do reke"	U Škripcu	O je!	1983
72	"Krokodili dolaze"	Električni Orgazam	Paket aranžman	1980
73	"Troje"	Xenia	Tko je to učinio?	1984
74	"Osmi dan"	Kristali	Kristali	1994
75	"Praslovan"	Lačni Franz	Ikebana	1981
76	"Novo vrijeme"	Buldožer	Živi bili pa vidjeli	1979
77	"Program tvog kompjutera"	Denis & Denis	Čuvaj se!	1984
78	"Plima"	Indexi	Plima	1972
79	"Samo tebe znam"	Veliki Prezir	Veliki Prezir	1996
80	"Neprilagođen"	Film	Još jučer samo na filmu a sada i u vašoj glavi	1981
81	"Jutro će promijeniti sve"	Indexi	Non-album single	1968
82	"Prepad"	Boban Petrović	Žur	1981
83	"Kao pjesma"	Cacadoo Look	Tko mari za čari	1987
84	"Ska-kavac joj zaš'o u rukavac"	Laboratorija Zvuka	Non-album single	1980
85	"Boje su u nama"	Film	Sva čuda svijeta	1983
86	"Zauvijek"	Psihomodo Pop	Godina zmaja	1988
87	"Ne veruj u idole"	Piloti	Piloti	1981
88	"Osmijeh"	Grupa 220	Non-album single	1967
89	"Ostani uz mene"	Ðavoli	Ostani uz mene	1988
90	"Ogledalo"	Petar i Zli Vuci	Artistička radna akcija	1981
91	"Grizi metak"	Plejboj	Sviraj dečko	1994
92	"Dugo toplo ljeto"	Ðavoli	Balade / Kad se nađem u predjelu noći...	1989
93	"Opasne igre"	Beograd	Remek depo	1983
94	"Jefimija"	Lutajuća Srca	Lutajuća Srca 1	1973
95	"Znaš li devojku"	Du Du A	Primitivni ples	1983
96	"Stranica dnevnika"	Parni Valjak	Gradske priče	1979
97	"Goodbye teens"	Plavi Orkestar	Soldatski bal	1985
98	"Ne brini mama"	Buldožer	Zabranjeno plakatirati	1977
99	"Utisci"	Kozmetika	Kozmetika	1983
100	"Mi smo Dʼ Boys"	Dʼ Boys	Ajd' se zezamo	1983

== Reactions ==
Darko Rundek, the former frontman of Haustor stated:

I'm glad "Šejn" is ranked so high [second] on that list and I'm not complaining about it not being first. Among these 100 chosen songs there are quite a few excellent ones and I can't pick out only one.

Toma Grujić, Radio B92 executive in charge of musical programming, stated:

This list is not an intersection of the masses' taste, but it reflects the taste of younger, more educated, communicative and open people. It is quite logical that most of these songs are from the 1980s not only because of the fame of that "golden age", but also because of the mere fact that the production had been greater and of better quality than in any other period.

Ivan Fece "Firchie", the former drummer of Ekatarina Velika stated in 2007:

I think, as far as I remember, six of Milan Mladenović's songs—both with Šarlo and EKV—made the top ten. I know that "Par godina za nas" came in first, and that, if I am correct, the fifth or sixth song was again an EKV track. Without a trace of pretentiousness, I am not at all surprised [that people voted that way]. It's like being offered three meals at a table, one is good, the other two are not that good, which does not mean they are necessarily bad, but I don't want to turn sappy. I knew Milan quite well, we were good friends for years, since all the way back in 1978. He was a good dude to such an extent that him being that way naturally led to him doing quality work in Šarlo as well as Katarina and EKV. And I find it quite logical that his quality remains [recognized] to this day. But there is yet another driblet here. We all know that Jimi Hendrix died, that many bands disappeared, Janis Joplin, Jim Morrison, etc. and that a piece of that mystique is present here as well. It would be unfair to omit mentioning that EKV's entire original lineup is no longer with us, and that this specific circumstance breeds mystique and fascination that adds to the band's and his continued relevance. All of which does not reduce the quality that he left after him.

== See also ==
- YU 100: najbolji albumi jugoslovenske rok i pop muzike
- Kako (ni)je propao rokenrol u Srbiji
- Rock Express Top 100 Yugoslav Rock Songs of All Times
