= Samo ponekad =

Song by Šarlo Akrobata

from the album Bistriji ili tuplji čovek biva kad...
- Released: July 1981
- Recorded: April–May 1981
- Genre: New wave, punk rock, art punk
- Length: 2:19
- Label: Jugoton
- Songwriter: Šarlo Akrobata
- Producers: Akpiđoto - (Šarlo Akrobata, Mile "Pile" Miletić, Đorđe Petrović, Toni Jurij)

"Samo ponekad" is a song by the Yugoslav new wave band Šarlo Akrobata, from the album Bistriji ili tuplji čovek biva kad..., released in 1981.

== Cover versions ==
- Električni Orgazam frontman Srđan Gojković "Gile" covered the song on the Jako dobar tattoo Milan Mladenović tribute album in 2002.
- Serbian actor and musician Nikola Pejaković "Kolja" covered the song and released it as a digital download single for his second studio album Kolja, released in 2009.

== Bibliography ==
- EX YU ROCK enciklopedija 1960-2006, Janjatović Petar; ISBN 978-86-905317-1-4
