= O, O, O... =

Song by Šarlo Akrobata

from the album Bistriji ili tuplji čovek biva kad...
- Released: July 1981
- Recorded: April–May 1981
- Genre: New wave
- Length: 2:59
- Label: Jugoton
- Songwriter: Šarlo Akrobata
- Producers: Akpiđoto - (Šarlo Akrobata, Mile "Pile" Miletić, Đorđe Petrović, Toni Jurij)

"O, O, O..." is a song by the Yugoslav new wave band Šarlo Akrobata, from the album Bistriji ili tuplji čovek biva kad..., released in 1981.

== Cover versions ==
- Električni Orgazam frontman Srđan Gojković "Gile" covered the song on the Jako dobar tattoo Milan Mladenović tribute album in 2002.
- Serbian punk rock Novembar covered the song on the Kao da je bilo nekad... Posvećeno Milanu Mladenoviću Milan Mladenović tribute in 2003. The song also appeared on their 2008 studio album Radulizam.

== External links and references ==
- EX YU ROCK enciklopedija 1960-2006, Janjatović Petar; ISBN 978-86-905317-1-4
