= Samo par godina za nas =

Studio album by Ekatarina Velika
- Released: 1989
- Recorded: October and November 1988, "M" Studio Novi Sad and January 1989, Studio Barbaro Bukovac
- Genre: Alternative rock
- Label: PGP RTB
- Producer: Mitar Subotić; Theodore Yanni; Ekatarina Velika

Ekatarina Velika chronology
Ljubav (1987)	Samo par godina za nas (1989)	Dum Dum (1991)

Professional ratings
Review scores
Source	Rating
Ritam	2/5 stars

Samo par godina za nas (English: Only a Few Years Left for Us) is the fifth studio album by the Serbian rock band Ekatarina Velika, released in 1989. It is the last one recorded with Bojan Pečar as a bassist. The album was produced by Mitar "Suba" Subotić, Theodore Yanni and Ekatarina Velika, with Suba and Yanni also included as guest stars. Another guest star was Tanja Jovićević (the lead singer of the band Oktobar 1864) on backing vocals and Zvonimir Đukić on guitar.

In November 2006, "Par godina za nas" was voted the best former Yugoslav popular music song (on the B92 Top 100 Domestic Songs list) by the listeners of Serbian B92 radio.

== Track listing ==
All music is composed by Ekatarina Velika, arrangements by Ekatarina Velika and Mitar Subotić

No.	Title	Lyrics	Length
1.	"Iznad grada (Above The City)"	Milan Mladenović	4:57
2.	"Krug (The Circle)"	Milan Mladenović	3:09
3.	"Srce (Heart)"	Milan Mladenović	3:37
4.	"Sinhro (Synchro)"	Margita Stefanović	4:11
5.	"Nisam mislio na to (I Didn't Think About That)"	Margita Stefanović	5:30
6.	"Par godina za nas (A Few Years Left For Us)"	M. Mladenović, M. Stefanović	4:10
7.	"Amerika (America)"	Milan Mladenović	5:10
8.	"Ona i on i on i ja (Her And Him And Him And I)"	Milan Mladenović	4:18
9.	"Ona mi je rekla (She Told Me)"	Milan Mladenović	5:27
10.	"Svetilište (The Shrine)"	Zoran Rosić	3:22

== Personnel ==
- Milan Mladenović - vocals, guitar
- Margita Stefanović - piano, keyboards
- Bojan Pečar - bass
- Žika Todorović - drums

== Charts ==
Weekly chart performance for Samo par godina za nas
Chart (2024)	Peak position
Croatian International Albums (HDU)	2
