= Dum Dum (album) =

Studio album by Ekatarina Velika
- Released: 1991
- Recorded: spring 1991, "M" Studio, Radio Novi Sad
- Genre: Alternative rock
- Label: PGP RTB
- Producer: Theodore Yanni; Đorđe Petrović

Ekatarina Velika chronology
Samo par godina za nas (1989)	Dum Dum (1991)	Neko nas posmatra (1993)

Dum Dum is the sixth studio album by the Yugoslav band Ekatarina Velika, released in 1991. Srdjan "Žika" Todorović was here replaced by Marko Milivojević (ex Morbidi, U Škripcu), who remained the band's drummer till the end. It is the only EKV album written entirely by Milan Mladenović.

The album reflects the political climate in Yugoslavia at the beginning of the 1990s, and it is generally considered to be the darkest record EKV has made. The album was produced by Theodore Yanni and Đorđe Petrović. The guest stars were Mitar "Suba" Subotić, and Tanja Jovićević (backing vocals).

== Track listing ==
All lyrics are written by Milan Mladenović; all music is composed by Milan Mladenović, arrangements by Ekatarina Velika

No.	Title	Length
1.	"Dum Dum (Bang Bang)"	3:36
2.	"Siguran (Secure)"	4:44
3.	"Odgovor (The Answer)"	4:26
4.	"Karavan (Caravan)"	3:57
5.	"Idemo (Let's Go)"	4:05
6.	"Zabranjujem (I Forbid)"	3:56
7.	"Glad (Hunger)"	3:27
8.	"Bledo (Pale)"	4:18
9.	"Hladan (Cold)"	3:01
10.	"Dolce Vita"	4:16

== Personnel ==
- Milan Mladenović - vocals, guitar
- Margita Stefanović - piano, keyboards
- Bata Božanić - bass
- Dušan Petrović - bass
- Marko Milivojević - drums

== Charts ==
Weekly chart performance for Dum Dum
Chart (2024)	Peak position
Croatian International Albums (HDU)	4
