= Ljubav (Ekatarina Velika album) =

Studio album by Ekatarina Velika
- Released: 1987
- Recorded: August and September 1987, PGP RTB Studios Belgrade and SIM Studio Zagreb
- Genre: Alternative rock; art rock
- Label: PGP RTB
- Producer: Theodore Yanni

Ekatarina Velika chronology
19LIVE86 (1987)	Ljubav (1987)	Samo par godina za nas (1989)

Ljubav (English: Love) is the fourth studio album by the Serbian rock band Ekatarina Velika, released in 1987. The new band member, replacing Ivan "Raka" Ranković on drums, was Srđan "Žika" Todorović (ex Radnička kontrola, Bezobrazno zeleno, Disciplina kičme). It was their first album released for the Serbian label PGP RTB, and also the first EKV album produced by the Australian musician Theodore Yanni. The album is considered to be one of the band's best and also one of the best records released in (ex)Yugoslavia.

== Track listing ==
All music is composed by Ekatarina Velika

A side
No.	Title	Lyrics	Length
1.	"Zemlja (Earth)"	M. Mladenović, M. Stefanović	3:57
2.	"Pored mene (Beside Me)"	M. Mladenović	5:25
3.	"Ljubav (Love)"	M. Mladenović	3:33
4.	"7 dana (7 Days)"	M. Stefanović	6:28
5.	"Voda (Water)"	M. Mladenović	4:40
6.	"Prvi i poslednji dan (The First And The Last Day)"	M. Mladenović, M. Stefanović	3:37
7.	"Ljudi iz gradova (People From The Cities)"	M. Mladenović	3:25
8.	"Zid (The Wall)"	M. Mladenović	4:01
9.	"Tonemo (We're Sinking)"	M. Mladenović	4:10
Total length:			39:16

== Personnel ==
- Milan Mladenović - vocals, guitar
- Margita Stefanović - piano, keyboards, backing vocals
- Bojan Pečar - bass
- Žika Todorović - drums

=== Additional personnel ===
- Theodore Yanni - guitar

== Legacy ==
In 2015 Ljubav album cover was ranked the 9th on the list of 100 Greatest Album Covers of Yugoslav Rock published by web magazine Balkanrock.

== Charts ==
Weekly chart performance for Ljubav
Chart (2024)	Peak position
Croatian International Albums (HDU)	3
