= Perfektan dan za banana ribe =

Studio album by Talas
- Released: 1983
- Recorded: 1983
- Studio: MS Studio (Belgrade, Yugoslavia)
- Genre: New wave
- Length: 27:39
- Label: Sarajevo Disk
- Producer: Bojan Pečar; Boban Petrović

Perfektan dan za banana ribe (transl. A Perfect Day for Bananafish) is the first and the only album by the Serbian rock band Talas. The album was printed in 3000 copies, and is available on LP only, since the album has not been reissued on CD.

== Background ==
Having released their two songs on the Artistička radna akcija compilation, the band started preparing their debut release. The album was recorded in the MS Studio in Belgrade and was produced by Bojan Pečar and Boban Petrović. Perfektan dan za banana ribe (which got the name from J. D. Salinger's short-story A Perfect Day for Bananafish) was released in 1983 by Sarajevo Disk. The album featured eight songs with the opening track, "Sama" ("Alone") becoming a nationwide hit and appearing on the Svetislav Prelić's Šećerna vodica movie soundtrack. Milan "Mića" Bubalo (drum machine), Ivan "Vd" Vdović (drums), Milan Mladenović (guitar) and Vuk Vujačić (saxophone) all worked on the record as guest musicians.

== Track listing ==
All music and lyrics written by Talas.

| No. | Title | Length |
|---|---|---|
| 1. | "Sama" (Alone) | 3:31 |
| 2. | "Stal-No" (Constant-Ly) | 3:04 |
| 3. | "Banana reggae" | 4:16 |
| 4. | "Brodovi" (Ships) | 3:46 |
| 5. | "Daj mi znak" (Give me a sign) | 3:20 |
| 6. | "Kraj" (The end) | 3:27 |
| 7. | "Gorke suze L.M. (Lady Mackbet)" (Bitter tears L.M. (Lady Macbeth)) | 4:13 |
| 8. | "Čarobnjaci ulice" (Street Wizards) | 2:02 |

== Personnel ==
=== Talas ===
- Bojan Pečar (vocals, bass, guitar, synthesizer, percussion)
- Mira Mijatović (vocals)

=== Additional Personnel ===
- Dušan Gerzić (saxophone, drums)
- Milan Bubalo (rhythm machine)
- Ivan "Vd" Vdović (drums, percussion)
- Milan Mladenović (guitar)
- Vuk Vujačić (saxophone)
- Boban Petrović (production, engineering)
