= Ekatarina Velika =

Serbian and Yugoslav rock band

Ekatarina Velika Екатарина Велика
- EKV in 1986: Milan Mladenović, Ivan Ranković, Bojan Pečar, and Margita Stefanović.

Background information
- Also known as: Katarina II; EKV
- Origin: Belgrade, SR Serbia, SFR Yugoslavia
- Genres: Post-punk; alternative rock; art rock; new wave; neo-psychedelia; gothic rock
- Years active: 1982–1994
- Labels: ZKP RTLJ; PGP RTB; PGP RTS
- Spinoff of: Šarlo Akrobata
- Past members: see the members section

Ekatarina Velika (Serbian Cyrillic: Екатарина Велика, lit. 'Catherine the Great'), sometimes referred to as EKV (Serbian Cyrillic: ЕКВ) for short, was a Serbian and Yugoslav rock band from Belgrade, and was one of the most successful and influential Yugoslav music acts.

Initially called Katarina II (Serbian Cyrillic: Катарина II, lit. 'Catherine II'), the band had built up a devoted following that greatly intensified and expanded after the death of its frontman Milan Mladenović in 1994, which caused the band to dissolve. The group's core consisted of singer and guitarist Milan Mladenović, keyboardist Margita Stefanović and bassist Bojan Pečar, with other members mostly remaining for comparatively shorter periods.

== History ==
=== Post-punk years (1982–1986) ===
==== Katarina II ====
In February 1982, following the disbandment of Šarlo Akrobata, 24-year-old guitarist and vocalist Milan Mladenović decided to form a new band with an old friend — 22-year-old guitarist Gagi Mihajlović. Playing music together again after being bandmates a few years earlier at Limunovo Drvo, Mladenović and Mihajlović decided to name their new band Katarina II after Mihajlović's unrequited love — a girl named Katarina. Rounding out Katarina II's inaugural lineup were Dušan Dejanović (another former Limunovo Drvo member) on drums and Zoran "Švaba" Radomirović on bass guitar.

During late 1982, after their performance at the Topčiderska zvezda cinema, the band was joined by the 23-year-old classically trained pianist Margita Stefanović. Shortly after, the rhythm section left with Radomirović joining Du Du A and Dejanović going over to heated rivals Disciplina Kičme.

The vacant drummer position was filled by Branko "Mango" Kuštrin (formerly of Grupa I), but after he left within a month, Milan's former bandmate from Šarlo Akrobata Ivan "VD" Vdović became the new drummer. At the same time, in early 1983, Bojan Pečar (former VIA Talas bassist) joined on bass. In spring 1983, the band took part in Zagreb Biennale, receiving positive reviews. Their material for the debut album material was recorded soon after, featuring guest appearance by actor Svetislav Goncić on tin whistles. The recording sessions for the material were completed in Enco Lesić's Druga Maca studio, however, the material was unusable due to a variety of reasons, most of them having to do with the studio's inferior technical equipment.

The following year, the band took the offer from fellow musician and RTV Ljubljana's musical director Srđan Marjanović of re-recording their debut album material in the state-owned media company's studios. Katarina II's eponymous debut album was thus released in 1984 by RTV Ljubljana's in-house record label ZKP RTLJ. Mostly featuring Mladenović's lyrics, except for the Mihajlović-written tracks "Vrt" ("The Garden") and "Platforme" ("The Platforms"), while the music was a collaboration between the two, the material was produced by Đorđe Petrović featuring guest appearances by Mario Čelik on congas and Film member Jurij "Kuzma Videosex" Novoselić on saxophone. Only 3,000 copies of the album were released, indicative of label's low commercial expectations. Though it got good reviews, receiving praise for successfully linking Mladenović's descriptive lyrical sensibility with the energetic new wave sound on tracks like "Aut" ("Out"), "Jesen" ("Autumn"), "Radostan dan" ("A Joyful Day"), "Treba da se čisti" ("It Ought To Be Cleaned"), "Ja znam" ("I Know"), Katarina II album was not a commercial success. In a 1985 interview Mladenović complained about the album's poor sound quality, as well as what he felt to be lack of support from the label.

Soon after their debut album, the band went through more lineup changes amid disagreements and personality clashes between Mladenović and Mihajlović. Mihajlović also ran afoul of the law — a transgression that led to his imprisonment — and after serving the punishment was informed by the rest of the band he was no longer a Katarina II member. However, since Mihajlović claimed rights to the "Katarina II" name, he forced the band into using another one. Later he collaborated with Vlada Divljan before moving to the United States where he has been residing ever since. Additionally, drummer Vdović left due to drug abuse problems, later joining Du Du A and the band Heroji, being replaced by the former Luna drummer Ivan "Firchie" Fece. The remaining members continued working as Ekatarina Velika, after Catherine II of Russia, or EKV for short. Due to constant SFR Yugoslavia-wide touring, with frequent stops in Belgrade, Zagreb and Ljubljana, and occasional TV spots, the band's popularity had gradually grown.

==== Ekatarina Velika ====
In early 1985, the band recorded their second studio album at SIM studio in Zagreb. Produced by Vladimir Smolec featuring guest appearances by Massimo Savić as well as Karlowy Wary member and SIM studio co-owner Tomo in der Mühlen, Ekatarina Velika gave the band with its first bona fide hits, "Oči boje meda" ("Honey Colored Eyes"), "Modro i zeleno" ("Indigo and Green") and "Tattoo". In keeping with the theme of the "Tattoo" track, the album cover arranged by Dušan Gerzić features the band members painted in Native American ritual body art. After the album release on 22 March 1985, they played outside of Yugoslavia for the first time, making a positive impression at Culture Days in Turin, Italy. Another memorable concert took place in Zagreb as part of Bolje vas našli Belgrade-Zagreb band exchange.

Towards the end of 1985, Fece left the band to serve his mandatory Yugoslav People's Army service, later joining Laboratorija Zvuka, and was replaced by Ivan "Raka" Ranković from the band Tvrdo Srce i Velike Uši. The following year, the new lineup released the third studio album S vetrom uz lice (Faced Against the Wind), proving to be the breakthrough album that turned them into bona fide stars. The album was produced by Milan Mladenović, Margita Stefanović and Dragan Čačinović. With the hits "Budi sam na ulici" ("Be Alone on the Street"), "Ti si sav moj bol" ("You Are All My Anguish"), "Novac u rukama" ("Money in the Hands"), and "Kao da je bilo nekad" ("As If It Had Once Been") came some lukewarm reviews from the critics complaining about the similarities to the works of the Simple Minds.

After the album release, the band toured extensively all over former Yugoslavia, and the recording of one of the five sold-out performances at the Zagreb club Kulušić, made on 2 November 1986, was released in early 1987 on the live album 19LIVE86. The band promoted the release of the live album in Belgrade during January 1987 and triumphed at Dom Omladine with six sold-out shows. During spring of the same year, Ivan Ranković decided to leave EKV in order to form a new group Ulica Od Meseca with his old bandmates from Tvrdo Srce i Velike Uši. Ranković was replaced by the actor Srđan Todorović, a former Disciplina Kičme member, as drummer, playing his first show on 9 April 1987 at the New Rock festival held at the La Locomotive club in Paris. On autumn of the same year, the band got the Sedam Sekretara SKOJa award for the achievements on the second and third studio album.

=== Alternative rock years (1987–1991) ===
During the summer of 1987, the band released the album Ljubav (Love), co-produced by the band with the Australian musician Theodore Yanni. It displayed a more guitar-oriented sound, along with stylized sleeve done by Margita and artist Vuk Vidor. Prominent tracks from the album include "Zemlja" ("Earth"), "7 Dana" ("7 Days"), "Pored mene" ("Beside Me"), "Ljudi iz gradova" ("People From The Cities"), and "Ljubav" ("Love"). It had also shown the first signs of Milan's depressive lyrics, as exemplified by song "Tonemo" ("We Are Sinking"). The album had also confirmed their live attraction status with two consecutive sold out shows at Belgrade's Pionir Hall sports arena. New extensive tour commenced in early 1988, and EKV enlisted help from Tanja Jovićević of Oktobar 1864 and Zvonimir Đukić from Van Gogh to appear as backing live musicians. Fece had also promptly rejoined the band on tour, shortly replacing Srđan Todorović before moving away to New York City in May 1988.

In January 1989, the band finished the recording sessions for the album Samo par godina za nas (Only a Few Years for Us), released during the same year, featuring guest appearances by Mitar Subotić (guitar, album production) and Tanja Jovićević (backing vocals). The critics regarded this album as a mere copy of the concept from the previous album. Several hits from the album include "Krug" ("The Circle"), "Par godina za nas" ("A Few Years for Us"), and "Srce" ("Heart"). Despite the mixed critics, the band were at their peak performing at the EBU-UER rock festival in Novi Sad, the 1990 Midem festival in Cannes and the first European rock music Bienalle held in Toulouse. After the tour, Todorović left the band, focusing on his acting career. Bojan Pečar also decided to leave the band moving to London. The new members became the former VIA Talas, D' Boys and Piloti member Miško Petrović "Plavi" on bass and the former U Škripcu member Marko Milivojević on drums.

The sixth studio album Dum dum (Bang Bang), released in 1991, featured the Plejboj member Dušan Petrović and session musician Bata Božanić as bass players, Tanja Jovićević on backing vocals, Zvonimir Đukić on guitar and Mitar Subotić on keyboards and machines. The album, produced by Theodore Yanni, featured the prominent songs "Zabranjujem" ("I Forbid"), "Idemo" ("Let's Go"), "Dum dum" ("Bang Bang") and "Bledo" ("Pale"), inspired by the outbreak of the Yugoslav Wars and the general political and economic situation in the country. The following year, Mladenović participated in the anti-war project Rimtutituki, also featuring Električni Orgazam and Partibrejkers members, releasing the single "Slušaj 'vamo" ("Listen Up"). During the anti-war protests in Belgrade, the band organized a concert on the Republic Square and also they performed anti-war songs in an open truck while circulating the Belgrade streets.

=== Mainstream rock years (1992–1994) ===
During the middle of 1992 the band toured with the new bassist Dragiša Uskoković "Ćima", with whom they recorded the final studio album Neko nas posmatra (Somebody Is Watching Us), released in May 1993. The album featured a more accessible and communicative sound especially present in the songs "Ponos" ("Pride"), "Jadransko more" ("The Adriatic Sea"), "Just Let Me Play Some Modern R'n'R Music" and "Zajedno" ("Together"). For the first time, the band had included a cover song on and album, "Istina Mašina" ("Truth Machine"), originally performed by the Yugoslav rock band Time. The album was produced by Mladenović and featured Srđan Todorović, Tanja Jovićević and a children's choir as guest performers.

After the album release, in September of the same year, Ekatarina Velika, Električni Orgazam, Partibrejkers and the Zagreb band Vještice performed in Prague and Berlin on the concerts entitled Ko to tamo pjeva (Who's That Singing Over There). At the time, Mladenović and Stefanović held occasional unplugged club performances, often featuring guest appearances by the Partibrejkers guitarist Nebojša Antonijević "Anton" and various jazz musicians, until Milan's departure to Brazil, where he worked on a project called Angel's Breath, together with Mitar Subotić and a line-up of Brazilian musicians. The two started recording the material partially written in 1985 when, with the guitarist Goran Vejvoda, they had several live appearances under the moniker Dah Anđela (Angel's Breath).

=== Breakup and post-breakup ===
The band resumed their activities when Mladenović returned to Serbia. There were plans to make a new album, tentatively titled Ponovo zajedno (Together Again), but the idea was shelved because of Milan's health problems. EKV played what would turn out to be their last ever show on 24 August 1994 in Budva at the Pjesma Mediterana festival. The very next day Milan was held in a hospital, and it was soon discovered that he had pancreatic cancer. A few months later, on 5 November 1994, Milan Mladenović died in Belgrade, at the age of 36, thus Ekatarina Velika ceased to exist.

Margita Stefanović continued working as a musician, for a short period of time performing with the cover band Kurajberi. In 1995, with Vladimir Stojanović, as an ambiental music duo EQV, she released the album Ti si sav moj bol (You Are All My Anguish), released by the Austrian record label Coop Arts Crafts Unltd. In October of the same year, EQV appeared at the Vienna Talkit festival. She had also made occasional live appearances with the bands Direktori, Glisers and Zion Banda, and appeared as guest on the albums of several Belgrade rock bands. In 1996, she appeared on the Električni Orgazam unplugged live album Živo i akustično (Live and Acoustic), and in 1998, on the fiftieth anniversary of the Universal Declaration of Human Rights signing, she appeared in Pula with Zoran Stojanović, the leader of the Zagreb band Veliki Bijeli Slon, being, along with Rambo Amadeus, the first Serbian musician to play in modern-day Croatia after the Yugoslav Wars.

During the early 1997, a posthumous live album entitled Live '88 was released, featuring the recordings of the performances from Zagreb and Novi Sad held during the 1988 tour. The Zagreb recordings, made at the Kulušić club, were announced by the rock critic Dražen Vrdoljak and featured Theodore Yanni on guest guitar. The live recordings were owned by Fece who initiated the album release. During the same year, Margita Stefanović founded the record label EKV Records and started reissuing EKV studio album with bonus material. The Ljubav reissue featured live bonus material made at the Belgrade Dom Omladine on 13 November 1991 and the 1988 Novi Sad SNP performance, Samo par godina za nas featured the live bonus tracks from the Avala fest held in September 1990 and Dum dum featured alternate and demo recordings and the 1991 Dom Omladine live tracks.

PGP RTS also contributed the CD reissuing by releasing the compilation album Kao nada, kao govor, kao more... (Like Hope, Like Speech, Like the Sea...) in 1997, featuring selected material from the latter four studio albums. During 2001 and 2002, EKV Records and IPS music reissued the rest of the band's catalog, also featuring bonus live material. The label also released the live album Kao u snu - EKV live 1991 (As If in a Dream - EKV Live 1991) featuring the Belgrade Dom Omladine 1991 performance. During the same year, a tribute album Kao da je bilo nekad... (Posvećeno Milanu Mladenoviću) (As If It Had Once Been) was released. The following year, a live tribute album Jako dobar tattoo - Tribute to EKV (A Very Good Tatto - Tribute to EKV) was released.

In 2017, Mascom Records released the double live album Krug (The Circle), featuring the recording of Mladenović's and Stefanović's unplugged performance held in Priština in May 1994, only half a year before Mladenović's death.

Ivan Vdović died of AIDS on 25 September 1992 at age 31. Milan Mladenović died of pancreatic cancer (he was also HIV positive) on 5 November 1994 at age 36. Bojan Pečar died of a heart attack on 13 October 1998 at age 38. Dušan Dejanović died of AIDS on 16 November 2000. On 18 September 2002 Margita Stefanović died at age 43 of AIDS and toxoplasmosis, being the fifth band member to die relatively young.

== Legacy ==
Ekatarina Velika is considered one of the top and most influential acts of the former Yugoslav rock scene. Of the bands heavily influenced by Ekatarina Velika, by far the most notable is Van Gogh, which has risen to the status of one of the most popular rock acts in Serbia in the second half of the 1990s. Another band highly inspired by EKV is the alternative rock band Block Out. The band's work was also praised by Yugoslav rock icons like Rambo Amadeus and Dado Topić.

In 2003, a tribute album to Mladenović entitled Kao da je bilo nekad... Posvećeno Milanu Mladenoviću (Like It Happened Someday... Dedicated to Milan Mladenović) was released. The album consists of 15 covers of Mladenović's songs (14 EKV and one Šarlo Akrobata song) by a range of musicians, spanning from rock veteran Dado Topić, over EKV contemporaries like Električni Orgazam, Darko Rundek, Partibrejkers, Miško Plavi, Vlada Divljan, Del Arno Band, and Tanja Jovićević, to younger acts, like Jarboli, Darkwood Dub, Novembar, Night Shift, Block Out, and VROOM. Mladenović's former Šarlo Akrobata bandmate and Disciplin A Kitschme founder and frontman Dušan Kojić "Koja" also appeared on the album under the pseudonym Crni Zub (with Nova moćna organizacija band), participating in the cover of "Zemlja" as the first track opening the album.

Another tribute album, released in 2003, was a live album Jako dobar tattoo - Tribute to EKV (Very Good Tattoo - Tribute to EKV), recorded at the tribute concert held on February 22, 2003, in Zagreb's Tvornica club. The performers included Croatian bands Le Cinema, Vatra, and Urban & 4, and solo artists Massimo Savić with EKV tribute band Veliki Bijeli Slon, Darko Rundek with his Cargo Orkestar, and Električni Orgazam frontman Srđan "Gile" Gojković, also with Veliki Bijeli Slon. The album consists of 13 live covers, each artist performing several.

The book YU 100: najbolji albumi jugoslovenske rok i pop muzike (YU 100: The Best albums of Yugoslav pop and rock music), published in 1998, features two albums by the band: S' vetrom uz lice (ranked No. 26) and Katarina II (album) (ranked No. 68). The list of 100 greatest Yugoslav album, published by Croatian edition of Rolling Stone in 2015, features three Ekatarina Velika albums: S' vetrom uz lice (ranked No. 10) and Katarina II (ranked No. 29) and Ekatarina Velika (ranked No. 44). In 1987, in YU legende uživo (YU Legends Live), a special publication by Rock magazine, 19LIVE86 was pronounced one of 12 best Yugoslav live albums.

The Rock Express Top 100 Yugoslav Rock Songs of All Times list, published in 2000, featured five songs by Ekatarina Velika: "Krug" (polled No.3), "Par godina za nas" (polled No.11), "Ti si sav moj bol" (polled No.41), "Zemlja" (polled No.54) and "7 dana" (polled No.86). In November 2006, "Par godina za nas" was polled the Best Yugoslav Popular Music Song on the B92 Top 100 Domestic Songs list. In 2011, the songs "Krug" and "Par godina za nas" were polled, by the listeners of Radio 202, two of 60 greatest songs released by PGP-RTB/PGP-RTS during the sixty years of the label's existence.

The lyrics of 15 songs by the band were featured in Petar Janjatović's book Pesme bratstva, detinjstva & potomstva: Antologija ex YU rok poezije 1967 - 2007 (Songs of Brotherhood, Childhood & Offspring: Anthology of Ex YU Rock Poetry 1967 - 2007).

In July 2011, the hardscape area in front of the Belgrade Youth Center was named the Milan Mladenović Place. In 2012, a street in Zagreb, Milan Mladenović's city of birth, was named after him.

In 2016, Serbian weekly news magazine Nedeljnik pronounced Milan Mladenović one of 100 people that changed Serbia forever.

== Members ==
- Milan Mladenović — vocals, guitar (February 1982 - summer 1994) (died 1994)
- Dragomir Mihajlović "Gagi" — guitar (February 1982 - sometime in 1984)
- Zoran Radomirović "Švaba" — bass guitar (February 1982 - late 1982)
- Dušan Dejanović — drums (February 1982 - late 1982) (died 2000)
- Margita Stefanović "Magi" - keyboards, backing vocals (late 1982 - summer 1994) (died 2002)
- Branko Kuštrin "Mango" — drums (late 1982 - early 1983)
- Bojan Pečar — bass guitar (early 1983 - early 1990) (died 1998)
- Ivan Vdović "VD" — drums (early 1983 - fall 1984) (died 1992)
- Ivan Fece "Firchie" — drums (fall 1984 - late 1985), (early 1988 - May 1988)
- Ivan Ranković "Raka" — drums (late 1985 - early 1987)
- Srđan Todorović "Žika" — drums (early 1987 - early 1988), (May 1988 - early 1990)
- Marko Milivojević — drums (early 1990 - summer 1994)
- Miško Petrović "Plavi" — bass guitar (early 1990 - spring 1991)
- Dušan Petrović — bass guitar (spring 1991 - fall 1991)
- Bata Božanić — bass guitar (spring 1991 - fall 1991)
- Dragiša Uskoković "Ćima" — bass guitar (fall 1991 - late 1993)
- Boško Stanojević "Bole" — bass guitar (summer 1994)

== Discography ==
- Katarina II (1984)
- Ekatarina Velika (1985)
- S' vetrom uz lice (1986)
- Ljubav (1987)
- Samo par godina za nas (1989)
- Dum Dum (1991)
- Neko nas posmatra (1993)
