= Šarlo Akrobata =

Serbian new wave/post-punk band

Šarlo Akrobata Шарло Акробата
- Šarlo Akrobata in 1980: Milan Mladenović, Dušan Kojić, and Ivan Vdović.

Background information
- Origin: Belgrade, SR Serbia, SFR Yugoslavia
- Genres: New wave; art punk; reggae fusion; post-punk; dub; experimental
- Years active: 1980–1981
- Labels: Jugoton; Croatia Records
- Spinoffs: Katarina II; Disciplina Kičme
- Spinoff of: Limunovo Drvo
- Past members: Milan Mladenović; Dušan Kojić; Ivan Vdović

Šarlo Akrobata (Serbian Cyrillic: Шарло Акробата, lit. 'Charlot the Acrobat') were a Serbian new wave/post-punk band from Belgrade. Short-lived but extremely influential, in addition to being one of the most important acts of the Yugoslav new wave scene, the three piece left an indelible mark on the entire music scene of former Yugoslavia.

Spawning from the progressive/hard rock group Limunovo Drvo (Serbian Cyrillic: Лимуново Дрво, lit. 'Lemon Tree'), founded in 1977 by guitarist and vocalist Milan Mladenović and guitarist Dragomir "Gagi" Mihajlović, after several lineup changes, moved towards new wave music, with the arrival of bassist and vocalist Dušan "Koja" Kojić and drummer Ivan "Vd" Vdović. After performing as an opening act for Pankrti in April 1980, Mihajlović left the band and the remaining three members changed their name to Šarlo Akrobata, after a Yugoslav nickname for Charlie Chaplin's character the Tramp. Subsequently, the trio recorded four tracks which were released on the 1981 compilation album Paket aranžman, now considered to be one of the most influential releases in the history of former Yugoslav rock music. During 1981, the band released their debut album Bistriji ili tuplji čovek biva kad..., after which, owing to irreconcilable differences between the band members, the band ceased to exist. The album received critical recognition and is regarded as one of the most notable albums of former Yugoslav rock music.

After the band disbandment, Mladenović with Vdović and Mihajlović formed Katarina II, which changed its name to Ekatarina Velika after the departure of the latter two, and Kojić formed Disciplina Kičme, changing its name to Disciplin A Kitschme in 1995. In 1992, Vdović died of AIDS, followed by Milan Mladenović's death from pancreatic cancer in 1994.

== History ==
=== Background: Limunovo Drvo ===
In 1978, Milan Mladenović (guitar, vocals) and Gagi Mihajlović (guitar) formed the progressive/hard rock band Limunovo Drvo, with bassist Goran "Maksa" Kovinčić and drummer Dušan "Džindžer" Dejanović. The lineup did not last long and the band experienced frequent personnel changes, including bassist Mikica Stefanović as well as Kovinčić's and Dejanović's respective returns. Despite never achieving stable lineup, the band still managed to string together a bit of an active presence on Belgrade's underground music scene, performing at the Žarkovo and Železnik guitar festivals, at Novi Beograd's Blok 45, the Belgrade Youth Center, as well as staging two solo concerts at the SKC. During this period, the band also recorded a few demo tracks at the famous JM Sound Studio in Zagreb owned by Janko "Truli" Mlinarić and Petko Kantardijev.

Still, Limunovo Drvo never managed to put out an official release although they were reportedly close to recording an album for Suzy Records, only to break apart before that could be realized. Songs performed by Limunovo Drvo include "Da li se sećate?" ("Do you remember?", "Sedmi krug" ("The Seventh Circle", "Oko moje glave" ("All Around My Head"), "Limunovo drvo" ("The Lemon Tree"), "Ne veruj" ("Do Not Believe") and "Gubitak (Nešto u nama)" ("The Loss (Something Within Us)").

At the end of Mladenović's and Mihajlović's creative wits, the two were joined by Dušan "Koja" Kojić (bass, vocals) — who had previously played with a number of underground Belgrade bands in addition to moving in alternative and punk circles gathered around the SKC where he used to conduct public forum debates related to new wave music — as well as Ivan Vdović "VD" (drums, backing vocals), a drummer with a background in jazz music who performed with numerous Belgrade bands including BG5 and Suncokret. Furthermore, Kojić and Mladenović had previously played in a band Izvan Vremena, having their first performance in 1978. The addition of a new rhythm section brought a change in their musical orientations through adopting a new musical direction inspired by the emerging punk rock and new wave scenes. Upon his arrival in Limunovo Drvo, Kojić also brought along his and Milan's mutual friend Nenad "Kele" Krasavac who became the band's unofficial manager. In April 1980, the new Limunovo Drvo lineup opened for Pankrti at Belgrade SKC, performing a set of new and rearranged older songs, after which guitarist Mihajlović decided to leave the band and the remaining members decided to continue working as a trio, changing the name to Šarlo Akrobata.

In June 1980, the band performed at a series of multiple acts free concerts, mostly featuring the newly formed new wave and punk bands, organized at the Belgrade SKC under the supervision of Nebojša Pajkić, after which, Šarlo Akrobata (labeled as Akrobata Šarlo), along with Električni Orgazam and Idoli were recognized by the Džuboks critic Momčilo Rajin as "one of the most exciting new acts".". Rajin stated that Vdović's drum playing style was "reminiscent of Stewart Copeland of The Police", Kojić bass playing as "a true example of simplicity and bareness to the essence of playing his instrument", and Mladenović as "matured into a true band leader". Soon after, the three bands were labeled by the music critics as the core of the emerging scene, consisting of the newly formed Belgrade punk rock and new wave bands centered on SKC, which they called the "Belgrade Alternative Scene" or "BAS". During November, with the performance of the song "Ona se budi" the band competed at Subotica Festival Omladina, the event where the representatives of both the Belgrade and Zagreb new wave scene had met for the first time, claiming second jury prize behind Film.

=== Paket aranžman ===
By the Subotica performance, during autumn 1980, the band had already made their first recordings, the songs "Ona se budi" ("She is Rousing"), "Oko moje glave" ("All Around My Head"), "Niko kao ja" ("No One Like Me") and "Mali čovek" ("Little Man") at the Belgrade Druga Maca studio, owned by the former Indexi keyboard player Enco Lesić, who had also made recordings of the other two "BAS" bands, Idoli and Električni Orgazam. Eventually, in coordination with Lesić and Idoli manager Dragan Papić, the Jugoton executive editor Siniša Škarica came up with an idea of releasing the recordings of three bands in a compilation album, rather than releasing separate maxi singles. During the recording sessions of the three bands, the Druga Maca studio was visited by the young PGP RTB television directors, Boris Miljković and Branimir Dimitrijević "Tucko", who were at the time working together on the Rokenroler (Rockenroller) television show, and in the following couple of weeks, they recorded several music videos for the songs of the three bands, all featuring the same style: a minimalist barren white chroma key scenery surrounding the band members.

The recorded music videos, including the video for the song "Niko kao ja", appeared in the third episode of the Rokenroler show, originally broadcast on New Year's Eve 1981 on R, being the debut television appearance of the three Belgrade new wave acts, as well as the first presentation of the Belgrade new wave bands to a nationwide audience outside. The show became the most notable of all the Rokenroler episodes as well as the most notable work of the two directors. The show also marked one of the first serious attempts of introducing the mainstream music video in Yugoslav media. Following the show's broadcast, in January 1981, The Džuboks magazine journalist Nebojša Mirčetović, in the text "The Ultimate Breakup with the Apathetic Seventies", in the context of the unreleased material promoted by the music videos, stated that the show marked the "beginning of a rainbow at the end of which we would find a jar full of beautiful music waiting for the record labels to release it". During following month, in the same magazine, Ivica Vdović was polled by the readers as the 10th best drummer, and Dušan Kojić as the 9th best bassist of the year 1980.

Despite the intended release during the late-1980, due to the lack of vinyl material, the omnibus compilation album featuring the debut recordings of Šarlo Akrobata, along with the recordings of Električni Orgazam and Idoli, Paket aranžman (Package Deal), was released in February 1981 by Jugoton. Despite the fact that initially all three bands were not content with the release itself, especially the album production, owing to the technical limitations of the studio itself, the half-year delay during which the three bands had evolved musically, the release proved to be one of the most influential albums in the history of Yugoslav rock music. The album received positive critical reaction, with the Džuboks magazine critic Momčilo Rajin, in his review of the album, comparing the release with notability of the Grupa 220, Bijelo Dugme, Prljavo Kazalište and Pankrti debut album releases. The album was not a commercial success, initially being sold in about 10.000 copies with the 20.000 being sold with the subsequent reissues. However, the songs from the release, including "Ona se budi" and "Niko kao ja", were listed on the greatest Yugoslav rock songs lists on several occasions.

The release of Paket aranžman was soon followed by the release of the Miša Radivojević movie Dečko koji obećava (Promising Boy), for which the band recorded three songs, with Goran Vejvoda on guitar and the actor Aleksandar Berček on lead vocals, which appeared on the movie soundtrack. The recorded songs, for which the music was written by Kojić and the lyrics by the screenplay writer Nebojša Pajkić, were performed in the movie by the fictional musical group VIS Dobri Dečaci (The Good Boys), with Kojić acting the guitar player role, Vdović the drummer role and Berček the lead vocalist and film's starring role. The songs "Slobodan" (a popular Serbian name, literally means "free"), "Balada o tvrdim grudima" ("The Ballad of Hard Breasts") and "Depresija" ("Depression), however, were never officially released. In March of the same year, Šarlo Akrobata participated the Pozdrav iz Beograda (Greetings from Belgrade) concert organized in Zagreb as a promotion of the Belgrade new wave scene, and a live promotion of Paket aranžman, on which the band also promoted their debut single "Mali čovek", with "Ona se budi" as the single B-side, released prior to the event.

=== Bistriji ili tuplji čovek biva kad... ===
In April 1981, the band entered the studio in order to record their debut studio album, which was intended to be released through PGP RTB. However, during the recording sessions at the PGP RTB Studio 5, the musical editors of the record label, the composer Aleksandar Pilipenko and Bojan Hreljac, formerly the bassist of Korni Grupa, after visiting the studio during the recording of one of the experimental tracks, the label decided to drop the release. Even though the original band's musical directions were based on a combination of punk rock and white reggae music, the outcome of the album recording sessions proved turned out to be as experimental as possible, with the British new wave styles being combined with reggae, punk sound backed with dub effects. The recording sessions were based on a kind of a system where Mladenović and Kojić would bring fresh raw ideas and Vdović would modify and shape them. Mladenović was into poetic and melodic aspect of the whole thing while Kojić, inspired by Jimi Hendrix style of playing, was turned to minimal lyrics and aggressive music which can be recognized on different tracks on the album and their work in general.

Eventually, in July 1981, after purchasing the recordings from PGP RTB, the debut album Bistriji ili tuplji čovek biva kad... (Brighter or Dumber a Man Gets When...), was released by Jugoton. The material featured guest appearances by Goran Vejvoda, Gagi Mihajlović, Jurij Novoselić "Kuzma" from the band Film and Dejan Kostić from Grupa I. The producer of the album was signed as Akpiđoto (misspelled on the album cover as Aktiđoto) which represents a combination of names of the real producers: Akrobata (the band), Pile (the nickname of Mile Miletić), Đorđe (Đorđe Petrović) and Toni (Toni Jurij, a recording engineer from Ljubljana who was an expert on dub techniques). The album front cover was designed by the band themselves with Goran Vejvoda (who also designed the Paket aranžman cover), the front cover featuring the band with their backs turned and facing a boy to create a kind of a notion of a mirror, with the band members also contributing with their own drawings on the inner sleeve: Mladenović's drawing of his girlfriend, Kojić drew a two scene caricature and added the text from Politikin Zabavnik from an article about the "acrobatic ladles" to the Vdović's drawing.

The title of the album was taken from the Vasa Pelagić book Narodni učitelj (The Folk Teacher), from which the song lyrics for the highly experimental track "Pazite na decu I" ("Take Care Of The Children I") were also taken. Beside the experimental "Pazite na decu I" and "Ljubavna pesma", the album featured the rearranged songs from the Limunovo Drvo period, along with the new material, and the entire written material and arrangements were credited to Šarlo Akrobata, rather than the individual band members themselves. However, the fact that the album did not feature the hit songs from Paket aranžman like "Ona se budi" or "Niko kao ja", which the band considered as repetition of old material, affected the album and sales, with the album being sold in about 10.000 copies without another repressing by Jugoton. Like with the case of Paket aranžman, despite not being commercially successful, the album proved to be one of the most significant albums released in the history of Yugoslav rock music, according to a number of musicians and critics, and was also featured on the greatest Yugoslav rock albums list.

=== Album promotion and breakup ===
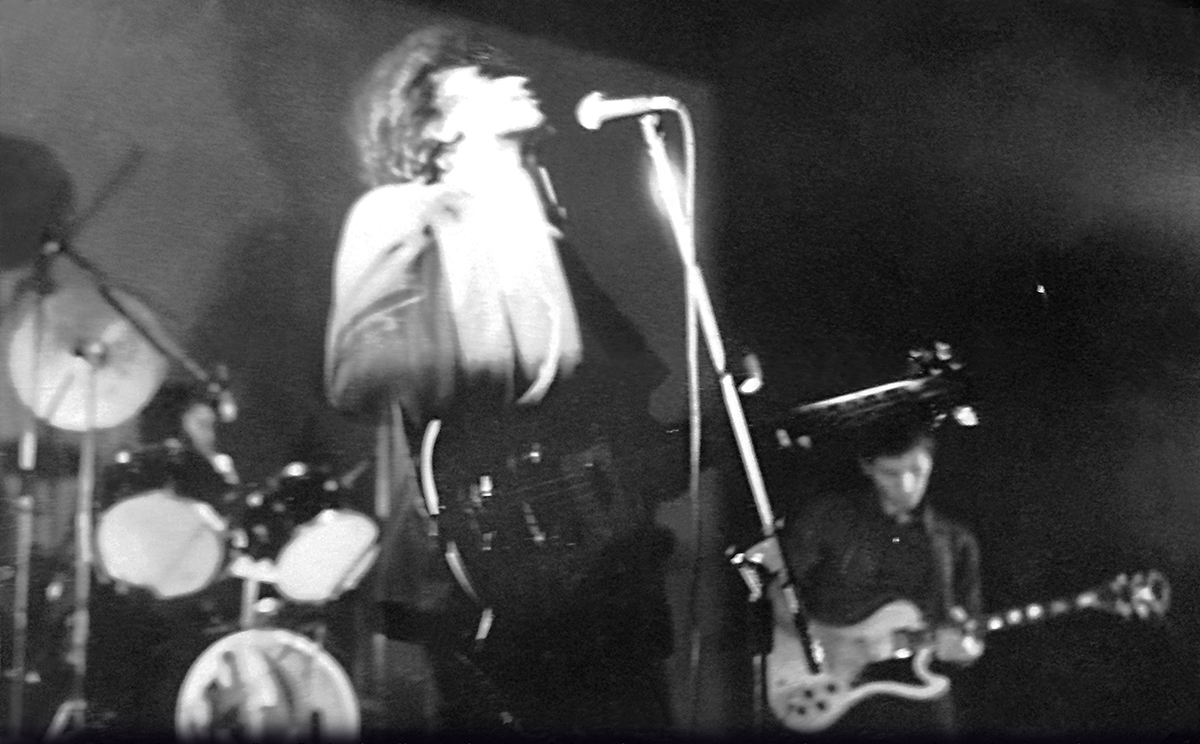
Šarlo Akrobata performing in Poznań, Poland in October 1981

Following the album recording sessions on 15 May 1981 with the Croatian new wave band Haustor, the band performed as an opening act for the Gang of Four at the Music Biennale Zagreb festival. It was intended that both bands were to open the Gang of Four concert in Ljubljana, but the performance was canceled. At that time, the professional and, consequently, private relations within the group had not been very well among its members, mostly because of the different views on the future directions of the band. Vdović insisted on bringing in the band Goran Vejvoda and possibly even Vejvoda's girlfriend at the time Dragana Šarić, both of which the members of his side project Announda Rouge. Mladenović was mostly receptive to the idea, also wanted to add a keyboard player and Vejvoda was one of the rare young musicians in Belgrade at the time who owned a Casio VL-2 synthesizer, whereas Kojić vehemently objected to it, feeling the current lineup still had much more to offer. Kojić would later state, in the 2006 documentary about Ekatarina Velika, Kao da je bilo nekad, that the normal relations and communication in Šarlo Akrobata lasted only about six months.

According to Kojić, the band was also reluctant to promote the album with much touring as the writing had already been on the wall since the trio barely tolerated each other at this point, knowing for some time they would soon split apart. The band were also to release a new double A-side single "Bes" ("Anger") / "Prevaren" ("Fooled"), the former being an original version of the dub remix featured on the debut album and the latter being a power pop track version of a Limunovo Drvo track, which were recorded during the album recording sessions, but it was never released. In the Autumn of 1981, they got the "Smeli cvet" award for music by Socialistic Youth Of Yugoslavia, after which the band embarked on a previously booked tour of Poland (joint concert with the band Sten & Soc, Poznań, October 18, 1981), during which they also had an unplanned jam improvising session with some of the British jazz performers at the Warsaw jazz festival. Upon returning to Yugoslavia, the band performed at a farewell show Ljubljana in October 1981, which, along with the Music Biennale Zagreb festival performance, proved to be the highest attending Šarlo Akrobata concert (circa 1.000 people), after which they disbanded.

=== Post-breakup ===
By the time Šarlo Akrobata disbanded, Kojić had already had several rehearsals with the band's manager Nenad Krasavac "Kele", who was also the drummer of the Belgrade punk rock band Urbana Gerila, as a duo under the name of Disciplina Kičme, featuring himself on bass guitar and Krasavac on drums. Following the disbandment, Milan Mladenović with Gagi Mihajlović on guitar, Dušan Dejanović on drums, and Zoran "Švaba" Radomirović on bass guitar, formed the band Katarina II, soon to be joined by the keyboard player Margita Stefanović. During the following year, Katarina II drummer Dušan Dejanović left the band in order to join Disciplina Kičme, and was replaced by Ivica Vdović "VD". In 1983, Disciplina Kičme with the drummer Srđan Todorović released their debut album Sviđa mi se da ti ne bude prijatno (I Find Your Discomfort Appealing), featuring the tracks "Mozak" ("Brain") and "Pečati" ("Stamps"), originally performed by Šarlo Akrobata, but never officially released. The following year, Katarina II released their debut album Katarina II, after which both Mihajlović and Vdović left the band and the rest of the lineup changed the name to Ekatarina Velika.

Both Disciplina Kičme and Ekatarina Velika would release a series of critically and moderately commercially successful albums throughout the 1980s. The rivalry between the two bands heated up with the Disciplina Kičme drummer Srđan Todorović joining Ekatarina Velika in 1987. During the same year, Disciplina Kičme released the EP Dečija pesma (Children Song), featuring six different versions of the title track, which featured the lyrics "Nije dobro Bijelo Dugme; Nije dobra Katarina; Šta je dobro; Šta nam treba; Kičme, Kičme Disciplina") ("Bijelo Dugme is no good; And neither is Katarina; What is good?; What we need?; Kičme, Kičme Disciplina"). One of the versions featured the guest appearance by Vdović, who had been working with Du Du A and Heroji after leaving Katarina II, on rhythm machine. In 1989, Vdović formed the band DDT with the former Urbana Gerila member Srđan Marković "Đile" (vocals) and former Profili Profili member Miodrag Stojanović "Čeza" (rhythm machine). On 23 September 1992 Ivan Vdović, being the first officially registered HIV positive person in former Yugoslavia, died of AIDS at the age of 32.

In 1991, Jugoton rereleased Paket aranžman on compact disc, becoming one of the first CD releases in former Yugoslavia. The following year, with the outbreak of the Yugoslav wars, Mladenović participated the antiwar project Rimtutituki, and Kojić moved to London where, after performing in various bands, revived Discpilina Kičme with an alternative band name Disciplin A Kitschme, releasing several albums, featuring the rerecorded English language versions of Disciplina Kičme songs along with new material, and achieved a cult status. After releasing two albums with Ekatarina Velika, in 1994, Mladenović moved to Brazil where, with his friend and musical collaborator, Mitar Subotić, as Angel's Breath, released their eponymous album, recorded with a lineup of Brazilian musicians. Upon his return, on 24 August 1994, Ekatarina Velika played what would turn out to be their last show at the Pjesma Mediterana festival in Budva, as the next day Mladenović was held in a hospital, and was diagnosed with pancreatic cancer. On 5 November 1994 Milan Mladenović died in Belgrade at the age of 36.

Kojić continued performing with the London lineup of Disciplin A Kitschme until 2003 when he moved back to Belgrade. In 2002, the actress and director Sonja Savić recorded an independent documentary movie Šarlo te gleda (Charlot is Watching You), dedicated to the late Šarlo Akrobata drummer Ivan Vdović, which covered the story of Šarlo Akrobata and other bands from the Belgrade scene of the 1980s. The following year, Igor Mirković released a book and directed a movie on the entire former Yugoslav new wave scene entitled Sretno dijete (Happy Child), which featured the story on Šarlo Akrobata, however, Kojić refused to participate in the film, dissatisfied with the fact that bands like Bijelo Dugme, a progressive rock band which switched to playing new wave music with the genre popularity, were included in the storyline. In 2005, Kojić reformed a new Belgrade lineup of Disciplin A Kitschme and resumed discography and touring activities. In 2007, Croatia Records, the successor of Jugoton, released a box set entitled Paket Aranžman featuring a remastered edition of the album, packed with the Šarlo Akrobata and Električni orgazam debut albums.

== Musical style ==
During the progressive/hard rock period of Limunovo Drvo, Milan Mladenović had already discovered the British new wave bands XTC and The Stranglers, a musical preference he discovered to be sharing with Dušan Kojić "Koja", upon whose arrival in Limunovo Drvo, the band moved towards punk rock and new wave. Another new arrival which influenced the new musical orientation of Limunovo Drvo was the drummer Ivica Vdović "VD", who was more of a jazz musical background than rock, being a fan of jazz, jazz fusion, swing and be-bop, and Frank Zappa. During the earliest period of Šarlo Akrobata, the band sounded like a punk rock band rather than a new wave band, which changed with their ambition for a more minimal instrumentation. During this second period, the band embraced reggae, ska and punk funk, with the Gang of Four debut album Entertainment! and Joe Jackson debut Look Sharp! being a major influence, as documented on the compilation album Paket aranžman. In an interview, Kojić also listed James Chance and the Contortions, The Pop Group, Public Image Limited, Miles Davis and Jimi Hendrix among the band favorites.

After the Paket aranžman period, the band moved towards making further experimentation which was marked as an "organized chaos" by Vdović, in which Vdović's playing open forms allowed the connection of Kojić's raw and aggressive treatment of the bass guitar as a solo instrument and Mladenović melodic guitar and vocal style. Mladenović would later state that he was the force in the band which could organize in a coherent whole the sounds coming from the unrestrained bass and drums, part of which owing to the necessity to play and sing most of the time, which affected his playing style. This period was documented on the band's debut and only studio album Bistriji ili tuplji čovek biva kad.... Following the debut track on the album, the Stranglers and Magazine-influenced waltz intro "Šarlo je nežan", the album's second track "Pazite na decu" featured the band members unexpectedly entering the studio with a few associates and switching their instruments, with Mladenović on drums and vocals, Vdović playing guitar, Kojić playing the goblet drum and shouting, Dejan Kostić of Du Du A on bass, and Goran Vejvoda on guitar.

Another highly experimental track was "Ljubavna pesma" which was an improvisation recorded in a single take, the practice also used in the track "Čovek", featuring the exclamation "Družino" ("Camaradery") as a tribute to the band Buldožer, in which the band wanted to play as fast as possible, resulting in the most aggressive track on the album. The album also featured the rearranged songs from the Limunovo Drvo period, "Fenomen", "Sad se jasno vidi", "Rano izjutra", which were rearranged to a raw punk sound, and the melodic "Samo ponekad", which featured an oriental solo at the end of the track. Their fondness for ska music was continued on the release with the track "O, O, O", featuring a guest saxophone solo by Jurij Novoselić "Kuzma" from the band Film. "O, O, O" featured dub music influences which were also found in the tracks "Bes" and "Problem", the latter featuring effects made by the collision of microphones, the placing of nylon bags over the microphones and stopping the tapes with an intense echo. The album also featured the power pop songs "Ja želim jako" and "Pazite na decu II" influenced by the British power pop scene.

== Legacy ==
Šarlo Akrobata songs have been covered by various artists. In 1995, the Slovenian group 2227 recorded the single "Šarlo budi nežan" ("Šarlo, Be Gentle") as a tribute to the band. In 1998, the Serbian punk rock band Džukele performed live a cover version of the song "Fenomen" ("Phenomenon"), released on the Punk You All various artists compilation. In 1999, the Serbian punk rock band Plejboj, on the various artists cover album Korak napred 2 koraka nazad (A Step Forward 2 Steps Backwards), recorded a cover version of the song "Sad se jasno vidi" ("Now It Is Clearly Visible"). In 2009, the Serbian actor and musician Nikola Pejaković "Kolja" covered the song "Samo ponekad" and released it as a digital download single for his second studio album Kolja. In 2013, Serbian guitarist Miroslav Tadić recorded an instrumental version of "Ona se budi" on his album Mirina.

In 2002, on the Milan Mladenović tribute album Kao da je bilo nekad... (Posvećeno Milanu Mladenoviću) (As If It Had Happened Sometime... (Dedicated To Milan Mladenović)) appeared several covers of Šarlo Akrobata songs. The Serbian punk rock band Novembar recorded a cover version of the song "O, o, o", former Haustor frontman Darko Rundek covered the song "Ona se budi", and the alternative rock band VROOM covered the song "Problem". In 2003, on the Milan Mladenović tribute concert in Zagreb, the Električni Orgazam frontman Srđan Gojković performed the songs "Fenomen", "Samo ponekad" ("Just Occasionally") and "O, o, o", all of which appeared on the live Milan Mladenović tribute album Jako dobar tatoo!.

In 1998, in the book YU 100: najbolji albumi jugoslovenske rok i pop muzike (YU 100: The Best Albums Of Yugoslav Pop And Rock Music), the album Bistriji ili tuplji čovek biva kad... was ranked No. 11. In the same book Paket aranžman appeared on the second place. In 2015, Bistiriji ili tuplji čovek biva kad... was pronounced the second on the list of 100 greatest Yugoslav album, published by Croatian edition of Rolling Stone. On the same list, Paket aranžman was ranked No. 38.

The Rock Express Top 100 Yugoslav Rock Songs of All Times list, published in 2000, featured two songs by Šarlo Akrobata, "Niko kao ja" (polled No.8) and "Ona se budi" (polled No.62). In 2006, on the B92 Top 100 Domestic Songs list polled by the listeners of Radio B92, the song "Ona se budi" appeared on the fifth place and the song "Niko kao ja" appeared on the ninth place.

The lyrics of 6 songs by the band (5 written by Mladenović and 1 written by Kojić) were featured in Petar Janjatović's book Pesme bratstva, detinjstva & potomstva: Antologija ex YU rok poezije 1967 - 2007 (Songs of Brotherhood, Childhood & Offspring: Anthology of Ex YU Rock Poetry 1967 - 2007).

== Members ==
Former members

- Milan Mladenović – guitar, vocals (April 1980 - October 1981)
- Dušan Kojić "Koja" – bass guitar, vocals (April 1980 - October 1981)
- Ivan Vdović "VD" – drums, backing vocals (April 1980 - October 1981)
- Dragomir Mihajlović "Gagi" – guitar (April 1980)

Note: Dragomir Mihajlović is tentatively listed here as a band member, since the April 1980 performance of Limunovo Drvo opening for Pankrti was regarded by the band as their first performance, even though the band got the name Šarlo Akrobata immediately after the performance.

== Discography ==
Studio albums

- Bistriji ili tuplji čovek biva kad... (1981)
