= Dragomir Mihajlović =

- Also known as: Gagi
- Born: 1960 (age 65–66); Belgrade, PR Serbia, FPR Yugoslavia
- Genres: Progressive rock, new wave, punk rock, post-punk (early), rock (later)
- Instruments: guitar
- Years active: 1978 – present

Dragomir "Gagi" Mihajlović (Serbian Cyrillic: Драгомир Михајловић "Гаги") is a Serbian rock guitarist.

== Musical career ==
Mihajlović started his career as a guitarist in a progressive rock group Limunovo Drvo, which, formed in 1978 by himself and Milan Mladenović (guitar, vocals), after performing for two years moved towards new wave, with the arrival of Dušan Kojić "Koja" (bass, vocals) and Ivan Vdović "VD" (drums, backing vocals). In April 1980, Limunovo Drvo opened for Pankrti at Belgrade SKC. After the performance, Mihajlović left the band the rest decided to change the name to Šarlo Akrobata. The following year Mihajlović appeared as guest on their debut studio album Bistriji ili tuplji čovek biva kad... (Brighter or Dumber a Man Gets When...).

After the Šarlo Akrobata disbandment, with his former bandmate Milan Mladenović he formed Katarina II. Having released their debut eponymous album, on which he appeared as a co-author of both music and song lyrics, he left the band. After Katarina II he collaborated with Vlada Divljan on the Šest dana juna (Six Days of June) soundtrack and Nebojša Krstić and Srđan Šaper album Poslednja mladost u Jugoslaviji (The Last Youth in Yugoslavia) before moving to the United States where he currently resides. In the meantime, in 1983, he made a guest appearance on the Du Du A debut album Primitivni ples (Primitive dance).

In 2002, he appeared on the Vlada Divljan cover version of the Katarina II song "Radostan dan" ("A Joyful Day") which appeared on the Milan Mladenović tribute album Kao da je bilo nekad... (Posvećeno Milanu Mladenoviću) [As If It Had Happened Sometime... (Dedicated To Milan Mladenović)]. In 2010 he appeared as guest on the Električni Orgazam album To što vidiš to i jeste (What You See Is What You Get) on the tracks "Pokaži mi (kakav je tvoj grad)" ("Show Me (What Your Town Is Like") and "Nikad ne znam" ("I Never Know").

== Discography ==
=== With Katarina II ===
- Katarina II (1984)
- The Best Of Ekatarina (1995) - Ekatarina Velika compilation album featuring Katarina II songs
- Ekatarina Velika (2004) - a double compilation album featuring remastered Katarina II and Ekatarina Velika albums released by ZKP RTVL

=== Guest appearances ===
- Bistriji ili tuplji čovek biva kad... (Šarlo Akrobata; 1981)
- "Les Chansones Populaires" - Električni Orgazam 1983
- Primitivni ples (Du Du A; 1983)
- Šest dana juna (Idoli; 1985)
- Poslednja mladost u Jugoslaviji (Krstić & Šaper; 1987)
- Kao da je bilo nekad... (Posvećeno Milanu Mladenoviću) (various artists, with Vlada Divljan; 2002)
- To što vidiš to i jeste (Električni Orgazam;2010)
