= Karlowy Vary =

- Origin: Zagreb, SR Croatia, SFR Yugoslavia
- Genres: New wave, post-punk
- Years active: 1981 - 1986
- Labels: PGP
- Past members: Tomo in der Muhlen; Varja Orlić; Margita Stefanović; Igor Zambelli Slojmun; Milan Manojlović Mance; Dražen Pencel Pink; Stanko Juzbašić; Zdravko Ostojić Mark; Dragan Simenovski; Rista Ibrić

Karlowy Vary was a Croatian and Yugoslav underground post-punk band from Zagreb active in the 1980s all over former Yugoslavia. The first name of the band was "Korowa Bar", and the first singer was Igor Zambelli Slojmun who was replaced with Milan Manojlović Mance, but only after Varja Orlić, dancer and performer entered the bend they got a shape. Her deep almost masculine voice and exceptional movement on the stage made the band famous in these years.

They planned to release three albums. The first recordings of the band, named only "Demo 1982", planned to be part of the compilation on which several post-punk or new wave bands (beside Korowa Bar, Sexa and Dorian Gray (band)) should be presented. "Demo 1982" was recorded in the year 1982 at Zagreb Radio and TV studio as a music project of famous Croatian music critic Dražen Vrdoljak. Unfortunately the band Dorian Gray (band) canceled and the whole project failed. The second album "Haotika" was also not released due to various reasons but the demo tapes of both albums are preserved. The third was released by PGP RTB, named La Femme. Tomo in der Muhlen was the composer, producer and band leader.

Members:

- Varja Orlic - vocals
- Igor Zambelli Slojmun - vocals
- Milan Manojlović Mance - vocals
- Tomo in der Muhlen - guitars, Arp Avatar, Roland TR808
- Margita Stefanović - keyboards, suptractive analog syntisizer (Oberheim OB-8)
- Hrvoje Piletic - Pile - Guitars
- Stanko Juzbašić - programmer of Oberheim OB-8
- Dražen Pencel Pink - bass
- Zdravko Ostojić Mark - drums
- Dragan Simenovski - drums
- Rista Ibrić (Rista Al'Ibro) - violin
