= S' vetrom uz lice =

S vetrom uz lice

Studio album by Ekatarina Velika
- Released: 1986
- Recorded: February 1986
- Studios: SIM studio, Zagreb
- Genres: Rock, post-punk
- Label: ZKP RTLJ
- Producers: Dragan Čačinović, Ekarterina Velika

Ekatarina Velika chronology
| Ekatarina Velika (1985) | S vetrom uz lice (1986) | 19LIVE86 (1987) |

S vetrom uz lice (English: With The Wind Against Our Faces) is the third studio album by the Serbian rock band Ekatarina Velika, released in 1986. With this album the group reached a wider audience, and it is considered to be their commercial breakthrough. The new drummer, replacing Ivan "Firchie" Fece, was Ivan "Raka" Ranković (ex. Tvrdo srce i velike uši). The album was recorded and mixed at SIM studio in Zagreb and produced by Dragan Čačinović with the band.

In 2006 "Ti si sav moj bol" was ranked #3 on the B92 Top 100 Domestic Songs list.

== Track listing ==
All music is composed by Ekaterina Velika, arrangements by Ekatarina Velika.

| No. | Title | Lyrics | Length |
|---|---|---|---|
| 1. | "Budi sam na ulici (Be Alone In The Street)" | Milan Mladenović | 5:10 |
| 2. | "Ti si sav moj bol (You Are All My Pain)" | Milan Mladenović | 3:54 |
| 3. | "Kao da je bilo nekad (Like It Was Once)" | Milan Mladenović | 4:28 |
| 4. | "Umorna pesma (Tired song)" | Milan Mladenović | 4:38 |
| 5. | "Novac u rukama (Money In Hands)" | Milan Mladenović | 3:43 |
| 6. | "Sarajevo (Sarajevo)" | Milan Mladenović | 2:52 |
| 7. | "Stvaran svet oko mene (Real World Around Me)" | Milan Mladenović | 2:46 |
| 8. | "Soba (The Room)" | Milan Mladenović | 4:27 |
| 9. | "Grad (City)" | Milan Mladenović, Margita Stefanović, Bojan Pečar | 4:09 |

== Personnel ==
- Milan Mladenović – vocals, guitar
- Margita Stefanović – piano, keyboards, backing vocals
- Bojan Pečar – bass
- Ivan "Raka" Ranković – drums
