= Du Du A =

Serbian alternative rock band

- Du Du A in 1982: Zoran Zagorčić (left) and Dejan Kostić (right)

Background information
- Also known as: Du-Du-A; Du Du Ah
- Origin: Belgrade, Serbia
- Genres: New wave; post-punk; alternative rock; synth-pop; funk; reggae; rap; electronic music
- Years active: 1981–2013
- Labels: PGP-RTB, Jugoton, Good Taste Records, Discom
- Past members: Dejan Kostić; Vuk Vujačić; Zoran Zagorčić; Goran Vejvoda; Dejan Stanisavljević; Goran Vujović; Vesna Zafirović; Vlada Funtek; Andrej Jaćimović

Du Du A (Serbian Cyrillic: Ду Ду А) was a Serbian and Yugoslav alternative rock band formed in Belgrade in 1981.

Formed by Dejan Kostić (vocals, guitar, bass guitar) and Vuk Vujačić (saxophone), and soon joined by Zoran Zagorčić (vocals, keyboards), the band initially performed a combination of new wave, synth-pop, funk and reggae, also becoming pioneers of rap music in Yugoslavia with their early recordings. The band released their debut album Primitivni ples in 1982, gaining attention of the media and significant mainstream popularity. However, despite the band continuing to record and perform in various lineups during the following years, with the exception of a 7-inch single, they did not release any new material until the mid-1990s. In 1998, Zagorčić died of injuries he got in a car accident. In 2013, the band's leader Dejan Kostić also died of injuries from a car accident, Du Du A—although only officially active since the late 1990s—thus ceasing to exist.

== History ==
Du Du A was formed in 1981 by a former Grupa I member Dejan Kostić (vocals, guitar, bass guitar) and a former Innamorata and VIA Talas member Vuk Vujačić (saxophone). The two started writing material which featured a combination of funk, reggae and dance music. During the late 1981, the band was joined by former Ganeša (Ganesha) member Zoran Zagorčić (vocals, keyboards).

Their debut release was a 7-inch single with the songs "Ja Tarzan, ti Džejn" ("I Tarzan, You Jane") and "Afrikanac iz Beograda" ("African from Belgrade"), released in 1982. The single was one of the first Yugoslav records to feature a form of rap music. The band's debut album Primitivni ples (Primitive Dance) was produced by Dejan Kostić and released in 1982. By the time of the album release, Kostić and Zagorčić were the band's only official members, but Vujačić nevertheless took part in the album recording, alongside singer Bebi Dol, guitarist Goran Vejvoda, guitarist Dragomir Mihajlović "Gagi", guitarist Nebojša Antonijević "Anton" and keyboardist Saša Habić. The album presented the band's interest in a diverse range of at-the-time popular genres. The songs "Solar", "Ja ne bi, ne bi, ne bi" ("I Would Not, Would Not, Would Not") and "Strast" ("Passion"), the latter being a cover version of the blues standard "Fever", received significant airplay. The song "Znaš li devojku" ("Do You Know The Girl") featured the Yugoslav actor and singer of Kenyan origin Steve Hannington. After the album release, the band played extensively, holding a large number of concerts at the Belgrade's Students' Cultural Centre, with Vujačić on saxophone, Goran Vejvoda on guitar and Dejan Stanisavljević (formerly of Beograd) on keyboards.

During 1983 and 1984, the band was on hiatus because Kostić had been in Egypt, performing in Cairo clubs. On his return, the band resumed their activities. The new lineup featured, beside Kostić and Vujačić, Goran Vujović (bass guitar), Dejan Stanisavljević (piano), Vesna Zafirović (backing vocals), and Vlada Funtek (drums). The band continued to perform live and work in studio. However, with the exception of the single "Irie", released in 1985, they did not release any material until the mid-1990s. In 1994, an unplugged version of their song "Era Vulgaris" appeared on the various artists live album Bez struje (Unplugged), recorded on an unplugged festival held in Belgrade' Sava Centar.

The band's comeback album Ritual was released in 1996. The album featured only Kostić of the band's original members. Beside the material written by Kostić, the album also featured a cover version of the Stevie Wonder song "I Wish" with lyrics in Serbian entitled "San" ("A Dream"). Kostić recorded all the instruments on the album, with additional help from Miloš Pavlović (guitar, co-producer, co-author, sound technician), Nenad Jovanović (vocals), Srđan Marković "Đile" (of Supernaut, vocals), Aleksandar Jaćimović (saxophone) and Dejan Stanisavljević (piano). The album brought minor hits "Babylon" and "Lava".

Although officially active, in reality the band had been inactive since the late 1990s, the final lineup consisting of Dejan Kostić (vocals, guitar, bass guitar, sampler, rhythm machine) and Vesna Zafirović (vocals). On 7 July 2013, Kostić died from injuries in a car accident, Du Du A thus ceasing to exist.

In 2019, the record label Discom issued a compilation album entitled Du Du Archive 1984-1989, featuring 10 of the band's previously unreleased tracks, on a limited edition vinyl release.

=== Cooperations and other activities ===
Dejan Kostić played bass guitar on Šarlo Akrobata song "Pazite na decu" ("Take Care of the Children"), released on the band's only album Bistriji ili tuplji čovek biva kad... (Brighter or Dumber a Man Gets When...). He played guitar, bass guitar and percussion on Bebi Dol's single "Rudi" and album Ruže i krv (Roses and Blood).

Zoran Zagorčić graduated from the Belgrade Faculty of Medicine, after which he dedicated himself to alternative medicine and literary translation. Under the pseudonym Dudu Vudu he rapped on The Master Scratch Band 1984 album Degout. In the mid-1990s he performed with Električni Orgazam and took part in the recording of their album Zašto da ne! (Why Not!). He died on 3 November 1998 from injuries caused by a car accident. A year later, a book of his poems entitled Stakleno jezero (Glass Lake) was published. During the same year, the album Fetish was released, featuring a choice of songs he recorded but never presented to the public. All of the material on the album was written by Zagorčić, with the exception of English and Spanish language lyrics, written by Nina Živančević and Manuel Villanueva respectively. The album featured Dejan Kostić on guitar and Električni Orgazam member Zoran Radomirović "Švaba" on bass guitar, as well as Massimo Savić on vocals, Ivan Pajević on guitar and Bebi Dol on backing vocals.

== Legacy ==
The Serbian alternative rock band Svi na Pod! released a cover of the song "Afrikanac iz Beograda" on their 2011 album Prvi! (First!).

The song "Znaš li devojku" appeared on the 95th place of the B92 Top 100 Domestic Songs list polled by the listeners of Radio B92 in 2006.

== Discography ==
=== Studio albums ===
- Primitivni ples (1982)
- Ritual (1996)

=== Compilation albums ===
- Du Du Archive 1984-1989 (2019)

=== Singles ===
- "Ja Tarzan, ti Džejn" / "Afrikanac iz Beograda" (1982)
- "Irie" / "Romace" (1985)

=== Other appearances ===
- "Era Vulgaris" (Bez struje; 1994)

== See also ==
- New wave music in Yugoslavia
