= Bojan Pečar =

- Bojan Pečar

Background information
- Born: 22 March 1960; Belgrade, PR Serbia, FPR Yugoslavia
- Died: 13 October 1998 (aged 38) London, England, UK
- Genres: Rock, new wave
- Occupations: Bass player, songwriter
- Instruments: Bass guitar, guitar, keyboards, piano, violin, viola, percussion, vocals

Bojan Pečar (Serbian Cyrillic: Бојан Печар) (22 March 1960 – 13 October 1998) was a Yugoslav and Serbian musician, best known as bass player of the cult Yugoslav rock band Ekatarina Velika.

== Early life ==
He was conceived in a Yugoslav marriage between a Slovenian father and Serbian mother. Although he was known for being naturally musical and recognized as a self-taught and innovative musician, he also had a formal primary musical education for the violin.

== Musical career ==
His first band was a school orchestra called BG 5. The group also featured future Katarina II bandmate Ivan Vdović. After Bojan left the group, he formed the new wave group VIA Talas which featured singer Mira Mijatović as well as Dušan Gerzić and Miško Petrović (both would later collaborate with the group Ekatarina Velika in some capacity). VIA Talas were featured on the Yugoslav new wave compilation album Artistička radna akcija. By the time they recorded their own album Perfektan dan za banana ribe, only Bojan and Mira remained members of the group (renamed to just Talas), but the album featured guest appearances from (among others) Katarina II members Milan Mladenović and Ivan Vdović. The opening track Sama was a big hit and was featured on the soundtrack of the popular movie Šećerna vodica.

Bojan himself had joined Katarina II in late 1982. The group was renamed to Ekatarina Velika in 1984, achieved mainstream success and gained a cult following. Together with Milan Mladenović and Margita Stefanović he formed the core of the band during its most successful and productive period over which they had recorded 5 studio albums. He left the group in 1990 and moved to London. Even though the band was active until Mladenović's death in 1994, many consider Bojan's departure the beginning of the end.

In London, he played for the band Lost Children with Dušan Kojić - Koja.

== Death ==
He died on 13 October 1998 in London, England, officially of a heart attack, and was buried in Progar, outside Belgrade, Serbia.

== Discography ==
with VIA Talas

- Perfektan dan za banana ribe (1983)

with Katarina II / Ekatarina Velika

- Katarina II (1984)
- Ekatarina Velika (1985)
- S' vetrom uz lice (1986)
- Ljubav (1987)
- Samo par godina za nas (1989)

== See also ==
- Yugoslav rock
- Serbian rock
