= Belgrade Youth Center =

Cultural center in Belgrade, Serbia

- Дом омладине Београда
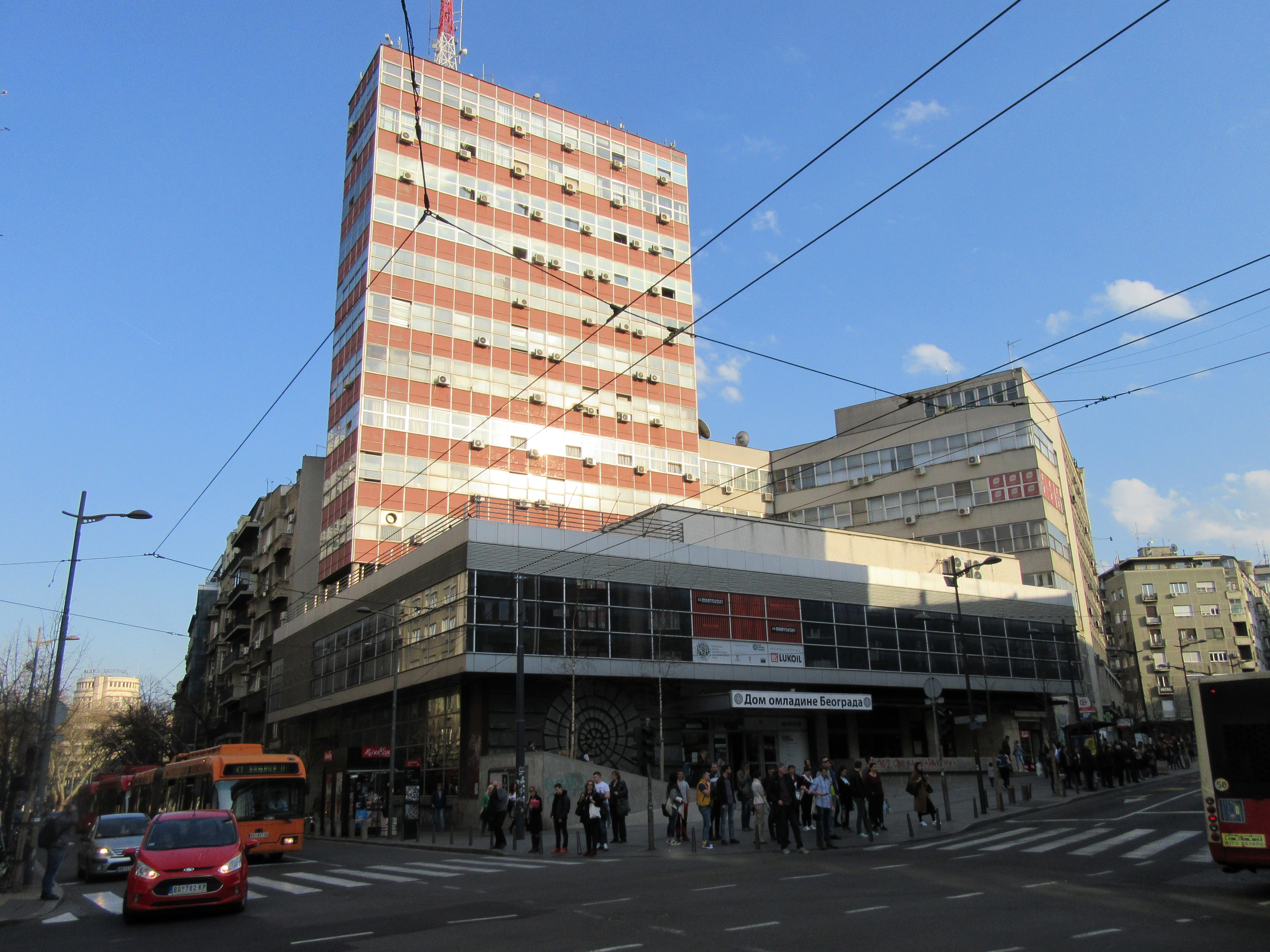
- Belgrade Youth Center in 2019
- Interactive map of Belgrade Youth Center
- Location: Belgrade, Serbia
- Coordinates: 44.8154112°N 20.4628945°E
- Owner: City of Belgrade
- Type: Cultural center

Construction
- Opened: 18 October 1964
- Renovated: 12 March 2011
- Closed: 19 December 2025

Website
- www.domomladine.org

Belgrade Youth Center (Serbian: Dom omladine Beograda; abbr. DOB) is a cultural center in Belgrade, the capital of Serbia, dedicated primarily to youth.

== History ==
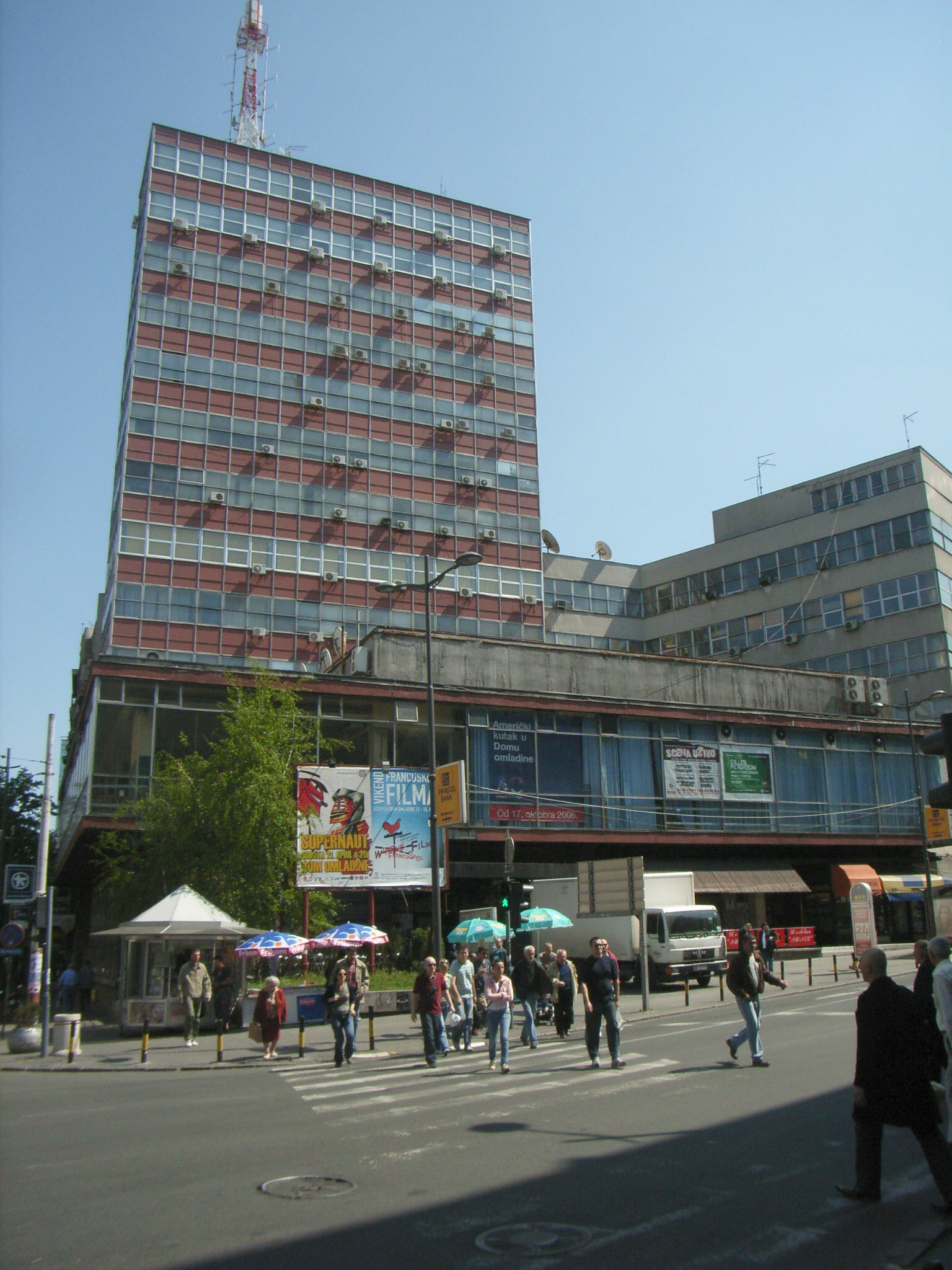
Belgrade Youth Center in 2007 before renovation

At the corner of the Dečanska and Makedonska streets, where the youth center is today, was the location of the kafana "Ginić". One of the most popular kafanas in Belgrade in its heyday, it was a gathering point of the journalists and reporters from the Politika daily, which was located nearby. The satirical magazine Ošišani Jež ("shaved hedgehog") was founded in the venue. Next to "Ginić" was another kafana, "Prozor". The ground floor houses were demolished to make way for the much taller Youth Center building.

From 2006 until 2011, the Belgrade Youth Center building underwent reconstruction.

== Overview ==
The center was founded on 18 October 1964 It is organized as a city owned company, under the auspices of the Secretariate of Culture of the City Assembly of Belgrade, which provides the main funds for the center.

The DOB organizes numerous programs in the area of contemporary art and culture, as well as educational-debate programs. It aims to encompass all art forms: prose, poetry, music, theatre, film, visual arts, new media and others. It functions as a platform for promoting new artists, ideas and initiatives. Additionally, Belgrade Youth Center is a meeting point for domestic and foreign artists. DOB is a member of local, regional and international cultural networks. Some 1,500 programs are organized in the institution per year, with 400,000 visitors annually.

The venue was known for rock performances and a disco cub in the 1960s and the 1970s. The first exhibition of Marina Abramović was held here, so as showings of the erotic movies within the FEST film festival. Belgrade Jazz Festival was founded in the DOB in 1971. Despite this liberalism in venue's operations, Communist President of Yugoslavia, Josip Broz Tito visited the locale. In the 1990sm after the reintroduction of the multi-party political system, many parties held their founding congresses in the Youth Center.

== Organization ==
DOB's activities are organized in five centers:

- Center of Music Development,
- Center of Visual Arts and Multimedia,
- Center of Education and Interactive Communication,
- Center of Publishing, and
- Laboratory of Initiatives – Art & creativity unlimited.

== Venue ==
Dom omladine is located in the center of Belgrade, near the Republic Square. For its programs, it maintains:

- Big hall (520 sitting places or 1200 standing places),
- Americana Hall (300 sitting places or 800 standing places),
- Club (100 sitting places or 300 standing places),
- Art Gallery,
- Debate room (60 sitting places), and
- American Corner.

Separate from this building, the DOB also has the Magacin on Kraljevića Marka Street, a former warehouse near the city center with over 5,000 square meters of available space.

Some 30 metres (98 ft) under the building is the main collecting well for the underground waters in this part of Belgrade. It is operated by the electrical pumps. It was estimated that in the case of power shortage or pumps defect, in less than three hours water would flood the building, up to the third row of seats in the Big Hall.

The building was fully renovated in the early 2010s and re-opened on 12 March 2011. The edifice has several valuable works of arts. They include the monumental façade mosaic by Lazar Vozarević, a 7 by 9 m (23 by 30 ft) painting of Mića Popović and semi-precious brown stones, gift from Africa. On the façade, there is also a sculpture "Sun" by Dušan Džamonja. The elevated section in front of the "Sun" in time began known as the "Zidić" ("Small wall"), where musicians perform outdoors live.

== Plateau of Milan Mladenović ==
In July 2011 the area in front of the DOB was named a Plateau of Milan Mladenović, in honor of the late frontman of EKV who died in 1994 at the age of 36. Since 2013, the short wall in front of the building has been turned into an open stage during summers. A reconstruction of the plateau, which would include granite slabs sidewalks and avenue was announced in August 2017. First phase, which included the paving with the granite slabs and planting an avenue (consisting of birch and liquidambar trees) was finished by November 2017.
