= VIA Talas =

Yugoslavian band

- The original VIA Talas lineup: Dušan Gerzić, Miško Plavi, Mira Mijatović, and Bojan Pečar.

Background information
- Also known as: Talas
- Origin: Belgrade, Serbia, Yugoslavia
- Genres: New wave, pop rock
- Years active: 1981–1983
- Labels: Sarajevo Disk, Jugoton, PGP-RTB, PGP-RTS
- Past members: Bojan Pečar; Dušan Gerzić; Mira Mijatović; Miško Petrović

VIA Talas (Serbian Cyrillic: ВИА Талас; trans. VIE The Wave) was a former Yugoslav new wave band, notable as one of the participants of the Artistička radna akcija project. The band name featured the prefix VIA added to the former Yugoslav 1960s rock bands, which stands for 'vokalno-instrumentalni ansambl' ('vocal-instrumental ensemble').

== History ==
The band was formed in the early 1980s by former BG 5 member Bojan Pečar (vocals, bass, guitar, synthesizer, percussion), Mira Mijatović (the daughter of the Yugoslav politician Cvijetin Mijatović, vocals), Dušan Gerzić "Gera" (saxophone, drums) and Miško Petrović "Plavi" (bass, guitar, backing vocals). The band participated the Artistička radna akcija (Artistic Work Action) various artists compilation, featuring the second generation of Belgrade new wave and punk rock bands, with two songs, "Hawai (najljepši kraj)" ("Hawai (The Most Beautiful Place)") and "Lilihip (My Boy Lollipop)", the later being a cover version of a Millie Small song "My Boy Lollipop". The band also performed as an opening act for Idoli at their first concert.

By the time the band had released their debut album Perfektan dan za banana ribe (A perfect day for bananafish), in 1983, under the name Talas, which got the title by the J. D. Salinger's short-story "A Perfect Day for Bananafish", Pečar and Mijatović were the only band members. The album featured eight songs, and the album's opening track "Sama" ("Alone") became a nationwide hit and appeared on the Svetislav "Bata" Prelić's Šećerna vodica movie soundtrack. The album, recorded at the Belgrade MS studio, was produced by Pečar and Boban Petrović and released through Sarajevo Disk in 3000 copies only. As guests on the album appeared Milan "Mića" Bubalo (drum machine), Ivan Vdović "Vd" (drums), Milan Mladenović (guitar) and Vuk Vujačić (saxophone).

The band's song "Ti" appeared on the Ventilator 202 - Demo top 10 compilation album but, soon after, the band ceased to exist.

== Post-breakup ==
Mira Mijatović died of a drug overdose.

Gerzić worked as a designer and graphic artist and collaborated with Yugoslav new wave bands like Haustor, Električni orgazam, Idoli, D' Boys and Ekatarina Velika. In 1986, he finished the Applied Arts studies in Belgrade and held numerous exhibitions in SFR Yugoslavia and abroad. He worked in Paris, New York City, Toronto, and, in 1997, he returned to Belgrade where he died the following year.

Bojan Pečar joined Katarina II, which, after the release of their self titled album, was renamed to Ekatarina Velika, with whom he released four more studio and one live album. In early 1990 he left the band and moved to London and played in a band called Mission. He also wrote poetry and was a painter. On October 16, 1998, Pečar died of a heart attack in London.

The only surviving member of the band is Petrović. He joined D' Boys as guitarist and bass guitarist, until 1986, when he joined Piloti. In 1990 he joined Ekatarina Velika and released the song "Zvezde" on the compilation S' one strane duge. He also started playing accordion and worked on several movie soundtracks and solo projects, and, in 2003, he formed the Miško Plavi Band with musicians from Serbia, India, United Kingdom and Israel. He also participated in the Kao da je bilo nekad... Posvećeno Milanu Mladenoviću tribute to Milan Mladenović and, with Miško Plavi Band, released two studio albums and a live album. He is the member of the Société des auteurs, compositeurs et éditeurs de musique and Association of Composers of Serbia and the owner of two golden and one platinum record.

In 2005, "Ti" was reissued on a PGP-RTS compilation Specijal 2: Dan zaljubljenih

In October 2020, “Perfektan Dan Za Banana Ribe” was reissued.

== Legacy ==
In 1998, the various artists compilation Ventilator 202 vol. 1, featuring the band's song "Ti", appeared on the 100th place on the 100 greatest Yugoslav popular music albums list, released in the book YU 100: najbolji albumi jugoslovenske rok i pop muzike (YU 100: The Best albums of Yugoslav pop and rock music).

In 2006, the song "Sama" was ranked No. 65 on the B92 Top 100 Domestic Songs list.

== Discography ==
=== Studio albums ===
- Perfektan dan za banana ribe (1983)

=== Other appearances ===
- "Hawai (najljepši kraj)" / "Lilihip (My Boy Lollipop)" (Artistička radna akcija, 1981)
- "Ti" (Ventilator 202 vol. 1, 1983)
- "Ti" (Specijal 2: Dan zaljubljenih, 2005)

== See also ==
- New wave music in Yugoslavia

== Bibliography ==
- EX YU ROCK enciklopedija 1960-2006, Janjatović Petar; ISBN 978-86-905317-1-4
