= Bistriji ili tuplji čovek biva kad... =

Studio album by Šarlo Akrobata
- Released: July 1981
- Recorded: April–May 1981
- Genre: Post-punk; reggae rock; ska punk; art punk; new wave; experimental rock
- Label: Jugoton
- Producer: Akpiđoto (Akrobata; Mile "Pile" Miletić; Đorđe Petrović; Toni Jurij)

Šarlo Akrobata chronology
Paket aranžman (1981)	Bistriji ili tuplji čovek biva kad... (1981)

Bistriji ili tuplji čovek biva kad... (transl. Brighter or Dumber a Man Gets When...) is the only full-length album by the Belgrade band Šarlo Akrobata. Extremely well received by the critics, it has nevertheless failed to achieve much commercial success. In the years since, however, it has reached a cult status, having often been labeled "one of the most important links in the complete oeuvre of ex-Yugo rock", and has influenced many artists in the nineties and beyond, including Rambo Amadeus and Jarboli.

== Album ==
By early 1981 Šarlo Akrobata created enough buzz that PGP RTB came calling with an offer of a full-length album. During April 1981, Šarlo recorded the material that would eventually be named Bistriji ili tuplji čovek biva kad..., which confused PGP's executives so thoroughly that they immediately sold it to Jugoton.

Up to that point Šarlo based their sound around punk and white reggae, whereas on this record they broke new ground even by their own innovative standards.

The creative tasks were divided up according to trio's individual sensibilities. Milan's role was basic melody, Koja did his best to destabilise the sound by mixing Hendrix with punk on his bass, while Vd had the unenviable task of bridging this gap. Even the lyrics bare major differences: Koja's are minimalistic, akin to angry graffiti whereas Milan's are layered and poetic. The approach worked like a charm within the context of the record: by fusing different genres and energies they made something that was inherently their own. Jurij Novoselić, Dejan Kostić and old friend Gagi Mihajlović also took part in the recording sessions.

The album got its name from a text found in Vasa Pelagić's book Narodni učitelj. Excerpts from the same book were used on track "Pazite na decu I", a song seen as significant because it features Milan playing drums, Vd on guitar, Dejan Kostić on bass, Gagi Mihajlović on piano, while Koja played percussion and let out an occasional shriek.

The record came out during the summer of 1981.

== Track listing ==
All music and lyrics written by Šarlo Akrobata.

No.	Title	Length
1.	"Šarlo je nežan" (Charlot Is Gentle)	0:55
2.	"Pazite na decu (I)" (Take Care Of Children (I))	3:34
3.	"Fenomen" (Phenomenon)	1:50
4.	"Sad se jasno vidi" (Now It's Clearly Seen)	1:36
5.	"Rano izjutra" (Early In The Morning)	3:10
6.	"Ljubavna priča" (Love Story)	7:11
7.	"Samo ponekad" (Just Occasionally)	2:19
8.	"Čovek" (Man)	2:43
9.	"Bes" (Rage)	1:20
10.	"O, O, O..."	2:59
11.	"Problem"	4:31
12.	"Ja želim jako" (I Want Strongly)	1:47
13.	"Pazite na decu (II)" (Take Care Of Children (II))	3:53

== Personnel ==
- Milan Mladenović - guitar, vocals
- Dušan Kojić - bass guitar, vocals
- Ivan Vdović - drums, vocals

== Legacy ==
In 1998, the album was polled as the 11th on the list of 100 greatest Yugoslav rock and pop albums in the book YU 100: najbolji albumi jugoslovenske rok i pop muzike (YU 100: The Best albums of Yugoslav pop and rock music).

In 2015, the album was pronounced the second on the list of 100 greatest Yugoslav album, published by Croatian edition of Rolling Stone.

== Charts ==
Chart performance for Bistriji ili tuplji čovek biva kad...
Chart (2021)	Peak position
Croatian Domestic Albums (HDU)	1
