= Ivan Vdović =

Ivan Vdović Иван Вдовић
- Ivica Vdović

Background information
- Also known as: Vd
- Born: 14 March 1961; Belgrade, PR Serbia, FPR Yugoslavia
- Died: 25 September 1992 (aged 31) Belgrade, Serbia, FR Yugoslavia
- Genres: New wave; punk rock; jazz
- Instrument: Drums
- Years active: 1979–1992
- Formerly of: Limunovo drvo; Suncokret; Katarina II; Šarlo Akrobata; Annoda Rouge; DDT

Ivan "Ivica" Vdović (Serbian Cyrillic: Иван "Ивица" Вдовић; 14 March 1961 – 25 September 1992), also known as Vd (Serbian Cyrillic: Вд), was a Serbian musician, drummer of Yugoslav rock bands such as Suncokret, Šarlo Akrobata and Katarina II.

In his junior year of high school, Vdović became a member of the band Limunovo drvo led by Milan Mladenović. He later played drums in Bora Đorđević's band Suncokret which had two famous members Bilja Krstić and Gorica Popović. In the early 1980s he briefly played in Annoda Rouge band/project with Goran Vejvoda and his then-girlfriend Bebi Dol on vocals, and Slobodan Trbojevic on bass. The band never released any official material for commercial exploitation. Vdović became famous as the drummer of Šarlo Akrobata whose other two members were Mladenović and Dušan Kojić. He stayed with Šarlo Akrobata from April 1980 to October 1981, and then joined Mladenović to form Katarina II together with Bojan Pečar, Gagi Mihajlović and Margita Stefanović. After Mihajlović left the band, the name was changed to Ekatarina Velika but Vdović soon left the band in 1985.

The same year, Vdović was diagnosed to be HIV-positive. He was the first person in Yugoslavia to be officially registered as HIV-positive. He died of AIDS on 25 September 1992 and is buried in Belgrade.

He is considered as one of the most important cultural reformers of music in former Yugoslavia, and one of the starters of the new wave.
