= Margita Stefanović =

Serbian musician

Margita Stefanović Маргита Стефановић
- Margita Stefanović on the cover of EKV's Ljubav album

Background information
- Born: 1 April 1959; Belgrade, PR Serbia, FPR Yugoslavia
- Died: 18 September 2002 (aged 43) Belgrade, Serbia, FR Yugoslavia
- Genres: Rock; post-punk; new wave; classical; techno
- Instrument: Keyboards
- Years active: 1982–2002
- Formerly of: Ekatarina Velika; Karlowy Vary; EQV; The Glissers

Margita "Magi" Stefanović (Serbian Cyrillic: Маргита "Маги" Стефановић; 1 April 1959 – 18 September 2002) was a Serbian musician best known as the keyboardist of the Yugoslav rock band Ekatarina Velika (EKV).

== Biography ==
Born in Belgrade and of Kosovo Serb and Montenegrin descent, she was the only child of well-known Čačak-born theatre and television director Slavoljub Stefanović-Ravasi and Kačikol-born teacher Desanka Nikolić. After finishing elementary school, Margita enrolled in the Josip Slavenski Music High School from which she graduated as the most talented pianist (also being blessed with perfect pitch) in her class alongside Ivo Pogorelić. Her impressive school performance led to an offer of further studies at the famed Moscow Conservatory, which she ended up turning down due to family reasons—her mother very much disliked the idea of letting her go to Moscow by herself at such a young age. Instead, Margita enrolled at the University of Belgrade's Faculty of Architecture where she was no less successful. Throughout her architecture studies she still continued practicing the piano as well as playing and occasionally touring with various small orchestras.

After graduating university in 1982, along with her then-boyfriend Srđan Vejvoda, the older brother of Goran Vejvoda, she began to take an interest in Belgrade's underground music scene, which introduced her to a completely different lifestyle from the one she was used to. During the spring of 1982, she was briefly introduced to Milan Mladenović by her cousin Gagi Mihajlović, both were members of the band Katarina II at the time. She also became friends with Ljubomir Đukić of the group Električni Orgazam. One night in the basement of Belgrade's SKC (a popular concert venue and gathering spot for young musicians), she sat very close to Đukić and started playing his keyboard. A few moments later, Milan Mladenović entered the room, liked the music and joined in on bass guitar, but at first thought that both of them were playing the keyboard together. When he noticed that, in fact, only she was playing and Đukić's hands were not moving, he was even more impressed by her skill. Even though Katarina II did not feature keyboards at the time, she received an offer to rehearse with the band and soon also an offer to join as a full member. After returning from a three-month trip to South America, she decided to take the still-standing offer, joining Katarina II in late 1982. A few weeks after her, bassist Bojan Pečar joined the band. Along with him and Mladenović, Margita represented the long-standing core of the band (renamed to Ekatarina Velika (EKV) in 1984 while Mihajlović was being let go) and she stayed a member of EKV until its very end in late 1994.

During her time with the band, she also collaborated on the albums of many other Yugoslav bands such as Parni Valjak, Karlowy Vary produced by Tomo in der Mühlen, Elvis J. Kurtović & His Meteors, Van Gogh, Babe etc.

Portrait by Stanislav Sharp

She composed the score for several TV films (Prvi put s ocem na jutrenje, Vera Hofmanova, Povratak Vuka Alimpića, Plavi plavi) and theatre productions (Klasni neprijatelj, Tri sestre). In 1985, she was introduced as an actress (the role of Dragana) in the movie Taiwan Canasta directed by Goran Marković. Being one of few female rock instrumentalists in Yugoslavia, combined with her good looks, musical talent, high intelligence and charismatic stage presence made her into an intriguing star and sex symbol.

After Milan's death and Ekatarina Velika's end, Magi continued her work as a musician. During 1994–95 she played in a band called Kurajberi, which gathered several Belgrade musicians and was focused mainly on performing covers at club gigs and jam sessions. In 1995, with a group of young Belgrade musicians involved in a techno movement, she formed a band called EQV and released an album Ti si sav moj bol named after the famous Ekatarina Velika song off S' vetrom uz lice, the album itself containing a techno version of the same song. The album was published by the Austrian label Coop Arts & Crafts Unlimited. In October of the same year, EQV participated in Tactic Festival in Vienna. She further continued contributing as a guest star on albums and concerts of many Serbian bands and occasionally played with bands the Glissers, Zion Banda and Direktori. Magi played keyboards in Belgrade's band the Glissers in 1995 and 1996. They performed on a weekly basis and released a CD The Glissers Vol. 1 for IMAGO Records. She also designed the cover for it. In 2019, it was re-released by Yugovinyl and BIVECO as an album in vinyl form under the title The Glissers. In 1996, she played several unplugged concerts with Električni Orgazam, one of which was recorded and released the same year by B92 as Živo i akustično. During that time, she was also involved in several significant music projects (S one strane duge, Pesme iznad Istoka i Zapada). In December 1998, she became the first rock artist from Serbia to perform in Croatia following the Yugoslav Wars.

Sometime in 1996, Stefanović became a member of Ars Antibari writers society from Bar, which published several of her stories in two books (Izgleda da će jugo, Bar, 1996; and Da li da ti kažem ko te je ubio, Gea?, Belgrade, 1999). In 2002, she composed the music for the theatre play Kaput mrtvog čoveka directed by Hajdana Baletić, which turned out to be Stefanović's last music-related work.

However, from 1996 onwards her life was mostly spent struggling with heroin addiction and the physical effects of long-term drug use. Following the death of her father in February 1996, Stefanović's drug problems intensified. In order to support her addiction, she sold pretty much all of her possessions including an apartment in Vračar. She used part of the money for a trip to India, and also to buy two smaller apartments in Zvezdara and Čubura. Not long thereafter she sold those as well and eventually ended up living in a ramshackle modified garage in the suburb of Borča. By this time she was basically penniless, depending on charity and handouts for even the basics such as food.

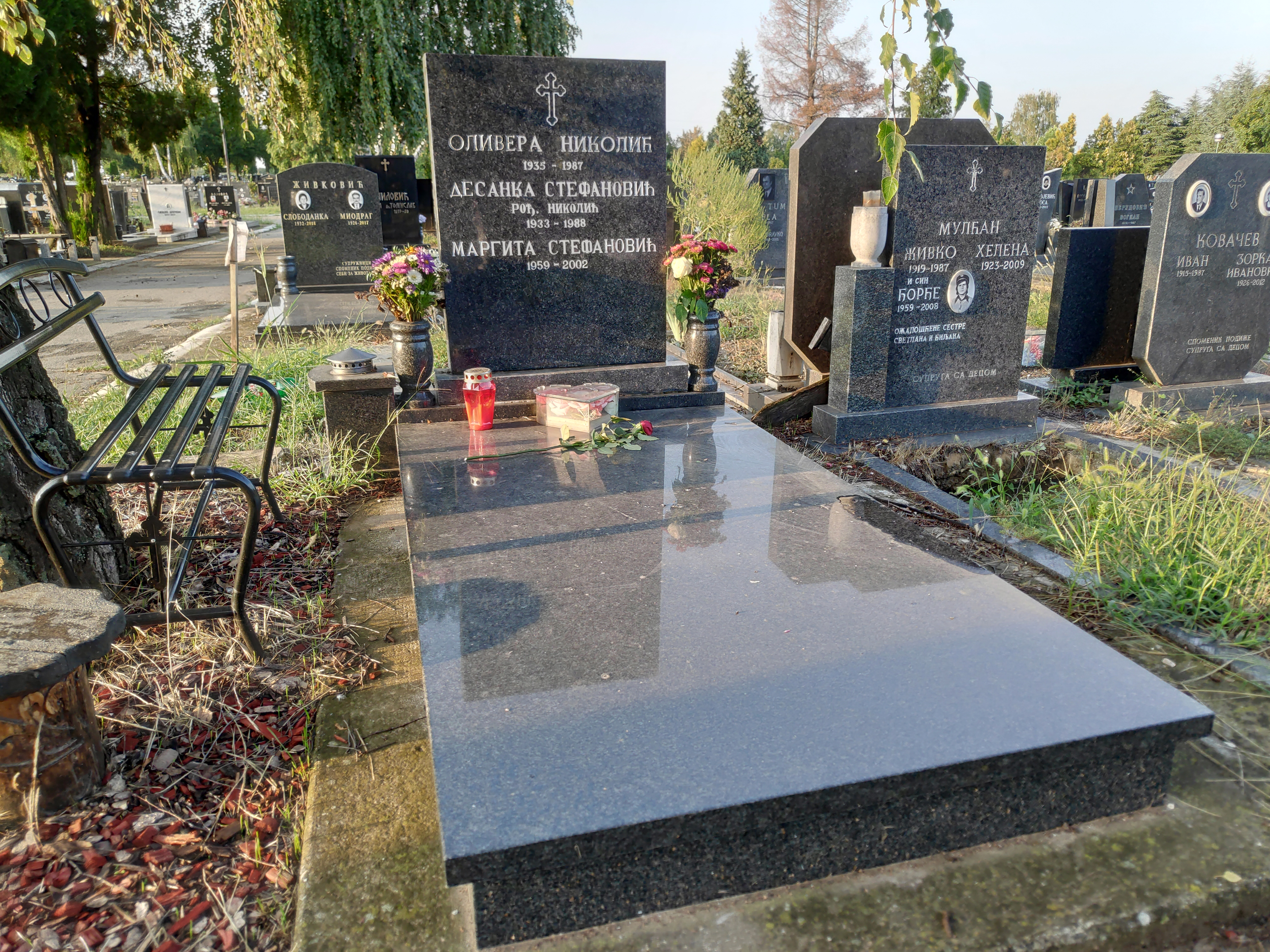
Grave

Margita Stefanović spent the last months of her life living in a homeless shelter in Voždovac. She was diagnosed to be HIV-positive, which she contracted through intravenous drug use. She died of toxoplasmosis on 18 September 2002 at the Belgrade Hospital for Infective Diseases, where she had been sequestered since August of the same year.

== Other ==
Magi played keyboards in Belgrade's band "The Glissers" 1995. and 1996. They performed on a weekly basis and released a CD "The Glissers Vol. 1" She also designed the cover for it. In 2019. it came out in vinyl form as an Album The Glissers.

- There is an urban legend about Margita being the subject of the first-ever graffiti that appeared in Belgrade. The graffiti was written on the wall of her apartment building, and it said "Margita je dečak" ("Margita is a boy"), implying that she was an atypical girl of the era. The graffiti was sprayed by Nebojša Krstić, at the time a member of the Serbian new wave band VIS Idoli.
- In July 2008, a book Vrati unatrag by Aleksandar Ilić, featuring conversations with Magi was released.
- In October 2011, a voluminous, richly illustrated intimate memoir titled "Osećanja. O. Sećanja" written by Magi's close lifelong friend Lidija Nikolić was released by the small publishing house "Cekic" in Belgrade. The book has already been reprinted once.
- Slovenian singer-songwriter and former acquaintance Zoran Predin dedicated a song to her in 2012. The inspiration was his actual dream in which they met again, but she (while being eternally young in his memory) didn't recognize him due to him aging and having grey hair. The song's title Kosa boje srebra is an allusion to the EKV song Oči boje meda.

== Sources ==
- Magi, zvezda koja večno traje (Belgrade, 2002)
- Petar Janjatović: Ilustrovana Yu-Rock enciklopedija (Belgrade, 1998)
- Aleksandar Žikić: Mesto u mećavi (Belgrade, 1997)
- Dušan Vesić: Magi: Kao da je bila nekad (Zagreb, 2023)
