= Milan Mladenović =

Yugoslav musician (1958–1994)

Milan Mladenović Милан Младеновић
- Mladenović in 1992

Background information
- Born: 21 September 1958; Zagreb, PR Croatia, FPR Yugoslavia
- Died: 5 November 1994 (aged 36) Belgrade, Serbia, FR Yugoslavia
- Genres: Art rock; post-punk; new wave
- Instruments: Vocals; guitar
- Years active: 1977–1994
- Formerly of: Limunovo Drvo; Šarlo Akrobata; Ekatarina Velika; Rimtutituki; Angel's Breath

Milan Mladenović (Serbian Cyrillic: Милан Младеновић; 21 September 1958 – 5 November 1994) was a Yugoslav and Serbian musician best known as the frontman and guitarist of the Yugoslav art rock band Ekatarina Velika.

== Early life ==
Born to Serb father Spasa from Kruševac and Croat mother Danica from Podgora, Milan's first years were spent in Zagreb, PR Croatia, where his father, an officer in the Yugoslav People's Army, was stationed at the time. Consequently, Milan grew up wherever it was that his dad's job took the family. In total, it ended up being three cities.

When he was six, Milan's family moved to Sarajevo where he spent a notable part of his childhood in the Grbavica neighbourhood.

Eventually in 1970, they moved to Belgrade just short of his 12th birthday. Once in Belgrade, Milan attended the Eleventh Belgrade Gymnasium in the Lekino Brdo neighbourhood while simultaneously entering the circle of young people involved with music and arts.

He received his first acoustic guitar in 1968 or 1969 from his father. In 1979, his father also bought him his iconic Gibson RD Artist guitar.

According to fellow longtime band member Margita Stefanović, Mladenović was bisexual.

== Musical career ==
=== Limunovo Drvo and Šarlo Akrobata ===
With schoolmate Gagi Mihajlović, Mladenović formed a band called Limunovo Drvo (Lemon Tree) that dabbled in melodic hard rock. The group changed lineups frequently, displaying a limited creative potential until the arrival of bassist Dušan "Koja" Kojić and drummer Ivan "Vd" Vdović. Soon afterwards, they adopted a new musical direction (new wave) and changed the name to Šarlo Akrobata. During this time Milan was musically fond of and inspired by Elvis Costello, Paul Weller, and Andy Partridge of XTC.

Šarlo Akrobata released only one album, Bistriji ili tuplji čovek biva kad... in July 1981 and broke up soon afterward due to creative differences between Milan and Koja. The record is considered to be one of the best and most important albums of the Yugoslav new wave music scene.

=== Katarina II and Ekatarina Velika ===
In late 1981, Milan and his former bandmate from Limunovo drvo, Gagi Mihajlović (guitar), formed Katarina II. In 1982 Margita Stefanović (keyboards), Bojan Pečar (bass) and Ivan Vdović Vd joined the band. After the self-titled, new wave coloured debut album, Vd and Gagi left the band. Since Gagi claimed ownership of the "Katarina II" name, the band was forced to take another one. They eventually settled on Ekatarina Velika and released a self-titled album in 1985. The album was widely critically acclaimed and brought them wider attention. Their next album S' vetrom uz lice launched them to the very top of the Yugoslav music scene, where they stayed for a long time, releasing a series of successful records. The concerts were jam packed and finally their music even made it on the state radio.

=== Final works ===
In 1992, Mladenović joined other Serbian musicians to form Rimtutituki project dedicated to the anti-war campaign. They released one single titled "Slušaj 'vamo". In the spring of 1994, Mladenović recorded and released an album called Angel's Breath in Brazil together with his old friend Suba (Mitar Subotić).

== Death ==
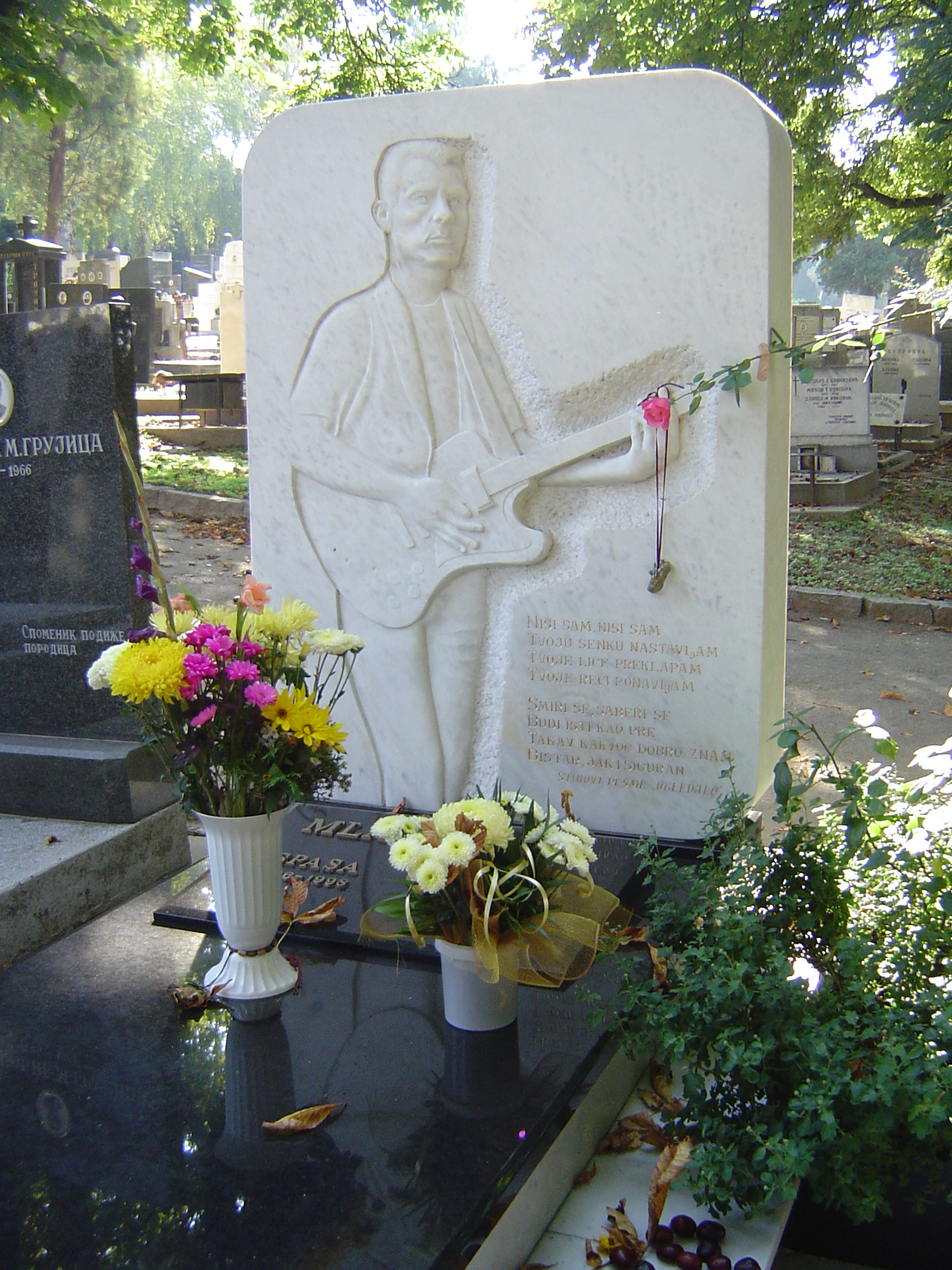
Grave

In October of 1994, Mladenović discovered that he had pancreatic cancer. He died on November 5 in Belgrade, aged 36. He was buried at the Belgrade New Cemetery (lot No. 114).

== Legacy ==
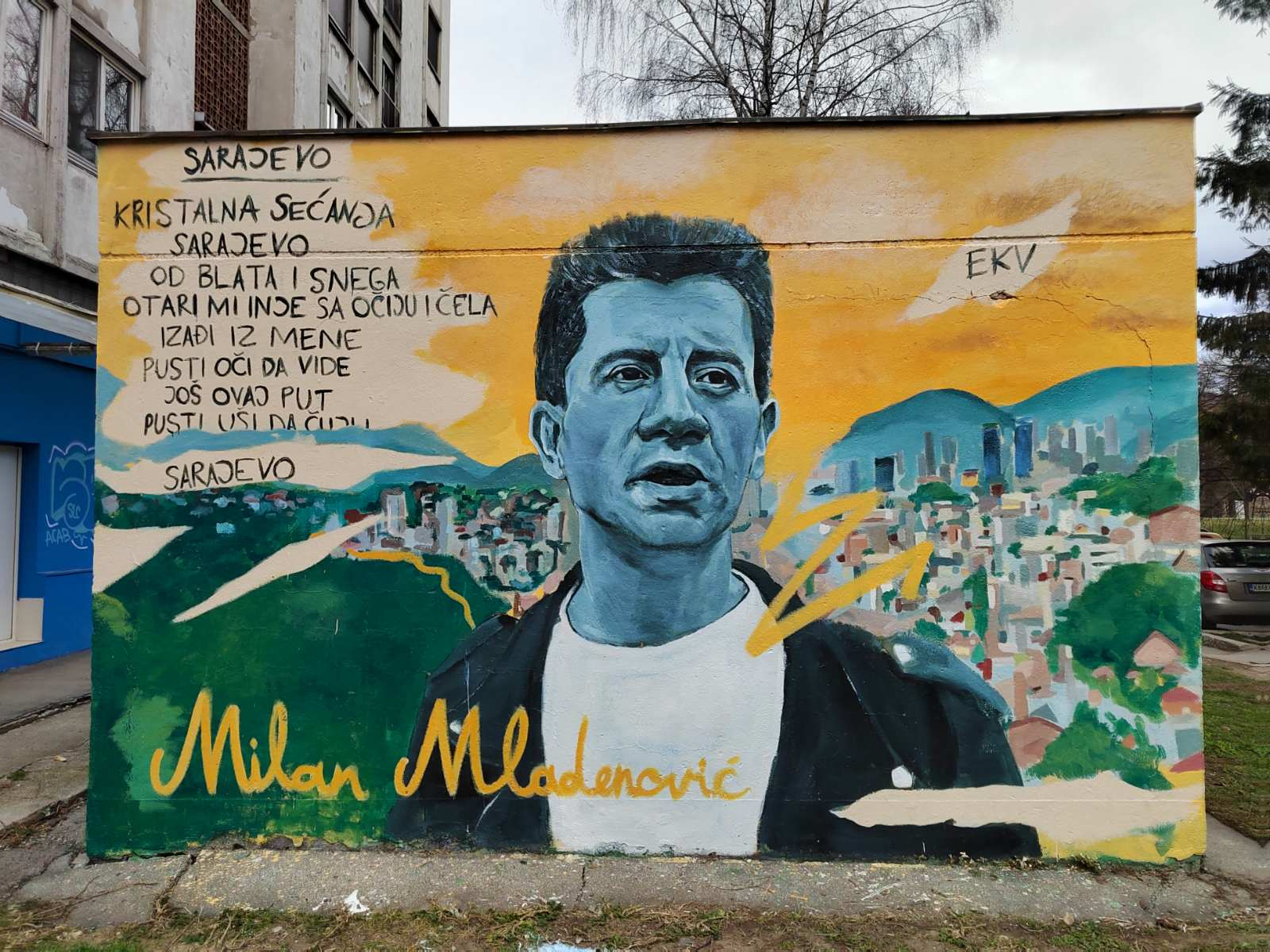
Mural of Mladenović in Sarajevo's Grbavica neighborhood

Three streets in the capital cities of former Yugoslav republics bear Mladenović's name. A street in the Belgrade neighborhood Zemun Polje was named after him in 2004, a street in the Podgorica neighborhood Zabjelo in 2007, and a street in Zagreb (Croatia) in 2012.

Since 14 July 2011 the forecourt of the Belgrade Youth Center bears the name "Milan Mladenović Place".

In 2025, the town of Makarska (Croatia) dedicated a memorial to him. It is in the form of a circular bench with engraved lyrics from the EKV song Krug (The Circle). His mother hailed from the area and he also spent some summers there.

== Studio discography ==
=== with Šarlo Akrobata ===
- Paket aranžman (with Električni orgazam and Idoli; 1980)
- Bistriji ili tuplji čovek biva kad... (1981)

=== with Ekatarina Velika ===
- Katarina II (1984)
- Ekatarina Velika (1985)
- S' vetrom uz lice (1986)
- Ljubav (1987)
- Samo par godina za nas (1989)
- Dum Dum (1991)
- Neko nas posmatra (1993)

=== with Angel's Breath ===
- Angel's Breath (1994)
