= Rock music in Serbia =

Serbian rock is the rock music scene of Serbia. During the 1960s, 1970s and the 1980s, while Serbia was a constituent republic of Socialist Federal Republic of Yugoslavia, Serbian rock scene was a part of the SFR Yugoslav rock scene.

The Socialist Federal Republic of Yugoslavia was not an Eastern Bloc country, but a member of the Non-Aligned Movement and as such, it was far more open to the Western culture comparing to the other socialist countries. Rock and roll reached Yugoslavia via foreign radio stations, most notably Radio Luxemburg, and rock and roll records, brought in from the West. Rock and roll influences reached schlager singers, most notably Đorđe Marjanović, who released the first popular music solo album in Serbia, in 1959. The end of the 1950s featured the appearances of first rock and roll acts, and the 1960s featured many beat bands, such as Siluete and Elipse, which became enormously popular with the younger generations. Rock bands drew the public's attention to themselves, which was followed with the appearance of first rock music magazines, radio and TV shows.

Until the beginning of the 1970s, Serbian rock bands released only 7-inch singles and extended plays. Korni Grupa was the first Serbian rock act to release a full-length album, in 1972, and one of the first bands to move towards progressive rock. Progressive rock dominated the Serbian rock scene during the 1970s, with a part of bands incorporating elements of traditional music into their sound. At this period, bands like YU Grupa, Pop Mašina and Smak achieved large mainstream popularity and massive album sales. The end of the 1970s featured the appearance of the prominent hard rock band Riblja Čorba, and the emergence of the closely associated punk rock and new wave scenes. Pekinška Patka was the first Serbian punk rock band to release an album, in 1980. The new wave bands Šarlo Akrobata, Električni Orgazam and Idoli, which appeared on the influential compilation album Paket aranžman in 1980, were followed by many new wave acts. Around 1982, new wave scene declined and many acts moved towards more commercial sound. During the 1980s, pop rock acts, such as Đorđe Balašević and Bajaga i Instruktori, dominated the mainstream scene, but various other rock genres also emerged, and the alternative rock scene, with the acts such as Ekatarina Velika, Disciplina Kičme, and Rambo Amadeus, started to develop and gain mainstream popularity.

With the outbreak of the Yugoslav wars at the beginning of the 1990s, the former Yugoslav rock scene ceased to exist. During the 1990s, most of, both mainstream and underground, rock acts expressed their opposition towards the government of Slobodan Milošević, which caused their absence from most of the government-controlled media. Although several major mainstream acts managed to sustain their popularity (some of them, like Partibrejkers and Van Gogh, even increasing it), and a large underground and independent music scene developed. After the 1999 NATO bombing of FR Yugoslavia and the arrival of the political changes during the 2000s, a new independent scene started to develop. The 2000s also featured the establishing of new connections between the former Yugoslav republics' scenes.

== History ==
=== Rock pioneers (late 1950s – late 1960s) ===
The first rock acts emerged in the late 1950s. Influenced by the rock and roll and rockabilly acts, many young people started performing the so-called "električna muzika" ("electric music"), naming themselves "električari" ("electricians"). One of the first Serbian rock and roll musicians who rose to fame was guitarist Mile Lojpur from Belgrade, often considered the first Serbian or even Yugoslav rock and roll musician. He rose to fame at the dances he and his band Septet M organized at Red Star basketball courts at Kalemegdan. Although Lojpur did not make any recordings, he had a great influence on subsequent development of the scene. Another notable rock and roll artist was Perica Stojančić from Niš, whose debut single was released in 1961.

The singer Đorđe Marjanović became the first Yugoslav superstar. Despite essentially being a schlager singer, Marjanović also performed rock and roll songs. He is also notable as the first Yugoslav popular music singer who had an energetic on-scene appearance. He was the first pop singer to walk off the stage into the audience and perform songs in theatrical manner. His popularity led to the release of his album Muzika za igru in 1959, the first popular music solo album released by PGP-RTB, the biggest Serbian record label. In 1963, Marjanović went on his first Soviet Union tour, where he soon became very popular, and had gone on more than thirty Soviet Union tours since. He continued to perform until 1990, when, on concert in Melbourne, he had a stroke, after which he decided to retire.

The beginning of the 1960s saw the emergence of numerous beat and rhythm and blues bands, the majority of which being initially inspired by the then-popular Cliff Richard and The Shadows: Iskre and Siluete, both formed in 1961; Zlatni Dečaci and Bele Višnje, both formed in 1962; Crni Biseri, Daltoni, Elipse, and Samonikli, all formed in 1963; Tomi Sovilj i Njegove Siluete and Sanjalice, both formed in 1964; Plamenih 5, formed in 1965, Džentlmeni, formed in 1966. Siluete were well known for their shocking appearance and performance, and the band's frontman Zoran Miščević became one of the first Yugoslav rock stars and a sex symbol. The media often promoted rivalry between Siluete and Elipse. Initially formed as a beat band, Elipse moved to soul music and added a brass section when they were joined by vocalist Edi Dekeng, an African student from Congo, in 1967. Crni Biseri featured the prominent musician Vlada Janković "Džet", who later formed the band Tunel and became a well-known Radio Belgrade host. Sanjalice were one of the first former Yugoslav all-female rock bands. The members of Džemtlmeni, brothers Žika and Dragi Jelić, later formed the highly successful progressive/hard rock band YU Grupa. Although all of these bands released only 7-inch singles and extended plays – with the exception of Crni Biseri, which recorded their only studio album Motorok in 1976, and Bele Višnje, which recorded their old songs and released them on the album Pesme naše mladosti in 1994 – they had major influence on the subsequent development of the scene.

=== Mainstream and pop rock (late 1960s – present) ===
Korni Grupa was one of the first Serbian rock bands to achieve major mainstream popularity. Formed in 1968 by former Indexi keyboardist Kornelije Kovač, the band recorded many commercial pop songs released on 7-inch singles, with which they achieved huge popularity and appeared on pop music festivals throughout Yugoslavia. Already influenced by progressive rock, the band moved towards progressive sound with the arrival of vocalist Dado Topić, continuing, however, to release commercial singles. Korni Grupa's 1971 debut album Korni Grupa was the first long play album by a rock act coming from Serbia, and the fourth long play album by a Yugoslav rock act. The band's second, symphonic rock-oriented album, Not an Ordinary Life, released under the name Kornelyans in 1974, was one of the first Yugoslav albums released through a foreign record label. Despite the success with the singles they released in Yugoslavia, the band disbanded due to the little success of Not an Ordinary Life and the song "Moja generacija", with which the band represented Yugoslavia at the 1974 Eurovision Song Contest.

By the time Korni Grupa disbanded, other Serbian progressive rock bands, like YU Grupa and Smak, had already achieved huge mainstream popularity. YU Grupa, formed in 1970 by former Džentlmeni members, brothers Dragi and Žika Jelić, is often considered the longest-lasting Serbian rock band. Having released several successful singles which featured a fusion of progressive/hard rock and Balkan traditional music, YU Grupa released their first album, YU Grupa (1973), which became one of the best selling Yugoslav rock albums of the 1970s. The band continued to release successful albums, but with the popularity of new wave, the band disbanded in 1981. However, the band reunited in 1987 and has released a number of well-accepted hard rock-oriented albums since. The band Smak from Kragujevac, formed by guitar virtuoso Radomir Mihailović "Točak" in 1971, was, during the second half of the 1970s, competitive with the band Bijelo Dugme from Sarajevo. Smak released several hit singles before releasing their self-titled debut in 1975, considered to be one of the most successful debut albums in former Yugoslavia. The band's later releases, Satelit (1976), Crna dama (1977) and Stranice našeg vremena (1978), saw similar success, but the band disbanded in 1981 for the similar reasons like YU Grupa. The band reunited and disbanded several more times during the 1980s and 1990s, releasing albums that saw little commercial success, although the 2012 reunion of the band's default lineup saw large interest by the audience and covering in the media.

The end of the 1970s featured the appearance of the pop rock band Rani Mraz. Rani Mraz was formed in 1978 by a former Žetva member Đorđe Balašević, and during the initial period went through several lineup changes. The most famous lineup featured Balašević, Verica Todorović, Bora Đorđević and Biljana Krstić, the latter two joining Rani Mraz after leaving the acoustic rock band Suncokret. This lineup of the band released the highly popular single "Računajte na nas", a song which praised the legacy of the Yugoslav Partisans from a slightly different perspective than habitual socialist realism, and soon became an anthem of Yugoslav youth. Đorđević, however, soon left the band to form Riblja Čorba. Rani Mraz released two well-received albums, Mojoj mami umesto maturske slike u izlogu (1979) and Odlazi cirkus (1980), before disbanding in 1981. With the release of the album Pub (1982), Balašević started a very successful solo career, spanning up to the present, establishing himself as the most popular Serbian singer-songwriter.

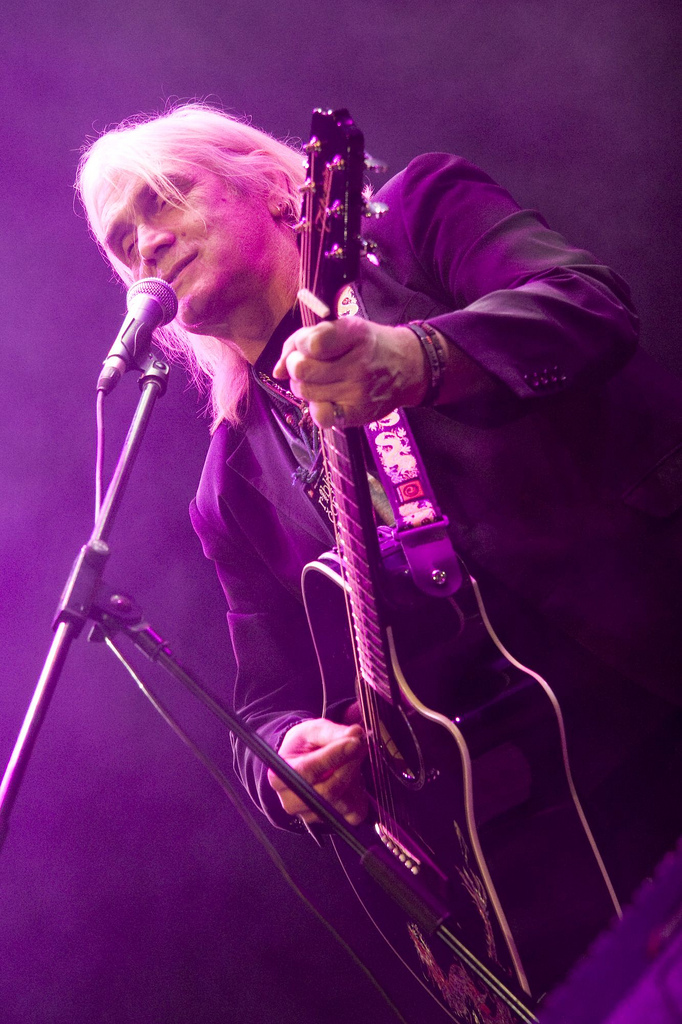
Riblja Čorba frontman Bora Đorđević performing in 2009

The hard rock band Riblja Čorba, formed in 1978, achieved huge success with their debut single "Lutka sa naslovne strane" (1978) and their debut album Kost u grlu (1979). Their following albums, Pokvarena mašta i prljave strasti and Mrtva priroda, both released in 1981, launched them to the top of the Serbian and former Yugoslav rock scene despite their hard rock sound with blues and heavy metal elements, and thanks to their provocative social- and, since the release of Mrtva priroda, political-related lyrics written by the band leader Bora Đorđević. After the album Istina (1985) the band, although still generally fitting into hard rock, started gradually turning towards softer sound, managing to sustain their popularity throughout the decade. However, in the 1990s, Riblja Čorba's popularity heavily declined in Croatia and Bosnia and Herzegovina during the Yugoslav wars, when Ðorđević became an active supporter of the Serbian troops in Republika Srpska and Republika Srpska Krajina, which he demonstrated by recording controversial songs "E moj druže zagrebački" (which was recorded as a response to Jura Stublić's song "E moj druže beogradski") and "Ljetovanje" with the band Mindušari from Knin. However, Ðorđević was also strongly opposed to president Slobodan Milošević and he demonstrated his attitude by writing a number of anti-government songs released on Riblja Čorba albums Zbogom, Srbijo (1993), Ostalo je ćutanje (1996) and Nojeva barka (1999), and on his solo album Njihovi dani (1996).

The end of the 1970s and the beginning of the 1980s featured the appearance of three popular solo singers: Slađana Milošević, Bebi Dol and Oliver Mandić. Aleksandra "Slađana" Milošević released her debut single "Au, au" in 1977. The single saw huge success and was followed by a successful album Gorim od želje da ubijem noć (1979). In 1984, she recorded a highly popular ballad "Princeza" with Dado Topić. During the 1990s and 2000s, she experimented with various musical genres and her popularity heavily declined. Bebi Dol and Oliver Mandić both used simple pop rock forms combined with jazz, synthpop and folk music. Bebi Dol, born Dragana Šarić, with her debut single "Mustafa" (1981) quickly gained the public's attention. Her debut album Ruže i krv (1983) gained positive reviews and good commercial reception. Having high ranks at the MESAM and Jugovizija festivals, she was, with the song "Brazil", the last representative of the Socialist Federative Republic of Yugoslavia at the Eurovision Song Contest. Having released her second album Ritam srca (1995), her popularity declined and she withdrew from performing in the late 1990s, returning in the early 2000s. Oliver Mandić, though active in the 1970s as a member of various progressive rock bands, it was his debut album Probaj me (1980) that brought him the nationwide popularity. With hits appearing on his albums Zbog tebe bih tucao kamen (1982) and Dođe mi da vrisnem tvoje ime (1985), controversial stage performance and clothing style, Mandić achieved large attention and high record sales. In the early 1990s he semi-retired, appearing occasionally only until today.

After the decline of the new wave scene in Serbia, part of the bands moved towards more commercial rock and pop rock sound. Električni Orgazam, after releasing Kako bubanj kaže in 1984, released their commercially most successful albums, Distorzija (1986) and Letim, sanjam, dišem (1988), the latter featuring the anthem hit-song "Igra rock 'n' roll cela Jugoslavija". Električni Orgazam continued with the same musical directions in the 1990s with Zašto da ne! (1994) and A um bum (1999). In 2007, Električni Orgazam performed as an opening act for The Rolling Stones, on the concert held at the Belgrade Ušće park. Idoli, after releasing their debut Odbrana i poslednji dani (1982), recorded their second studio album, Čokolada (1983), which featured a combination of pop rock, funk and electronic music. The album turned out to be the greatest commercial success by the band. Having recorded the Šest dana juna soundtrack (1985) in the 1960s pop rock manner, the band split up and Vlada Divljan released his debut album Tajni život A. P. Šandorova (1988), stylistically similar to the previous Idoli releases. The band Zana, fronted by vocalist Zana Nimani, after their early new wave works moved towards synthpop and pop rock, releasing successful albums Dodirni mi kolena (1982) and Natrag na voz (1983). After the departure of frontress Zana Nimani in 1984, the band changed several vocalists, gradually moving away from the rock scene towards pop music. The reformed Piloti released the highly successful album Kao ptica na mom dlanu in 1987. With the following albums, Osmeh letnje noći (1988) and Neka te bog čuva za mene (1990), the band maintained their popularity, which even increased in the 1990s with the Zaboravljeni soundtrack album (1993). However, the band disbanded in 1997 and, in the meantime, Piloti frontman Zoran "Kiki" Lesendrić released the album Nedelja na Duhove (1995) with former Idoli members Srđan Šaper and Nebojša Krstić under the name Dobrovoljno Pevačko Društvo. During the late 1990s and 2000s Lesendrić worked as a songwriter before releasing his first, very successful solo album Mesec na vratima in 2008, after which he reformed Piloti. Other new wave acts that made a shift towards more commercial sound after the decline of the scene include Bezobrazno Zeleno (which moved towards pop rock), U Škripcu (which moved towards synthpop and pop rock) and Laki Pingvini (which moved towards synthpop and New Romantic).

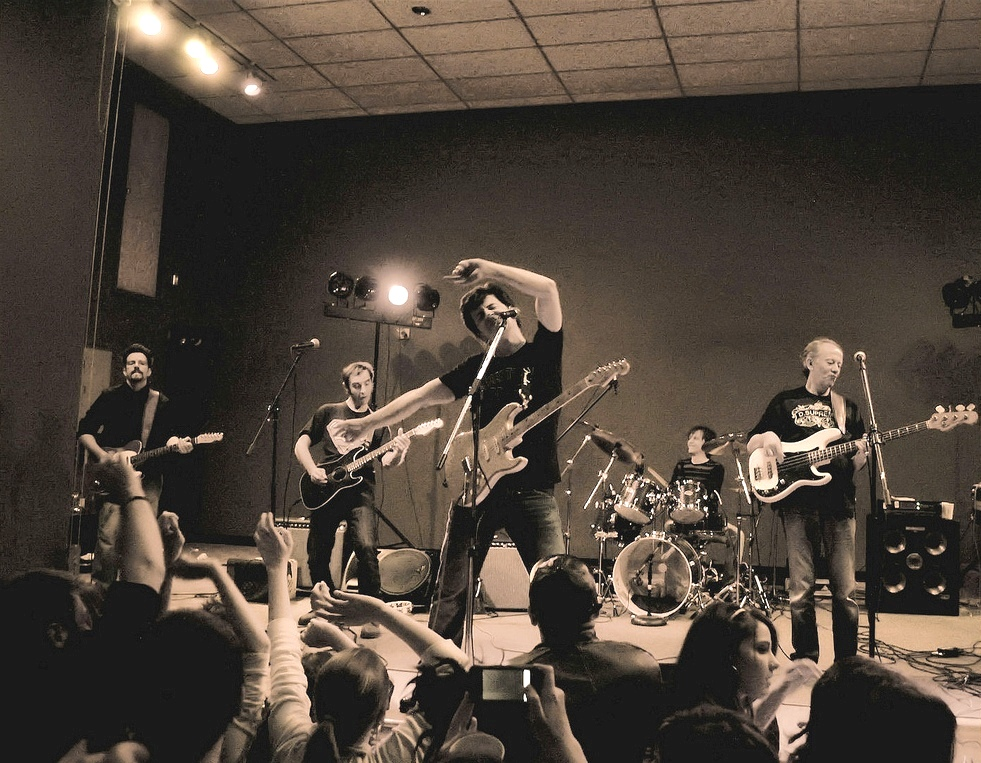
Bajaga i Instruktori performing in 2009

The pop rock band Bajaga i Instruktori, formed in 1984 by former Riblja Čorba member Momčilo Bajagić "Bajaga", after releasing their debut, highly successful solo album Pozitivna geografija in 1983 (originally released as Bajagić's solo album, but, as it featured musicians which would later become members of Bajaga i Instruktori, included in the band's official discography), started releasing successful albums Sa druge strane jastuka (1985) Jahači magle (1986), and Prodavnica tajni (1988), all becoming mega-hits. Bajaga i Instruktori entered the 1990s as one of the most popular Serbian rock acts, managing to maintain the gained popularity through the 1990s.

The mid-1980s pop rock bands Amajlija, Poslednja Igra Leptira, Divlji Anđeli, Slomljena Stakla, Ruž, Alisa, Banana, Jugosloveni, Bel Tempo and Vampiri had a vast number of album sales, however, the majority of them disbanded before reaching the 1990s, or at the very beginning of the decade. Poslednja Igra Leptira, formed in 1980 and led by charismatic frontman Nenad Radulović, also known as Neša Leptir, achieved success with their pop rock songs with humorous lyrics, but disbanded in 1989. Radulović released his solo album Niko nema što piton imade, which parodied "novokomponovana muzika", in 1989, before dying of tumor in 1990. Bel Tempo, formed in 1986 by brother and sister Vlada and Suzana Petričević, released two pop rock albums with jazz elements before disbanding in 1992. Vampiri's sound was influenced by the 1950s doo-wop and rockabilly. However, with the breakout of the Yugoslav Wars, their sound seamed misplaced and the band disbanded in 1993. They reunited in 1995 and released the album Plavi grad, and, in 1997, Monkey Food, experimenting with different musical genres on the latter. However, the band disbanded once again in 1998.

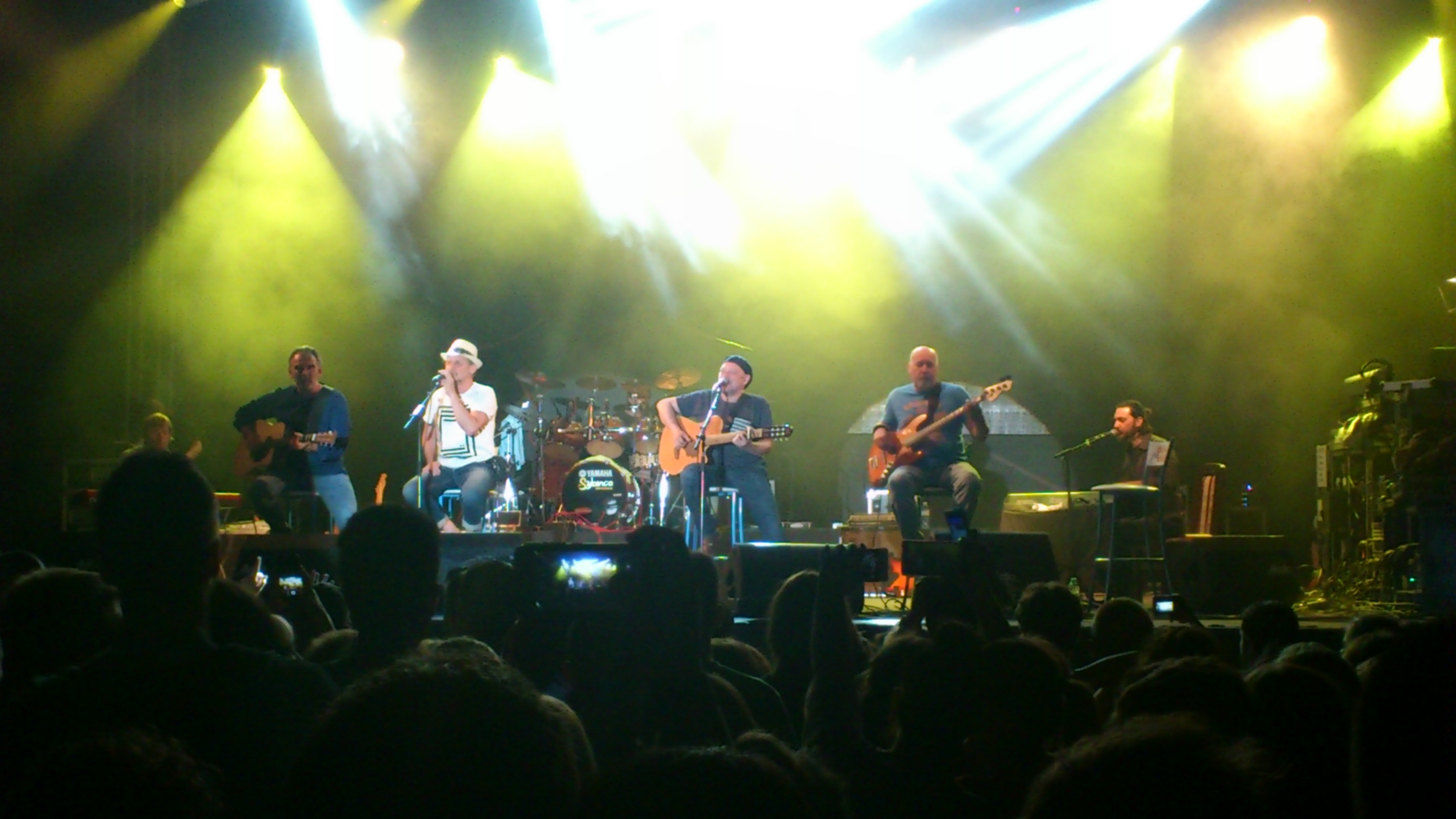
Galija performing in 2016

Popular rock acts of the late 1980s and the 1990s were Galija, Partibrejkers and Dejan Cukić. Galija, despite being formed in the late 1970s and initially performing progressive rock, reached the peak of popularity in the late 1980s and early 1990s with the album trilogy consisting of Daleko je Sunce (1988), Korak do slobode (1989), and Istorija, ti i ja (1991), entering the 1990s as one of the most popular Serbian rock bands. In the 1990s, Galija promoted the Socialist Party of Serbia, which had provoked a part of the critics and fans to proclaim Galija a "state band". Nevertheless, albums Karavan (1994), Trinaest (1996) and Voleti voleti (1997) were well received by majority of the fans. The garage/punk rock band Partibrejkers gained large popularity with the albums Partibrejkers I (1985), Partibrejkers II (1988), Partibrejkers III (1989) and Kiselo i slatko (1994). Former Bulevar and Bajaga i Instruktori vocalist Dejan Cukić started his solo career in the late 1980s, and forming his Spori Ritam Band started releasing a series of successful albums, Spori ritam (1987), Zajedno (1989), 1991 (1991) and Ja bih da pevam (1996).

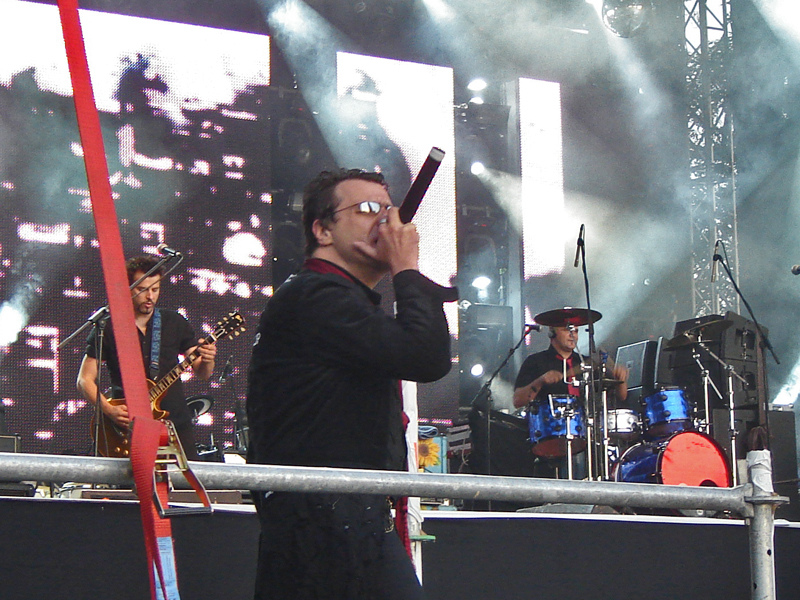
Van Gogh performing in 2007

Popular acts of the 1990s include Del Arno Band, Van Gogh, Babe, Prljavi Inspektor Blaža i Kljunovi, Familija, and the Belgrade fraction of the band Zabranjeno Pušenje. Pioneers of Serbian and former Yugoslav reggae scenes, Del Arno Band, formed in 1986, were always closely associated with the rock scene. Although they released only three full-length studio albums during twenty-five years of career, Del Arno Band managed to remain on top of Serbian reggae scene. The band Van Gogh started their career with the release of their debut self-titled album in 1986, but disbanded a year later. The band reunited in 1990, and throughout the 1990s released the albums Svet je moj (1990), Strast (1993), Hodi (1996) and Opasan ples (1999), which made them one of the most popular acts on the Serbian rock scene. Babe, starting in 1992 as a side project of Bajaga i Instruktori member Žika Milenković, Električni Orgazam member Goran Čavajda and Riblja Čorba member Zoran Ilić, with the release of their debut album Slike iz života jednog idota (1993) gained popularity with their humorous songs. After the departure of Čavajda, having released Slike sna i jave (Samo za buntovnike) (1999), Babe ended their activity. Another popular comedy rock band, Prljavi Inspektor Blaža i Kljunovi, formed by charismatic frontman Igor Blažević in 1993, quickly gained mainstream popularity with lyrics inspired by musical, film and sport stars. The band Familija was formed in 1994 by former Vampiri, U Škripcu and Košava members, and saw large popularity with their albums Narodno pozorište (1994) and Seljačka buna (1997), which featured ska/pop rock songs with humorous lyrics. With the outbreak of the Bosnian War the band Zabranjeno Pušenje from Sarajevo split into two factions, both named Zabranjeno Pušenje: the Sarajevo fraction, led by the original Zabranjeno Pušenje guitarist Sejo Sexon, and the Belgrade faction, led by the original Zabranjeno Pušenje vocalist Nele Karajlić. The Belgrade faction released the album Ja nisam odavle in 1997, and, after recording the soundtrack for the film Black Cat, White Cat by the director Emir Kusturica, moved towards world music, starting to perform with Kusturica under the name to The No Smoking Orchestra. The band saw large popularity outside Serbia, however, their new sound is better accepted abroad than in their home country.

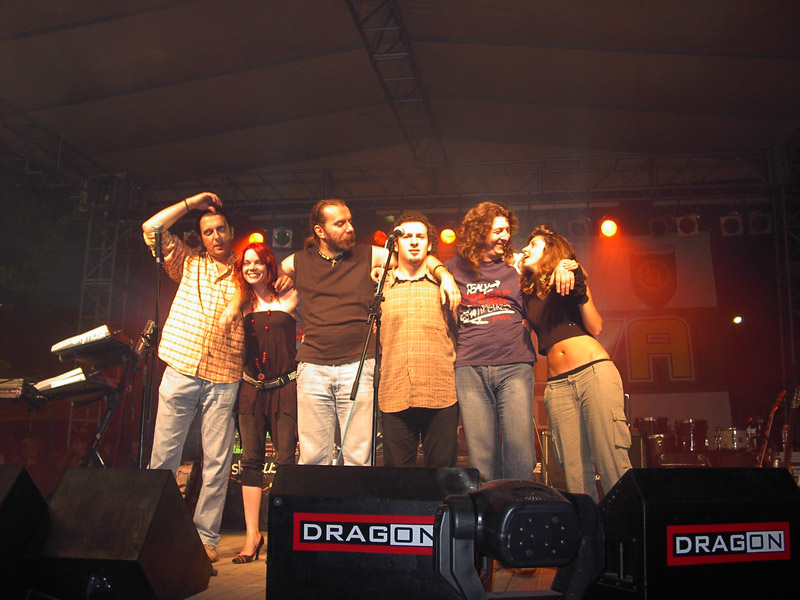
Neverne Bebe in 2007

The 2000s featured popular bands Negative, Neverne Bebe and Night Shift. The power pop band Negative, featuring the former Tap 011 vocalist Ivana Peters, formed in 1999, released several successful albums and had successful appearances on several musical festivals. Neverne Bebe, formed in 1993 by the keyboard player Milan Đurđević, having released three studio albums and having several lineup changes, released highly successful album Dvoje – The Best Of, featuring two female vocalists and featuring rerecorded versions of the band's old songs, after which they became one of the top mainstream acts of the Serbian scene. The post-grunge/hard rock band Night Shift, although formed in 1991, released their debut, successful cover album Undercovers in 2002. In 2009 the band released Bez zaklona which featured their own songs. Beside the mentioned bands, the veterans of the Serbian rock scene, YU Grupa, with their comeback Dugo znamo se (2005), Đorđe Balašević, with the albums Dnevnik starog momka (2001) and Rani mraz (2004), Riblja Čorba, with Pišanje uz vetar (2001), Ovde (2003), Trilogija (2007) and Minut sa njom (2009), Bajaga i Instruktori, with Zmaj od Noćaja (2001), Šou počinje u ponoć (2005) and Daljina, dim i prašina (2012), Električni Orgazam with Harmonajzer (2002) and To što vidiš to i jeste (2010), Galija with Dobro jutro, to sam ja (2005) and Mesto pored prozora (2010), Partibrejkers, with Gramzivost i pohlepa (2002) and Sloboda ili ništa (2007), and Van Gogh, with DrUnder (2002), Kolo (2006) and Lavirint (2009), maintained their popularity throughout the 2000s and early 2010s.

=== Acoustic rock (late 1960 – mid-1970s, early 1990s – present) ===
The Serbian acoustic scene emerged in the late 1960s with the appearance of the hippie subculture in Serbia, but reached its peak in the early 1970s with the bands Porodična Manufaktura Crnog Hleba, Vlada i Bajka, Lutajuća Srca, S Vremena Na Vreme, DAG, and Suncokret, most of them being a part of the Belgrade acoustic rock scene, naming themselves "akustičari" ("acousticans").

The pioneers of the Serbian acoustic rock scene were the bands Porodična Manufaktura Crnog Hleba, Vlada i Bajka and S Vremena Na Vreme. Porodična Manufaktura Crnog Hleba, which was also a theatre group, formed by Maja de Rado and Jugoslav Vlahović in 1968, released their only album Stvaranje in 1974, and disbanded in 1975. The duo Vlada i Bajka saw success with their early recordings, but disbanded in 1975. In 1993, the duo reunited, and recorded their first full-length album, Ja nisam ja (1994), which featured the hit song "Beograd", recorded with singers Bora Đorđević and Dušan Prelević, and actors Dragan Nikolić, Nikola Kojo and Dragan Bjelogrlić. Acoustic/progressive rock band S Vremena Na Vreme, formed in 1972, were, beside being a pioneers of the acoustic scene, one of the first former Yugoslav bands to incorporate traditional music elements into their music. The band's debut self-titled album, released in 1975, was widely praised by the critics. After releasing their third, electric-oriented album, Paviljon G in 1979, S Vremena Na Vreme disbanded. They reunited in 1993, releasing a studio and a live album, before disbanding once again in 1997.

Lutajuća Srca, formed in 1970 in Niš, released many 7-inch singles and four studio albums, and remains best known for their hits "Još malo", "Jefimija" and "Brod za sreću". DAG, formed in 1972, although a part of the Belgrade acoustic rock scene, used electric instruments on their only studio album Sećanja (1974). One of the last acoustic rock bands, Suncokret, appeared in 1975, featuring Bora Đorđević and Nenad Božić on acoustic guitars and vocals and two female vocalists, Biljana Krstić and Gorica Popović. The band started releasing folk music-inspired singles and, in 1977, released their only album, Moje bube. The following year, having written the song "Lutka sa naslovne strane", which the band refused to perform, Đorđević, together with Krstić, left the band, moving to Rani Mraz. Suncokret continued to perform with a changed lineup, led by female vocalist Snežana Jandrlić, until 1980 when they disbanded. Beside the mentioned bands, part of the Belgrade acoustic rock scene was the singer-songwriter Srđan Marjanović during the first several years of his career.

Throughout the 1980s, the acoustic scene did not exist, however, the appearance of the first unplugged concerts in the late 1980s introduced the popularity of acoustic music in the following decade. Bora Đorđević's and Arsen Dedić's 1987 unplugged performance in Terazije Theatre, released on the official bootleg album Arsen & Bora Čorba Unplugged `87, was one of the first unplugged concerts in Serbia and former Yugoslavia. However, it was in the 1990s that the Serbian rock acts started performing unplugged more often. The first official unplugged live album was released by the britpop band Eva Braun in 1993, and in the following year the Music Television of Serbia organized an unplugged festival in Belgrade Sava Centar. The recordings of Eva Braun, Rambo Amadeus, Laki Pingvini, Babe, Dejan Cukić, Milan Delčić, Du Du A, Del Arno Band, Kazna Za Uši, and others appeared on the various artists compilation Bez struje in 1995. During the 1990s, the unplugged concerts in Serbia were mainly organized by the Novi Sad television station NS Plus in Novi Sad Studio M. Influenced by the already popular MTV Unplugged, NS Plus Unplugged concerts of Dejan Cukić, Kerber, S Vremena Na Vreme, Električni Orgazam, Vlada Divljan & Old Stars Band and Garavi Sokak, all held in 1996, and Love Hunters, held in 1998, were released on live albums throughout the late 1990s. YU Grupa released only a part of their 1996 unplugged concert in Studio M, featuring Kornelije Kovač on piano, on their 2007 album Live. An unplugged album was also released by Generacija 5 in 2002, but their unplugged concert, held in 1995, was not a part of the NS Plus Unplugged series.

The 1990s also featured several notable acoustic non-live releases. The folk rock band Garavi Sokak, after the release of their 1994 acoustic-oriented album Slova tvoga imena, started performing on acoustic instruments only and turned towards pop sound. In 1996, the singer-songwriter Đorđe Balašević released acoustic folk rock-oriented album Na posletku....

During the 2000s, the acoustic music featured only a few notable releases. In 2000, Dejan Cukić recorded an acoustic Bob Dylan tribute Divlji med, featuring Serbian language lyrics. In 2002, Block Out leader Nikola Vranjković released a solo album Zaovdeilizaponeti, featuring lyrics from his book of the same title released with the CD. In 2002, Đorđe Balašević released the album Rani mraz, stylistically similar to Na posletku.... In 2002, the reformed Griva held an unplugged concert in Studio M, the recording of which was released on the album Griva & Co. — Live in 2010.

=== Singer-songwriters (early 1970s – present) ===
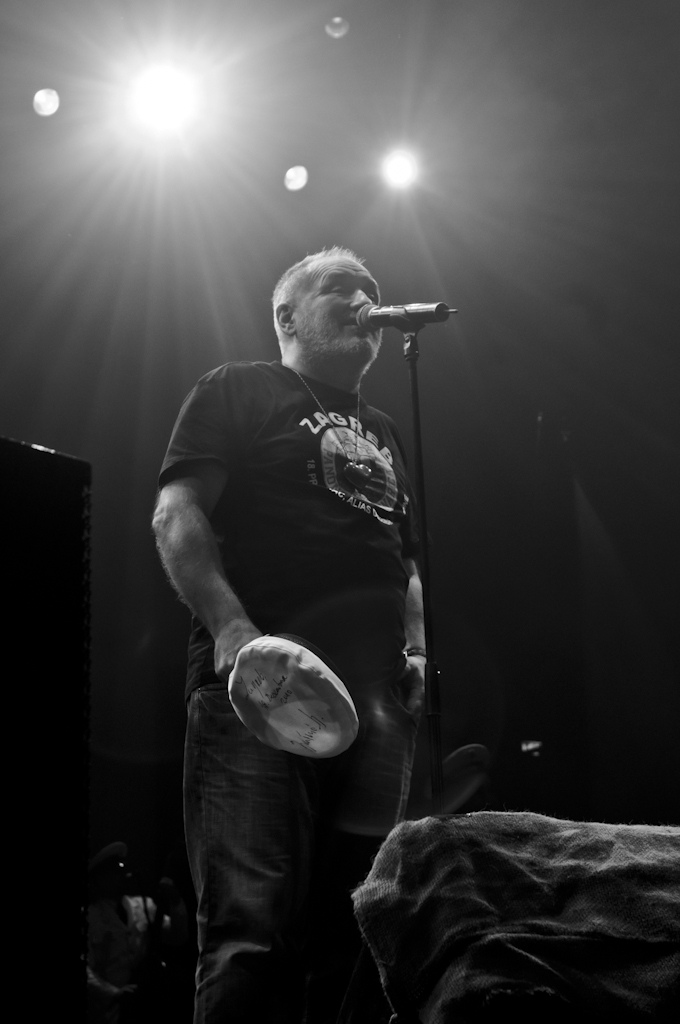
Đorđe Balašević performing in 2010

Serbian rock scene featured several notable singer-songwriters. One of the most important authors was Đorđe Balašević. He started his career in the 1970s as a member of the band Žetva and the leader of the band Rani Mraz, before starting, with the release of the album Pub (1982), a very successful solo career spanning up to the present. Despite the fact that his work in Žetva and Rani Mraz was mainly pop rock-oriented, in his later career he often used elements of rock, chanson and folk music, with some of his works, like Na posletku... (1996) and Rani mraz (2004) being entirely folk rock-oriented. Balašević's lyrics often dealt with humorous or political- and social-related themes.

Other notable singer-songwriters are Srđan Marjanović and Nikola Čuturilo. Initially a part of the Belgrade acoustic rock scene, Srđan Marjanović released his debut album Srđan Marjanović i prijatelji, which he recorded with members of YU Grupa, in 1974. During his career he released twelve studio albums. Nikola Čuturilo rose to fame as the guitarist for Riblja Čorba. He released his first solo album, 9 lakih komada (1988), while still a member of Riblja Čorba. He left the band in 1989, continuing his solo career which spans up to the present day.

=== Progressive and psychedelic rock (late 1960s – early 1980s) ===
Progressive rock dominated the Serbian rock scene throughout the 1970s, with the acts such as Dogovor iz 1804., Korni Grupa, YU Grupa, Smak, Pop Mašina, Dah, S Vremena Na Vreme, Opus, Tako, and Igra Staklenih Perli being the most notable representatives. With the emergence of the new wave scene at the beginning of the 1980s, Serbian progressive rock bands saw the decline of popularity and most of them ceased to exist.

Dogovor iz 1804. was short-lived, but played a pioneering role on a Yugoslav progressive rock scene as one of the first bands to move away from the 1960s rhythm and blues sound. They were followed by Korni Grupa. Formed in 1968 by Kornelije Kovač, the band had gone through many lineup changes and featured many famous musicians, including vocalists Dušan Prelević, Dalibor Brun, Dado Topić, Zdravko Čolić and Zlatko Pejaković. The band gained mainstream popularity with their simple pop-oriented songs, but moved towards progressive rock after they were joined by singer Dado Topić. Nevertheless, the band continued to record pop-oriented songs and represented Yugoslavia at the 1974 Eurovision Song Contest with the song "Moja generacija". In 1973, the band, under the name Kornelyans, released the symphonic rock-oriented English language album Not An Ordinary Life. Korni Grupa disbanded shortly after, but reunited in 1987 to perform at the Legende YU Rocka (Legends of YU Rock) concerts.

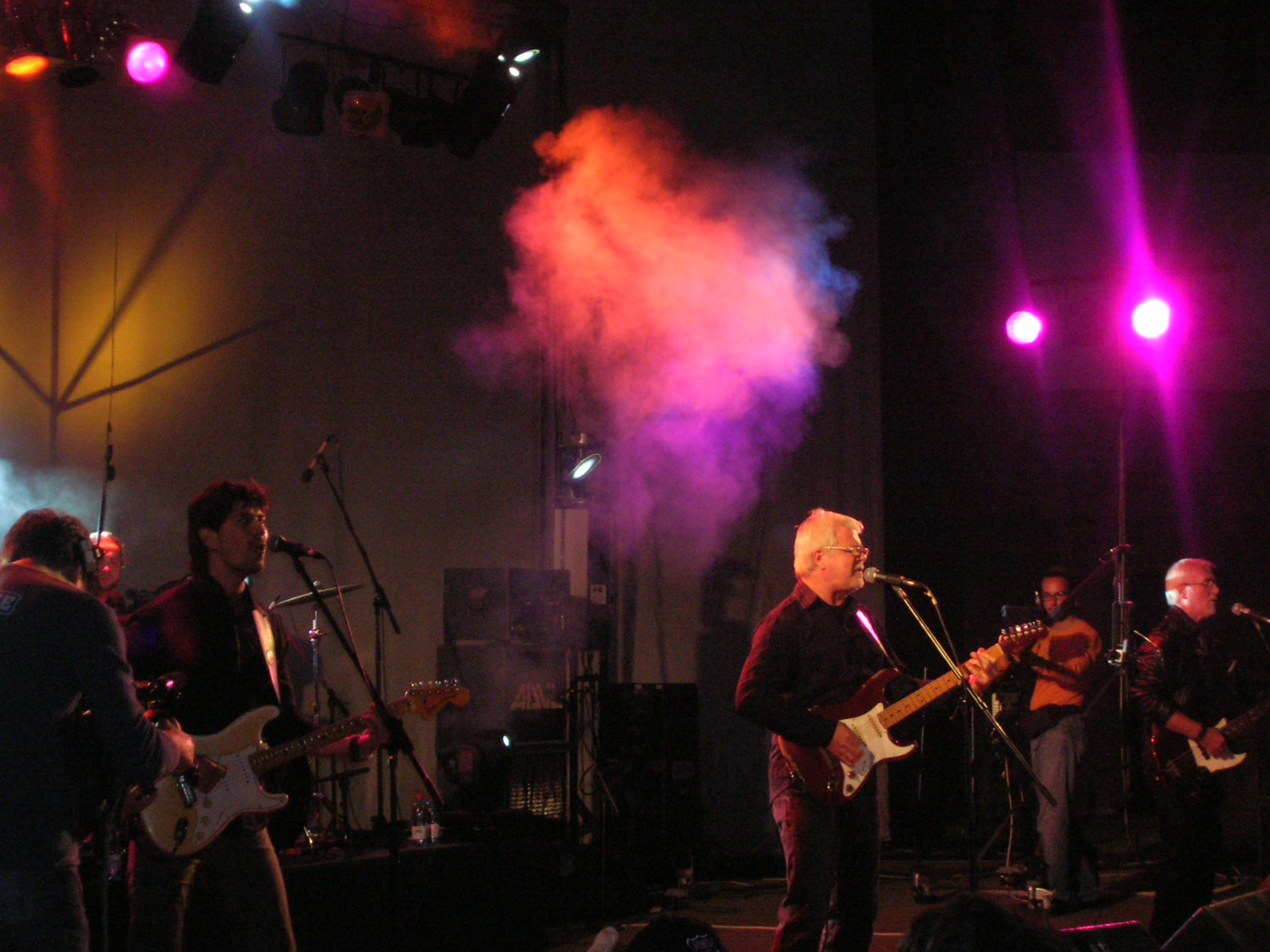
YU Grupa performing in 2007

YU Grupa, formed in 1970 by former Džentlmeni members, brothers Dragi and Žika Jelić, were one of the pioneers in incorporating elements of traditional music of the Balkans into rock, and achieved huge popularity with their fusion of progressive/hard rock and folk found on their 7-inch singles. Members of YU Grupa performed as a support band for guitarists Bata Kostić, Vedran Božić, Josip Boček and Goran Bregović on the Kongres rock majstora (Congress of Rock Masters) concert and album. YU Grupa disbanded in 1981, but reunited in 1987, continuing to record successful hard rock-oriented releases throughout the late 1980s, 1990s and the 2000s.

Smak, formed in 1971 by guitarist Radomir Mihajlović Točak, often considered one of the top and most influential guitarist on the former Yugoslav rock scene, and drummer Dejan Stojanović "Kepa", did not get a default lineup until 1975 by which time bassist Zoran Milanović, vocalist Boris Aranđelović and keyboard player Laza Ristovski consisted the official band membership. Smak performed jazz-influenced progressive rock, but also incorporated elements of folk, blues and hard rock into their sound. The band achieved huge popularity in the 1970s, with their releases Smak (1975), Satelit (1976), Crna dama (1977) and Stranice našeg vremena (1978). However, the band's popularity heavily declined at the beginning of the 1980s. Smak disbanded in 1981, and reunited and disbanded several times since.

Pop Mašina, formed in 1971, performed progressive/hard rock, but their debut album Kiselina (1973) also featured acid and psychedelic rock elements. The band released the first former Yugoslav live album, Put ka Suncu in 1976, and disbanded the following year. In 1981, the band's former members, Robert Nemeček and brothers Vidoja and Zoran Božinović, formed the hard rock/heavy metal band Rok Mašina.

S Vremena Na Vreme, formed in 1972, were one of the pioneers of the Yugoslav acoustic rock scene, but also incorporated progressive rock elements into their music. They were also one of the first former Yugoslav rock bands to incorporate folk music elements into their songs. The band's debut self-titled album, released in 1975, was widely praised by the critics. S Vremena Na Vreme disbanded in 1981, but reunited in 1993, and disbanded once again in 1997. Dah, formed in 1972 and led by guitarist Zlatko Manojlović, also combined progressive rock with folk. In 1975, Dah moved to Belgium and started a short-lasting international career under the name Land. After returning to Yugoslavia, the band recorded the album Povratak (1976) and disbanded shortly after. In 1977, Manojlović formed the progressive/hard rock band Gordi, which made a shift towards heavy metal in the 1980s.

The band Opus was formed in 1973 by former YU Grupa organist Miodrag Okrugić. The band disbanded after releasing only one symphonic rock-oriented album, Opus 1 (1975), with Dušan Prelević on vocals. Another symphonic rock-oriented act was the band Tako, formed in 1974, which performed a fusion of symphonic and jazz rock.

Progressive/psychedelic rock band Igra Staklenih Perli, formed in 1976, was one of the pioneers of the former Yugoslav psychedelic/space rock scene. The band released two studio albums, Igra Staklenih Perli (1979) and Vrt svetlosti (1980), before disbanding in 1985. In 2011, the band's former members Draško Nikodijević and Predrag Vuković, with a group of young musicians, formed the band Igra Staklenih Perli The Next Generation, releasing their debut album Apokaliptus in 2013.

Other notable bands that incorporated progressive rock elements into their music include Porodična Manufaktura Crnog Hleba, DAG, Galija and Neverne Bebe. Porodična Manufaktura Crnog Hleba, formed in 1968, and DAG, formed in 1972, were acoustic rock bands, but, as S Vremena Na Vreme, also incorporated progressive elements into their music. Galija, formed in 1977, released their debut, progressive rock-oriented album Prva plovidba in 1979. Although the band's several following releases featured similar progressive rock sound, the band started gradually turning towards mainstream rock, and reached the peak of popularity in the late 1980s and early 1990s. Neverne Bebe, formed in 1993, in the initial period of their career incorporated progressive rock elements into their music, but in the 2000s (decade) turned towards pop rock sound.

=== Hard rock and heavy metal (early 1970s – present) ===
Although some of the 1960s bands performed covers of songs by hard rock pioneers like Cream and Jimi Hendrix Experience, hard rock gained large popularity in the early 1970s with the works of progressive rock bands Pop Mašina, YU Grupa and Smak. Pop Mašina, formed in 1971, was one of the first Serbian and Yugoslav bands to move away from rhythm and blues towards harder sound. Their sound featured progressive, hard, psychedelic and acid rock elements. Pop Mašina disbanded in 1977. YU Grupa, formed in 1970, performed progressive/hard rock, and their songs often featured traditional music elements. The band disbanded in 1981, only to reunite in 1987. Since their comeback album, Od zlata jabuka (1987), their work has been mostly hard rock-oriented. Smak, formed in 1971, performed jazz-influenced progressive rock, but their sound often featured hard rock, blues and folk elements. The band moved towards more commercial hard rock at the beginning of the 1980s with the album Rock cirkus, but the album saw little success and the band disbanded shortly after, having constant reunions disbandments throughout the 1980s and 1990s.

The late 1970s featured the appearance of hard rock bands Generacija 5 and Riblja Čorba, the latter one becoming one of the most notable acts of Serbian and former Yugoslav rock scene. Generacija 5, formed in 1977, managed to gain a loyal fan base with their albums Generacija 5 (1980) and Dubler (1982), but disbanded in 1982. In 1985, the band's former leader, keyboardist Dragan Ilić wrote the music for the song "Za milion godina", which was recorded by a group of Yugoslav musicians (including former members of Generacija 5) as a contribution to Live Aid. Generacija 5 reunited in 1992, but has released only two studio albums since. Their 2006 album Energija featured Smak frontman Dejan Najdanović as guest vocalist on the entire album. In 1978, former Suncokret and Rani Mraz member Bora Đorđević and SOS members Miša Aleksić, Rajko Kojić and Vicko Milatović formed the hard rock band Riblja Čorba. After the recording of their debut hit single "Lutka sa naslovne strane" they were joined by guitarist Momčilo Bajagić (who, having left Riblja Čorba in 1984, formed the highly successful pop rock band Bajaga i Instruktori). Riblja Čorba debut album Kost u grlu (1979) saw huge success, and the band became very popular in a few months period. The albums Pokvarena mašta i prljave strasti (1981), Mrtva priroda (1981) and Buvlja pijaca (1982), the latter featuring softer sound than the band's first three releases, were also well received by fans and critics alike, and Ðorđević's provocative political- and social-related lyrics, caused him to become one of the most controversial musicians in Yugoslavia. The album Večeras vas zabavljaju muzičari koji piju (1984) was poorly received, and after its release Kojić and Bajagić were excluded from the band. However, the band triumphed with the following album, Istina (1985), recorded with guitarists Vidoja Božinović and Nikola Čuturilo. Although more heavy metal-oriented than any of the band's previous works and often considered Riblja Čorba's magnum opus, Istina was also the album after which the band, although still generally fitting into hard rock, started turning towards softer sound. However, the band managed to sustain their popularity and remained one of the most popular acts of the Serbian rock scene until today.

Kerber performing in 2011

The beginning of the 1980s saw the appearance of first traditional heavy metal releases, most notably by Gordi, Rok Mašina and Ratnici, and the new generation of hard rock bands, most notably Kerber, Griva and Balkan. In 1981, progressive/hard rock band Gordi, formed in 1977, released the album Pakleni trio which marked their shift towards heavy metal, making Gordi one of the first Serbian and former Yugoslav traditional heavy metal bands. Although only the last two Gordi albums, Pakleni trio and Kraljica smrti (1982), were heavy metal-oriented, these are generally considered the most notable Gordi releases and considered milestones on the Serbian and former Yugoslav heavy metal scenes. During the same year, former Pop Mašina members formed the short-lasting hard rock band Rok Mašina, which disbanded in 1982, after releasing only one album. A part of the material the band intended to release on their second studio album was released in 1983 on the heavy metal-oriented EP Izrod na granici. Hard rock band Kerber, formed in 1981, released their debut album Nebo je malo za sve in 1983, but it was their second album, Ratne igre (1984), that launched them to fame. The band's melodic hard rock sound was well received, and their following two albums, Seobe (1986) and Ljudi i bogovi (1988), kept them on the top of Yugoslav hard rock scene. However, in the late 1990s, the band went on hiatus, reactivating in the late 2000s. Hard rock band Griva, formed in 1982, saw commercial success after the release of their third album Griva (1987) which featured a combination of hard rock and glam metal with the traditional music of Vojvodina, disbanding in 1992. In 1982, Riblja Čorba drummer Vicko Milatović formed the heavy metal band Ratnici, which later changed the name to Warriors and, without Milatović, moved to Canada. In 1984, they recorded an album for the foreign market, but disbanded in 1986. In 1982, guitarist Aleksandar "Leki" Cvetković formed the hard rock band Balkan. Cvetković's social-related lyrics were heavily influenced by the lyrics of Bora Ðordevic and Azra leader Branimir Štulić. The band released four studio albums before disbanding in 1989.

The late 1980s featured the appearance of the band Love Hunters, female singer Viktorija, and the emergence of glam metal scene, with the bands Karizma and Osvajači being the most notable representatives. Love Hunters, formed in 1987, initially performed punk blues, but later moved towards hard rock. As their songs featured English language lyrics, during the first several years of existence the band did not manage to break through to mainstream media, but achieved mainstream popularity in the 1990s. Viktorija, known for her husky voice, started her career as a member of the girl group Aska, starting her solo career in 1988 with the album Spavaćeš sam. She combined pop rock, hard rock and glam metal and saw huge popularity in the late 1980s and early 1990s, before she semi-retired at the end of the 1990s. The band Karizma released two albums before disbanding at the beginning of the 1990s. The band Osvajači released their debut glam metal-oriented album Krv i led, which they recorded with Laza Ristovski on keyboards, in 1990, while their second album Sam (1995) marked the band's slight shift towards heavier sound. Osvajači disbanded in 1997, and reunited in 1999 with the new vocalist, releasing the album Vrelina, but disbanding a year later.

The late 1980s also saw the emergence of the first extreme metal acts, which saw little mainstream popularity in Serbia and former Yugoslavia in general during the 1980s. The thrash metal band Heller, formed in 1985, released arguably the first thrash metal album in South-Eastern Europe and was one of the pioneers of Serbian and former Yugoslav extreme metal scene. Another pioneer of the former Yugoslav extreme metal scene, speed/thrash metal band Bombarder, originally based in Sarajevo, moved to Belgrade after the beginning of the Bosnian War, where the band continued to record and perform.

The 1990s featured only several notable, mostly crossover thrash, metal acts: Sick Mother Fakers, Dead Ideas, and Svarog, the latter also being one of the pioneers of sludge and doom metal in Serbia. The 2000s saw the revival of the Serbian heavy metal scene and brought a variety of heavy metal genres, with most of the bands being gathered around Belgrade Radio 202. The most notable bands of the movement were the hard rock/heavy metal band Kraljevski Apartman, formed in 1995, and progressive/power metal band Alogia, formed in 2000, both gaining a large fanbase. The band Pero Defformero, which parodies turbo folk combining it with heavy metal and humorous lyrics, gained popularity in the 2000s, despite being active since the early 1990s. Another notable acts of the 2000s and 2010s include black metal bands May Result and The Stone, gothic metal band Abonos, death/doom metal band Rain Delay, industrial/alternative metal band Trigger, and others.

The 2000s also saw the revival of the hard rock scene. The hard rock band Cactus Jack, influenced by the 1970s hard rock, was formed in 1998, but saw their commercial success in the 2000s. The post-grunge/hard rock band Night Shift, even though formed in 1991, released their debut album Undercovers in 2002. The album, which featured covers of songs by various rock and pop artists, was well received by the audience and the critics, and the band moved towards writing their own songs, releasing their second album Bez zaklona in 2009. The second half of the decade featured the appearance of new hard rock acts, like Atlantida, Art Diler, Death Saw, and others.

=== Blues-rock (late 1970s – present) ===
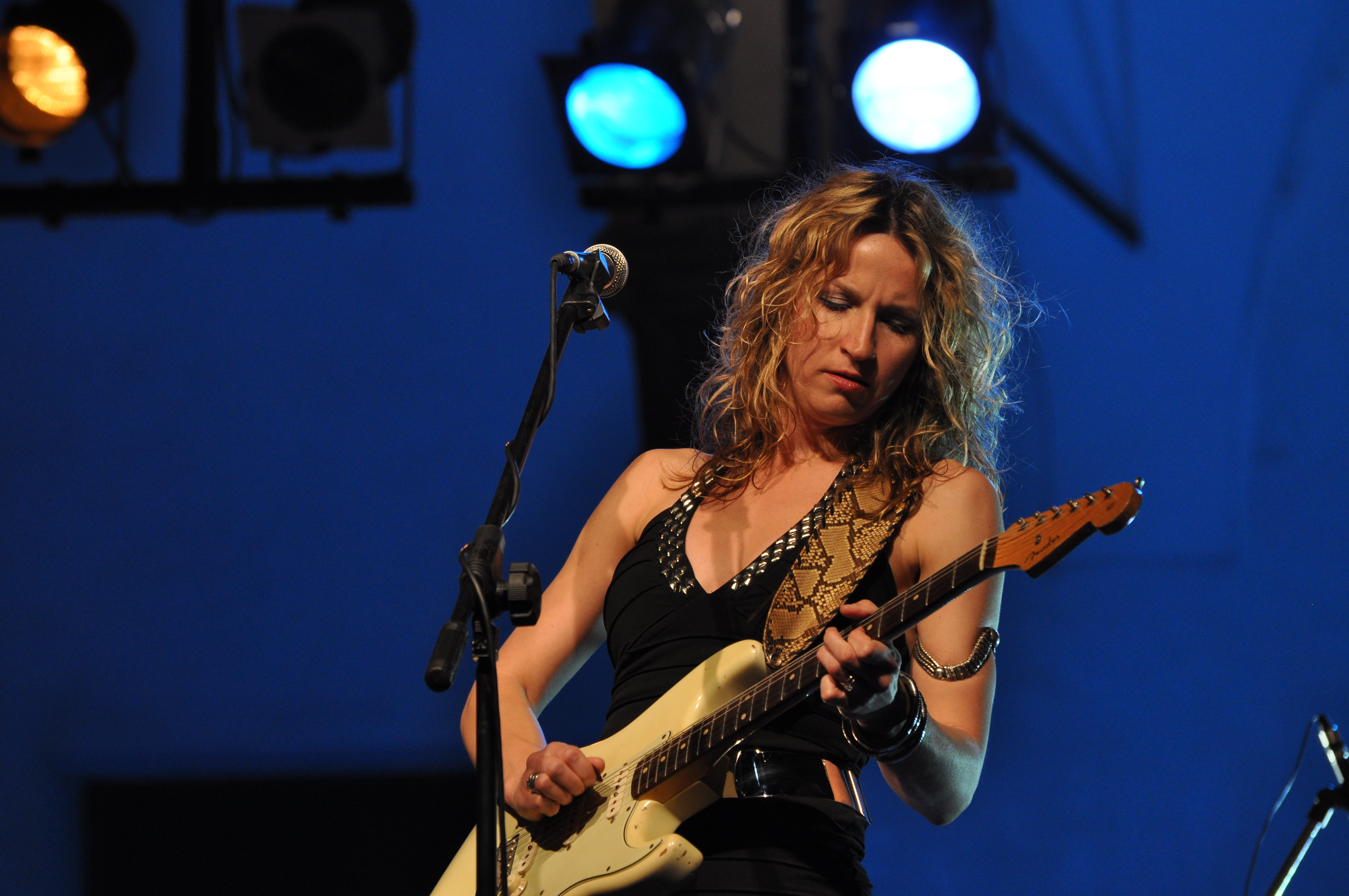
Ana Popović performing in 2010

Despite the facts that many 1960s rock bands, such as Crni Biseri, Daltoni, Elipse, and others performed rhythm and blues, and many 1970s progressive and hard rock bands, such as Pop Mašina, YU Grupa, Smak and Riblja Čorba, incorporated blues elements into their music, the first Serbian blues band, Blues Kvintet, was formed in 1979. They held their first concert at Mašinac club in Belgrade in spring of 1981, which is considered the first blues concert by a Serbian band.

During the 1980s many notable blues/blues-rock bands was formed: Sirova Koža (also known internationally as Raw Hide), formed in 1982; Point Blank and Blues Trio, both formed in 1983; Zona B, formed in 1987; Di Luna Blues Band, formed 1989. The band Hush, led by female guitarist Ana Popović, released their debut and only album Hometown in 1998. In 1999, Ana Popović moved to Netherlands and started a successful international career. The 2000s brought a new generation of blues rock bands: Šinobusi (formed in 2001), Texas Flood (formed in 2004), Cotton Pickers (formed in 2004), and others.

=== Punk rock, post-punk and gothic rock (late 1970s – present) ===
The development of punk rock in Serbia started in Novi Sad with the bands Pekinška Patka and Gomila G, both formed in 1978. Pekinška Patka, formed by vocalist Nebojša Čonkić, pronounced themselves "the first Orthodox punk rock band", which was against the attitude of the League of Communists of Yugoslavia, which promoted atheism. Another pioneer of punk rock in Serbia was the band Gomila G (this name being a censored version of Gomila Govana, trans. A Pile of Shit), also from Novi Sad. The band initially performed cover versions of Ramones and Sex Pistols songs, but soon started writing their own songs. Gomila G usually performed as an opening act for Pekinška Patka, and their appearance at the Celebration of the World War II liberation of Stepanovićevo in 1979, where the band performed the song "God Save Martin Bormann" and Čonkić of Pekinška Patka blown condoms on stage, made the media turn against the two bands, even asking for banning of their public appearances. Gomila G disbanded in 1980 as the band members, guitarist Žolt Horvat and drummer Robert Radić formed the first Serbian ska band, Kontraritam.

In the meantime, Pekinška Patka gained mainstream popularity and recorded their first releases. At the Subotica Festival Omladina they won the Audience Award and their whole performance was broadcast on national television, which was the first TV appearance of any punk rock band in Yugoslavia. The popularity of the band then gave them the opportunity to release two singles, and then a studio album, Plitka poezija, the first punk rock album by a Serbian band, released in 1980 by Jugoton. After the album release, the lineup changed, and the arrival of the young Zoran "Bale" Bulatović on guitar, brought the stylistic changes, firstly moving towards new wave, and eventually to post-punk. The band's second album Strah od monotonije is considered the first post-punk release in Serbia and former Yugoslavia. After the album release, the band disbanded.

The appearance of the first post-punk album on the Serbian scene influenced appearance of post-punk and gothic rock bands and releases. Zoran "Bale" Bulatović (guitar) and Marko "Mare" Vukomanović (bass guitar), both from Pekinška Patka, with La Strada members Slobodan Tišma (vocals) and Ivan Fece Firchie (drums) formed the first gothic rock band in Serbia, Luna, releasing only one album, Nestvarne stvari (1984). Beside Luna, the notable gothic rock act was also Trivalia from Niš, formed in the second half of the 1980s. Gothic rock, however, saw little popularity in Serbia. Another Niš band, post-punk/darkwave band Dobri Isak, released their only album Mi plačemo iza tamnih naočara in 1983. The album, which was one of the first albums in Serbia released through an independent record label, saw little success at a time of its release, but saw critical acclaim when it was rereleased in 2009. Other bands which featured the post-punk/gothic rock influences were the new wave bands Električni Orgazam, on their second album Lišće prekriva Lisabon (1982), and Idoli, on their debut Odbrana i poslednji dani (1982), and the alternative rock band Ekatarina Velika, firstly called Katarina II, on the albums Katarina II (1984), Ekatarina Velika (1985) and S' vetrom uz lice (1986).

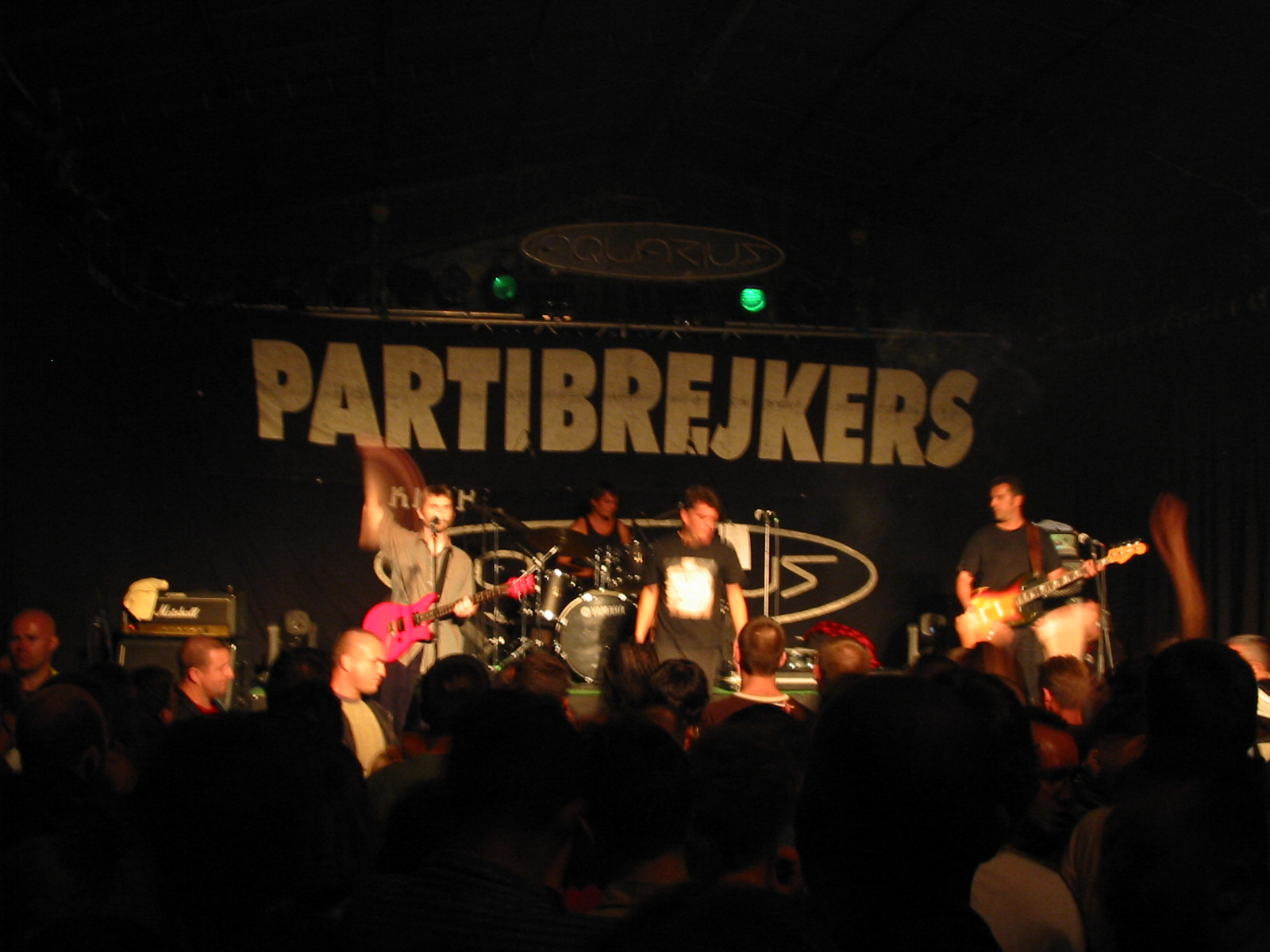
Partibrejkers performing in 2003

The second generation of punk rock acts in Serbia featured Partibrejkers, Kazna Za Uši and Toni Montano from Belgrade. Serbian garage punk band Partibrejkers, formed in 1982, brought the public's attention to themselves with their live appearances and musical style, even as a demo act. The band was formed by former Urbana Gerila and Radnička Kontrola frontman, Zoran Kostić "Cane" and guitarist Nebojša Antonijević "Anton", the two being the mainstay members of the band. By the time the band released their debut, self-titled album, in 1985, they already gained much popularity, kept through their later successful releases Partibrejkers II (1988), Partibrejkers III (1989), Kiselo i slatko (1994) and Ledeno doba (1997), entering the 2000s as one of the top mainstream acts of the Serbian rock scene. In 1986, another prominent garage punk band was formed, Kazna Za Uši, but the band became prominent in the 1990s, winning the first place at Gitarijada festival in 1992 and releasing their debut Ispod zemlje in the same year. During the mid-1980s the former vocalist of the punk rock band Radost Evrope, Velibor Miljković performed as a solo act using the pseudonym Toni Montano, and his albums featured a combination of punk rock and rockabilly, also found on his future releases.

Other prominent representatives of the second generation of punk rock bands in Serbia featured Kragujevac bands KBO! and Trula Koalicija, both formed by Saša "Vuja" Vujić. Vujić formed KBO! in 1982, and their first recordings were released by foreign record labels, which was also the case with their first official studio album, Forever punk (1989). The band performed in many foreign countries, and also formed their own independent record label, KBO! Records, which released the band's demo recordings and studio albums. Vujić also formed the band Trula Koalicija in 1986 with the vocalist Predrag "Skaki" Drčelić.

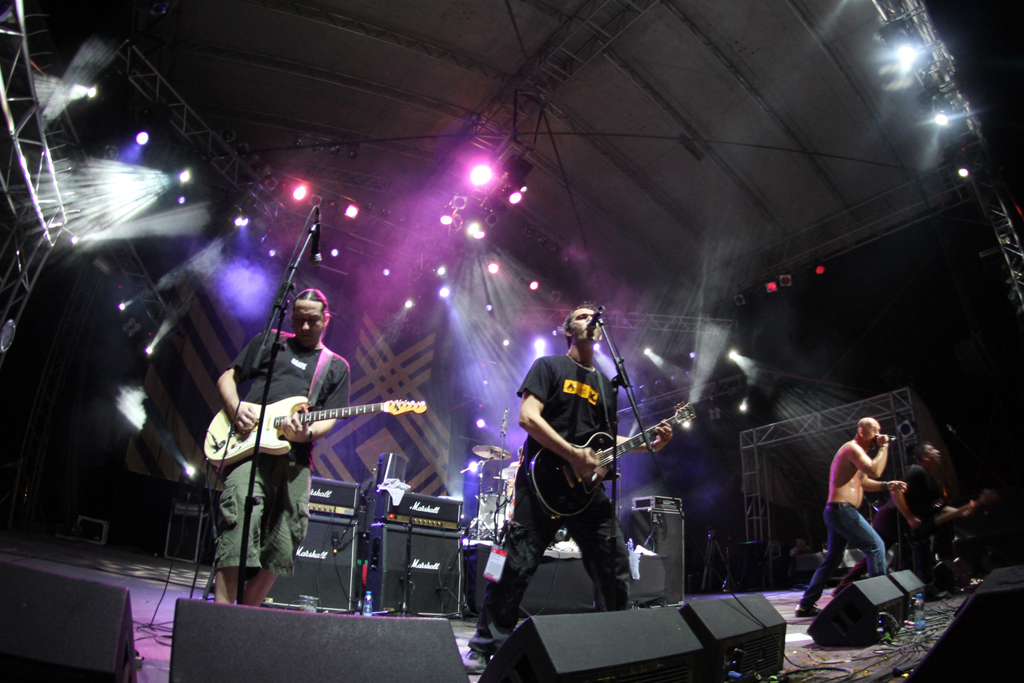
Goblini performing in 2012

Punk rock continued to be popular in the 1990s with the appearance the bands Atheist Rap and Zbogom Brus Li from Novi Sad, Goblini from Šabac, Džukele from Subotica and Novembar from Niš. Atheist Rap's sound, a combination of punk rock with humorous lyrics found on their studio albums Maori i Crni Gonzales (1992), Ja eventualno bih ako njega eliminišete (1996) and II liga zapad (1998), was described by the band themselves as "happy punk". Zbogom Brus Li combined punk rock and folk music of Vojvodina into a style the band describes as "tamburaški punk" ("tamburitza punk") on their albums Penk Punk Pink Pank Ponk (1995) and Zlobro (1997). The band Goblini was formed in 1992, and with the release of their first two studio albums, Goblini (1994) and Istinite priče I deo (1994), the band had become a live attraction, performing in Serbia and abroad. On their third studio album U magnovenju (1996), the band was joined by Leonid Pilipović from the band Džukele. After the album release, Pilipović returned to his own band, which, having released their debut Gledajući u mrak in 1994 and the second album Zubato Sunce in 1998, disbanded. Punk rock band Novembar released three studio albums, Deguelo (1994), Blues južne pruge (1997), and Licem prema zemlji in (2000) featuring the band's combination of American guitar oriented rock sound combined with punk rock, pop punk and new wave influences.

The 2000s featured disbandment and reunions of many punk rock groups. In 2001, Goblini disbanded, reuniting in 2010. In 2002, Džukele, Novembar and Trula Koalicija disbanded, but the latter two reformed a few years later, Trula Koalicija with a new lineup in 2005, and November in 2007, releasing a new album, Radulizam in 2008. Džukele guitarist and vocalist Slobodan Vukosavljević formed the garage rock band Nafta, which released the albums Samo senke prolaze (2008) and Alternator (2011). In 2004, at the EXIT festival, gothic rock band Luna reunited in the original lineup, and, four years later at the same festival, the original Pekinška Patka lineup reunited to perform at the festival main stage, alongside Sex Pistols. The band announced the release of a cover album, featuring songs performed at the Yugoslav 1960s pop festivals.

=== New wave (late 1970s – early 1980s) ===
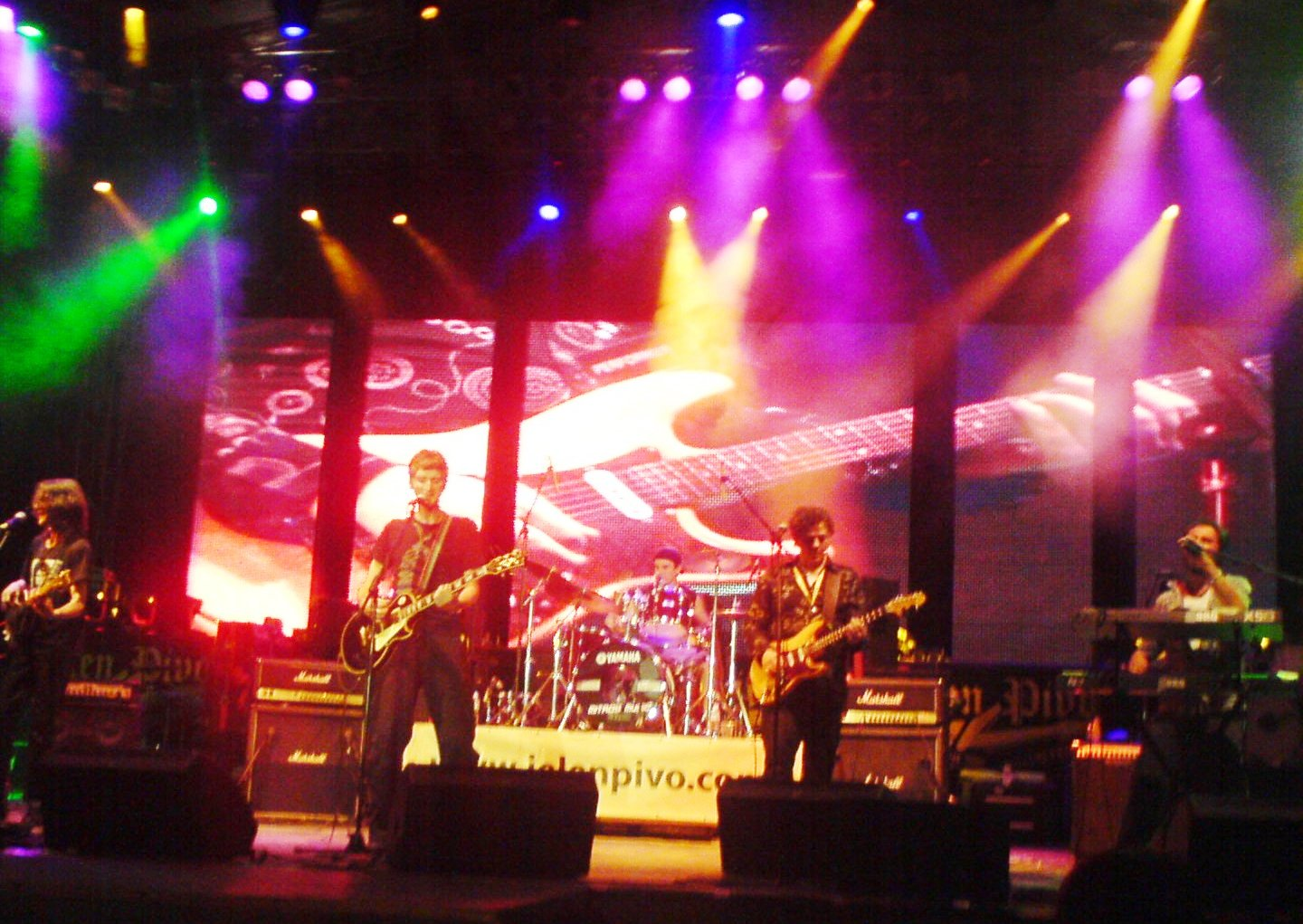
Električni Orgazam performing in 2008

The origin of the new wave scene in Serbia can be found in Belgrade 1970s bands Zvuk Ulice, Limunovo Drvo and Hipnotisano Pile. The three bands featured the future members of the Serbian new wave bands Idoli, Šarlo Akrobata and Električni Orgazam. Zvuk Ulice member Vlada Divljan, with two friends, Nebojša Krstić and Srđan Šaper formed a conceptual band VIS Dečaci in 1979, whose photographs appeared in the Vidici youth magazine and attracted media's attention. The band soon included bassist Zdenko Kolar, also from Zvuk Ulice, and drummer Boža Jovanović and was renamed to Idoli, in 1980. Limunovo Drvo, featuring guitarists Milan Mladenović and Dragomir Mihajlović "Gagi", performed hard rock for two years, before adopting the new wave and punk rock musical style on the arrival of the bassist Dušan Kojić "Koja" and drummer Ivan Vdović "VD". After the departure of Mihajlović, the band was renamed to Šarlo Akrobata. Električni Orgazam was formed as an ad hoc band of the melodic hard rock band Hipnotisano Pile. The band was formed to perform at the 1980 Palilula Culture Olympics as an opening act for Hipnotisano Pile. Guitarist Ljubomir Jovanović "Jovec" was to play the drums and the drummer Srđan Gojković "Gile" was to play guitar and sing lead vocals. The band gained the public's attention at the performances and, soon after, the band ended their activity as Hipnotisano Pile and continued as Električni Orgazam.

Idoli, Šarlo Akrobata and Električni Orgazam had their first recordings released on the compilation Paket aranžman, today considered one of the most prominent Serbian and Yugoslav rock releases, and by the time the compilation was released, the bands had already started working on their debut albums. The promotional video for Idoli song "Maljčiki" which followed the release of the compilation featured a parody of soc-realist iconography. It was broadcast for the first time at the New Year's Eve on the then-popular Rokenroler show on the national television, and the Soviet embassy sent a protest note to the TV and radio stations which broadcast the song and some of them banned it. During the same show, for the first time were broadcast the promotional videos for Električni Orgazam's "Krokodili dolaze" and Šarlo Akrobata's "Niko kao ja", all three appearing on the compilation. Idoli released their self titled EP in 1981 and Odbrana i poslednji dani in 1982, the latter polled in 1998 as the greatest Yugoslav popular music album in the book YU 100: najbolji albumi jugoslovenske rok i pop muzike, Električni Orgazam released their self titled debut in 1981 and post-punk oriented Lišće prekriva Lisabon in 1982, and Šarlo Akrobata released their only album, Bistriji ili tuplji čovek biva kad... in 1981. Električni Orgazam and Šarlo Akrobata also had short tours in Poland and the Polish bands recorded a tribute to the Yugoslav rock bands, including cover versions of Idoli and Električni Orgazam songs, released on the 2001 album Yugoton. By 1983, Idoli and Električni Orgazam had moved towards mainstream pop and rock, and Šarlo Akrobata disbanded.

Due to the success of Paket aranžman, Jugoton wanted to release another compilation featuring the new new wave and punk rock acts from Belgrade. The compilation Artistička radna akcija, released in 1981, featured Radnička Kontrola, Bezobrazno Zeleno, Profili Profili, Defektno Efektni, Urbana Gerila, Petar i Zli Vuci, U Škripcu, Pasta ZZ, VIA Talas and TV Moroni, each with two songs, but it did not repeat the success of the previous compilation. Half of the bands did not release any other recordings except the ones on the compilation. Bezobrazno Zeleno released two pop rock-oriented studio albums, Profili Profili released a split album with Kazimirov Kazneni Korpus, Petar i Zli Vuci released two singles, U Škripcu released several studio albums and gained mainstream popularity moving to synthpop and pop rock, and VIA Talas released one studio album before disbanding in 1982.

Other notable new wave acts include Belgrade acts Bulevar, fronted by later Bajaga i Instruktori vocalist and solo singer Dejan Cukić, which released two albums, Loš i mlad (1981) and Mala noćna panika (1982), Piloti, which released albums Piloti (1981) and Dvadeset godina (1982) before disbanding, turning towards pop rock after their 1987 reunion, and Kozmetika, which released only one album, Kozmetika (1983), and Novi Sad act Čista Proza, which released only one album, Čista Proza (1983). Initial works of the bands Laki Pingvini and Zana were new wave-oriented, but these acts later moved towards more commercial pop rock and synthpop. During the early 1980s, new wave influences were present in the works of Grupa I, Du Du A, Pekinška Patka, Kontraritam, Doktor Spira i Ljudska Bića, La Strada, Obojeni Program and Gjurmët, as well as in the works of some acts that gained popularity in the 1970s, most notably Slađana Milošević and Laboratorija Zvuka.

=== Synthpop (early 1980s – mid-1980s) ===
One of the first Serbian synthpop acts was the band Beograd, which were also one of the pioneers of the former Yugoslav electronic music scene. The band was formed in 1981, and in 1983 released their only album Remek depo, which featured a combination of synthpop and brass instrument-oriented soul.

With the decline of the new wave scene around 1982, some new wave bands, like U Škripcu and Zana, moved towards synthpop. Artistička radna akcija participant U Škripcu, having started as a conceptual new wave band in 1980, moved towards synth music. The band's debut album Godine ljubavi (1982), featuring several hit songs, was followed by even more successful O je! (1983) and the EP Nove godine (1983). However, on their later releases, the band turned towards electropop sound, which, having proved unsuccessful, led them to disband. Despite two reunion comeback albums (in 1987 and 1990), the band could not repeat the early success. In the 1990s, the band's vocalist Milan Delčić "Delča" formed the electronic rock band Delča & Sklekovi. Zana, named after the band's vocalist Zana Nimani, having released their debut album Loše vesti uz rege za pivsku flašu (1981), made a shift towards radio-friendly pop rock, New Romantic and synthpop sound with the release of their second album Dodirni mi kolena (1982). Despite the success of Dodirni mi kolena and the following album, Natrag na voz (1983), vocalist Nimani left the band. The rest of the band continued performing as Zana, changing several vocalists and gradually turning towards pop music.

Other notable synthpop acts include bands Laki Pingvini, D' Boys and Jakarta. Laki Pingvini, despite working occasionally and with an unsteady lineup since 1979, gained mainstream popularity in 1983 with the debut EP Šizika. Their debut album Muzika za mlade (1984) was also successful, however, their later releases did not repeat the previous success. The band disbanded in 1989, but had short reunions in 1994, 1995 and 2006. The duo D' Boys featuring a former VIA Talas member Miško Petrović (also known as Miško Plavi) and a former West German krautrock group Jane member Predrag Jovanović (also known as Peđa D'Boy), was formed in 1982. With the albums Ajd' se zezamo (1984) and Muvanje (1985), the band became popular with humorous lyrical style, featuring kitschy and frivolous motifs dealing with nightlife, parties and girls. The band disbanded in 1985, with Jovanović forming a short lived Peđa D'Boy Band and later pursuing a solo career, and Petrović joining Piloti and then Ekatarina Velika, and later taking up playing accordion and forming his Miško Plavi Band. The band Jakarta, formed in 1981, released their synth-funk-oriented debut album Maske za dvoje in 1984, featuring several hits. However, the band moved towards pop rock on their second album Bomba u grudima (1986).

=== Funk rock (early 1980s – present) ===
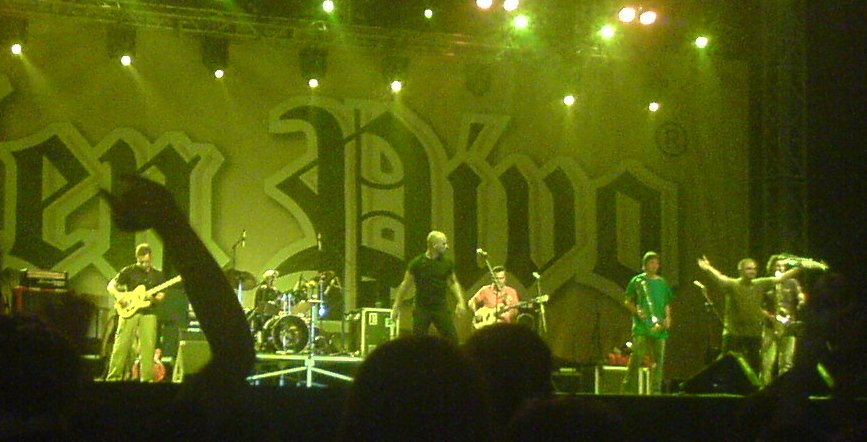
Deca Loših Muzičara performing in 2007

Funk rock in Serbia appeared in the 1980s with the bands Jakarta, Heroina and Oktobar 1864. Formed in 1981, Jakarta released their synth-funk-oriented debut album Maske za dvoje in 1984, featuring several hits. However, despite the success of the first album, the band moved towards pop rock on their second album Bomba u grudima, which was not well received by the fans, and the band ceased to exist in 1986. The band Heroina, formed in 1982, featured Zoran Janjetov, at the time already a well-known comic book artist, as vocalist. Their debut and only studio album, Heroina, released in 1985, featured a mixture of funk and art rock. Oktobar 1864, formed in 1984 and featuring the female vocalist Tanja Jovićević, released their debut self-titled album, released in 1987, featuring several hit songs. On their two following albums Igra bojama (1988), and Crni ples (1990), they successfully combined funk rock with jazz and pop elements. Despite the successful career, they disbanded in 1992 and Tanja Jovićević pursued a solo career as a jazz and funk musician. In 2005, she started collaborating with the funk band Rich Bitch and with them, in 2008, released the album 10. During the 1980s, funk influences could also be found in the works of Idoli and Disciplina Kičme.

In the following decades funk rock was again popularized in Serbia with the appearance of Deca Loših Muzičara and Plejboj in the 1990s. Formed in 1988, Deca Loših Muzičara played a combination of funk and rock, found on their albums Dobar dan (1992), and Prolećni dan (1995). In 1998, the band wrote music for the Virus theater play, in which the main character was played by the actor Ivan Jevtović, who, after the release of their 2005 studio album ...gde cveta Samsung žut, joined the band as a new vocalist, replacing Aleksandar Siljanovski. Plejboj, formed in 1992, combined funk and soul with ska, punk rock, jazz fusion and pop rock on their albums Sviraj dečko (1994) and Overdrive (1997).

=== Alternative rock (early 1980s–present) ===
The alternative rock scene developed in the early 1980s with the decline of the new wave scene, when a part of the new wave scene became the base of the future Serbian alternative rock scene. The pioneers of alternative rock can be found in Novi Sad bands Laboratorija Zvuka, with their eccentric style, erotic lyrics, unusual line ups and bizarre circus-inspired stage performances, La Strada, featuring the poet Slobodan Tišma on guitar and vocals, Obojeni Program, featuring former Urbana Gerila vocalist Branislav "Kebra" Babić, and the girl band Boye whose debut album Dosta! Dosta! Dosta! (1988) was the first Serbian all-female release since the 1960s.

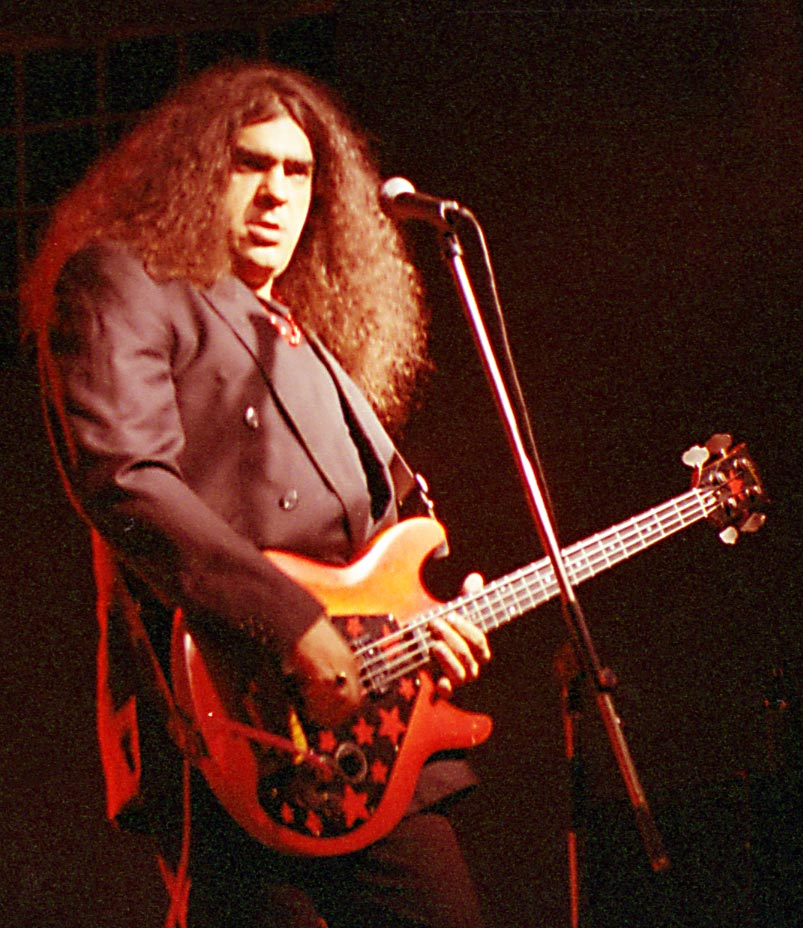
Disciplina Kičme leader Dušan Kojijć "Koja" performing in 2000

In Belgrade, former Šarlo Akrobata members Dušan Kojić and Milan Mladenović formed two of the most notable bands of the alternative rock scene in Serbia, Disciplina Kičme and Ekatarina Velika. Former Šarlo Akrobata bassist and vocalist Dušan Kojić Koja, formed the band Disciplina Kičme in 1982. The band, in the initial period consisting only of Kojić and the drummer Srđan "Žika" Todorović, combining influences from punk rock, funk, jazz fusion, motown, jungle, and the works of Jimi Hendrix. During the early 1990s, the band moved to London and changed the name to Discipline A Kitschme, performing with female vocalist, African-American singer Gofie Bebe, only to return to Serbia in the mid-2000s. Ekatarina Velika, having at first called Katarina II, featured former Šarlo Akrobata and Limunovo Drvo guitarists Milan Mladenović and Dragomir Mihajlović. Having released their post-punk influenced records, the band moved to a more guitar-oriented alternative rock, found on their releases Ljubav (1987), Samo par godina za nas (1989), and Dum dum (1991). Another prominent figure of the Serbian alternative rock scene, Mitar Subotić, also known as Rex Illusivi, a composer, producer and one of the pioneers of electronic music in Serbia, was closely associated with the works of Ekatarina Velika. In 1985, Subotić, Mladenović and Goran Vejvoda started the short-lived project Dah Anđela. At the about same time, Subotić was closely associated with the work of the art rock band Heorina, which featured comic book artist Zoran Janjetov on vocals. In 1990, Subotić moved to São Paulo, Brazil, where he worked as a musician and producer. In 1994, Subotić and Mladenović, with a group of Brazilian musicians, reactivated the project as Angel's Breath, releasing the album Angel's Breath in 1994.

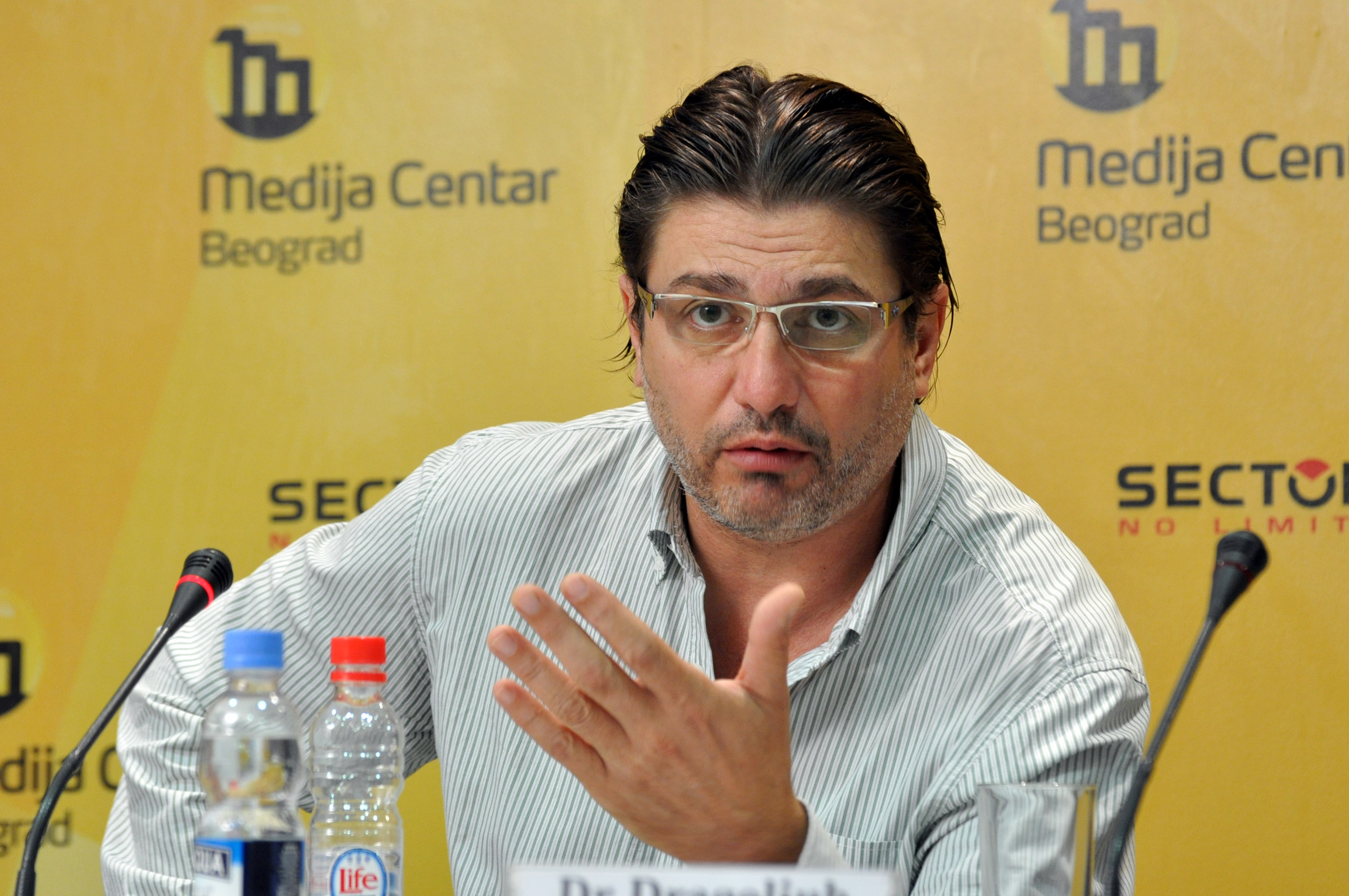
Rambo Amadeus in 2013

The second half of the 1980s brought the formation of the prominent alternative rock acts which gained the mainstream popularity with their works during the 1990s, Van Gogh and Rambo Amadeus. Despite the fact that Van Gogh, formed by guitarist Zvonimir Đukić "Đule", released their debut self-titled album in 1986, which was also the year of their formation, it was in the early 1990s that the band which, having disbanded, and reformed in 1990, became successful with the albums Svet je moj (1991), Strast (1993), Hodi (1996), and Opasan ples (1999). In the 2000s the band moved towards more commercial sound, and established themselves as one of the top mainstream acts on the Serbian rock scene. The Belgrade-based Montenegrin singer-songwriter Antonije Pušić, who works under the pseudonym Rambo Amadeus, with his debut album O tugo jesenja (1988), created the unique combination of different musical styles, including jazz, rock, and folk music, which he called "turbo folk". The term was later used for the subgenere of the folk music from the Balkans. Pušić continued in the same manner on his later releases also making influence on the Serbian hip hop scene with the albums Hoćemo gusle (1989) and Psihološko propagandni komplet M-91 (1991).

The beginning of the 1990s featured the prominent alternative rock acts: Dža ili Bu, Darkwood Dub, Presing, Kanda, Kodža i Nebojša, and Block Out from Belgrade, Obojeni Program from Novi Sad and Bjesovi from Gornji Milanovac. Dža ili Bu, formed in 1987, featuring a combination hard rock and punk rock, with their 1992 album Hej mornari presented the political situation in the country with their ironical lyrical style. Darkwood Dub, formed in 1988, performed a combination of electronic music and rock. Presing, formed in 1990, combined post rock, soul, free jazz and krautrock. Kanda, Kodža i Nebojša, formed in 1991, performed a combination of rock, jazz and reggae. Block Out, formed in 1991, initially inspired by various diverse bands and grunge/hard rock-oriented, after the release of Crno, belo i srebrno (1994) started to move towards a darker, heavier atmosphere and sound under Nikola Vranjković's songwriting, combining elements of doom metal, psychedelic rock, hard rock and punk rock with social-related lyrics. Obojeni Program, although formed in 1980, released their debut album Najvažnije je biti zdrav in 1990. Bjesovi, formed in 1989, combining grunge, hard rock, psychedelic rock and doom metal, released their debut U osvit zadnjeg dana in 1991, but achieved success with the release of their second, self-titled album, released in 1992.

The mid-1990s featured the disbandment of Ekatarina Velika, and the formation of the bands Supernaut, 357, Jarboli, Kristali and E-Play. The band Supernaut, featuring former Radnička Kontrola member Srđan Marković, influenced by Suicide, wrote plays and performed a combination of art exhibitions, theater plays and rock concerts. 357 performed a combination of hard rock, rap rock, Serbian folk and reggae, combined with socially critical lyrical style. Jarboli, a guitar-oriented club band formed in 1993, independently released the prominent album Čizmanoga, but after the album release, moved to a more softer rock sound, found on their later releases. Kristali, like Jarboli, were formed in 1993, and combined the simple pop rock song structures backed with brass sections, making a communicative musical performance found on their releases Kristali and Dolina ljubavi. E-Play, featuring a majority of female members, combined alternative rock with various electronic music genres.

The 2000s brought new alternative rock acts, large number of them usually denoted as Nova srpska scena (New Serbian Scene).

=== Oi!, ska, hardcore and pop punk (late 1980s–present) ===
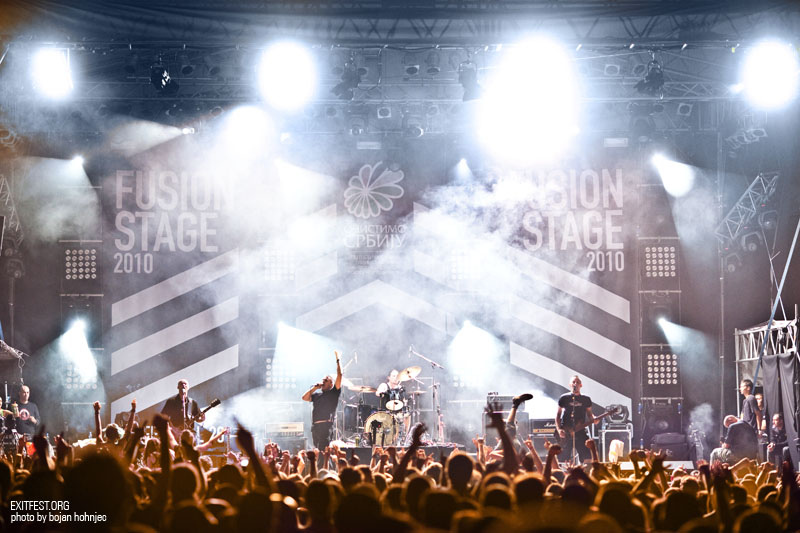
Ritam Nereda performing in 2010

The late 1980s brought a variety of punk rock bands and genres on the Serbian scene and the Oi!, ska, hardcore punk and pop punk bands emerged from the local demo scenes to the major record labels and nationwide popularity.

The Oi! scene, with Ritam Nereda and Direktori, quickly found the way to the fans with their political-related lyrics, aggressive music and effective live performances. Direktori, unlike Ritam Nereda, were also turned towards ska music, which became very popular on the Serbian scene. Even though ska appeared in the early 1980s with the band Kontraritam, formed in 1980, which released only one album before disbanding in 1983, it was only with the bands like Plejboj and Familija that it gained a vast number of fans. Plejboj, formed in 1992, gained popularity with their combination of punk rock, ska, soul, funk, jazz fusion, and pop rock, found on their albums Sviraj dečko (1994) and Overdrive (1997). Familija, formed in 1994, gained popularity with their ska/pop rock songs with humorous lyrics found on their albums Narodno pozorište (1994) and Seljačka buna (1998). However, despite the success of the releases, they disbanded in 1998. In 2003, the band's former vocalist Dejan Pejović formed the band The Dibidus, whose albums The Dibidus (2003) and Trenerka i sako (2011) were stylistically similar to the works of Familija.

Hardcore punk scene, founded in the late 1980s, gained the mainstream popularity in the 1990s with the bands Sick Mother Fakers from Belgrade, which were one of the pioneers of the genre in Serbia, Ništa Ali Logopedi from Šabac, which featured accordion-oriented Serbian folk music combined with hardcore punk, the rapcore band Sunshine from Belgrade, which combined rap and hardcore punk with sexually overt lyrics, and the hardcore punk/metalcore band Overdrive from Zrenjanin. One of the most popular bands of the genre was Eyesburn, a brass-oriented combination of hardcore punk and reggae music. The band's growing popularity with the releases of Fool Control /2000) and later Solid (2003), gave them the opportunity to tour Europe with Soulfly. The band disbanded in 2005, but reunited in 2011.

Pop punk scene in Serbia mainly developed in the 1990s, due to the popularity of the bands Oružjem Protivu Otmičara, Six Pack and Čovek Bez Sluha. Oružjem Protivu Otmičara from Zrenjanin are one of the pioneers of the genre in Serbia and their 1996 album BarbieCue became one of the most popular releases of the 1990s. Six Pack and Čovek Bez Sluha, the two bands currently having the same vocalist Milan "Miki" Radojević, the former from Smederevska Palanka, and the latter from Kragujevac, moved from local prominence to performing abroad and having their recordings released by foreign record labels. The popularity of the genre continued in the 2000s (decade) with the work of the above-mentioned bands and the newly formed bands Lude Krawe, formed in 1998, Super s Karamelom, featuring two female vocalists, formed in 2003, and Strip, initially a project by Serbian graphic and comic book artists, which combines graphic art with power pop and pop punk, formed in 2005.

=== Industrial rock (late 1980s–present) ===
Despite being a part of the developed Yugoslav industrial rock scene, Serbian scene gave a small number of notable acts. One of the most notable acts was the band VIVIsect from Novi Sad, which was formed in 1989 and released two cassette albums. Early 1990s brought acts like Overdose from Belgrade and also Katarza from Novi Sad, both whom combined industrial rock with elements of alternative rock and crossover. Another two notable 1990s acts were the bands Retromind from Kruševac and Pure from Jagodina, both combining Ministry-like industrial metal with rock music. The late 1990s brought new industrial rock acts into the scene, such as DreDDup and Žexon 5 from Novi Sad and Klopka za Pionira from Pančevo. DreDDup released seven albums, did several European tours and also collaborated with cult Slovenian industrial group Borghesia. The 2000s brought new bands to the scene: Monolith from Nis, Syphil from Sombor, Figurative Theatre and Pornhouse from Niš.

Several notable acts incorporated industrial rock elements into their sound: grindcore band Urgh!, with their 2001 album Sumo, alternative rock band Dža ili Bu, with their 2007 album Ultra muk, and alternative rock act, Supernaut, drawing on many different musical influences, featured a kind of experimental variant of industrial rock.

=== Grunge and post-grunge (early 1990s–present) ===
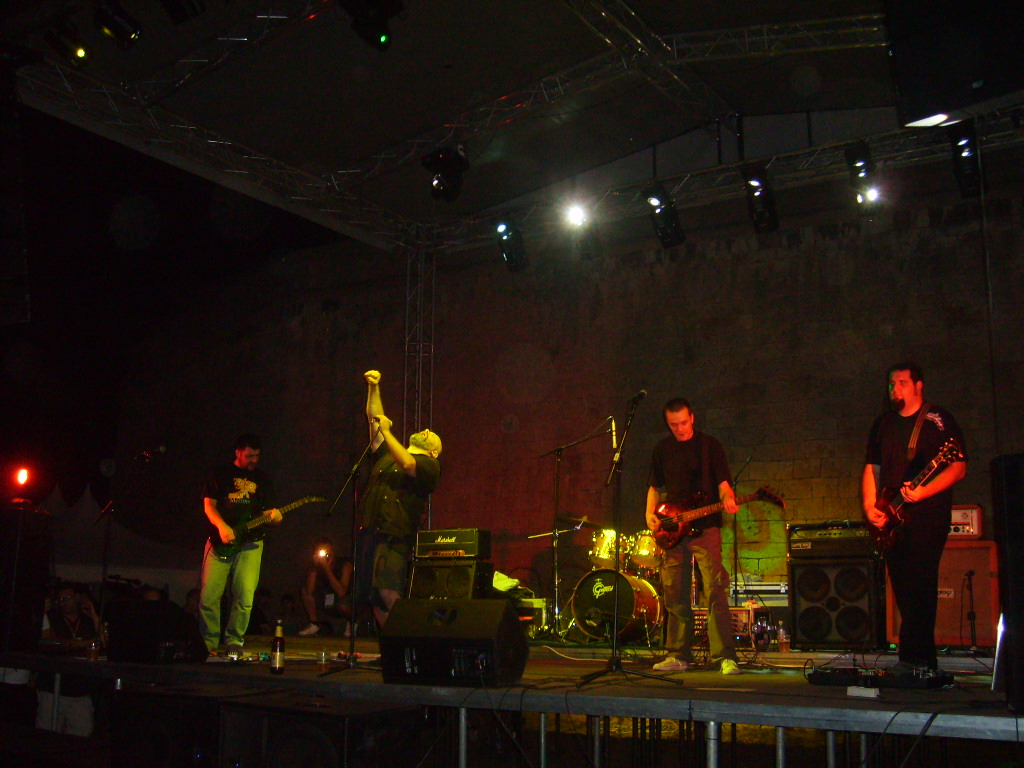
Bjesovi performing in 2009

The bands Block Out from Belgrade and Bjesovi from Gornji Milanovac were the representatives of grunge on the Serbian rock scene. After their debut album Crno, belo i srebrno (1994), the early hard rock concept of Block Out started to move towards a darker, heavier atmosphere and sound under Nikola Vranjković's songwriting. The followup Godina sirotinjske zabave (1996) featured the material written during the six years of the band existence, and the lyrical themes were mainly oriented around the end of socialism in Serbia. With the release of the next album, San koji srećan sanjaš sam (1998), the band moved from grunge sound towards art rock and alternative rock. Bjesovi released their debut U osvit zadnjeg dana in 1991, but achieved success with the release of their second, self-titled album (1994). Achieving success with the album, the band turned towards religiously oriented lyrics and music on their following album Sve što vidim i sve što znam (1997). After the album release, Bjesovi disbanded, after which the band member Goran Marić became one of the originators of the Christian rock project Pesme iznad istoka i zapada (2001). The band reformed with a new lineup in 2000 and released Bolje ti in 2009.

The 2000s featured three notable post-grunge bands, Night Shift, Euforia, and Broken Strings. Night Shift, even though formed in 1991, released their debut album Undercovers in 2002. The album, which featured covers of songs by various rock and pop artists, was well-accepted by the audience and the critics, and the band moved towards writing their own songs, releasing their second album Bez zaklona in 2009. Euforia, formed in 1999 and mainly influenced by Nirvana, released their debut, self-titled album in 2005. The band single "Blokovi" was pronounced the Single of the Year 2005 on the B92 annual singles top list. The band continued performing, and in 2008 released their second album 2. Broken Strings, starting as a Pearl Jam tribute band, moved towards writing their own material. Winning the 39th Gitarijada festival in Zaječar, the band released their debut album Svaki trenutak ostaje... in 2007.

=== Britpop (early 1990s – present) ===
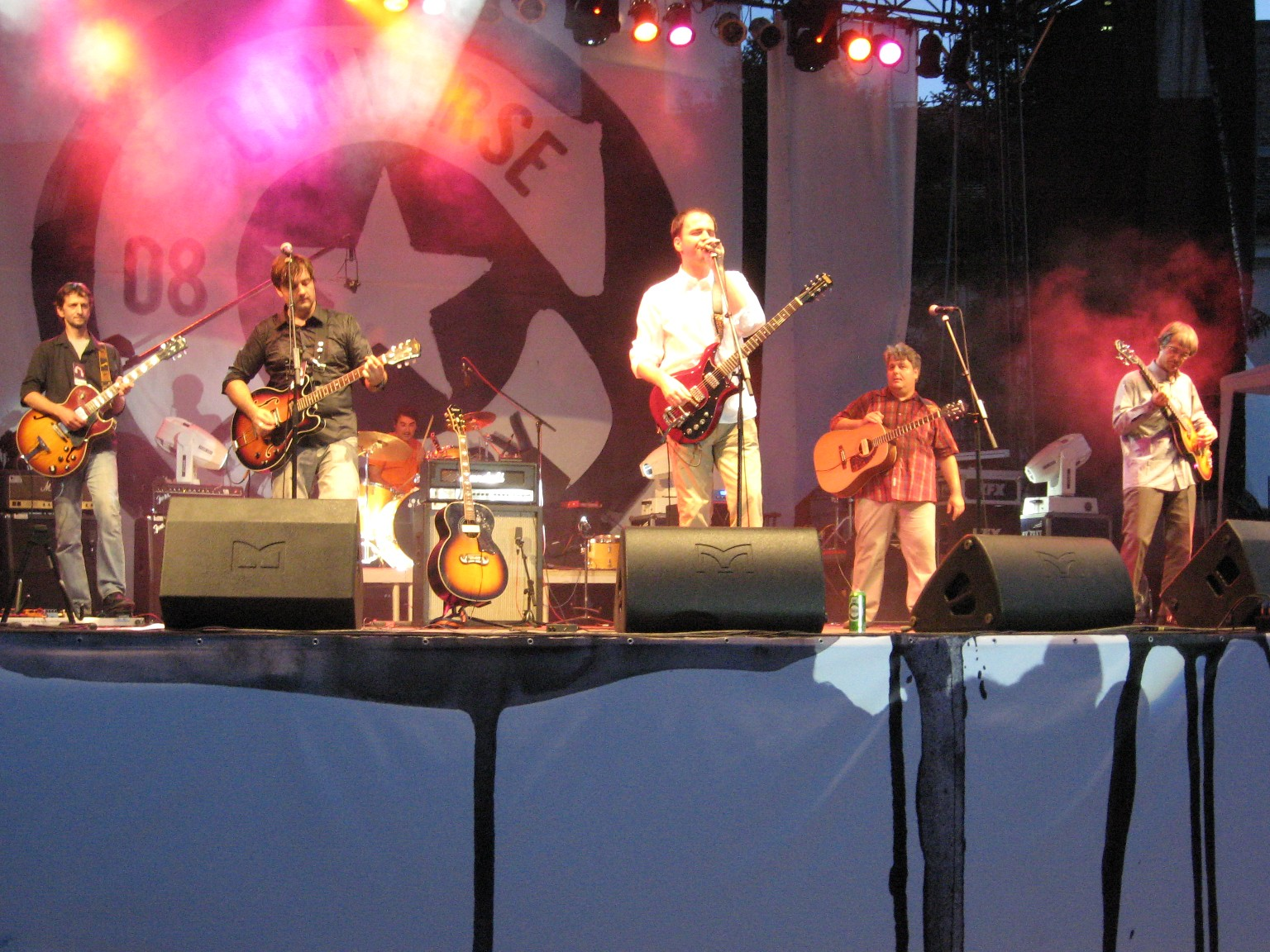
Eva Braun performing in 2008

Britpop appeared in Serbia with the band Eva Braun from Bečej, and the band's faction Popcycle. Eva Braun was formed in 1990 by Goran Vasović, Petar Dolinka and Milan Glavaški. Influenced by The Beatles, Little Richard, The Byrds, and the Serbian band Idoli, the band released their debut album Prisluškivanja in 1992. The album had minor hits, but the single "Sasvim običan dan" found on the band's second album Pop music, released in 1995, had drawn the public's attention to the band's work. The Rolling Stone review of the album described the album as "the best Brit-pop album never to come out of the UK". Despite the success of the release, the internal conflicts lead to the disbandment of the band. Part of the band moved to their newly formed band Popcycle, while Vasović, with a new lineup reformed Eva Braun. The band's third album Heart Core repeated the success of the previous release, and the band, having performed at the International Pop Overthrow, also gained the opportunity to release an album for the North American market with the release of Nowhere Land. In 2000, the band started working on an ambitious project which came out as Everest in 2001, however, after the album release, the band disbanded. Popcycle, formed by former Eva Braun members Petar Dolinka and Milan Glavaški, released their debut album Orbitalna putovanja in 1996, and Popcyclopedia in 1997. The band disbanded in 1999, and Dolinka and Glavaški reunited with the rest of the original Eva Braun lineup in 2007, releasing the album Playback in 2011. In 2006, Glavaški, with a group of Serbian and Hungarian musicians formed his side project, alternative country/pop rock band Rebel Star.

Other notable representatives of the Serbian britpop scene are Kristali, Veliki Prezir, Instant Karma and Lutke.

=== Irish folk and Celtic rock (early 1990s – present) ===
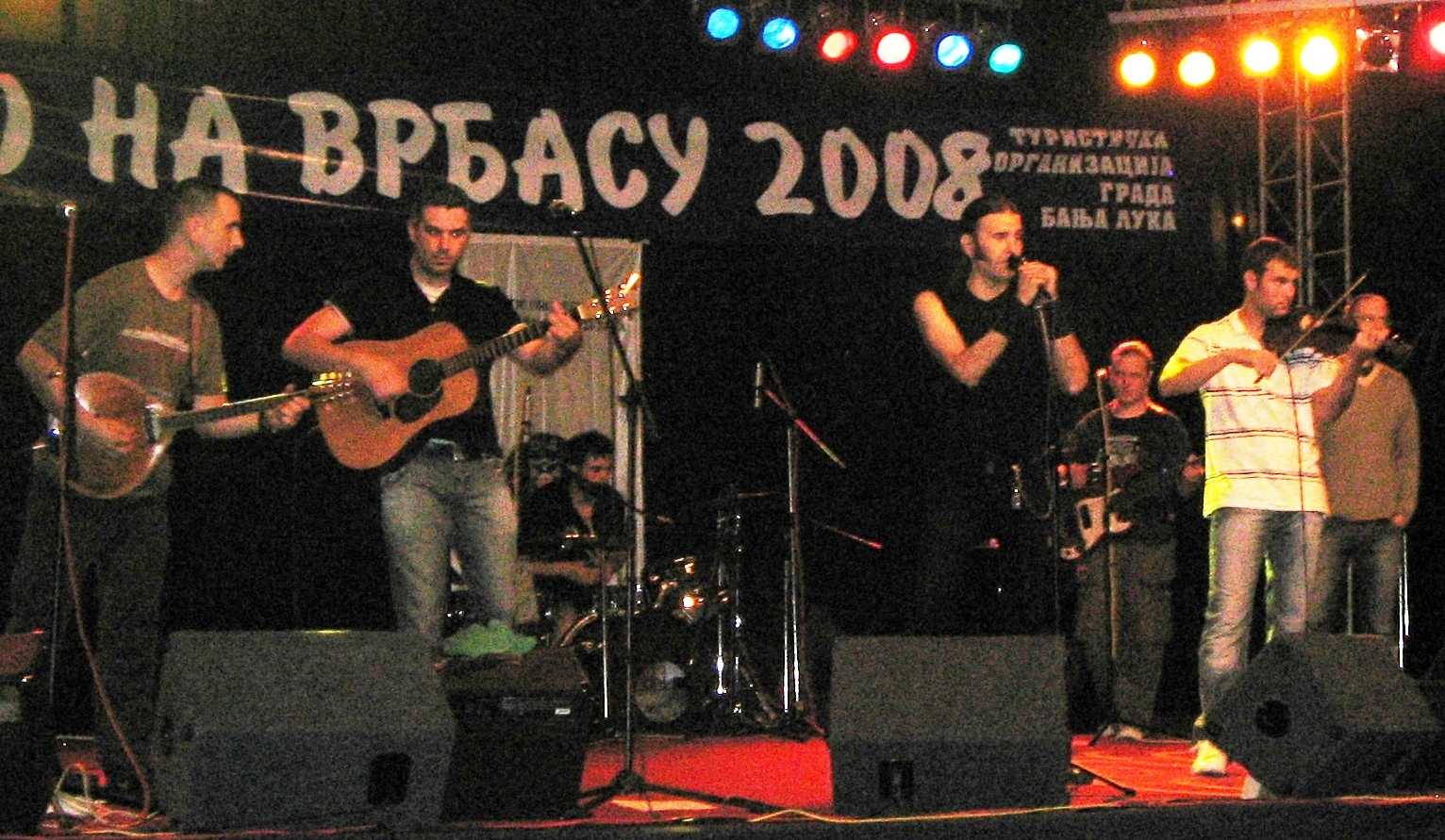
Orthodox Celts performing in 2008

The Irish folk and Celtic rock scene appeared in Serbia with the works of Orthodox Celts from Belgrade. During the mid-1980s, Dušan Živanović, the drummer of the pub rock band Roze Poze, wanted to form a band which would perform cover versions of Irish folk songs, and the influence of the idea was partially achieved through the works of Roze Poze. However, it was in 1992 that Živanović formed the first Serbian Irish folk band called Orthodox Celts with the vocalist Aleksandar "Aca Celtic" Petrović and violinist Ana Đokić. The band, having released their first two albums, Orthodox Celts (1994) and The Celts Strike Again (1997), which mainly featured cover versions of Irish folk songs, started writing their own material. Since the release of Green Roses in 1999, the band centered on writing and recording their own songs. The traditional performances for Saint Patrick's Day and at the Belgrade Beer Fest made the band become a live attraction, having well-visited live appearances in Serbia and abroad.

During the early 2000s, appeared two bands, Tir na n'Og and Irish Stew of Sindidun, both from Belgrade, inspired by the works of Orthodox Celts. Tir na n'Og, formed in 2000, performed a combination of Irish and Serbian folk music with punk rock, and their debut album Tir na n'Og was released in 2006. However, in 2008, the band changed the name to Alfapop and moved towards power pop sound. Irish Stew of Sindidun, formed in 2003, having started as a cover band, started writing their own material. The band recorded their debut album So Many Words... in 2005. In 2011, they released New Tomorrow, their first album not to feature any covers of Irish folk songs.

=== New Serbian Scene (late 2000s – early 2010s) ===
The term Nova srpska scena (New Serbian Scene) was coined in the second half of the 2000s by the web magazine Popboks, which was initially one of the main promoters of the scene. Although the term was mostly used to denote bands promoted in Popboks and released their albums through the record label Odličan Hrčak, the term was also often used to denote many young Serbian bands formed after 2000. Also, some of the bands active in the 1990s, most notably the alternative rock band Goribor, were closely associated to the scene. The bands differed by genre: although a part of the bands were influenced by the Yugoslav new wave and the contemporary indie and pop rock, not all the bands considered part of the scene were. The most notable bands which were associated with the scene include Klopka Za Pionira, Multietnička Atrakcija, The Mothership Orchestra, Nežni Dalibor, Repetitor, Petrol, S.A.R.S., Stuttgart Online, Svi Na Pod!, Zemlja Gruva, ŽeneKese, Virvel, Kralj Čačka and others.

In 2007, PGP-RTS, in cooperation with Popboks, released the compilation album Jutro će promeniti sve?, which featured songs by sixteen bands associated with the scene. By the end of the decade, the most notable representatives of the scene released their debut albums. Goribor, formed in 1996, gained popularity in the 2000s with their demo recordings officially released through the Croatian label Slušaj Najglasnije!, releasing their first studio album, Goribor, in 2007. Petrol, formed in 2003, released their debut album, Nezgodno vreme opasni dani, in 2008. Nežni Dalibor, active in the 1990s and reformed in 2000, released their debut album, Sredstva i veštine, in 2008. Repetitor, formed in 2005, released their debut album, Sve što vidim je prvi put, in 2009. S.A.R.S., which gained nationwide popularity with the hit song "Buđav lebac", released their debut, self-titled album in 2009.

At the turn of the decades, the scene started to dissolve, as the band's started to set off towards their individual careers, with some of them, like S.A.R.S. and Zemlja Gruva, achieving large mainstream popularity and the others remaining popular in alternative rock circles only. In 2013, Popboks announced the end of its activity, publishing its final text on 25 August 2013.

== Bibliography ==
- EX YU ROCK enciklopedija 1960–2006, Janjatović Petar; ISBN 978-86-905317-1-4
- Fatalni ringišpil: hronika beogradskog rokenrola 1959—1979, Žikić Alkesandar, publisher: Geopoetika, Belgrade, Yugoslavia, 1999
- Siniša Škarica, Kada je rock bio mlad: Priča s istočne strane (1956.-1970.), V.B.Z. d.o.o., Zagreb, 2005. godine. ISBN 953-201-517-5
- Punk u Jugoslaviji, Dragan Pavlov and Dejan Šunjka, publisher: IGP Dedalus, Yugoslavia, 1990
- Moj život je novi val, Branko Kostelnik, knjiga intervjua, publisher: Fraktura, Zagreb, Croatia, 2004
- Od Čivija do Goblina: šabačka rock enciklopedija, Ivković Živko, 1999; OCLC 163351502
- NS Rockopedija, novosadska rock scena 1963–2003, Bogomir Mijatović, Publisher: SWITCH, 2005
- Enciklopedija niškog Rock 'n' Rolla 1962 – 2000, Stanojević Vladan; ISBN 86-902517-1-5
- Neka druga scena, Davor Bogdanović; Publisher: GraphIT, 2009
- Riblja čorba, Jakovljević Mirko; ISBN 86-83525-39-2
- Nevidljive terazije Slobodana Stojanovića Kepe, Jakovljević Mirko; ISBN 86-83525-67-8
- Ljuba Ninković: S vremena na vreme, Kajlovic Vladimir; ISBN 86-7784-033-8

== See also ==
- Music of Serbia
- Popular music in the Socialist Federal Republic of Yugoslavia
- New wave music in Yugoslavia
- Punk rock in Yugoslavia
- YU Rock Misija
- Rockovnik
