= Undercovers =

Undercovers may refer to:

- Being undercover, disguising one's own identity
- Undercovers (Trixter album), 1994
- Undercovers (Night Shift album), 2002
- Undercovers (TV series), an American action spy television series created by J. J. Abrams
