= Nežni Dalibor =

Rock music group from Vranje, Serbia

- Origin: Vranje, Serbia
- Genres: Alternative rock, indie rock, post-punk revival, new wave revival, garage rock revival, neo-psychedelia, power pop
- Years active: 1995 – 1998; 2000 – present
- Labels: Odličan Hrčak, Exit Music, PGP RTS, Kultur Akt
- Members: Davor Sopić; Dragan Jovanović; Ivica Marković; Ljubomir Vučković
- Past members: Branimir Bogdanović; Predrag Kocić; Milica Stošić; Miomir Stojković; Dragan Novković; Rodoljub Dinić

Nežni Dalibor (Serbian Cyrillic: Нежни Далибор; trans. Gentle Dalibor) are a Serbian alternative rock band from Vranje and one of the most notable acts of the New Serbian Scene.

== History ==
=== 2000s ===
Formed in Vranje in 1995, and having performed as a high school five-piece band for three years, the band Nežni Dalibor was reformed in 2000 by the original members Ivica Marković (guitar, lead vocals), Ljubomir Vučković (bass guitar, backing vocals) and Branimir Bogdanović (drums), with the new member Miomir Stojković (guitar). At the time, the three were living and studying in Belgrade, thus Nežni Dalibor became a Belgrade-based band. However, after several name changes and live appearances in Vranje and Belgrade, the band went on hiatus in 2003. Two years afterward, in 2005, guitarist Stojković moved to London and the band was reactivated as a trio during the same year.

In January 2007, on the webzine Popboks annual lists, the band had been pronounced the seventh best debut act of the year 2006. During the same year, the band had sent the recordings of their three songs, "Značajan događaj" ("A Significant Event"), "Kratka šetnja" ("A Short Walk") and "Grad još blista" ("The City Still Glares"), to Ivan Lončarević of PGP RTS. One of the songs, "Značajan događaj" appeared on the PGP RTS various artists compilation Jutro će promeniti sve? (Morning Would Change Everything?), featuring the prominent bands of the so-called New Serbian Scene. After the compilation release, the band started performing more often and on March 30, 2007, they appeared as an opening act for Presing on their last concert, held at the Belgrade Dom Omladine. The following month, on April 14, as a part of the Scena Uživo! concert series, with the band The Mothership Orchestra, the band held a sold-out concert at the club of the same venue. In the meantime, the band added a live musician Dragan Novković as the second guitarist and sound engineer.

On January 29, the performance held at the Belgrade club Plastic had been broadcast live by Radio B92 in their show Stand By Live. During the same year, the band had recorded three songs at the Belgrade Technical College studio, "Ne vidim gde si" ("I Cannot See Where You Are"), "Samo magli" ("Only To The Fog") and "Vekovi" ("Centuries"), produced by Boris Mladenović, were released on the Kultur Akt various artists compilation Zdravo, zdravo, zdravo (Hello, Hello, Hello) in 2008. With Mladenović as the producer, from March until July of the same year, the band had been recording the material for their debut studio album at the Digimedia studio. Having the work-title Pokidane niti (Broken Threads), the material featured the songs written during the band's entire career, the previously released songs, "Značajan događaj", written in 1997, "Kratka šetnja", written in 2002, and "Grad još blista", written in 2003.

The debut studio album Sredstva i veštine (Means and Skills), featuring fourteen songs, was released on September 1, 2008, by the independent record label Odličan Hrčak, being the first release of the New Serbian Scene edition, made by the label and the Digimedia studio in order to promote the most popular bands of the webzine Popboks section Scena. The material featured the music entirely written by the band themselves and the song lyrics written by Ivica Marković, except for the tracks "Značajan događaj", written by Branimir Bogdanović, "Kratka šetnja", written by Milan Stojković, "Pokidane niti" and "Grad još blista", written by Miomir Stojković. In the Popboks album review, the critic Dragan Ambrozić in comparing the album with the Eva Braun 1992 debut album Prisluškivanja (Eavesdroppings) stated that "No matter if you believe that Nežni Dalibor has created a kind of a "sped up Prisluškivanja" for the new times or not, it is clear that this kind of elan is here and that it is following such examples of high achievements which happen in unexpected moments, almost unintentionally."

In order to promote the album, the band had also recorded a promotional video for the song "Ti si sam" ("You Are Alone"). The band had also started a live album promotion and during the rest of 2008 and in 2009, they held a tour including the performances in Novi Sad, Sremska Mitrovica, Skopje, Vranje and Belgrade. In the meantime, in January 2009, the song "Ti si sam" appeared on the fifth place at the Radio B92 Pop Mašina best singles of 2008 list, and on the ninth place Studio B Diskomer lists in the same category. The following month, on the Popboks annual critics lists, the "Ti si sam" was selected as the best single and third best music video of the previous year, and the album Sredstva i veštine was voted the second best album of 2008. During the same year, in July, the band performed at the Novi Sad Exit festival, sharing the stage with Elvis Jackson and The Buzzcocks and in September at the Jelen Pivo Live festival, before Eva Braun, Veliki Prezir, The Rakes and Echo and the Bunnymen.

=== 2010s ===
In May 2010, Sredstva i veštine was reissued by the Exit Music online record label in mp3 format available for free digital download In July, the band performed at the Belgrade BELEF festival and in November had two appearances in Croatia. In the meantime, the band had been recording the second studio album at the Digimedia studio. In December, a remix of the song "Samo magli" appeared on the Shpira remix album As I Would Say Two. In January of the following year, Popboks critics selected the fifty best domestic albums released during the previous decade on which Sredstva i veštine appeared on the twelfth and Jutro će promeniti sve? on the sixteenth place.

On March 24, 2011, the second studio album, Normalan život (Ordinary Life), was released by Odičan Hrčak, once again produced by Boris Mladenović. Consisting of eleven songs, the material featured the song lyrics entirely written by Ivica Marković and the music written by all three members and guest appearances by Marija Jovanović (keyboards) and Boris Mladenović (tambourine). In order to promote the release, the band released the single "Jeste li poludeli ljudi?" ("Are You Insane People?") for online streaming via SoundCloud.

In November 2013, the band released their third studio album, entitled simply Nežni Dalibor, featuring the new members Davor Sopić (organ, synthesizer, tambourine) and Dragan Jovanović (drums). The album was produced by Boris Mladenović and self-released.

At the end of 2015, the band released the single "U slojevima" ("In Layers"), announcing their fourth studio album, also entitled U slojevima. The album, recorded in Belgrade and produced by former The Saints member Caspar Wijnberg, was announced to be released during 2016. In March 2016, the band released the second single from the upcoming album, "Vikendi" ("Weekends"), and on May 1, 2016, they released the third single from the album, "Prvomajska" ("Labour Day Song"). In October 2016, the band released the fourth single from the upcoming album, "Godinu dana" ("A Year"). The band announced that U slojevima will be released in February 2017.

== Discography ==
=== Studio albums ===
- Sredstva i veštine (2008)
- Normalan život (2011)
- Nežni Dalibor (2013)
- U slojevima (2017)

=== Other appearances ===
- "Značajan događaj" (Jutro će promeniti sve?; 2007)
- "Ne vidim gde si"/"Samo magli"/"Vekovi" (Zdravo, zdravo, zdravo; 2008)
- "Samo magli (Shpira remix)" (As I Would Say Two; 2010)
