= Night Shift (band) =

Serbian hard rock band

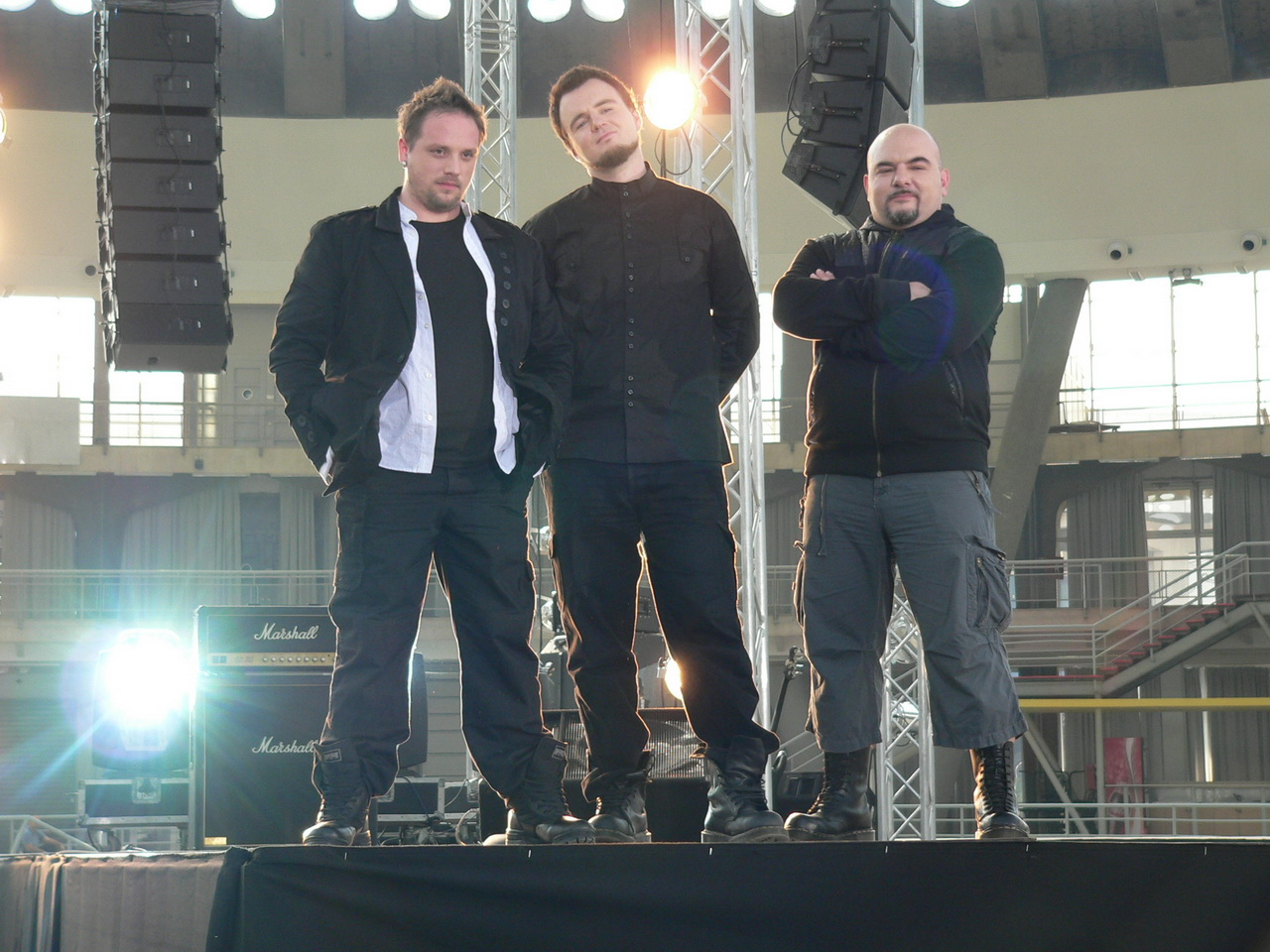
- Night Shift in 2009

Background information
- Origin: Belgrade, Serbia
- Genres: Post-grunge, hard rock
- Years active: 1991 – present
- Labels: PGP-RTS, Multimedia Records
- Members: Milan Šćepanović; Danijel Šćepanović; Branislav Vukobratović
- Past members: Marko Dacić
- Website: www.nightshift.co.rs

Night Shift is a Serbian hard rock band from Belgrade.

== History ==
=== Underground years (1991–2001) ===
The band was formed in 1991, by the Šćepanović brothers, Milan (guitar, vocals) and Danijel (drums, percussion), with their friend Marko Dacić (bass guitar, vocals). The official date of the band formation was chosen to be 11 January 1991, when the trio had their first live performance. Two years later, in 1993, the band started performing across FR Yugoslavia.

During 1999 and 2000, touring extensively, the band introduced a regular sound and light engineer. Already having a cult status, and being a live club attraction, the band started to record a studio album.

=== Mainstream years (2002–present) ===
The band's debut, cover album Undercovers was released in 2002 by PGP-RTS, produced by Milan Šćepanović and Mirko Vukomanović. The album, featuring cover versions of Sade, Eurythmics, The Stranglers, Peter Gabriel, Gloria Jones, Everything but the Girl, The Doors, Ricky Martin, Prince and Terence Trent D'Arby songs, was well received by the critics and audience alike. The album featured guest appearances by Dejan Cukić and Negative frontress Ivana Pavlović on backing vocals. Promotional videos were recorded for the tracks "No Ordinary Love", "Livin' La Vida Loca", and "Missing". During the same year, the band appeared on the tribute album Kao da je bilo nekad... Posvećeno Milanu Mladenoviću dedicated to Milan Mladenović, with the cover version of the Ekatarina Velika song "Ti si sav moj bol" ("You're All of My Pain"). After the release of Undercovers, the band went on the No Ordinary Tour, performing forty live dates, including the Zaječar Gitarijada festival, Novi Sad EXIT festival and Belgrade Beer Fest. By the end of the No Ordinary Tour, the band already had more than 1500 live performances.

In 2004, the band's performance at the Belgrade Studentski kulturni centar was recorded and released on the No Ordinary DVD, the first surround sound DVD release in Serbia. The album and the DVD were also packaged together as a limited edition gift set. During the same year, the band appeared at the annual Beovizija festival, performing the song "Daj mi snage" ("Give Me Strength") with Teodora Bojović. At the festival, the band was nominated for the Band of the Year and Album of the Year 2003 awards, and won both. Also, with the Radio Television of Serbia production, they recorded the promotional film Night Shift – Uncovered, featuring a combination of live and studio performances, interviews and appearances of several music critics, producers and band co-workers.

After the tour, the band started preparing their second album, this time featuring their own material. However, bass guitarist Marko Dacić left the band in 2007, being replaced by Branislav Vukobratović. The new lineup started recording the second studio album, finished during January 2009. The recordings were then sent for mastering and post-production to the Grammy awarded sound engineer James Cruz, who worked on the album at the Zeitgeist Studio in New York City. Bez zaklona (No Cover) was officially released on 13 October 2009, through Multimedia Records. The album featured nine songs, including a rerecorded version of the song "Daj mi snage". As guests on the album appeared Marko Dacić, Teodora Bojović, and the Intermezzo string quartet. Bez zaklona was well received by the press. The band recorded a promotional video for the song "Snovi" ("Dreams") during their performance at the Belgrade Fair – Hall 1. After the album release, the band went on a promotional tour.

On 23 September 2010, the band performed as an opening act on the Guns N' Roses concert at the Belgrade Arena. On November of the same year, the single "Snovi" appeared on the tenth position of the Jelen Top 10 list, and quickly advanced to 4th place. At the beginning of 2011, Bez zaklona was voted No. 9 on the list of Best Domestic Albums in 2010 by the readers of Popboks. In September 2011, the band released two videos, both for the song "Nikada" ("Never"), one featuring Serbian celebrities (including musicians Ana Stanić, Ivana Peters, Marčelo, Prljavi Inspektor Blaža, Aleksandar "Aca Celtic" Petrović, Milan Đurđević, and others), and the other featuring the band's fans.

== Discography ==
=== Studio albums ===
- Undercovers (2002)
- Bez zaklona (2009)

=== Video albums ===
- No Ordinary DVD (2005)

=== Other appearances ===
- "Ti si sav moj bol" (Kao da je bilo nekad ... (Posvećeno Milanu Mladenoviću); 2002)
- "Daj mi snage" (with Teodora Bojović; Beovizija 2004; 2004)
