= Les Chansones Populaires =

Studio album by Električni Orgazam
- Released: August 24, 1983
- Recorded: April 1983 in "Tivoli", Ljubljana, except track B4, recorded November 1982 in "Jadran Film" Studio, Zagreb
- Genre: Blues rock, rock and roll, pop rock, psychedelic rock, progressive rock
- Label: Jugoton
- Producer: Toni Jurij (tracks: A1 to B3); Ljubomir Đukić; Piko; Srđan Gojković

Električni Orgazam chronology
Lišće prekriva Lisabon (1982)	Les Chansones Populaires (1983)	Kako bubanj kaže (1984)

Les Chansones Populaires (French for Popular Songs) is the third studio album by the Serbian/Yugoslavian new wave band Električni Orgazam. It was released in 1983 by Jugoton. The album contains nine covers of popular English language songs.

== Track listing ==
Arranged by Električni Orgazam and Piko.

Side A
No.	Title	Length
1.	"Locomotion" (C. King, G. Goffin)	3:20
2.	"Citadel" (Jagger/Richards)	5:00
3.	"Metal Guru" (Marc Bolan)	2:50
4.	"I'm Waiting for the Man" (Lou Reed)	4:30
5.	"The Man Who Sold the World" (David Bowie)	3:45

Side B
No.	Title	Length
1.	"The Man Who Sold the World (nastavak)" (David Bowie)	1:05
2.	"Being for the Benefit of Mr. Kite" (Lennon–McCartney)	4:50
3.	"When the Music's Over" (The Doors)	10:30
4.	"Blue Moon" (Rodgers, Hart)	3:05

== Personnel ==
- Grof (Jovan Jovanović) — bass guitar
- Piko (Ivan Stančić) — drums
- Ljubomir Jovanović — guitar
- Srđan Gojković — guitar, lead vocals
- Ljubomir Đukić — piano, synthesizer, vocals
