= Bez zaklona =

Studio album by Night Shift
- Released: October 13, 2009
- Genres: Post-grunge; Hard rock Rock
- Length: 35:02
- Labels: Multimedia Records; CD 045
- Producers: Boris Gavrilović; Milan Šćepanović; James Cruz

Night Shift chronology
Undercovers (2002)	Bez zaklona (2009)

Professional ratings
Review scores
Source	Rating
Nocturne	9/10 stars
Serbian-metal.org	(favorable)

Bez zaklona is the second album by the Serbian rock band Night Shift, released in 2009. Unlike the previous album, consisting of cover versions, Bez zaklona consists of the band's own songs. As bonus track on the album appeared the promotional video for the opening track "Snovi".

== Track listing ==
All lyrics by Night Shift, except for track 9, written with Teodora Bojović.

No.	Title	Length
1.	"Snovi" (Dreams)	4:08
2.	"Ranjena" (Wounded)	4:10
3.	"Kad nisi tu" (When You Are Not Here)	4:04
4.	"Nikada" (Never)	3:19
5.	"Svejedno" (Whatever)	4:03
6.	"Ja ću se boriti" (I Will Fight)	2:55
7.	"Znam" (I Know)	4:33
8.	"Ogledalo" (Mirror)	4:46
9.	"Daj mi snage (remix)" (Give Me Strength (remix))	3:04
10.	"Snovi" (Dreams; bonus promotional video)	4:22

== Personnel ==
=== Night Shift ===
- Milan Šćepanović - guitar, vocals, producer
- Danijel Šćepanović - drums
- Branislav Vukobratović - bass

=== Additional personnel ===
- Marko Dacić - bass, vocals
- Teodora Bojović - vocals, backing vocals
- Intermezzo string quartet - string sections
- Mika Knežević - photography
- Boris Gavrilović - producer
- James Cruz - mastered by
