= Trula Koalicija =

Serbian punk rock group

- Origin: Gornji Milanovac, Serbia
- Genres: Punk rock, hardcore punk
- Years active: 1986 – 2002; 2005 – present
- Labels: Češnjak Records, Phantom Tapes, Produkcija Pogledi, Hi-Fi Centar
- Members: Boban Vujić; Saša Vujić; Miloš Topalović; Dule
- Past members: Dragan Cvetanović; Predrag Drčelić
- Website: Official Myspace

Trula Koalicija (Serbian Cyrillic: Трула Коалиција; trans. Rotten Coalition) are a Serbian punk rock supergroup from Kragujevac.

== History ==
The band was formed in 1986 by Predrag Drčelić "Skaki" (vocals) from Gornji Milanovac with KBO! member Saša Vujić "Vuja" (guitar), whom he met at the Faculty of Law where they both had studied, and his brother Slobodan Vujić "Boban" (drums). The band started recording a series of demo recordings at the improvised Češnjak Studio without any idea of later releasing. However, the selected recordings made until 1988 were released on their debut, self-released, album Trula Koalicija. Among the demo recordings were also "Berlinski čovek" ("Berlin Man") and "Prijatelj da budeš" ("Be a Friend"), featured in the 1987 compilation Les Phantoms De Nuit (Phantoms of the Night) released by Phantom Tapes, an underground label run by Predrag Petrović and the song "Bila je nežna kao cvet" ("She Was as Gentle as a Flower") appeared on the Produkcija Pogledi compilation U Jugoslaviji sve je dobro (In Yugoslavia Everything Is Fine).

The album was soon followed by two more albums, Sećanja (Memories), released in 1989, and Ne izlazi iz stroja (Don't Leave the Array), released in 1990, recorded, produced and released in the same manner as the debut. By the time the third album was released, the band had increased its popularity and had well received live appearances. It was at that time that the band decided to add a bass player, Dragan Cvetanović "Ceja", also from KBO!, with whom the band recorded their fourth album Plakao sam kad je pala Sekuritatea (I Cried When the Securitate Had Fallen), recorded at the Male Pčelice Studio on September 17 and 18, 1992. The album featured politically explicit songs "Zašto me mrziš što volim Šešelja" ("Why Do You Hate Me for Loving Šešelj") and "Rodi mi gomilu debila" ("Deliver Me a Bunch of Morons"), and cover versions of Bajaga i Instruktori song "Tišina" ("Silence") but with altered lyrics, entitled "Alkoholičarka" ("Alcoholic Girl") and "Ti" ("You") which featured music taken from a Bad Religion song. The album was well received by the public, selling in about two thousand copies, partially owing to the album cover, designed by Vidan Papić, which featured a combination of the Communist Red Star and the flag of the Nazi Party.

The band released their sixth album Pogled u nebo (A Look at the Sky) in 1994 featuring ten songs, including a cover version of Piloti track "Kao ptica na mom dlanu" ("Like a Bird on My Palm") with altered lyrics, entitled "Kao pile na mom panju" ("Like a Chicken on My Stump"). The following year, the band performed at the ZGAGA festival in Slovenia, however, their appearance ended after about fifteen minutes of performance, due to a motorcycle gang interruption. In the meantime, in 1996, the band released a live album, Live at KST, and in 1998, the band appeared on the live various artists compilation Svi protiv svih (Everybody against Everyone) with three songs, "Vrsta" ("Species"), "Američki san" ("The American Dream") and "Ti" ("You"), released by Hi-Fi Centar. During the same year, the band recorded their sixth studio release, Ubiće nas promaja (Draft Will Kill Us), released through Češnjak Records, the first one to be released on CD, as the other albums were released on compact cassettes only. The band recorded a promotional video for the song "Američki san", which is a cover version of the Bad Religion song "American Jesus". The song also appeared on the Hi-Fi Centar various artists compilation YU rock 2000 in 2000. Two years later, the band disbanded.

In 2005, having been inactive for four years, the band was reformed, with a new bassist, Boneyard member Dule. The band also started working on new material, presenting it with a new single, "Mali mozgovi" ("Little Brains"). In 2009, Drčelić left the band, being replaced by Pakost i Ukor Gladne Godine vocalist Miloš Topalović "Topalko".

At the end of 2014, the band released the single "Dosada" ("Boredom"), announcing the new studio album, expected to be released in 2015.

== Discography ==
=== Studio albums ===
Title	Released
Trula Koalicija	1988
Sećanja	1989
Ne izlazi iz stroja	1990
Plakao sam kad je pala Sekuritatea	1992
Pogled u nebo	1994
Ubiće nas promaja	1998

=== Live albums ===
Title	Released
Live at KST	1996

=== Singles ===
Title	Released
"Berlinski čovek" / "Prijatelj da budes"	1987
"Bila je nežna kao cvet"	1990
"Vrsta" / "Američki san" / "Ti"	1998
"Američki san"	2000

== See also ==
- Punk rock in Yugoslavia
