= Lišće prekriva Lisabon =

Električni Orgazam

Studio album by Električni Orgazam
- Released: 1982
- Recorded: Studio Tivoli, Ljubljana
- Genre: New wave, post-punk, psychedelic rock, gothic rock
- Label: Jugoton
- Producer: Toni Jurij and Električni Orgazam

Električni Orgazam chronology
Električni orgazam (1981)	Električni Orgazam (1982)	Les Chansones Populaires (1983)

Lišće prekriva Lisabon (Leaves Covering Lisbon) is the second studio album by the Serbian/Yugoslavian new wave band Električni Orgazam. It was released in 1982 by Jugoton.

Professional ratings
Review scores
Source	Rating
Rock 82	Mixed

== Track listing ==
=== "A" side ===
1. "Pođimo"
2. "Alabama" (trumpet — Pero Ugrin)
3. "Žuto"
4. "Sam"
5. "Glave"
6. "Devojke"
7. "Afrika"
8. "Podstanar"
9. "Leptir" (trumpet — Pero Ugrin)

=== "B" side ===
1. "Bomba"
2. "Nezgodno"
3. "Razgovori"
4. "Ona"
5. "Znam"
6. "Četvoro"
7. "Odelo"
8. "Dokolica"

== Personnel ==
- Grof (Jovan Jovanović) — bass guitar
- Goran Čavajda — drums, percussion
- Ljubomir Jovanović — guitar
- Srđan Gojković — guitar, vocals
- Ljubomir Đukić — keyboards, vocals
