= James Cruz =

James Cruz is a Grammy Award winning audio mastering engineer and owner of Zeitgeist Sound Studios in Long Island City, New York.

== Biography ==
James Cruz started his career in 2002, at The Hit Factory during its "golden age" under the tutelage of Tom Coyne, Chris Gehringer and Herb Powers Jr. During his time there, he mastered records for artists such as Lil' Kim, Toni Braxton, Mary Mary, Maxwell and Outkast.

After The Hit Factory, James moved to Sony Studios as a senior mastering engineer. There he worked on artists such as Natasha Bedingfield, Calle 13 and Lil Wayne. He also gained an international following with clients from Serbia, England, Australia and Japan.

In 2008, James opened Zeitgeist Sound Studios in Long Island City, New York. It's here that he won his first Latin Grammy for mastering "Los De Atras Vienen Conmigo" by Calle 13.

In 2011, The album "Entren Los Que Quieran" by Calle 13 was mastered by James Cruz and won a record setting 9 Latin Grammys including Album of the year.

== Awards ==
Latin Grammy: Calle 13- Album Of The Year "Entren Los Que Quieran" 2011

Grammy: Calle 13- Best Latin Rock/Alt/Urban Album "Los De Atras Vienen Conmigo" 2009

Grammy: Mary Mary- Best Gospel Song "God In Me" 2009

Latin Grammy: Calle 13- Album Of The Year 2009 "Los De Atras Vienen Conmigo"

Grammy: Mary Mary- Best Contemporary Soul Gospel Album "Thankful" 2000

Latin Grammy: Calle 13- Best Urban Music Album "Residente O Visitante" 2007

== Sources ==
1. http://mixonline.com/recording/mastering/mastering-another-gray-area-1209/index.html
2. http://mixonline.com/mag/audio_hidden_sony_masters/index.html
3. http://www.prosoundnews.com/article/26688
4. http://www.zeitgeistsound.com
5. https://www.allmusic.com/artist/p321268
6. Recording Magazine, April, 2010
