= Undercovers (Night Shift album) =

Studio album by Night Shift
- Released: September 6, 2002
- Genre: Post-grunge; Hard rock Rock
- Length: 36:42
- Label: PGP-RTS; CD 413919, MC 515651
- Producer: Milan Šćepanović; Mirko Vukomanović

Night Shift chronology
Undercovers (2002)	Bez zaklona (2009)

Professional ratings
Review scores
Source	Rating
Rock Express	9.5/10 stars

Undercovers is the debut studio album by the Serbian rock band Night Shift, released by PGP-RTS in 2002.

== Track listing ==
No.	Title	Length
1.	"No Ordinary Love" (Sade cover)	4:36
2.	"Here Comes the Rain Again" (Eurythmics cover)	3:50
3.	"Golden Brown" (The Stranglers cover)	3:02
4.	"Digging in the Dirt" (Peter Gabriel cover)	3:56
5.	"Tainted Love" (Gloria Jones cover)	2:44
6.	"Missing" (Everything but the Girl cover)	4:54
7.	"Break on Through" (The Doors cover)	3:01
8.	"Livin' la Vida Loca" (Ricky Martin cover)	3:33
9.	"When Doves Cry" (Prince cover)	3:32
10.	"Sign Your Name" (Terence Trent D'Arby cover)	3:34

== Personnel ==
=== Night Shift ===
- Milan Šćepanović (guitar, vocals, producer)
- Danijel Šćepanović (drums)
- Marko Dacić (bass, vocals)

=== Additional personnel ===
- Mirko Vukomanović (producer)
- Ivana Pavlović (backing vocals)
- Dejan Cukić (backing vocals)
