= Električni Orgazam discography =

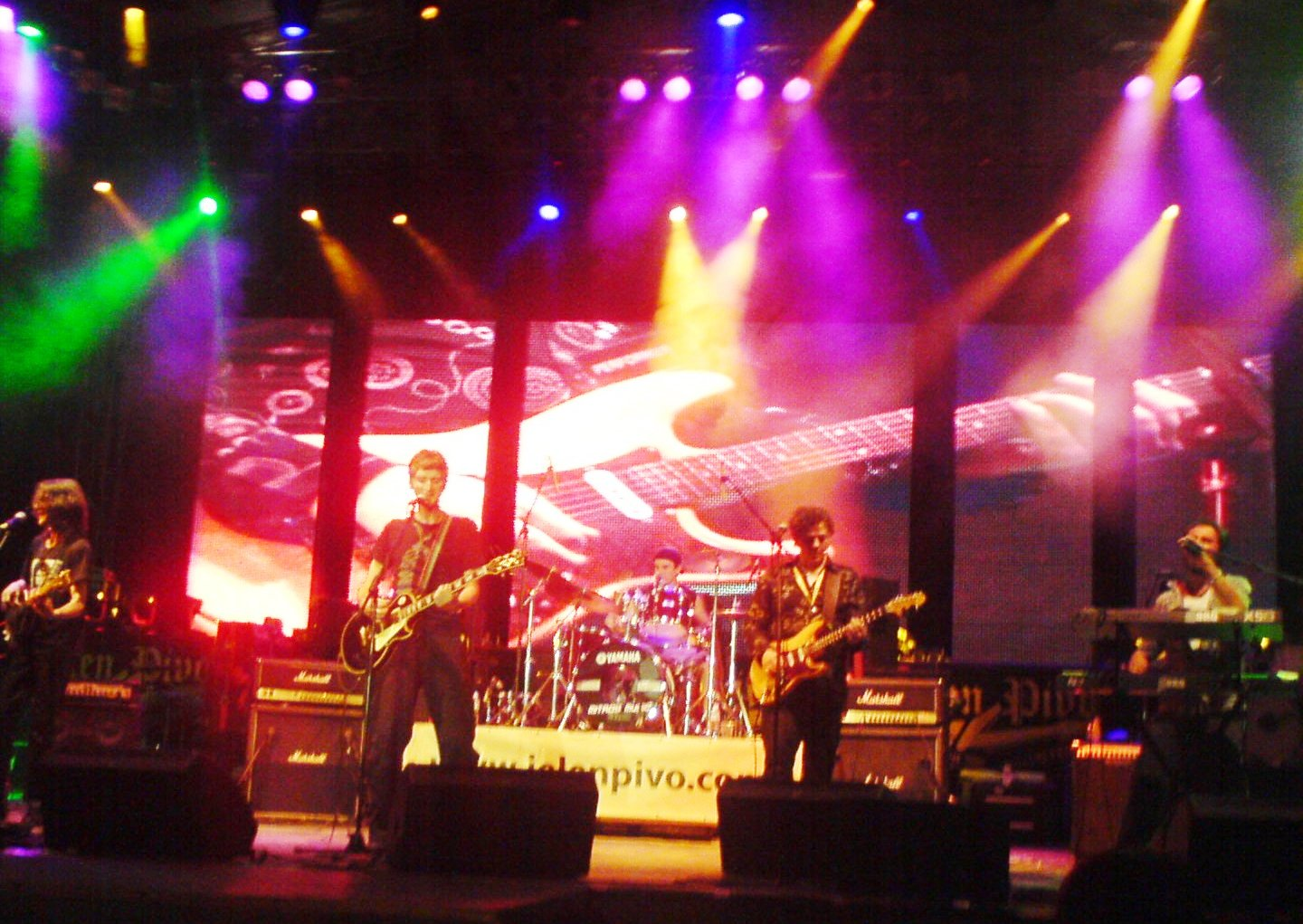
- Električni Orgazam performing at the Jelen Pivo Live festival in 2008
- Studio albums: 10
- Extended plays: 1
- Live albums: 5
- Compilation albums: 5
- Singles: 5

The discography of the Serbian rock band Električni Orgazam (Serbian Cyrillic: Електрични оргазам; trans. Electric Orgasm), consists of ten studio albums, including the cover album Les Chansones Populaires and the upcoming To što vidiš to i jeste, five live albums, five compilation albums, one EP, and five singles.

The band had their first recordings released in 1981, on the Paket aranžman (Package Deal) omnibus showcase album which also featured songs from Idoli and Šarlo Akrobata. The release is today considered one of the most prominent releases of the popular music in the Socialist Federal Republic of Yugoslavia. Throughout the new wave period, the band released the highly successful albums Električni orgazam (Electric Orgasm), released in 1981 and distributed in the rest of Europe via Rough Trade label, managing to get some very good reviews in the British music magazine NME, Lišće prekriva Lisabon (Leaves Fall Over Lisbon), featuring experimental and artistic influences of post-punk and psychedelic rock, and the cover album Les Chansones Populaires (Popular Songs), consisted of covers from David Bowie, The Doors, T. Rex, The Rolling Stones, Velvet Underground and others. The prominent release form the new wave years is also the 1982 live EP Warszawa '81 (Warsaw '81), recorded during the band tour of Poland, considered the first official bootleg recording in former Yugoslavia.

With Kako bubanj kaže (As the Lot Decides), the band experimented with the influences of mainstream oriented rock sound, reaching its peak with the followup Distorzija (Distortion), which is considered to be the band's finest studio effort. 1988, having released their first live album, the band released their last studio album, the pop rock oriented Letim, sanjam, dišem (Flying, Dreaming, Breathing), and the best of compilation Najbolje pesme 1980-1988 (The Best Songs 1980-1988), before the four year discography break. Having returned to the rock scene in the early 1990s, the band released the compilation album Seks, droga, nasilje i strah / Balkan Horror Rock (Sex, Drugs, Violence and Fear / Balkan Horror Rock), featuring new studio material on the A-side and the live material on the B-side of the release. In 1993, the band released the live album Balkan Horror Rock II, and the following year, Zašto da ne! (Why Not!), a double studio album. In 1996, appeared the release of the complete concert recording from the legendary Warszawa '81, and the band unplugged album Živo i akustično (Live and Acoustic).

The studio albums A um bum (A 'oom Boom), released in 1999, and Harmonajzer (Harmonizer), released in 2002, did not repeat the success of the previous releases. They also released two compilations, the best of compilation Najbolje pesme vol. 2 1992-1999 (The Best Songs Vol. 2 1992-1999) in 2002, and Breskve u teškom sirupu vol. 1 (Peaches in Heavy Syrup) in 2006, featuring unreleased material from the new wave era. In 2007 appeared the live album ElOrgNewWave, recorded during the Breskve u teškom sirupu tour, in the Belgrade Dom Omladine. Since 2006, with pauses, the band started preparing the new studio album with the work title To što vidiš to i jeste (What You See Is What You Get), for which the recording sessions were continued in December 2008.

== Studio albums ==
Year	Album details
1981	Električni orgazam: Released: 1981; Label: Jugoton; Format: LP, CS, CD
1982	Lišće prekriva Lisabon: Released: 1982; Label: Jugoton; Format: LP, CS, CD
1983	Les Chansones Populaires: Released: 1983; Label: Jugoton; Format: LP, CS, CD
1984	Kako bubanj kaže: Released: 1984; Label: Jugoton; Format: LP, CS, CD
1986	Distorzija: Released: 1986; Label: Jugoton; Format: LP, CS, CD
1988	Letim, sanjam, dišem: Released: 1988; Label: Jugoton; Format: LP, CS, CD
1994	Zašto da ne!: Released: 1994; Label: PGP RTS; Format: LP, CS, CD
1999	A um bum: Released: 1999; Label: City Records; Format: CS, CD
2002	Harmonajzer: Released: 2002; Label: PGP RTS; Format: CS, CD
2010	To što vidiš to i jeste: Released: September 2010; Label: Dom omladine Beograda; Format: CD
2018	Gde smo sad?: Released: June 2018; Label: Mascom; Format: LP, CD

== Live albums ==
Year	Album details
1987	Braćo i sestre: Released: 1987; Label: Jugoton; Format: LP, CS, CD
1993	Balkan Horror Rock II: Released: 1993; Label: Master Music; Format: CS, CD
1996	Warszawa '81: Released: 1996; Label: Yellow Dog; Format: CS, CD
1996	Živo i akustično: Released: 1996; Label: B92; Format: CS, CD
2007	ElOrgNewWave: Released: 2007; Label: Automatik; Format: CD
2013	Warszawa ’81/Warszawa ’13: Released: 2013; Label: Pomatom EMI; Format: CD
2016	Puštaj muziku!: Released: 2016; Label: Long Play; Format: LP
2023	En vivo en la fabrica: Released: 2023; Label: Croatia Records; Format: CD

== Compilation albums ==
Year	Album details
1981	Paket aranžman: Released: 1981; Label: Jugoton; Format: LP, CS, CD
1988	Najbolje pesme 1980-1988: Released: 1988; Label: Jugoton; Format: LP, CS, CD
1992	Seks, droga, nasilje i strah / Balkan Horror Rock: Released: 1992; Label: PGP RTB; Format: LP, CS, CD
2002	Najbolje pesme vol. 2 1992-1999: Released: 2002; Label: PGP RTS; Format: CS, CD
2007	Breskve u teškom sirupu vol. 1: Released: 2006; Label: Automatik; Format: CD
2009	The Ultimate Collection: Released: 2009; Label: Croatia Records; Format: CD

== Extended plays ==
Year	Album details
1982	Warszawa '81: Released: 1982; Label: Jugoton; Format: EP

== Singles ==
Year	Single details
1981	"Konobar": B-side: "I've Got a Feeling"; From the album: Električni orgazam; Released: 1981; Label: Jugoton; Format: 7"
1982	"Dokolica": B-side: "Dokolica (dub version)"; From the album: Lišće prekriva Lisabon; Released: 1982; Label: Jugoton; Format: 7"
1982	"Odelo": B-side: "Afrika"; From the album: Lišće prekriva Lisabon; Released: 1982; Label: Jugoton; Format: 7"
1983	"Locomotion": B-side: "Metal Guru"; From the album: Les Chansones Populaires; Released: 1983; Label: Jugoton; Format: 7"
1982	"Kako bubanj kaže": B-side: "Tetovirane devojke"; From the album: Kako bubanj kaže; Released: 1984; Label: Jugoton; Format: 7"
