= The Ultimate Collection (Električni Orgazam album) =

Compilation album by Električni Orgazam
- Released: 2009
- Recorded: 1980–2007
- Genre: New wave, punk rock, post-punk, psychedelic rock, rock
- Length: 52:03
- Label: Croatia Records

Električni Orgazam compilations chronology
Breskve u teškom sirupu vol. 1 (2006)	The Ultimate Collection (2009)

Professional ratings
Review scores
Source	Rating
Muzika.hr	4/5 stars

The Ultimate Collection is the sixth compilation album by the Serbian rock band Električni Orgazam, released as a part of the Ultimate Collection series by Croatia records in 2009. This is the first compilation album to feature a selection of the released material spanning the entire band career. The song selection for the album was given to Miloš Ivanović "Kepa", the music editor of the Radio B92.

== Track listing ==
=== CD 1 ===
No.	Title	Length
1.	"Električni orgazam" (Electric orgasm)	4:30
2.	"Krokodili dolaze" (Crocodiles are coming)	3:05
3.	"Vi" (You)	2:30
4.	"Zlatni papagaj" (Golden parrot)	2:03
5.	"Konobar" (The waiter)	2:06
6.	"Odelo" (Suit)	1:57
7.	"Afrika" (Africa)	1:52
8.	"Pođimo" (Let's go)	2:15
9.	"Dokolica" (Idleness)	2:24
10.	"Locomotion" (Little Eva cover)	3:18
11.	"Ja želim promene (Baby, baby, baby, baby)" (I want changes (Baby, baby, baby, baby))	7:03
12.	"Skamenjen" (Stoned)	5:01
13.	"Kapetan Esid" (Captain Acid)	3:45
14.	"Vudu bluz" (Voodoo blues)	2:59
15.	"Ja sam težak kao konj" (I am heavy as a horse)	2:31
16.	"Ne postojim" (I don't exist)	2:20
17.	"Kako bubanj kaže (Live)" (As the drum decides (Live))	4:02
18.	"Bejbe ti nisi tu (Out of Time)" (Baby, you are not here (Out of time) (Rolling Stones cover))	3:34
19.	"Sve ste vi naše devojke" (You are all our girlfriends)	2:51
20.	"Igra rok en rol cela Jugoslavija" (The whole Yugoslavia dances to rock & roll)	4:11
21.	"Zagreb"	1:22

=== CD 2 ===
No.	Title	Length
1.	"Seks, droga, nasilje i strah" (Sex, drugs, violence and fear)	5:13
2.	"Mentalno" (Mentally)	3:40
3.	"Zašto da ne" (Why not)	4:09
4.	"Moj je život paranoja" (My life is paranoia)	2:24
5.	"Spojimo se sad" (Let us join together)	4:49
6.	"Metadonska terapija" (Methadone therapy)	2:54
7.	"Da si tako jaka" (To be so strong)	4:55
8.	"Fras u šupi (Unplugged)" (Shock in the shed (Unplugged))	4:40
9.	"Magična ruka" (Magic hand)	5:35
10.	"Više nisam tvoj (Unplugged)" (No more am I yours (Unplugged))	2:53
11.	"Kakav je to svet?" (What kind of world is that?)	3:44
12.	"Reči lete baš bez veze" (Words fly skimble-skamble)	3:38
13.	"Danas nisam savim svoj" (I'm not my own today)	2:48
14.	"Zato stojim sam" (That is why I stand alone)	4:55
15.	"Hajde bejbe (Daj da vidim sad) (Live 2007)" (Come on baby (Now let me see) (Live 2007))	3:56
16.	"Nebo (Live 2007)" (The sky (Live 2007))	7:51

== Notes ==
=== CD 1 ===
- Tracks 1, 3 and 5 taken from Električni orgazam
- Tracks 2 and 4 taken from Paket aranžman
- Tracks 6, 7, 8 and 9 taken from Lišće prekriva Lisabon
- Tracks 11 and 12 taken from Kako bubanj kaže
- Tracks 13, 14, 15 and 16 taken from Distorzija
- Tracks 17 and 18 taken from Braćo i sestre
- Tracks 19 and 20 taken from Letim, sanjam, dišem
- Track 21 previously unreleased

=== CD 2 ===
- Tracks 1 and 2 taken from Seks, droga, nasilje i strah / Balkan Horor Rock
- Tracks 3, 4, 5, 6 and 7 taken from Zašto da ne!
- Tracks 8, 9 and 10 taken from Živo i akustično
- Tracks 11 and 12 taken from A um bum
- Tracks 13 and 14 taken from Harmonajzer
- Track 15 previously unreleased
- Track 16 taken from ElOrgNewWave
