= Najbolje pesme 1980–1988 =

Compilation album by Električni Orgazam
- Released: 1988
- Recorded: 1980–1988
- Genre: New wave, punk rock, post-punk, psychedelic rock, rock
- Length: 52:03
- Label: Jugoton
- Producer: Ivan Stančić Piko, Srđan Gojković Gile

Električni Orgazam compilations chronology
Paket aranžman (1981)	Najbolje pesme 1980–1988 (1988)	Seks, droga, nasilje i strah / Balkan Horor Rock (1992)

Najbolje pesme 1980–1988 is the first greatest hits compilation by the Serbian rock band Električni Orgazam. The compilation was rereleased in the 1990s by Hi-Fi Centar and Yellow Dog Records.

== Track listing ==
All tracks by S. Gojković, except where noted.

1. "Zlatni papagaj" (2:10)
2. "Krokodili dolaze" (S. Gojković, Lj. Đukić) (3:10)
3. "Konobar" (Đukić) (2:12)
4. "Nebo" (4:38)
5. "Odelo" (2:01)
6. "Dokolica" (2:29)
7. "Locomotion" (C. King, G. Goffin) (3:23)
8. "Skamenjen" (5:14)
9. "Vudu bluz" (2:58)
10. "Debela devojka" (2:41)
11. "Ja sam težak kao konj" (2:36)
12. "Ne postojim" (2:26)
13. "Kapetan Esid" (3:50)
14. "Kako bubanj kaže" (4:17)
15. "Bejbe, ti nisi tu (M. Jagger, K. Richards) (3:47)
16. "Igra rokenrol cela Jugoslavija" (4:11)

== Notes ==
- Tracks 1,2 - from Paket aranžman (1981)
- Tracks 3,4 - from Električni orgazam (1981)
- Tracks 5,6 - from Lišće prekriva Lisabon (1982)
- Track 7 - from Les Chansones Populaires (1983)
- Track 8 - from Kako bubanj kaže (1984)
- Tracks 9–13 - from Distorzija (1986)
- Tracks 14,15 - from Braćo i sestre (1987)
- Track 16 - from Letim, sanjam, dišem (1988)
