= Najbolje pesme vol. 2 1992–1999 =

Compilation album by Električni Orgazam
- Released: 2002
- Recorded: 1992–1999
- Genre: Rock
- Length: 76:25
- Label: PGP RTS
- Producer: Srđan Gojković Gile, Dušan Ercegovac

Električni Orgazam compilations chronology
Seks, droga, nasilje i strah / Balkan Horror Rock (1988)	Najbolje pesme vol. 2 1992–1999 (2002)	Breskve u teškom sirupu vol. 1 (2002)

Najbolje pesme vol. 2 1992–1999 is the second greatest hits compilation by the Serbian rock band Električni Orgazam spanning the releases from 1992 until 1999.

== Tracklisting ==
All tracks by S. Gojković except where noted.

1. "Seks, droga, nasilje i strah" (5:15)
2. "Sad ti je teško" (2:33)
3. "Mentalno" (3:43)
4. "Ša la la" (5:15)
5. "Zašto da ne" (S. Gojković, B. Petrović) (4:12)
6. "Ovaj put je tvoj" (S. Gojković, B. Petrović) (3:02)
7. "Spojimo se sad" (4:52)
8. "Moj život je paranoja" (2:27)
9. "Da si tako jaka" (S. Gojković, B. Petrović) (4:57)
10. "Metadonska terapija" (2:58)
11. "Poljubi me i priznaj mi" (3:56)
12. "Sve ste vi naše devojke" (3:43)
13. "Sunce zna da mesec zna" (2:55)
14. "Ti" (4:43)
15. "Ona uvek želi sve" (4:22)
16. "I nikog nema da nas probudi" (3:03)
17. "Gde da nađem sada ja sebi takvu devojku?" (2:27)
18. "Reči lete baš bez veze" (3:41)
19. "Kakav je to svet?" (3:46)
20. "Više nikad kao nekad" (4:42)

== Notes ==
- Tracks 1 to 5 - from Seks, droga, nasilje i strah / Balkan Horror Rock (1992)
- Tracks 6 to 10 - from Zašto da ne! (1994)
- Tracks 11 to 15 - from Živo i akustično (1996)
- Tracks 16 to 20 - from A um bum (1999)
