= Balkan Horor Rok II =

Live album by Električni Orgazam
- Released: 1993
- Recorded: 1992; Studio M, Novi Sad
- Genre: Punk rock Alternative rock Rock
- Length: 34:36
- Label: Master Music
- Producer: Srđan Gojković Gile

Električni Orgazam live chronology
Seks, droga, nasilje i strah / Balkan Horor Rock (1992)	Balkan Horor Rok II (1993)	Warszawa '81 (1996)

Balkan Horor Rok II is a live album by the Serbian rock band Električni Orgazam. The album, released on cassette only, is the second part of the live recordings released as a part of the compilation Seks, droga, nasilje i strah / Balkan Horor Rock.

== Track listing ==
1. "Bomba" / "Nezgodno" – 4:38
2. "Devojke" – 1:37
3. "Odelo" – 2:31
4. "Pojmove ne povezujem" – 2:47
5. "Dokolica" – 2:24
6. "Hajde bejbe (daj da vidim sad)" – 3:26
7. "Svecane bele kosulje" – 4:59
8. "Mjau mjau" – 3:34
9. "Kapetan Esid" – 4:11
10. "Lui Lui" – 4:29

== Personnel ==
- Srđan Gojković Gile – guitar, vocals
- Branislav Petrović Banana – guitar, vocals
- Goran Čavajda Čavke – drums
- Zoran Radomirović Švaba – bass
