= 1991–1992 anti-war protests in Belgrade =

Anti-war protests in Belgrade
- Part of the Yugoslav Wars
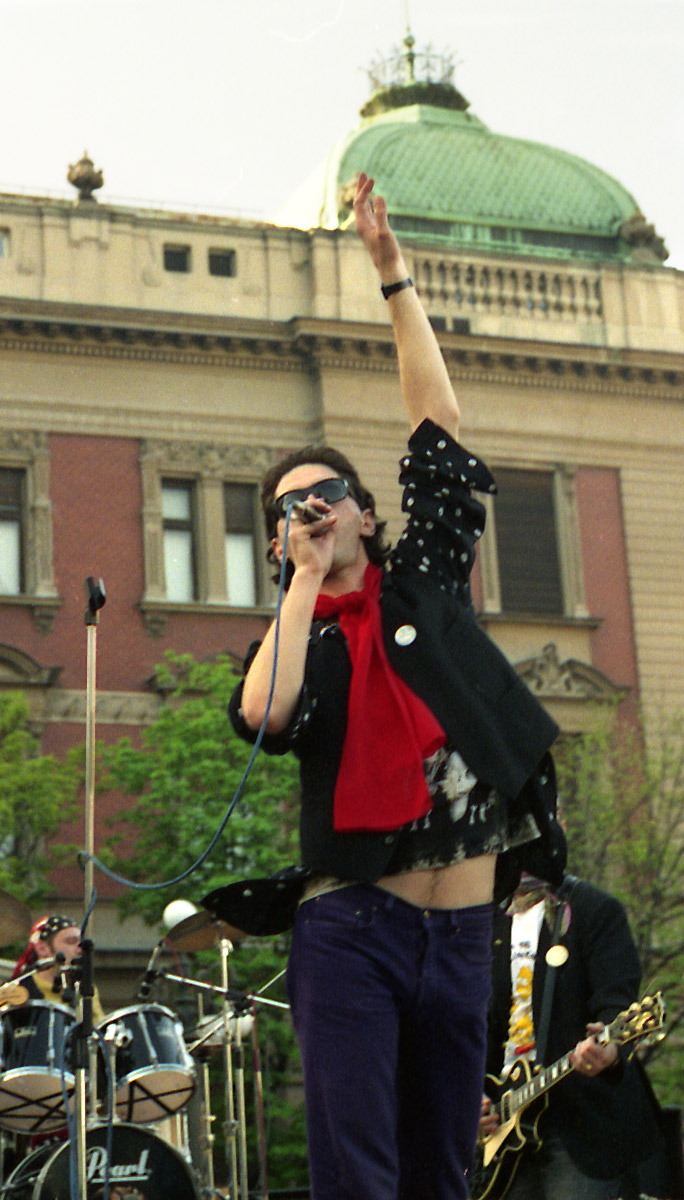
- Srđan Gojković from Električni Orgazam performing as part of Rimtutituki
- Date: 1991 – 1992
- Location: Belgrade, Serbia, Yugoslavia
- Caused by: Serbian role in Yugoslav Wars: Battle of Vukovar; Siege of Dubrovnik; Siege of Sarajevo; War propaganda
- Goals: Withdrawal of the Yugoslav People's Army troops; Referendum on a declaration of war; Disruption of military conscription; Resignation of Slobodan Milošević; Freedom of the media
- Methods: Demonstrations, Protests, Protest songs
- Result: 50,000–200,000 deserters 100,000–150,000 conscripts emigrated

Parties
Center for Antiwar Action; Rimtutituki; Women in Black; Humanitarian Law Center; Belgrade Circle	(Serbia and Montenegro) Government of Yugoslavia; Government of Serbia

Lead figures
Milan Mladenović; Rambo Amadeus; Zoran Kostić; Bogdan Bogdanović; Nataša Kandić	(Serbia) Slobodan Milošević (Serbia and Montenegro) Dobrica Ćosić

Number
>150,000 protesters	

Following the rise of nationalism and political tensions, as well as the outbreak of the Yugoslav Wars, numerous anti-war movements developed in Serbia. The 1991 mass protests against the government of Slobodan Milošević which continued throughout the conflicts reinforced the youth's anti-war orientation. Demonstrations in Belgrade were held mostly because of opposition to the Battle of Vukovar, Siege of Dubrovnik and Siege of Sarajevo, while protesters demanded a referendum on a declaration of war and disruption of military conscription.

More than 50,000 people participated in many protests, and more than 150,000 people took part in the most massive protest called “The Black Ribbon March” in solidarity with people in Sarajevo. It is estimated that between 50,000 and 200,000 people deserted from the Yugoslav People's Army, while between 100,000 and 150,000 people emigrated from Serbia refusing to participate in the war.

According to professor Renaud De la Brosse, senior lecturer at the University of Reims and a witness called by the International Criminal Tribunal for the former Yugoslavia (ICTY), it is surprising how great the resistance to Milošević's propaganda was among Serbs, given that and the lack of access to alternative news. A month after the Battle of Vukovar, opinion polls found that 64% of Serbian people wanted to end the war immediately and only 27% were willing for it to continue. Political scientists Orli Fridman described that not enough attention was given to anti-war activism among scholars studying the breakup of Yugoslavia and the wars, as well as that independent media and anti-war groups from Serbia did not attract the international attention.

== The main participants ==
The most famous associations and NGOs who marked the anti-war ideas and movements in Serbia were the Center for Antiwar Action, Women in Black, Humanitarian Law Center and Belgrade Circle. The Rimtutituki was a rock supergroup featuring Ekatarina Velika, Električni Orgazam and Partibrejkers members, which was formed at the petition signing against mobilization in Belgrade. The band organized a concert on the Republic Square and also they performed anti-war songs in an open truck while circulating the Belgrade streets.

The most prominent politician who supported protests was Ivan Stambolić. The Democratic Party, People's Peasant Party, Serbian Liberal Party and Reform Party of Serbia took part in the “Black Ribbon March”.

The famous architect Bogdan Bogdanović was one of the most prominent anti-war dissident. The Belgrade citizens who protested against the Siege of Dubrovnik were joined by prominent artists, composers and actors such as Mirjana Karanović and Rade Šerbedžija, who sang jointly “Neću protiv druga svog” (“I can’t go against my friend”).

Independent media in Serbia reported on anti-war activities with much difficulty, in contrast to Milošević's propaganda, which was aimed at reviving ethnonational sentiments and mobilizing people. An important role in media coverage was played by the Western-funded electronic media B92 and Studio B.

One of the more famous scenes during the anti-war protests was a tank parked in front of the Parliament Building, which was returned from the battlefield in Vukovar by soldier Vladimir Živković.

== See also ==
- 1992 anti-war protests in Sarajevo
- Concert Yutel for Peace
