= Rimtutituki =

Background information
- Also known as: Rimtuti Tuki
- Origin: Belgrade, Serbia
- Genres: Punk rock, rock
- Years active: 1992–1993
- Labels: PGP-RTB, B92
- Past members: Borko Petrović; Goran Čavajda; Ljubomir Jovanović; Milan Mladenović; Nebojša Antonijević; Srđan Gojković; Zoran Kostić; Zoran Radomirović

Rimtutituki (Serbian Cyrillic: Римтутитуки; anagram for Turim ti kitu, trans. I put my dick in you) was a Serbian rock supergroup featuring Ekatarina Velika, Električni Orgazam and Partibrejkers members. The band was formed as an anti-war project during the Yugoslav Wars and 1991–1992 anti-war protests in Belgrade.

The group consisted of Zoran Kostić "Cane" (vocals), Nebojša Antonijević "Anton" (guitar), Borko Petrović (drums), Srđan Gojković "Gile" (guitar, vocals), Goran Čavajda "Čavke" (drums), Zoran Radomirović "Švaba" (bass), Ljubomir Jovanović "Jovec" (guitar) and Milan Mladenović (guitar, vocals).

== History ==
A rare Rimtutituki promotional photo

The band was formed at the petition signing against mobilization in Belgrade. On the meeting appeared Ekatarina Velika, Električni Orgazam and Partibrejkers members. Čavajda and Kostić suggested forming an anti-war band which was approved by the others.

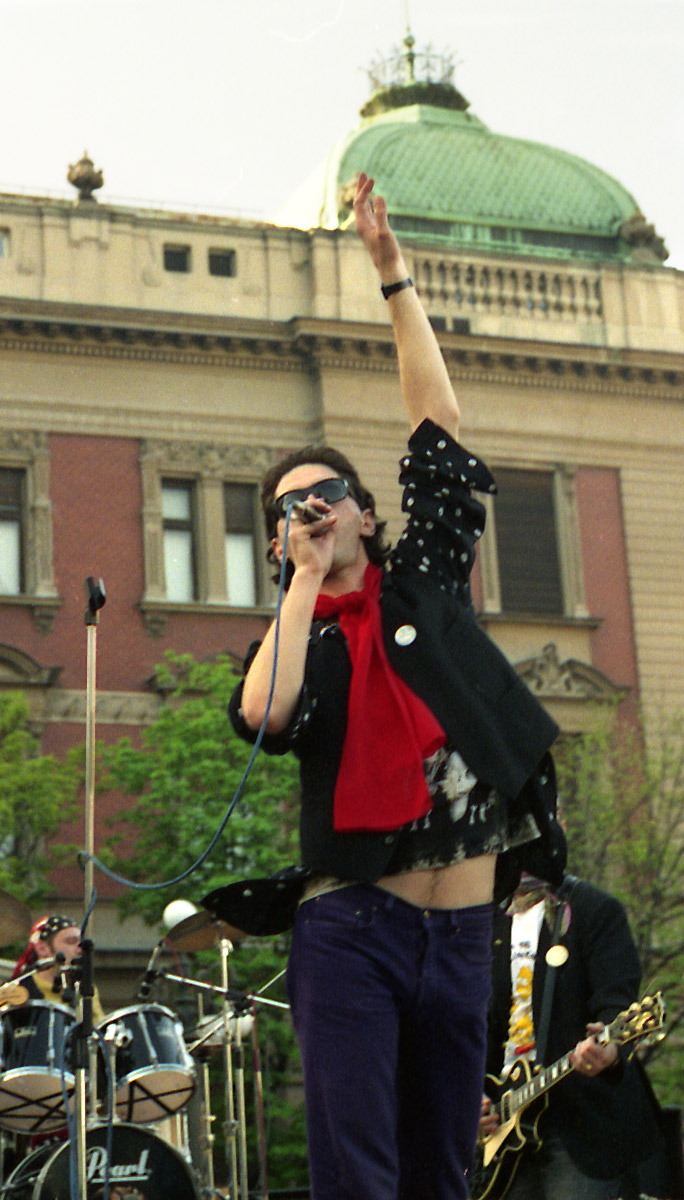
Srđan Gojković performing with Rimtutituki

At a rehearsal, held without Mladenović, Gojković and Antonijević started working on the music and Kostić, with the help of the other members, on the lyrics which resulted the "Slušaj 'vamo" ("Listen Here") song. Mladenović later added slide guitar and backing vocals. Even though the band had planned to record a long play album, only the single "Slušaj 'vamo" was released, featuring two versions of the track. The songs were recorded for free in the Pink Studio and were released by radio B92 with the PGP-RTS label. A promotional video was recorded for the song which also appeared on the B92 1994 Radio utopia (1989–1994) various artists compilation.

The promotion of the single was held on March 2, 1992, at the Cinema museum in Belgrade and the campaign was planned as the media project featuring the "Slušaj 'vamo" single, badges and T-shirts given as a present. The band did not get permission from the authorities to perform live, so they used a truck trailer, driven through the streets of Belgrade, as the stage. For the second performance, the band performed at the Republic Square in Belgrade, this time approved by the authorities. The band presented the anti-war message "S.O.S mir ili ne računajte na nas" ("S.O.S. Peace or Do not Count on Us"). After the concert, the supergroup members split up and continued working with their own bands.

The following year, on September, the band, with Ekatarina Velika, Partibrejkers, and the Zagreb band Vještice, performed in Prague and Berlin on the concerts entitled Ko to tamo pjeva (Who's That Singing Over There). The band performed several tracks, intended to be the released on the band album, however, since both Ekatarina Velika and Partibrejkers were recording their own albums, the songs were never recorded. One of the tracks, "Keine Macht Den Drogen", appeared on the Električni Orgazam album Zašto da ne!. After the performance, the band disbanded.

== Legacy ==
In 2000, "Slušaj 'vamo" was polled No.27 on Rock Express Top 100 Yugoslav Rock Songs of All Times list.

On April 4, 2010, the organization Youth Initiative for Human Rights organized a concert, at the plateau in front of the University of Belgrade Faculty of Philosophy, in order to celebrate the 18th anniversary of the Rimtutituki project. On the occasion, the bands Repetitor, Multietnička Atrakcija, Lira Vega, Stuttgart Online and Superkvartet appeared as performers. Superkvartet appeared as a one-off group, consisting of Zoran Radomirović "Švaba" (guitar; Rimtutituki, Električni Orgazam), Aleksandar Grujić "Alex" (keyboards; Lellbach), Miroslav Mišković "Jozzef" (electronics; Jozzef and the Children) and Goran Smiljanić "Smilja" (vocals), who performed a remake of the song "Slušaj 'vamo".

== Discography ==
=== Singles ===
- "Slušaj 'vamo" / "Slušaj 'vamo (voljno mix)" (1992)

=== Various artists compilations ===
- Radio utopia (1989–1994) (1994)
