= ElOrgNewWave =

Live album by Električni Orgazam

Live album by Električni Orgazam
- Released: June 28, 2007
- Recorded: February 9, 2007; Dom Omladine, Belgrade
- Genre: New wave revival, psychedelic rock, rock
- Length: 67:25
- Label: Automatik Records

Električni Orgazam live chronology
Živo i akustično (1996)	ElOrgNewWave (2007)

Professional ratings
Review scores
Source	Rating
Popboks	8/10 stars
David SUBROCK	2.5/5 stars

ElOrgNewWave is the fifth live album by the Serbian rock band Električni Orgazam. The album featured the live versions of the song from the band's new wave period.

== Track listing ==
1. "Električni orgazam" (5:05)
2. "Vi" (2:46)
3. "Pođimo" (2:41)
4. "Afrika" (4:44)
5. "Pojmove ne povezujem" (3:20)
6. "Umetnost" (2:05)
7. "Fleke" (4:22)
8. "Infekcija" (4:01)
9. "Dokolica" (2:43)
10. "I've Got a Feeling" (3:25)
11. "Znam" (3:30)
12. "Leptir" (8:21)
13. "Krokodili dolaze" (6:16)
14. "Nebo" (7:57)
15. "Konobar" (2:48)
16. "Zlatni papagaj" (3:21)

== Personnel ==
- Srđan Gojković Gile (guitar, vocals)
- Branislav Petrović Banana (guitar, vocals)
- Ljubomir Đukić Ljuba (keyboards, vocals)
- Zoran Radomirović Švaba (bass, vocals)
- Blagoje Nedeljković Pače (drums)

=== Additional personnel ===
- Ljubomir Jovanović Jovec (guitar on tracks 14, 15 and 16)
