= Anti-war movement =

Social movement opposed to armed conflicts

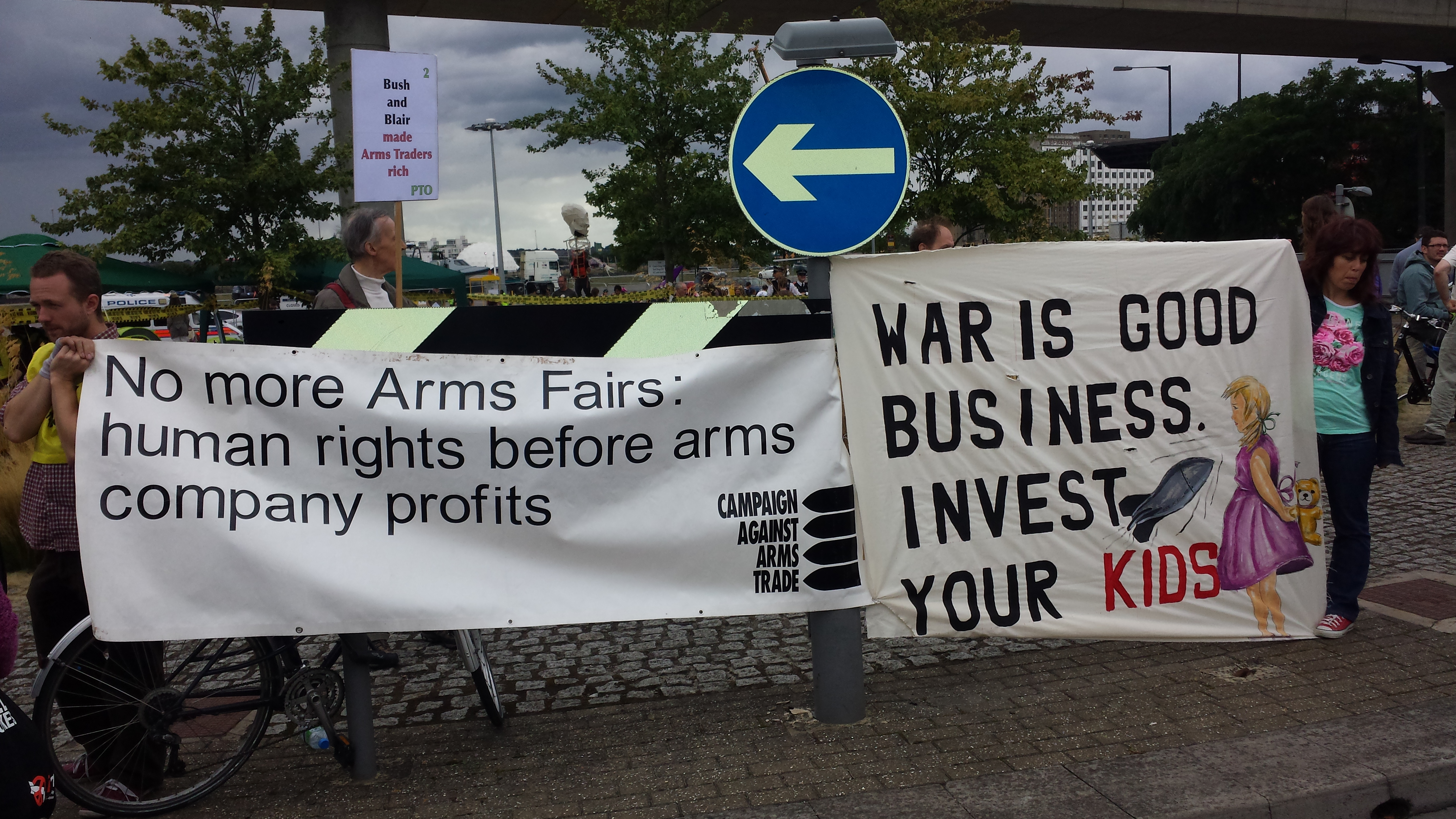
Protest against the arms trade at a London arms fair

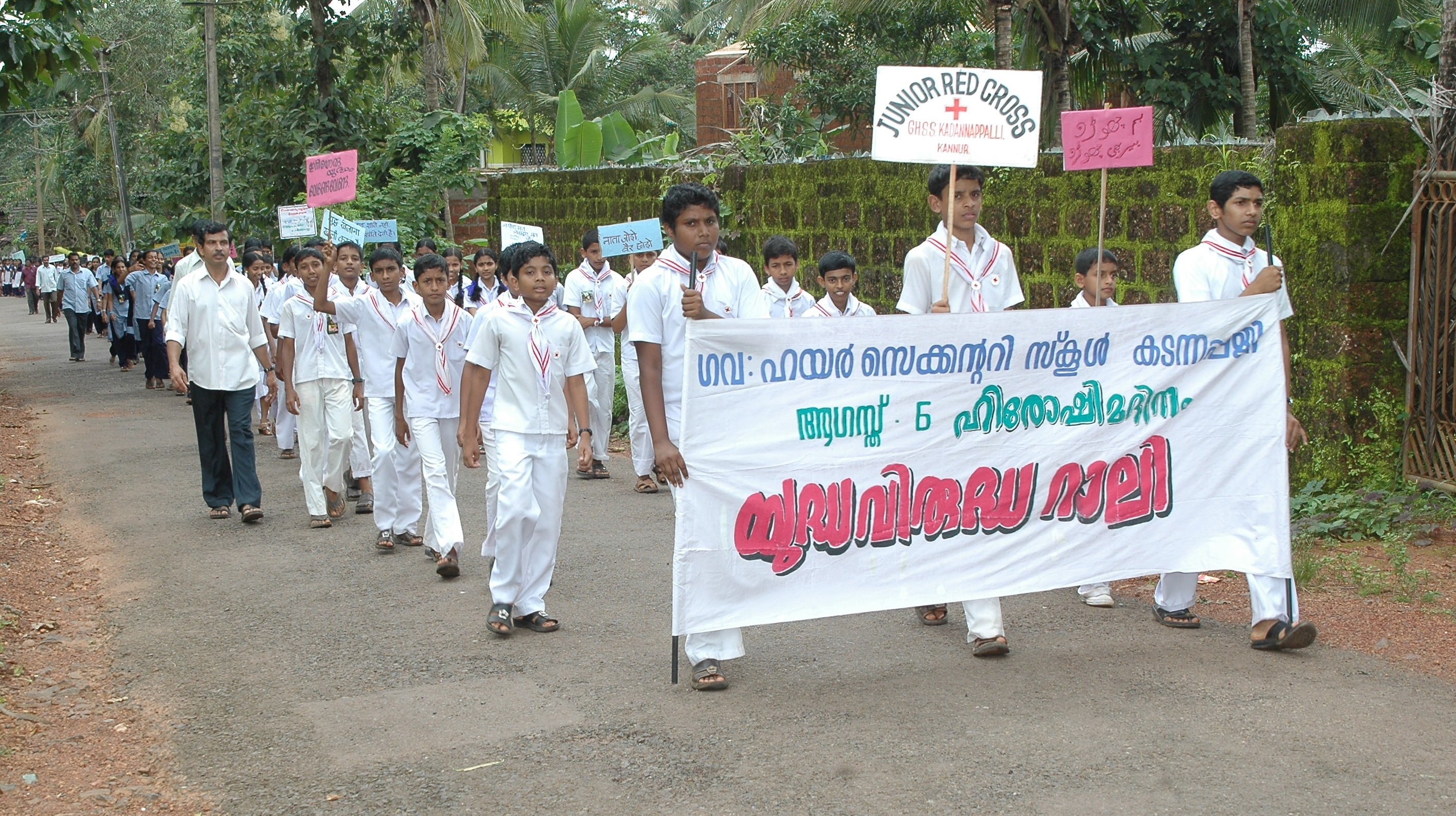
Anti-war rally of schoolchildren in Pilathara, India

An anti-war movement is a social movement in opposition to one or more nations' decision to start or carry on an armed conflict. The term anti-war can also refer to pacifism, which is the opposition to all use of military force during conflicts, or to anti-war books, paintings, and other works of art. Some activists distinguish between anti-war movements and peace movements. Anti-war activists work through protest and other grassroots means to attempt to pressure a government (or governments) to put an end to a particular war or conflict or to prevent one from arising.

== History ==
=== Antebellum United States ===
Substantial antiwar sentiment developed in the United States roughly between the end of the War of 1812 and the commencement of the Civil War in what is called the Antebellum era. A similar movement developed in England during the same period. The movement reflected both strict pacifist and more moderate non-interventionist positions. Many prominent intellectuals of the time, including Ralph Waldo Emerson, Henry David Thoreau (see Civil Disobedience) and William Ellery Channing contributed literary works against war. Other names associated with the movement include William Ladd, Noah Worcester, Thomas Cogswell Upham, and Asa Mahan. Many peace societies were formed throughout the United States, the most prominent of which being the American Peace Society. Numerous periodicals (such as The Advocate of Peace) and books were also produced.

A recurring theme in this movement was the call for the establishment of an international court to adjudicate disputes between nations. Another distinct feature of antebellum antiwar literature was the emphasis on how war contributed to a moral decline and brutalization of society in general.

=== American Civil War ===
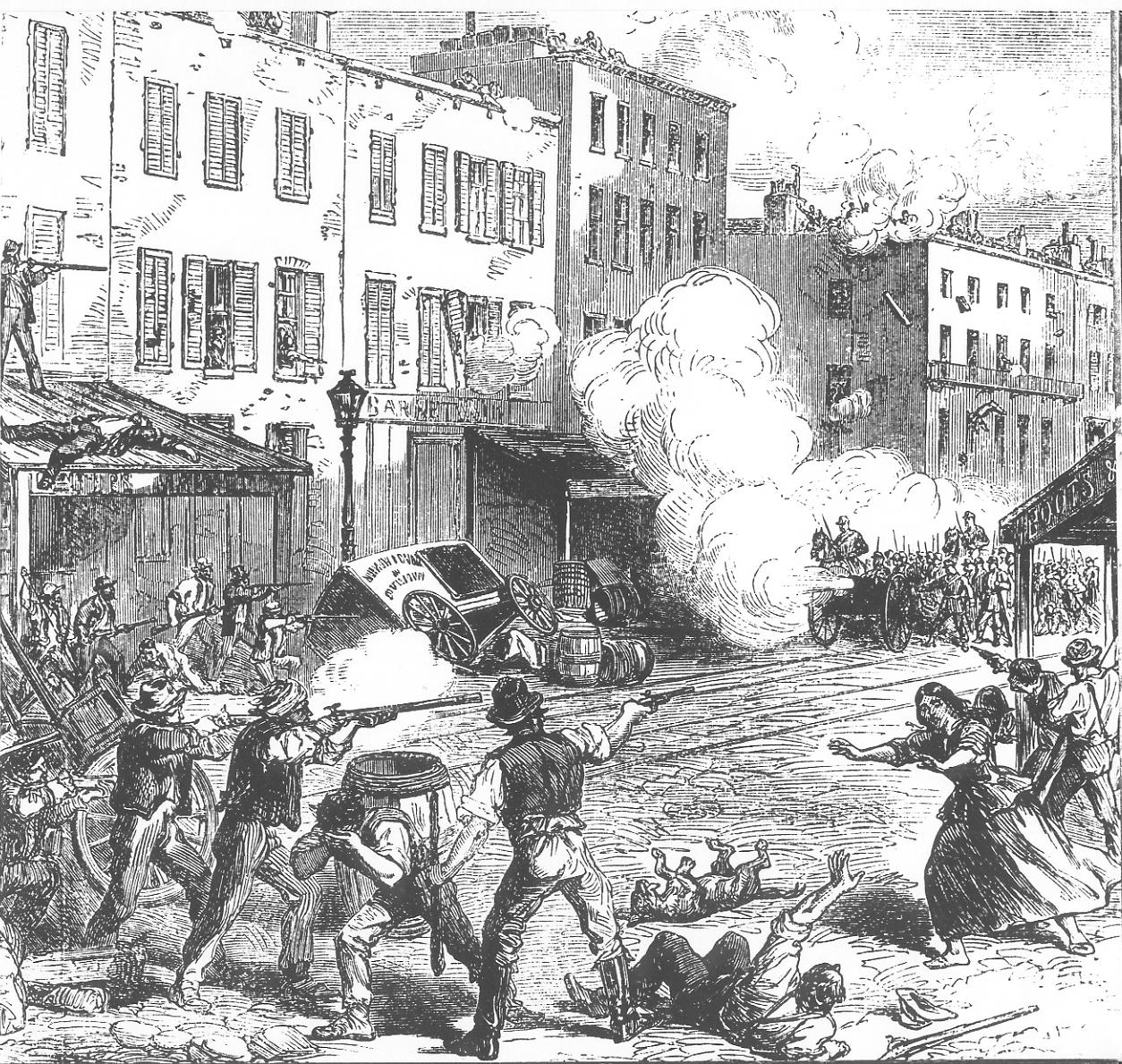
Rioters attack federal troops.

A key event in the early history of the modern anti-war stance in literature and society was the American Civil War, where it culminated in the candidacy of George B. McClellan for US president as a Peace Democrat against incumbent President Abraham Lincoln. The outlines of the antiwar stance are seen: the argument of the costs of maintaining the present conflict not being worth the gains that can be made, the appeal to end the horrors of war, and the argument of war being waged for the profit of particular interests.

During the war, the New York Draft Riots were started as violent protests against Lincoln's Enrollment Act of Conscription to draft men to fight in the war. The outrage over conscription was augmented by the ability to "buy" one's way out, which could be afforded only by the wealthy.

After the war, The Red Badge of Courage described the chaos and sense of death which resulted from the changing style of combat: away from the set engagement, and towards two armies engaging in continuous battle over a wide area.

=== Second Boer War ===
William Thomas Stead formed an organization against the Second Boer War, the Stop the War Committee.

=== World War I ===
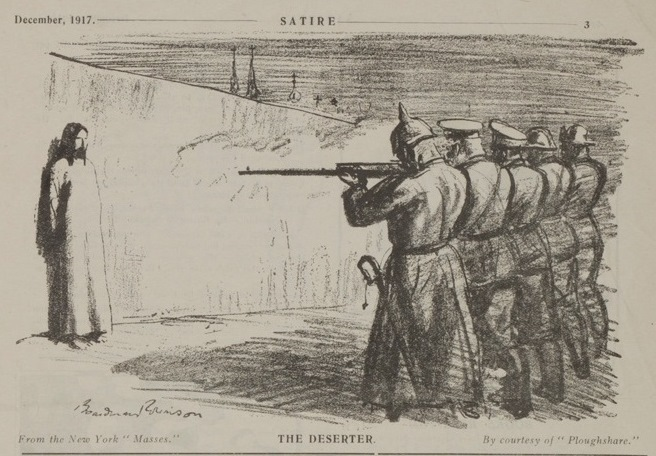
The Deserter by Boardman Robinson, The Masses, 1916

In Britain, in 1914, the Public Schools Officers' Training Corps annual camp was held at Tidworth Camp, near Salisbury Plain. Head of the British Army Lord Kitchener was to review the cadets, but the imminence of the war prevented him. General Horace Smith-Dorrien was sent instead. He surprised the two-or-three thousand cadets by declaring (in the words of Donald Christopher Smith, a Bermudian cadet who was present) "that war should be avoided at almost any cost, that war would solve nothing, that the whole of Europe and more besides would be reduced to ruin, and that the loss of life would be so large that whole populations would be decimated. In our ignorance I, and many of us, felt almost ashamed of a British General who uttered such depressing and unpatriotic sentiments, but during the next four years, those of us who survived the holocaust-probably not more than one-quarter of us – learned how right the General's prognosis was and how courageous he had been to utter it." Having voiced these sentiments did not hinder Smith-Dorrien's career, or prevent him from carrying out his duty in the First World War to the best of his abilities.

With the increasing mechanization of war, opposition to its horrors grew, particularly in the wake of the First World War. European avant-garde cultural movements such as Dada were explicitly anti-war.

The Espionage Act of 1917 and the Sedition Act of 1918 gave the American authorities the right to close newspapers and jail individuals for having anti-war views.

On 16 June 1918, American socialist Eugene V. Debs made an anti-war speech and was arrested under the Espionage Act of 1917. He was convicted, sentenced to serve ten years in prison, but President Warren G. Harding commuted his sentence on 25 December 1921.

=== Between the World Wars ===
Many WWI veterans, including US General Smedley Butler, spoke out against wars and war profiteering on their return to civilian life.

In 1924, Ernst Friedrich published Krieg dem Krieg! (War Against War!): an album of photographs drawn from German military and medical archives from the first world war. In Regarding the Pain of Others, Sontag describes the book as "photography as shock therapy" that was designed to "horrify and demoralize".

It was in the 1930s that the Western anti-war movement took shape, to which the political and organizational roots of most of the existing movement can be traced. Characteristics of the anti-war movement included opposition to the corporate interests perceived as benefiting from war, to the status quo which was trading the lives of the young for the comforts of those who are older, the concept that those who were drafted were from poor families and would be fighting a war in place of privileged individuals who were able to avoid the draft and military service, and to the lack of input in decision making that those who would die in the conflict would have in deciding to engage in it.

In 1933, the Oxford Union resolved in its Oxford Pledge, "That this House will in no circumstances fight for its King and Country."

Veterans were still extremely cynical about the motivations for entering World War I, but many were willing to fight later in the Spanish Civil War, indicating that pacifism was not always the motivation. These trends were depicted in novels such as All Quiet on the Western Front, For Whom the Bell Tolls and Johnny Got His Gun.

=== World War II ===
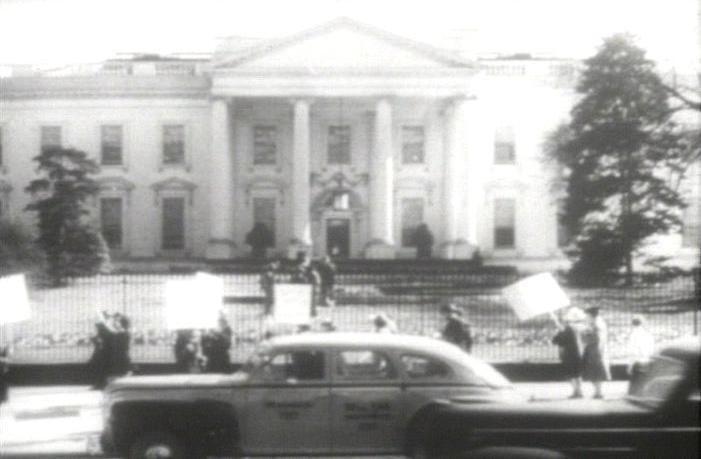
Protest at the White House by the American Peace Mobilization

Opposition to World War II was most vocal during its early period, and stronger still before it started while appeasement and isolationism were considered viable diplomatic options. Communist-led organizations, including veterans of the Spanish Civil War, opposed the war during the period starting with the Molotov–Ribbentrop pact but then turned into hawks after Germany invaded the Soviet Union.

The war seemed, for a time, to set anti-war movements at a distinct social disadvantage; very few, mostly ardent pacifists, continued to argue against the war and its results at the time. However, the Cold War followed with the post-war realignment, and the opposition resumed. The grim realities of modern combat, and the nature of mechanized society ensured that the anti-war viewpoint found presentation in Catch-22, Slaughterhouse-Five and The Tin Drum. This sentiment grew in strength as the Cold War seemed to present the situation of an unending series of conflicts, which were fought at terrible cost to the younger generations.

=== Vietnam War ===
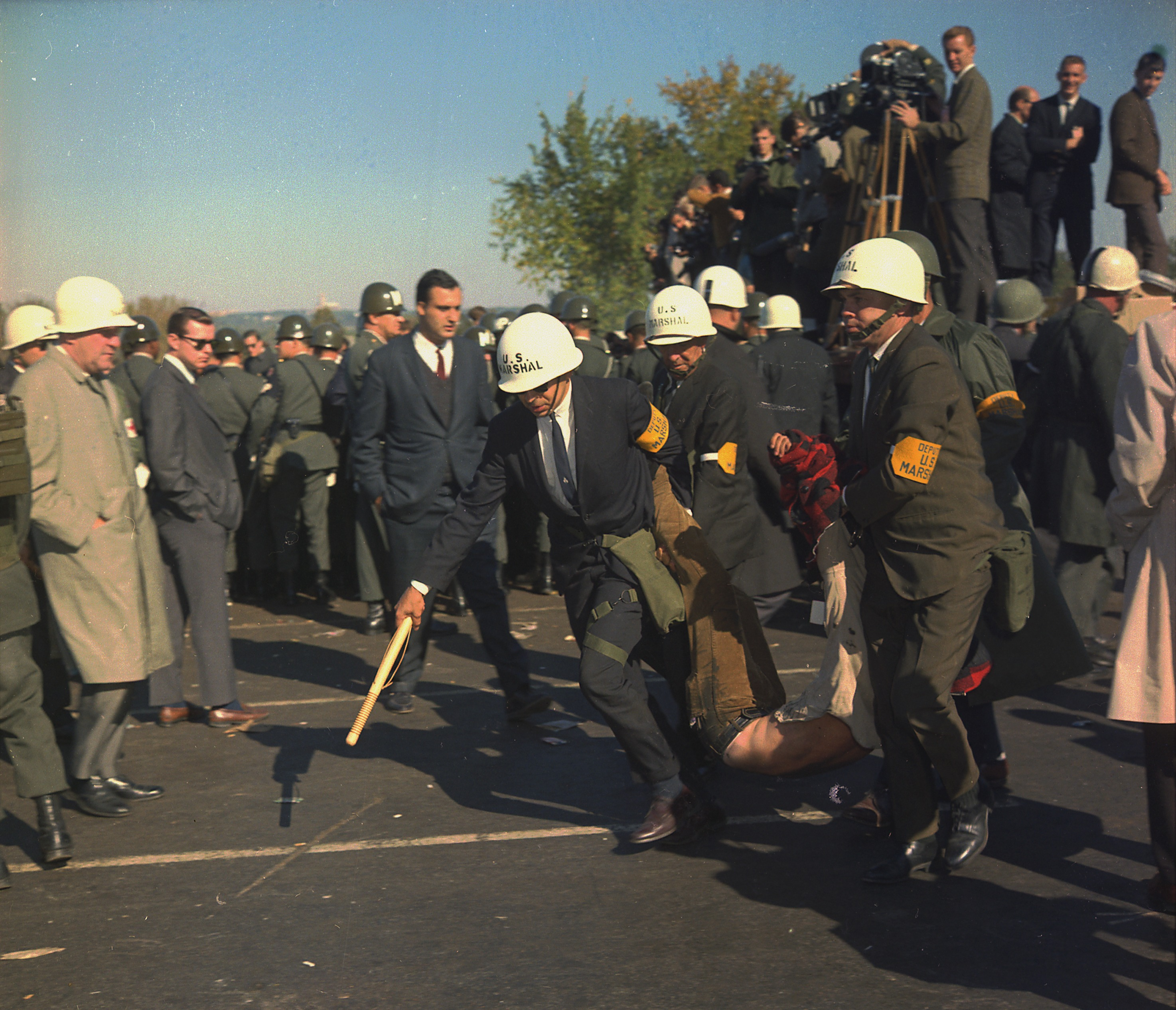
U.S. Marshals arresting a Vietnam War protester in Washington, D.C., 1967

Organized opposition to U.S. involvement in the Vietnam War began slowly and in small numbers in 1964 on various college campuses in the United States and quickly as the war grew deadlier. In 1967 a coalition of anti-war activists formed the National Mobilization Committee to End the War in Vietnam which organized several large anti-war demonstrations between the late 1960s and 1972. Counter-cultural songs, organizations, plays and other literary works encouraged a spirit of nonconformism, peace, and anti-establishmentarianism. This anti-war sentiment developed during a time of unprecedented student activism and right on the heels of the Civil Rights Movement, and was reinforced in numbers by the demographically significant baby boomers. It quickly grew to include a wide and varied cross-section of Americans from all walks of life. The anti-Vietnam war movement is often considered to have been a major factor affecting America's involvement in the war itself. Many Vietnam veterans, including future Secretary of State and U.S. Senator John Kerry and disabled veteran Ron Kovic, spoke out against the Vietnam War on their return to the United States.

Mrs. Ngo Ba Thanh, a Vietnamese peace activist, aligned her Vietnamese Women's Movement for the Right to Live with international activists of the Women's International League for Peace and Freedom (WILPF) and Women Strike for Peace. Her imprisonment and publications about the war brought international attention to the social and economic issues created by the war and fostered international opposition to it. Her arrest and lack of a trial sparked Bella Abzug and WILPF members to write to the United States Congress and petition President Richard Nixon to appeal to South Vietnamese officials for her release, which was widely covered in the press. Campaigns opposing the war and conscription also took place in Australia.

=== South African Border War ===
Opposition to the South African Border War spread to a general resistance to the apartheid military. Organizations such as the End Conscription Campaign and Committee on South African War Resisters, were set up. Many opposed the war at this time.

=== Yugoslav Wars ===
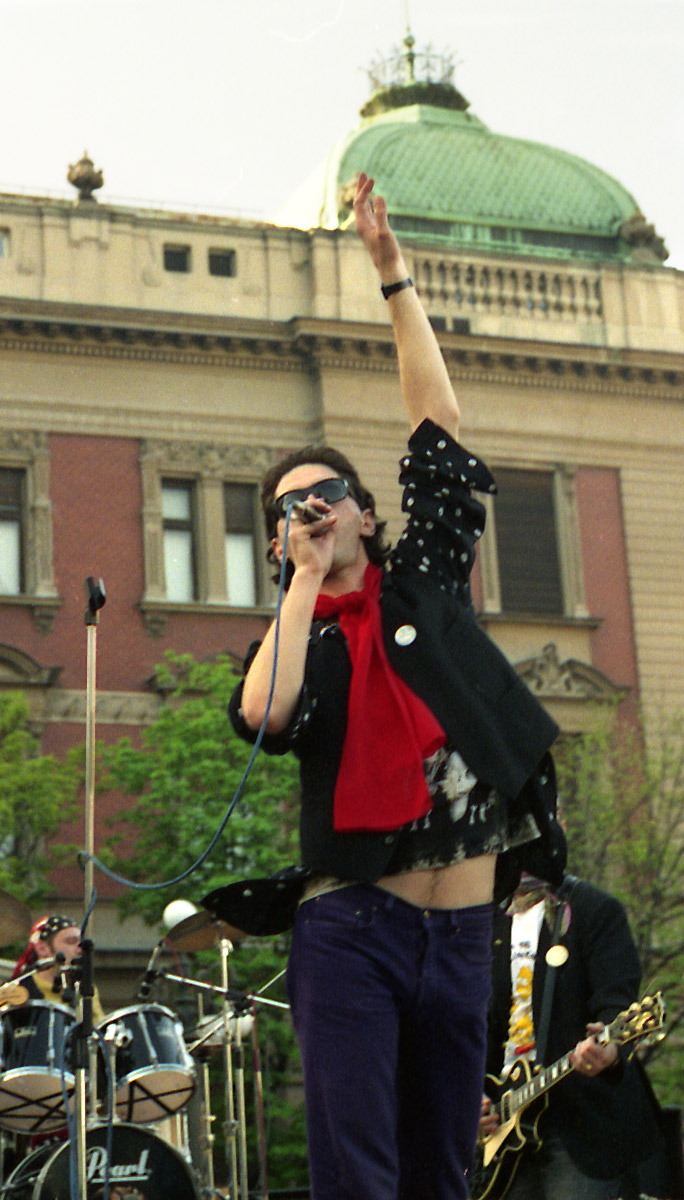
Srđan Gojković performing at the anti-war concert as part of Rimtutituki

Following the rise of nationalism and political tensions after Slobodan Milošević came to power, as well as the outbreaks of the Yugoslav Wars, numerous anti-war movements developed in Serbia. The anti-war protests in Belgrade were held mostly because of opposition the Battle of Vukovar, Siege of Dubrovnik and Siege of Sarajevo, while protesters demanded the referendum on a declaration of war and disruption of military conscription.

More than 50,000 people participated in many protests, and more than 150,000 people took part in the most massive protest called "The Black Ribbon March" in solidarity with people in Sarajevo. It is estimated that between 50,000 and 200,000 people deserted from the Yugoslav People's Army, while between 100,000 and 150,000 people emigrated from Serbia refusing to participate in the war. According to professor Renaud De la Brosse, senior lecturer at the University of Reims and a witness called by the International Criminal Tribunal for the former Yugoslavia (ICTY), it is surprising how great the resistance to Milošević's propaganda was among Serbs, given that and the lack of access to alternative news.

The most famous associations and NGOs who marked the anti-war ideas and movements in Serbia were the Center for Antiwar Action, Women in Black, Humanitarian Law Center and Belgrade Circle. The Rimtutituki was a rock supergroup featuring Ekatarina Velika, Električni Orgazam and Partibrejkers members, which was formed at the petition signing against mobilization in Belgrade.

NATO bombing of Yugoslavia during the Kosovo War triggered debates over the legitimacy of the intervention. About 2,000 Serbian Americans and anti-war activists protested in New York City against NATO airstrikes, while more than 7,000 people protested in Sydney. The most massive protests were held in Greece, and demonstrations were also held in American cities, French cities, Italian cities, London, Moscow, Brussels, Amsterdam, Toronto, Madrid, Berlin, Stuttgart, Salzburg and Skopje.

=== 2001 Afghanistan War ===
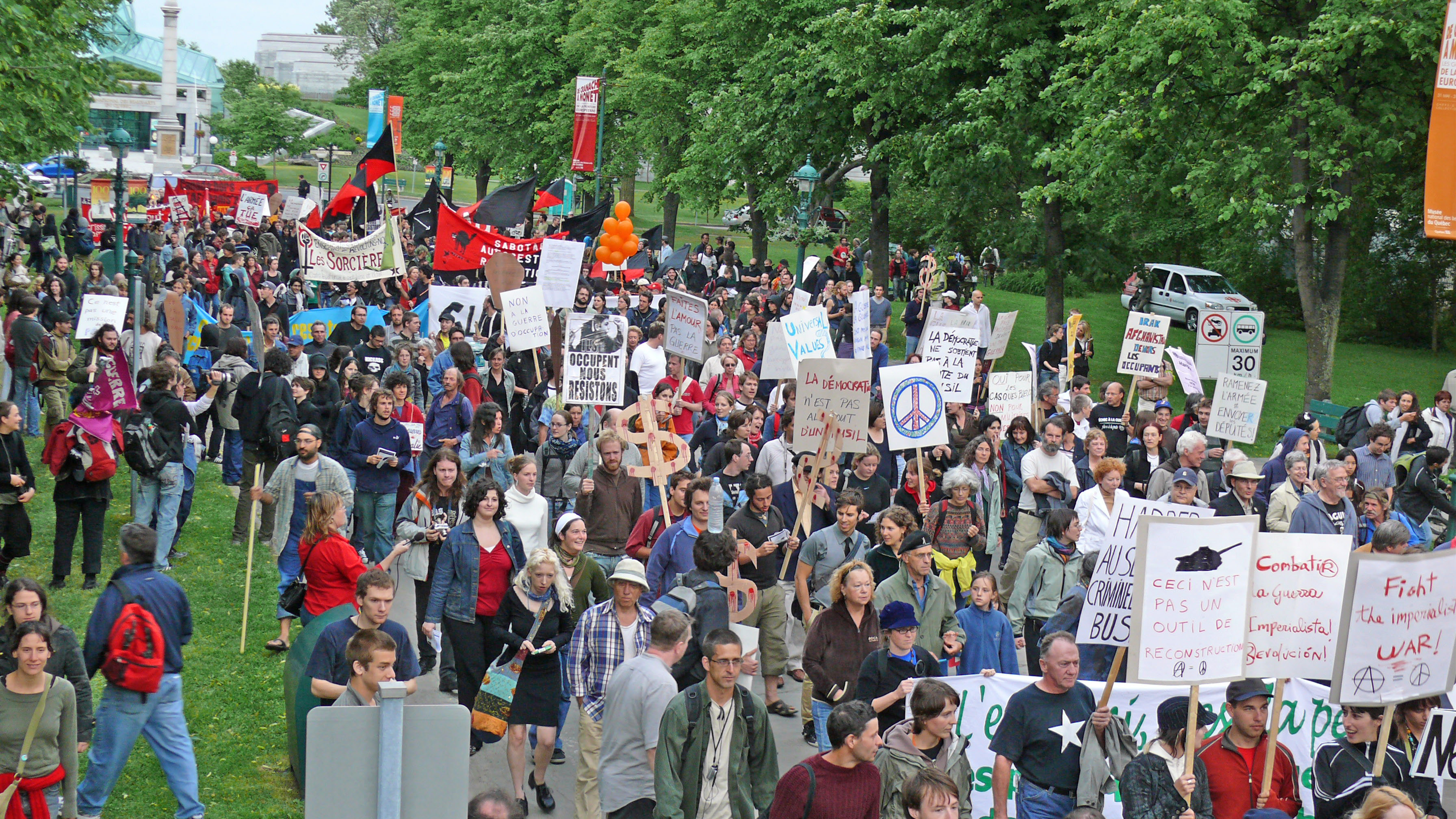
Demonstration in Québec City against the Canadian military involvement in Afghanistan, 22 June 2007

There was initially little opposition to the 2001 Afghanistan War in the United States and the United Kingdom, which was seen as a response to the 11 September 2001 terrorist attacks and was supported by most of the American public. Most vocal opposition came from pacifist groups and groups promoting a left-wing political agenda. Over time, opposition to the war in Afghanistan has grown more widespread, partly as a result of weariness with the length of the conflict and partly as a result of a conflating of the conflict with the unpopular war in Iraq.

=== Iraq War ===
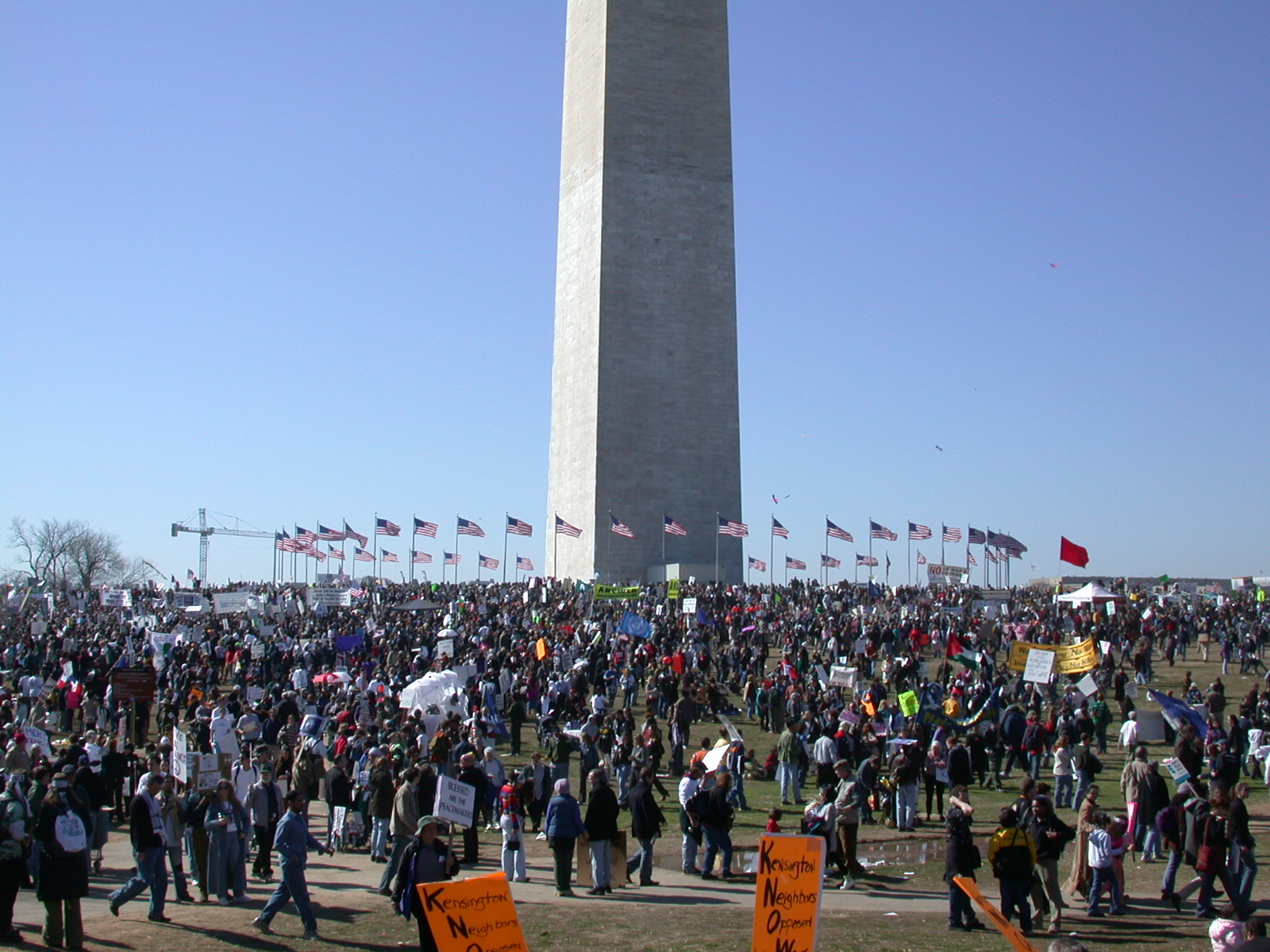
Anti-war rally in Washington, D.C., 15 March 2003

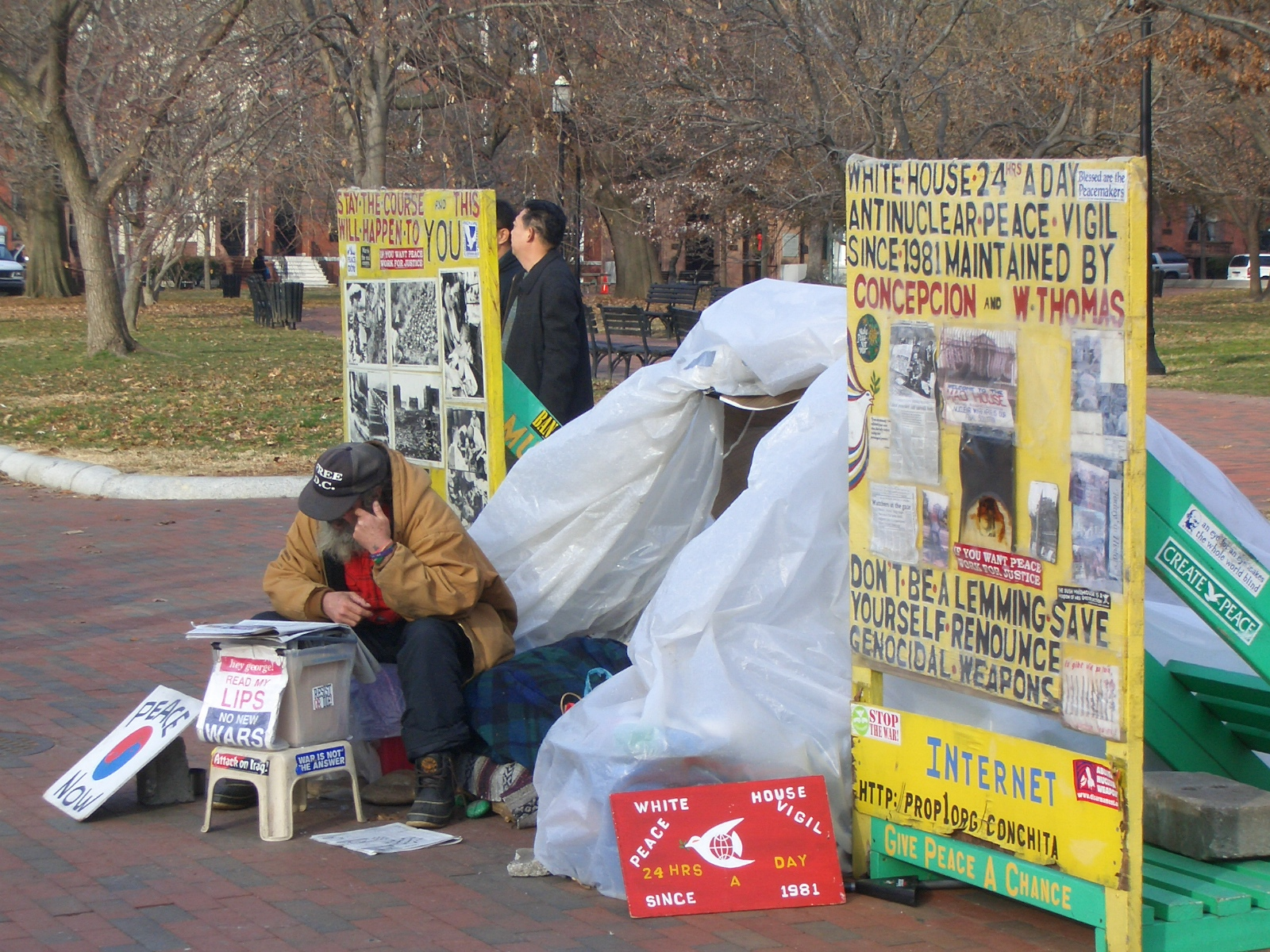
Thomas on the White House Peace Vigil

The anti-war position gained renewed support and attention in the buildup to the 2003 invasion of Iraq by the U.S. and its allies. Millions of people staged mass protests across the world in the immediate prelude to the invasion, and demonstrations and other forms of anti-war activism have continued throughout the occupation. The primary opposition within the U.S. to the continued occupation of Iraq has come from the grassroots. Opposition to the conflict, how it had been fought, and complications during the aftermath period divided public sentiment in the U.S., resulting in majority public opinion turning against the war for the first time in the spring of 2004, a turn which has held since.

The American country music band Dixie Chicks' opposition to the war caused many radio stations to stop playing their records, but they were supported in their anti-war stance by the equally anti-war country music star Merle Haggard, who in the summer of 2003 released a song critical of US media coverage of the Iraq War.

Anti-war groups protested during both the Democratic National Convention and 2008 Republican National Convention protests held in Saint Paul, Minnesota, in September 2008.

=== 2014 Russo-Ukrainian war ===
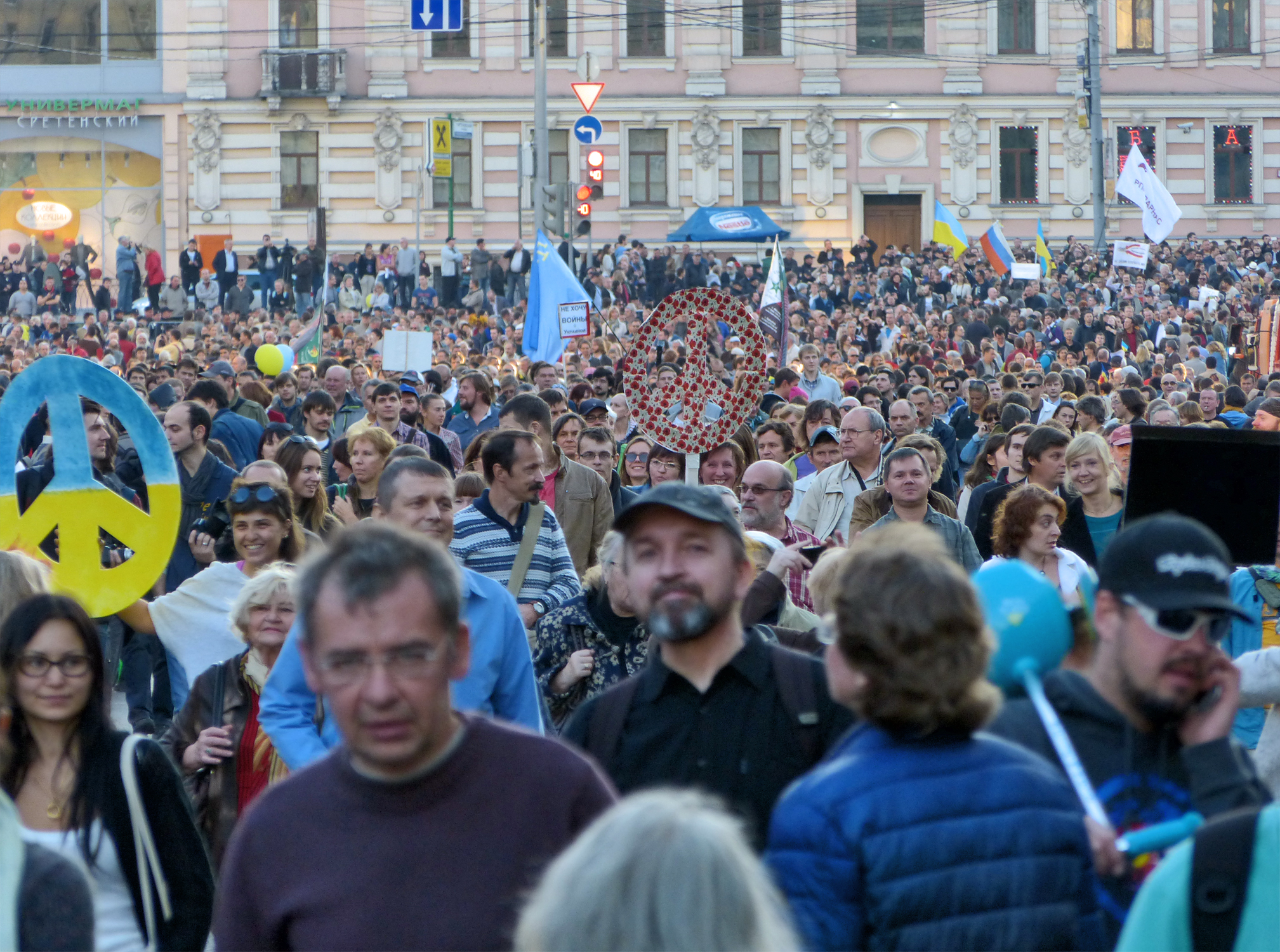
Anti-war/Putin demonstration in Moscow, 21 September 2014

A series of demonstrations were held opposing the Russian military intervention in Ukraine that took place in Russia in 2014. Protesters held two anti-war protest rallies on 2 and 15 March 2014. The latter, known as the March of Peace (Russian: Марш Мира, Marsh Mira), took place in Moscow a day before the Crimean referendum. The protests have been the largest in Russia since the 2011–2013 Russian protests by the Russian opposition against the alleged electoral fraud committed by United Russia during the 2011 Russian legislative election. Reuters reported that around 20,000 people participated in the 15 March demonstrations.

=== Saudi Arabian–led intervention in Yemen ===
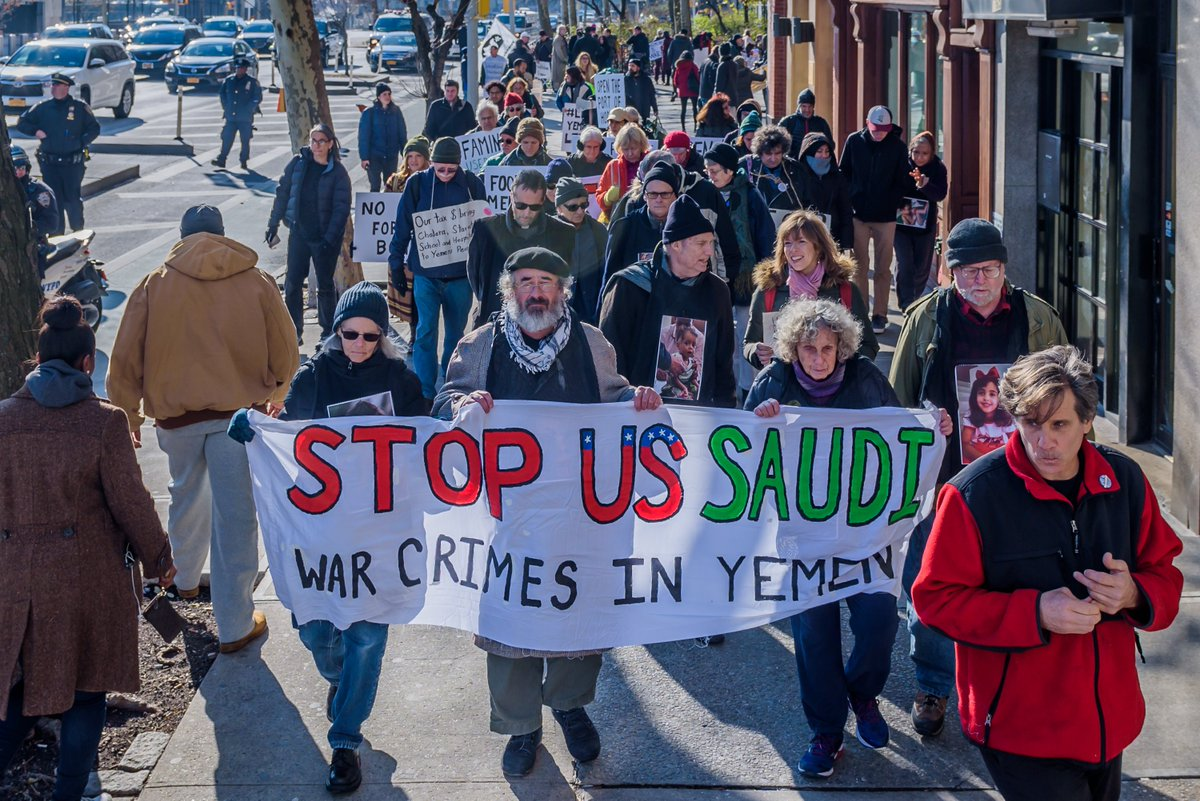
Protest against U.S. involvement in the Saudi Arabian-led intervention in Yemen, New York City, 2017

=== 2021 Israel–Palestine crisis ===
In May 2021, protests broke out following a flare-up of the Israel–Palestine conflict. In the U.S., thousands gathered in at least seven major cities across the country in solidarity with Palestinians. The 2021 conflict lasted from 6 May until 21 May when a ceasefire was signed. The following day, an estimated 180,000 protestors gathered in Hyde Park, England, in what may have been the largest pro-Palestine demonstration in British history. Speeches were made by anti-war campaigners and trade union members including demands that the UK government disinvest and sanction Israel. Messages such as "free Palestine" and "stop the war" were displayed on banners and placards and chanted by protesters. Despite the ceasefire, protests continued into June, with, for example, protestors in Oakland, California, attempting to block an Israeli cargo ship from entering the Port of Oakland on 4 June.

=== 2022 Russian invasion of Ukraine ===
Beginning in 2022, the anti-war movement was renewed following tensions between Russia and Ukraine. Protests escalated in Russia on 24 February 2022, after Russia invaded Ukraine.

Russian President Vladimir Putin introduced prison sentences of up to 15 years for publishing "fake news" about Russian military operations. As of December 2022, more than 4,000 people, including Russian opposition politicians and journalists, had been prosecuted under Russia's "fake news" laws for criticizing the war in Ukraine.

=== 2023 Israel–Gaza war/genocide ===
Multiple protests against the war took place around the world since the start of the Gaza genocide, mostly in support of Palestine.

=== Possible Venezuela War ===
Following the capture of Nicolás Maduro on January 3, 2026 by US forces, there were small protests in Los Angeles and Las Vegas.

=== 2026 Iran war ===
After the assassination of Ali Khamenei on 28 February 2026 by U.S. and Israeli forces, and the outbreak of the 2026 Iran War, anti-war protests emerged in several countries around the world.

== Arts and culture ==
A peace symbol, originally designed for the British Campaign for Nuclear Disarmament movement (CND)

English poet Robert Southey's 1796 poem After Blenheim is an early modern example of anti-war literature that was written generations after the Battle of Blenheim but while Britain was again at war against France.

World War I produced a generation of poets and writers influenced by their experiences in the war. The work of poets, including Wilfred Owen and Siegfried Sassoon, exposed the contrast between the realities of life in the trenches and how the war was seen by the British public at the time and the earlier patriotic verse penned by Rupert Brooke. The German writer Erich Maria Remarque penned All Quiet on the Western Front, which has been adapted for several mediums and has become of the most often cited pieces of anti-war media.

Pablo Picasso's 1937 painting Guernica on the other hand, used abstraction, rather than realism, to generate an emotional response to the loss of life from the Condor Legion and Aviazione Legionaria's bombing of Guernica during the Spanish Civil War. The American author Kurt Vonnegut used science fiction themes in his 1969 novel Slaughterhouse-Five, depicting the bombing of Dresden in World War II, which Vonnegut witnessed.

The second half of the 20th century also witnessed a strong anti-war presence in other art forms, including anti-war music such as "Eve of Destruction", "And the Band Played Waltzing Matilda" and "One Tin Soldier", and films such as M*A*S*H and Die Brücke, opposing the Cold War in general or specific conflicts such as the Vietnam War. The war in Iraq has also generated significant artistic anti-war works, including the American filmmaker Michael Moore's Fahrenheit 9/11, which holds the box-office record for documentary films, and the Canadian musician Neil Young's 2006 album Living with War.

== Anti-war intellectual and scientist-activists and their work ==
Various people have discussed the philosophical question of whether war is inevitable, and how it can be avoided; in other words, what are the necessities of peace. Various intellectuals and others have discussed it from an intellectual and philosophical point of view, not only in public, but participating or leading anti-war campaigns despite its differing from their main areas of expertise, leaving their professional comfort zones to warn against or fight against wars.

=== Philosophical possibility of avoiding war ===
- Immanuel Kant: In (1795) "Perpetual Peace" ("Zum ewigen Frieden"). Immanuel Kant booklet on "Perpetual Peace" in 1795. Politically, Kant was one of the earliest exponents of the idea that perpetual peace could be secured through universal democracy and international cooperation.

=== Leading scientists and intellectuals ===
Here is a list of notable anti-war scientists and intellectuals:

- Linus Pauling was awarded the Nobel Peace Prize for his peace activism (his second Nobel Prize). He circulated multiple petitions among scientists.
- Sigmund Freud and Albert Einstein had correspondences on violence, peace, and human nature.
- Bertrand Russell mostly was a prominent anti-war activist; he championed anti-imperialism. Occasionally, he advocated preventive nuclear war, before the opportunity provided by the atomic monopoly is gone, and "welcomed with enthusiasm" world government. He went to prison for his pacifism during World War I. Later, he campaigned against Adolf Hitler, then criticised Stalinist totalitarianism, attacked the involvement of the United States in the Vietnam War, and was an outspoken proponent of nuclear disarmament. In 1950 Russell was awarded the Nobel Prize in Literature "in recognition of his varied and significant writings in which he champions humanitarian ideals and freedom of thought".

=== Manifestos and statements by scientist and intellectual activists ===
- Albert Einstein, Bertrand Russell and eight other leading scientists and intellectuals signed the Russell–Einstein Manifesto issued 9 July 1955.
- The Mainau Declaration of 15 July 1955 was signed by 52 Nobel Prize laureates.
- The Dubrovnik–Philadelphia Statement of 1974/1976 was signed by Linus Pauling and others.

== See also ==
- Ahimsa
- Anti-militarism
- Anti-war film
- Bed-in
- Civilian-based defense
- Conscientious objector
- Counter-recruitment
- Die-in
- Draft evasion
- Food Not Bombs
- International Day for the Total Elimination of Nuclear Weapons
- List of anti-war organizations
- List of anti-war songs
- List of peace activists
- Male expendability
- Make love, not war
- Nonkilling
- Nonviolence
- Nonviolent resistance
- Nuclear-free zone
- Peace
- Peace movement
- Raging Grannies
- Swords into ploughshares
- Tax resistance
- Teach-in
- War Against War
- War hawk
- War Is a Racket
- War resister
- Women Against War
