= Gde smo sad? =

Studio album by Električni orgazam
- Released: June 1, 2018; July 12, 2018 (vinyl record)
- Genre: Rock
- Label: Mascom Records

Električni orgazam chronology
To što vidiš to i jeste (2010)	Gde smo sad? (2018)

Gde smo sad? (trans. Where are we now?) is the twelfth studio album by Serbian rock group Električni orgazam. It was recorded in the period 2012–2018. The album contains nine songs, of which the hits are the title track, "Bio sam loš", "Istok, zapad, sever jug", "Bila si kao san", and "Duga topla noć".

According to Gile, from time to time we all need to ask ourselves "where are we now", in this moment, in our lives, because we spend too much time in the past or future, and rarely in the present moment.

== Background ==
In 2013, the group had performed in Warsaw. The album from that concert is called Warszava '13. 3 years later, the group releases an album called Puštaj muziku! whose material was recorded at a concert on December 28, 2015, on the occasion of 35 years of work. This was the first album on the vinyl record in 22 years.

In late April and early May 2018, the group went on a North American tour.

== Album ==
Behind the project Gde smo sad? is a top team. The production of the album is signed by Toni Jurij, with whom the group collaborated on several albums. Blagoje Nedeljković Pače and Zoran Radomirović Švaba joined in and played their parts brilliantly. Tanja Mirković, with whom the band collaborated for the first time, designed the excellent cover, while Goranka Matić is responsible for the photos. The song "Okašuka šakata" is the longest song the group has ever recorded.

It was followed by videos for "Bio sam loš", " Istok, zapad, sever jug", "Okašuka šakata", "Bila si kao san" and the title track.

We are very satisfied with this album. We worked on it for more than five years. I have always been inspired by the different experiences I go through in life. That's how it is now. As we constantly go through various changes throughout our lives, inspiration also changes

— Srđan Gojković Gile

== Tracklist ==
No.	Title	Length
1.	"Bio Sam Loš"	4:18
2.	"Istok, Zapad, Sever, Jug"	5:17
3.	"Kamerom Snimam Sve"	3:18
4.	"Odvedi Me Do Rupe"	5:36
5.	"Gde Smo Sad?"	3:22
6.	"Koliko Dugo Već Nema Te"	5:07
7.	"Bila Si Kao San"	4:33
8.	"Duga Topla Noć"	6:26
9.	"Okašuka Šakata"	6:29

== Reception ==
Zoran Stajčić of portal Ravno do dna in his review considers that Gde smo sad? is ranking among the best albums from the beginning of the group's career. He added that it is not an album on which different songs are just strung together, but truly a whole that entices to listen to it live from the first to the last song, if Orgazam wanted to do such a concert, even for 45 minutes, devoid of playing the old tried and tested 'stabs'.

According to Zoran Tučkar of portal muzika.hr, Gde smo sad? offers a variety of smart musical solutions that reveal that the group members really listen to everything and that they are ready to suppress their own preferences for the sake of the song. For those who may be meeting this group for the first time, it's funk-blues-rock, from which some sonic mini-surprise pops out every now and then.

== Personnel ==
- Srđan Gojković – vocals, guitar, percussion
- Zoran Radomirović – bass
- Ljubomir Đukić – vocals, keyboards
- Branislav Petrović – guitar, vocals, harmonica
