= Breskve u teškom sirupu vol. 1 =

Compilation album by Električni Orgazam
- Released: December 25, 2006
- Recorded: 1980
- Genre: New wave, punk rock
- Length: 53:21
- Label: Automatik records
- Producer: Srđan Gojković Gile, Dušan Ercegovac

Električni Orgazam compilations chronology
Najbolje pesme vol. 2 1992-1999 (2002)	Breskve u teškom sirupu vol. 1 (2006)

Professional ratings
Review scores
Source	Rating
Groupie.hr	(mixed)
Popboks	(not rated)
Muzika.hr	1.5/5 stars

Breskve u teškom sirupu vol. 1 is a compilation by the Serbian rock band Električni Orgazam, featuring unreleased material from the band's new wave period. The first part of the compilation featuring the recordings made at the Belgrade Tašmajdan park, and the second part, featuring the recordings made at the band rehearsal at the basement of the Studentski Kulturni Centar, were both recorded in the period before the release of Paket aranžman.

== Track listing ==
=== Koncert na Tašmajdanu 1980 ===
1. "Električni orgazam" (4:21)
2. "Konobar" (1:51)
3. "Infekcija" (4:59)
4. "Zlatni papagaj" (2:22)
5. "Krokodili dolaze" (4:21)
6. "Nebo" (4:58)

=== Proba U Podrumu SKC-a 1980 ===
1. "Zlatni papagaj" (2:40)
2. "Vi" (3:07)
3. "Fleke" (2:32)
4. "Voda u moru" (2:07)
5. "Pojmove ne povezujem" (3:03)
6. "Leptir" (3:32)
7. "Umetnost" (2:08)
8. "I've Got a Feeling" (2:37)
9. "Krokodili dolaze" (3:44)
10. "Nebo" (4:59)

== Personnel ==
- Srđan Gojković Gile (guitar, vocals)
- Ljubomir Jovanović Jovec (guitar)
- Goran Čavajda Čavke (drums)
- Ljubomir Đukić Ljuba (organ, vocals)
- Marina Vulić (bass)
