= To što vidiš to i jeste =

Studio album by Električni Orgazam
- Released: 2010
- Recorded: January 2009 – May 2010; El. Org. and Go-go studios
- Genre: Rock, pop rock, house
- Length: 41:42
- Label: Dom omladine Beograda
- Producer: Vojislav Aralica

Električni Orgazam chronology
Harmonajzer (2002)	To što vidiš to i jeste (2010)	Gde smo sad? (2018)

Professional ratings
Review scores
Source	Rating
Barikada	link
Glas.ba	link
Mikrofonija	Favorable link
Sound Guardian	link
TPortal	link
Muzika.hr	link
TMM	link

To što vidiš to i jeste (What You See is What You Get) is the tenth studio album by the Serbian rock band Električni Orgazam, released in September 2010 by the Dom omladine Beograda record label. The album is the first one since Kako bubanj kaže to feature the keyboard player and vocalist Ljubomir Đukić.

The album is distributed unlike any of the previous band's releases. For the first two months it is only available as a throw-in gift with the purchase of m:ts mobile provider's pre-paid package that costs RSD200 (around €2 as of November 2010). After that, the album featuring an alternative cover sleeve as well as several additional tracks will be available through the regular label and its distribution channels.

Promotional video was recorded for the opening track, "Nemaš nikom ništa da daš (You have got nothing to give to anyone)".

== Track listing ==
All lyrics by Srđan Gojković, all music and arrangements by Branislav Petrović, Ljubomir Đukić and Srđan Gojković.

No.	Title	Length
1.	"Nemaš nikom ništa da daš" (You have got nothing to give to anyone)	3:54
2.	"Noć me zove" (The night is calling me)	4:16
3.	"Bliži Suncu" (Closer to the Sun)	7:08
4.	"Ti to možeš" (You can do it)	5:02
5.	"Pokaži mi (kakav je tvoj grad)" (Show me (what your town is like))	5:25
6.	"Nikad ne znam" (I never know)	10:56
7.	"Vrati Se" (Come back)	4:50
8.	"Mister ministar" (Mr. Minister)	4:49
9.	"Gde god odem" (Wherever I go)	4:25
10.	"Da da da da" (Yes, yes)	8:00

== Personnel ==
=== Električni Orgazam ===
- Švaba (Zoran Radomirović) — bass
- Pače (Blagoje Nedeljković) — drums
- Banana (Branislav Petrović) — guitar, vocals, harmonica, recorded by, edited by, bass [track 1]
- Gile (Srđan Gojković) — vocals, guitar, guitar [wah wah]
- Ljuba (Ljubomir Đukić) — vocals, keyboards

=== Additional personnel ===
- Dragomir Mihailović "Gagi" — guitar [tracks 5 and 6]
- Vojislav Aralica — percussion, producer, mixed by
- Stefan Đinović — mixed by [assistant]
