= Braćo i sestre =

Live album by Električni Orgazam
- Released: 1987
- Recorded: October 17, 18 and 19, 1986; Kulušić, Zagreb
- Genre: Garage rock Punk rock Rock
- Length: 41:05
- Label: Jugoton
- Producer: Ivan Stančić Piko, Srđan Gojković Gile

Električni Orgazam live chronology
Warszava '81 (Live EP) (1982)	Braćo i sestre (1987)	Seks, droga, nasilje i strah / Balkan Horror Rock (1992)

Braćo i sestre is the first live album by the Serbian rock band Električni Orgazam, released in 1987.

== Track listing ==
All tracks by Srđan Gojković Gile, except where noted.

1. "Svaka nova noć" (3:30)
2. "Klinci traže zabavu" (2:10)
3. "Debela devojka" (2:32)
4. "Nebo" (Ljubomir Jovanović, Đorđe Otašević) (2:07)
5. "I'm Waiting For My Man" (Lou Reed) (2:55)
6. "Krokodili dolaze" (6:05)
7. "Bejbe, ti nisi tu (Mick Jagger, Keith Richards(3:35)
8. "Pođimo" (2:15)
9. "Kako bubanj kaže" (4:04)
10. "Locomotion" (Carole King, Gerry Goffin (3:03)
11. "Ne postojim" (2:20)
12. "Ja sam težak kao konj" (2:30)
13. "Konobar" (Ljubomir Đukić) (2:15)

== Personnel ==
- Srđan Gojković Gile (guitar, vocals)
- Branislav Petrović Banana (guitar)
- Zoran Radomirović Švaba (bass)
- Goran Čavajda Čavke (drums)

=== Additional personnel ===
- Dražen Vrdoljak (band introduction)
- Ljubomir Đukić (lead vocals on track 10)
