= Letim, sanjam, dišem =

Studio album by Električni orgazam
- Released: February 12, 1988
- Genre: Garage rock, new wave
- Label: PGP RTB
- Producer: Piko Stančić; Srđan Gojković "Gile"

Električni orgazam chronology
Distorzija (1986)	Letim, sanjam, dišem (1988)	Seks, droga, nasilje i strah / Balkan Horror Rock (1992)

Letim, sanjam, dišem (literal translation:I fly, I dream, I breathe) is the sixth studio album by Serbian/Yugoslavian new wave band Električni orgazam. It was released in 1988 by PGP RTB.

== Track listing ==
All songs written by Srđan Gojković except where noted. Arranged by Električni Orgazam.

=== "Ova Strana" (This Side) ===
1. "Igra Rok' En' Rol cela Jugoslavija"
2. "Svi Ljudi I Sve Žene"
3. "Ti"
4. "Sve što radim, radim za nju"
5. "Kad sve devojke budu moje"

=== "Ona Strana" (That Side) ===
1. "Poljubi me i priznaj mi"
2. "(Hajde bejbe) Daj da vidim sad"
3. "Ona uvek želi sve"
4. "Sve ste vi naše devojke" (drums — Piko Stančić)
5. "Sunce zna da Mesec zna"

== Personnel ==
- Švaba (Zoran Radomirović) — bass guitar
- Čavke (Goran Čavajda) — drums, backing vocals
- Anton (Nebojša Antonijević) — guitar
- Banana (Branislav Petrović) — guitar, backing vocals
- Gile (Srđan Gojković) — guitar, lead vocals
- Saša Lokner — keyboards
