= Harmonajzer =

Studio album by Električni Orgazam
- Released: 2002
- Recorded: May – July 2002; PGP RTS 5 Studio
- Genre: Stoner Rock; Rock
- Length: 46:03
- Label: PGP RTS
- Producer: Dušan Kojić, Srđan Gojković and Branislav Petrović

Električni Orgazam chronology
A um bum (1999)	Harmonajzer (2002)	To što vidiš to i jeste (2010)

Professional ratings
Review scores
Source	Rating
Rock Express	9/10 stars

Harmonajzer (Harmonizer) is the ninth studio album by the Serbian rock band Električni Orgazam, released by PGP RTS in 2002.

== Background ==
In 2000, Gile participated in the creation of Vlada Divljan's album Sve laži sveta (All the Lies of the World). The following year, Gile participates in the Musicians for Children with Love project alongside Rambo Amadeus, Bajaga and many others. Gile also performed in Zagreb after more than 10 years. Before second concert in Zagreb, three Croatian police officers from the drug unit raided (in civilian clothes) at around 7 pm CEST in the popular KSET, where the concert was to be held (the first one was held in "Tvornica kulture"), and after finding a small amount of heroin in Gile's possession, they took him away from himself to the police station in Đorđićeva street.

== Track listing ==
1. "Danas nisam sasvim svoj" (2:49)
2. "Istina nema kraj" (3:11)
3. "Neka sada vide svi" (2:25)
4. "Nebo broji korake" (4:26)
5. "Ko se sada seća svega" (2:23)
6. "Senke zidova" (4:32)
7. "Promene" (3:17)
8. "РECTOPAH 3 ОPA" (1:43)
9. "Zato stojim sam" (4:57)
10. "Tome neće doći kraj" (2:54)
11. "Protiv sebe" (7:30)
12. "Đankarlo Gingiva ponovo jaše" (2:49)
13. "Ona šeta psa" (3:12)

== Personnel ==
- Srđan Gojković Gile (vocals, guitar)
- Zoran Radomirović Švaba (bass)
- Branislav Petrović Banana (guitar, vocals, bass on track 7, lead vocals on 7 and 10, organ on 5 and 9)
- Blagoje Nedeljković Pače (drums)

=== Additional personnel ===
- Dule Petrović (saxophone on tracks 1 and 4)
- Zoran Erkman (trumpet on tracks 1 and 4)
- Boris Bunjac (backing vocals on tracks 2, 3 and 6, percussion on 11)
- Zdenko Kolar (backing vocals on tracks 2, 3 and 6)
- Nemanja Kojić Kojot (trombone on 4)
- Dušan Kojić Koja (rhythm guitar on tracks 7 and 9, acoustic guitar on 8)
- Vlada Divljan (guitar on track 9)
- Ljubomir Djukić Ljuba (lead vocals on track 9)
