= Električni Orgazam =

Serbian rock band

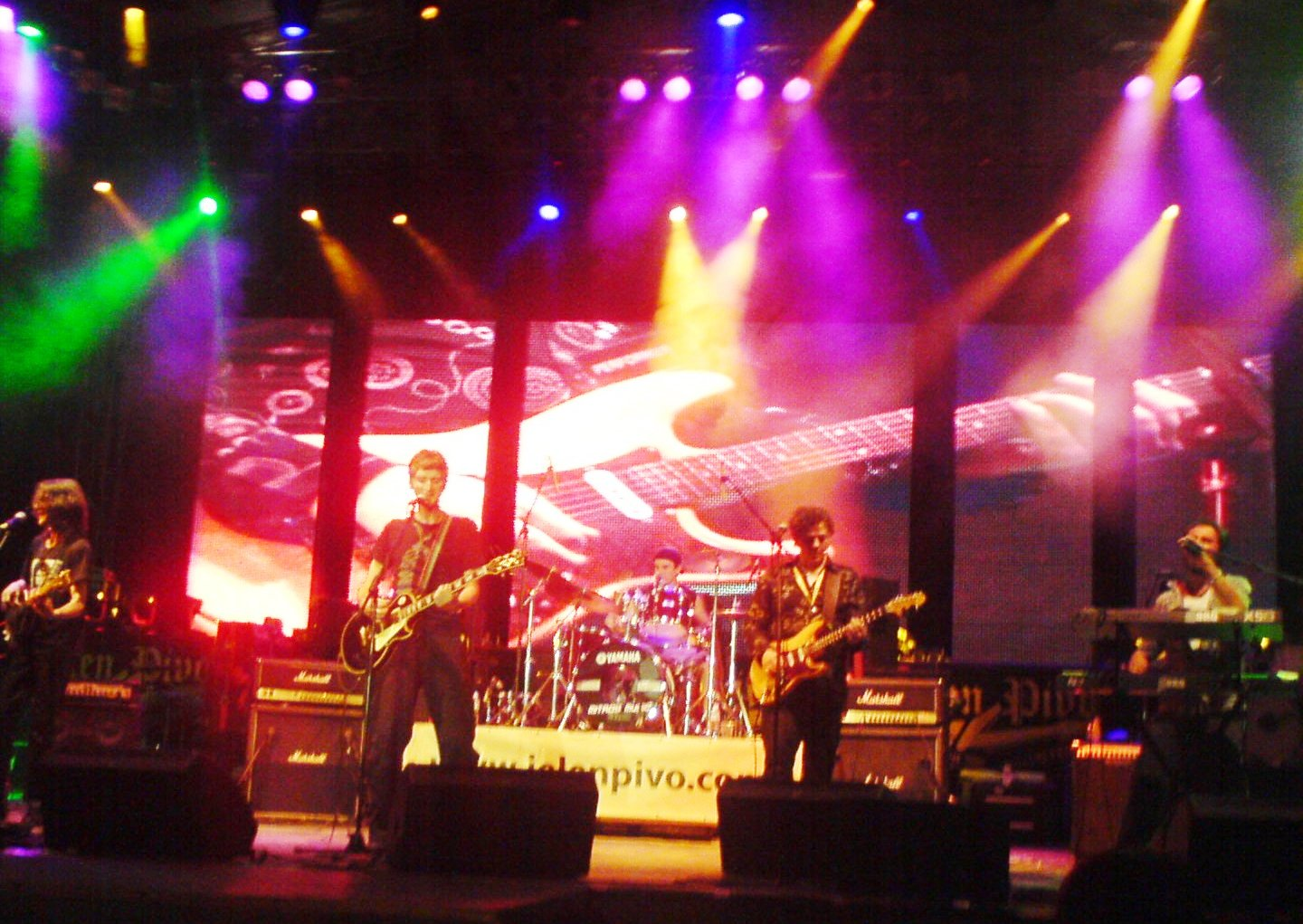
- Električni Orgazam performing at the Jelen Pivo Live festival in 2008

Background information
- Also known as: El. Org., Elektryczny Orgazm
- Origin: Belgrade, SR Serbia, Yugoslavia
- Genres: Punk rock; new wave; power pop; post-punk; neo-psychedelia; garage rock; rock
- Years active: 1980–1989; 1991–present
- Labels: Jugoton, PGP-RTB, PGP-RTS, B92, City Records, Automatik, Mascom
- Members: Srđan Gojković; Ljubomir Đukić; Zoran Radomirović; Blagoje Nedeljković; Branislav Petrović
- Past members: see the members section
- Website: www.elektricniorgazam.com

Električni Orgazam (Serbian Cyrillic: Електрични Оргазам, lit. 'Electric Orgasm'; Macedonian: Електричен Оргазам; Slovene: Električni Orgazem) is a Serbian (formerly Yugoslav) rock band formed in Belgrade in 1980. Originally starting as a combination of new wave, punk rock and post-punk, the band later slowly changed their style, becoming a mainstream rock act. They were one of the most notable acts of the former Yugoslav rock scene.

== History ==
=== New wave years (1980–1983) ===
The melodic hard rock band Hipnotisano Pile (Hypnotized Chicken), formed in 1979, which got the name by the line from the Iggy Pop song "Lust For Life", consisted of Srđan Gojković "Gile" (drums), Ljubomir Jovanović "Jovec" (guitar), Bojan Banović (vocals), Vladan Stepanović (guitar), "Džo" Otašević (keyboards). The band performed their own material, mainly written by Banović, on Guitar festivals in Belgrade.

In mid-January 1980, at the Mornar bistro, after a Leb i Sol concert held at the Belgrade Dom Sindikata, Hipnotisano Pile members, drummer Gojković and guitarist Jovanović, were sitting with organ player Ljubomir Đukić "Ljuba", and planning to form an ad hoc punk rock group, in which Gojković was to play guitar and sing lead vocals, and Jovanović to switch to playing drums. The band was to play as an opening act for Hipnotisano Pile. The idea for the band name came from Gojković, and, while they were waiting for the waiter, Đukić wrote the lyrics for the song "Konobar" ("The Waiter"). Soon after, Gojković wrote a few more songs, "Krokodili dolaze" ("Crocodiles Are Coming"), "Zlatni papagaj" ("Golden Parrotbill"), and "Vi" ("You"). The band was officially formed on 13 January 1980 and was completed with guitarist Goran Sinadinović and bassist Marina Vulić.

The band members then went to Momčilo Rajin and Nebojša Pajkić, both of them in charge of the SKC program, asking for the rehearsal room and booking their first live appearance. In June 1980, the band played as an opening act for Hipnotisano Pile in front of the crowd of about 300 people. Dissatisfied with the Hipnotisano Pile performance, more than half of the audience left the hall. After the performance, Hipnotisano Pile disbanded. Sinadinović also left Električni Orgazam, and with Bojan Banović formed the band Petar i Zli Vuci. Jovanović returned to playing guitar, and the drummer became former Butik drummer Goran Čavajda "Čavke", whom Gojković asked on several occasions to join the band.

The lineup had their first live appearance at a local party, and, soon after, at the Palilula Culture Olympics, where they stopped the performance due to the unsatisfactory amplification. In autumn the same year, the band performed at the Festival Omladina, which was arranged by Riblja Čorba leader Bora Đorđević. Before the performance, the band was warned not to move too much on the stage which had several levels and was unstable. The reaction of the band was quite the opposite, breaking microphones, cymbals, and kitschy stage decorations, eventually getting disqualified. The festival was the place where new wave bands from Belgrade and Zagreb had met for the first time, and the Zagreb band Film won the festival.

The following year, the band had their first recordings, the songs "Krokodili dolaze", "Zlatni papagaj" and "Vi", released by Jugoton on the Paket aranžman (Package deal), three way split album, with the recordings of Idoli and Šarlo Akrobata. The compilation was to feature two more bands, Tunel, and the embryonic Bajaga i Instruktori called Fleke, but were eventually turned down. The success of Paket aranžman provided the band an opportunity to record and release their debut album under the same label. The band was previously turned down by RTV Ljubljana, stating that the album lacked originality, and PGP-RTB, which had problems with the song lyrics for "Krokodili dolaze" and "Nebo" ("The Sky").

Električni orgazam, produced by Ivan Stančić "Piko", featured the band's authentic sound, found in the songs "Nebo", "Konobar", "I've Got a Feeling", both released on the band first single, and new versions of "Krokodili dolaze" and "Vi". The album did not feature the band drummer Čavajda, who was at the time serving the Yugoslav People's Army, being temporarily replaced by Grupa I member Branko Kuštrin "Mango". The album, for which the album cover and design was done by Gojković, had positive reactions by both the audience and the critics, including a review of the album by the NME journalist Kris Bohn, who stated that the band was one of the most exciting non-British acts. Since Gojković was spending time in London, he provided the New Musical Express with a few copies of the album, resulting in the band signing with Rough Trade Records for distributing the copies of the album to England. After the album release, in autumn 1981, Marina Vulić left the band, being replaced by Jovan Jovanović "Grof", and Čavajda returned to the group.

In the meantime, the band met a student from Poland, Grzegorz Brzozowicz, who had contacts with the people from the Warsaw club Rivijera Remont, gathering the fans of new wave and punk rock. Bzozovič arranged the three bands from Paket aranžman to perform in Poland, and after Šarlo Akrobata, in November, the band went on a tour of Poland, playing six dates, four Warsaw, one at Kraków, and one at Kalisz. The performance of 8 November, at Rivijera Remont, was recorded on a simple tape recorder, later released on the six-song Warszawa '81 EP, limited to 2000 copies, being the first official bootleg in former Yugoslavia. The rough recordings were post-produced by Slobodan Konjović, presenting a valid document of the band sound, as well as the audience reaction, not accustomed to visiting punk rock concerts. During the performance of the song "Konobar", there was a half-minute sound equipment failure, during which a member of the audience dropped tear gas. The disturbance was documented on the record, which featured two new songs, "Leptir" ("The Butterfly") and "Razgovori" ("Conversations").

The album Lišće prekriva Lisabon (Leaves Fall Over Lisbon) was recorded at the Ljubljana Tivoli Studio, produced by the band themselves with the help of Toni Jurij. The album, which got the name by the title of the Serbian translation of the Barbara Cartland novel Lovers in Lisbon, featured seventeen songs, presenting a new aspect of the band's work, gradually influenced by psychedelic rock, with all the tracks having one-word song titles. Gojković later stated that the during the writing process the band was experimenting with LSD, which influenced the outbreak of the album. The songs "Afrika" ("Africa") and "Alabama", a cover version of The Doors interpretation of the Bertolt Brecht poem, featured Gojković and Đukić sharing vocals duties. The song "Dokolica" ("Idleness"), also released on single with the dub version of the song on B-side, featured the lyrics Gojković found in a sociology book, and the songs "Leptir", "Odelo" ("Suit") and "Podstanar" ("Sub-tenant"), deal with the problems of urban alienation. The album featured guest appearance by the trumpet player Petar Ugrin on the songs "Alabama" and "Leptir".

In autumn 1983, Gojković and Ivan Stančić "Piko", influenced by the New York City underground scene, formed the band Hijene (Hyenas), and recorded the album WooDoo za početnike (Voodoo For Beginners). However, dissatisfied with the record label treatment, the album was never released, but it did inspire the recording of the band fifth album Distorzija (Distortion). The next discography release was the unexpected cover album Les Chansones Populaires (French for Popular songs), produced by Gojković, Đukić, Toni Jurij and Piko Stančić, who also played drums due to Čavajda being in prison, featuring eight cover versions, including the David Bowie "The Man Who Sold The World", T.Rex "Metal Guru", The Doors "When the Music's Over", and Little Eva "Locomotion", the latter also released on single. The tour following the album release featured Mango Kuštrin on drums.

=== Personnel crisis, mainstream success, disbandment (1984–1989) ===
In 1984, when they were about to enter the studio in order to record the fourth studio album, the band lineup changed, as the drummer Čavajda returned to the band and guitarist Jovanović left the band. With guest appearances by Ivan Pajević (guitar), Piko Stančić (drums), Goran Pojatić (piano), Kire Mitrev (trombone), Ivan Švager (saxophone), and Goce Dimitrovski (trumpet), the band recorded the album Kako bubanj kaže (As The Drum Decides), musically influenced by the early 1970s work of the Rolling Stones, also suggested by the album artwork. Like on all of the previous releases, vocal duties were shared between Gojković and Đukić. The track "Fras u šupi" ("Seizure In The Shed"), which appeared on the album, was a part of the trilogy, beside the story collection, written by David Albahari, and the poem of the same name, written by Miloš Komadina in his poetry book Etika trave (Grass Ethics). The song music and lyrics were written by Gojković, except for "Pričam o tebi" ("I Am Talking About You"), for which the music was written by Čavajda.

The album did not repeat the success of the previous releases, leading Đukić to leaving the band and moving to New York. The band, being in the personnel crisis, firstly featured Ivan Pajević on guitar, then former Siluete member Nikola Čuturilo, until the full-time member became Branislav Petrović "Banana", a former Bezobrazno Zeleno and Pasta ZZ member. In 1986, when the band was about to record the album Distorzija, bassist Jovanović left the band and stopped his musical career. His replacement was the former Katarina II and Du-Du-A member Zoran Radomirović "Švaba". The comeback album, Distorzija, with simple rock songs, featured the hit songs "Debela devojka" ("Fat Girl"), "Ja sam težak kao konj" ("I Am Heavy As A Horse"), "Ne postojim" ("I Do Not Exist"), "Vudu bluz" ("Voodoo Blues"), "Kapetan Esid" ("Captain Acid"), "Ša la la" ("Sha La La"), and "Lui Lui" ("Louie Louie"), a cover of Richard Berry song. The album was produced by Gojković and Stančić, and the cover for the album was done by the painter Radovan Hiršl.

The next release was the live album Braćo i sestre (Brothers And Sisters), recorded in October 1986 at the Zagreb club Kulušić. The album, featuring the guest introduction by Dražen Vrdoljak and guest vocals by Ljubomir Đukić on the song "Locomotion", included the new track "Bejbe, ti nisi tu" ("Baby, You Are Not Here"), a cover version of the Rolling Stones song "Out of Time". Two years later, in 1988, the band, with the same musical style, released the album Letim, sanjam, dišem (Flying, Dreaming, Breathing), and the songs "Igra rock 'n' roll cela Jugoslavija" ("The Whole Yugoslavia Is Dancing To Rock And Roll"), "Ti" ("You"), "Poljubi me i priznaj mi" ("Kiss Me And Confess"), and "Sve ste vi naš devojke" ("All of You Are Our Girlfriends") became immediate hits. The album was produced by Gojković, Stančić and Theodore Yanni, and featured guest appearance by Partibrejkers guitarist Nebojša Antonijević "Anton" and Bajaga i Instruktori keyboard player Saša Lokner.

On Summer of the same year, the band promoted the album with a concert at Tašmajdan Stadium. During the same year, they released the greatest hits compilation album Najbolje pesme 1980-1988 (The Best Songs 1980–1988), and disbanded. Radomirović and Petrović joined the band Trans. Gojković pursued a solo career, releasing his first solo album Evo sada vidiš da može (Now You See It Is Possible), released in 1989, and worked on the Kako je propao rokenrol (The Fall of Rock 'N' Roll) and Crni bombarder (Black Bomber) movie soundtracks. With Vlada Divljan, he released two music albums for children Rokenrol za decu (Rock 'N' Roll For Children), and Rokenrol bukvar (Rock 'N' Roll Alphabet), and the two, with Stančić and Radomirović, released the album Lutka koja kaže ne (A Doll That Says No). Čavajda went to Australia in 1988, and returned in 1991, joining Gojković and Radomirović on the Lutka koja kaže ne tour.

=== Reformation, Čavajda's departure (1991–1994) ===
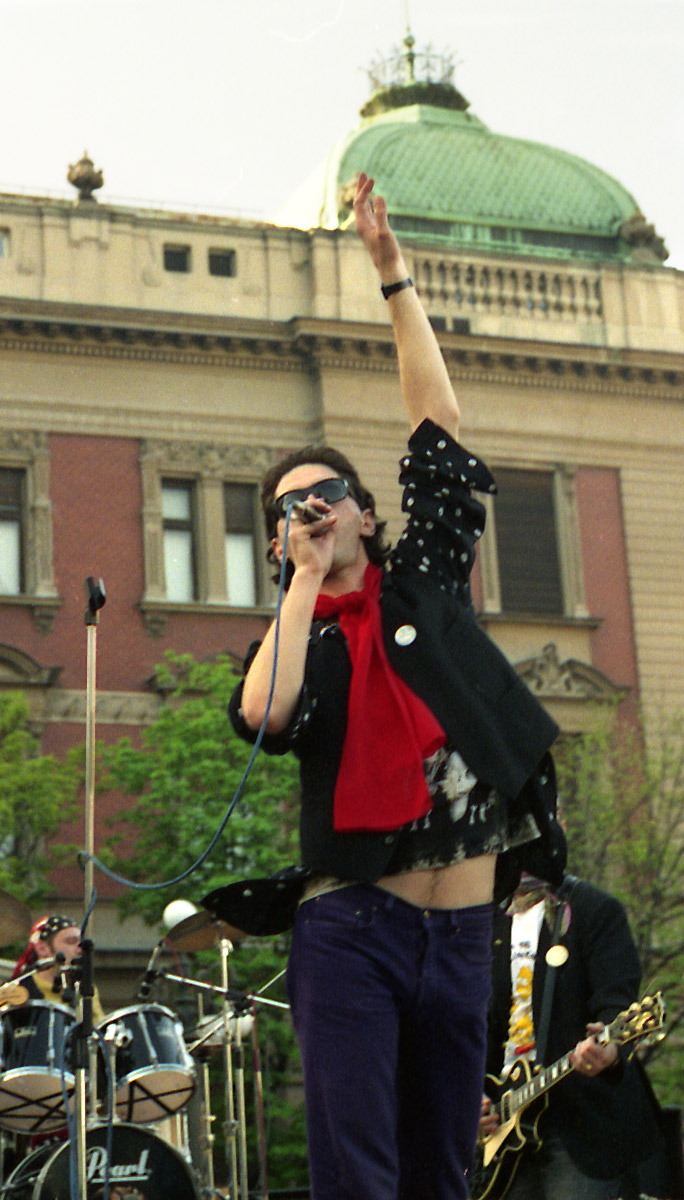
Srđan Gojković "Gile" (center) and Goran Čavajda "Čavke" (far left) performing with Rimtutituki in 1992

The reformed Električni Orgazam released the compilation album Seks, droga, nasilje i strah / Balkan Horror Rock (Sex, Drugs, Violence and Fear / Balkan Horror Rock), featuring new studio material on the A-side, including "Mala lopta metalna" ("Little Metal Ball") composed by Čavajda and Gojković, and live recordings, made at the Novi Sad concert performance. The followup, the live album Balkan Horror Rock II, released on compact cassette only, featured the rest of Novi Sad concert recordings and "Svečane bele košulje" ("Ceremony White Shirts") and "Mjau, mjau" ("Meow, Meow"), made at the B92 birthday concert. The album covers for both releases were designed by Linda Čavajda, Čavajda's wife.

In 1992, Čavajda, Gojković and Radomirović, with Ljubomir Jovanović, Ekatarina Velika frontman Milan Mladenović, and Partibrejkers members Zoran Kostić "Cane" and Nebojša Antonijević "Anton" formed the anti-war group Rimtutituki, recording the single "Slušaj 'vamo" ("Listen Up"), released by Radio B92. The following year, in September, the band, with Ekatarina Velika, Partibrejkers, and the Zagreb band Vještice, performed in Prague and Berlin on the concerts entitled Ko to tamo pjeva (Who's That Singing Over There). Električni Orgazam was also one of the first Serbian bands to perform in Ljubljana after the independence of Slovenia on early 1991, with the band Majke from Vinkovci, also playing in Maribor, Koper and Hum. At the time, the band often performed in the Republic of Macedonia.

The double album Zašto da ne! (Why Not!), featuring a stylistic combination of Lišće prekriva Lisabon and Distorzija combined with the 1990s musical trends, was recorded with guitarist Dejan Radisavljević "Role", a former Revolveri member, keyboard player Zoran Zagorčić, a former Du-Du-A member, and Srđan Todorović as the second drummer. As guests on the album appeared Zoran Kostić "Cane" (vocals), politician Nenad Čanak (flute), Nenad Racković (backing vocals), and Neša Petrović (saxophone). The acoustically oriented song sections for the album were composed by Petrović, who co-written the song "Dajem ljubav" ("I Give Love") with Zagorčić. By Gojković's idea, the album cover was designed by Džukele guitarist Leonid Pilipović, expanding it with a short comic-book.

After the album release, Čavajda left the band, completely devoting himself to the band Babe, formed in 1992, and was replaced by the former Pasta ZZ and Partibrejkers member Vlada Funtek.

=== Lineup changes, comeback releases (1995–2003) ===
In early 1995, the band celebrated their fifteenth anniversary at the Belgrade club Prostor, and, in July, performed at the London club The Bottom Line. The recordings from the performance were used by Marina Vulić, who lived in London since 1985, working as video producer, for the release of a promotional video. On 17 April 1996 the band performed an unplugged concert at the Novi Sad Studio M, featuring the band introduction by Zdenko Kolar, and guest appearances by Margita Stefanović (piano, Farfisa organ), Boris Bunjac (percussion), and Deže Molnar (saxophone). The album, recorded with the new drummer Miloš Velimir "Buca", featured a cover version of the Korni Grupa song "Magična ruka" ("Magic Hand").

Beside working with Električni Orgazam, Gojković played in the Vlada Divljan Old Stars Band, producing their live album Odbrana i zaštita (Defence And Protection), and performed on their studio album Sve laži sveta (All The Lies of the World), released by Automatik Records in 2000. Founding the Yellow Dog records, Gojković re-released most of the Električni Orgazam releases on compact disc, featuring bonus material. The debut album featured the three songs from Paket aranžman, Lišće prekriva Lisabon featured the "Dokolica" dub version, Kako bubanj kaže featured "Tetovirane devojke" ("Tattooed Girls"), the title track single B-side, and the previously unreleased "Slatka mala devojčica" ("Sweet Little Girl"), Seks, droga, nasilje i strah / Balkan Horror Rock and Balkan Horror Rock II were released as a single CD, featuring the bonus track "Hodam sad kao zombi", a cover of the Roky Erickson "I Walked with a Zombie" with Gojković on lead vocals, and the live EP Warszava '81 was expanded with ten live recordings from the Polish tour.

On 10 July 1998 the band, in the lineup Gojković, Petrović, bassist Zdenko Kolar, and drummer Ivan Ranković "Raka", a former Tvrdo Srce i Velike Uši and Ekatarina Velika member, guest starred the concert featuring bands from former Yugoslav republics. The following year, the band recorded the comeback CD A um bum (A 'oom Boom), featuring guest appearances by numerous rock veterans, Kornelije Kovač, Branko Marušić "Čutura", Bata Kostić, and the younger musicians, keyboard player Slobodan Misailović and drummers Ivan Ranković and Srđan Todorović. The cataclysmic drawings on the album cover were done by Gojković, and the album featured the Dylanesque acoustic rock sound. Lead vocals for the tracks "Gde da nađem takvu devojku" ("Where Would I Find Such A Girl"), and "Ja nisam znao neke stvari" ("I Did Not Know Some Things") were done by Petrović.

In May 2000, the band performed at the Zagreb club Tvornica, and the KSET performance was canceled due to the arrest of Gojković by the police which found 0,22 grams of heroin in his possession. The media gave much attention to the affair, and Gojković was released after a night in prison, where the police officers asked for autographs and taking pictures with him, with a fee of 250 Deutsche Marks.

The compilation album Najbolje pesme vol. 2 1992-1999 (The Best Songs Volume 2 1992–1999), featuring the selection of the tracks recorded in the 1990s. The following album, Harmonajzer, produced by Dušan Kojić "Koja", Gojković and Petrović, featured the new drummer Blagoje Nedeljković "Pače", and guest appearances by Vlada Divljan (wah guitar), Zoran Erkan "Zerkman" (trumpet), Nemanja Kojić "Kojot" (trombome), Dušan Petrović (saxophone), Zdenko Kolar and Boris Bunjac (backing vocals). Ljuba Đukić did the lead vocals for the track "Zato stojim sam" ("That Is Why I Stand Alone"), and Petrović sang lead vocals for "Promene" ("Changes") and "Tome neće doći kraj" ("It Would Not End"). Radomirović and Kojić co-wrote two instrumental tracks, "Đankarlo Gingva ponovo jaše" ("Giancarlo Gingva Rides Again") and "PECTOPAH 3 OPA" (false friend pun for "RESTAURANT DAWN").

=== Reunion with Đukić (2004–present) ===
In September 2004, Ljuba Đukić officially returned to the group, and, in 2006, the band released the compilation album Breskve u teškom sirupu vol. 1 (Peaches in Heavy Syrup Volume 1), using the unused album title of the album Lišće prekriva Lisabon, featuring the rehearsal recordings made at the Belgrade SKC and the performance at Tašmajdan Stadium, both recorded in 1980. The band then went on a nine-dates mini tour, performing the songs from the new wave period in a modern and rearranged manner, including the last concert at the Belgrade Dom Omladine, featuring guest appearance by the founding band member Ljubomir Jovanović "Jovec". The whole concert was recorded and the recordings were released on the live album ElOrgNewWave, by Mascom in 2007. During the same year, on 14 July, the band performed as an opening act for the Rolling Stones, on their concert in Belgrade's Ušće park. In September the same year, the band went on their first United States tour.

On 28 September 2008, the band performed at the 30th anniversary of new wave music in Yugoslavia at the concert held in the Zagreb Tvornica kulture, along with the most notable participants of the Yugoslav new wave, including Darko Rundek of Haustor, Pero Lovšin of Pankrti, Jasenko Houra and Davorin Bogović of Prljavo Kazalište and Vlada Divljan of Idoli. The songs "Konobar", "Krokodili dolaze", "Leptir", "Nebo", and "Zlatni papagaj" performed at the concert were released on the live album Sedmorica veličanstvenih – 30 godina kasnije (The Magnificent Seven – 30 Years Later). In December 2009, Croatia records, the heir of Jugoton, released the double compilation album The Ultimate Collection, the only one so far to feature the selected material from all the studio releases, and the song selection for the album was provided by Miloš Ivanović "Kepa", the music editor of Radio B92. On 11 January the following year, the band celebrated their 30th anniversary at the Belgrade Akademija club, featuring the premiere of the new single, the song "Nemaš nikome ništa da daš" ("You Have Nothing To Share"), with the entire concert being available for live Internet streaming.

Eight years since the release of the previous studio album, the album To što vidiš to i jeste (What You See Is What You Get), was released in early September 2010, under the Belgrade Dom Omladine label, with Telekom Srbija as the main distributor for the first two months. Produced by Vojislav Aralica, who also recorded percussion sections, the album featured seven songs, including "Pokaži mi" ("Show me") and "Nikad ne znam" ("I never Know") on which as guest guitarist appeared the former Katarina II member Dragomir Mihajlović "Gagi". In a month's period during which the promotion had lasted, the album was sold in 50,000 copies. On 1 November of the same year, the single "Nemaš nikome ništa da daš" appeared on the first place of the Jelen Top Ten list, remaining on the first place for two weeks. The following month, the Croatian record label Dallas Records released an expanded edition of the album for the former Yugoslav territory, featuring three new studio tracks, "Mister Ministar" ("Mister Minister"), "Gde god odem" ("Wherever I Go") and "Da, da, da, da" ("Yes, Yes, Yes, Yes"), and the band went on a tour across Slovenia and Croatia. In January 2011, To što vidiš to i jeste was voted No. 7 on the list of Best Domestic Albums in 2010 by the readers of online magazine Popboks and No. 9 according to the Popboks critics. The following month, on 2 February, the band got the Oskar popularnosti award for the Best Serbian Rock Act in 2010. In May 2010, a deluxe edition of the album was released, containing a new song entitled "Sedam dana (je nekad dovoljno)" ("Seven Days (Is Enough Sometimes)"), live versions of the songs "Mentalno" ("Mentally"), "Ja želim promene (baby, baby, baby)" ("I Want Changes (Baby, Baby, Baby)") and "Kako bubanj kaže" ("As the Lot Says"), a cover of the Ekatarina Velika song "Krug" and edited versions of the songs "Nemaš nikom ništa da daš", "Mister Ministar", "Ti to možeš" and "Bliži suncu" with music videos for the same songs.

In 2013, the band released the double live album Warszawa '81/Warszawa '13 for the Polish market only. The first disc of the album represents the reissue of Warszawa '81 live album, and the second the recording of the band's 2013 concert in Warszawa.

In November 2015, the band released the single "Bio sam loš" ("I Was Bad"), in order to mark their 35th anniversary, at the same time announcing their new studio album, Gde smo sad? (Where Are We Now?). The band celebrated 35 years of activity with a Serbian tour, starting on 26 December with a concert in Belgrade Youth Center. On April 22, 2016, the band performed, alongside Riblja Čorba, Van Gogh, Piloti and Galija, on the opening of renovated Tašmajdan Stadium. At the end of 2016, Električni Orgazam released the live album Puštaj muziku! (Play the Music!), featuring the recordings from their 35th anniversary concert in Belgrade Youth Center. The album was released on vinyl only, in a limited number of copies. At the same time the band celebrated the 30th anniversary of Distorzija with a number of concerts in Serbia.

At the beginning of June 2018, the band released their twelfth studio album, entitled Gde smo sad? (Where Are We Now?, through Mascom. The album was previously announced by singles "Bio sam loš", "Kamerom snimam sve" ("I'm Recording Everything with My Camera"), released in May 2016, "Istok, zapad, sever, jug" ("East, West, North, South"), released in October 2016, "Bila si kao san" ("You Were Like a Dream"), released in May 2017 and "Duga, topla noć", described by Gojković as "the first real blues track Električni Orgazam recorded", released in June 2017.

== Legacy ==
The book YU 100: najbolji albumi jugoslovenske rok i pop muzike (YU 100: The Best albums of Yugoslav pop and rock music) features two Električni Orgazam albums: Distorzija, ranked No. 24, and Kako bubanj kaže, ranked No. 73. In the same book, Paket aranžman was ranked No. 2. In 1987, in YU legende uživo (YU Legends Live), a special publication by Rock magazine, Braćo i sestre was pronounced one of 12 best Yugoslav live albums.

The Rock Express Top 100 Yugoslav Rock Songs of All Times list featured two songs by Električni Orgazam, "Igra rock 'n' roll cela Jugoslavija" (polled No.9) and "Nebo" (polled No.42). The B92 Top 100 Domestic Songs list features two songs by Električni Orgazam: "Nebo", ranked No. 26, and "Krokodili dolaze", ranked No. 72. In 2011, the song "Igra rock 'n' roll cela Jugoslavija" was polled, by the listeners of Radio 202, one of 60 greatest songs released by PGP-RTB/PGP-RTS during the sixty years of the label's existence.

The lyrics of 10 songs by the band were featured in Petar Janjatović's book Pesme bratstva, detinjstva & potomstva: Antologija ex YU rok poezije 1967 - 2007 (Songs of Brotherhood, Childhood & Offspring: Anthology of Ex YU Rock Poetry 1967 – 2007).

== Members ==
Current members

- Srđan Gojković "Gile" – guitar, lead vocals, backing vocals, production (1980–1989, 1991–present)
- Branislav Petrović "Banana" – lead guitar, backing vocals, lead vocals, organ, piano, violin, xylophone (1985–1989, 1991–present)
- Zoran Radomirović "Švaba" – bass guitar, backing vocals (1986–1989, 1991–present)
- Blagoje Nedeljković "Pače" – drums (2002–present)
- Ljubomir Đukić "Ljuba" – keyboards, backing vocals, lead vocals (1980–1984, 2004–present)

Former members

- Goran Sinadinović – guitar (1980)
- Goran Čavajda "Čavke" – drums, backing vocals (1980–1989, 1991–1994)
- Ljubomir Jovanović "Jovec" – guitar (1980–1984)
- Marina Vulić – bass guitar (1980–1981)
- Jovan Jovanović "Grof" – bass guitar, production (1981–1986)
- Ivan Pajević – guitar (1984)
- Nikola Čuturilo "Čutura" – (1984)
- Dejan Radisavljević "Role" – guitar (1994)
- Zoran Zagorčić – organ, piano (1994)
- Srđan Todorović "Žika" – drums (1994)
- Vlada Funtek – drums (1994–1996)
- Miloš Velimir "Buca" – drums (1996–2002)
- Zdenko Kolar – bass guitar (1998)
- Ivan Ranković "Raka – drums (1998)

== Discography ==
- Električni orgazam (1981)
- Lišće prekriva Lisabon (1982)
- Les Chansones Populaires (1983)
- Kako bubanj kaže (1984)
- Distorzija (1986)
- Letim, sanjam, dišem (1988)
- Zašto da ne! (1994)
- A um bum (1999)
- Harmonajzer (2002)
- To što vidiš to i jeste (2010)
- Gde smo sad? (2018)
- U magli sjaji (2026)

== Bibliography ==
- EX YU ROCK enciklopedija 1960–2006, Janjatović Petar; ISBN 978-86-905317-1-4
- Moj život je novi val, Kostelnik Branko, 2004; ISBN 953-7052-48-6
