= Električni orgazam (album) =

Studio album by Električni Orgazam
- Released: 21 May 1981
- Studio: Radio Zagreb Studio
- Genre: New wave; punk rock
- Length: 31:45
- Label: Jugoton
- Producer: Ivan "Piko" Stančić

Električni Orgazam chronology
Paket aranžman (1981)	Električni orgazam (1981)	Lišće prekriva Lisabon (1982)

Električni orgazam (transl. Electric Orgasm) is the debut album by Serbian new wave band Električni Orgazam. It was released on 21 May 1981 by Jugoton.

== Track listing ==
All tracks are written by Srđan Gojković except where noted. All songs arranged by Električni Orgazam except where noted.

Side A
No.	Title	Lyrics	Music	Length
1.	"Električni orgazam"			4:31
2.	"Konobar"	Ljubomir Đukić	Đukić	2:07
3.	"Krokodili dolaze"			3:33
4.	"Voda u moru"			1:39
5.	"Infekcija"			3:34
Total length:				15:24

Side B
No.	Title	Lyrics	Music	Arrangement	Length
6.	"Vi"	Snežana Vukičević	Gojković		2:30
7.	"Fleke"				2:25
8.	"I've Got a Feeling"	Lennon–McCartney	Lennon–McCartney	Gojković	2:25
9.	"Pojmove ne vezujem"				2:40
10.	"Umetnost"				1:46
11.	"Nebo"	Đorđe Otašević	Ljubomir Jovanović		4:35
Total length:					16:21

== Personnel ==
- Marina Vulić – bass guitar
- Mango (Branko Kuštrin) – drums
- Ljubomir Jovanović – guitar
- Srđan Gojković – guitar, vocals
- Ljubomir Đukić – organ, piano, vocals
- Mladen Škalec – engineer
