= Odelo =

Single by Električni Orgazam

from the album Lišće prekriva Lisabon
- B-side: "Afrika"
- Released: 1982
- Recorded: Tivoli Studio, Ljubljana; 1982
- Genre: New wave, post-punk, alternative rock
- Length: 2:00
- Label: Jugoton
- Songwriter: Srđan Gojković
- Producer: Toni Jurij

Električni Orgazam singles chronology
| "Dokolica" (1982) | "Odelo" (1982) | "Locomotion" (1983) |

"Odelo" is the third single by Serbian new wave band Električni Orgazam and the second single from the Lišće prekriva Lisabon album.

== Track listing ==
Both tracks written by Srđan Gojković

- "Odelo" (2:00)
- "Afrika" (1:55)

== Personnel ==
- Srđan Gojković (guitar, vocals)
- Ljubomir Đukić (keyboards, vocals)
- Jovan Jovanović (bass)
- Goran Čavajda (drums, percussion)
- Ljubomir Jovanović (guitar)
