= A um bum =

Studio album by Električni Orgazam
- Released: 1999
- Recorded: November 5 – December 1, 1999; M Studio, Novi Sad, Pink Studio, Belgrade
- Genres: Alternative rock Pop rock
- Length: 55:28
- Label: City Records
- Producers: Srđan Gojković Gile, Branislav Petrović Banana

Električni Orgazam chronology
Zašto da ne! (1994)	A um bum (1999)	Harmonajzer (2002)

A um bum (A oom boom) is the eighth studio album by the rock band Električni Orgazam. It was released in 1999 on City Records. This is the only album the band had released under the record company.

== Track listing ==
All tracks written by Srđan Gojković, except tracks 10 and 12 written by Srđan Gojković and Branislav Petrović

1. "A um bum" (2:47)
2. "Hajde reci sada ti" (2:12)
3. "I nikog nema da nas probudi" (3:05)
4. "Sam sa tobom" (4:11)
5. "Gde da nađem takvu devojku?" (2:28)
6. "Reči lete baš bez veze" (3:43)
7. "Kakav je to svet?" (3:48)
8. "Neka vetar nosi" (4:35)
9. "Suze nisu dovoljne (da te operu)" (3:59)
10. "Danas je dan" (2:53)
11. "Kad si sam" (3:07)
12. "Ja nisam znao neke stvari" (3:15)
13. "Više nikad kao nekad" (4:45)
14. "Nemoć, bes i očaj" (8:14)
15. "Princeza" (2:32)

== Personnel ==
- Srđan Gojković Gile (lead vocals, guitar, backing vocals, stylophone)
- Zoran Radomirović Švaba (bass)
- Branislav Petrović Banana (guitar, lead vocals, backing vocals, organ, stylophone)
- Miloš Velimir Buca (drums)

=== Additional personnel ===
- Ivan Ranković Raka (drums on tracks 1 and 11)
- Srđan Todorović (backing vocals on track 5, tambourine on 7, vocals on 7 and 10)
- Bata Kostić (guitar on track 7)
- Erik Nikolić (vocals on tracks 7 and 8)
- Slobodan Misailović (piano on track 9)
- Kornelije Kovač (klavsen on track 11, synthesizer on 13, mini moog on 14)
- Branko Marušić Čutura (lead vocals on 14)
