= Distorzija =

Studio album by Električni orgazam
- Released: 1986
- Recorded: November 1985 to March 1986 at "Jadran Film" Studio
- Genre: Power pop, pop rock
- Label: Jugoton
- Producer: Piko Stančić; Srđan Gojković

Električni orgazam chronology
| Kako bubanj kaže (1984) | Distorzija (1986) | Letim, sanjam, dišem (1988) |

Distorzija (Distortion) is the fifth studio album by the Serbian/Yugoslavian new wave band Električni orgazam. It was released in 1986 by Jugoton.

== Track listing ==
All songs are written by Srđan Gojković except where noted. Arranged by Električni Orgazam.

=== "A" side ===
1. "Vudu bluz"
2. "Lui Lui" (music by Richard Berry, voice — Ivana Korolija)
3. "Svaka nova noć"
4. "Ša la la"
5. "Debela devojka"

=== "B" side ===
1. "Ja sam težak kao konj"
2. "Vidim svoj lik"
3. "Ne postojim"
4. "Horor bugi" (music by Čavke and Švaba)
5. "Hej ti"
6. "Kapetan Esid"

== Legacy ==
In 2015 Distorzija album cover was ranked 92nd on the list of 100 Greatest Album Covers of Yugoslav Rock published by web magazine Balkanrock.

== Personnel ==
- Švaba (Zoran Radomirović) — bass guitar, piano
- Čavke (Goran Čavajda) — drums, piano, backing vocals
- Banana (Branislav Petrović) — guitar, harmonica, backing vocals
- Gile (Srđan Gojković) — vocals, guitar
