= Zašto da ne! =

Studio album by Električni orgazam
- Released: November 19, 1994
- Recorded: 10 May – 10 July 1994 at Studio M, Novi Sad and Studio 5 PGP RTS, Belgrade
- Genre: Alternative rock
- Label: PGP RTS
- Producer: Srđan Gojković "Gile"

Električni orgazam chronology
Seks, droga, nasilje i strah / Balkan Horror Rock (1992)	Zašto da ne! (1994)	A um bum (1999)

Professional ratings
Review scores
Source	Rating
Ritam	3.5/5 stars

Zašto da ne! (Why Not!) is the seventh studio album by Serbian/Yugoslav band Električni orgazam. It was released in 1994 by PGP RTS. It is the band's first double album.

== Track listing ==
Lyrics by Petrović (tracks: A3, D5), Čavajda (tracks: A2, D5), Gojković (tracks: A1 to C4, C6 to D6), Todorović (A3) and Radomirović (C5). Music by Petrović (tracks: A4, A5, B3, B4, C2 to C4, D3, D5, D6), Čavajda (tracks: C5, D5), Gojković (tracks: A1 to B3, B5 to C4, C6 to D6) and Zagorčić (B4). Arranged by Petrović (tracks: A1, A3 to B1, B3 to B5, C1 to C4, C6 to D6), Čavajda (tracks: A2, C5, D5), Gojković (tracks: A1 to C1, C3, C4, C6 to D6), Todorović (tracks: A2, A3), Radomirović (tracks: B2, B4, C1, C2, D1) and Zagorčić (B4).

=== "A" Side ===
1. "Keine Macht Den Drogen" (flute – Nenad Čanak, vocals (refrain) – Nenad Racković)
2. "I. D. J. S."
3. "Nikog više ne čekam" (saxophone – Neša Petrović)
4. "Ja sam sasvim normalan"
5. "Zašto da ne"

=== "B" Side ===
1. "Kažu da te vratim mami"
2. "Daj mi sklonište" (vocals – Manja, Cane)
3. "Ovaj put je tvoj" (flute – Nenad Čanak, violin – Štukelja)
4. "Dajem ljubav"
5. "Spojimo se sad" (saxophone – Neša Petrović)
6. "Prljava mala devojčica"

=== "C" Side ===
1. "Moj život je paranoja" (vocals – Cane)
2. "Oslobodi se (U krugu svetlosti)"
3. "Da si tako jaka"
4. "A ti me opet zoveš"
5. "Škloke ploke flonge"
6. "Rasipam se"

=== "D" Side ===
1. "Metadonska terapija"
2. "Prestani" (vocals [refrain] – Manja, Cane)
3. "Jak kao kamen"
4. "Halucinacije"
5. "Huni i Avari naviru"
6. "Sijaj sad kao novo Sunce"

== Personnel ==
- Švaba (Zoran Radomirović) — bass guitar, vocals
- Čavke (Goran Čavajda) — drums, didgeridoo, vocals
- Banana (Branislav Petrović) — guitar, vocals, organ, piano, violin, xylophone
- Srđan Gojković "Gile" — vocals, guitar
- Srđan Todorović "Žika" — drums, percussion, tambourine
- Dejan Radisavljević "Role" — guitar (tracks: A4, B1, C3, C4, C6, D3)
- Zoran Zagorčić — organ, piano (tracks: B2, B4, B5, C1, C4, D2 to D4)
