= Seks, droga, nasilje i strah / Balkan Horor Rock =

Compilation album by Električni Orgazam
- Released: 1992
- Recorded: 1992; Studio M, Novi Sad
- Genre: Rock
- Length: 40:25
- Label: PGP RTB
- Producer: Srđan Gojković Gile

Električni Orgazam compilations chronology
| Najbolje pesme 1980-1988 (1988) | Seks, droga, nasilje i strah / Balkan Horor Rock (1992) | Zašto da ne! (1994) |

Seks, droga, nasilje i strah / Balkan Horor Rock is a compilation by the Serbian rock band Električni Orgazam. The compilation, featuring new studio material on the A-side and live material on the B-side, was recorded at the Novi Sad Studio M. The material, together with the follow-up, the live album Balkan Horor Rok II, was rereleased on one CD by Yellow Dog Records.

== Track listing ==
All tracks by S. Gojković except where noted.

=== Seks, droga, nasilje i strah ===
1. "Mentalno" (3:38)
2. "Sad ti je teško" (2:30)
3. "Mala lopta metalna (G. Čavajda, S. Gojković)(4:45)
4. "Ja mogu još" (2:46)
5. "Seks, droga, nasilje i strah" (5:14)

=== Balkan Horror Rock ===
1. "Vudu bluz" (3:15)
2. "Krokodili dolaze (5:10)
3. "Afrika" (2:05)
4. "Vi" (S. Vukićević, S. Gojković) (2:20)
5. "Ša la la" (5:03)
6. "Zlatni papagaj" (2:00)

== Personnel ==
- Srđan Gojković Gile (guitar, vocals)
- Branislav Petrović Banana (guitar, vocals)
- Goran Čavajda Čavke (drums)
- Zoran Radomirović Švaba (bass)
