= Dokolica =

Single by Električni Orgazam

from the album Lišće prekriva Lisabon
- Released: 1982
- Genre: New wave
- Label: Jugoton
- Songwriter: Srđan Gojković
- Producer: Toni Jurij

Električni Orgazam singles chronology
"Konobar" (1981)	"Dokolica" (1982)	"Odelo" (1982)

"Dokolica" ("Boredom") is the second single recorded and released by the Serbian new wave band Električni Orgazam. It was released in 1982 by Jugoton. The song also appeared on the band's second album Lišće prekriva Lisabon and various artists compilation Vrući dani i vrele noći.

This 7" marks its place in the Yugoslav discography as one of the first providing a dub version on the B-side.

== Track listing ==
A "Dokolica"
B "Dokolica" (dub verzija)

== Personnel ==
- Arranged and produced by Električni Orgazam
- Producer: Toni Jurij
- Written by Srđan Gojković
