= Konobar =

Single by Električni Orgazam

from the album Električni orgazam
- B-side: "I've Got a Feeling"
- Released: 1981
- Recorded: Radio Zagreb Studio; 1981
- Genre: New wave
- Length: 2:08
- Label: Jugoton
- Songwriter: Ljubomir Đukić
- Producer: Ivan Stančić Piko

Električni Orgazam singles chronology
"Konobar" (1981)	"Dokolica" (1982)

"Konobar" ("Waiter") is the first single recorded and released by the Serbian new wave band Električni Orgazam. It was released in 1981 by Jugoton. The song also appeared on the band's debut album and several various artists compilations. The track is actually the first ever song written by the band.

== History ==
Hipnotisano Pile members gathered one evening in the "Mornar" Kafana in Belgrade and decided to form one more band. The band would feature Hipnotisano Pile members but they would play different instruments. The lead vocalist was chosen to be Srdjan Gojkoviċ Gile who was the band's drummer. The first appearance the band was to have at Palilula Guitar festival, so the band had to write and prepare some material within a month. The first song "Konobar" was written that evening by Ljubomir Đukić while they were waiting for the waiter to come.

Having participated in the Paket aranžman project with Idoli and Šarlo Akrobata, the band started preparing their debut album and the only single from the record was chosen to be "Konobar". For the B-side the band chose to record a cover version of The Beatles' track I've Got a Feeling. A different mix of the song appeared on the debut album.

The track was later included on a Jugoton compilation Svi marš na ples!. Live version of the song also appeared on several of the band's live releases.

== Track listing ==
1. "Konobar" (Ljubomir Đukić) (2:08)
2. "I've Got a Feeling" (Lennon/McCartney) (2:23)

== Personnel ==
- Srđan Gojković (guitar, vocals)
- Ljubomir Đukić (organ, piano, vocals)
- Marina Vulić (bass)
- Branko Kuštrin (drums)
- Ljubomir Jovanović (guitar)

== External links and references ==
- Sretno dijete at IMDb
- Konobar at Discogs
- EX YU ROCK enciklopedija 1960-2006, Janjatović Petar; ISBN 978-86-905317-1-4
