= Pasta ZZ =

Former Yugoslav new wave band

- Origin: Belgrade, Serbia, Yugoslavia
- Genres: New wave
- Years active: 1980 – 1982
- Labels: Jugoton, Falšanja Kol'ko'š Records, Pimpek Eliminator Records
- Past members: Branislav Petrović; Dragan Petrović; Dragoslav Radojković; Srđan Debeljković; Višeslav Orinčić; Đorđe Lukić

Pasta ZZ was a former Yugoslav new wave band from Belgrade, notable as participants in the Artistička Radna Akcija project in 1981.

== History ==
The band was formed by vocalist Đorđe "Rahaja" Lukić, guitarists Branislav "Banana" Petrović and Srđan Debeljković, bassist Višeslav Orinčić, and drummer Dragoslav Radojković. The only recordings the band released were two songs, "F.G. & Acreppy", written by Petrović and Lukić, and "Drakula" ("Dracula"), written by Petrović, released on the Artistička radna akcija (Artistic Work Action) compilation of various artists in 1981, featuring the second generation of the Belgrade new wave and punk rock bands.

After the release of the compilation, the band split up. Dragan Petrović joined the band Slomljena Stakla. Branislav Petrović joined Bezobrazno Zeleno and with them released their debut album BZ1. After the disbandment of Bezobrazno Zeleno, in 1985, he joined Električni Orgazam and has been a band member ever since. Throughout his career, he appeared as guest on numerous notable releases including the Partibrejkers debut and second album, playing harmonica, Ledeno doba (Ice Age) and Sloboda ili ništa (Freedom or Nothing) doing backing vocals, Srđan Gojković "Gile"'s solo album Evo sada vidiš da može (Now You See It Can) as guest guitarist and Disciplina Kičme's albums Svi za mnom! (Everybody, Follow Me!) and Kada kažeš muzika, na šta tačno misliš, reci mi? (When You Say Music, What Exactly Do You Mean, Tell Me?) doing backing vocals.

Radojković joined Kazimirov Kazneni Korpus, releasing their one and only split studio album, Kazimirov Kazneni Korpus / Profili Profili. He also performed with Laibach, appearing on their first studio album. In 1986, with Partibrejkers guitarist Nebojša Antonijević "Anton", former Urbana Gerila bassist Srđan Marković "Đile" and Profili Profili and Kazimirov Kazneni Korpus bassist and vocalist Miodrag "Čeza" Stojanović, he formed the band Plaćenici. The band appeared with four songs on the Beogradski grafiti (Belgrade Graffiti) compilation of various artists, and disbanded. In 2006, he appeared as guest drummer on Marković's band Supernaut's fourth studio album Eli.

In 2004, a live version of the band's song "Moje mladosti" ("My Youths") appeared on the Croatian compilation of various artists Tutti Pazzi Vol. 11.

== Legacy ==
In the SpongeBob SquarePants episode "Missing Identity" Patrick finds a record of the band Sting Ray 5000 in a dumpster. In a Serbian language version of the episode, the name of the band is translated as Pasta ZZ.

== Discography ==
- "FG & Acreppy" / "Drakula" (Artistička radna akcija, 1981)
- "Moje mladosti (Live)" (Tutti Pazzi Vol. 11, 2004)
