= Partibrejkers discography =

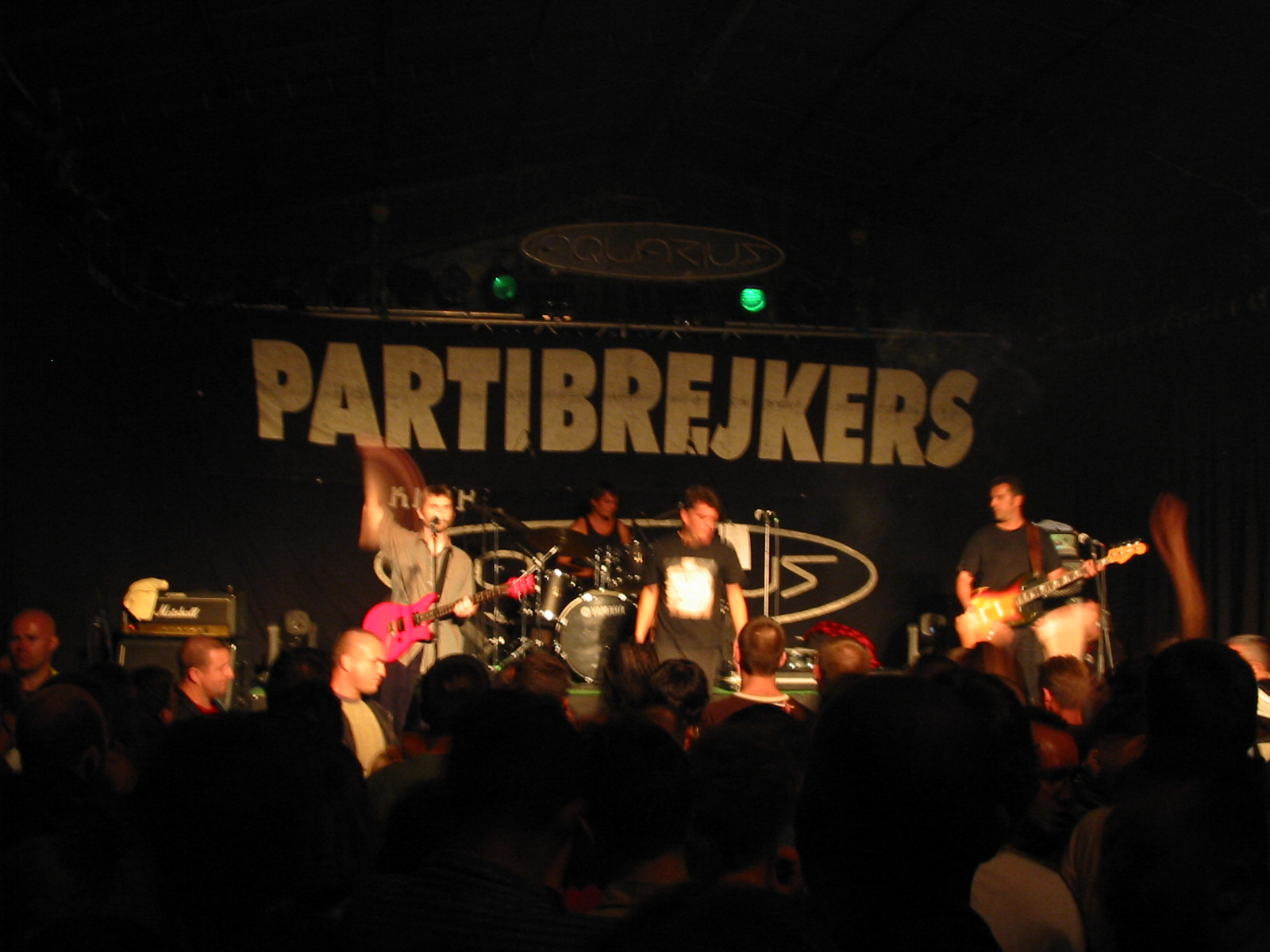
- Partibrejkers performing in 2003
- Studio albums: 7
- Live albums: 2
- Compilation albums: 2
- Singles: 1
- Other appearances: 6

The discography of the Serbian and former Yugoslav rock band Partibrejkers consists of seven studio albums, two live albums, two compilation albums, one single, one video album, and several various artists compilation appearances.

== Studio albums ==
Title	Released
Partibrejkers I	1985
Partibrejkers II	1988
Partibrejkers III	1989
Kiselo i slatko	1994
Ledeno doba	1997
Gramzivost i pohlepa	2002
Sloboda ili ništa	2007
Sirotinjsko carstvo	2015

== Live albums ==
Title	Released
Zabava još traje	1992
Krš i lom	2010

== Compilation albums ==
Title	Released
Najbolje od najgoreg	1996
San i java	1999

== Singles ==
Title	Released
"Hiljadu godina" / "Večeras"	1984

== Other appearances ==
Title	Released
"Radio Utopia"	1983
"What I'm Trying Now"	1996
"1000 godina"	1994
"Da li sam to ja / "Krug"	2000
"Koga ću da hvalim"	2001
"Zajedno"	2002

== Video albums ==
Title	Released
Poslednji dani slobode	1996
