= Profili Profili =

Band

- Profili Profili second and Kazimirov Kazneni Korpus first lineup

Background information
- Also known as: Kazimirov Kazneni Korpus, KKK
- Origin: Belgrade, Serbia, Yugoslavia
- Genres: New wave, post-punk, experimental music, minimal music, indie rock
- Years active: 1981 – 1984; 1987
- Labels: Jugoton, Galerija Srecna Nova Umetnost SKC
- Past members: Miodrag Stojanović; Slobodan Jeličić; Dragoslav Radojković; Milan Mladenović; Saša Radić

Profili Profili (Serbian Cyrillic: Профили Профили, trans: Profiles Profiles) was a Serbian and former Yugoslav new wave/experimental music duo from Belgrade, notable as the participant of the Artistička radna akcija project in 1981. During the same year the band members formed another band Kazimirov Kazneni Korpus (Serbian Cyrillic: Казимиров Казнени Корпус, trans: Casimir's Castigation Corps) and both bands appeared on their split album which is the first album in Yugoslavia to be released under an independent record label.

== History ==
=== Band formations ===
The band Profili Profili was formed by Miodrag "Čeza" Stojanović (bass, vocals) and Slobodan "Jela" Jeličić (guitar, vocals). Their two songs, "Majke ih guraju u metalnim korpama" ("Mothers Push Them In Metal Baskets") and "Nemir živaca" ("Nerve Unrest"), appeared on the Artistička radna akcija (Artistic Work Action) various artists compilation in 1981.

During the same year, Stojanović and Jeličić, with Dragoslav "Draža" Radojković, formed another band, Kazimirov Kazneni Korpus, half an hour before their first live appearance at Tašmajdan in Belgrade on the Aktuelna Beogradska Rock Scena festival. The band wrote one song during that time and played it in five different versions. The band made another live appearance, at Topčider, with the band Katarina II. At the time, the band was joined by Milan Mladenović, a former Šarlo Akrobata and Katarina II member as an additional bass guitarist.

=== Album recording, breakup ===
On 18 May 1982 the two bands performed at the Ljubljana band Laibach art exhibition, at the gallery of the Belgrade SKC. At the performance, the band made a decision to record the material they had been performing, and within the following three days, the band worked at the Banovo Brdo NGM studio. The album recording cost the band 15,000 Yugoslav dinars, which rated the album as a low-budget release, and was released under the independent record label Galerija Srecna nova umetnost SKC, making it the first independent music release in Yugoslavia.

Profili Profili in 1981 with Milan Mladenović

Kazimirov Kazneni Korpus / Profili Profili, released in March 1982, featured five versions of the Profili Profili song "Ventilatori" ("Ventilators"), and five versions of the Kazimirov Kazneni Korpus song "Paralitične šizoidne devojke" ("Paralitic Schizoid Girls"). Originally released in a hundred copies, with each copy having a different hand made art work album cover, soon after the release went out of print, and in the following month the band released a hundred more copies, which were quickly sold out. Today the album is considered a rarity and a collector's item.

In 1983, a version of Kazimirov Kazneni Korpus' "Paralitične šizoidne devojke" appeared on the Šećrna vodica (Sugar Drink) movie soundtrack, however, the soundtrack was never released as an official album. During the same year, Stojanović wanted to change the concept switching to guitar so that Kazimirov Kazneni Korpus had a vacant spot for a new bass player until Jeličić brought in Saša Radić as the new bassist, and Mladenović remained only the Profili Profili bassist. The two bands had rehearsed and did not perform live until the following year when they held their last live appearance at the Belgrade Akademija before Stojanović dissolved the bands.

=== Post-breakup ===
After the band disbandment, Jeličić stopped playing and performing, starting his own business company, and, in April 1996, died of cancer. Mladenović continued performing with Katarina II which, after the release of their self-titled album, changed the name to Ekatarina Velika, releasing six studio albums and achieving mainstream success. As Angel's Breath, with Mitar Subotić, he recorded and released an album called Angel's Breath, in the Spring of 1994 in Brazil, and in August it was discovered that he had pancreatic cancer. He died on 5 November 1994 in Belgrade.

Radojković continued performing with Laibach. Radojković with former bandmate from Profili Profili -KKK Miodrag Čeza Stojanović on a bass and Srđan Đile Marković bass player from Radnička kontrola on guitar and vocals formed the first line up of the band Plaćenici with idea to do a cover songs in 1986 but after one concert Radojković whose idea actually was to start Plaćenici leaves the band. Second line up of the band was with Nebojša Antonijević-Antun from Partibrejkers on guitar, Ivica Vdovic -Vd former Šarlo Akrobata drummer, and lead singer from Berliner Strasse then in band Burbon B Petar Ilić-Ćirilo alongside Stojanović and Marković playing Bo Didley songs and blues, as well as own material, but after few rehearsals Antun stayed in band with Stojanović and Marković and this two left the band to continue with their own projects but appearing as guests on some concerts In a solid line-up consisting of Miodrag Čeza Stojanović on a bass, Srdjan Djile Marković vocals and guitar, Nebojša Antonijević on guitar and Vlada Funtek on drums the band recorded six songs which appeared on the Beogradski grafiti - Bad Boy Rock, released by Kopar label Slovenija, but after a few live appearances, the band split up. With his wife, he formed the band Viet-Viet, later renamed to Ritual, and in 1989, with former Radnička Kontrola bass player Srđan "Đile" Marković and former Šarlo Akrobata and Katarina II drummer Ivan "VD" Vdović, formed the band DDT. In 1992, after Vdović's death, the band was renamed to Supernaut. With Supernaut, Stojanović released the studio album Budućnost sada, released in 1993, and the live album Live in Zombietown, released in 1995, before leaving the band. Live in Zombietown also featured Saša Radić who had joined the band and with Supernaut he has released four studio albums, Niže nego ljudski in 1998, Raj na nebu, pakao na Zemlji in 2000, Eli, on which Radojković appeared as guest drummer, in 2006, and Pobuna mašina in 2010.

== Discography ==
=== Studio albums ===
- Kazimirov Kazneni Korpus / Profili Profili (split album; 1982)

=== Other appearances ===
- "Majke ih guraju u metalnim kolicima" / Nemir živaca" (Artistička radna akcija; 1981)
