= Toni Montano =

Toni Montano Тони Монтано
- Also known as: Tonny Montano
- Born: Velibor Miljković; 1962; Bojnik, PR Serbia, FPR Yugoslavia
- Died: May 2024 (aged 62) Belgrade, Serbia
- Genres: Punk rock, rockabilly, psychobilly, rock
- Instrument: Vocals
- Years active: 1979–2024
- Labels: Hellidon, PGP-RTB, PGP-RTS, City Records

Velibor Miljković (Serbian Cyrillic: Велибор Миљковић; 1962 – 2024), better known by the stage name of Toni (Tonny) Montano (Serbian Cyrillic: Тони Монтано), was a Serbian rock musician.

== Biography ==
=== Radost Evrope ===
Miljković started his career as a vocalist of the band punk rock Radost Evrope (trans. Joy of Europe, not to be confused with a music festival of the same name), formed in 1979. The band lineup consisted of a large number of members, including Dime "Mune" Todorovski, later the member of Partibrejkers and Slobodan "Loka" Nešović, later the member of Urbana Gerila/Berliner Strasse and Defektno Efektni. They had rehearsals and performed at the Belgrade SKC, mainly cover versions of the Ramones songs, but also had their own material. The band did not leave any recordings, and performed until 1985, when they disbanded. However, part of the material performed by Radost Evrope appeared on Miljković's debut album. One of the last live appearances the band had as an opening act for the Angelic Upstarts, in April 1985. After the band disbanded, Miljković pursued a solo career.

=== Solo career ===
After the disbandment of Radost Evrope, Miljković named himself after the Scarface lead character Tony Montana. He released his debut album Tonny Montano in 1986. The album was produced by Buldožer member Borut Činč (who also played keyboards on the album) and combined punk rock and rockabilly, a combination Montano described as frkabili (fightabilly). The album featured songs "Vreme je da skinem mrak" ("It's Time that I Score for the First Time"), "Frigidna" ("Frigid", a cover of Sex Pistols song "Friggin' in the Riggin") and "Boli me zub" ("My Tooth Aches") previously performed with Radost Evrope. It also featured a cover versions of Dragan Stojnić's "Balada o Boni i Klajd" ("The Ballad of Bonnie and Clyde") and Bobby Freeman's "Do You Wanna Dance?". At the beginning, Montano's support band consisted of musicians who also chose pseudonyms after famous gangsters: Edi Salvatore (a former member of Radost Evrope, guitar), Manzanera (a former member of Partibrejkers, drums), Pjetro Manolo (bass guitarist), Serđo Manini (guitar), all of them at the same time members of the band Rock Street.

Toni Montano's next record Talični Tom je mrtav (Lucky Luke Is Dead), released in 1987, featured similar sound, and in 1988 he released the live album Live - mi smo iz Beograda (Mutant party) (Live - We're from Belgrade (Mutant Party)), which was not well received. At the time, Toni Montano and the band Đavoli from Split organized corporate Yugoslav tour. The album Lovac na novac (Money Hunter) was released in 1991 and featured a cover of Đorđe Marjanović's "Zvižduk u osam" ("Whistle at Eight O'Clock"), football chant "Mi smo šampioni" ("We Are the Champions") and song "Odlaziš 1984 - 1990" ("You Are Leaving 1984 - 1990") dedicated to the members of Prljavo Kazalište. Album featured members of Vampiri on backing vocals.

In 1993, Toni Montano acted in a stageplay Bilo jednom u Beogradu (Once Upon a Time in Belgrade) directed by himself and Miki Manojlović. Anent the stage play Toni Montano released the album of the same title. The song "Godfather" featured members of Orthodox Celts as guests. The album Najbolje od najboljeg 1991 - 1995 (Best of the Best 1991 - 1995) was released in 1995. The song "Mi smo srećna porodica" ("We're A Happy Family") featured Nele Karajlić on vocals. The album Moja žena fudbal ne voli! (Zašto?)" (My Wife Doesn't Like Football! (Why?)) featured rerecorded "Mi smo šampioni" and "Mi smo iz Beograda" and football chant "Obilić" recorded for FK Obilić. Compilation album Hajde, slušaj ovaj CD (Come on, Listen to This CD), released in 1999, featured a cover of Elvis J. Kurtović's song "Da bog da crk'o rock 'n' roll" ("I Hope Rock 'n' Roll Dies"). At the same time studio album Srećan rođendan (Happy Birthday) was released. The album featured members of Radijacija and Mega Bend, guitarist Nenad ″Nele″ Stamatović (former Bulevar member) and singer Sonja Mitrović "Hani". Srećan rođendan featured a cover version of Prljavo Kazalište song "Široke ulice" ("Wide Streets"). After the 2000 political changes in Serbia, Montano semi-retired from the scene.

In 2006, Montano released a compilation album Blue Eyes - Best of Tonny Montano, and, in 2007, the other called Lepšoj od najlepše (To the Prettiest of Them All), both released through City Records.

In 2012, Montano released the compilation album Istinita ljubavna priča - Jubilej - 25 godina muzičkog rada (True Love Story - Jubilee - 25 Years of Musical Work) through PGP-RTS. Following the release of the compilation album, Montano gathered a group of Belgrade-based musicians to form a touring band for a live performances comeback. The lineup features Eddie Salvatore (rhythm guitar), Santos Traficante (lead guitar), Vincenzo de Mora (bass guitar) and Emilio Horhas (drums). Montano and the band had their first performance on Belgrade Beer Fest on 14 August 2012.

== Film appearances ==
Toni Montano appeared in the movies Strangler vs. Strangler and Brod plovi za Šangaj.

== Legacy ==
In 2000, Serbian singer Viktorija covered Montano′s song "Svi se sada njišu" ("Now Everyone Is Swinging"), on her live cover album Nostalgija (Nostalgia).

== Death ==
Miljković was found dead in his apartment in Belgrade on 22 May 2024. Autopsy results are still pending.

== Discography ==
=== Studio albums ===
- Tonny Montano (1986)
- Talični Tom je mrtav (1987)
- Lovac na novac (1991)
- Bilo jednom u Beogradu (1994)
- Moja žena fudbal ne voli! (Zašto?) (1997)
- Srećan rođendan (1999)

=== Live albums ===
- Mutant Party Live! (Mi smo iz Beograda) (1988)

=== Compilations ===
- Najbolje od najboljeg 1986 - 1991 (1995)
- Najbolje od najboljeg 1991 - 1995 (1995)
- Hajde, slušaj ovaj CD (1999)
- Blue Eyes - Best of Tonny Montano (2006)
- Lepšoj od najlepše! (2007)
- Istinita ljubavna priča - Jubilej: 25 godina muzičkog rada 1986-2011 (2012)
- Neću da budem šljam - Jubilej: 37 godina muzičkog rada (2019)

=== Singles ===
- Perač prozora/Frigidna (1986)
- Talični Tom je mrtav/Banane (1987)
- Da bog da crk'o rock 'n' roll (1998)
