= Live in Zombietown =

Live album by Supernaut
- Released: 1995
- Recorded: September 7, 1995, BITEF theatre, Belgrade
- Genre: Alternative rock Industrial rock Indie rock Minimal music Experimental music
- Length: 37:06
- Label: Urbana Zona Trotorock
- Producer: Vladimir Janković "Slonče"

Supernaut chronology
| Budućnost sada (1993) | Live in Zombietown (1995) | Niže nego ljudski (1998) |

Live in Zombietown is the only live album by the Serbian alternative rock band Supernaut, recorded on September 7, 1995, at the Belgrade BITEF theatre, at the Zombietown movie premiere. The album, available on compact cassette only, was released by the independent record label Urbana Zona Trotorock, founded by the late underground painter Momir Grujić "Fleka". This is the first release to feature bassist Saša Radić and the last to feature Miodrag "Čeza" Stojanović on rhythm machine. Most of the material from the album appeared on the following studio album, the 1998 Niže nego ljudski (Lower than human). The track "Pobuna mašina" ("Machine rebellion") was rerecorded on the fifth studio album of the same name.

== Track listing ==
| No. | Title | Length |
|---|---|---|
| 1. | "Intro" | 0:45 |
| 2. | "Niže nego ljudski / LSDB / Pobuna mašina" (Lower than human / LSDB / Machine rebellion) | 13:05 |
| 3. | "Dželat" (The executioner) | 4:40 |
| 4. | "Ceremonija" (Ceremony) | 4:50 |
| 5. | "Sve" (Everything) | 3:00 |
| 6. | "Tata Rollingstone" (Papa Rollingstone) | 2:40 |
| 7. | "Ceremonija" (Cerenmony) | 8:20 |

== Personnel ==
=== Supernaut ===
- Saša Radić (bass)
- Čeza (Miodrag Stojanović; rhythm machine)
- Đile (Srđan Marković; vocals)

=== Additional personnel ===
- Vladimir Janković "Slonče" (sound engineer)
