= Supernaut (Serbian band) =

Serbian alternative rock band

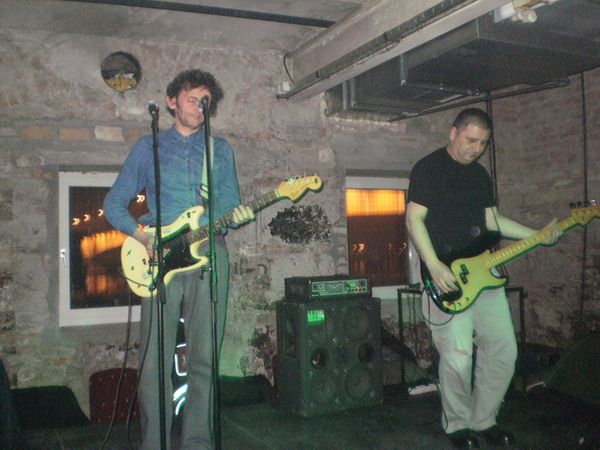
- Supernaut performing live in 2010: Srđan Marković (left) and Saša Radić (right)

Background information
- Also known as: DDT
- Origin: Belgrade, Serbia
- Genres: Alternative rock, industrial rock, minimal music, indie rock, art punk, post-punk revival, psychobilly, hard rock, garage rock
- Years active: 1989 – 1992; 1992 – present
- Labels: Zvona Records, Urbazona Trotorock, Supernaut Records, Beograund, Automatik Records
- Members: Srđan Marković; Saša Radić
- Past members: Aleksandra Arizanović; Dejana Jovanović; Ivan Vdović; Miodrag Stojanović; Svetolik Trifunović; Vlada Burić
- Website: Official Myspace page

Supernaut (Serbian Cyrillic: Супернаут) is a Serbian alternative rock band from Belgrade.

== History ==
=== 1990s ===
Having performed as DDT, formed in 1989 by former Šarlo Akrobata member Ivan Vdović "VD" (drums, rhythm machine), with Srđan Marković "Đile" (vocals) and Miodrag Stojanović "Čeza" (rhythm machine), the band changed the name to Supernaut, after Vdović's death in 1992. Influenced by the band Suicide, the rest of the band continued working in the same musical direction as on their previous efforts with DDT, explained by the band members as the "social art and its reflections on theatre, painting, film, and rock music". At the time, the band became a support for the Sonja Savić alternative theatre troupe, performing at various alternative theater festivals.

The debut studio album, Budućnost sada (The Future Now), released in 1993 by the independent record label Zvono Records, featured an experimental form of industrial rock, crossed with diverse musical influences, including the 1960s acid rock acts such as the 13th Floor Elevators. The album, available on compact cassette only, featuring the prominent tracks "Ja sam jedini" ("I Am The Only One") and "Čaj" ("Tea"), provided the band with the title "the most non-commercial band in Belgrade". The cover for the album was designed by Marković, which was also the case with all their later releases.

The next release was the Live in Zombietown, a live album released in 1995 and recorded at the BITEF theatre on September 7, 1995, during the Zombietown movie premier, in a new lineup, featuring the new bassist Saša Radić, who previously worked with Kazimirov Kazneni Korpus, presenting the band's minimalist music live intensity. The album was released by the independent record label Urbazona Trotorock, founded by the Belgrade underground painter Momir Grujić "Fleka", in collaboration with Radio B92 in 300 copies only, but free of copyright limitations, thus available for free copying and broadcasting. After the album release, Stojanović left the band.

On mid-1997, the band changed the lineup which, beside Marković (guitar, vocals) and Radić (bass), featured Svetolik Trifunović "Trile" (rhythm machine). Together, they recorded Niže nego ljudski (Less Than Human), recorded at the Triling studio during the Summer of 1997, and released in 1998. The album featured the band's first hit song "Tata Roll" ("Papa Roll"). Most of the tracks from the album already appeared on Live in Zombietown, however, the song arrangements were changed with the inclusion of Marković's guitar sections, moving towards psychobilly, blues and hard rock, making a fusion of rock & roll and electronic music. Having left the band, Trifunović formed the experimental music duo Tron, with the Presing frontman Zoran Radović "Kiza", performing improvised instrumental music.

=== 2000s ===
The new lineup, featuring backing vocalists Aleksandra Arizanović and Dejana Jovanović, recorded the album Raj na nebu, pakao na Zemlji (Heaven in the Sky, Hell on Earth), released by the independent record label Beograund in 2000. The album featured cover versions of the Kraftwerk single "Das Model", with lyrics in Serbian entitled "Model", for which a promotional video was recorded, and Dr. Feelgood song "Because You're Mine". The song "Superzao" ("Superevil"), which appeared on the album, was written and performed by Marković during the period with DDT. After the album release, the band went on hiatus, reactivating in 2005, in the lineup Srđan Marković (vocals, guitar, sequencing) and Saša Radić (bass, rhythm machine).

After a six-year discography break, the band recorded the album Eli (short for Eli Eli lama sabachthani, trans. My God, my God, why have you forsaken me?), released by Automatik Records in 2006. The album, featuring guest appearance by the former Urbana Gerila and Laibach drummer Dragoslav Radojković "Draža", included cover versions of Atomsko Sklonište song "Pakleni vozači" ("Hell Drivers"), The Stooges song "No Fun", and The Cramps' "Human Fly". The album appeared on the fifth place on the annual webzine Popboks list of the best albums released in 2006. Promotional videos were recorded for the tracks "Šifra" ("Password") and "Oh mili (Neupokojeni)" ("Oh, Dear Ones (The Undead)"), both directed by Joca Backulja. After the album release, the band lineup had included an additional guitar player, Vlada Burić, with whom the band appeared on the RTS 2 television show Bunt (Rebellion), and performed at the 2006 Jelen Pivo Live festival on December 16, 2006, however, the lineup did not last long and the band remained a duo.

In 2008, the band finished the recording sessions for the new studio album, with the working title Supernaut 6. Announcing the album, recorded at the Master Blaster studio, Marković stated that it was musically a followup of the previous two albums, but with more complex guitar arrangements and production. In order to retain an authentic sound, the material, written and arranged by Marković and Radić, featured a fifteen-year-old rhythm machine and twice as older guitar and bass guitar. Despite the announcement that Automatik Records was to release the album, the band was looking for a record label to release the new album for the following two years. Also, bassist Radić announced that the band was looking for the original tapes from the first three albums, available only on compact cassette, in order to rerelease them on CD.

=== 2010s ===
In April 2010, the band independently released the fifth studio album, Pobuna mašina (Rebellion of the Machines), thus completing the trilogy of albums which started with Raj na nebu, pakao na Zemlji and Eli. The album, consisting of ten songs, presented the band's final collaboration with the deceased producer Goran Živković, who also produced Budućnost sada and Eli. The album featured two previously released songs, "Đavo pod maskom" ("Devil in Disguise"), originally recorded and released in 1987 on the various artists compilation Beogradski grafiti - Bad Boy Rock (Belgrade Graffiti - Bad Boy Rock) by Marković with his former band Plaćenici, also featuring Partibrejkers guitarist Nebojša Antonijević "Anton" and Miodrag Stojanović "Čeza", and the title track, first released on Live in Zombietown, as well as the cover version of the Roky Erickson track "Nothing In Return", with lyrics in Serbian entitled "Ništa zauzvrat". After the album release, on July 18, 2010, the band performed on BELEF, the Belgrade Summer festival.

The following year, on January 28, Pobuna mašina appeared on the 13th place of the Popboks list for the best domestic album in 2010. The following month, the critics of Popboks made a list of the best domestic albums released in the previous decade on which the album Eli appeared on the 41st place. At the time, Vujičić Kolekcija released the monograph Niže nego ljudski: Srđan Đile Marković i andergraund figuracija (Less Than Human: Srđan Đile Marković and the Underground Figuration) by Nikola Dedić, featuring Marković's works from 1987 until 2011, promoted with an exhibition of Marković's works as well as the projection of the film Superstvarnost (Superreality), recorded by Supernaut and Sonja Savić, and Supernaut music videos. In May of the same year, at the Belgrade Mixer festival, the Serbian alternative rock band Neočekivana Sila Koja Se Iznenada Pojavljuje i Rešava Stvar performed the album Live in Zombietown in its entirety, with the whole performance being broadcast on Radio B92.

== Theater and film activities ==
With the actress Sonja Savić, the band worked on the theater pieces Ubistvo na ivici grada (A Murder on the Edge of Town), Superstvarnost (Superreality) and Play, for the former two the band recorded alternative film versions, directed by Sonja Savić. The latter two were turned into films, Superstvarnost, a 55-minute film, dealing with 300,000 intellectuals who had left Yugoslavia in order avoid the Yugoslav wars, and Play, a computer-animated movie featuring Marković's animations, dealing with the 1997 student protests in Belgrade.

Beside the two films, the troupe appeared in a musical semi-documentary Filmska akademija SuperNaut-BelgradeUnderground (The SuperNaut-BelgradeUnderground Movie Academy). The film soundtracks were entirely recorded by the band themselves. The three plays were also presented to the London audience at the Tate Gallery. After the performance of the piece Play, in 1997, the band stopped collaborating with Sonja Savić.

In March 1996, the band participated the International Alternative Theatre Festival FIAT, and the following year, at the Novi Sad Spens Sports Center organized the Veče Supernauta (A Supernaut Evening), which featured a rock concert, a theater play, and an art exhibition. During the same year, the band appeared as performers in the film Geto (Ghetto), starring the Električni Orgazam drummer Goran Čavajda "Čavke". They also wrote the plays Masovna narkomanija (Massive Drug Addiction), Superstvarnost II (Kosmogonija) (Superreality II (Cosmogony)), and Pobuna mašina (Rebellion of the Machines), the later being co-written with the painter Miomir Grujić "Fleka".

== Discography ==
=== Studio albums ===
- Budućnost sada (1993)
- Niže nego ljudski (1998)
- Raj na nebu, pakao na Zemlji (2000)
- Eli (2006)
- Pobuna mašina (2010)

=== Live albums ===
- Live in Zombietown (1995)

== Videography ==
- Filmska akademija SuperNaut BelgradeUnderground (1995)
- Superstvarnost (1996)
- Geto (1996)
- Play (1997)

== Bibliography ==
- EX YU ROCK enciklopedija 1960-2006, Janjatović Petar; ISBN 978-86-905317-1-4
