= Artistička radna akcija =

1981 compilation album by various artists

Compilation album by Various artists
- Released: 1981
- Recorded: April–May 1981; Druga Maca studio, Belgrade
- Genre: New wave, punk rock, ska
- Length: 50:27
- Label: Jugoton
- Producer: Enco Lesić

Artistička radna akcija (meaning: "Artistic Work Action", also known under the acronym: ARA) is a new wave and punk rock compilation album released in 1981 by Jugoton in SFR Yugoslavia. It presents a snapshot of the early 1980s Belgrade underground music scene through bands Radnička Kontrola, Bezobrazno Zeleno, Profili Profili, Defektno Efektni, Urbana Gerila, Petar i Zli Vuci, U Škripcu, Pasta ZZ, VIA Talas and TV Moroni, all of whom took part in the compilation as means of showcasing their material to a wider audience.

== Background ==
The album was released by Jugoton as a followup to the hugely successful Paket aranžman that presented three Belgrade bands (Idoli, Šarlo Akrobata and Električni Orgazam), which, after the compilation release, quickly gained mainstream popularity. Still, despite employing a similar concept, Artistička radna akcija never managed to replicate the critical and commercial success of its predecessor. The compilation was recorded at Druga Maca studio during April and May 1981 and, like Paket aranžman, was also produced by Enco Lesić. Dušan Vasiljević was among the engineers.

The compilation featured the U Škripcu tracks surf Spaghetti Western "Pamflex dom" and ska / reggae oriented "Južno voće", which became minor hits, along with Bezobrazno Zeleno tracks "Bežim niz ulicu" and "Beograd", and the seven piece band Petar i Zli Vuci tracks "Ogledalo" and "Kozaci", which were also released on single. The former appeared on the B92 list of 100 Greatest Yugoslav rock songs in 2006, ranked in the 90th place. The VIA Talas track "Lilihip" is a cover version of the Millie Small song "My Boy Lollipop".

Half of the bands did not release any other recordings except the ones on this compilation. Bezobrazno Zeleno released two studio albums, Profili Profili released a split album with Kazimirov Kazneni Korpus, Petar i Zli Vuci released two singles, U Škripcu had several studio releases and gained mainstream popularity moving to synthpop, and VIA Talas released one studio album before disbanding in 1982. Unlike Paket aranžman, which featured three young acts that almost immediately became critically acclaimed, even commercially successful, each one of the ten bands on Artistička radna akcija (with the exception of U Škripcu) remained largely obscure.

Still, many of the individuals who took part in Artistička radna akcija found success in other bands, other forms of artistic expression or other professions altogether, such as:

- Radnička Kontrola members: vocalist Zoran "Cane" Kostić who formed the popular garage punk band Partibrejkers, and drummer Srđan Todorović who later played with Disciplina Kičme, Ekatarina Velika and Kazna Za Uši, and in parallel started a successful acting career
- VIA Talas members: Bojan Pečar who joined Ekatarina Velika and Miško "Plavi" Petrović who joined the popular synthpop duo D' Boys
- Urbana Gerila members: Nenad "Kele" Krasavac who joined Disciplina Kičme, Branislav "Kebra" Babić who formed the alternative rock band Obojeni Program. Also Branko Rosić, later to become a journalist, and Vladimir Arsenijević, later to become awarded and internationally acclaimed writer-novelist as well as co-founder and editor of the magazine Rende, and Slobodan "Loka" Nešović, later founder of Automatik Records company.

In the years since its release, Artistička radna akcija has managed to gain some slightly wider recognition as a referential work that endeared itself to many, and, along with Novi Punk Val and Paket aranžman, is considered an important symbol of the Yugoslav new wave era and the former Yugoslav punk scene. The record today is a rarity and a collector's item and has a cult status in the countries that emerged after the breakup of Yugoslavia. The album was re-released on CD in July 2014.

== Track listing ==
1. Radnička Kontrola - "Dosada" (3:50)
2. Radnička Kontrola - "TV u koloru" (1:45)
3. Bezobrazno Zeleno - "Bežim niz ulicu" (2:27)
4. Bezobrazno Zeleno - "Beograd" (2:05)
5. Profili Profili - "Majke ih guraju u metalnim kolicima" (2:55)
6. Profili Profili - "Nemir živaca" (3:25)
7. Defektno Efektni - "A" (3:00)
8. Defektno Efektni - "D" (2:00)
9. Urbana Gerila - "Proces" (2:05)
10. Urbana Gerila - "Bez naslova" (1:45)
11. Petar i Zli Vuci - "Ogledalo" (3:28)
12. Petar i Zli Vuci - "Kozaci" (2:20)
13. U Škripcu - "Pamflex dom" (2:20)
14. U Škripcu - "Južno voće" (2:07)
15. Pasta ZZ - "FG & Acreppy" (3:20)
16. Pasta ZZ - "Drakula" (2:07)
17. VIA Talas - "Hawaii (Najlepši kraj)" (2:00)
18. VIA Talas - "Lilihip (My Boy Lollipop)" (2:00)
19. TV Moroni - "Moja borba" (2:05)
20. TV Moroni - "Pada noć" (2:25)

== See also ==
- New wave music in Yugoslavia
- Punk rock in Yugoslavia
- Serbian rock
