= Zoran Kostić =

Zoran Kostić may refer to:

- Zoran Kostić (musician) (born 1964), Serbian punk rock musician
- Zoran Kostić (footballer) (born 1982), Serbian football player
