= Lidija Seničar =

Serbian art historian, curator and essayist

- Born: October 19, 1973 (age 53); Belgrade, Serbia, SFR Yugoslavia
- Education: University of Belgrade Faculty of Philosophy
- Occupations: Serbian art historian, curator and essayist

Lidija Seničar (née Lazović; Belgrade, October 19, 1973) is a Serbian art historian, curator, selector and cultural activist, known for her activities on field of children and youth creativity.

She is the editor-in-chief of the visual art programs of the Children's Cultural Center of Belgrade, where she also manages the International art contest "Joy of Europe". She is the author of the Belgrade Research archive for children's creativity "Growing Up" /Serbian: Izrastanje/ and others projects.

== Biography ==
=== Education ===
In Belgrade she completed elementary school and the cultural-linguistic Twelfth Gymnasium, department for foreign correspondent. She graduated in 1999 at the University of Belgrade Faculty of Philosophy, at the Department of Art History / Subdepartment of National History of Art of the New Century, with the theme "Coronation of the Virgin as an Iconographic Theme in Serbian Baroque Painting", summa cum laude.

She attended museology seminars organized by the Ministry of Culture and Information of Serbia. She gained the title of the state curator in 2006.

=== Career ===
She wrote about the contemporary art scene in Belgrade in Express Politika daily (2001–2002). In 2004, she worked for the FIA art group as a museum tours coordinator and co-organizer of the "Publikum Calendar 2005 Phenomenon: karlssonwilker" project

She was employed as a curatorial intern in 2005 at the state Museum of Applied Arts in Belgrade, in the Public relations department and as an associate of the Education department.

With her fellow curators from Belgrade museums — National Museum, Ethnographic Museum, Natural History Museum, Museum of Yugoslavia... — she founded in 2006 "Center – CENTAR", a non-profit social organization dedicated to bringing cultural content to people with disabilities and presenting their creativity to make culture accessible to all. Many notable workshops and exhibitions were realized.

She was employed at the Children's Cultural Center of Belgrade in 2010 as editor-in-chief of the Gallery, where she designs and implements the Gallery's exhibition and educational program (about 25 exhibitions per year), promoting children's artistic creation and bringing art to children and young people. She has been the editor of the art programs of the Children's Cultural Center of Belgrade since 2012.

Her editorial engagement also includes projects such as the International Art Contest "Joy of Europe" /Radost Evrope/; "Worlds and Heroes" /Svetovi i junaci/ – dedicated to Serbian puppetry and theater for children; "Your Magical World" /Tvoj čarobni svet/ with the Goethe Institute; Competition for the Bogomil Karlavris Award for distinguished results and special contribution in the field of art education and education of children and youth; "Wisdom of the senses — children's visual arts" /Mudrost čula – dečje likovno stvaralaštvo/, an exhibition of students of the Faculty of Fine Arts and Faculty of Applied Arts and Design in Belgrade, within the subject Teaching methods of fine arts (methodical practice in preschools, primary and secondary schools – vocational schools, gymnasiums and art schools, schools for children with disabilities, homes for children without parental care); Traditional panels "Fine Arts Pedagogy — Current Issues, Dilemmas and Perspectives" /Likovna pedagogija – aktuelna pitanja, dileme i perspektive/; project "Lego — a contemporary toy" /Lego – savremena igračka/ etc.

She is a reviewer of the textbooks of fine arts for the primary school. She is also an associate of the Museum of Applied Arts in Belgrade within the Children's October Salon.

=== Author projects (choice) ===
- "Growing Up" /Izrastanje/, a research project concerning visual sensibilities of adults and artistically formed persons from an early age, on the principle that early childhood art culture is necessary for personality formation (since 2011; annual exhibitions and symposiums);
- International comic strip competition (since 2011; annually);
- Children's creativity research archive (2015);
- "From the ancient temple to a man of new individuality – The history of civilization through the visual dictionary of modern age" (2016)
