= Kiselo i slatko =

Studio album by Partibrejkers
- Released: 1994
- Recorded: August–September 1989, 1992 O studio, Belgrade; May - December 1993, PGP RTS studios 5 and 6, Belgrade
- Genre: Garage rock; punk rock; blues rock
- Length: 34:39
- Label: PGP RTB; 211959
- Producer: Partibrejkers, Vlada Negovanović

Partibrejkers chronology
Partibrejkers III (1989)	Kiselo i slatko (1994)	Ledeno doba (1997)

Professional ratings
Review scores
Source	Rating
Ritam	5/5 stars

Kiselo i slatko is the fourth studio album by the Serbian garage rock/punk rock band Partibrejkers, released by PGP RTB in 1994.

== Track listing ==
All tracks written by Zoran Kostić and Nebojša Antonijević, except track 6 written by Milan Mladenović and track 7 written by Dime Todorov.

No.	Title	Length
1.	"Ja hoću da te volim (Kako)" (I Want To Love You (How))	4:09
2.	"Hoću da Znam" (I Want To Know)	3:49
3.	"Ljudi nisu isti" (People Are Not The Same)	2:54
4.	"Javi se" (Call Me)	4:18
5.	"Molitva" (A Prayer)	5:36
6.	"Daleko od očiju" (Away From The Eyes)	5:51
7.	"Ja sam doktor" (I Am A Doctor)	2:29
8.	"Težak zaborav" (Heavy Oblivion)	6:42
9.	"Ona je prokleta" (She is Cursed)	3:02
10.	"Ti si moja sreća" (You Are My Happiness)	3:33

== Personnel ==
Partibrejkers

- Nebojša Antonijević "Anton" — guitar
- Zoran Kostić "Cane" — vocals

Additional personnel

- Vlada Negovanović — acoustic guitar, producer
- Branka Katić — backing vocals
- Srđan Gojković "Gile" — backing vocals
- Saša Vlajsović — bass
- Zoran Radomirović "Švaba" — bass
- Srđan Todorović — drums
- "Pera Joe" Miladinović — harmonica
- Saša Lokner — keyboards,
- Goran Čavajda "Čavke" — percussion, backing vocals
- Borko Petrović — percussion, backing vocals
- Marin Petrić "Puroni" — percussion, backing vocals
- Milan Mladenović — vocals, harmonica
- Nenad Petrović — saxophone
- Aleksandar Kujučev — photography
- Zoran Marić — engineer
- Slavimir Stojanović — artwork by [design]
- Dušan Ercegovac — executive producer
