= Banana (band) =

- Banana in 1988

Background information
- Origin: Belgrade, SR Serbia, SFR Yugoslavia
- Genres: Pop rock; power pop
- Years active: 1985-1988
- Label: PGP-RTB
- Past members: Aleksandra Toković; Boban Šaranović; Dragan Lončar; Srđan Cincar; Igor Borojević

Banana (Serbian Cyrillic: Банана) was a Yugoslav pop rock band formed in Belgrade in 1985. They were a prominent act of the 1980s Yugoslav rock scene.

== Band history ==
=== 1985-1988 ===
Banana was formed in 1985. Initially the band went through numerous lineup changes, before a steady lineup was formed: Aleksandra Toković (daughter of the well-known folk music composer Dragan Toković, vocals), Dragan Lončar (guitar), Boban Šaranović (bass guitar), Srđan Cincar (keyboards) and Igor Borojević (drums). They released their debut album Ponoćni pasaži (Midnight Sections) in 1986. The album was pop rock-oriented, and featured guest appearances by guitarist Duda Bezuha, Bajaga i Instruktori keyboardist Saša Lokner and former Zamba vocalist and bass guitarist Bogdan Dragović. The songs were authored by Šaranović, Cincar, Bezuha, Dragović and Heroji member Vladimir Đurić.

In the summer of 1987, the band toured Czechoslovakia, headlining a festival in Prague. At the beginning of 1988, they released their second album, Banana‚ produced by keyboardist Đorđe Petrović, who, at the time, performed with the band. Aleksandra Toković wrote seven songs which marked the band's shift towards power pop. Soon after the release of their second album, Banana disbanded.

=== Post breakup ===
Borojević moved to Partibrejkers, and later started working as a music producer, producing the albums by Bjesovi, Piloti, Dža ili Bu, Kristali, Partibrejkers and other acts. Aleksandra Toković became a television presenter at Radio Television of Serbia. Srđan Cincar performed with the band Grof (Count). With the band, he recorded the album Na tvojim rukama (In Your Arms), released in 1991. Simultaneously, he led the band Fantomi (The Phantoms).

== Discography ==
- Ponoćni pasaži (1986)
- Banana (1988)
