= Defektno Efektni =

Serbian new wave/punk rock band

- Origin: Belgrade, Serbia
- Genres: New wave, punk rock, power pop, garage rock
- Years active: 1980 – 1982
- Label: Jugoton
- Past members: Branko Petrović; Dejan Ignjatović; Slobodan Nešović

Defektno Efektni (Serbian Cyrillic: Дефектно Ефектни; trans. Defective-Effective) was a Serbian new wave/punk rock band from Belgrade, notable as the participant of the Artistička Radna Akcija project in 1981.

== History ==
The band was formed by Urbana Gerila 13-year-old guitarist Slobodan Nešović "Loka", with the bassist Branko Petrović "Bane" and drummer Dejan Ignjatović. The band had only four songs written and two of them, "A" and "D" appeared on the Artistička Radna Akcija compilation featuring the second generation of new wave and punk rock bands in Belgrade. The reason why they gave the song titles with alphabet letters was because they did not like the names they came up for the tracks. In an interview, Nešović stated that he was not satisfied with the recordings due to the band's inexperience in the studio. In the meantime, the band had made several appearances at the Petkom u 22 (Friday at 22) television show.

After the release of Artistička Radna Akcija the band split up and Nešović formed the band Berliner Strasse with his former bandmates from Urbana Gerila. He was also the member of Radost Evrope (which later evolved to Toni Montano and his backing band), and San Vila, which was influenced by Paul Weller's works, but lasted for a short period of time (1986–1987). He was also working in studio and played a guitar on a few concerts with his former bandmate from Berliner Strasse Petar Ilić "Cirilo" in a short lived band Bourbon B. He worked as a B92 host from 1989 until 1992. He was also a TV host on the NTV Studio B for the Videodrom show, which was the first independent musical TV show and as a DJ, organizing Acid-House parties in Belgrade. During wartime he emigrated and founded the Red Luna Records and in 1996 he returned to Belgrade and formed Automatik Records. Ignjatović later joined the band Aja Sofia and Branko Petrović stopped performing.

The song "A" appeared on the Serbian bootleg record label Cheerokie Sound various artists compilation Yugoslavia punk 1977-1991.

== Legacy ==
The song "D" was covered by the Croatian band Falkofbolan on their 1998 album Jedini dokaz. They renamed the song "Sarajevo".

== Discography ==
Title	Released
"A" / "D"	1981

== See also ==
- New wave music in Yugoslavia
- Punk rock in Yugoslavia
