= Partibrejkers III =

Studio album by Partibrejkers
- Released: 1989
- Recorded: August–September 1989, O studio, Belgrade
- Genre: Garage rock; punk rock; blues rock
- Length: 28:46
- Label: Jugodisk; LPD-0509
- Producer: Milan Ćirić

Partibrejkers chronology
Partibrejkers II (1988)	Partibrejkers III (1989)	Kiselo i slatko (1994)

Professional ratings
Review scores
Source	Rating
Ritam	5/5 stars

Partibrejkers III is the third studio album by the Serbian garage rock/punk rock band Partibrejkers, released by Jugodisk in 1989.

== Track listing ==
All tracks written by Zoran Kostić and Nebojša Antonijević.

No.	Title	Length
1.	"Kreni prema meni" (Go Towards Me)	2:35
2.	"Sunca sin" (Son of the Sun)	2:00
3.	"Zemljotres" (Earthquake)	3:00
4.	"Ona sve zna" (She Knows Everything)	3:38
5.	"Najbolje se putuje" (The Best Way To Travel)	2:22
6.	"Ono što pokušavam" (What I Am Attempting)	3:16
7.	"Hipnotisana gomila" (Hypnotized Crowd)	2:21
8.	"Daleko od srca" (Away From The Heart)	3:50
9.	"Ja radim teško" (I'm working hard)	2:47
10.	"Reći ću ti" (I Will Tell You)	2:57

== Personnel ==
Partibrejkers

- Nebojša Antonijević "Anton" — guitar
- Zoran Kostić "Cane" — vocals
- Igor Borojević — drums, recorded by
- Dime Todorov "Mune" — bass

Additional personnel

- Milan Ćirić — producer
- Vlada Negovanović — mixed by
- Petar Miladinović "Pera Joey" — harmonica
- Srđan Marković — artwork by [cover]
- Goran Nikolašević — photography
