= Zabava još traje =

Live album by Partibrejkers
- Released: 1992
- Recorded: Summer 1991 tour, studio recordings from 1989
- Genre: Garage rock Punk rock Rock
- Length: 60:38
- Label: Sorabia Disk
- Producer: Igor Borojević

Partibrejkers live chronology
Zabava još traje (1992)	Krš i lom (2010)

Professional ratings
Review scores
Source	Rating
Ritam	5/5 stars

Zabava još traje is the first live album by the Serbian garage rock/punk rock band Partibrejkers, released by Sorabia Disk in 1992.

== Track listing ==
No.	Title	Length
1.	"Tkiva" (Tissues)	2:19
2.	"Zemljotres" (Earthquake)	2:47
3.	"Pet ispod nule" (Five Below Zero)	2:23
4.	"Noć" (The Night)	2:37
5.	"Ono što pokušavam" (What I am Attempting)	3:11
6.	"Hipnotisana gomila" (Hypnotized Crowd)	2:26
7.	"Ona živi na brdu" (She Lives On The Hill)	2:24
8.	"Sunca Sin" (Son of the Sun)	1:51
9.	"Ona sve zna" (She Knows Everything)	3:15
10.	"Večeras" (Tonight)	3:14
11.	"Put" (The Road)	3:59
12.	"Hiljadu godina" (A Thousand Years)	5:28
13.	"Kreni prema meni" (Move Towards Me)	2:40
14.	"Prsten" (A Ring)	3:14
15.	"Stoj Džoni" (Stop Johnny)	4:20
16.	"Ulični hodač" (Street Walker)	6:05
17.	"Svako ima pravo na mir (studio track)" (Everybody Has The Right To Peace)	3:40
18.	"Veliki svet (studio track)" (The Great World)	4:06

== Personnel ==
Partibrejkers

- Nebojša Antonijević "Anton" — guitar
- Zoran Kostić "Cane" — vocals
- Borko Petrović — drums
- Dime Todorov "Mune" — bass guitar

Additional personnel

- Igor Borojević — photography
- K.a.m.e.n.k.o. — engineer
