= Krš i lom =

Live album by Partibrejkers
- Released: 2010
- Recorded: March 20 and 21, 2009; Dom Omladine, Belgrade
- Genre: Garage rock Punk rock Rock
- Length: 59:21
- Label: Odličan Hrčak; CD 016
- Producer: Sale Janković

Partibrejkers live chronology
Zabava još traje (1992)	Krš i lom (2010)

Professional ratings
Review scores
Source	Rating
Muzika.hr	4/5 stars

Krš i lom is the second live album by the Serbian garage rock/punk rock band Partibrejkers, released by Odličan Hrčak in 2010. The album was also released for free digital download through the Exit Music record label.

== Track listing ==
All tracks written by Nebojša Antonijević "Anton" and Zoran Kostić "Cane".

No.	Title	Length
1.	"Noć" (The Night)	2:41
2.	"Ako si" (If You Are)	2:08
3.	"Lobotomija" (Lobotomy)	2:44
4.	"Ćutanje" (Silence)	2:41
5.	"Žurim" (I Am In A Hurry)	2:42
6.	"Put" (The Road)	6:27
7.	"Hiljadu godina" (A Thousand Years)	7:22
8.	"Noćas u gradu" (Tonight in the Town)	4:25
9.	"Kreni prema meni" (Go Towards Me)	2:47
10.	"Hipnotisana gomila" (Hypnotized crowd)	2:21
11.	"Hoću da znam" (I Want To Know)	4:09
12.	"Ulični hodač" (Street Walker)	12:51
13.	"Ona živi na brdu" (She Lives On The Hill)	2:29
14.	"Stoj Džoni" (Stop Johnny)	4:10

== Personnel ==
Partibrejkers

- Nebojša Antonijević "Anton" — guitar
- Zoran Kostić "Cane" — vocals
- Darko Kurjak — drums
- Zlatko Veljović "Laki" — bass guitar

Additional personnel

- Sale Janković — producer
- Milan Barković "Bare" — recorded by
- Igor Borojević — sound technician
- Iva Rakić — design
- Aleksandar Polzović "Zvono — photography
- Branko Galičić — photography
- Stanislav Milojković — photography
