= TV Moroni =

- TV Moroni performing in 1981 - left to right: Aleksandar Aleksandrić, Mićo Uzelac, and Aleksandar Đukić.

Background information
- Origin: Belgrade, Serbia, Yugoslavia
- Genres: New wave, punk rock
- Years active: 1981 – 1983
- Label: Jugoton
- Past members: Aleksandar Aleksandrić; Aleksandar Đukić; Goran Nikolić; Mićo Uzelac; Srđan Dragojević; Zoran Cerar; Zoran Janković

TV Moroni (Serbian Cyrillic: ТВ Морони; trans. TV Morons) was a Serbian new wave/punk rock band from Belgrade, notable as the participant of the Artistička radna akcija project in 1981.

== History ==
The band consisted of Zoran Cerar (vocals), Aleksandar Aleksandrić (lead guitar), Aleksandar Đukić (rhythm guitar), Zoran Janković (bass) and Mićo Uzelac (drums). Other band members were Srđan Dragojević, and Goran Nikolić, but they did not record anything with the band.

TV Moroni's two songs, "Moja borba" ("My Struggle") and "Pada noć" ("The Night Is Falling"), were the closing tracks of the "Artistička radna akcija" (Artistic Work Action) various artist compilation, featuring the second generation of the Belgrade new wave and punk rock bands. The band also appeared on the first Ventilator Demo Top 10 show in February 1983 with the song "Tebi dajem sve" ("I Give Everything to You"), but it was never released. After the compilation release, the band disbanded.

After the band's disbandment, Aleksadar Đukić formed the band Nesalomivi in September 1986, and despite having their single "Ja imam ideju" ("I Have an Idea"), a song from the TV Moroni period written by Zoran Cerar and Aleksadar Đukić, released on the ZKP RTLJ compilation 101 otkucaj u ritmu srca vol. 1 and a significant airplay on the Yugoslav radio stations, record labels did not show much interest for the band and in 1989 they disbanded. In 2008, the band reunited and recorded the album Isti onaj dečak (That Same Boy), released by Dallas Records in 2010.

Srđan Dragojević became a famous movie director and screenplay writer. His greatest success was the 1992 movie Mi nismo anđeli and his other notable movies are Lepa sela, lepo gore, Dva sata kvalitetnog TV programa and Rane. In 1993, he appeared as the author of the Vampiri song "Be-Be", which appeared on the Mi nismo anđeli soundtrack. Goran Nikolić played in several bands, including, Džambasovi and Neočekivana Sila Koja Se Iznenada Pojavljuje i Rešava Stvar.

== Legacy ==
The "Moja borba" lyrics were featured in Petar Janjatović's book Pesme bratstva, detinjstva & potomstva: Antologija ex YU rok poezije 1967 - 2007 (Songs of Brotherhood, Childhood & Offspring: Anthology of Ex YU Rock Poetry 1967 - 2007).

In the Srđan Dragojević's movie Mi nismo anđeli 3 the main character, Marko, is the frontman of the band called TV Moroni, performing a cover version of Animatori hit single "Anđeli nas zovu da im skinemo krila".

== Discography ==
Title	Released
"Moja borba" / "Pada noć"	1981
