= Kazimirov Kazneni Korpus / Profili Profili =

- One of the covers for the album

Studio album by Kazimirov Kazneni Korpus and Profili Profili
- Released: March 1982
- Recorded: March 1982, NGM studio, Banovo Brdo, Belgrade
- Genre: New wave, post-punk, experimental, minimal, indie rock
- Length: 38:24
- Label: Galerija Srecna nova umetnost SKC

Kazimirov Kazneni Korpus and Profili Profili chronology
Artistička radna akcija (1981)	Kazimirov Kazneni Korpus / Profili Profili (1982)

Kazimirov kazneni korpus / Profili profili is the first and only studio release by the Serbian minimalist / experimental music bands Profili Profili and Kazimirov Kazneni Korpus, recorded and released in March 1982. This split album, released by Galerija Srecna nova umetnost SKC, is the first former Yugoslav album, released under an independent record label.

== Background ==
During early 1982, the two bands featuring the same lineup, Profili Profili and Kazimirov Kazneni Korpus, performed at the Ljubljana band Laibach art exhibition, at the gallery of the Belgrade SKC. At the performance, the band made a decision to record the material they have been performing, and within the following three days, the band worked at the Banovo Brdo NGM studio. The album recording cost the band 15.000 Yugoslav dinars, which was rated the album a low-budget release, and was released under the independent record label Galerija Srecna nova umetnost SKC, making it the first independent music release in Yugoslavia. Kazimirov Kazneni Korpus / Profili Profili, released in March 1982, featured five versions of the Profili Profili song "Ventilatori" ("Ventilators"), and five versions of the Kazimirov Kazneni Korpus song "Paranoidno šizoidne devojke" ("Paranoid schizophrenic girls"). Originally released in a hundred copies, with each copy having a different album cover, soon after the release went out of print, and in the following month the band released a hundred more copies, which were quickly sold out. Today the album is considered a rarity and a collector's item.

== Track listing ==
=== Kazimirov Kazneni Korpus (side A) ===
No.	Title	Length
1.	"Paraliticno šizoidne devojke I" (Paranoid schizophrenic girls I)	3:22
2.	"Paraliticno šizoidne devojke II" (Paranoid schizophrenic girls II)	3:19
3.	"Paraliticno šizoidne devojke III" (Paranoid schizophrenic girls III)	3:18
4.	"Paraliticno šizoidne devojke IV" (Paranoid schizophrenic girls IV)	3:23
5.	"Paraliticno šizoidne devojke V" (Paranoid schizophrenic girls V)	3:22

=== Profili Profili (side B) ===
No.	Title	Length
1.	"Ventilatori I" (Ventilators I)	3:35
2.	"Ventilatori II" (Ventilators II)	4:30
3.	"Ventilatori III" (Ventilators III)	4:37
4.	"Ventilatori IV" (Ventilators IV)	3:38
5.	"Ventilatori V" (Ventilators V)	5:20

== Personnel ==
- Miodrag "Čeza" Stojanović (bass guitar, vocals)
- Slobodan "Jela" Jeličić (guitar, vocals)
- Dragoslav "Draža" Radojković (drums)
- Milan Mladenović (bass guitar)
