= Budućnost sada =

Studio album by Supernaut
- Released: 1993
- Genres: Alternative rock Industrial rock Indie rock Minimal music Experimental music
- Length: 31:04
- Labels: Zvono Records; C 002
- Producer: Supernaut

Supernaut chronology
Budućnost sada (1993)	Niže nego ljudski (1998)

Budućnost sada (The Future Now) is the debut album by the Serbian alternative rock band Supernaut, released by Zvono Records in 1993. The cover for the album, available only on compact cassette, was designed by Srđan Marković "Đile". After the album release, the band got the epithet "the most non-commercial band in Belgrade". In 2009, the band bassist Saša Radić announced that the band was looking for the original tapes of the band first releases, including Budućnost sada, in order to rerelease them on CD.

== Track listing ==
Produced, composed & arranged by Supernaut.

No.	Title	Length
1.	"Aljaska" (Alaska)	4:07
2.	"Bluz Za Džini" (Blues For Jeanne)	3:25
3.	"Majka" (Mother)	3:24
4.	"Sećanje" (Memory)	2:04
5.	"Čaj" (Tea)	3:12
6.	"Budućnost sada" (The Future Now)	1:01
7.	"Sve" (Everything)	2:27
8.	"Radio Mitomania" (Mitomania Radio)	3:12
9.	"Čudo" (Miracle)	3:02
10.	"Jedini" (The Only One)	5:00

== Personnel ==
- Srđan Marković "Đile" (vocals)
- Miodrag Stojanović "Čeza" (rhythm machine, keyboards)
