= Urbana Gerila =

Yugoslav punk rock and new wave band

Background information
- Also known as: Punkreteni, Berliner Strasse, Berlinen Strasse
- Origin: Belgrade, Serbia, Yugoslavia
- Genres: Punk rock, new wave, post-punk, krautrock
- Years active: 1980 – 1984
- Label: Jugoton
- Past members: Zoran Kostić; Vladimir Arsenijević; Branko Rosić; Uroš Đurić; Slobodan Nešović; Branislav Babić; Nenad Krasavac; Dragoslav Radojković; Milan Tošić; Vladimir Rađenović; Petar Ilić; Marina Vulić; Slobodan Stanić; Ljubodrag Bubalo; Milan Ivanus

Urbana Gerila (Serbian Cyrillic: Урбана Герила, trans: Urban Guerrilla) was a former Yugoslav punk rock and new wave band from Belgrade. The band is notable as the participant of the Artistička radna akcija project in 1981. In 1982, the band members formed an ad hoc group Berliner Strasse (Berlin Street), influenced by post-punk and krautrock, performing songs with lyrics in German.

== History ==
Initially named Punkreteni (Punkmorons), the teenage band existed for less than two years during the early 1980s. Punkreteni consisted of Branko Rosić (bass), Vladimir Arsenijević (guitar), Zoran "Cane" Kostić (vocals) and Slobodan "Loka" Nešović (guitar). All band members were between the ages of 13 and 15. After a few weeks the band changed its name to Urbana Gerila. Nešović soon left to form his own group called Defektno Efektni. Featuring raw sound and drawing lyrical inspiration from, among other things, the events surrounding the activity of terrorist groups such as the Baader-Meinhof Group, Urbana Gerila had its first live performance as part of an event called Palilula Culture Olympics, in 1980, which was one of the first punk performances in Belgrade. Later, the band became a cult attraction, managing to sell out a Zagreb venue Lapidarij despite not having any recordings.

The band's two tracks, "Proces" ("The Trial") and "Bez naslova" ("Untitled") were released on the Artistička radna akcija (Artistic Work Action) various artists compilation in late 1981, on which Nešović's Defekno Efektni also appeared. The band performed two more songs, "Beograd" ("Belgrade") and "Ipak bojim se rata" ("Still, I'm Afraid of the War"), written before Nešović's departure, however, they were never released. After the compilation release, the band moved towards playing post-punk, influenced by Joy Division and Bauhaus, with the vocalist Branislav "Kebra" Babić, which was not well received by the audience.

In 1981, the band opened for the Rijeka-based band Paraf at the SKC in Belgrade, a show prior to which Rosić and Arsenijević decided to form an ad hoc band Berliner Strasse with the idea of various vocalists singing in different languages, but for the concert keeping only Petar "Ćirilo" Ilić who could speak and sing in German, afterward becoming a full-time member. Berliner Strasse, influenced by the British post-punk and gothic rock scene and the German krautrock scene, performed songs with lyrics in German but later on in Serbo-Croatian as well. They were later joined by Milan Ivanus on violin and Nešović whose Defekno Efektni disbanded, which was also the case with Urbana Gerila.

In February 1983, the song "1923" appeared on sixth place of the first Ventilator 202 demo top 10 list, but the song recording had never been released. During the same year, as Berlinen Strasse, with the song "Maske" ("Masks"), the band appeared on the various artists compilation Ventilator 202 demo top 10. The band also appeared in the movie Nešto između (Something in Between) in which Ilić played the drummer of the band, performing the unreleased song "Achtung America". After Branko Rosić left the serve the Yugoslav People's Army, the line up had changed, featuring various members including Marina Vulić (bass) from Električni Orgazam, and Slobodan Stanić and Ljubodrag Bubalo on synthesizers from the band Beograd. Berliner Strasse performed until 1984 when they disbanded.

== Post-breakup ==
Urbana Gerila core consisted of Branko Rosić, later to become journalist, and Vladimir Arsenijević, later to become award-winning and internationally acclaimed writer-novelist as well as co-founder and editor of the publishing house Rende. He is also the founder of the Krokodil Literary Festival.

After leaving Urbana Gerila, Zoran Kostić joined Radnička Kontrola, another band featured on the Artistička radna akcija compilation. In 1982, he became a frontman of the highly popular garage rock band Partibrejkers.

Urbana Gerila various lineups included Uroš Đurić, later painter and occasional actor, Slobodan "Loka" Nešović, later founder of Automatik Records company, Branislav "Kebra" Babić, later frontman of Obojeni Program, Nenad "Kele" Krasavac, later the founding member of Disciplina Kičme, and Dragoslav "Draža" Radojković, later member of Laibach and Kazimirov Kazneni Korpus.

== Legacy ==
In 1998, the various artists compilation Ventilator 202 vol. 1, featuring the Berliner Strasse song "Maske", appeared on the 100th place on the 100 greatest Yugoslav popular music albums list, released in the book YU 100: najbolji albumi jugoslovenske rok i pop muzike (YU 100: The Best albums of Yugoslav pop and rock music).

The Berliner Strasse unreleased song "Achtung Amerika" from the Nešto između soundtrack, was covered by the Niš electronic music group Margita Je Mrtva.

== Discography ==
As Urbana Gerila

- "Proces" / "Bez naslova" (Artistička radna akcija; 1981)

As Berliner Strasse

- "Maske" (Ventilator 202 vol. 1; 1983)
