= Vladimir Arsenijević =

Serbian novelist, columnist, translator, editor, musician and publisher

Vladimir Arsenijević Владимир Арсенијевић
- Владимир Арсенијевић
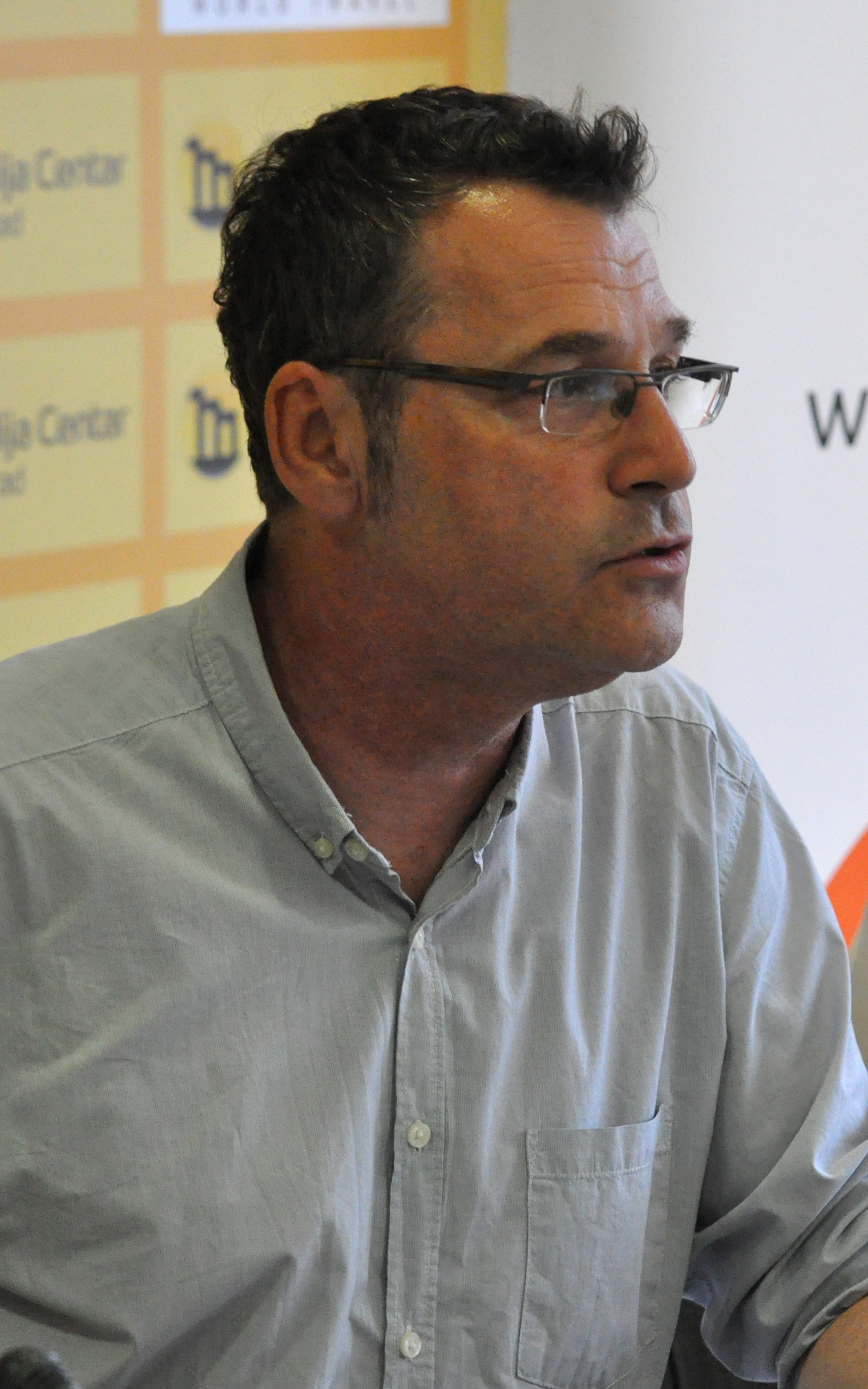
- Arsenijević in June 2017
- Born: 1965 (age 60–61); Pula, SR Croatia, SFR Yugoslavia
- Occupations: novelist, short story writer
- Writing career
- Language: Serbian
- Notable awards: NIN Award; 1994 In the Hold

Vladimir Arsenijević (Serbo-Croatian Cyrillic: Владимир Арсенијевић, born 1965) is a Serbian novelist, columnist, translator, editor, musician, and publisher. He lives and works in Belgrade. Arsenijević won the prestigious NIN Award for the Yugoslavian novel of the year 1994 for his novel In the Hold (Serbian: U potpalublju).

== Early life ==
Arsenijević was born in Pula, SR Croatia, SFR Yugoslavia, and moved to Belgrade at a young age. In his early youth, Arsenijević (nicknamed Vlajsa) played with a punk band called "Urbana Gerila" as well as its post-punk offshoot "Berliner Strasse". After graduating high school and completing the mandatory military service in 1985, Arsenijević moved to London at the age of 20. He returned to Belgrade four years later in 1989.

== Writing career ==
=== Novelist ===
Arsenijević won the 1994 NIN Award in January 1995 for his first novel In the Hold (U potpalublju), thus at the age of 29 becoming the youngest ever recipient of the prestigious award. This was the first time the Award went to an author's debut novel. The anti-war novel, which takes place during the Battle of Vukovar in autumn 1991, was one of the first works published in Serbia to discuss the violent disintegration of Yugoslavia, although from the perspective of those who lived in Belgrade at the time. The slim 128-page novel got some attention internationally such as affirmative write-up by Laura Silber in the Los Angeles Times and was soon translated into 20 languages, placing Arsenijević almost instantly among the most translated Serbian writers. Translated into English by Celia Hawkesworth, the novel received positive reviews by Ken Kalfus and Richard Eder in the New York Times and Los Angeles Times, respectively, upon its 1996 release in the United States by the Alfred A. Knopf publishing house. It was also staged as a play in the Yugoslav Drama Theatre by theater director Nikita Milivojević.

Simultaneous to writing, Arsenijević supplemented his income by working as a guide in the Kontiki tourist agency.

Since then, Arsenijević has published three other novels, two graphic novels and a book of essays. The long-awaited follow-up to In the Hold, and the second part of the envisioned tetralogy "Cloaca Maxima", novel Anđela was met with mixed criticism after it came out in Serbia in 1997. It was generally considered a weaker novel than U potpalublju and, although it was one of the best-selling novels of the year in Serbia, it failed to meet the expectations formed after the success of Arsenijević's debut novel.

As the NATO bombing of FR Yugoslavia began in March 1999, Arsenijević was in Belgrade, but got out some two months later in May through an invitation from the France-based International Parliament of Writers to visit Mexico City. He reached Mexico via Sarajevo, Ljubljana, and Frankfurt, staying there until September 2000. In Mexico City he resided in neighborhoods of Coyoacán and Colonia Condesa, mostly making a living through a series of menial jobs and on the side playing in a band called Los Armstrings. Upon returning to Belgrade in September 2000, he published his third book Meksiko - ratni dnevnik, which revolves around Arsenijević's two-month stay in Belgrade under NATO bombing missions, his sudden trip to Mexico, and his friendship with Kosovo Albanian poet Xhevdet Bajraj.

In 2004, Arsenijević came back with Išmail. This entertaining graphic novel set in 1979 is a result of the writer's collaborative work with Serbian cartoonist Aleksandar Zograf. It explores secret connections that punk and new wave scene in former Yugoslavia formed with the radical conceptual art and performance scene of the late 60's and early 70's as well as the negative influence that the politics of former socialist Yugoslavia had on both.

Predator is a crossover between a novel and a book of stories set in different parts of the world. Consisted of several, at first sight, completely different stories, it is a rhizomatically structured story of almost a dozen protagonists who have one thing in common - they are all expatriates (an Iraqi Kurdish cannibalistic refugee in the US, a Kosovo punk rocker, a Bosnian junkie, an Irish priest, Belgrade yobs, Berlin anarchists...). Coming from troubled areas of the world, they pursue their own piece of happiness, but the circumstances of their particular realities distort the picture heavily.

Jugolaboratorija, a collection of essays, columns and speeches contains around thirty texts written by Arsenijević since 2005.

In 2011 Arsenijević published Minut - Put oko sveta za 60 sekundi ("One Minute - Around the World in 60 seconds") in artistic cooperation with Valentina Broštean who illustrated and designed the book. It consists of 25 fragments/stories set within one single minute of time (January 20, 2010, from 12:00 to 12:01 GMT) at 25 different spots on planet Earth such as Samoa, Hawaii, Brazil, Portugal, Kosovo, Kurdistan, Burma, Australia or Russia.

=== Editor ===
In parallel to his literary engagement, Arsenijević got involved in publishing, forming a publishing company named Rende, where he performed the editor-in-chief duties from its foundation until 2007. Since February 2007, he's been employed as an editor at VBZ Beograd, the Croatian publishing house VBZ's Belgrade arm. Arsenijević is also a co-owner and editor at Reflektor, a Serbian publishing company releasing audiobooks. Among other works by various authors, the company has released Arsenijević's novel U potpalublju in audiobook form as read by actor Nikola Đuričko.

He is one of the founders and directors of KROKODIL literary festival held annually in Belgrade since 2009. In 2017, he has signed the Declaration on the Common Language of the Croats, Serbs, Bosniaks and Montenegrins.

=== Translator ===
In the early 2000s, Arsenijević started translating English language novels into Serbian. So far, he's translated Macho Sluts by Pat Califia, God's Boot by Brad Fox, The Sheltering Sky by Paul Bowles, Jonathan Livingston Seagull by Richard Bach, and A Good Man Is Hard to Find by Flannery O'Connor.

== Published works ==
- U potpalublju (1994)
- Anđela (1997)
- Meksiko - ratni dnevnik (2000)
- Išmail (with Aleksandar Zograf, 2004)
- Predator (2008)
- Jugolaboratorija (2009)
- Minut, put oko sveta za 60 sekundi (with Valentina Broštean, 2011)
- Let (2013)
- Ovo nije veselo mesto (2014)
- Ti i ja, Anđela (the remake of Anđela, 2016)
- Ka granici (2018)

== Columnist and commentator ==
From the mid-2000s onward, Arsenijević made a name for himself in Serbia and also in the rest of the ex-Yugoslav countries, as an outspoken columnist and sociopolitical commentator. As in his novels, his columns and public appearances are dominated by recent Balkan history and politics from the Serbian perspective. He's generally very critical of the Serbian political system, Serbian nationalism, various aspects of Serbian culture, Serbia's relations with other states in the region, Serbian role in the Yugoslav Wars. A lot of his criticism is also reserved for various individuals in the public life of Serbia such as Momo Kapor, Emir Kusturica, Dobrica Ćosić, etc. Arsenijević is a regular guest on Olja Bećković's talk-show Utisak nedelje on B92, as well as other B92 programmes.

In late summer 2007, Arsenijević wrote a piece titled "Unsere Neger, unsere Gegner" (Our Negros, Our Enemies) for German daily broadsheet Die Zeit, criticizing Serbian attitude towards Albanians living in Kosovo, which he sees as historically having been based on "offensive cliches, derision, and open hatred", comparing it to way American whites treated their own negros. Arsenijević continues that after the death of Tito and 1981 Albanian protests in Kosovo, this "Serbian casual cultural racism soon grew into violent, murderous hatred of Shiptars", which Slobodan Milošević then further developed "during his brutal tyranny into a collective Serbian paranoia of Shiptars as Serbs shuddered in disgust of Albanian uncontrollable virility and high birth rates".

=== Politika ===
From January 2008, Arsenijević began an irregular columnist stint in Politika daily whose ownership at the time was divided between German media concern WAZ-Mediengruppe and Serbian company Politika AD in which the Serbian government owns a large stake. Starting under the editorial stint of Ljiljana Smajlović, Arsenijević continued on at the paper when she got replaced with Dragan Bujošević in November 2008 following the May 2008 Serbian parliamentary election win by the ZES coalition led by Boris Tadić's Democratic Party (DS).

In March 2008, weeks after Albanians from the Serbian southern province of Kosovo unilaterally declared independence, Arsenijević wrote a piece in support of the move while urging Serbia to recognize its secessionist province as an independent state all of which got a lot of reaction in Serbia.

He ended his Politika column in March 2009.

=== Press ===
Arsenijević got hired to write a regular Saturday column in the Serbian daily newspaper Press from April 2011.

The entry that garnered most reaction was his September 2011 piece about late Momo Kapor who had died a year and a half earlier. In it Arsenijević writes about a July 1995 encounter with the famous author that took place on the Greek island of Thassos. Thirty-year-old Arsenijević was there working as a tourist guide while 58-year-old Kapor was on vacation with his wife. Arsenijević recounts certain details of their quick conversation (the two had just been introduced to one another) pertaining to Arsenijević's then budding writing career and his recent award-winning novel U potpalublju whose story takes place during the Battle of Vukovar. Based on their conversation, Arsenijević labels Kapor "the king of all sociopaths" while quoting him as having supposedly said: "You've got no reason to feel sorry for that city. It was the simplest form of provincial baroque. Practically nothing. Yes, Vukovar is nothing".

In mid-November 2011, two months after the column was published, Arsenijević appeared on HRT's talk show Nedjeljom u 2 for the twentieth anniversary of the fall of Vukovar. Before even introducing his guest by name, host Aleksandar Stanković engaged Arsenijević in a lengthy recounting of the writer's encounter with Kapor. Arsenijević recounted their conversation and once again concluded by labeling Kapor "a sociopath who was a fan of blood and death". He also revealed a personal realization that "Kapor's political views in the years since the Yugoslav Wars were not so much delivered from the platform of Serbian nationalism, but from a sociopathic one". The rest of the program centered around Serbo-Croatian relations from the 1990s onward and Arsenijević used it to express personal dissatisfaction with things ranging from Serbian government's official policy towards the country's breakaway province of Kosovo to the overall atmosphere in the capital Belgrade by saying "if Europe were a pub or a kafana, Belgrade would be that small smelly hallway that leads to the toilet".

Couple of days after the show was aired, Arsenijević got fired by Press due to "financial crisis", though many speculated that the real reason for his dismissal were his comments on Nedjeljom u 2.

=== Jutarnji list ===
From March 2012, Arsenijević started writing a monthly column for the Croatian daily Jutarnji list that's owned by Croatian media magnate Ninoslav Pavić through his company Europapress Holding. The topics Arsenijević covers mostly deal with events and individuals from public life in Serbia. Besides writing columns he occasionally interviews various public figures, artists and thinkers such as Robert Crumb, Gilbert Shelton, Tim Judah, etc.

In this period, Arsenijević also wrote for other publications: his April 2012 commentary inspired by the Eurovision Song Contest about to be held in Baku, Azerbaijan was published in German daily die Tageszeitung as a guest column. In it, Arsenijević compares Azerbaijan to Serbia, on one hand finding differences "in their respective cultural, political and economic concepts" by describing the former as a "country getting richer by the day while being muzzled by a family dynasty in the making along with its own personal nouveau riche clique" while considering the latter to be a "land of perpetual economic ruin ruled by an unscrupulous and insatiable political class", but on the other hand also noticing many similarities in what he sees as "both countries' desperate search for a new, modern identity that's in parallel accompanied by each country's respective unwillingness, or maybe even inability, to let go of old ways, creative misuses of power, and historical and territorial obsessions". He considers Azerbaijan and Serbia to both have "bad reputations in the international community" and views them both as being "well-known for widespread corruption that's deeply embedded in every pore of their societies". He further sees a similarity in how both countries handle their territorial disputes by "'defending' their disputed areas, Nagorno-Karabakh and Kosovo, respectively, in bloody wars that they later lose along with the disputed territory".

In late May 2012, Arsenijević got another columnist engagement in Croatia, writing for web portal tportal.hr.

Of his Jutarnji columns, the one that garnered most attention and reaction was Arsenijević's intricately long, stinging July 2012 denouncement and condemnation of film director Emir Kusturica. Dissatisfied with Kusturica's latest project — Ivo Andrić-inspired Kamengrad in Višegrad, Republika Srpska, Bosnia-Herzegovina, Arsenijević goes after the director, labeling him "a pompous man who, thanks to his bizarre Serbian nationalism, was able to cajolingly ingratiate himself to every ruling Serbian political figure from the 1990s onward - starting with Milošević, over to Đinđić and Koštunica, and finally Tadić, as a warm male embrace with Tomislav Nikolić surely awaits him in the near future" while describing Kusturica's previous Drvengrad project as "a monument to his own self and his own worldview with his own financial interest and personality cult installed in it, all made possible through mutual cooperation of several politicians in Serbia who couldn't agree on anything else, but nevertheless found minimum consensus over Kusturica". Arsenijević goes on to proclaim Kusturica "a two-headed beast: ethno-nationalist with a severe identity crisis, declared leftist with a far right sensibility, ruthless landowner who's also a fiery anti-capitalist, a state artist in the clothing of a faux rebel, an obedient yet astute servant of many powerful individuals" while describing him as "a man who could have been and had to have been something more, but instead turned into a sad symptom of a sad time we all live in". Arsenijević then turns to Kusturica's physical characteristics, pointing out the director is "large, strong, big-headed with a long head of hair" while describing him as "having a blast during the apocalyptic 1990s in Serbia" and wondering if "perhaps that explains Kusturica's abundance of megalomania that manifests itself through being stricken with a pharaonic complex and possessing a screaming compulsion for leaving large traces behind such as endowments, ethno-villages, pseudo-towns, etc. — Kusturica's pyramids of sorts". Arsenijević eventually gets to Kamengrad also known as Andrićgrad, blasting it as "a kitschy shopping mall in the form of an ethno-town founded on bad taste and lies, all erected by a kitschy director in a deadly-kitsch pseudo-state, the so-called Republika Srpska, represented by the man of sizable head, manly chin, cross-eyed gaze, as well as tiring and ineloquent narrative—the (in)famous Milorad Dodik". The columnist further denounces Kusturica and his project in Višegrad, laughing off its stated 'multiethnic nature' over what he sees to be the director's failure to clearly acknowledge and properly commemorate the Bosnian Muslim victims in the city during the Bosnian War, seeing this omission as "Kusturica's true legacy and his only lasting pyramid that's going to remain long after his vainly erected 'towns' have been wiped off the face of the earth". Arsenijević closes by ironically wondering how would Ivo Andrić have reacted to Kusturica's town. And answers that Andrić "has for the umpteenth time been hijacked, misused, maltreated, humiliated, and brutally raped" before imagining Andrić "a slight, physically feeble, and restrained man without a shred of Ottoman or Balkan atavism in him, 'tender and white with a painfully-thin fragrant soul'" yielding to "Kusturica's brutal appearance featuring greasy hair, withered highland never quite cleanshaven face, neurotic wrinkle in the base of the nose, and a suspicious gaze".
