= Partibrejkers II =

Studio album by Partibrejkers
- Released: September 2, 1988
- Recorded: June 1987, Barbaro studio, Bukovac; O studio, Belgrade
- Genre: Garage rock; punk rock; blues rock
- Length: 31:36
- Label: Jugodisk; LPD-0437
- Producer: Nebojša Antonijević, Milan Ćirić

Partibrejkers chronology
Partibrejkers I (1985)	Partibrejkers II (1988)	Partibrejkers III (1989)

Partibrejkers II is the second studio album by the Serbian garage rock/punk rock band Partibrejkers, released by Jugodisk in 1988.

== Track listing ==
All lyrics by Zoran Kostić, except for the tracks 4 and 5 written by Nebojša Antonijević. All music by Nebojša Antonijević, except track 10 co-written with Ljubiša Kostadinović.

No.	Title	Length
1.	"Prsten" (A Ring)	3:42
2.	"Put" (The Road)	3:45
3.	"Ja se ne vraćam" (I Am Not Coming Back)	2:00
4.	"Mesečeva kći" (Daughter of the Moon)	4:10
5.	"Kako je teško bez tebe" (How Difficult It Is Without You)	3:08
6.	"5 ispod nule" (5 Below Zero)	2:32
7.	"Bambusov cvet" (Bamboo Flower)	1:46
8.	"Ona kaže ljubav pokreće ovaj svet" (She Says Love Turns This World)	4:30
9.	"Nema cure" (There Is No Girl)	2:16
10.	"1000 zvezda (Biću tvoj)" (1000 Stars (I Will Be Yours))	2:51

== Personnel ==
Partibrejkers

- Nebojša Antonijević "Anton" — guitar
- Zoran Kostić "Cane" — lead vocals
- Vlada Funtek — drums
- Dime Todorov "Mune" — bass

Additional personnel

- Milan Ćirić — arrangements and production (with Zoran Kostić), recording
- Miroslav Cvetković — recording on track 2
- Branislav Petrović "Banana" — harmonica
- Goran Dimić — artwork
