= Pobuna mašina =

Studio album by Supernaut
- Released: 2010
- Recorded: Master Blaster studio, Belgrade
- Genre: Alternative rock, Industrial rock, Indie rock, Minimal music, Hard rock
- Length: 33:44
- Label: Self-released
- Producer: Goran Živković "Žika"

Supernaut chronology
Eli (2006)	Pobuna mašina (2010)

Professional ratings
Review scores
Source	Rating
Popboks	link

Pobuna mašina (trans. Machine Rebellion) is the fifth studio album by the Serbian alternative rock band Supernaut released independently by the band in 2010. The album is the band's final collaboration with the deceased produces Goran Živković "Žika", and is musically the third part of the album trilogy which started with Raj na nebu, pakao na Zemlji in 2000.

== Track listing ==
No.	Title	Length
1.	"Đavo pod maskom" (Devil in disguise)	3:40
2.	"Jubelo"	3:35
3.	"Igra rata" (War game)	2:49
4.	"Mlad" (Young)	3:28
5.	"Nagrada" (Reward)	3:12
6.	"Ništa zauzvrat" (Nothing in return; Roky Erickson cover)	1:57
7.	"Pobuna mašina" (Machine rebellion)	3:35
8.	"Tron agonije" (Throne of agony)	3:46
9.	"Pola čoveka" (Half human)	3:44
10.	"Nacija" (Nation)	3:58

== Personnel ==
- Srđan Marković "Đile" (vocals, guitar, sequenced by [drums])
- Saša Radić (bass guitar)
