= Eli (Supernaut album) =

Studio album by Supernaut
- Released: 2006
- Recorded: Studio 1, Akademija studio, Belgrade
- Genre: Alternative rock Industrial rock Indie rock Minimal music Experimental music
- Length: 47:02
- Label: Automatik Records; ATM 2482006-2
- Producer: Goran Živković "Žika"

Supernaut chronology
Raj na nebu, pakao na Zemlji (2000)	Eli (2006)	Pobuna mašina (2010)

Professional ratings
Review scores
Source	Rating
Popboks	7/10 stars
RockSerbia	5/10 stars

Eli is the fourth studio album by the Serbian alternative rock band Supernaut, released by Automatik Records in 2006. The album, for which the cover was designed by Srđan Marković "Đile", was elected the fifth best album of the year 2006 on the webzine Popboks annual list. The album featured guest appearance by former Profili Profili and Laibach drummer Dragoslav Radojković "Draža".

== Track listing ==
No.	Title	Length
1.	"Pakleni vozači" (Hell Drivers, Atomsko Sklonište cover)	3:12
2.	"Zločin" (Crime, The Godfathers cover)	3:43
3.	"Tablete" (Tablets)	3:45
4.	"Strast" (Passion)	2:45
5.	"Eli"	3:37
6.	"No Fun" (The Stooges cover)	4:59
7.	"Mravi" (Ants)	3:23
8.	"The Hunter" (Free cover)	5:04
9.	"Šifra" (Codename)	3:22
10.	"Sećanje" (Memory)	4:00
11.	"Human Fly" (The Cramps cover)	3:35
12.	"Mala zemlja" (Small Country)	5:37

== Personnel ==
- Srđan Marković "Đile": vocals, guitar, drum sequencing
- Saša Radić bass guitar
- Dragoslav Radojković: drums on tracks 5, 7, and 11
