= Partibrejkers I =

Studio album by Partibrejkers
- Released: January 25, 1985
- Recorded: June 1984, O studio, Belgrade
- Genre: Garage rock; punk rock; blues rock
- Length: 34:06
- Label: Jugoton; LSY 61979
- Producer: Dušan Kojić "Koja", Partibrejkers

Partibrejkers chronology
Partibrejkers I (1985)	Partibrejkers II (1988)

Partibrejkers I is the debut eponymous album by the Serbian and Yugoslav garage rock/punk rock band Partibrejkers, released by Jugoton in 1985.

The album was reissued on CD in 1995 by WTC Wien.

The album was polled in 1998 as the 18th on the list of 100 greatest Yugoslav rock and pop albums in the book YU 100: najbolji albumi jugoslovenske rok i pop muzike (YU 100: The Best albums of Yugoslav pop and rock music).

== Track listing ==
No.	Title	Length
1.	"Ako si..." (If You Are...)	2:04
2.	"Gubitnik" (Loser)	2:53
3.	"Noć" (The Night)	1:54
4.	"Hej, ti, dole u mraku" (Hey, You, Down in the Dark)	2:32
5.	"1000 Godina" (1000 Years)	4:46
6.	"Stoj, Džoni" (Stop, Johnny)	3:29
7.	"Ona živi na brdu" (She Lives On The Hill)	2:29
8.	"Ti moraš biti moja (sad)" (You Have To Be Mine (Now))	2:41
9.	"On je došao uz vetar" (He Came With The Wind)	1:59
10.	"Novi dan" (New Day)	1:36
11.	"Ulični hodač" (Street Walker)	4:07
12.	"Večeras" (Tonight)	3:03

== Personnel ==
Partibrejkers

- Goran Bulatović "Manzanera" — drums, percussion
- Ljubiša Kostadinović "Ljuba" — guitar
- Nebojša Antonijević "Anton" — organ, guitar, percussion, artwork by
- Zoran Kostić "Cane" — vocals, percussion

Additional personnel

- Branislav Petrović "Banana" — harmonica
- Branislav Trivić — saxophone
- Dušan Kojić "Koja" — organ, producer
- Miroslav Cvetković — recorded by
- Vlada Funtek — recorded by
- Stanislav Milojković — photography
