= Sloboda ili ništa =

Studio album by Partibrejkers
- Released: 2007
- Recorded: 2006–2007, Bare Wired studio, Masterblaster studio, Belgrade
- Genre: Garage rock; punk rock; blues rock
- Length: 39:02
- Label: PGP RTS; 416675
- Producer: Igor Borojević

Partibrejkers chronology
Gramzivost i pohlepa (2002)	Sloboda ili ništa (2007)	Sirotinjsko carstvo (2015)

Professional ratings
Review scores
Source	Rating
Groupie.hr	(mixed)
Muzika.hr	3.5/5 stars

Sloboda ili ništa is the seventh studio album by the Serbian garage rock/punk rock band Partibrejkers, released by PGP RTS in 2007.

== Track listing ==
All lyrics and music written by Zoran Kostić and Nebojša Antonijević.

No.	Title	Length
1.	"Sloboda ili ništa" (Freedom or Nothing)	1:47
2.	"Ćutanje" (Silence)	2:38
3.	"Ništa ne očekujem" (I Expect Nothing)	3:29
4.	"Dugo te nema" (You Have Been A Way For So Long)	3:32
5.	"Kamenje" (Stones)	3:41
6.	"Srce kuca tu je" (The Heart it is Beating Here)	5:00
7.	"Puno ljubavi" (A Lot of Love)	3:25
8.	"Lobotomija" (Lobotomy)	2:44
9.	"Biraj" (Choose)	4:14
10.	"Zamena za ljubav" (Substitute for Love)	3:25
11.	"Budući dani" (Future Days)	2:31
12.	"Koliko je sati" (What Time is It)	3:35

== Personnel ==
Partibrejkers

- Nebojša Antonijević "Anton" — guitar, vocals
- Zoran Kostić "Cane" — vocals
- Vladislav Rac — bass
- Dejan Utvar — drums

Additional personnel

- Igor Borojević — producer, featuring [guest]
- Goran Živković — mastered by
- Milan Barković "Bare" — recorded by
- Branislav Petrović "Banana" — featuring [guest]
- Ritch Bitch — featuring [guest]
- Saša Lokner — featuring [guest]
- Vlada Jagodinac — featuring [guest]
- Dušan Kojić "Koja" — featuring [guest]
- Relja Obrenović — featuring [guest]
- Goran Majkić "Goksi" — featuring [guest]
- Gabriel Glid — photography, artwork by [design]
