= Krokodil Literary Festival =

Krokodil Festival (Knjževno Regionalno Okupljanje Koje Otklanja Dosadu I Letargiju) is a literary festival, with the main event held annually in Belgrade, Serbia. The festival mostly presents authors from the region of former Yugoslavia (Croatia, Bosnia and Herzegovina, Slovenia, Montenegro, North Macedonia and Serbia) with exceptions like authors from Germany or Denmark. The main festival event is the Belgrade Summer Krokodil, a three-day or two-day festival held in June.

== Overview ==
The festival was founded in 2009. Since then there were eight main festival events held in Belgrade and several one-day festivals in Pula (Croatia), Ljubljana (Slovenia), Leipzig (Germany) and Inđija (Serbia) – as part of the "Krokodil – On the Road" programme.

Festival events have been held in the locality of the Museum of Yugoslav History.

The festival is directed by Vladimir Arsenijević and Ana Pejović.

2016-2017 Association Krokodil participated in organizing the writing of the Declaration on the Common Language.

== Visiting authors ==
The following authors have visited the festival:

2009

- Lamija Begagić (text in Serbo-Croatian)

2010

- Bekim Sejranović (text in Serbo-Croatian)
- Bora Ćosić (text in German)
- Petar Luković (text in Serbo-Croatian)
- Slobodan Tišma (text in Serbo-Croatian)

2011

- Clemens Meyer
- Goran Vojnović
- Ivana Sajko (text in Croatian)
- Mirko Kovač
- Predrag Lucić (text in Croatian)
- Saša Ilić (text in Serbian)

2020

- Lana Bastašić
- Rumena Bužarovska
- Monika Herceg
- Lejla Kalamujić
