= Joy of Europe =

- Dates: October
- Locations: Belgrade Arena; Belgrade, Serbia

Joy of Europe (Serbian: Ρадост Европе / Radost Evrope) is a European dance festival with a long tradition. The annual event takes place in Belgrade, Serbia with 30 European nations showcasing their culture through dance and music. The European nations are usually accompanied by another country from another continent.

== History ==
The Joy of Europe festival started in 1969 and has been held every year since. The founder of the festival is the City of Belgrade, which together with the Belgrade Children's Centre organises the event. The festival aims to bring together children from across Europe through song and dance by showcasing their own cultures and customs.

Joy of Europe was held even during the 1990s when Yugoslavia (now Serbia) was isolated by the international community. Over the years, the contest has grown and is accompanied by a range of children's programmes together with the main event held on the eve before the end of the 5 day festival. Until 2008 the main event was held at Belgrade’s Sava Centar. Since 2008 the event is held at the Belgrade Arena. The event is sponsored by McDonald's, company Voda Voda and Sinalco. The organiser of the festival is the Children's cultural centre.
