= Niže nego ljudski =

Studio album by Supernaut
- Released: 1998
- Recorded: Summer 1997; Tref studio, Belgrade
- Genres: Alternative rock Industrial rock Indie rock Minimal music Experimental music
- Length: 31:40
- Label: Zvono Records

Supernaut chronology
Live in Zombietown (1995)	Niže nego ljudski (1998)	Raj na nebu, pakao na Zemlji (2000)

Niže nego ljudski (Less Than Human) is the second studio album by the Serbian alternative rock band Supernaut, released by Zvono Records in 1998. This was the first studio album to feature bassist Saša Radić, and featured the band first hit song "Tata Roll". The cover for the album, available only on compact cassette, was designed by Srđan Marković "Đile". In 2009, bassist Radić announced that the band was looking for the original tapes of the band first releases, including Niže nego ljudski, in order to rerelease them on CD.

== Track listing ==
No.	Title	Length
1.	"L.S.D.B."	4:01
2.	"Niže nego" (Lower Than)	4:49
3.	"Sve" (Everything)	3:40
4.	"Tata Roll" (Papa Roll)	3:24
5.	"Tiranija" (Tyranny)	3:43
6.	"Ulele"	3:43
7.	"Ceremonija" (Ceremony)	4:36
8.	"Tata Roll - On" (Papa Roll - On)	3:28

== Personnel ==
- Srđan Marković "Đile" (vocals, guitar)
- Saša Radić (bass guitar)
- Svetolik Trifunović "Trile" (rhythm machine)

== External links and other sources ==
- EX YU ROCK enciklopedija 1960-2006, Janjatović Petar; ISBN 978-86-905317-1-4
- Niže nego ljudski at Discogs
- Niže nego ljudski at Rateyourmusic
