= Raj na nebu, pakao na Zemlji =

Studio album by Supernaut
- Released: 2000
- Genre: Alternative rock Industrial rock Indie rock Minimal music Experimental music
- Length: 36:56
- Label: Beograund; CD 002

Supernaut chronology
Niže nego ljudski (1998)	Raj na nebu, pakao na Zemlji (2000)	Eli (2006)

Raj na nebu, pakao na Zemlji (Paradise in Heaven, Hell on Earth) is the third studio album by the Serbian alternative rock band Supernaut, released by Beograund in 2000.

== Track listing ==
No.	Title	Length
1.	"Model" (Kraftwerk cover)	4:00
2.	"Because You're Mine" (Dr. Feelgood cover)	3:55
3.	"Superzao" (Superevil)	3:39
4.	"Blues za Džini" (Blues For Jeanne)	2:46
5.	"Kašika" (Spoon)	5:06
6.	"E pluribus unum" (Out of many one)	3:48
7.	"Majka milosti" (Mother Of Mercy)	4:14
8.	"Nervni sistem" (Nervous system)	4:14
9.	"Živeti uzalud" (Living In Vain)	4:40
10.	"Zašto?" (Why)	0:48

== Personnel ==
- Srđan Marković "Đile" (vocals, guitar)
- Saša Radić (bass guitar)
- Aleksandra Arizanović (backing vocals)
- Dejana Jovanović (backing vocals)
