= Partibrejkers =

Serbian rock band

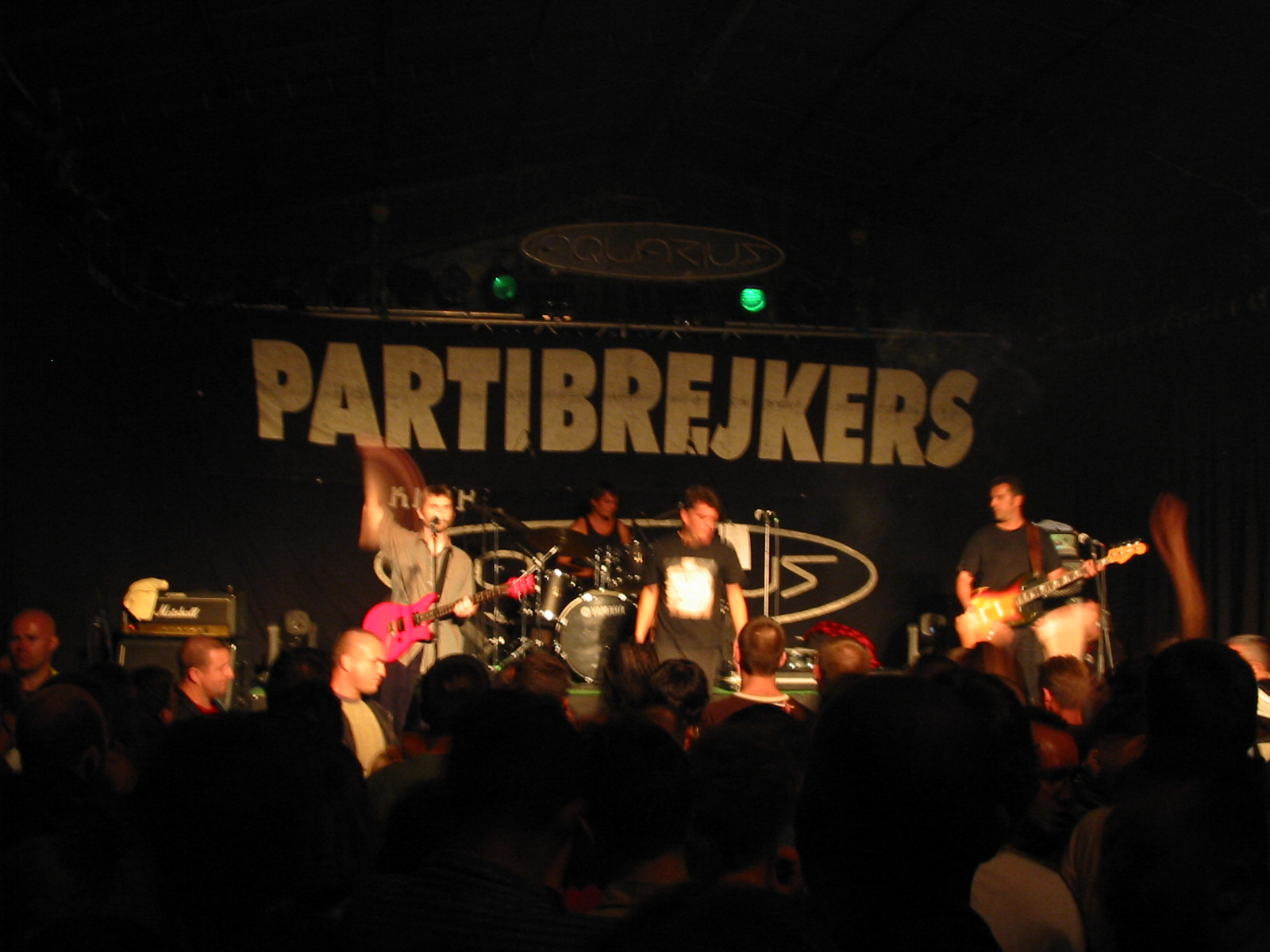
- Partibrejkers performing live in 2003

Background information
- Origin: Belgrade, Serbia
- Genres: Garage rock; rhythm and blues; punk blues; blues rock; hard rock; garage punk
- Years active: 1982–2016; 2018–present
- Labels: PGP-RTB, Jugoton, Jugodisk, PGP-RTS, B92, Hi-Fi Centar, Sorabia Disc
- Members: Zoran Kostić; Nebojša Antonijević; Darko Kurjak; Zlatko Veljović
- Past members: List: Johnny Depp Borko Petrović Dejan Utvar Dime Todorov Gojko Ševar Goran Bulatović Igor Borojević Ljubiša Kostadinović Marko Milivojević Miodrag Karajanković Nenad Krasavac Saša Vlajsović Srđan Graovac Vlada Funtek Vladislav Rac
- Website: partibrejkers.net

Partibrejkers (Serbian Cyrillic: Партибрејкерс, transliteration for: Partybreakers) is a Serbian rock band from Belgrade, as well as one of the most acclaimed acts of the Yugoslav rock scene.

The band was formed in 1982 and released its first album, Partibrejkers I in 1985 in a two guitars, drums and vocal set (no bass guitar). The band has experienced numerous line-up changes. The mainstays of the band are Zoran Kostić "Cane" (vocals) and Nebojša Antonijević "Anton" (guitar). The band has received steady critical acclaim over the years and is well received by audiences across former Yugoslavia, not only for their music, but also for their anti-war activism through the Rimtutituki project. Their influences are diverse, such as the Stooges, MC5, early Rolling Stones and New York Dolls, combined with blues, British rhythm-and-blues, rockabilly and classic rock and roll.

== History ==
=== 1980s ===
The band was formed by the former Urbana Gerila and Radnička Kontrola member Zoran Kostić "Cane" (vocals), former Republika members Goran Bulatović "Manza" (drums) and Ljubiša Kostadinović "Ljuba" (guitar) and former BG5, Butik and Šine member Nebojša Antonijević "Anton" (guitar). Bulatović named the band according to how Kostić viewed this group of individuals, a transliterated version of party-breakers.

They performed their first live show on October 4, 1982, at the Dadov Theatre, opening for the Fifties. After the appearance, the band started performing often and on one occasion, in Zagreb, they held five concerts in three days time, Branimir "Johnny" Štulić being the sound engineer at the last concert, and even offering to be the band's producer. The band's first recording, the song "Radio Utopia", was released on the various artists compilation Ventilator 202 in 1983 by PGP-RTB. Demo versions of the songs "Hiljadu godina" ("A Thousand Years") and "Večeras" ("Tonight") were often broadcast on Serbian radio stations, and the newly recorded versions of the songs were released as their first single.

For the release of the band's first album, Partibrejkers I (Partybreakers I), produced by Dušan Kojić "Koja" of Disciplina Kičme, the band combined rhythm-and-blues with punk rock, bringing anthem status to the band's songs "Ulični hodač" ("Street Walker"), "Ona živi na brdu" ("She Lives on a Hill"), "Gubitnik" ("Loser"), "Ako si..." ("If You Are...") and "Stoj, Džoni" ("Stop, Johnny"), a cover of Tomi Sovilj i Njegove Siluete version of Chuck Berry's "Johnny B. Goode". The album was recorded at the O Studio in Belgrade in June 1984 and the album cover was designed by Antonijević. As guests on the album appeared Branislav Petrović "Banana" on harmonica, producer Kojić played organ, and Branislav Trivić played saxophone. The album was rereleased by Hi-Fi Centar and VTC Wien on CD in 1999. Despite the success of the debut album, Jugoton declined to release the band's second album, stating that it "lacked rebelliousness". On summer of 1985, Bulatović left the band, being temporarily replaced by Disciplina Kičme drummer Nenad Krasovac "Kele", and in December, the band ceased to exist.

For a short period of time, Antonijević performed with the band Plaćenici, after which Partibrejkers were reformed in a new lineup, featuring a former Plaćenici drummer Vlada Funtek and former Radost Evrope bassist Dime Todorov "Mune". The band recorded the material for the second studio album in June 1987 at the Barbaro Studio in Bukovac. The recordings were sent to PGP-RTB, but they were not prone to releasing it. In the meantime, the band organized two charity concerts at the Lotus bar, buying sixteen cakes for the children of the neglected children home in Zvečanska street in Belgrade. In May 1988, Funtek left the band, being firstly replaced by Marko Milivojević, and then by former Potop and Banana member Igor Borojević. In September 1988, the band's second album, with the working title Kobila i pastuv preljubnik (A Mare and a Stallion Adulterer), was released. However, Goran Dimić, who designed the album cover, on purpose did not put the album title on the cover. Partibrejkers II featured prominent tracks "Ja se ne vraćam" ("I'm Not Coming Back"), "Prsten" ("A Ring"), "Mesečeva kći" ("Moon Daughter"), "Pet ispod nule" ("Five Degrees Below Zero") and "Nema cure" ("There Is No Girl"), for which Antonijević sang the lead vocals. The song "Put" ("The Road") was not recorded in Bukovac, but at the O Studio in March 1988 and added to the rest of the material. At the same time, MTV made a report on the band's work.

In February 1989, the band made new demo recordings, this time with the help of the Električni Orgazam frontman Srđan Gojković "Gile", who played rhythm guitar. The recordings appeared on the third album Partibrejkers III, which, like the previous, was released through Jugodisk. The album, recorded on August and September 1989, was produced by Milan Ćirić and Antonijević, mixed by Vlada Negovanović, and as guest appeared Petar Miladinović "Pera Joe" on harmonica The album cover was designed by former Kostić's Radnička Kontrola bandmate, Srđan Marković "Ðile".

=== 1990s ===
In 1990, the band started a major Yugoslav tour, and performed as an opening act on the Motörhead concerts in Yugoslavia. In late 1990, Borojević left the band and was replaced by the former Baby Kate drummer Borko Petrović. The new line-up released a live album, Zabava još traje (The Party Is Still On), recorded live in July 1991 in Zrenjanin and Vršac and released by Sorabia Disk, and in February 1992, as guests at the band's concert in Belgrade SKC appeared Emir Kusturica, a movie director and former Zabranjeno Pušenje member, Johnny Depp, an actor and former the Kids and Rock City Angels member, and Jim Jarmusch, a filmmaker and a former Del Byzanteens member. At the time, the line-up changed one more time, as original lineup guitarist Kostadinović and drummer Borojević returned to the band, and Todorov left the band, being replaced by NBG bass guitarist Saša Vlajsović.

At the beginning of the Yugoslav wars, in 1992, Antonijević and Kostić, with Električni Orgazam and Ekatarina Velika members, formed an anti-war supergroup Rimtutituki, releasing the "Slušaj 'vamo" ("Listen Up") single, released by Radio B92 and promoted in Belgrade with the band performing live in a truck while circulating the streets during the anti-war protests. In November the same year, the band was one of the first in Serbia to perform live in Slovenia, being well received by the audience and given special attention by the media. In March 1993, the band performed at the Milos club in Thessaloniki and toured Macedonia. As a part of the Ko to tamo peva? (Who's That Singing Over There?) project, the band, with Ekatarina Velika, Električni Orgazam, and Vještice from Zagreb, performed live in Prague and Berlin. The band also held two concerts in Belgium at a multimedia festival.

The fourth studio album, Kiselo i slatko (Bitter and Sweet), produced by the band themselves with Vlada Negovanović and recorded from May to December 1993 at the PGP-RTS Studio 5 and 6, featured guest appearances by the actress Branka Katić and Srđan Gojković "Gile" on backing vocals, Saša Vlajsović and Zoran Radomirović "Švaba" on bass guitar, Srđan Todorović on drums, "Pera Joe" Miladinović on harmonica, Bajaga i Instruktori member Saša Lokner on keyboards, Goran Čavajda "Čavke", Marin Petrić "Puroni" and Borko Petrović on percussion and backing vocals and Milan Mladenović on vocals, guitar and harmonica. As the most prominent tracks on the album appeared "Molitva" ("Prayer"), "Ljudi nisu isti" ("People Are Not the Same") and "Hoću da znam" ("I Want To Know").

After the album release, the band took a break until 1996 when Antonijević and Kostić reformed the band with Zrenjanin musicians, Gluve Kučke members Gojko Ševar (bass guitar) and Srđan Graovac (guitar) and Oružjem Protivu Otmičara member Darko Kurjak (drums). The band released a greatest hits compilation, Najbolje od najgoreg (The Best of the Worst), with two new songs, "Ludo i brzo" ("Mad and Fast") and "Rođen loš" ("Born Bad"), recorded in February 1996. The band then started performing live and had many successful appearances including a comeback concert held in Novi Sad in an auditorium of about five thousand people and a sold-out concert on Tašmajdan Stadium in Belgrade. At the same time, the band released a video album, Poslednji dani slobode (The Last Days of Freedom), released by Radio B92, recorded live at KST in Belgrade in June 1991. In December 1996, the band performed in Frankfurt am Main and was well received by the audience, and the following year, the band was to perform at the Belgrade Republic Square on New Year's Eve, in front of an enormous audience.

The fifth album, Ledeno doba (Ice Age), produced by Dušan Kojić, included the prominent songs "Sjajnija budućnost" ("Bright Future"), "Sit gladan" ("Fed Hungry"), "Dobro radio loše radio" ("Did Good Did Bad") and Kostić's "Ne možeš mi ništa" ("You Can't Do Anything To Me") which had already been recorded by Instant Karma on their 1996 album Roll Over (Oktopodijada 1987-1996). As guests on the album appeared "Pera Joe" Miladinović on harmonica, Saša Lokner on keyboards, Marin Petrić "Puroni" and on percussion and the Deca Loših Muzičara brass section. To promote the album and to celebrate the fifteenth anniversary, the band had a free concert at the Kalemegdan fortress in Belgrade, near the Nebojša Tower. In 1998, guitarist Graovac and bass guitarist Ševar left the band, the latter being replaced by the former Jugosloveni member Miodrag Karajanković. The new line-up performed, after a six-year break, in Sarajevo, at the sold out club Sloga. They also released a compilation album San i java (Dream And Awareness), with the new songs "Da li sam to ja..." ("Is That Me...") and "Krug" ("Circle").

=== 2000s ===
In 2000, for the first time after the breakup of SFR Yugoslavia, the band performed in Croatia. The band also worked on a new studio release, Gramzivost i pohlepa (Money-grubbing and Greed), with the drummers Miloš Velimir "Buca" and Darko Kurjak, keyboard player Bata-Bata, bass guitarist Miodrag Karjanković and percussionist Marin Petrić "Puroni". The tracks "Žurim" ("I'm Hurrying"), "Pogledaj" ("Look"), "Noćas u gradu" ("Tonight in the City") and "Razmetljivko" ("Bragg-Boy") were distinguished as the most prominent. In the meantime, the band members participated in the Christian rock project Pesme iznad istoka i zapada (Songs above the East and West) with the song "Koga ću da hvalim?" ("Whom Will I Praise?").

The band appeared on the 2002 Milan Mladenović tribute Kao da je bilo nekad... Posvećeno Milanu Mladenoviću (As If It Had Happened Sometime... (Dedicated To Milan Mladenović)) with a cover version of the song "Zajedno" ("Together"). In November 2003, the band went on a two weeks North American tour, performing in Hamilton, Toronto, Vancouver, Chicago, Los Angeles and New York. In 2005, the band performed as an opening act for Chuck Berry in Zagreb with a new line-up, with the former Kazna Za Uši and Eyesburn drummer Dejan Utvar and the former Kanda, Kodža i Nebojša bass guitarist Vladislav Rac. Together, in 2007, they released the band's seventh studio album, Sloboda ili ništa (Freedom or Nothing).

=== 2010s ===
In 2010, the band, in the line-up consisting of Kostić, Antonijević, the returner to the band Darko Kurjak (drums) and Zlatko Veljović "Laki" (bass guitar), released a live album Krš i lom (Higgledy Piggledy) through Odličan Hrčak, recorded on March 20 and 21, 2009, at the Belgrade Dom Omladine. In December the same year, the album was released for free digital download through the Exit Music record label. At the time, a monograph about the band's work, Srce kuca tu je (The Heart Beats, It's Here), edited by Flavio Rigonat, including the complete album lyrics, interviews and photographs, was published by LOM. In January 2011, on the webzine Popboks annual lists, Krš i lom was voted by the readers as the second best domestic album and Srce kuca tu je as the best book released in 2010. The following month, the critics of Popboks made a list of the best domestic albums released in the previous decade on which Sloboda ili ništa appeared in 15th and Gramzivost i pohlepa in 29th place. The band celebrated its 30th anniversary with a concert on April 2, 2012, in Belgrade Sports Hall. The concert featured Multietnička Atrakcija as the opening band. On July 15, the band performed on the Exit festival main stage.

In November 2015, the band released their eight studio album, Sirotinjsko carstvo (Empire of the Poor). The album was previously announced with the single "Sitna lova" ("Petty Money"), released in February 2014. Sirotinjsko carstvo was released by Odličan Hrčak on CD and vinyl record. The album is also available for free listening at Deezer. During the same year, Kostić became a member of the supergroup Škrtice (Cheapskates). featuring, beside him, the members of Veliki Prezir, Jarboli and Straight Mickey and the Boyz. On June 18, 2016, the band held a concert on Belgrade Tašmajdan Stadium. The concert featured the bands Drakula i Šampioni and Dža ili Bu, Disciplina Kičme leader Dušan Kojić "Koja" and Električni Orgazam members Srđan Gojković "Gile" and Branislav Petrović "Banana" as guests.

== Legacy ==
The album Partibrejkers I was voted in 1998 as the 18th on the list of 100 greatest Yugoslav popular music albums in the book YU 100: najbolji albumi jugoslovenske rok i pop muzike (YU 100: The Best albums of Yugoslav pop and rock music). The same list included the various artists compilation Ventilator 202 vol. 1, with the band's song "Radio utopija", which appeared in 100th place.

The Rock Express Top 100 Yugoslav Rock Songs of All Times list, published in 2000, included four songs by Partibrejkers: "Hoću da znam" (polled No.13), "1000 godina" (polled No.21), "Molitva" (polled No.34) and "Kreni prema meni" (polled No.66). In 2006, the song "1000 godina" was ranked No. 7 and the song "Hoću da znam" was ranked No. 21 on the B92 Top 100 Domestic Songs List. In 2011, "Hoću da znam" was voted by the listeners of Radio 202 one of 60 greatest songs released by PGP-RTB/PGP-RTS during the sixty years of the label's existence.

The lyrics of 5 songs by the band (4 written by Kostić and 1 written by Antonijević) were featured in Petar Janjatović's book Pesme bratstva, detinjstva & potomstva: Antologija ex YU rok poezije 1967 - 2007 (Songs of Brotherhood, Childhood & Offspring: Anthology of Ex YU Rock Poetry 1967 - 2007).

== Discography ==
- Partibrejkers I (1985)
- Partibrejkers II (1988)
- Partibrejkers III (1989)
- Kiselo i slatko (1994)
- Ledeno doba (1997)
- Gramzivost i pohlepa (2002)
- Sloboda ili ništa (2007)
- Sirotinjsko carstvo (2015)

== Bibliography ==
- EX YU ROCK enciklopedija 1960-2006, Janjatović Petar; ISBN 978-86-905317-1-4
