= Zoran Kostić (musician) =

Serbian rock musician

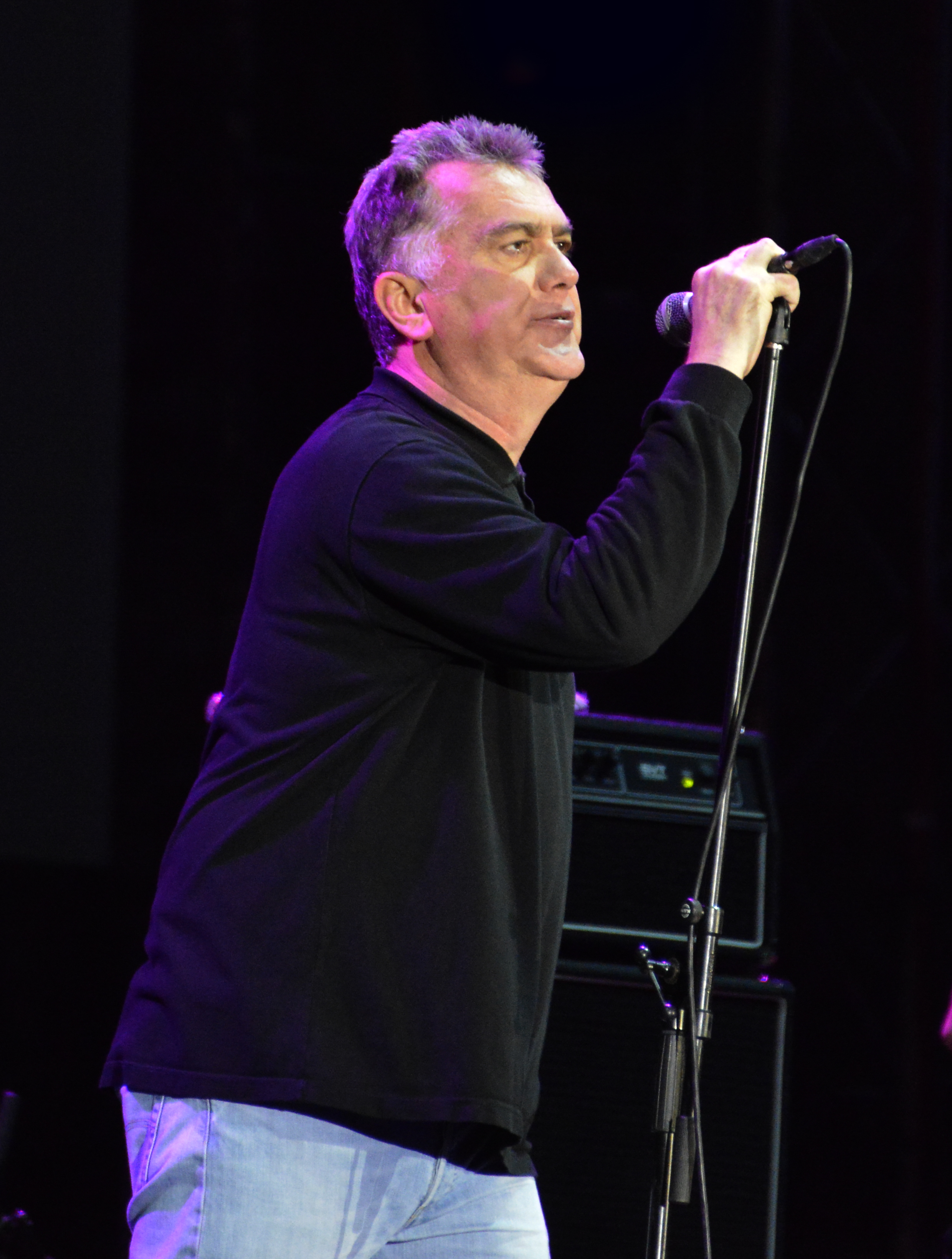
- Kostić in 2019

Background information
- Born: 17 August 1964 (age 61)
- Genres: Punk rock, garage rock, new wave, punk blues, hard rock
- Instruments: vocals
- Years active: 1979 – present

Zoran Kostić (Serbian Cyrillic: Зоран Костић; born 17 August 1964 in Belgrade) widely known by his nickname Cane (Serbian pronunciation: [tsanɛ]) is a Serbian rock musician, known primarily as the leader and vocalist for Serbian punk rock group Partibrejkers.

== Early years ==
Kostić was born in 1964 to parents Slobodan and Mirjana. He is related to Gavrilo Princip (Gavrilo's mother and his great grandfather were biological siblings). Growing up near the Ušće area of New Belgrade, he founded his first band in 1979, at the age of 15 - a group called Kopilad (Bastards). In 1980, he played with Urbana Gerila for a short time, before joining Radnička kontrola in 1981, where he played alongside some also soon-to-become-notable musicians: drummer Srđan "Žika" Todorović, lead guitarist Darko Milojković and bassist Srđan "Đile" Marković. They recorded two tracks, "Dosada" ("Boredom") and "TV u koloru" ("Color TV"), both of which appeared on the various artist compilation Artistička radna akcija, released by Jugoton in 1981. This exposure led to a spot on the showcase concert at Belgrade's Tašmajdan stadium in September 1981 with a batch of other up-and-coming acts. Kostić incessantly provoked the crowd to a point where the show had to be interrupted. This got him some, mostly negative, publicity in the daily papers by prompting a discussion on the values and morals of Yugoslav youth.

== Partibrejkers ==
In August 1982, Kostić and drummer Goran "Manzanera" Bulatović had an idea about a band called Partibrejkers. They were soon joined by guitar player Nebojša "Anton" Antonijević and guitar player Ljuba Konstandinović, and Partibrejkers were officially formed. Since the formation, Kostić has been the band's vocalist and main lyricist.

== Personal life ==
During the mid-1990s, Kostić battled illness caused by a thyroid gland problem for which he had to have surgery, and for two years Partibrejkers were on hiatus and possible brink of folding. In 1995, he got married and moved to Zrenjanin where he recuperated with his wife. Leaving the pressure of Belgrade behind, he also turned to religion which he credits for helping him calm down and instill self-discipline.
