= Bajaga i Instruktori discography =

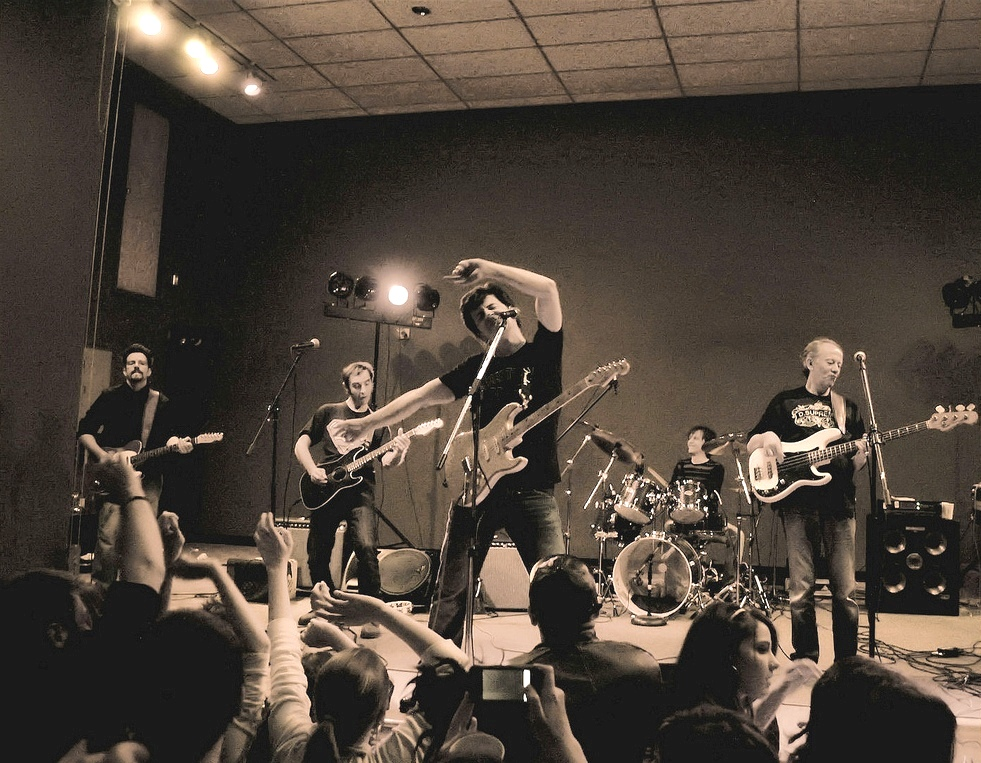
- Bajaga i instruktori performing live in 2009
- Studio albums: 9
- Extended plays: 1
- Live albums: 2
- Compilation albums: 4
- Singles: 1

This is the discography of Serbian and former Yugoslav rock band Bajaga i Instruktori. This discography consists of 9 studio albums, 2 live albums, 1 7-inch single, 1 EP, 4 compilation albums, and 1 box set. This list does not include solo material or side projects performed by the members.

== Studio albums ==
Title	Released
Pozitivna geografija	1984
Sa druge strane jastuka	1985
Jahači magle	1986
Prodavnica tajni	1988
Muzika na struju	1993
Od bižuterije do ćilibara	1997
Zmaj od Noćaja	2001
Šou počinje u ponoć	2005
Daljina, dim i prašina	2012
U sali lom	2018
Ovaj svet se menja	2020

== Live albums ==
Title	Released
Neka svemir čuje nemir	1989
Best of Live	2002
U Puli lom - Live At Arena	2019

== Extended plays ==
Title	Released
Četiri godišnja doba	1991

== Compilation albums ==
Title	Released
The best of Bajaga & Instruktori	1989
So far...the best of Bajaga & Instruktori	1993
Neizbrisano	1997
Ruža vetrova Beograda	2004
Antologija (Box set)	2010

== Singles ==
Title	Released
"All You Need Is Love (verzija 1986)" / "Jahači magle (Ukratko)"	1986
