= Valentino (band) =

Bosnian and Yugoslav pop rock band

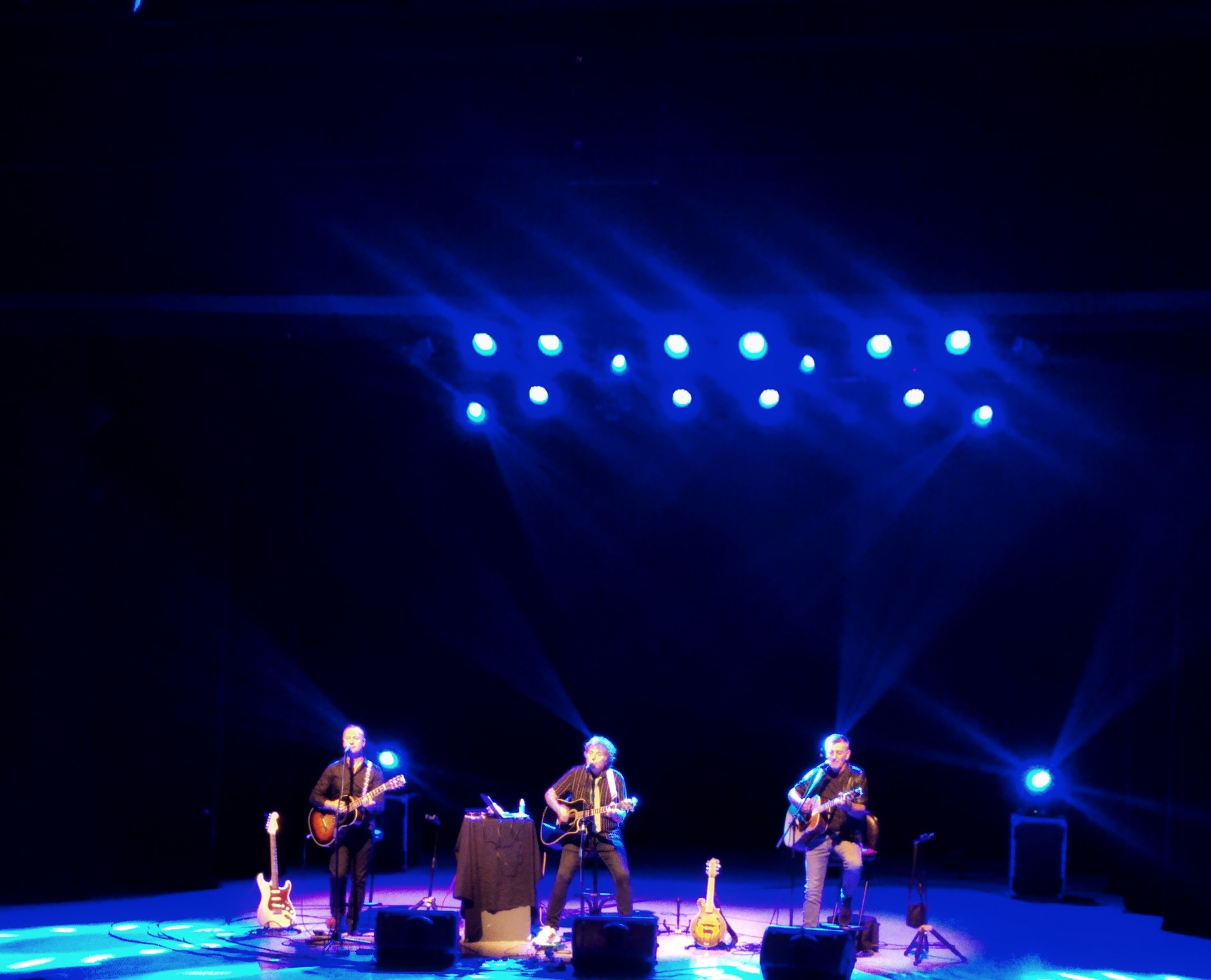
- Valentino performing unplugged in 2023

Background information
- Origin: Sarajevo, SR Bosnia and Herzegovina, SFR Yugoslavia
- Genres: Pop rock; power pop; folk rock; pop
- Years active: 1982–1991; 2001–present
- Labels: Suzy, Diskoton, Jugoton, Nimfa Sound, Croatia Records, RBS Trade, City Records, Hi-Fi Centar, SkyMusic, MixMusic
- Members: Zijad Rizvanbegović; Davor Rakičević; Zoran Timotijević; Vlada Migrić; Nebojša Sajić
- Past members: Suad Jakirlić; Emir Čolaković; Dubravko Smolčić; Mladen Miličević; Ademir Volić; Joško Gujinović; Nikša Bratoš; Gordan Prusina; Denis Habul; Zoran Petrović; Samir Šestan

Valentino is a pop rock band originally formed in Sarajevo, SR Bosnia and Herzegovina, SFR Yugoslavia in 1982, and currently based in Belgrade, Serbia.

Formed and led by guitarist and principal songwriter Zijad "Zijo" Rizvanbegović and fronted by vocalist Suad Jakirlić "Jaka", Valentino gained large popularity in Yugoslavia in the mid-1980s with their pop rock and power pop songs with folk music influences. The band recorded three albums with Jakirlić, before he departed and was replaced by Gordan "Gogo" Prusina. After recording two more albums, the group disbanded with the outbreak of Yugoslav Wars in 1991. Rizvanbegović reformed Valentino in 2001, taking over the vocal duties himself. The band has released two studio albums since and a number of new songs as singles and on compilation albums.

== History ==
=== 1982–1991 ===
Valentino was formed by Sarajevo guitarist Zijad "Zijo" Rizvanbegović, who had been aspiring to start a band for a number of years. Prior to forming Valentino, at the age of eighteen, Rizvanbegović moved to London, where he worked as a laborer, spending evenings visiting city's music clubs. After his return to Sarajevo, he made some demo recordings, also shooting music videos for two of them, "Figure voštane" ("Wax Figures") and "Randevu" ("Rendez-vous"), the videos eventually being aired on TV Sarajevo. Gradually, Rizvanbegović gathered musicians to form a band. In today's Valentino, Rizvanbegović holds the rights to every song recorded by them and has been their principle writer since inception. He spent a year looking for a vocalist, before deciding to give an ad in the Oslobođenje newspaper; the ad was answered by vocalist Suad Jakirlić "Jaka". The first lineup of Valentino, formed in 1982, featured Zijad Rizvanbegović (guitar), Suad Jakirlić (vocals), Emir Čolaković (bass guitar), Dubravko Smolčić (drums) and Mladen Miličević (keyboards). The band had their first performances as an opening act for Bijelo Dugme on their concerts in SR Bosnia and Herzegovina.

In 1984, Valentino recorded their debut album ValentiNo 1, released through Zagreb-based Suzy record label. The album's biggest hit was the song "Volim te još" ("I Still Love You"), featuring Amila Sulejmanović on vocals. The song also featured guest appearance by Bijelo Dugme guitarist and leader Goran Bregović on bass guitar. Bregović also played lead guitar on the album track "Pazi na ritam" ("Mind the Rhythm"). Other guest appearances on the album included Vatreni Poljubac leader Milić Vukašinović (percussion, backing vocals), Gino Banana leader Srđan Jevđević (guitar), Plavi Orkestar member Mladen Pavičić "Pava" (guitar), and Vrele Usne (Hot Lips) duo, consisting of Lejla Trto and Amila Čengić (backing vocals). Valentino presented themselves to audience in Yugoslav capital Belgrade in April 1984, performing as the opening act for Bajaga i Instruktori in Trade Union Hall on the promotion of Bajaga i Instruktori album Pozitivna geografija.

Prior to the recording of the second studio album, Smolčić and Miličević left the band (the latter would in the 1990s move to Los Angeles, where he would work as a music teacher), and were replaced by Ademir Volić "Kufi" and Joško Gujinović respectively, and the group was also joined by multi-instrumentalist Nikša Bratoš. Volić and Bratoš had previously been members of the band Bonton Baya, recording with them the 1983 album Elpi (transliteration for LP), and Volić had also performed with the band Gari Garincha, recording with them their 1985 studio album entitled Leptir mašna, aktn tašna i velik radni sto, plata strašna, čak izdašna, ne nisam ja za to! (Bow Tie, Briefcase, a Large Office Desk, Great Salary, Generous Even, No, I'm Not Into It!). Valentino's second studio album, entitled ValentiNo 2, was released in 1985 through Sarajevo-based Diskoton. The album brought a number of hit songs – "Bez tebe (Đubre volim te)" ("Without You (I Love You, Scum)"), "Jugovići" ("Jugovićs", the title being a Yugoslav slang for Yugoslavs) and the ballad "Ne, ne boj se". ("No, Don't Be Afraid").

The band's third studio album ValentiNo 3 was released in 1987 and produced by Bratoš. The album's hits were "Oka tvoja dva" ("Your Two Eyes"), "Nema je nema" ("She Is Gone, Gone"), "Potonule lađe (Ne, ne, ne...)" ("Sunken Ships (No, No, No...)") and "Kad me više ne bude" ("When I'm Gone"). The album was stylistically similar to ValentiNo 2, featuring pop rock sound with catchy choruses and elements of folk music. However, despite bringing several hit songs, the repetition of the well-known formula also brought a decline in popularity and resulted in split-up of the lineup which recorded the second and the third album. Jakirlić left the band due to his mandatory stint in the Yugoslav People's Army. Upon his return from the army, he did not return to music; he would later move to Germany, where he still resides, working as a professor at a faculty of mechanical engineering. Volić and Bratoš also left, Bratoš moving to Crvena Jabuka. Volić would later start a career in architecture, moving to London in the 1990s.

Jakirlić was replaced by Gordan "Gogo" Prusina and Volić was replaced by Denis Habul; Prusina had previously been the vocalist for the band Ime Ruže (Name of the Rose), recording with them the 1988 album Zapisano u zvijezdama (Written in the Stars). The new lineup recorded the group's fourth studio album, entitled ValentiNo 4 and released in 1988 through Jugoton record label. The album brought the hits "Samo sklopi okice" ("Just Close Your Little Eyes") and "Idu ptice selice" ("Migratory Birds are Leaving"), as well as the instrumental track "Saksofoni lete u nebo" ("Saxophones Are Flying to the Sky"), composed by Rizvanbegović during his holiday in Thailand.

Valentino's fifth studio album was entitled ValentiNo 5 – Ponekad noću dok grad spava (ValentiNo 5 – Sometimes at Night While the City Is Asleep) and released in 1989. The album was recorded with keyboardist Samir Šestan, formerly of the band Rezervni Točak (Spare Tire), and Belgrade guitarist Zoran Petrović. The album was produced by Željko Brodarić "Jappa". It brought the hit "Zima devedeseta" ("The Winter of '90"). At the beginning of 1990, the band, alongside Yugoslav rock acts Riblja Čorba, Galija, Bajaga i Instruktori and Viktorija, performed in Timișoara, Romania, at the three-day concerts organized two months after the Romanian Revolution. All five acts performed on three concerts in Timișoara Olympia Hall in front of some 20,000 people each night. In 1991, Valentino appeared at the MESAM festival performing the song "Kada struje nestane" ("When There's a Power Shortage"), announcing their sixth studio album. However, with the outbreak of Yugoslav Wars, the band ended their activity.

=== Post breakup ===
Following the outbreak of Yugoslav Wars and the disbandment of Valentino, Rizvanbegović moved to Visoko, where he recorded the song "Bila kuća u centru grada" ("There Was Once a House in the Town Center"). Later he emigrated to Amsterdam, and eventually to Germany. In Germany he recorded the album Moja kuća putujuća (My Travelling House) with Samir Šestan and guitarist Nihad Rahić. The album, featuring Rizvanbegović on lead vocals, was released under Valentino moniker in 1996. The album song "Nemam vize, ofentala, duldunga" ("I Have No Visa, Residence Permit, Tolerated Stay") featured guest appearances by Sarajevo singers Hari Varešanović, Saša Lošić and Alen Islamović. During 1990s, Rizvanbegović performed on a number of charity concerts and wrote music for film and theatre.

After Valentino split up, Prusina lived in Mostar, working as an editor on Herceg-Bosna Radio. In 1996, he appeared on the Melodije Mostara (Melodies of Mostar) festival with the song "Tiho, tiho" ("Quietly, Quietly") and on the Cro Fest in Neum with the song "Kad bi ove ruže male" ("If These Little Roses Could") In 1997, he once again appeared on Melodije Mostara, this time with the song "Kad nismo mogli mi" ("If We Couldn't"). After this performance, he retired from music.

=== 2001–present ===
In the summer of 2001, Rizvanbegović appeared on the Sunčane Skale festival in Herceg Novi with the song "Odlazim, korak napred, nazad dva" ("I'm Leaving, a Step Forward, Two Steps Backwards"), and later during the year he released the Valentino comeback album Sve su se moje cure udale (All My Girls Got Married). The album featured new songs, as well as new versions of songs from Moja kuća putujuća. Rizvanbegović recorded the album in cooperation with Nikša Bratoš, who produced the album and played most of the instruments on the album recording. Rizvanbegović provided lead vocals, and the album recording also featured Vrele Usne on backing vocals, brass section of the Croatian Latin music band Cubismo, as well as several former members of Valentino. After the album release, Rizvanbegović reformed the band, performing across former Yugoslavia and Europe, and in 2004 the group toured United States and Canada. In 2004, Valentino released the compilation album 20 pjesama – 20 godina (20 Songs – 20 Years), featuring a selection of the band's old songs with the addition of "Miriše mi na tebe" ("It Smells of You"), originally performed on the 2003 Budva Festival, "Ti govoriš dok šutiš" ("You Speak While You're Silent") and "Megamix", the latter composed of choruses from the band's hits.

In 2006, the compilation Balade (Ballads) was released, sold with an issue of the Serbian newspaper Kurir. During the same year, the group released its seventh studio album ValentiNo 7, produced by Vlada Negovanović. Negovanović also played guitar and bass guitar on the album recording. Rizvanbegović recorded the album with Zoran Petrović on guitar and bass guitar, and a group of Belgrade musicians: Srđan Jovanović (formerly of Oktobar 1864 and Vampiri, drums), Bojan Vasić (keyboards), Marin Petrić (of Del Arno Band, percussion), Biljana Kitanović (violin) and Martina Vrbos (vocals). Alongside new songs, the album featured a new version of the song "Pazi na ritam", originally released on the band's debut album. The song "Ja te Mićo ne volim" ("I Don't Love You, Mića") featured turbo folk singer Stoja Novaković. The compilation Platinum Collection, released in 2008, featured, alongside old hits, the new song "Šuplje cipele" ("Hollow Shoes"), featuring Rizvanbegović's wife, actress Marta Keler, on lead vocals. In 2011, the band released the live album Live! Samo sklopi okice, featuring the recording of their performance at the 2009 Belgrade Beer Fest. The band's latest release was the 2014 compilation album Hit do hita (Hit by Hit), which included new versions of the band's old songs.

The group continued its activity in 2020s with singles "Medley" (2021), "Da se rodim ponovo" ("If I Was Born Again", 2021) and "Neću kući" ("I Don't Want to Go Home", 2023).

== Legacy ==
Croatian tamburica band Agrameri recorded a folk cover of Valentino song "Oka tvoja dva" for their 1997 self-titled album, winning the Porin Award for their version.

== Discography ==
=== Studio albums ===
- ValentiNo 1 (1984)
- ValentiNo 2 (1985)
- ValentiNo 3 (1987)
- ValentiNo 4 (1988)
- ValentiNo 5 – Ponekad noću dok grad spava (1989)
- Moja kuća putujuća (1996)
- Sve su se moje cure udale (2003)
- ValentiNo 7 (2006)

=== Live albums ===
- Live! Samo sklopi okice (2011)

=== Compilation albums ===
- Najbolje godine (1988)
- Moje najljepše pjesme (1996)
- Naj Valentino (1998)
- Miriše mi na tebe + Hitovi (2003)
- 20 pjesama – 20 godina (2004)
- Balade (2006)
- Platinum Collection (2008)
- Hit do hita (2014)
- The Best Of (2021)
