= Sa druge strane jastuka =

Studio album by Bajaga i Instruktori
- Released: March 13, 1985
- Genre: Pop rock
- Label: PGP-RTB
- Producers: Kornelije Kovač, Saša Habić

Bajaga i Instruktori chronology
Pozitivna geografija (1984)	Sa druge strane jastuka (1985)	Jahači magle (1986)

Sa druge strane jastuka (trans. On the Other Side of the Pillow) is the second studio album from Serbian and former Yugoslav rock band Bajaga i Instruktori, released in 1985. Although it is the first album released under the name Bajaga i Instruktori—Pozitivna geografija being released as Bajaga's solo album—Sa druge strane jastuka is considered Bajaga i Instruktori second studio album by the band themselves.

The album was polled in 1998 as the 13th on the list of 100 greatest Yugoslav rock and pop albums in the book YU 100: najbolji albumi jugoslovenske rok i pop muzike (YU 100: The Best albums of Yugoslav pop and rock music).

== Track listing ==
No.	Title	Lyrics	Music	Length
1.	"220 (Note: Commonly listed incorrectly as "220 u voltima" ("220 in volts"))" ("220")	M. Bajagić	M. Bajagić	3:31
2.	"Vidi šta mi je uradio od pesme, mama" ("Look What He's Done to My Song, Mom”)	M. Bajagić	M. Safka	2:45
3.	"Nemoj da budeš nja nja" ("Don't Be Cranky")	M. Bajagić	M. Bajagić	3:48
4.	"Ti se ljubiš (Na tako dobar način)" ("You Kiss (In such a great Manner)")	M. Bajagić	M. Bajagić	2:54
5.	"Dobro jutro, džezeri" ("Good Morning, Jazzers")	M. Bajagić	M. Bajagić	3:02
6.	"Sa druge strane jastuka" ("On the Other Side of the Pillow")	M. Bajagić	M. Bajagić	3:52
7.	"Šarene pilule za Li-Lu-Le" ("Colored Pills for Li-Lu-Le")	M. Bajagić	M. Bajagić	2:45
8.	"Dvadeseti vek" ("Twentieth Century")	M. Bajagić	M. Bajagić	4:26
9.	"Francuska ljubavna revolucija" ("French Love Revolution")	Ž. Milenković	M. Bajagić	3:07
10.	"Nemoj da se zezaš sa mnom" ("Don't Mess around with Me")	M. Bajagić	M. Bajagić	2:10
11.	"Zažmuri" ("Close Your Eyes")	M. Bajagić	M. Bajagić	4:02

== Background and recording ==
Due to the success of their debut album, Bajaga i Instruktori were given unlimited studio time in PGP-RTB's Studio 5, which was at the time the most advanced recording studio in the Balkans. The band entered Studio 5 in November 1984, with their songs already finished, but recording and mixing were nevertheless completed only in February 1985.

According to Bajagić, the band's second album was not created on a particular concept: "It was a sort of a good sequel to Geografija. At the time we spent a lot of time together as a band. We were kids, we had plenty of time, and whenever we met, we played these songs. So, everybody knew it was going to be OK."

"Dobro jutro, džezeri" featured guest appearances from two prominent jazz musicians, Mića Marković and Stjepko Gut, who both liked the song's lyrics and accepted the band's invitation to play on the record.

Upon hearing the recorded material, Bajagić had some second thoughts about its quality, and even considered at one point to release only "Dobro jutro, džezeri" and "Zažmuri" as a single.

== Compositions ==
In a 2009 interview with journalist Aleksandar Arežina, Bajagić commented on the songs:

=== "220" ===
"The very first time we played it live was in Kulušić. [...] I had had a good riff, and I wanted a song to open shows with. The riff goes first, then the drum, [...] then the whole band. We used to open and close concerts with '220' for a long time. I always loved songs like "Should I Stay or Should I Go", the ones with a good riff. Nele Stamatović played the solo that we didn't like straight away, so we made an agreement - he will play the solo, and we will play it backwards. The most interesting thing now is that when [Marko Nježić] Kića learned to play the solo, he, without knowing, played the solo like on the album."

=== "Vidi šta mi je uradio od pesme, mama" ===
The song is a cover of the 1970 song "What Have They Done to My Song Ma" by Melanie Safka. Bajagić commented:

"I loved that Melanie Safka song when I was a kid because it had a good melody and a stanza in French, which I thought was interesting. [Album producer] Bata [Kovač] did the arrangements, and I think he did great. He played the harmonica solo on the synthy, and it was great. It was among the first songs [from the album] to become a hit, because people knew it already. Cukić sings a part of it. Deša [Cukić] is great on stage, [...] he can't stay still."

=== "Nemoj da budeš nja nja" ===
"I loved reggae. Bob Marley, Peter Tosh and Eddy Grant. Around the time of the debut album I even used to wear a rastacap. The song was played by [Goran Grbić] Grba, Neša Petrović, and a young jazz crew, not by Stjepko and Mića. We thought they [Grbić and Petrović] weren't that perfect as these old guys [Stjepko Gut and Mića Marković]. Reggae is always played a little bit sloppy. We wanted to have something like brass players from Jamaica, which never sound like jazz musicians, but as amateurs playing trumpets. These guys [Grbić and Petrović] weren't amateurs, but were still young jazzers at the time. One of the dearest reggae pieces I made."

=== "Ti se ljubiš (Na tako dobar način)" ===
"A classic rock song we did in pop arrangement. That was the time when stuff like Billy Idol was very popular. [...] The guitar was played by Krle [Dragan Jovanović of Generacija 5]. [...] On concerts we adjusted 'Ti se ljubiš' to rock 'n' roll, because that's what it basically is. On Sa druge strane jastuka it was adjusted to the time."

=== "Dobro jutro, džezeri" ===
"We all loved jazz, especially Vlajko [Golubović]. Within the Youth Center, where we rehearsed, there was a jazz club that stayed open until 2a.m., which wasn't customary at the time. We often hung out with jazzers because we used to keep our instruments in the same room and we often used to stay together until 3 or 4 a.m. [The verse] 'Dole ispod Slavije, kada šina savije' ('Down under Slavija, where the tram road turns') is a real experience from when we used to go home from the Youth Center. Later, one of the jazzers said to me: 'You're not even a jazz musician, but you made one of the rare domestic jazz standards'."

=== "Sa druge strane jastuka" ===
"A ballad that flirts with reggae a bit. [...] Mića and Stjepko played a very good theme here. Sounds great, although it wasn't easy to play. I think Sa druge strane jastuka is a good name for an album. All the love songs there are in a way on the other side of the pillow when you sleep. The name of the album should be something that can connect other songs as well."

=== "Šarene pilule za Li-Lu-Le" ===
"A funny anti-drug song. At the time, people used to take all sorts of things. I think the Miša Vukobratović-directed video, where Žika plays a bearded doctor, is the best explanation of the song. The song itself is half-punk with a melodic refrain. It's a small dig at psychiatry. Even during socialism psychiatrists used to resolve a lot of problems with pills instead of conversation. The easiest thing is to prescribe pills to someone. [The song is] a critique of that practice."

=== "Dvadeseti vek" ===
"I wanted to have a discothèque-friendly song. Disco rock with a slight influence of James Brown and of course of Beethoven's Symphony No. 9. I loved the film Twentieth Century, it was an interesting title, so I wrote the song. There's a little critique of playback. We thought it was crazy [...] Deception of the audience! I wrote a rap part for Žika to sing. Rap wasn't that popular at the time, but there were short forms in which someone talked. I thought it would be fun if there was another voice. I always did that, to have both male and female voices. I can only listen to Johnny Cash singing twelve songs alone."

=== "Francuska ljubavna revolucija" ===
"Bata thought that a French accordion would sound great there. Our friend Mita, a folker, knew how to play some French stuff on the accordion. Žika was singing in a partially fictional French [...] Then I wrote new lyrics, and Bata and Žika agreed it should be followed by a march. And it sounds great, it does well for us at concerts. We played some festival in Toulouse in 1985, and they thought it was interesting."

=== "Nemoj da se zezaš sa mnom" ===
"I wanted us to have a classic twelve bar rock and roll, because it's always good for concerts. A fun song, with lyrics without much importance, like in the most of twelve bars."

=== "Zažmuri" ===
"I wrote it in my Kosovska Street apartment. Slow tempo, my voice additionally low and only three chords, but I think it has a good atmosphere. The first song with the atmosphere I was completely satisfied with. Bata did the arrangements and we didn't interfere. I think he did great. Actually, it’s a very simple song where I showed that sometimes the simplest is the best. Somewhere between a ballad and a lullaby. For the Hit meseca [Hit of the Month] show [when they decide to feature you as an act], they'd leave the song selection up to you. We chose "Zažmuri". If someone asks you: 'What kind of songs chart high on Hit meseca', the answer is always: 'Fast-paced ones with plenty of hit potential'. That's why the PGP-RTB [record label] guys were furious, telling us: 'Are you insane, why didn't you choose one of the fast ones?' But the Hit meseca people happened to like it. They even gave us a great budget and two days to record a video, which was amazing since videos were usually recorded in three hours... And we made the dumbest video possible. Me, with a dog, on the snow... And then we're hugging in some apartment. Completely bonkers, total piece of shit. Even the video's director, Milutin Petrović, admitted so later, so I can say it now. It was so bad that they played it once, then once more on the following show, and for the third one they called us in to perform live because they no longer wanted to play the video, it was that awful. Before that, someone from Bijelo Dugme—I can't remember whether it was Ipe Ivandić or Zoran Redžić—told us: 'It's not easy to go with the ballad first'. Even so, we still reached the top of the Hit meseca's chart."

== Personnel ==
- Momčilo Bajagić - guitar, vocals, arranged by
- Dejan Cukić - vocals
- Žika Milenković - vocals
- Miroslav Cvetković - bass guitar, backing vocals
- Nenad Stamatović - guitar
- Vladimir Golubović - drums, percussion, arranged by

=== Additional personnel ===
- Dragan Jovanović - guitar
- Branko Mačić - jazz guitar
- Nenad Stefanović - bass guitar
- Sava Medan - double bass
- Rade Radivojević - bass guitar
- Tihomir Jakšić - saxophone
- Milivoje Marković - saxophone
- Jovan Maljoković - saxophone
- Slobodan Grozdanović - trombone
- Goran Grbić - trumpet
- Vladimir Krnetić - trumpet
- Stjepko Gut - trumpet, flugelhorn
- Kornelije Kovač - keyboards, producer, arranged by
- Ljilja Sađil - backing vocals
- Marina Sađil - backing vocals
- Saša Habić - producer
- Đorđe Petrović - recorded by

== Reception and legacy ==
Soon after the album release, the songs "220", "Vidi šta mi je uradio od pesme, mama", "Ti se ljubiš (Na tako dobar način)", "Šarene pilule za Li-Lu-Le", and the ballads "Dobro jutro, džezeri", "Sa druge strane jastuka" and "Zažmuri" became huge hits.

The album was polled in 1998 as the 13th on the list of 100 greatest Yugoslav rock and pop albums in the book YU 100: najbolji albumi jugoslovenske rok i pop muzike (YU 100: The Best albums of Yugoslav pop and rock music).

In 2000, the song "Zažmuri" was polled No.70 on the Rock Express Top 100 Yugoslav Rock Songs of All Times list. In 2006, the same song was polled No.40 on the B92 Top 100 Domestic Songs List. In 2011, the song "Ti se ljubiš (Na tako dobar način)" was voted, by the listeners of Radio 202, one of 60 greatest songs released by PGP-RTB/PGP-RTS.

== Covers ==
- The song "Francuska ljubavna revolucija" was covered by the Serbian punk rock band Six Pack, their version entitled "La Musique", on their 2004 album Musique, with Žika Milenković making a guest appearance on the song.
- The song "Ti se ljubiš (Na tako dobar način)" was covered by the Serbian pop singer Teodora Bojović on her 2004 album Teodora.
