= Dejan Cukić =

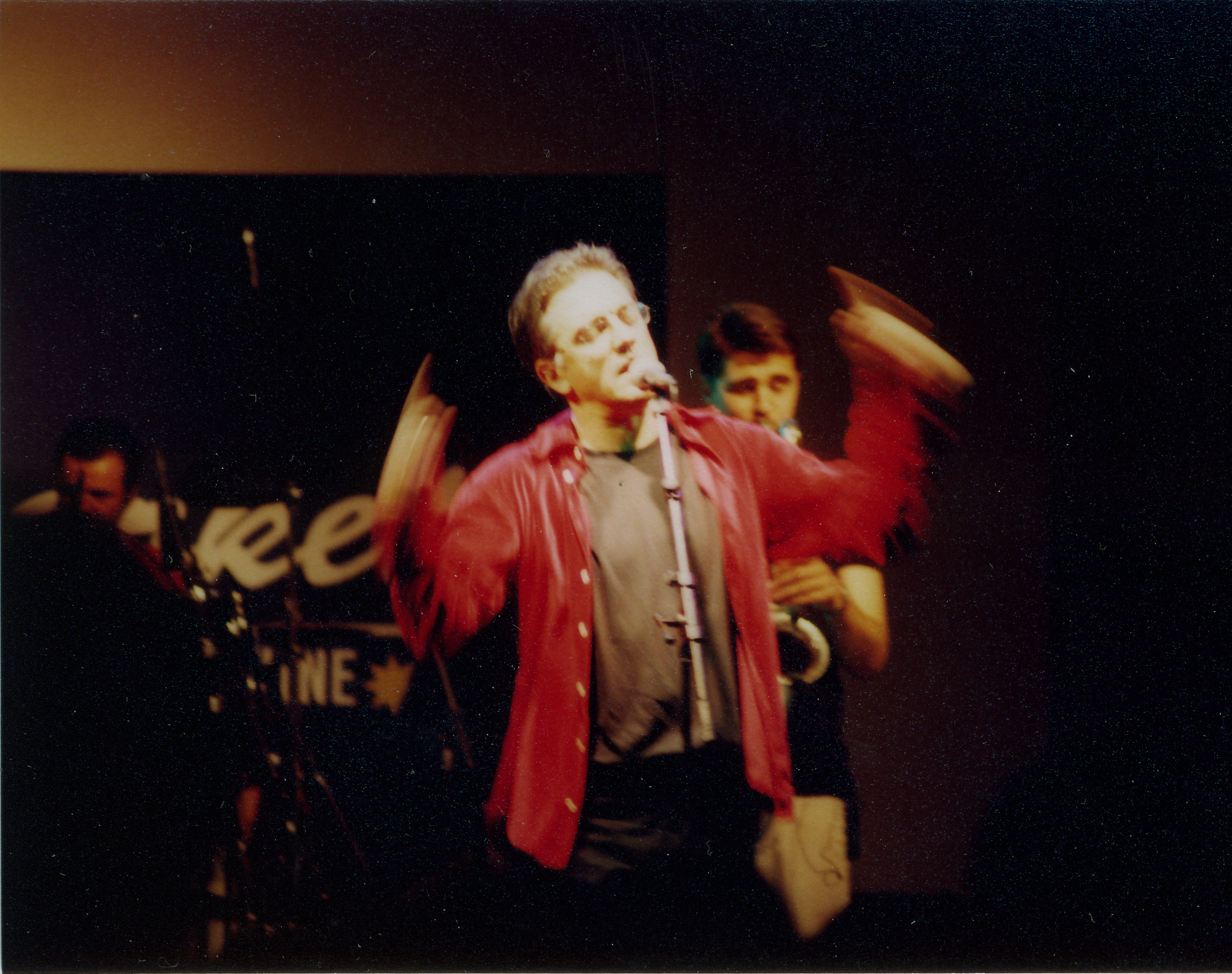
- Dejan Cukić performing in Niš in early 2000s
- Born: November 4, 1959 (age 66); Belgrade, PR Serbia, FPR Yugoslavia
- Occupations: Musician; songwriter; journalist; author; translator
- Years active: mid-1970s–present
- Musical career
- Genres: New wave; punk rock; rock; pop rock
- Instruments: Vocals; guitar; percussion
- Labels: PGP-RTB; PGP-RTS; W.I.T.; Komuna Belgrade; CIP Publik; Atelje 212; BK Sound; Multimedia Records; Croatia Records
- Formerly of: Bulevar; Bajaga i Instruktori

Dejan Cukić (Serbian Cyrillic: Дејан Цукић; born 4 November 1959) is a Serbian and Yugoslav rock musician, journalist, author and translator.

Cukić started his musical career as a teenager, rising to prominence in late 1970s as the frontman of the new wave band Bulevar. He released two albums with the band before they split up in 1982. After Bulevar disbanded, he devoted himself to journalism, writing for music magazine Rock and other publications. He returned to music in 1984, when he became one of the vocalists of the newly-formed pop rock band Bajaga i Instruktori, which would soon after the formation rise to nationwide popularity. Cukić recorded three albums with the group, before releasing his first solo album in 1987. Soon after, he left Bajaga i Instruktori, pursuing solo career which spans to the present day. Forming his backing band Spori Ritam Band in 1988, Cukić has released nine studio albums and two live albums as a solo artist.

In addition to his musical career, Cukić has written for a number of publications, hosted several radio shows, authored four books on popular music and translated a number of biographies and autobiographies of rock musicians and bands.

== Biography ==
=== Early life and career ===
Dejan Cukić was born on 4 November 1959 in Belgrade. As a high school student, he became a vocalist in his first band, Dizel (Diesel). After leaving Dizel, he joined the band Tilt.

=== Musical career ===
==== Bulevar (1978–1982) ====
After Tilt disbanded in 1978, Cukić, with two other former Tilt members, guitarist Nenad Stamatović and drummer Predrag Jakovljević, and bass guitarist Branko Isaković formed the new wave band Bulevar (Boulevard). The four were soon joined by keyboardist Dragan Mitrić. The band released two albums, the 1980 Loš i mlad (Bad and Young) and the 1982 Mala noćna panika (A Little Night Panic), to moderate success, with Loš i mlad bringing a minor hit "Meni treba nešto vruće" ("I Need Something Hot") and Mala noćna panika bringing hits "Unutrašnja panika" ("Inner Panic") and "Trenutni lek" ("Momentary Remedy"). The group disbanded in 1982, as Cukić, Stamatović and Mitrić were all drafted to serve their mandatory stints in the Yugoslav People's Army.

==== Bajaga i Instruktori, first solo album (1984–1988) ====
In 1984, after not performing for two years, during which he pursued a career in journalism, Cukić took part in the recording of Pozitivna geografija (Positive Geography), a solo album by Riblja Čorba guitarist Momčilo Bajagić "Bajaga". Soon after, Bajagić departed from Riblja Čorba, forming the band Bajaga i Instruktori from the musicians that participated in Pozitivna geografija recording; Cukić thus became one of three Bajaga i Instruktori vocalist (the other two being Bajagić and Živorad "Žika" Milenković), also playing smaller percussion instruments on the band's live performances. Following Pozitivna geografija, Cukić recorded two more albums with Bajaga i Instruktori, the 1985 Sa druge strane jastuka (On the Other Side of the Pillow), and the 1986 Jahači magle (Fog Riders), both released to large commercial success and critical acclaim.

In the spring of 1987, Cukić released his first solo album, Spori ritam (Slow Rhythm). He recorded the album with guitarists Safet Petrovac and Vlada Negovanović, bass guitarist Branko Isaković, drummer Dragoljub Đuričić, and keyboardists Dragan Mitrić and Saša Lokner, the latter being Cukić's bandmate from Bajaga i Instruktori. The album was produced by Saša Habić. The songs were authored by Cukić, Mitrić, Bajagić, Bezobrazno Zeleno leader Bojan Vasić "Vasa" and Piloti leader Zoran "Kiki" Lesendrić. The album also included a cover of Azra song "A šta da radim" ("What Should I Do"). During the summer of the same year, Cukić went with Bajaga i Instruktori on their Soviet Union tour, performing with the group for the last time. In the spring of 1988, he parted the ways with the group amicably, dedicating himself to his solo career.

==== Solo career (1988–present) ====
In 1988, Cukić formed his backing group, Spori Ritam Band (Slow Rhythm Band). The first lineup of the band featured Dragan Mitrić (keyboards), Vlada Negovanović (a former Doktor Spira i Ljudska Bića and Tunel member, guitar), Safet Petrovac (a former Piloti member, guitar), Slobodan Jurišić (a former Mama Co Co and Točak Band member, drums), and Branko Isaković (a former Bulevar, Suncokret and Idoli member, bass guitar). In 1989, Isaković moved to Kerber, and on the recording of Cukić's second album Zajedno (Together) bass guitar was played by Bata Božanić. Zajedno, released in 1989 under Dejan Cukić & Spori Ritam Band moniker, featured songs composed by Cukić and Mitrić, with lyrics written by Cukić, Bojan Vasić and Nikola Čuturilo. The title track was a cover The Beatles song "Come Together". Following the album release, Petrovac left Spori Ritam Band, and the group was joined by bass guitarist Nenad Novaković (formerly of Jugosloveni).

In late 1990, both Isaković and Petrovac returned to Spori Ritam Band, and Cukić and the group recorded the album 1991. It featured a new version of Bulevar song "Nestašni dečaci" ("Wild Boys"). With the outbreak of Yugoslav Wars in 1991, Cukić and Spori Ritam Band went on what would eventually become a three-year hiatus.

In 1994, Cukić returned to the scene with the compilation album San na pola puta (A Dream on the Half of the Road), including several songs which did not appear on his studio releases – "Julija", the ballad "Ruža ispod pepela" ("Rose under the Ashes"), which originally appeared on the 1992 various artists album S one strane duge (Over the Rainbow), a cover of Arsen Dedić's "Sve što znaš o meni" ("Everything You Know about Me"), which originally appeared on the 1991 various artists album Beograde ((Oh,) Belgrade), and a new version of Bulevar song "Trenutni lek" ("Momentary Remedy"). In 1994, Cukić performed at an unplugged festival held in Belgrade's Sava Centar, with an unplugged version of "Ruža ispod pepela" appearing on the 1996 various artists live album Bez struje (Unplugged) recorded at the event. At the end of 1995, Negovanović left Spori Ritam Band to become a member of Bajaga i Instruktori, continuing to occasionally collaborate with Cukić.

Cukić's following studio album, 4 ½... Ja bih da pevam... (4 ½... I Want to Sing...), was released in 1996. It featured a cover of Đorđe Marjanović song "Zvižduk u osam" ("Whistle at Eight"), a cover of Stephen Stills song "Love the One You're With", entitled "Volim kad si tu" ("I Love When You're There"), and a cover of Doobie Brothers song "Long Train Running", entitled "Dugo putovanje vozom" ("A Long Journey via Train"). The song "Mokre ulice" ("Wet Streets") featured guest appearance on vocals by Branimir "Johnny" Štulić, who also co-wrote the song with Cukić. The album also featured lyrics authored by Bora Đorđević and Nikola Čuturilo. Backing vocals on the album were provided by Zana vocalist Jelena Galonić and Marija Mihajlović, and the latter would, after the album release, become an official member of Spori Ritam Band. On 26 January 1996, Dejan Cukić and Spori Ritam Band held an unplugged concert in Novi Sad's Studio M, the recording of which was released the following year on the live album Unplugged. The performance featured guest appearances by saxophonist Deže Molnar and percussionists Maja Klisinski and Gradimir Milosavljević "Puba". In the summer of 1996, Cukić and Spori Ritam Band appeared at Music Festival Budva with the song "Na moru ljubavi" ("On the Sea of Love"), and in 1997, they appeared at the festival with the song "Karneval" ("Carnival").

At the end of 1998, Cukić and Spori Ritam band released the album Igramo na ulici (Dancing in the Street). The songs were composed by Cukić and Mitrić, with part of the lyrics written by Srđan Mihaljević. The album was produced by Vlada Negovanović and brought hit songs "Bulevari" ("Boulevards"), "Igramo na ulici" and "Stranac u Beogradu" ("Stranger in Belgrade"). It also included The Beatles-inspired instrumental "Pored reke" ("By the River").

In 2000, Cukić recorded covers of Bob Dylan songs with Serbian language lyrics, translated by himself, for the theatre play Divlji med (Wild Honey), performed in Atelje 212 theatre and directed by Dejan Mijač. Cukić released these covers on the 2000 album Divlji med – Pesme Boba Dilana (Wild Honey – Songs of Bob Dylan). Featuring only Cukić on acoustic guitar and vocals, Branko Isaković on acoustic guitar and bass guitar and Zona B member Ljuba Đorđević on harmonica, the album was Cukić's first release since his 1987 debut Spori ritam not recorded with Spori Ritam Band.

In 2001, Cukić released Kalendar (Calendar), also recorded without Spori Ritam Band, his first album to feature all songs authored by himself. The album was produced by Mirko Vukomanović and featured Nikola Čuturilo, Vidoja Božinović (of Riblja Čorba) and Željko Markuš on guitar, Uroš Marković on guitar and keyboards, Nenad Stefanović "Japanac" on bass guitar, Branko Isaković on acoustic guitar, Ana Đokić (of Orthodox Celts) on violin and other musicians. The song "U snovima" ("In My Dreams") was a duet recorded with singer Tedora Bojović. The album included two bonus tracks, a cover of The Rolling Stones song "(I Can't Get No) Satisfaction", featuring Bajagić, Žika Milenković and Riblja Čorba frontman Bora Đorđević, and a cover of The Beatles song "Strawberry Fields Forever", featuring St. George String Orchestra. On 16 November 2002, Cukić, backed by Spori Ritam Band, held a concert in Belgrade's Sava Centar, the recording of which was released the following year on the live album DC & SRB @ SC. The band's new bass guitarist Peđa Milanović debuted on the album.

In summer of 2007, Cukić presented his new single "Kud me vetar doziva" (Where the Wind Calls Me) at Music Festival Budva. The song appeared on the studio album Ubrzanje! (Acceleration!), released in 2008. The album featured several producers – Mirko Vukomanović, Vlada Negovanović, Voja Aralica, Ted Yanni, Predrag M. Milanović and Kornelije Kovač, some of which also authored part of the songs. As its predecessor, Ubrzanje! included two bonus tracks, a cover of Azra song "Obrati pažnju na poslednju stvar" ("Pay Attention to the Last Tune") and a different version of "Zauvek mlad"—a cover of Bob Dylan's "Forever Young"—than the one appearing on Divlji med – Pesme Boba Dilana.

In 2013, Cukić released the compilation album Priče o ljubavi (Stories About Love), in order to celebrate 25 years of solo career. The album included two new songs, "Prava ljubav" ("True Love") and "Priča o ljubavi" ("Story about Love"), the latter co-authored with Nikola Čuturilo. On 22 October 2015, Cukić reunited with the original members of his first band Tilt, for a performance at the Mikser club in Belgrade, organized in order to mark the start of the Belgrade Rock Museum initiative. In July 2017, in order to celebrate 30 years of solo career, Cukić released the single "Od šanka do šanka" ("From Bar to Bar"), a cover of a song by singer-songwriter Andrej Šifrer.

In 2019, Cukić released his latest studio album Ulica bez brojeva (Streets without Numbers), his first studio album since the 1998 Igramo na ulici to be released under Dejan Cukić & Spori Ritam Band Moniker. The songs were authored by Cukić, Dragan Mitrić, Momčilo Bajagić, Nikola Čuturilo and Mirko Vukomanović. The album brought minor hits "Prvi let" ("The First Flight"), "Pamet u glavu" ("Be Smart") and "Srce od kamena" ("Heart of Stone"). During the same year, Cukić and actress Jelena Gavrilović recorded a cover of Eva Braun song "Bečej noću" ("Bečej at Night"), released as a single.

==== Other musical activities and guest appearances ====
In 1985, Cukić took part in the YU Rock Misija project, a Yugoslav contribution to Live Aid, contributing vocals to the song "Za milion godina". In 1990, he made a guest appearance on the album Samo je ljubav (Only Love Is) by Yugoslav band Kotrljajuće Kamenje, providing vocals for the title track, also featuring guest appearances by Dražen Žerić "Žera", Janez Bončina "Benč", Mladen Vojičić "Tifa", and Zorica Kondža.

Cukić provided vocals for the song "Disko kugla" ("Disco Ball") recorded by the Minival project. He provided vocals for the Tužne Uši cover "Probudi se i ustani" ("Wake Up and Rise"), released on the various artists tribute album 3bjut to Tužne Uši. He recorded vocals in the song "Ti si moj brat" ("You Are My Brother"), released on the 2022 various artists album Plan B Vol. 01.

He wrote the song "Uvek divan dan" ("Always a Lovely Day") for the 2013 album Kolibri planeta (Hummingbird Planet) by the children's choir Kolibri.

=== Journalistic career ===
After Bulevar disbanded in 1982, Cukić started writing for Rock magazine and other Politika publications. As a journalist for Rock, Cukić interviewed Dire Straits, Uriah Heep, Saxon, Sting, Tina Turner, Bananarama, Kim Wilde, Cheap Trick, Matchbox, Yazoo, Gap Band, Samson and other acts.

Cukić returned to journalism in late 1990s, starting to write about Serbian rock scene for Beocity.com website. He was one of the editors of the magazine Žica (Wire) and an editor at music television TV Metropolis. He was a host of Radio Beograd 202 show Sport 'n' Roll, Radio B92 show Volim ponedeljak (I Like Monday), and Radio Laguna show Nedelja veče sa Dejanom Cukićem (Sunday Evening with Dejan Cukić). Since 2020, he is hosting the show Ode ponedeljak (There Goes Monday) at Radio Beograd 202. He was also a screenwriter for Radio Television of Serbia music show Tri boje zvuka (Three Colors of Sound). During the 2000s and early 2010s, he occasionally contributed to Politikin Zabavnik magazine. From 2009 to 2012 he wrote a column entitled Dok se još sećam (While I Still Remember) for Popboks webzine.

=== Literary career ===
In 2001, Cukić published his book about life and work of Frank Zappa, entitled Muzika je najbolja (Music Is the Best). His book Rolingstonsi – uputstvo za upotrebu (The Rolling Stones – the Manual) was published in 2007. The book entitled 45 obrtaja: Priče o pesmama (45 Revolutions: Stories about Songs), compiled from his articles originally appearing in Politikin Zabavnik, was published during the same year. Cukić also authored the monograph about Serbian Association of Jazz, Pop and Rock Musicians, entitled 70 godina Udruženja muzičara džeza, zabavne i rok muzike (70 Years of the Association of Jazz, Pop and Rock Musicians), published in 2023.

=== Translating career ===
In 2008, Cukić started collaborating with the publishing house Laguna as a translator. For Laguna, he has translated a number of biographies and autobiographies of popular musicians into Serbian:

- The Autobiography by Eric Clapton (2008);
- Black Celebration (Depeche Mode biography) by Steve Malins (2009);
- When Giants Walked the Earth: A Biography of Led Zeppelin by Mick Wall (2009)
- Bowie: A Biography by Marc Spitz (2011);
- Life by Keith Richards (co-translated with Goran Skrobonja, 2011);
- Mick: The Wild Life and Mad Genius of Jagger by Christopher Andersen (2014);
- The Beatles: The Authorised Biography by Hunter Davies (2014);
- Dancing with Myself by Billy Idol (2016);
- Pigs Might Fly: The Inside Story of Pink Floyd by Mark Blake (2017)
- Born to Run by Bruce Springsteen (2017);
- Is This the Real Life: The Untold Story of Queen by Mark Blake (2019);
- Being John Lennon – A Restless Life by Ray Connolly (2019);
- Me by Elton John (2020);
- Being Elvis – A Lonely Life by Ray Connolly (2020);
- Two Riders Were Approaching: The Life & Death of Jimi Hendrix by Mick Wall (2020);
- No One Here Gets Out Alive by Jerry Hopkins and Danny Sugerman (2021);
- Let Love Rule by Lenny Kravitz with David Ritz (2022).

Cukić has also translated Legends of Rock by Ernesto Assante, published by DataStatus in 2019.

=== Other activities ===
In 1986, Cukić played one of the leading roles in the TV film Poslednja priča (The Last Story), with screenplay by David Albahari and directed by Miloš Petrović. For the film, he recorded the song "Kako te želim" ("How I Want You"). The song was released on a promo single in 444 copies for the needs of the film's presentation at Monte-Carlo Television Festival. Cukić also acted in 1988 TV rock opera Kreatori i kreature (Creators and Creatures), directed by Vladimir Milančić, and in 1990 TV film Ljubav je hleb sa devet kora (Love Is a Nine-Layer Bread), directed by Stanko Crnobrnja.

In 2011, Cukić became a contestant in the TV Pink reality show Dvor (The Castle), his participation in the show causing mostly negative reactions from the rock community in Serbia. He was voted out of the show after four weeks. In a 2022 interview, Cukić stated about his participation in the show: "There's a long story, and a short story, and I always choose [to tell] the short story: money. I had financial problems at the time. [...] It [participating in the show] was a completely unnecessary experience, and I totally understand why people are asking me this question. I probably could have gotten by without it, but sometimes one just falls into panic. From today's point of view, it wasn't big money, but it was one of those situations where you find yourself owing money to a lot of people, having eleven mortgages and debts to friends. And that becomes terribly burdensome, and then someone appears offering you a lot of money just to sit somewhere. And that solves a problem, which, as I said, from today's point of view doesn't seem that big, but it's one of those problems which is like a rolling snowball that turns into an avalanche".

== Legacy ==
In 2011, Cukić's version of the song "A šta da radim" was polled, by the listeners of Radio 202, one of 60 greatest songs released by PGP-RTB/PGP-RTS during the sixty years of the label's existence.

== Discography ==
=== With Bulevar ===
==== Studio albums ====
- Loš i mlad (1981)
- Mala noćna panika (1982)

==== Singles ====
- "Moje bezvezne stvari" / "Nemam ništa više važno da te pitam" (1980)
- "Nestašni dečaci" / "Moja lova, tvoja lova" (1981)

=== With Bajaga i Instruktori ===
==== Studio albums ====
- Pozitivna geografija (1984)
- Sa druge strane jastuka (1985)
- Jahači magle (1986)

=== Solo ===
==== Studio albums ====
- Spori ritam (1987)
- Zajedno (1989)
- 1991 (1991)
- 4 ½... Ja bih da pevam... (1996)
- Igramo na ulici (1998)
- Divlji med – Pesme Boba Dilana (2000)
- Kalendar (2002)
- Ubrzanje! (2008)
- Ulica bez brojeva (2019)

==== Live albums ====
- Unplugged (1997)
- DC & SRB @ SC (2003)

==== Compilation albums ====
- San na pola puta (1992)
- Priče o ljubavi (2014)
- Greatest Hits Collection(2019)

== Bibliography ==
- Muzika je najbolja (2001)
- The Rolling Stones – Uputstvo za upotrebu (2007)
- 45 obrtaja: Priče o pesmama (2007)
- 70 godina Udruženja muzičara džeza, zabavne i rok muzike (2023)
