= Prodavnica tajni =

Studio album by Bajaga i Instruktori
- Released: 1988
- Recorded: Studio M, Studio 1 Radio Novi Sad, Novi Sad; Autumn 1988
- Genre: Pop rock; folk rock
- Label: PGP-RTB
- Producer: Saša Habić

Bajaga i Instruktori chronology
Jahači magle (1986)	Prodavnica tajni (1988)	Neka svemir čuje nemir (1989)

Professional ratings
Review scores
Source	Rating
Ritam	5/5 stars
Muzika.hr (2010 reissue review)	4.5/5 stars

Prodavnica tajni (trans. The Shop of Secrets) is the fourth studio album from Serbian and former Yugoslav rock band Bajaga i Instruktori, released in 1988.

The album was polled in 1998 as the 79th on the list of 100 greatest Yugoslav rock and pop albums in the book YU 100: najbolji albumi jugoslovenske rok i pop muzike (YU 100: The Best albums of Yugoslav pop and rock music).

== Background and recording ==
In 2008, the band's frontman Momčilo Bajagić stated that he worked on the songs during his vacation in Thailand, during the band's Soviet Union tour, and in Belgrade. Prodavnica tajni was recorded in Radio Novi Sad studios, because, as Bajagić stated, the pressure of journalists was too big in Bajaga i Instruktori homecity Belgrade.

The album was named after Dino Buzzati book La boutique del mistero. Bajagić stated that he liked the book, but that the songs had no connection with it.

Prodavnica tajni marked a slight stylistic change in the band's sound: the songs were simpler, without brass instruments, frequent on the band's previous releases, based on acoustic guitars and keyboards, and the songs "Plavi safir", "Vesela pesma", "Život je nekad siv, nekad žut" and "Ruski voz" featured folk music elements.

== Track listing ==
No.	Title	Lyrics	Music	Length
1.	"Gore-dole" ("Up-Down")	M. Bajagić	M. Bajagić	3:50
2.	"Plavi safir" ("Blue Sapphire")	M. Bajagić	M. Bajagić	4:40
3.	"Verujem - Ne verujem" ("I Believe - I don't Believe")	M. Bajagić	M. Bajagić	3:20
4.	"Godine prolaze" ("Years Are Passing By")	M. Bajagić	M. Bajagić	3:43
5.	"Ruski voz" ("Russian Train")	M. Bajagić	M. Bajagić, Ž. Milenković	4:09
6.	"Vesela pesma" ("Merry Song")	Ž. Milenković	Ž. Milenković	3:33
7.	"Tišina" ("Silence")	M. Bajagić	M. Bajagić	4:50
8.	"Život je nekad siv, nekad žut" ("Life Is Sometimes Grey and Sometimes Yellow")	M. Bajagić	M. Bajagić, Ž. Milenković	3:49
9.	"Od kada tebe volim" ("Since I've Been in Love With You")	M. Bajagić	M. Bajagić	3:58

== Personnel ==
- Momčilo Bajagić - vocals, guitar, acoustic guitar, arranged by
- Žika Milenković - vocals, arranged by
- Miroslav Cvetković - bass guitar, backing vocals, arranged by
- Saša Lokner - keyboards, backing vocals, arranged by
- Nenad Stamatović - guitar, backing vocals
- Vladimir Golubović - drums, backing vocals, arranged by

=== Additional personnel ===
- Branko Mačić - jazz guitar
- Davor Rodik - guitar
- Vlada Negovanović - guitar
- Bata Božanić - bass guitar
- Saša Dragić - backing vocals, executive producer
- Saša Habić - producer, arranged by
- Jan Šaš - recorded by
- Ivica Vlatković - recorded by (tracks: 2, 8)
- Miša Đurić - technician

== Reception and legacy ==
The album was well received by the fans, with virtually every song on the album becoming a hit. It was sold in more than 360,000 copies.

The album was polled in 1998 as the 79th on the list of 100 greatest Yugoslav rock and pop albums in the book YU 100: najbolji albumi jugoslovenske rok i pop muzike (YU 100: The Best albums of Yugoslav pop and rock music).

Serbian critic Dimitrije Vojnov named Prodavnica tajni one of ten most important albums in the history of former Yugoslav rock, stating however, that with Prodavnica tajni "the most charming band in Yugoslavia went in a gloomy direction, and despite the fact that the band delivered some of their best songs, like 'Otkada tebe volim', on the album, it was obvious that they are going towards kafana [...] stopping by at ethnic music, again, not in their urban and charming way, but following the Oriental sound which is popular in kafanas. From this point, which initially was not seen as alarming, as Prodavnica tajni was a legitimate pop product, Bajaga's energy seemed to dry up. It was like 'Ruski voz' woke up something inside him and the audience, something after which nothing would be the same again".

In 2008, Bajagić himself stated that he considers Prodavnica tajni one of three best Bajaga i Instruktori albums, and that he would make no changes if he recorded the album today.

== Cover versions ==
- Serbian punk rock band Trula Koalicija recorded a cover of "Tišina", with altered lyrics and entitled "Alkoholičarka", on their 1992 album Plakao sam kad je pala Sekuritatea.
- Serbian eurodance group Tap 011 recovered a mashup of "Plavi safir" and "Muzika na struju" ("Electric Music"), the latter from Bajaga i Instruktori 1993 album Muzika na struju, releasing it, under the title "Muzika na safir" ("Sapphire Music") on their 1996 album Gaće (Underpants).
- Polish rock vocalist Maciej Maleńczuk covered the Verujem ne verujem song from the album alongside Warsaw-based recording act Yugopolis 2, as Ostatnia nocka.
