= Neizbrisano =

Compilation album by Bajaga i Instruktori
- Released: 1997
- Genre: Pop rock
- Length: 36:16
- Label: Biveco

Bajaga i Instruktori chronology
| Od bižuterije do ćilibara (1997) | Neizbrisano (1997) | Zmaj od Noćaja (2001) |

Neizbrisano (trans. Unerased) is a compilation album from Serbian and former Yugoslav rock band Bajaga i Instruktori, released in 1997.

The album featured remixed songs from the 1991 EP Četiri godišnja doba, the instrumental "Radovan III", written by Momčilo Bajagić for the play of the same name, a cover of Buldožer song "Yes My Baby, No" entitled "Tribute to Buldožer", a new version of "Moji drugovi" (originally released on Bajagić's solo album Ni na nebu ni na zemlji) featuring Vlada Divljan, the Sokoli cover of Bijelo Dugme song "Ne spavaj, mala moja" featuring Bajagić on vocals, and previously unreleased songs "Montenegro" and "Januar" ("January").

== Track listing ==
1. "Buđenje ranog proleća" - 4:36
2. "Dobro jutro" - 3:33
3. "Uspavanka" - 3:31
4. "U koži krokodila" - 3:00
5. "Tribute to Buldožer" - 4:00
6. "Januar" - 3:35
7. "Radovan III" - 4:08
8. "Montenegro" - 3:23
9. "Moji Drugovi" - 3:35
10. "Ne spavaj mala moja" - 5:22
