= Bajaga =

Serbian rock musician

- Бајагa
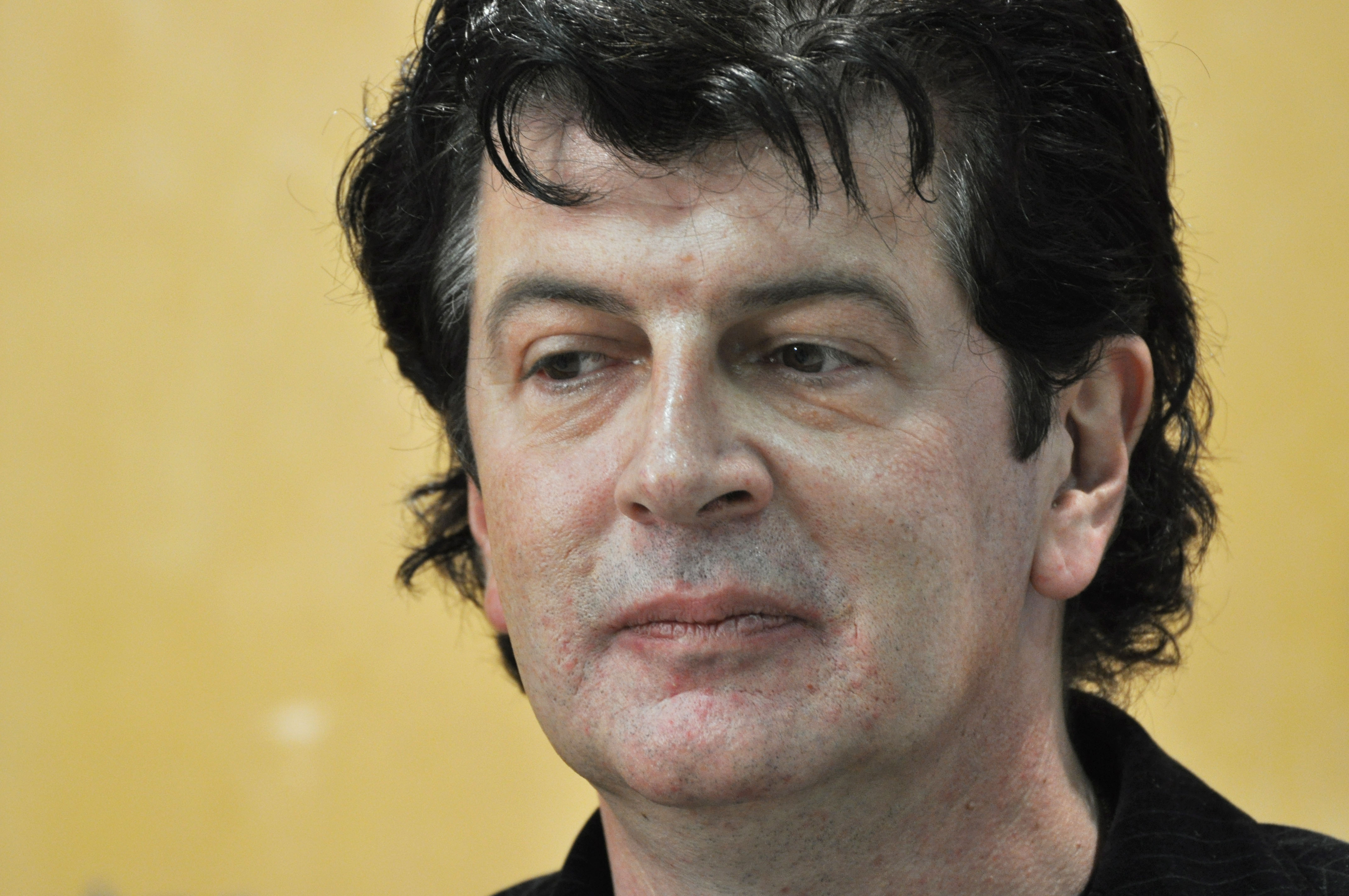
- Bajaga in 2009
- Born: Momčilo Bajagić; 19 February 1960 (age 66); Bjelovar, PR Croatia, Yugoslavia
- Citizenship: Serbia; Croatia
- Occupations: Singer; songwriter; musician
- Years active: 1975–present
- Musical career
- Genres: Hard rock; pop rock; post-punk
- Instruments: Guitar; vocals
- Label: Jugoton
- Member of: Bajaga i Instruktori
- Formerly of: Riblja Čorba

Momčilo Bajagić (Serbian Cyrillic: Момчило Бајагић; born 19 February 1960), better known by his nickname Bajaga (Serbian Cyrillic: Бајага), is a Serbian rock musician. Bajagić is best known as the frontman of Serbian and former Yugoslav rock band Bajaga i Instruktori, as well as a former member of rock band Riblja Čorba.

== Career ==
=== Early years ===
Bajagić started his musical activity as a singer in a band called TNT. He wrote his first lyrics, song "Dvadeseta noć" ("Twentieth Night"), as a member of this band.

After TNT disbanded in 1976, Bajagić joined Ofi, a band led by organist Toma "Ofinger" Stojković.

After Stojković left the group, Bajagić and the remaining two Ofi members—drummer Dragan "Đera" Đerić and vocalist Živorad "Žika" Milenković—formed Glogov Kolac (Hawthorn Stake) together with guitarist Rajko Kojić. The band's debut live performance, in the Banat village of Izbište, turned out to be their last as Glogov Kolac disbanded too. Seventeen-year-old Bajagić then turned down Boban Petrović's invitation to join his disco-funk act Zdravo, while Kojić joined the band S.O.S. and eventually Riblja Čorba.

=== Riblja Čorba ===
In 1978, on a suggestion from Rajko Kojić (by then lead guitarist in Riblja Čorba), Bajagić was invited to audition for the recently formed band as they had decided to add a rhythm guitarist in order to tighten the sound. Bajagić recorded six albums with Riblja Čorba. He wrote songs "Ja sam se ložio na tebe" ("I Was Crushing on You"), "Baby, Baby I Don't Wanna Cry", "Muzičari koji piju" ("Musicians Who Drink") and "Kad hodaš" ("When You're Walking"). He co-wrote the songs "Dva dinara, druže" ("Two Dinars, Comrade"), "Nemoj srećo, nemoj danas" ("Don't Honey, Not Today"), "Kazablanka" ("Casablanca"), "Evo ti za taksi" ("Here's Some for the Cab"), "Draga, ne budi peder" ("Honey, Don't Be a Faggot"), "Dobro jutro" ("Good Morning"), "Odlazak u grad" ("Going to the City"), "Srećan put, pišo moja mala" ("Have A Nice Trip, My Little Winky"), and others.

Pozitivna geografija

During his work with Riblja Čorba, Bajagić wrote a number of humorous pop rock songs that did not fit into the band's hard rock sound and decided to release a solo album. He recorded the album Pozitivna geografija (Positive Geography) with musicians who would later become members of his band Bajaga i Instruktori: vocalist Dejan Cukić (a former Dizel, Tilt and Bulevar member), bass guitarist Miroslav "Cvele" Cvetković (a former Tilt, Pop Mašina and Papatra member), guitarist Nenad Stamtović (a former Tilt, Zebra, Suncokret and Bulevar member) and drummer Vladimir Golubović (a former Tilt, Suncokret and Riblja Čorba member). The album was produced by Kornelije Kovač and was released in late January 1984, bringing hits "Limene trube" ("Brass Trumpets"), "Tekila gerila" ("Tequila Guerilla"), "Mali slonovi" ("Little Elephants"), "Marlena", and "Pustite me, druže" ("Let Me Go, Comrade"). Although released as Bajagić's solo album, Pozitivna geografija was later included in Bajaga i Instruktori official discography, as it featured future Bajaga i Instruktori members. Bajagić and the musicians that were involved in the album recording performed in Kulušić club in Zagreb on 12 April 1984, and on 21 April in Dom Sindikata in Belgrade, appearing as Bajaga i Instruktori (Bajaga and the Instructors) for the first time at the latter concert.

At the time of the album recording, Bajagić wanted to remain a member of Riblja Čorba, but the popularity of his songs caused conflicts inside the band. In July 1984 he was, alongside Kojić, excluded from Riblja Čorba, and started a tour with his new band.

=== Bajaga i Instruktori ===
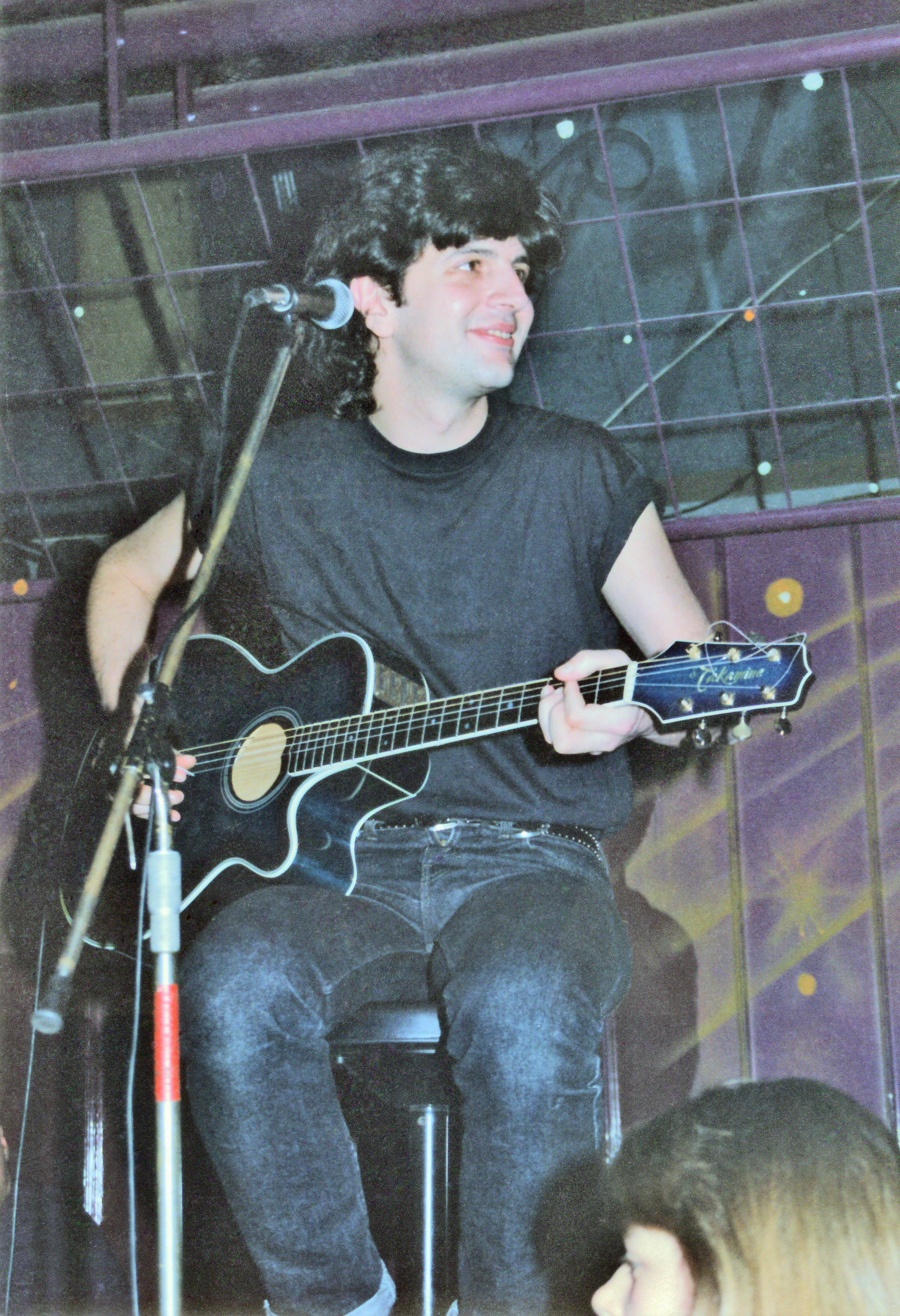
Bajaga performing in the late 1980s in Niš.

Led by Bajagić, Bajaga i Instruktori became one of the most successful and influential rock bands of the former Yugoslav and Serbian rock scene. Their string of albums in the mid-to-late 1980s placed them at the very top of the former Yugoslav rock scene, alongside other mega-selling bands such as Bijelo Dugme and Riblja Čorba. The band has released nine studio albums (including Pozitivna geografija).

=== Solo works ===
Bajagić released two solo albums, both featuring film soundtracks written by him: Ni na nebu ni na zemlji (for the film of the same name) and Profesionalac – Muzika iz filma (for the film The Professional). Bajagić recorded the latter with pop rock/folk rock band Apsolutno Romantično.

=== Album production ===
Bajagić produced Bezobrazno Zeleno debut album BZ1 released in 1983. He also produced Heroji's only album, 88 in 1988, He produced his solo album Profesionalac – Muzika iz filma, and participated in the production of Bajaga i Instruktori releases Četiri godišnja doba (Four Seasons, released in 1991) and Muzika na struju (Electric Music, released in 1993).

== Personal life ==
Bajagić completed primary and secondary education in Belgrade. In 1989, he married Emilija Stoletović, two years his junior (then employee of Embassy of Burma in Belgrade). They have two children together, a son Marko and a daughter Anđela. They divorced in 2022, after 33 years of marriage.

In 2004, Bajagić acquired Croatian citizenship.

Bajagić was elected member on five-year term of the Red Star Assembly Crvena zvezda Basketball Club on 27 December 2021.

== Awards ==
In 2021 he was awarded the Order of Karađorđe's Star.

== Discography ==
=== With Riblja Čorba ===
==== Studio albums ====
- Kost u grlu (1979)
- Pokvarena mašta i prljave strasti (1981)
- Mrtva priroda (1981)
- Buvlja pijaca (1982)
- Večeras vas zabavljaju muzičari koji piju (1984)

=== Live albums ===
- U ime naroda (1982)

=== With Bajaga i Instruktori ===
- Pozitivna geografija (1984)
- Sa druge strane jastuka (1985)
- Jahači magle (1986)
- Prodavnica tajni (1988)
- Muzika na struju (1993)
- Od bižuterije do ćilibara (1997)
- Zmaj od Noćaja (2001)
- Šou počinje u ponoć (2005)
- Daljina, dim i prašina (2012)
- U sali lom (2018)
- Ovaj svet se menja (2020)

=== Solo ===
==== Soundtrack albums ====
- Ni na nebu ni na zemlji (1994)
- Profesionalac – Muzika iz filma (2003)
- Darja - Muzika iz filma "Hotel Beograd" (2020)

== Bibliography ==
- EX YU ROCK enciklopedija 1960–2006, Janjatović Petar; ISBN 978-86-905317-1-4
