= Jahači magle =

Studio album by Bajaga i Instruktori
- Released: September 6, 1986
- Recorded: Studio V PGP-RTB, Belgrade; June 15 - August 3, 1986
- Genre: Pop rock
- Length: 39:15
- Label: PGP-RTB
- Producer: Saša Habić

Bajaga i Instruktori chronology
Sa druge strane jastuka (1985)	Jahači magle (1986)	Prodavnica tajni (1988)

Jahači magle (trans. Fog Riders) is the third studio album from Serbian and former Yugoslav rock band Bajaga i Instruktori, released in 1986.

The album, produced by Saša Habić, featured numerous guests: Josipa Lisac on backing vocals, Jane Parđovski (of Jakarta), Vlada Negovanović, Duda Bezuha, and Rajko Kojić (Momčilo Bajagić's former bandmate from Riblja Čorba) on guitar, Đorđe Petrović on keyboards, and others. It was also the last Bajaga i Instruktori album recorded with vocalist Dejan Cukić, who left the band after the tour which followed the album release to pursue a solo career.

The song "Samo nam je ljubav potrebna" features a quotation from the Beatles song "All You Need Is Love".

The album was polled in 1998 as the 58th on the list of 100 greatest Yugoslav rock and pop albums in the book YU 100: najbolji albumi jugoslovenske rok i pop muzike (YU 100: The Best albums of Yugoslav pop and rock music).

== Track listing ==
All songs written by Momčilo Bajagić, except where noted.

1. "Ja mislim 300 na sat" ("I Think 300 Per Hour") – 4:41
2. "Kao ne zna da je gotivim" ("Like She Doesn't Know I Like Her") – 3:48
3. "Gde stiže moje sećanje" ("Where Does My Memory Go") – 4:26
4. "Red i mir" ("Law And Order") – 2:57
5. "Rimljani" ("Romans") - 4:18
6. "Samo nam je ljubav potrebna" ("We Just Need Love") (Ž. Milenković, M. Bajagić, Lennon-McCartney) – 3:54
7. "Strah od vozova" ("Fear Of Trains") – 5:34
8. "Bam, bam, bam" – 5:10
9. "442 do Beograda" ("442 'Till Belgrade") – 4:42

== Personnel ==
- Momčilo Bajagić - guitar, vocals, arranged by
- Dejan Cukić - vocals
- Žika Milenković - guitar, vocals
- Miroslav Cvetković - bass guitar, backing vocals
- Nenad Stamatović - guitar
- Saša Lokner - keyboards
- Vladimir Golubović - drums, percussion, arranged by

=== Additional personnel ===
- Jane Parđovski - guitar (on track 2)
- Vlada Negovanović - guitar (on tracks: 3, 8)
- Rajko Kojić - guitar (on track 7)
- Duda Bezuha - guitar (solo on track 7)
- Nenad Stefanović - bass guitar (on track 2)
- Slobodan Božanić - fretless bass
- Nenad Nesa Petrović - saxophone
- Goran Grbić - trumpet
- Đorđe Petrović, keyboards (on track 5), backing vocals (on track 5)
- Josipa Lisac - backing vocals (on track 1)
- Nera - backing vocals (on tracks: 2, 4)
- Saša Habić - producer, handclaps (on track 9)
- Kornelije Kovač - arranged by (track 5)

== Reception and legacy ==
The album's biggest hits were "Ja mislim 300 na sat", "Rimljani", "Samo nam je ljubav potrebna", "Bam, bam, bam", and "442 do Beograda".

The album was polled in 1998 as the 58th on the list of 100 greatest Yugoslav rock and pop albums in the book YU 100: najbolji albumi jugoslovenske rok i pop muzike (YU 100: The Best albums of Yugoslav pop and rock music).

Due to the positive reaction by the audience and Bajaga i Instruktori themselves, Amajlija also performed on the Jahači magle tour, during which, due to a quarrel, the band disbanded.

== Covers ==
- Serbian pop duo Next of Kin covered the song "Strah od vozova" on their 1990 album Way to the Top.
