= Daljina, dim i prašina =

Studio album by Bajaga i Instruktori
- Released: June 6, 2012
- Genres: Pop rock; jazz
- Label: Long Play
- Producer: Vojislav Aralica

Bajaga i Instruktori chronology
Šou počinje u ponoć (2005)	Daljina, dim i prašina (2012)

Professional ratings
Review scores
Source	Rating
Balkanrock.com	3/5 stars
City Magazine	3/5 stars
Dobre Vibracije	8/10 stars
Glas.ba	(favorable)
Muzika.hr	2.5/5 stars
Slobodna Bosna	(favorable)
ZliHadzo.com	3.5/5 stars

Daljina, dim i prašina (trans. Distance, Smoke and Dust) is the ninth studio album from Serbian rock band Bajaga i Instruktori, released in 2012.

Daljina, dim i prašina album was released with the book of Bajagić's poetry entitled Vodič kroz snove (Guide through Dreams). The book featured a selection of lyrics Bajagić had written for Bajaga i Instruktori and his solo albums, as well as for other artists, and for all the songs from Daljina, dim i prašina. The album features two bonus tracks: the rerecorded version of the song "Bežiš od mene, ljubavi" (originally released as a single in 2008), and a radio edit of the song "Još jednom". As of May 2013, according to Bajagić, the album was sold in circa 30,000 copies.

In August 2013, Daljina, dim i prašina was released on vinyl, in a limited number of 200 copies only, each one signed by Bajagić.

== Track listing ==
All songs written by Momčilo Bajagić.

No.	Title	Length
1.	"Daljina, dim i prašina" ("Distance, Smoke and Dust")	3:31
2.	"Suza" ("A Tear")	3:37
3.	"Mala uska haljina" ("Little Tight Dress")	3:43
4.	"Vreme" ("Time")	4:18
5.	"Ako treba da je kraj" ("If It Should Be the End")	5:40
6.	"Stari put za Novi Sad" ("Old Road to Novi Sad")	4:08
7.	"Od sumraka do svitanja" ("From Dusk till Dawn")	3:54
8.	"Još jednom" ("One More Time")	8:21
9.	"Bežiš od mene, ljubavi" ("You're Running Away from Me, My Love")	3:26
10.	"Još jednom (Radio Edit)"	5:44

== Personnel ==
- Momčilo Bajagić - vocals, electric guitar, acoustic guitar, harmonica
- Miroslav Cvetković - bass guitar - backing vocals
- Saša Lokner - keyboards, organ
- Žika Milenković - backing vocals, acoustic guitar
- Čeda Macura - drums, backing vocals
- Marko Nježić - electric guitar, backing vocals

=== Additional personnel ===
- Vojislav Aralica - production, electric guitar, acoustic guitar, bass guitar, keyboards, programming
- Miloš Nikolić - trumpet, trombone, horn (tracks: 2, 8)
- Dejan Momčilović - drums (tracks: 4, 5)
- Marko Kuzmanović - drums (track 2)
- Igor Malešević - drums (track 7)
- Ivan Aleksijević - piano, organ (track 2)
- Alesandar Radojčić - percussion (track 8)
- Demonja Nikola - tenor saxophone (track 2)
- Nikola Vranjković - solo guitar (track 4)
- Davor Rodik - slide guitar (track 6)
- Nevena Filipović - backing vocals (track 5)
- Bojana Račić - backing vocals (track 5)
- Jadranka Kristof - backing vocals (tracks: 2, 9)
- Darija Hodnik - backing vocals (tracks: 2, 9)
- Ivana Čabraja - backing vocals (tracks: 2, 9)
- Dragan Brnaš - backing vocals (track 9)
- Vladimir Pavelić - backing vocals (track 9)
- String of Life Quartet
  - Hemnalina Milešković - violin
  - Aleksandra Klenkovski - violin
  - Milica Mihailović - viola
  - Ana Dulović - cello
- Kornelije Kovač - string arrangements
