= Pozitivna geografija =

Studio album by Bajaga
- Released: 30 January 1984
- Recorded: November–December 1983
- Studio: Momčilo Bajagić's apartment, Belgrade; Studio V PGP-RTB, Belgrade
- Genre: Pop rock; world
- Label: PGP-RTB
- Producer: Kornelije Kovač

Bajaga chronology
Pozitivna geografija (1984)	Ni na nebu ni na zemlji (1994)

Bajaga i Instruktori chronology
Pozitivna geografija (1984)	Sa druge strane jastuka (1985)

Pozitivna geografija (Serbian Cyrillic: Позитивна географија, lit. 'Positive Geography') is the 1984 debut album by the Serbian rock musician Bajaga. Originally released as Bajaga's solo album, the album was later included in the official discography of the Serbian and former Yugoslav band Bajaga i Instruktori, as Bajaga recorded it with musicians which he would later form the band with.

The album was polled in 1998 as the 37th on the list of 100 greatest Yugoslav rock and pop albums in the book YU 100: najbolji albumi jugoslovenske rok i pop muzike (YU 100: The Best albums of Yugoslav pop and rock music).

== Background and recording ==
At the time of the album recording, Momčilo "Bajaga" Bajagić was still a member of the hard rock band Riblja Čorba. His intention was to record a large number of songs he wrote and release them on an album, without leaving Riblja Čorba.

The songs were recorded during November and December 1983, in a rented apartment and in PGP-RTB's Studio V, with a help in production by Kornelije Kovač. The musicians that participated in the album recording which would later become a member of Bajaga i Instruktori, were Dejan Cukić (formerly of Bulevar, vocals), Miroslav Cvetković "Cvele" (formerly of Pop Mašina, bass guitar), Nikola Stamatović (formerly of Zebra, Suncokret, and Bulevar, guitar), and Vladimir Golubović (drums). Bajagić himself sung and played guitar on the album. The album also featured Nenad Stefanović "Japanac" on bass guitar, Dragan Jovanović "Krle" (formerly of Generacija 5) on guitar, Kire Mitrev (of KIM) on trombone, Suzana Petričević on vocals (on the song "Papaline", which was her singing debut), Ivan Švager on clarinet, Borislav Pavićević "Longa" on backing vocals, and the album producer Kornelije Kovač on keyboards and backing vocals, with the rhythm machine programming also done by him.

== Track listing ==
All songs written by Momčilo Bajagić.

Pozitivna geografija
No.	Title	Length
1.	"Berlin"	2:25
2.	"Mali slonovi" ("Little Elephants")	2:17
3.	"Poljubi me" ("Kiss Me")	3:02
4.	"Limene trube" ("Brass Trumpets")	2:40
5.	"Znam čoveka" ("I Know a Man")	2:48
6.	"Tekila - Gerila" ("Tequila - Guerila")	3:32
7.	"Marlena"	3:03
8.	"Kosooka" ("Slant-eyed Girl")	3:21
9.	"Tamara"	3:24
10.	"Pustite me, druže" ("Let Me Go, Comrade")	2:38
11.	"Papaline" ("Sprats")	2:00

== Compositions ==
In 2009, in an interview to journalist Aleksandar Arežina, Bajagić commented on the songs:

=== "Berlin" ===
"My dad was a Partisan when he was 16, from 1943 to 1944. He was a kid, and they were really into going to Berlin. But, as they travelled mostly by foot, by the time they reached some place in Austria, Berlin fell. The time when the song was written was years before the fall of the Berlin Wall, so, back then it had a completely different meaning."

=== "Mali slonovi" ===
"It is like it's written for kids, but I didn't write it as a children's song, although maybe it will be remembered as one."

=== "Poljubi me" ===
"It's my first good recording. I don't mean as a song, but as a recording. [...] It's one of the best songs from the album."

=== "Limene trube" ===
"I wanted to have a punk tune. So we made the trumpets sound a little steamed [...] The lyrics 'people are running away, people are leaving', I don't know why I wrote them back then. Certainly, something was in the air..."

=== "Znam čoveka" ===
"The lyrics are about a neighborhood friend of mine, from Zemun. He was a drummer, and he died a long time ago."

Although not stated in this interview, Bajagić mentioned on other occasions that the song was dedicated to Dragan "Đera" Đerić, his former bandmate from the bands Ofi and Glogov Kolac.

=== "Tekila - Gerila" ===
"At the time, there was a lot of talking about Sandinistas, a lot of fuss in Colombia, Peru [...] For me, 'Tekila - Gerila' was a nice way of seeing those things. Besides, I wanted a good excuse to do Latin music."

=== "Marlena" ===
"At the time I loved Lou Reed, and that sort of rock, and 'Marlena' sounded good with Marlene Dietrich. So, since we already had a 'Berlin', let's also have a 'Marlena'."

=== "Kosooka" ===
"Exotic. We wanted to have that to. It's the only song I'm not satisfied with. Back then, I thought I was so smart, so I thought you could make a song with only one chord, E sharp. [Kornelije Kovač] asked me 'Can't we use couple more chords', and I was like 'No, no, no! This is great, we're gonna do something completely minimalistic'."

=== "Tamara" ===
"'Tamara' had been written way before I would eventually visit Russia. I made a lot of [geographical] mistakes in the lyrics. Neva and Hermitage are in Leningrad, and Bolshoi Theatre is in Moscow. Tamara couldn't possibly live in both Leningrad and Moscow. The Russians didn't complain, though, they thought it was cute. Spira thought we could find a [local] chick to say something, anything, in Russian. But we couldn't find one with a good enough accent. [...] Spira then remembered that river level reports on [Serbian] radio are read out in Russian (among other languages), every day. So we recorded the radio announcer chick reading a water level report! So in 'Tamara' you can hear that 'the Danube is this high in Bezdan, and that high in some other place'."

=== "Pustite me, druže" ===
"The oldest song on the album. I did it while the rest of the guys from [Riblja] Čorba were in the army. I didn't know what to do with myself, however, I had a sideband, Frka, with [Miroslav Cvetković]. We were given some time at Enco Lesić's [Druga Maca studio], so we recorded the song, and it even ended up being played on the Rokenroler show. I also heard that it was considered for inclusion on Paket aranžman—and I don't know who ultimately made those sorts of decisions—but apparently me being a guitarist in [a popular and nationally-known] Riblja Čorba prevailed [as they decided to go with unknown Belgrade acts]. [The song itself] is about an everyday experience of a long-haired teenager in Belgrade."

=== "Papaline" ===
"I didn't know Suzana Petričević before that. Spira said that he had a friend who can sing. The song was a joke [...] 'Papaline' (Serbo-Croatian for 'sprats') were funny to people from Belgrade as well as to people from Zagreb. [...] The idea of the song was that all love songs are 'slimy and disgusting', so I thought about what could be small and slimy."

== Personnel ==
- Momčilo Bajagić - guitar, vocals

=== Future members of Bajaga i Instruktori ===
- Dejan Cukić - backing vocals
- Miroslav Cvetković - bass guitar, backing vocals
- Nenad Stamatović - guitar
- Vladimir Golubović - drums, percussion

=== Others ===
- Kornelije Kovač - producer, keyboards, drum programming, backing vocals
- Suzana Petričević - vocals (on "Papaline")
- Nenad Stefanović - bass guitar
- Dragan Jovanović - guitar
- Kire Mitrev - trombone
- Ivan Švager - clarinet
- Borislav Pavićević - backing vocals
- Zoran Radetić - recorded by

== Reception and legacy ==
The album was well received by both audience and the critics, with "Berlin", "Mali slonovi", "Limene trube", "Poljubi me" "Tekila - Gerila", "Marlena" and "Tamara" all becoming huge hits. The album marked Bajagić's breakthrough, as a solo artist, with 400,000 copies sold. He initially did not want to perform songs from the album live but was persuaded to hold several concerts. He and some of the musicians who participated on the recording (including producer Kornelije Kovač) held their first concert on April 12, 1984, in Zagreb club Kulušić. On April 21, they (without Kovač) performed in Belgrade's Dom Sindikata, performing as Bajaga i Instruktori (after the idea of the journalist Peca Popović) for the first time. The concert was well visited (mostly by teenagers) and the band's performance was well received.

The success Bajagić had with his songs caused conflicts inside Riblja Čorba, and in July, he was excluded from the band. He continued his career as the leader of Bajaga i Instruktori.

In 1998, the album was polled as the 37th on the list of 100 greatest Yugoslav rock and pop albums in the book YU 100: najbolji albumi jugoslovenske rok i pop muzike (YU 100: The Best albums of Yugoslav pop and rock music).
