= Zmaj od Noćaja (album) =

Studio album by Bajaga i Instruktori
- Released: 5 October 2001
- Recorded: Studio V PGP-RTS, Belgrade; May - July, 2001
- Genre: Pop rock; electronic rock
- Label: PGP-RTS
- Producer: Saša Habić

Bajaga i Instruktori chronology
Neizbrisano (1997)	Zmaj od Noćaja (2001)	Best of Live (2002)

Zmaj od Noćaja is the seventh studio album from Serbian rock band Bajaga i Instruktori, released on 8 October 2001. The name of the album refers to the name of a street in Belgrade. The street itself was named after Stojan Čupić, also known as Zmaj od Noćaja (Dragon of Noćaj), a hero from the First Serbian Uprising.

Zmaj od Noćaja featured a bonus CD entitled I ja sam Zvezdaš (I'm a Red Star Fan, Too), which featured three versions of the song "Zvezda", dedicated to the football club Red Star Belgrade.

The album featured a cover of The Clash song "Should I Stay or Should I Go", entitled "Da li da odem ili ne".

== Track listing ==
1. "Lepa Janja, ribareva kći" ("Beautiful Jana, The Fishermans' Daughter") – 3:41
2. "Da li da odem ili ne" ("Should I Stay Or Should I Go") – 3:02
3. "Gospod brine" ("The Lord Cares") – 5:50
4. "Tehno blues" – 4:18
5. "Zmaj od Noćaja" ("The Dragon From Noćaj") - 5:43
6. "Najslađa devojka" ("The Cutest Girl") – 3:34
7. "Model 1960" – 4:03
8. "Ala" ("How") – 3:41
9. "Perla" ("Bead") – 3:45
10. "Extasy pazi!!!" ("Extasy, Look Out!!!") – 3:10
11. "Plavo" ("Blue") – 3:27

=== I ja sam zvezdaš bonus CD ===
1. "Zvezda" ("Star") - 4:13
2. "Zvezda (Stadionska verzija)" ("Star (Stadium Version)") - 4:17
3. "Zvezda (Matrica)" ("Star (Instrumental)") - 4:11

== Personnel ==
- Momčilo Bajagić - vocals, guitar
- Žika Milenković - vocals, guitar
- Miroslav Cvetković - bass guitar, backing vocals
- Saša Lokner - keyboards, arranged by
- Ljubiša Opačić - guitar, backing vocals, programming, arranged by
- Čeda Macura - drums, backing vocals

=== Additional personnel ===
- Marijana Popović - vocals
- Ivan Ilić - trombone
- Jovan Ilić - harmonica
- Magnifico - voice (on track "Extasy pazi!!!")
- Shatzi - voice (on track "Extasy pazi!!!")
- Saša Habić - producer, arranged by, guitar, keyboards
- Zoran Vukčević - engineer
