= Bajaga i Instruktori =

Serbian rock band

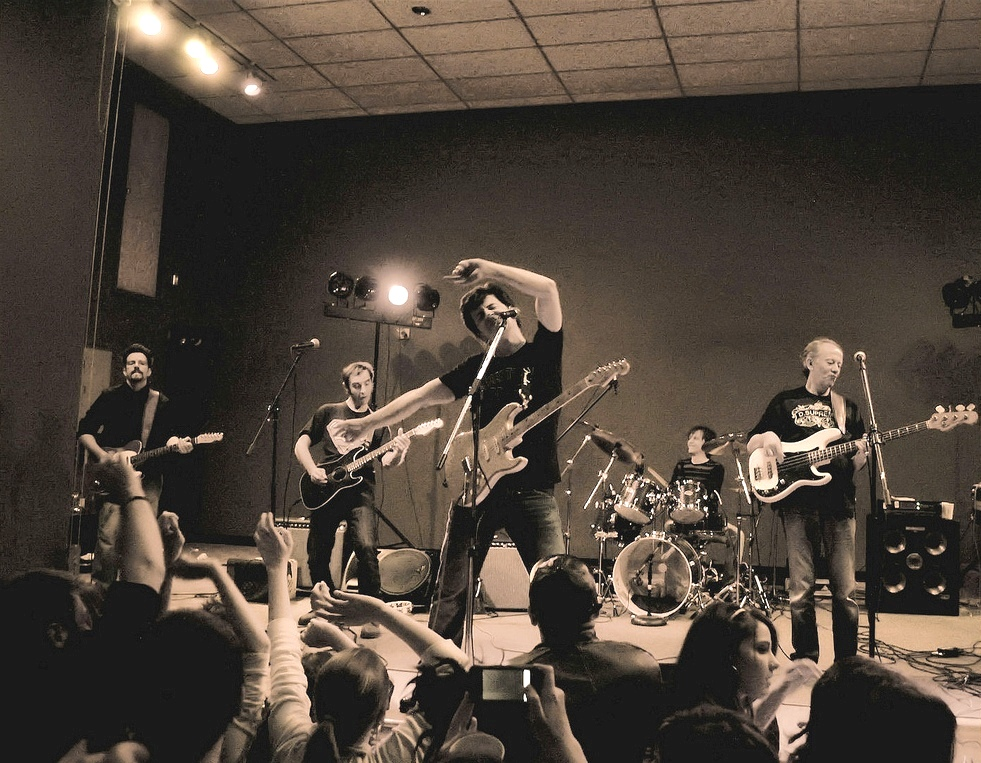
- Bajaga i Instruktori performing live in 2009

Background information
- Origin: Belgrade, Serbia
- Genres: Rock; pop rock; folk rock
- Years active: 1984–1994; 1996–present
- Labels: PGP-RTB, Diskoton, Red Luna Records, Produkcija Stig, PGP-RTS, Komuna, Biveco, Dallas Records, Metropolis Records, Hi-Fi Centar, Take It Or Leave It Records, Long Play
- Spinoff of: Riblja Čorba
- Members: Momčilo Bajagić; Živorad Milenković; Aleksandar Lokner; Marko Nježić; Vladimir Čukić; Marko Kuzmanović
- Past members: Dejan Cukić; Nenad Stamatović; Miroslav Cvetković; Vladimir Golubović; Vladimir Negovanović; Čedomir Macura; Ljubiša Opačić
- Website: www.bajaga.com

Bajaga i Instruktori (Serbian Cyrillic: Бајага и Инструктори; trans. Bajaga and the Instructors) are a Serbian and Yugoslav rock band formed in Belgrade in 1984. Founded and led by vocalist, guitarist and principal composer and lyricist Momčilo Bajagić "Bajaga", the group is one of the most notable acts of the Yugoslav rock scene.

The band was formed while Bajagić was still a guitarist for the highly popular band Riblja Čorba, originally to promote Bajagić's side project Pozitivna geografija. The success of the album and the promotional tour led to the continuation of the band's activity. Bajaga i Instruktori's following releases, Sa druge strane jastuka (1985), Jahači magle (1986) and Prodavnica tajni (1988), brought a plethora of hit songs, placing the band at the top of the Yugoslav rock scene, alongside other mega-selling bands like Riblja Čorba and Bijelo Dugme. The band's work and Bajagić's often poetic lyrics were also widely praised by the music critics. The band continued their activity after the breakup of Yugoslavia, throughout their whole career remaining one of the most popular groups in Serbia and other former Yugoslav republics.

== History ==
=== Bajagić's beginnings and career with Riblja Čorba ===
Momčilo Bajagić "Bajaga" started his musical career in 1974, at age 14, as vocalist for the band TNT. He wrote his first lyrics as a TNT member, for their song "Dvadeseta noć" ("Twentieth Night"). After TNT disbanded, in the summer of 1976, he moved to the band Ofi, led by organist Toma Stojković, nicknamed "Ofinger" ("Coat Hanger"). The lineup consisted of Stojković on organ, Bajagić on bass guitar, Dragan Đerić "Đera" on drums and Živorad "Žika" Milenković on vocals. After Stojković decided to retire from music, Bajagić and Dragan Đerić formed the band Glogov Kolac (Hawthorn Stake) with organist Dragan Pliško and guitarist Rajko Kojić. The group disbanded after only one live performance, and disappointed Bajagić decided to give up music, refusing an invitation from Zdravo leader Boban Petrović to join his band. However, on the suggestion of Rajko Kojić – who had joined SOS, which had evolved into Riblja Čorba – in 1979 he became rhythm guitarist for Riblja Čorba, which already had gained significant popularity with their debut single, "Lutka sa naslovne strane" ("A Doll on the Front Cover"). With Riblja Čorba Bajagić recorded five studio albums and a live album, writing music and both music and lyrics for several Riblja Čorba hits, achieving nationwide popularity. During his time spent with Riblja Čorba he also produced the debut album of the band Bezobrazno Zeleno.

=== 1980s ===
During his time in Riblja Čorba, Bajagić wrote a large number of humorous pop-oriented songs that did not fit into Riblja Čorba's hard rock sound and social-related lyrics. In 1983 he decided to release these songs on a solo album, starting to work on the album with a group of Belgrade musicians: vocalist Dejan Cukić (a former Dizel, Tilt, and Bulevar member, at the time a journalist for the magazine Rock), bass guitarist Miroslav Cvetković "Cvele" (a former Tilt, Pop Mašina, and Papatra member), guitarist Nenad "Nele" Stamatović (a former Tilt, Zebra, Suncokret, and Bulevar member), and drummer Vladimir "Vlajko" Golubović (a former Tilt and Suncokret member, at the time also playing with Riblja Čorba as a temporary replacement for Miroslav "Vicko" Milatović, who was serving his mandatory stint in the Yugoslav Army). Bajagić originally intended only to record an album of his own songs and to remain a member of Riblja Čorba. The songs for the album were recorded in a rented apartment in Belgrade and in Radio Television Belgrade Studio V and produced by Kornelije Kovač. The album, beside mentioned musicians, featured studio musician Nenad Stefanović "Japanac" on bass guitar, a former Generacija 5 member Dragan "Krle" Jovanović on guitar, KIM leader Kire Mitrev on trombone, jazz musician Ivan Švager on clarinet, and actress Suzana Petričević on vocals. Petričević sung a duet with Bajagić in the song "Papaline" ("Bristlings"). The album, entitled Pozitivna geografija (Positive Geography), was released at the end of January 1984 and was well received by the audience, bringing numerous hits: "Berlin", "Mali slonovi" ("Little Elephants"), "Poljubi me" ("Kiss Me"), "Limene trube" ("Brass Trumpets"), "Tekila gerila" ("Tequila Guerrilla"), "Marlena", and "Tamara". For the opening of the song "Tamara" Bajagić, on the suggestion of musician Dušan Mihajlović "Spira", decided to include a recording of a girl saying several lines in Russian language. However, he was dissatisfied with the accent of all the possible candidates. Eventually, on Mihajlović's suggestion, they used the recording of a girl reading report on Danube water level on Radio Belgrade. The album featured the anti-drug song "Znam čoveka" ("I Know a Man"), dedicated to Dragan Đerić "Đera", Bajagić's former bandmate from Ofi and Glogov Kolac.

Initially, Bajagić had no intention of promoting Pozitivna geografija in concert, but eventually decided to listen to the advice of fellow musicians and music journalists and hold several concerts. Bajagić and musicians working on the album held their first concert in Zagreb club Kulušić on 12 April 1984. Beside the musicians that worked on the album, the concert also featured vocalist Žika Milenković (a graduate from Belgrade Faculty of Applied Arts, Bajagić's former bandmate from the band Ofi, a former Mačori member and an actor in the amateur theatre Teatar levo), keyboardist Dragan Mitrić (a former Bulevar and Propaganda member) and Kornelije Kovač, Milenković soon becoming an official member of the band. During their staying in Zagreb, Bajagić and Cukić appeared as guests on the recording of Parni Valjak album Uhvati ritam (Get into the Rhythm), singing backing vocals on the title track, as a sign of gratitude to Parni Valjak for lending them a piece of drum kit for their first concert. The band held the official album promotion, organized by the Rock magazine, in Belgrade's Trade Union Hall on 21 April. On this performance the band appeared under the name Bajaga i Instruktori – chosen after the idea of journalist Peca Popović – for the first time. The concert featured Valentino and Bezobrazno Zeleno as the opening bands. The concert was well attended and the band's performance was well received by the teenage audience.

The success of Bajagić's solo album intensified already existing problems and conflicts inside Riblja Čorba. On 19 July 1984 Bajagić was, alongside Rajko Kojić, excluded from the band. During the summer of 1984 Bajaga i Instruktori went on a tour, with experienced musician Rade Radivojević on keyboards, playing mostly at youth work actions. At the end of the year, in the Rock magazine Bajagić was proclaimed the Rock Musician of the Year, and Pozitivna geografija was voted the Album of the Year by fellow musicians.

At the beginning of 1985 Bajaga i Instruktori recorded the album Sa druge strane jastuka (On the Other Side of the Pillow), co-produced by Kornelije Kovač and Saša Habić. The album featured a large number of guests: jazz veterans Stjepko Gut on trumpet and flugelhorn, Jovan Maljoković on saxophone and Mića Marković on saxophone, young jazz musicians Branko Mačić on jazz guitar and Sava Medan on double bass, Nenad Stefanović "Japanac" on bass guitar, Dragan "Krle" Jovanović on guitar. Sa druge strane jastuka was the band's first album to feature Milenković as an author: he co-wrote the song "Francuska ljubavna revolucija" ("French Love Revolution") with Bajagić. The album brought hits "220 u voltima" ("220 Volt"), "Vidi šta sam ti uradio od pesme, mama" (a Serbo-Croatian cover of the Melanie Safka song "Look What They've Done to My Song Ma"), "Ti se ljubiš (Na tako dobar način)" ("You Kiss (In a great Manner)"), "Dvadeseti vek" ("Twentieth Century"), and ballads "Dobro jutro, džezeri" ("Good Morning, Jazzers"), "Sa druge strane jastuka" and "Zažmuri" ("Close Your Eyes"). The jazz tune "Dobro jutro, džezeri" was partially inspired by the time the band had spent with Belgrade jazzers in Belgrade Youth Center jazz club and would eventually become a jazz standard in Yugoslavia. The band chose "Zažmuri" as a single for the music chart TV show Hit meseca (Hit of the Month), much to dissatisfaction of the editors of their record label, PGP-RTB, who insisted on a fast-tempo song. "Zažmuri" eventually climbed to the top of the Hit meseca chart. The album was promoted with a 7-inch single with "220 u voltima" as the A-side. On the record's B-side was a track with software for ZX Spectrum entitled "Kompjuterska informacija (za Sinclair Spectrum)" ("Computer Information (for Sinclair Spectrum)").

In March 1985 Bajaga i Instruktori presented their new songs to the Zagreb audience in Kulušić club, as a part of the BG-ZG: Bolje vas našli (Belgrade-Zagreb: Happy to Be Here) action. Several days later, on the night of 9–10 March, they performed in Toulouse on the Night of Mediterranean Rock festival. Although they performed around 4:00 am, they were well received and performed three encores. After this concert Rade Radivojević was replaced by a former Potop (The Flood) and Galija member Saša Lokner. The band went on a successful Yugoslav tour, on which they held two concerts in Tašmajdan Stadium, on 8 and 9 June. For both of the concerts the Stadium was sold out, and on the first one the band played during pouring rain. In May 1985 Bajagić and Cukić took a part in YU Rock Misija, a Yugoslav contribution to Live Aid, and on 15 June Bajaga i Instruktori performed on the YU Rock Misija concert held on the Red Star Stadium.

Members of Bajaga i Instruktori and Bijelo Dugme together in Moscow, July 1985

In the autumn of 1985 Bajaga i Instruktori and Bijelo Dugme represented Yugoslavia on the 12th World Festival of Youth and Students held in Moscow. The two bands should have held their first concert on 28 July in Gorky Park. The soundcheck, during which Yugoslav technicians played Bruce Springsteen and Pink Floyd songs, attracted some 100,000 people to the location. Bajaga i Instruktori opened the concert, however, after some time, the police started to beat the ecstatic audience, and the concert was interrupted by the Soviet officials, so Bijelo Dugme did not have the opportunity to go out on the stage. Fearing new riots, the Moscow authorities scheduled the second concert in Dinamo Hall, and the third one in the Moscow Green Theatre. The first one, held on 30 July, was attended by about 2,000 uninterested factory workers, and the second one, held on 2 August and also featuring British bands Misty in Roots and Everything but the Girl, by about 10,000 young activists with special passes. During their staying in Moscow, Bajaga i Instruktori also performed in Pioneers Home and Vakhtangov Theatre.

After the group returned to Yugoslavia, they continued Sa druge strane jastuka tour, during which they held more than 120 concerts. During the year they also performed on the rock evening of the Intertalent Festival in Prague. At the end of 1985 in the magazine Rock Bajaga i Instruktori were polled by the critics the Rock Band of the Year, Bajagić was polled the Rock Musician of the Year, "Zažmuri" was polled the Song of the Year, and Sa druge strane jastuka was polled the Album of the Year. By the end of the year the album was sold in more than 350,000 copies, Bajaga i Instruktori becoming one of best-selling Yugoslav acts and teen idols. At the end of the year the band was awarded with the 25 May Plaque by the League of Communist Youth of Yugoslavia. After the tour ended, the band went on a break, during which Lokner and Golubović performed in jazz clubs with jazz musicians Stjepko Gut (trumpet), Miša Krstić (piano) and Nenad Petrović (saxophone).

In the summer of 1986 the band members reunited to record the album Jahači magle (Fog Riders). The album, produced by Saša Habić, featured numerous guests: Josipa Lisac on vocals in "Ja mislim 300 na sat" ("I Think at 300 kmph"), Nariman "Nera" Mahmud of Aske on vocals in "Kao ne zna da je gotivim" ("Like She Doesn't Know I Like Her"), Kornelije Kovač on keyboards, Bata Božanić on fretless bass, Duda Bezuha on guitar, Bajagić's former bandmate from Riblja Čorba Rajko Kojić on guitar, Vlada Negovanović on guitar, Jane Parđovski of Jakarta on guitar, Goran Grbić on trumpet and Đorđe Petrović on keyboards. The album cover was designed by renowned painter Radovan Hiršl. To promote the album, the band recorded a cover of The Beatles song "All You Need Is Love", entitled "All You Need Is Love (verzija 1986)" ("All You Need Is Love (Version 1986)"), which was released on a 7-inch single given as a gift with an issue of Rock magazine. The B-side featured audio clips from the Jahači magle songs. The single was printed in 99,999 copies, which was the circulation of Rock magazine. After the single, the album was released, bringing hits "Ja mislim 300 na sat", "442 do Beograda" ("442 to Belgrade"), with a bass guitar riff written by Bata Božanić, "Bam, bam, bam", "Rimljani" ("Romans"), and Milenković's "Samo nam je ljubav potrebna" ("All We Need Is Love"). The band went on a successful tour, which ended with a concert held at Belgrade Fair on 22 November 1986 in front of about 20,000 people. After the end of the tour, the band made a break once again, during which Bajagić travelled to Thailand, and Cukić released his first solo album, Spori ritam (Slow Rhythm). After the break, Bajaga i Instruktori went on a two-month Soviet Union tour, during which they held 42 concerts. After they returned to Yugoslavia, Cukić left Bajaga i Instruktori conventionally, forming his Spori Ritam Band.

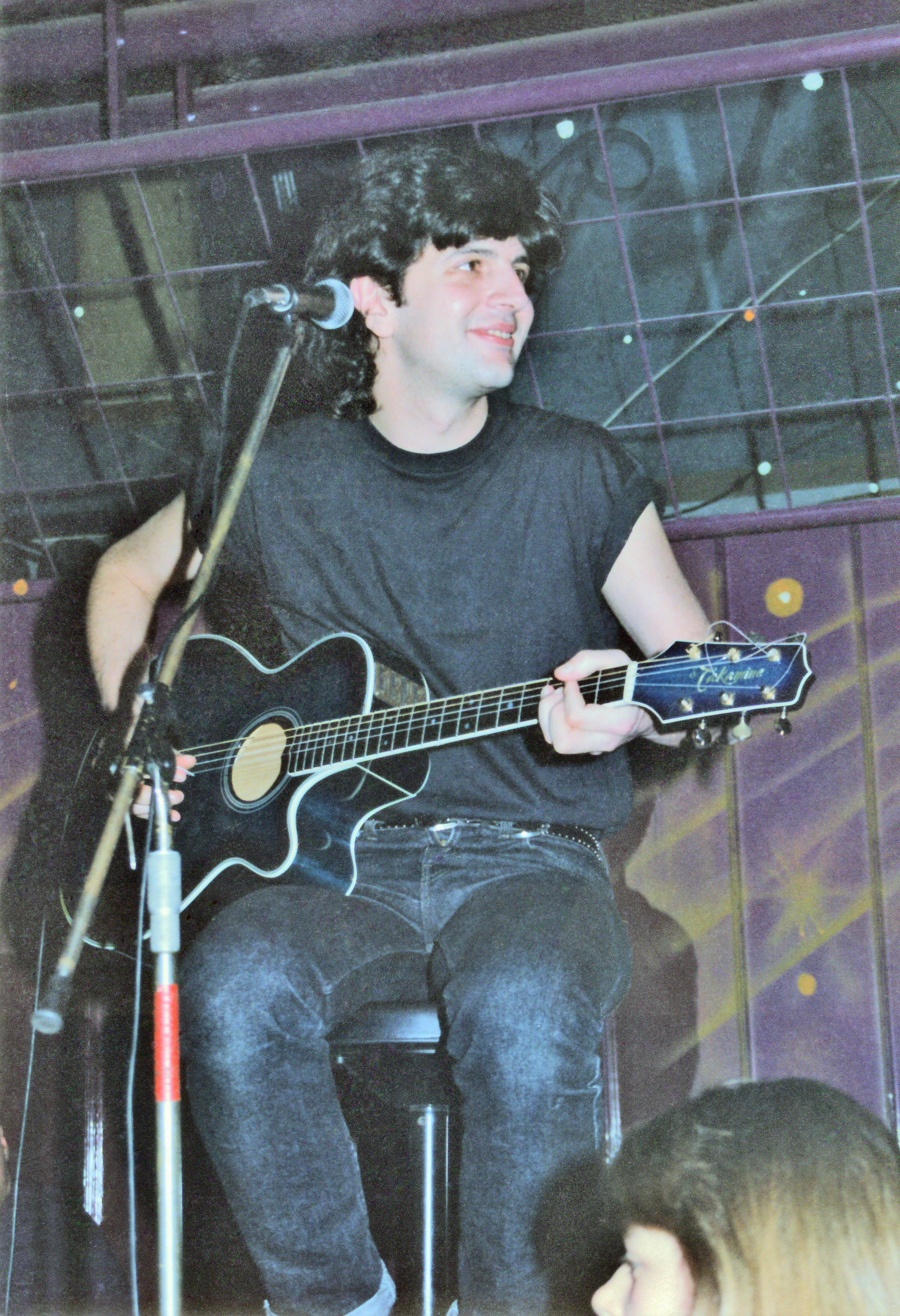
Momčilo Bajagić performing in Niš during late 1980s.

Bajaga i Instruktori recorded their following album, Prodavnica tajni (The Shop of Secrets), in 1988 in Novi Sad. The album, named after Dino Buzzati book La boutique del mistero (with the songs, however, having no connection with the book), was produced by Saša Habić. Milenković co-wrote the songs "Ruski voz" ("Russian Train"), "Život je nekad siv – nekad žut" ("Life Is Sometimes Grey – Sometimes Yellow"), and "Vesela pesma" ("Merry Song"). The album marked a slight stylistic change in the band's sound: the songs were simpler, without brass instruments and numerous guest musicians, frequent on the band's previous releases, based on acoustic guitars and keyboards, and the songs "Plavi safir" ("Blue Sapphire"), "Vesela pesma", "Život je nekad siv – nekad žut" and "Ruski voz" featured folk music elements. However, virtually every song on the album became a hit. During the year Bajagić also found time to produce the album 88 by the band Heroji.

The band went on another successful tour, during which they recorded the double live/compilation album Neka svemir čuje nemir (May the Universe Hear the Unrest). The album featured new songs "Na vrhovima prstiju" ("On the Tips of Your Toes"), "Idem (Kao da ne idem, a idem)" ("I'm Going (Like I'm not Going, but I'm Going")), the first Bajaga i Instruktori song sung entirely by Milenković, and "Neka svemir čuje nemir", a cover of a traditional Indian song. It also featured acoustic studio versions of "Tamara" and "Tekila gerila". The live recordings were made on the band's concerts in Zagreb's House of Sports, held on 6 March 1989, and on Novi Sad EBU Rock Festival, with the recording of the journalist Dražen Vrdoljak announcing the band on their concert in Kulušić, held on 8 December 1984. The album also featured a live version of the song "Kad hodaš", written by Bajagić and originally recorded by Riblja Čorba. During the tour that followed the album release, the band held two sold-out concerts in Belgrade's Pionir Hall. Despite the growing nationalism, the band was well-accepted in all parts of Yugoslavia. The only incident on the tour happened in Split, where the fans of the football club Hajduk Split threw various objects on the stage, but after the intervention of the security, the concert was continued. At the beginning of 1990 Bajaga i Instruktori, alongside Yugoslav acts Riblja Čorba, Valentino, Viktorija and Galija and several less known British acts, performed in Timișoara, Romania, at the three-day concerts organized two months after the Romanian Revolution. All five Yugoslav acts performed on three concerts in Timișoara Olympia Hall in front of some 20,000 people each night.

=== 1990s ===
In 1991 the band released the EP Četiri godišnja doba (Four Seasons), which featured the songs "Uspavanka" ("Lullaby"), "Buđenje ranog proleća" ("Awakening of the Early Spring"), "Dobro jutro" ("Good Morning"), and "U koži krokodila" ("In Crocodile Skin"). The EP featured guest appearance by opera singer Jadranka Jovanović. During 1992, despite the outbreak of the Yugoslav Wars, Bajaga i Instruktori performed and held successful concerts in Serbia, Montenegro, Macedonia and Slovenia. During the same year Milenković, with Električni Orgazam member Goran Čavajda, Riblja Čorba member Zoran Ilić, and a former Bezobrazno Zeleno member Bojan Vasić, formed the supergroup Babe.

In 1993 Bajaga i Instruktori released the album Muzika na struju (Electric Music). The song "Marinina tema" ("Marina's Theme") was originally written by Bajagić for the theatre play Život Jovanov (Life of Jovan) directed by Darko Bajić, and the theme "Nakostrešena mačka" ("Bristled Cat") was written by Milenković. The anti-war ballad "Golubica" ("Dove") featured Aleksandra and Kristina Kovač, Tanja Jovićević of Oktobar 1864 and Marija Mihajlović on backing vocals. The song was based on the instrumental Bajagić played at Terazijska česma during the 9 March 1991 protest. Beside "Golubica", the album featured anti-war songs "Gde si" ("Where Are You") and "Ovo je Balkan" ("This Is the Balkans"). The album was promoted on concerts in Montenegro and Macedonia, and on a sold-out concert in Sports Hall in Belgrade. After the album release, Bajagić started to perform alone in the clubs abroad, with the audience usually consisting of young people who emigrated from former Yugoslav republics. At the beginning of 1994 Bajaga i Instruktori announced their performances in Slovenia, with a huge interest of the audience for these concerts. However, Slovenian authorities refused to issue visas to the band, which caused a scandal in Slovenian media. After the intervention of the Slovenian president Milan Kučan, visas were issued to the members of the band, and they performed several concerts including a sold-out concert in Ljubljana's Tivoli Hall. In March 1994 the band held three concerts in Belgrade's Trade Union Hall, with which they celebrated ten years of existence.

In November 1994, after a concert in Pristina, the existing conflicts – caused by Bajagić's solo performances abroad and by the change in management – erupted. Bajagić excluded Stamatović and Golubović from the group, which led to Bajaga i Instruktori ending their activity. At the time Bajagić, with Lokner, wrote music for Miša Radivojević's film In the Middle of Nowhere. The recordings featured members of the old town music band Legende, in the hit song "Moji drugovi" ("My Friends"), Dragan Jovanović "Krle" of Generacija 5 on acoustic guitar, Sava Latinović on tarabuka, and Aleksandra and Kristina Kovač on backing vocals. The music was released on the album Ni na nebu ni na zemlji (In the Middle of Nowhere). During the same year Bajagić wrote music for the TV show Otvorena vrata (Opened Door), and Lokner recorded the instrumental music album Naos (Cella) with keyboardist Laza Ristovski.

In 1996 Bajagić reformed Bajaga i Instruktori. The new lineup, beside Bajagić, Žika Milenković on vocals and guitar, Miroslav Cvetković on bass guitar, and Saša Lokner on keyboards, featured the guitarist Vlada Negovanović (a former member of Butik, Doktor Spira i Ljudska Bića, Slađana Milošević's backing band, Tunel, and Dejan Cukić's Spori Ritam Band), and the drummer Čedomir "Čeda" Macura (a former member of Neverne Bebe, Viktorija's backing band, Legija and Revolveri). At the end of 1996 the band recorded the album Od bižuterije do ćilibara (From Bijouterie to Amber). Bajagić wrote all the songs for the album, except "Ne volim zimu" ("I Don't Like Winter"), featuring music written by Milenković. The album was produced by the band members themselves, and featured Saša Habić on cello. The album brought hits "Silikon (2004)" ("Silicon (2004)"), Tvoja je gajba sigurna" ("Your Place Is Safe"), "Još te volim" ("I Still Love You"), "Iza nas..." ("Behind Us..."), "Ne volim zimu", and "Što ne može niko možeš ti" ("You Can Do What Nobody Else Can"). The album was promoted with a free concert held in Belgrade's Republic Square on 12 May 1997.

In 1997 Slovenian record label Biveco released the compilation album Neizbrisano (Unerased). The album featured recordings from the various periods of Bajagić's and Bajaga i Instruktori career. It featured previously unreleased songs "Montenegro" and "Januar" ("January"), remixed songs from the Četiri godišnja doba EP, the instrumental "Radovan III", written for the play of the same name, "Tribute to Buldožer", which was a cover of Buldožer song "Yes My Baby, No", a new version of "Moji drugovi", featuring Vlada Divljan, and Sokoli cover of Bijelo Dugme song "Ne spavaj, mala moja" ("Don't You Sleep, Baby") featuring Bajagić and Boris Bele of Buldožer. During the same year journalist Ivan Ivačković published a book about the band entitled Obe strane jastuka (Both Sides of the Pillow).

=== 2000s ===
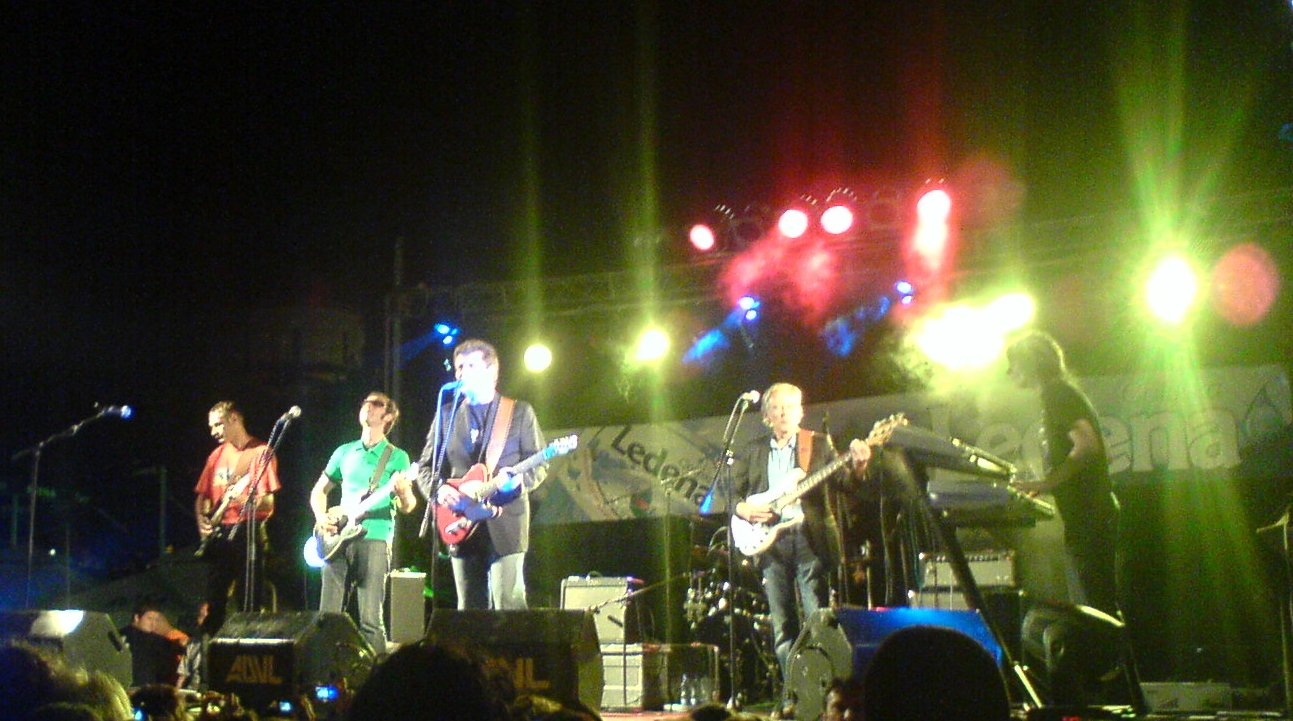
Bajaga i Instruktori performing live in Sokobanja in 2008

In 2000 Bajagić took an active role in Democratic Opposition of Serbia rallies preceding the overthrow of Slobodan Milošević. In 2001 the band released the album Zmaj od Noćaja (Dragon of Noćaj), recorded with the new guitarist, Ljubiša "Buba" Opačić (previously a member of several less-known bands), and produced by Saša Habić. It featured a cover of The Clash song "Should I Stay or Should I Go", entitled "Da li da odem ili ne". The album brought the hits "Zmaj od Noćaja" and "Lepa Janja, ribareva kći" ("Pretty Janja, the Fisherman's Daughter"), as well as minor hits "Da li da odem ili ne" and "Ala" ("Ala"). Zmaj od Noćaja featured a bonus CD entitled I ja sam Zvezdaš (I'm a Red Star Fan, Too), which featured three versions of the song "Zvezda" ("Star"), dedicated to the football club Red Star Belgrade.

In 2002 the band released the album Best of Live, which featured recordings from their concerts in Belgrade, Ljubljana, Zagreb, Timișoara, Skopje and Niš. It featured two previously unrecorded songs: "Slovenačka reč" ("A Word in Slovenian"), recorded live and sung by Milenković, featuring music from the band's old song "Idem (Kao da ne idem, a idem)" and Slovenian language lyrics written by journalist Sonja Javorik, and "Pesna protiv maleri" ("A Song against Bad Luck"), recorded in studio for the theatre play Kutrite mali hrčki (Poor Little Hamsters) by Skopje Drama Theatre and sung by Bajagić, featuring Macedonian language lyrics. In 2003 Bajagić, with the members of the band Apsolutno Romantično, recorded the soundtrack for Dušan Kovačević's film The Professional, released on the album Profesionalac: Muzika iz filma (The Professional: Music from the Film). During the same year, the band released the compilation album Ruža vetrova Beograda (Belgrade Wind Rose), which, after the idea of journalist Peca Popović, featured the band's songs inspired by the city of Belgrade. The compilation included two new songs, "Novosti" ("The News") and "Ruža vetrova" ("Wind Rose"). The album was promoted on a concert in the building of Belgrade Philharmonic Orchestra on 27 December 2003. During 2003 the band performed in Split, Croatia, for the first time after the outbreak of Yugoslav Wars. The band performed on the city summer stage, and on three occasions tear gas was thrown over the fence into the audience. Despite the interruptions, the band finished the concert, after four encores. In 2004 Lokner released the solo album entitled Evropa Electro Exprees (Europe Electro Express).

In 2005 the band released the album Šou počinje u ponoć (The Show Begins at Midnight), produced by Voja Aralica. Most of the songs were written by Bajagić, with Milenković composing only the song "Pod jasenom" ("Under the Ash tree"). The album featured numerous guests: folk singer Vida Pavlović (who died soon after the recording, before the album release) in the song "Padaj kišo, keve ti" ("Fall, Rain, Please"), Negative frontess Ivana Pavlović on vocals in the song "Funky Taxi", Bebi Dol on vocals in "Bademi i so" ("Almonds and Salt") and "Pesma slobode" ("The Song of Freedom"), Marko Đorđević on trumpet, Orthodox Celts member Ana Đokić on violin and the ethnic music band Vrelo. The song "Pesma slobode" is a Serbian language cover of Bob Marley & The Wailers' "Redemption Song". A tour and a release of a live DVD recorded at a concert in the Belgrade Arena followed the album release. In 2008 the band recorded two new songs: "Bežiš od mene ljubavi" ("You're Running Away from Me, My Love") and "A ti se nećeš vratiti" ("And You're not Coming Back"), the latter featuring guest appearance by Plavi Orkestar frontman Saša Lošić, for the TV show Vratiće se rode (The Storks Will Be Back).

On 28 September 2008 Opačić died in Maribor, in a hotel room after the band's concert. He was replaced by former VROOM guitarist Marko Nježić.

In December 2009 the band celebrated 25 years of existence with three concerts held in Belgrade's Sava Centar. During the same year they performed in the United States, in Boston, New York City (in Cooper Union Great Hall), Montreal, San Francisco, Los Angeles and Chicago, and director Miloš Jovanović recorded a documentary about the band entitled Muzika na struju.

=== 2010s ===
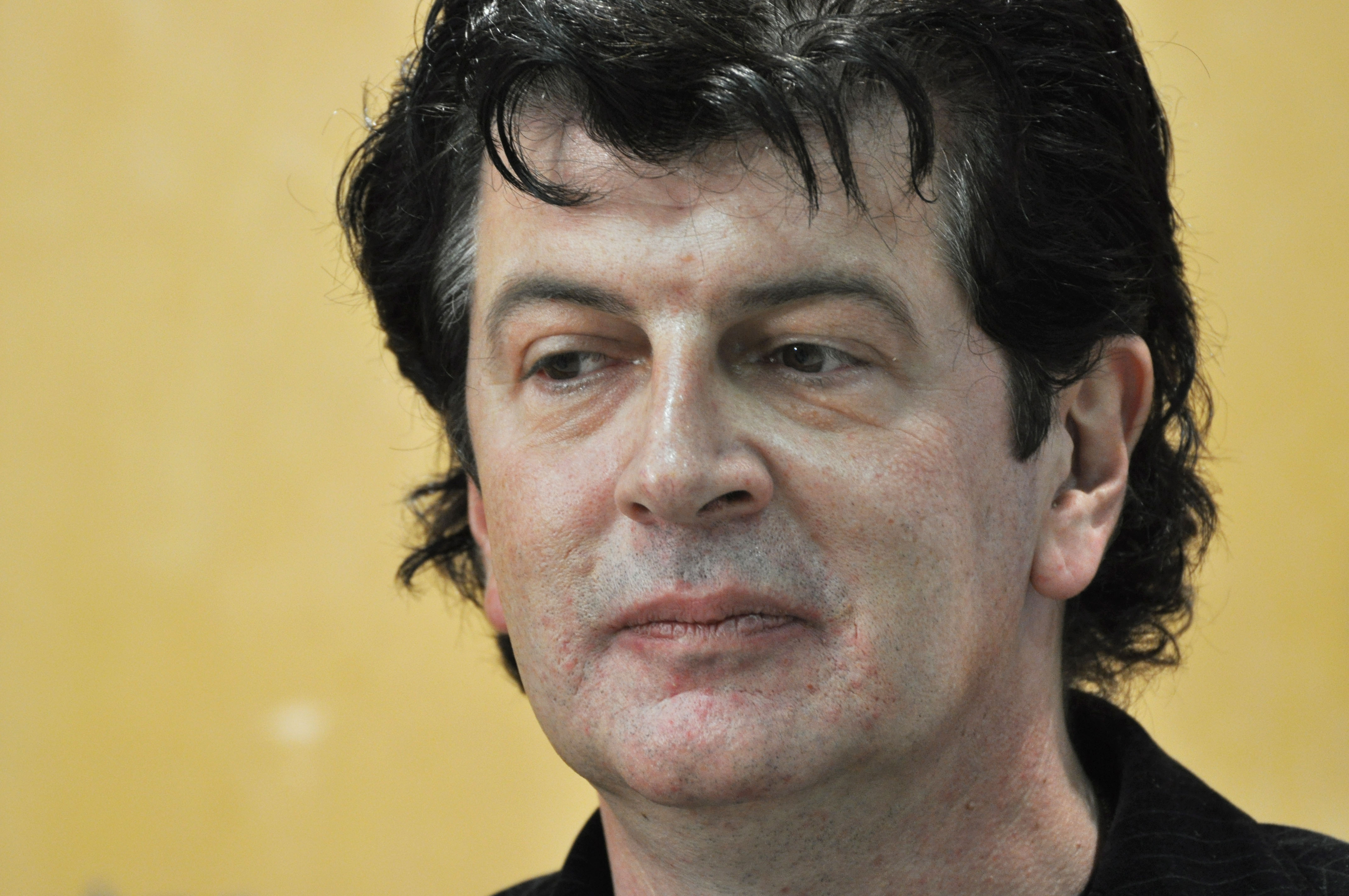
Bajagić in 2013

In 2010 PGP-RTS released the box set entitled Antologija (Anthology), featuring remastered editions of the first four Bajaga i Instruktori studio albums. On 6 June 2012 the band released the studio album Daljina, dim i prašina (Distance, Smoke and Dust). The album, which ended up selling around 30,000 copies according to frontman Bajaga himself, was announced by the singles "Ako treba da je kraj" ("If It Should Be the End") and "Vreme" ("Time"), and featured a new version of "Bežiš od mene, ljubavi" and a version of the song "Od sumraka do svitanja" ("From Dusk till Dawn"), written by Bajagić and originally recorded by pop singer Karolina Gočeva in 2005. The album was released with the book of Bajagić's poetry entitled Vodič kroz snove (Guide through Dreams). The book featured lyrics Bajagić had written for Bajaga i Instruktori and his solo albums, as well as for other artists, with accompanying texts by playwright and academic Dušan Kovačević, Belgrade University professor Aleksandar Jerkov and journalist Peca Popović. In November the band released the video for the album title track, featuring actor Srđan Todorović.

On 19 April 2013 the band performed in Poland for the first time. The band performed in Proxima Club in Warsaw, and the concert featured guest appearance by Polish singer Maciej Maleńczuk, who, in 2011, covered Bajaga i Instruktori 1988 song "Verujem – Ne verujem" ("I Believe – I Don't Believe"), his version entitled "Ostatnia nocka" ("Last Night"). On 26 June 2013 the band held a concert at Belgrade Kalemegdan Fortress in front of 30,000 spectators, as a part of Daljina, dim i prašina promotional tour. The concert featured Shark, Snakes and Planes, Eva Braun and Bombaj Štampa as the opening bands, and actor and drummer Srđan Todorović, YU Grupa bass guitarist Žika Jelić and Plavi Orkestar frontman Saša Lošić "Loša" as special guests. The concert was preceded by Meet Belgrade from Bajaga's Songs contest organized by Long Play concert agency and Tourist Organization of Belgrade. On 12 June the winners of the contest toured Belgrade with rock journalist Peca Popović, visiting locations mentioned in Bajaga and Instruktori songs, and at Topčider the winners were welcomed by Bajagić. In August 2013 Daljina, dim i prašina was released on vinyl, in a limited number of 200 copies only, each one signed by Bajagić. In 2014 the band started a tour with which they celebrated 30 years since the formation of the band and the release of their debut album. The tour included three concerts in Tvornica kulture in Zagreb, and a concert in 100 Club in London.

In April 2018 Bajaga i Instruktori released their twelfth studio album, U sali lom (Rumpus in the Hall). The album was produced by Saša Habić and post-produced in London's Abbey Road Studios and co-released by PGP-RTS and Croatia Records. It featured Neverne Bebe member Saša Ranđelović "Ranđa" on guitar, singer-songwriter Nikola Vranjković on guitar, Majke member Davor Rodik on pedal steel guitar and Marko Kuzmanović on drums as guests. The album featured the song "Kad mesec prospe rekom srebra sjaj" ("When the Moon Spills Silver Glow over the River"). The song was originally recorded in 2015 for the album Gitarologija: Povratak korenima (Guitarology: Return to the Roots) by Serbian blues rock band Point Blank, with Bajagić and YU Grupa member Dragi Jelić making guest appearances on the song. The lyrics for the song "Noćima sanjam" ("For Nights I've Been Dreaming") were written by Dušan Kovačević. In August 2018 Bajaga i Instruktori concert on the Days of Beer festival in Karlovac, Croatia was cancelled, after protests from the veterans of Croatian War of Independence. Croatian rock band Hladno Pivo was invited as a replacement, but refused to perform as a sign of support for Bajaga i Instruktori. U sali lom was followed by the live album U Puli lom – Live at Arena (Rumpus in Pula – Live at Arena), recorded on the band's concert at Pula Arena on 11 August 2019. The video recording of the concert was released on Blu-ray

=== 2020s ===
In September 2020 the band released their thirteenth studio album, entitled Ovaj svet se menja (This World Is Changing). The album was produced by Saša Habić and co-released by PGP-RTS and Croatia Records. The album featured a new version of the song "Ni na nebu ni na zemlji", a new version of the Otvorena vrata theme song, and a new version of the song "Mladost" ("Youth"), originally written for the theatre play Ženidba i udadba (Marriage), with altered lyrics dedicated to deceased singer-songwriter Arsen Dedić. The album also featured covers of the songs "Tvoje oči" ("Your Eyes") and "Moja draga" ("My Darling"), written by Bajagić and originally recorded by singer Zdravko Čolić, and a cover of "Ja sam se ložio na tebe" ("I Had Hots for You"), written by Bajagić and originally recorded by Riblja Čorba. Ovaj svet se menja featured three new songs: the title track, inspired by COVID-19 pandemic, "Darja", a duet with actor Miloš Biković, and "Kako se to naziva" ("How Do You Call It"), the latter two originally recorded at the beginning of 2020 for the Russian-Serbian film Hotel Belgrade.

In 2021 Bajagić was awarded the Order of Karađorđe's Star by the President of Serbia, Aleksandar Vučić, for his contribution to Serbian culture. During the year the band released the live album Koncert Bajaga I Instruktori – Tašmajdan 2021 (Bajaga i Instruktori Concert – Tašmajdan 2021), recorded on the concert held on Tašmajdan Stadium on 16 July 2021. The album was released in digital form only. During the year Bajagić composed four songs on Dušan Kovačević's lyrics and instrumental music for Kovačević's film Nije loše biti čovek (It's Not Bad to Be Human). The compositions were released on the soundtrack album Nije loše biti čovek, featuring singer and actress Lena Kovačević and actor Gordan Kičić on vocals. In 2022 Croatia Records and PGP-RTS released the double live album Koncert za rock grupu, orkestar i zbor – Sava Centar 2019. Live (Concert for Rock Band, Orchestra and Choir – Sava Centar 2019 Live), recorded on the concert the band held On 6 December 2019 in Sava Centar with the orchestra Beogradski solisti and the choir Lola. The concert was also released on Blu-ray.

In March 2023, Miroslav Cvetković and Čedomir Macura left the band. Cvetković, who was a forming member of the band, stated that he decided to retire from performing due to the fact that he had recently turned 70, while Macura's decision was influenced by the desire to dedicate himself to his new business and spend more time with his family. They were replaced by bass guitarist Vladimir Čukić and drummer Marko Kuzmanović. The new members debuted on two club performances the band held in Belgrade's Bitef Art Cafe at the end of March 2023.

== Legacy ==
In April 1984 we went to a concert in the Trade Union Hall, to check how much a Riblja Čorba guitarist can do on his own, without a leader and a tutor, and left the concert realizing that Momčilo Bajagić flew into our lives to stay. He moved a dose of positivism, not predicted by Orwell for the year 1984, into the space of common intimacy [...]

During 25 years of career, in the business in which the time of the idols passes quickly, despite intense temptations and bad moments, he kept the status of a decent fellow, a beloved musician and a tolerant family guy. In the cruelest days of Yugoslav tsunamis, he helped us keep the most human emotions with romance, cheerfulness and optimism. He protected us from ugly reality with emotional amulets.

Although Bajaga's composing and poetic talents are unquestionable, the critics were reserved towards his vocal capacity, pointing out to monotonous baritone and narrative vocal style of modest range.

However, Bajaga's "impefect voice", as one of the trademarks of domestic music scene, is maybe the most suitable for his complex and descriptive lyrics. His poetry always rose above the trivialities. Those are the lyrics one believes, which one can feel and recognize. With that sort of poetics, he won hearts and respect.

Belgradians share a special attachment to his songs which, in a large extent, symbolize the [Serbian and former Yugoslav] capital. Bajaga is among the chosen Belgrade authors. Just like Vladimir Velmar-Janković, who climbed to the Kalemegdan hill to reveal a deep analysis of men from these lands, just like Dušan Radović, who placed his nest at the top of Beograđanka to foster, watch over and defend the spirit under these skies, just like Momo Kapor, who collected the golden dust of the city while fooling around – Bajaga, in his own time, left originally poetic and colorful image of an emotional pot which is constantly boiling.

— Petar "Peca" Popović in 2011.

In 2015 Serbian jazz singer Lena Kovačević released a tribute album to Bajaga i Instruktori, entitled Džezeri (Jazzers), featuring covers of ten songs by the band. The song "Strah od vozova" ("Fear of Trains") was covered by Serbian pop duo Next of Kin on their 1990 album Way to the Top. The song "Tišina" ("Silence") was, with altered lyrics and entitled "Alkoholičarka" ("Alcoholic Girl"), covered by Serbian punk rock band Trula Koalicija on their 1992 album Plakao sam kad je pala Sekuritatea (I Cried When the Securitate Had Fallen). The song "Francuska ljubavna revolucija" was covered by the Serbian punk rock band Six Pack, their version entitled "La Musique", on their 2004 album Musique, with Žika Milenković making a guest appearance on the song. The song "Ti se ljubiš (Na tako dobar način)" ("You Kiss (In a Great Manner)") was covered by the Serbian pop singer Teodora Bojović on her 2004 album Teodora. The song "Verujem – Ne verujem" was covered in 2011 by Polish singer Maciej Maleńczuk, his version entitled "Ostatnia nocka" ("Last Night"). In 2014, Serbian alternative rock band Bjesovi recorded a medley comprising Bajaga i Instruktori song "Godine prolaze" ("Years Are Passing") and Riblja Čorba song "Užasno mi nedostaje" ("I Miss Her so Much"). In 2020 Serbian rock singers Đorđe David and Ivana Peters released a cover of the song "Gde si". In 2021 Serbian jazz duo Lidija Andonov & Andy Pavlov recorded a cover of "Plavi safir" on their album Mlad & Radostan - Homage to Yugoslav Music from the 80s and Beyond (Young & Joyful - Homage to Yugoslav Music from the 80s and Beyond).

The book YU 100: najbolji albumi jugoslovenske rok i pop muzike (YU 100: The Best albums of Yugoslav pop and rock music), published in 1998, features four Bajaga i Instruktori albums: Sa druge strane jastuka (polled No. 13), Pozitivna geografija (polled No. 37), Jahači magle (polled No. 58), and Prodavnica tajni (polled No. 79). The list of 100 greatest Yugoslav album, published by Croatian edition of Rolling Stone in 2015, features two Bajaga i Instruktori albums, Pozitivna geografija (ranked No. 46) and Sa druge strane jastuka (ranked No. 81). The list of 100 Best Serbian Albums Since the Breakup of SFR Yugoslavia, published in 2021 in the book Kako (ni)je propao rokenrol u Srbiji (How Rock 'n' Roll in Serbia (Didn't) Came to an End), features two Bajaga i Instruktori albums, Muzika na struju (polled No. 34) and Daljina, dim i prašina (polled No. 48)

In 2000, the song "Zažmuri" was polled No. 70 on the Rock Express Top 100 Yugoslav Rock Songs of All Times list. In 2006, the same song was polled No.40 on the B92 Top 100 Domestic Songs list. In 2011, the song "Ti se ljubiš (Na tako dobar način)" was voted, by the listeners of Radio 202, one of 60 greatest songs released by PGP-RTB/PGP-RTS during the 60 years of the labels existence.

The lyrics of 10 songs by the band were featured in Petar Janjatović's book Pesme bratstva, detinjstva & potomstva: Antologija ex YU rok poezije 1967 - 2007 (Songs of Brotherhood, Childhood & Offspring: Anthology of Ex YU Rock Poetry 1967 – 2007).

In 2021, Bajagić was awarded the Order of Karađorđe's Star by the President of Serbia, Aleksandar Vučić, for his contribution to Serbian culture.

== Members ==
- Momčilo Bajagić – vocals, guitar (1984–present)
- Žika Milenković – guitar, vocals (1984–present)
- Saša Lokner – keyboards (1985–present)
- Marko Nježić – guitar (2008–present)
- Vladimir Čukić – bass guitar (2023–present)
- Marko Kuzmanović – drums (2023–present)

Former members

- Dejan Cukić – vocals (1984-1986)
- Nele Stamatović – guitar (1984–1989)
- Miroslav Cvetković – bass guitar (1984–1991) (1996–2023)
- Krle Jovanović – guitar (1989–1994)
- Čedo Macura – drums (1996–2023)
- Vlada Negovanović – guitar (1996–2001)
- Ljubiša Opačić – guitar (2001–2008; his death)

== Discography ==
- Pozitivna geografija (1984)
- Sa druge strane jastuka (1985)
- Jahači magle (1986)
- Prodavnica tajni (1988)
- Muzika na struju (1993)
- Od bižuterije do ćilibara (1997)
- Zmaj od Noćaja (2001)
- Šou počinje u ponoć (2005)
- Daljina, dim i prašina (2012)
- U sali lom (2018)
- Ovaj svet se menja (2020)
