= Šou počinje u ponoć =

Studio album by Bajaga i Instruktori
- Released: 2005
- Recorded: Go-Go Studio, Belgrade; August 2004-April 2005
- Genre: Pop rock
- Label: PGP-RTS
- Producer: Vojislav Aralica

Bajaga i Instruktori chronology
Ruža vetrova Beograda (2003)	Šou počinje u ponoć (2005)	Daljina, dim i prašina (2012)

Professional ratings
Review scores
Source	Rating
Barikada	7/10 stars
Popboks	2/10 stars

Šou počinje u ponoć (trans. The Show Begins at Midnight) is the eight studio album from Serbian rock band Bajaga i Instruktori, released in 2005.

The album featured numerous guests: Negative vocalist Ivana Pavlović on vocals in the song "Fanki taksi", Bebi Dol on vocals in "Bademi i so" and "Pesma slobode", Marko Đorđević on horns, Orthodox Celts member Ana Đokić on violin, the band Vrelo, and folk singer Vida Pavlović, who died before the album release, in the song "Padaj kišo, keve ti". The song "Pesma slobode" is a Serbian language cover of Bob Marley & The Wailers' "Redemption Song".

== Track listing ==
All songs written by Momčilo Bajagić, except where noted.

1. "Kap po kap" ("Drop By Drop") – 4:06
2. "Fanki taksi" ("Funky Taxi") – 4:03
3. "Bademi i so" ("Almonds And Salt") – 3:35
4. "Šou počinje u ponoć" ("The Show Begins At Midnight") – 3:33
5. "Pod jasenom" ("Under The Ash Tree") (Ž. Milenković, M. Bajagić) - 5:40
6. "Padaj kišo, keve ti" ("Rain, Fall, What Are You Doing") – 4:26
7. "Otrov" ("Poison") – 2:51
8. "Ima svet kraja dva" ("The World Has Two Ends") – 4:03
9. "Pesma slobode" ("Redemption Song") (B. Marley, M. Bajagić) – 4:20

== Personnel ==
- Momčilo Bajagić - vocals, guitar
- Žika Milenković - vocals, guitar
- Miroslav Cvetković - bass guitar, backing vocals
- Saša Lokner - keyboards, backing vocals
- Ljubiša Opačić - guitar, backing vocals
- Čeda Macura - drums, backing vocals

=== Additional personnel ===
- Ivana Pavlović - vocals (on track 2)
- Bebi Dol - vocals (on tracks: 3, 9)
- Vida Pavlović - vocals (on track 6)
- Mirna Savić - vocals (on track 7)
- Tamara Aralica - vocals (on track 7)
- Vrelo - choir (on track 5)
- Marjana Popović - backing vocals (on track 6)
- Marina Popović - backing vocals (on track 6)
- Marko Đorđević - horns (on track 4)
- Ana Đokić - violin (on track 9)
- Vojislav Aralica - producer, arranged by, programming by, guitar
- Goran Kostić - recorded by, programming
