= Od bižuterije do ćilibara =

Studio album by Bajaga i Instruktori
- Released: 1997
- Recorded: Vlada Negovanović's home, Belgrade; August - November, 1996
- Genre: Rock
- Label: Komuna
- Producer: Bajaga i Instruktori

Bajaga i Instruktori chronology
Muzika na struju (1993)	Od bižuterije do ćilibara (1997)	Neizbrisano (1997)

Od bižuterije do ćilibara (trans. From Bijouterie to Amber) is the sixth studio album from Serbian and former Yugoslav rock band Bajaga i Instruktori, released in 1997.

== Track listing ==
All songs written by Momčilo Bajagić, except where noted.

1. "Silikon (2004.)" ("Silicone (2004.)") – 3:40
2. "Tvoja je gajba sigurna" ("Your Home Is Safe") – 5:11
3. "Još te volim" ("I Still Love You") – 4:42
4. "To!" ("Yes!") – 3:51
5. "Iza nas..." ("Behind Us...") - 4:35
6. "Leti leti ptico" ("Fly, Fly, Bird") – 4:37
7. "Nezgodna varijanta (Jedna od...)" ("Inconvenient Variant (One Of...)") – 5:19
8. "Ne volim zimu" ("I Don't Like The Winter") (Ž. Milenković, M Bajagić) – 2:38
9. "Što ne može niko možeš ti" ("What No One Can Do, You Can Do") – 5:08

== Personnel ==
- Momčilo Bajagić - vocals, guitar
- Žika Milenković - vocals, guitar
- Miroslav Cvetković - bass guitar, backing vocals
- Saša Lokner - keyboards, backing vocals
- Vlada Negovanović - guitar, backing vocals
- Čeda Macura - drums, backing vocals

=== Additional personnel ===
- Saša Habić - cello
- Boško Milaković - drum programming

== Reception ==
The songs "Silikon (2004.)", "Tvoja je gajba sigurna", "Ne volim zimu", and the ballads "Još te volim" and "Iza nas" were the album's biggest hits.
