= Muzika na struju =

Studio album by Bajaga i Instruktori
- Released: 1993
- Genre: Pop rock
- Length: 47:54
- Label: Produkcija Stig

Bajaga i Instruktori chronology
Četiri godišnja doba (1991)	Muzika na struju (1993)	Od bižuterije do ćilibara (1997)

Professional ratings
Review scores
Source	Rating
Ritam	4/5 stars

Muzika na struju (trans. Electric Music) is the fifth studio album from Serbian and former Yugoslav rock band Bajaga i Instruktori, released in 1993.

The song "Marinina tema" was previously written for the theatre play Život Jovanov. The song "Golubica" featured Kristina Kovač, Aleksandra Kovač, Oktobar 1864 vocalist Tanja Jovićević, and Marija Mihajlović on backing vocals.

The songs "Gde si", "Ovo je Balkan", and "Golubica" featured political-related lyrics and an anti-war message (as the album was released during the third year of the Yugoslav Wars). The song "Golubica" was based on the instrumental Bajagić played at Terazijska česma during the March 9, 1991 protest.

== Track listing ==
All songs written by Momčilo Bajagić, except where noted.

1. "Muzika na struju" ("Music On Power") – 3:54
2. "Grad" ("City") – 3:47
3. "Gde si" ("Where Are You") – 4:06
4. "Grudi nosi k'o odlikovanja" ("She Wears Her Chest Like Decorations") – 3:23
5. "Mali svira gitaru" ("The Little One Is Playing The Guitar") - 3:13
6. "Na grani" ("On The Border") – 4:37
7. "Jedino to se zove ljubav" ("Only That Is Called Love") – 5:05
8. "Ovo je Balkan" ("These Are The Balkans") – 3:02
9. "Marinina tema" ("Marina's Theme") - 3:53
10. "Lolita" ("Lolitta") – 4:34
11. "Nakostrešena mačka" (Bristling Cat) (Ž. Milenković, M Bajagić) – 3:20
12. "Golubica" ("Dove") – 5:14

== Personnel ==
- Momčilo Bajagić - vocals, guitar
- Žika Milenković - vocals
- Miroslav Cvetković - bass guitar
- Saša Lokner - keyboards
- Nenad Stamatović - guitar
- Vladimir Golubović - drums

=== Additional personnel ===
- Kristina Kovač - backing vocals
- Aleksandra Kovač - backing vocals
- Tanja Jovićević - backing vocals
- Marija Mihajlović - backing vocals
