= Kulušić =

Glazbeno-scenski centar Kulušić (GSC Kulušić)
- Kulušić, Zebra
- Interactive map of Glazbeno-scenski centar Kulušić (GSC Kulušić)
- Address: 6 Hrvojeva Street
- Location: Zagreb, Croatia
- Coordinates: 45°48′27.5″N 15°59′19″E
- Type: Music venue
- Events: Rock, punk rock, new wave

Construction
- Opened: 6 February 1966
- Renovated: 1979
- Closed: 2002

Kulušić was a concert club in Zagreb, SR Croatia, SFR Yugoslavia), which hosted many famous international acts and all the important acts from the region. It is particularly associated with the Yugoslav new wave acts of the late 1970s and early 1980s. Many Live albums which today are part of the ex-Yugoslav music history were recorded in Kulušić. Film, Bijelo dugme and Azra recorded their live albums in Kulušić in 1981, followed by Buldožer, Haustor and Leb i sol in 1982, and Ekatarina Velika and Električni orgazam in 1986. Davor Gobac of Psihomodo Pop introduced his infamous stage undressing act in a 1983 gig in Kulušić. Bajaga i Instruktori, one of the foremost Yugoslav pop-rock bands, held their very first concert in Kulušić, on April 12, 1984.

From its inception in 1966, Kulušić was run by the League of Socialist Youth of Yugoslavia's (SSOJ) SR Croatia branch (SSOH), a youth wing of the Croatian Communist League (SKH), itself the SR Croatia branch of the only political party in SFR Yugoslavia — the Yugoslav Communist League (SKJ). In 1987, the day-to-day running of the club was taken over by Tomo in der Muhlen.
