= Disciplina Kičme discography =

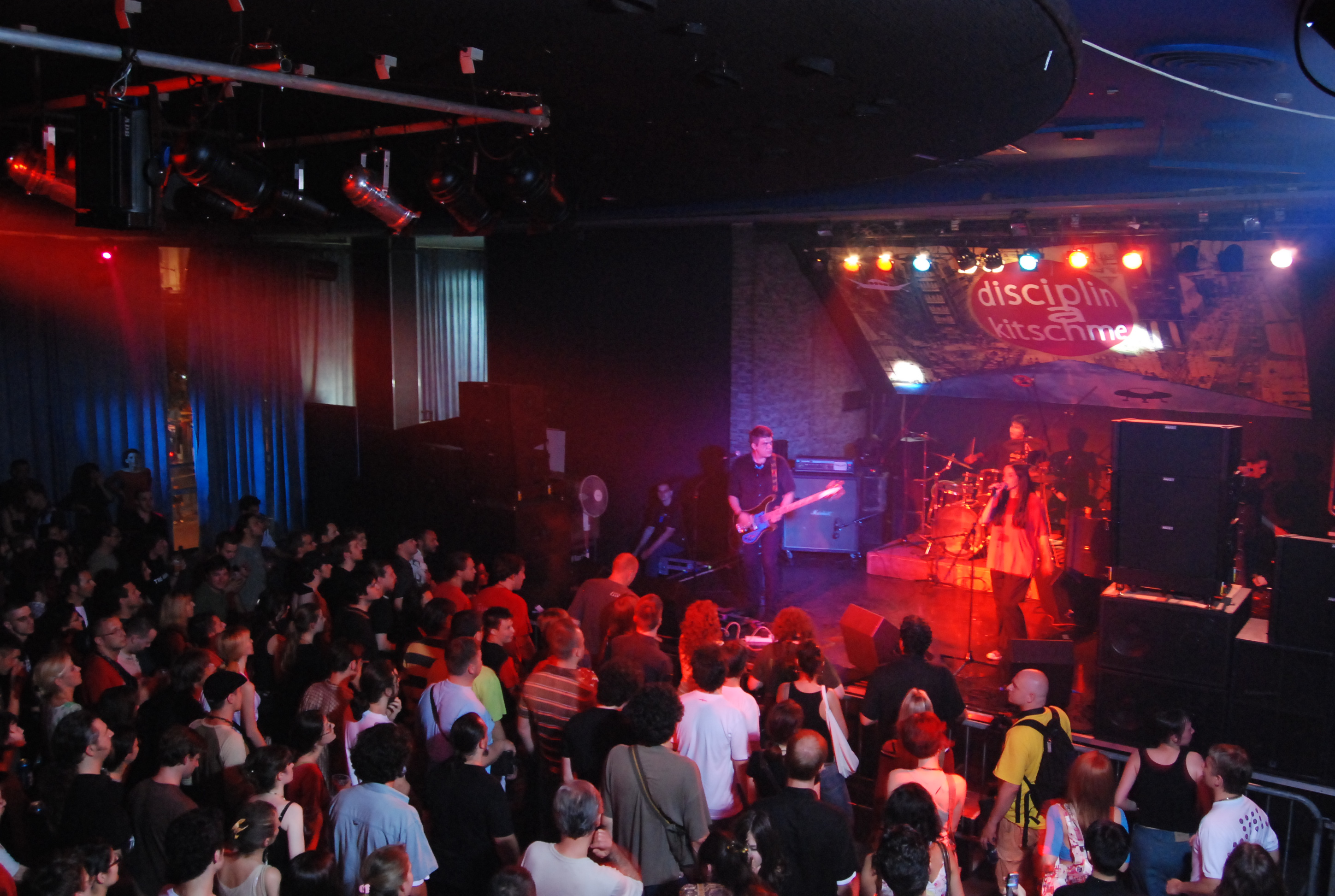
- Disciplin A Kitschme performing in Belgrade in 2007
- Studio albums: 8
- Extended plays: 2
- Live albums: 1
- Compilation albums: 2
- Singles: 6
- Video albums: 1
- Other appearances: 7

The discography of Disciplina Kičme / Disciplin A Kitschme, a Serbian alternative rock band from Belgrade formed in 1982, consists of nine studio albums, one live album, two extended plays, two compilation albums, six singles, and a live DVD video release. The band also appeared on several various artists compilations and recorded several promotional music videos. The band lineup frequently changed throughout the releases clustering around the band frontman Dušan Kojić, also known as "Koja", "Zeleni Zub", "Black Tooth" and "Crni Zub" as he often appears on the band releases. Since 1995, the band started using an alternative name, Disciplin A Kitschme, and since the year, all the band releases, except the reissues of the released Disciplina Kičme material, were signed with the alternative band name.

== Studio albums ==
Year	Album details
1982	Sviđa mi se da ti ne bude prijatno: Released: 1983; Label: Helidon; Format: LP, CS, CD
1984	Ja imam šarene oči: Released: 1985; Label: Dokumentarna; Format: LP, CS, CD
1986	Svi za mnom!: Released: 1986; Label: Helidon; Format: LP, CS, CD
1987	Dečija pesma: Released: 1987; Label: PGP RTB; Format: LP, CS
1989	Zeleni Zub na Planeti Dosade: Released: 1990; Label: PGP-RTB; Format: LP, CS
1990	Nova iznenađenja za nova pokolenja: Released: 1991; Label: PGP-RTB; Format: LP, CS
1996	I Think I See Myself On CCTV: Released: 1996; Label: Babaroga records / Tom Tom Music; Format: CS, CD
1998	Heavy Bass Blues: Released: 1998; Label: Babaroga records / Tom Tom Music; Format: CS, CD
2001	Refresh Your Senses, NOW!: Released: 2001; Label: Babaroga records / Tom Tom Music; Format: CS, CD
2007	Kada kažeš muzika, na šta tačno misliš, reci mi?: Released: 2007; Label: PGP-RTS; Format: CS, CD
2011	Uf!: Released: 2011; Label: PGP-RTS; Format: LP, CS, CD

== Live albums ==
Year	Album details
1986	Najlepši hitovi! Uživo!: Released: 1987; Label: PGP RTB; Format: LP, CS

== Compilation albums ==
Year	Album details
2000	Ove ruke nisu male... 1: Released: 2000; Label: Tom Tom Music; Format: CD
2005	Ove ruke nisu male... 2: Released: 2005; Label: Tom Tom Music; Format: CD

== Singles ==
Year	Single details
1990	"Buka u modi": From the album: Zeleni Zub na Planeti Dosade; Released: 1990; Label: PGP RTB; Format: 7"
1996	"Have You Ever Heard Of Any Other Rhythm?": From the album: I Think I See Myself On CCTV; Released: 1996; Label: Babaroga records; Format: 7", 12", CD
1997	"Do Not": From the album: I Think I See Myself On CCTV; Released: 1983; Label: Babaroga records; Format: CD
1999	"Da Answer": Signed as Tooth-Gofie-Nappy; Released: 1999; Label: Babaroga records; Format: CD
1999	"Političari + virusi": Released: 2005; Label: PGP-RTS; Format: CD

== Box sets ==
Year	Album details
2006	Ove ruke nisu male 3: Released: 2014; Label: Mascom Records; Format: CD

== Video albums ==
Year	Album details
2006	Uživo sa Egzit-a! / Live At Exit!: Released: 2006; Label: PGP-RTS; Format: DVD
2013	Video Uf!: Released: November 14, 2013; Label: Mikser/Vreme; Format: DVD

== Other appearances ==
Year	Song	Album
1986	"Doboš 7 puta"	Metalka 35
1992	"Svidja mi se da..."	Made In Yugoslavia - Πράξη Πρώτη
1996	"Have You Ever Heard Of Any Other Rhythm"	Ustani i kreni
2002	"Have You Ever Heard Of Any Other Rhythm"	Metropolis vol.1
2004	"Novac neće doći"	Rock'n'roll vol. 2
2005	"Zašto"	Rock'n'roll vol. 2
