= I Think I See Myself on CCTV =

I Think I See Myself On CCTV

Studio album by Disciplin A Kitschme
- Released: 1996
- Recorded: 1996, The Fortress, London
- Genre: Alternative rock; funk rock; jazz fusion; noise rock; drum and bass
- Length: 57:12
- Label: Babaroga, Tom Tom Music; BABA CDL 1
- Producer: Black Tooth

Disciplin A Kitschme chronology
Nova iznenađenja za nova pokolenja (1991)	I Think I See Myself On CCTV (1996)	Heavy Bass Blues (1998)

I Think I See Myself On CCTV is the fifth studio album by the Serbian alternative rock band Disciplina Kičme, but the first to be released by the London version of the band working under an alternative band name Disciplin A Kitschme. The album was released by the Tom Tom Music for former Yugoslavia and Babaroga records for the United Kingdom, the latter label was founded by the band themselves, and all the UK albums were released through the label. Most of the material on the album featured rerecorded versions of Disciplina Kičme songs, featuring lyrics in English language.

== Track listing ==
All tracks written by Black Tooth and arranged by Disciplin A Kitschme.

No.	Title	Length
1.	"Enter"	0:46
2.	"Behind Nine Hills" (based on "Iza 9 brda" from the 1990 album Zeleni Zub na Planeti Dosade)	6:11
3.	"Oh Why?" (based on "Zašto" from the 1986 album Svi za mnom!)	6:19
4.	"Is That Really All?" (based on "Zar je to sve" from the 1990 album Nova iznenađenja za nova pokolenja)	6:56
5.	"I've Got Those Teknicolor Eyes" (based on "Novac neće doći" from the 1985 EP Ja imam šarene oči)	8:36
6.	"Do Not" (based on "Nemoj" from the 1983 album Sviđa mi se da ti ne bude prijatno)	4:42
7.	"Have You Ever Heard Of Any Other Rhythm?" (based on "Da li znaš za neki drugi ritam" from the 1990 album Nova iznenađenja za nova pokolenja)	5:30
8.	"U.S.P." (based on "Ovo je zvuk" from the 1986 album Svi za mnom!)	2:25
9.	"Queueing (99 And One Half Day)"	8:06
10.	"Children Song" (based on "Dečija pesma" on the 1988 EP Dečija pesma)	7:57

== Personnel ==
=== The band ===
- Black Tooth (Dušan Kojić) — bass, vocals [shouting], producer, mixed by, written by, artwork by [design] (as Koya)
- Gofie Bebe — vocals, percussion
- Beat (Pete Warren) — drums

=== Additional personnel ===
- Winnetou — castanets
- DJ Illusion Excluder — mixed by (tracks: 1, 5, 8, 9)
- Johan Tamashi — photography
- Andreya — photography
- Leo — photography
- Emina — photography
- Dan (Dan Swift) — recorded by
- Shaun (Shaun Harvey) — recorded by, mixed by
