= Bezobrazno Zeleno =

Yugoslav rock band

- Bezobrazno Zeleno in 1989

Background information
- Origin: Belgrade, SR Serbia, SFR Yugoslavia
- Genres: New wave; pop rock; power pop
- Years active: 1980-1984; 1988-1991; 2017-2019
- Labels: Jugoton, PGP-RTB
- Past members: Bojan Vasić; Vojislav Bešić; Dragoljub Spasić; Katarina Benedetić; Zoran Janić; Srđan Todorović; Zoran Ilić; Branislav Petrović; Saša Komadinović; Ivan Kljajić

Bezobrazno Zeleno (Serbian Cyrillic: Безобразно Зелено, trans. Rudely Green) was a Yugoslav rock band formed in Belgrade in 1980.

Led by bass guitarist Bojan Vasić, the band belonged to the second generation of Belgrade new wave bands and took part in the notable Artistička radna akcija compilation album. In 1984 the band released their debut album BZ1, but ended their activity soon after the album release. The band reformed in 1988, releasing their second studio album, Neonske bajke (1989), which featured more power pop-oriented sound. However, the band disbanded once again in 1991, due to the outbreak of Yugoslav Wars. In 2017 Vasić and the band's original drummer Dragoljub Spasić reunited and released several songs announcing the band's comeback album, but the album was never released due to Vasić's death in 2019.

== History ==
=== New wave years (1980-1984) ===
Bezobrazno Zeleno was formed in 1980 by Bojan Vasić (bass guitar), Vojislav Bešić "Beške" (guitar, vocals), Dragoljub Spasić "Điđi" (drums) and Katarina Benedetić (vocals). The band got the name as a rebellious reaction to the phrase commonly used for the young, being "green". The band was the participant of the Artistička radna akcija (Artistic Work Action, 1981) compilation, featuring the second generation of the new wave bands from Belgrade, with the tracks "Bežim niz ulicu" ("I'm Running Down the Street") and "Beograd" ("Belgrade").

Due to the Bešić and Spasić's departure because of their mandatory stint in the Yugoslav People's Army, former Radnička Kontrola drummer Srđan "Žika" Todorović and guitarists Zoran Ilić and Branislav Petrović "Banana", the latter a former Pasta ZZ member, joined the band. Katarina Benedetić left the band, dedicating herself to her art studies and later to career as a painter, and for a period of time the band performed with vocalist Zoran Janić, who later joined the band Vrele Usne (Hot Lips).

In February 1983 the band appeared in the first edition of the Ventilator Demo Top 10 radio show with the song "Običaji" ("Customs"). Later during the year they released their debut album, BZ1. The album featured Roze Poze member Vlada Milačić as guest vocalist and was produced by Riblja Čorba guitarist Momčilo Bajagić "Bajaga". The album featured a new version of "Bežim niz ulicu", the hit ballad "Gibaj se" ("Limber Yourself Up") and "Jutro" ("Morning"), composed by Nebojša Antonijević and originally performed by the band Butik (Boutique). The album ought to have included the song "Long live moja Srbijo" ("Long Live My Serbia"), which was denied by the editors of the band's record label, PGP-RTB, who feared possible accusations of nationalism. The band also had to change the lyrics for the track "Momci sa juga" ("The Boys from the South"), altering the verse "Smenjujemo generale" ("We're down-trowing generals") with "Sadićemo banane" ("We'll grow bananas") and the verse "Udaramo na vlast" ("We're fighting the government") with "Smejemo se uglas" ("We're laughing out loud").

In Spring 1984 the band played in Belgrade Trade Union Hall as an opening act for Momčilo Bajagić, who presented his solo album Pozitivna geografija. Soon after, the group disbanded. Petrović joined Električni Orgazam, Todorović started an acting career and played with Disciplina Kičme, Ekatarina Velika and Kazna Za Uši, and Vasić got a job as a mailman. After performing with Vrele Usne, Zoran Janić retired from scene and died in the mid-1980s.

=== Reformation and breakup (1988-1991) ===
In 1988 Vasić and Ilić reformed the band with Spasić on drums, former Šlogirani Karanfil (Carnation with a Stroke) vocalist Saša Komadinović "Džeger" and guitarist Ivan Kljajić. Together they recorded their comeback record Neonske bajke (Neon Fairytales), released in 1989. The songs were written by Vasić and Ilić, backing vocals were sung by Dejan Cukić and the album was produced by Bajaga i Instruktori bassist Miroslav Cvetković "Cvele". Beside their own songs, the album featured cover versions of Frank Zappa's "Bobby Brown" and Sweet hit "The Ballroom Blitz", the latter with lyrics in Serbian and entitled "Divlje dete" ("Wild Child"). Neonske bajke brought the hard rock hit "Bombarderi" ("Bombers"). The album also featured Vasić's song "Diraš me" ("You're Touching Me"), which later appeared on Cukić's solo album Spori ritam (Slow Rhythm), and Ilić's theme "Deca sa meseca" ("Children from the Moon"), which later appeared on Riblja Čorba album Koza nostra (Cosa Nostra) as "Ja je gledam kako spava" ("I Am Looking at Her while She Is Asleep").

In 1991, with the beginning of Yugoslav wars, Komadinović moved to South Africa and the band split up.

=== Post breakup ===
In 1992 Vasić initiated the formation of the supergroup Babe, with Bajaga i Instruktori vocalist Žika Milenković, Električni Orgazam drummer Goran Čavajda "Čavke" and Ilić, who had, in the meantime, joined Riblja Čorba. However, Vasić left the band soon after, following Komadinović to South Africa, where the two formed a club cover band. In 1994 Vasić returned to Serbia and formed the band Kurajberi, featuring Ekatarina Velika keyboard player Margita Stefanović, former Van Gogh vocalist Goran Milisavljević and two of his former bandmates from Bezobrazno Zeleno, guitarist Ivan Kljajić and drummer Dragoljub Spasić. They performed cover versions of foreign and Yugoslav rock hits. Petrović also occasionally performed with the band. They disbanded in 1995, when Vasić stopped performing and started working as a graphic designer and tattoo artist. He also wrote lyrics for Dejan Cukić and the band Njujork (New York).

Ilić became the member of Riblja Čorba in 1989, performing with them until 1996. He performed with Babe until the end of the band's activity in 1999, and took part in the band's reunion in 2013.

Kljajić started working as a producer and joined Ana Stanić's backing band.

After his return from the Yugoslav army, Bešić performed for a while in the band Glissers (The Motorboats), which, for a short period of time, featured Margita Stefanović on keyboards. After that he got a degree in dentistry. In the 1990s he moved to New York City, where he became the member of the band LFAnt. Later, he moved to Mexico, where he worked as a dentist for the poor in a Catholic convent. He published the novel Gringo, inspired by his life in Mexico.

=== New recordings, Vasić's death (2017-2019) ===
During 2017 and 2018 Zoran Vasić and Dragoljub Spasić recorded several southern rock-oriented songs with Vasić on vocals and released them as Bezobrazno Zeleno. The songs "Opet u sedlima" ("Back in the Saddles"), "Luda ženo" ("Crazy Woman"), "Divljina" ("Wilderness"), "Rekla si" ("You Said"), "Kafana" and "Dođi u kuhinju moju", the latter being a cover of Robert Johnson song "Come On in My Kitchen", were released on the band's YouTube channel. The two announced the new studio album entitled Bezobrazno Zeleno 001. Bojan Vasić's died on 9 September 2019 from lung cancer, his death ending plans for Bezobrazno Zeleno comeback album.

== Legacy ==
In 2008, Serbian punk rock band Novembar released a cover of Bezobrazno Zeleno song "Bombarderi" on their album Radulizam.

In 2011, the song "Gibaj se" was voted, by the listeners of Radio 202, one of 60 greatest songs released by PGP-RTB/PGP-RTS during the sixty years of the label's existence.

"Beograd" and "Bežim niz ulicu" lyrics were featured in Petar Janjatović's book Pesme bratstva, detinjstva & potomstva: Antologija ex YU rok poezije 1967 - 2007 (Songs of Brotherhood, Childhood & Offspring: Anthology of Ex YU Rock Poetry 1967 - 2007).

== Discography ==
=== Studio albums ===
- BZ1 (1983)
- Neonske bajke (1989)

=== Other appearances ===
"Beograd" / "Bežim niz ulicu" (Artistička radna akcija, 1981)

== See also ==
- New wave music in Yugoslavia
