= Popečitelji =

- Origin: Pristina, AP Kosovo, Serbia (1995–1999); Kragujevac, Serbia (1999–present)
- Genres: Noise rock (early); alternative rock; instrumental rock; funk rock; folk rock
- Years active: 1995–present
- Labels: Mojo Beat, Odličan hrčak, Druga stvar
- Members: Saša Furunović; Goran Furunović; Dušan Lazić
- Past members: Radeta Vulić; Ivan Cvetković

Popečitelji (Serbian Cyrillic: Попечитељи, an archaism with the meaning Ministers) is a Serbian rock band formed in Pristina in 1995.

Formed by brothers Saša (guitar) and Goran Furunović (bass guitar) and Radeta Vulić (drums), the group initially performed alternative/noise rock. Moving to Kragujevac in 1999, the band started performing their blend of funk rock and ethnic music. Popečitelji released their first studio album in 2004, gaining prominence on the Serbian rock scene. The group has released three more studio albums since, and Furunović brothers have embarked on several side projects.

== History ==
=== 1995–present ===
The band was formed in Pristina in 1995 by brothers Saša (guitar) and Goran Furunović (bass guitar) and Radeta Vulić (drums). They named the band Popečitelji, which is an archaism for government ministers used in 19th century Serbia. Initially, the group performed their version of alternative/noise rock sound. After the 1999 NATO bombing of FR Yugoslavia, the group moved to Kragujevac, where they developed their blend of instrumental funk rock and ethnic music.

After a series of performances across Serbia, the band had their first performance in the country's capital Belgrade in August 2003, performing as the opening act for American saxophone player Maceo Parker on his concert in the garden of Students' Cultural Center. In 2004, the band released their debut album Ko radi? (Who's Working), produced by Dušan Kojić "Koja". In 2005, the group performed as the opening act for Canadian punk rock band Nomeansno on their concert in Belgrade. In 2008, the band released their second studio album Horizonti (Horizons), produced by themselves. The album featured the band's trademark instrumental funk rock/folk rock sound, but also included tracks with vocals. Their third album Sijalica (Light Bulb) was released in 2013. The album was produced by Saša Furunović, who also designed the album cover.

In 2015, Radeta Vulić left the band to join Disciplin A Kitschme, and was replaced by Ivan Cvetković. In 2015, Popečitelji started their own label Druga stvar (Other Thing), through which they released the singles "Kroz" ("Through") and "Bum!" ("Boom!"). In 2018, Cvetković was replaced by Dušan Lazić. The band's fourth studio album Uvek (Always) was co-released by Druga stvar and Odličan hrčak label in 2021.

=== Side projects ===
Simultaneously with his work with Popečitelji, Saša Furunović started his instrumental rock side project Fitnes (Fitness) in 2003. He was joined by Goran Furunović and keyboardist Aca Pejčić in 2009. In 2011, in empty auditorium of Kragujevac cinema Šumadija, the band recorded the album Udarci i varnice (Hits and Sparks). Saša Furunović, under the pseudonym CD Ministar (CD Minister), performed with singer-songwriter Bojana Bulatović "Bo", and the Furunović brothers took part in the recording of Bulatović's 2008 album Kapetane, gde si? (Captain, Where Are You?). As CD Ministar, Saša Furunović released the album Zabit (Backwoods) in 2015.

== Discography ==
=== Studio albums ===
- Ko radi? (2004)
- Horizonti (2008)
- Sijalica (2013)
- Uvek (2021)

=== Singles ===
- "Društvo" (2011)
- "Kroz" (2015)
- "Bum!" (2015)
