= Uživo sa Egzit-a! / Live At Exit! =

Video by Disciplin A Kitschme
- Released: 2006
- Recorded: July 10, 2005; Exit Festival, Novi Sad
- Genre: Alternative rock; funk rock; jazz fusion; noise rock; drum & bass; post-punk
- Label: PGP RTS; DVD 490231
- Producer: Vlada Marjanović

Disciplin A Kitschme chronology
Ove ruke nisu male... 2 (2005)	Uživo sa Egzit-a! / Live At Exit! (2006)	Kada kažeš muzika, na šta tačno misliš, reci mi? (2007)

Professional ratings
Review scores
Source	Rating
Popboks	7/10 stars

Uživo sa Egzit-a! / Live At Exit! is a live DVD release by the Serbian alternative rock band Disciplin A Kitschme, released by PGP RTS in 2006. The recording consists of the band performance at the 2005 Novi Sad Exit Festival. This is one of the first releases by the new, Belgrade version of the band.

== Track listing ==
All tracks by Koja.

No.	Title	Length
1.	"Svi za mnom!" (Everybody, follow me!)
2.	"Političari & virusi" (Politicians & viruses)
3.	"Evil Man"
4.	"Your Soul"
5.	"Iza 9 brda"
6.	"Queueing (99 And One Half Day)"
7.	"Oh Why?"
8.	"Zeleni Zub" (Black Tooth)
9.	"Betmen, Mandrak, Fantom" (Batman, Mandrake, Phantom)
10.	"I've Got Those Teknicolor Eyes"
11.	"Zar je to sve?" (Is that really all?)
12.	"Buka u modi" (Noise in fashion)

== Personnel ==
=== The band ===
- Koja (Dušan Kojić) — bass, vocals, music by, lyrics by, mixed by, artwork by [design]
- Buca (Miloš Velimir) — drums, vocals
- Manja (Manja Đorđević) — vocals
- PP — percussion -

=== Additional personnel ===
- Cvele (Miroslav Cvetković) — mastered by
- Vlada Marjanović — other [video post production]
- Stanislav Milojković — photography
- Boris Mladenović — recorded by
