= Radnička Kontrola =

Yugoslav punk rock/new wave band

Background information
- Origin: Belgrade, Serbia, Yugoslavia
- Genres: New wave, punk rock
- Years active: 1979 – 1981
- Label: Jugoton
- Past members: Zoran Kostić; Srđan Todorović; Srđan Marković; Darko Milojković; Mladen Pajević

Radnička Kontrola (Serbian Cyrillic: Радничка Контрола, trans. Workers' Control) was a former Yugoslav punk rock/new wave band from Belgrade, active in the late 1970s and early 1980s and notable for its appearance on the compilation album Artistička radna akcija.

Several years after the group disbanded, its vocalist Zoran Kostić "Cane" went on to nationwide prominence in Yugoslavia as the frontman of Partibrejkers. Another member of the group, Žika Todorović, later became the drummer for the cult bands Ekatarina Velika and Disciplina Kičme in addition to achieving international acclaim as a movie actor.

== History ==
=== Formation and breakup ===
The band was formed in 1979, featuring vocalist Zoran Kostić "Cane" who had previously sang with Kopilad and Urbana Gerila, bassist Srdan "Đile" Marković, guitarist Darko Milojković, and drummer Žika Todorović. Furthermore, drummer Mladen Pajević—who would later play with Radost Evrope, Šine, Robna Kuća, and Lutke—spent a short time with Radnička Kontrola as well.

Inspired by the post-punk sound of Joy Division and Public Image Ltd, Radnička Kontrola managed to record only two tracks, "Dosada" ("Boredom") and "TV u koloru" ("Colour TV"), both of which appeared on the various artist compilation Artistička radna akcija. Filling in for the band's drummer Todorović who was out sick when the band went into the studio to record "Dosada", the track features Ljuba Sedlar on drums. Additionally, the drums on the "TV u koloru" studio recording were played by Relja Obrenović from Petar i Zli Vuci while the track's lyrics were written by Solunski Front's Ciga Krstić despite the liner notes crediting Cane Kostić. Recorded for the Jugoton-organized Artistička radna akcija compilation in the Enco Lesić-owned Druga Maca studio in Belgrade, the compilation's producer Lesić reportedly failed to show up for the scheduled Radnička Kontrola recording session, so the band's two tracks were in actuality produced by the studio's engineers Miroslav "Cvele" Cvetković (later would play bass at Bajaga i Instruktori) and Vruć Vetar bassist Zoran "Tuta" Tutić. In later interviews, Radnička Kontrola members publicly stated their displeasure with the quality of the production work on the tracks, with bassist Marković calling it "dilettantish".

Radnička Kontrola appeared at a two-day new wave festival, ABRS (i.e. Aktuelna beogradska rock scena), held at Belgrade's Tašmajdan Stadium during September 1981. The performance became infamous due to young Kostić's on-stage behaviour; namely, his continual lewd and profane verbal insults directed at the crowd until so much commotion was created that the police decided to step in and temporarily halt the show. Kostić's public conduct prompted a discussion in the local press on the morals and values of Yugoslav youth. The band's last live appearance took place one month later during October 1981 in Ljubljana as support act for Šarlo Akrobata. This was also Šarlo Akrobata's last concert.

=== Post breakup ===
After the band disbanded, Kostić formed his own band Partibrejkers, becoming one of the most popular Yugoslav bands. He also participated the Rimtutituki anti war project in 1992, Pesme iznad istoka i zapada Christian rock project, and Kao da je bilo nekad... Posvećeno Milanu Mladenoviću, Milan Mladenović tribute album.

Srđan Todorović Žika joined Bezobrazno Zeleno with whom he recorded their first studio album. Then he moved on to Disciplina Kičme (1984–1987), Ekatarina Velika (1987–1990) and Kazna Za Uši on their 1994 album Izliv radosti napad srece. Beside music he also worked as an actor and later completely devoted to acting. He is one of the most successful Serbian actors.

Srđan Marković "Đile" started working as a writer and a visual artist mainly inspired by 1960s underground comic books. He also worked with Disciplina Kičme and in 1989 formed an electro post-punk duo DDT, renamed to Supernaut in 1993.

Darko Milojković worked with Disciplina Kičme, appearing on the 1985 EP Ja imam šarene oči and 1986 studio album Svi za mnom!, and Boye, appearing on their 1988 album Dosta! Dosta! Dosta!.

== Discography ==
| Title | Released |
|---|---|
| "Dosada" / "TV u koloru" | 1981 |
