= Heavy Bass Blues =

Studio album by Disciplin A Kitschme
- Released: 1998
- Recorded: 1998, On-U-Sound, Crosstown, The Fortress, London
- Genre: Alternative rock; jazz fusion; funk rock; noise rock; drum & bass
- Length: 50:28
- Label: Babaroga, Tom Tom Music; BABA CDL 2
- Producer: Black Tooth, Skip McDonald

Disciplin A Kitschme chronology
I Think I See Myself On CCTV (1996)	Heavy Bass Blues (1998)	Ove ruke nisu male... 1 (2000)

Heavy Bass Blues is the sixth studio album by the Serbian alternative rock band Disciplina Kičme, and the second to be released by the London version of the band working under an alternative band name Disciplin A Kitschme. The album was released by the Tom Tom Music for former Yugoslavia and Babaroga records for the United Kingdom. Part of the material on the album featured rerecorded versions of Disciplina Kičme songs, featuring lyrics in English language.

== Track listing ==
All tracks written by Black Tooth, except track 5, written by John D. Loudermilk, and arranged by Disciplin A Kitschme.

No.	Title	Length
1.	"Mmmhum"	0:14
2.	"Bedroom Muzik"	5:15
3.	"Ain't No Reason"	7:06
4.	"Noize In Fashion" (based on "Buka u modi" from the 1990 album Nova iznenađenja za nova pokolenja)	5:13
5.	"Tobacco Road" (The Nashville Teens cover)	4:19
6.	"Mannitou Part 3"	4:24
7.	"Mouse In Your Hand"	2:38
8.	"High-Temperature Man" (based on "Čovek sa visokom temperaturom" from the 1990 album Nova iznenađenja za nova pokolenja)	3:59
9.	"New Song"	5:05
10.	"Heavy Bass Blues"	5:35
11.	"Envelope"	4:05
12.	"D' Endless Session"	2:17

== Personnel ==
=== The band ===
- Black Tooth (Dušan Kojić) — bass, vocals [shouting], producer, mixed by, written by
- Gofie Bebe — vocals, percussion
- Beat (Pete Warren) — drums, percussion, vocals [screaming], mixed by (tracks: 4, 8, 12)

=== Additional personnel ===
- Skip McDonald — producer [recording], performer [vibe maker], mixed by (tracks: 3, 7, 9), backing vocals (track 2)
- DJ Illusion Excluder — mixed by (tracks: 3, 4, 7 to 9, 12)
- Pete Lorentz — engineer (tracks: 1, 2, 5, 6, 10, 11)
- Darren (Darren Grant) — recorded by (tracks: 2, 3, 6, 7, 9 to 11)
- Dave Murder — recorded by (tracks: 4, 5, 8, 12)
