= Batman Theme =

1966 single by Neal Hefti

- US picture sleeve

Single by Neal Hefti

from the album Batman Theme and 11 Other Bat Songs
- B-side: "Batman Chase"
- Released: January 3, 1966
- Studio: RCA Victor (Hollywood, California)
- Length: 2:16
- Label: RCA Victor
- Songwriter: Neal Hefti

Neal Hefti singles chronology
"Batman Theme" (1966)	"Gotham City Municipal Swing Band" (1966)

"Batman Theme", the title song of the 1966 Batman TV series, was composed by Neal Hefti. This song is built around a guitar hook reminiscent of spy film scores and surf music. It has a twelve bar blues progression, using only three chords until the coda. The music was performed by "the Wrecking Crew" with Tommy Tedesco on the guitar, Carol Kaye on bass and other studio musicians that dominated the music scene.

The eleven cries of "Batman!" are sung by a chorus of four tenors and four sopranos (performed by the Ron Hicklin Singers). A common misconception is that the chorus is actually a horn section, a rumor began shortly after the TV series ended its initial run in 1968, and gained attention from Adam West's 1994 book Back to the Batcave, in which he incorrectly recalled that the theme featured horns rather than vocals. Neal Hefti, the writer of the theme, stated that the chorus was made up of eight singers, one of whom jokingly wrote on his part, "word and music by Neal Hefti". According to TV's Biggest Hits by Jon Burlingame, which includes an interview with Hefti about the creation of the song, the song consists of "bass guitar, low brass and percussion to create a driving rhythm, while an eight-voice chorus sings 'Batman!' in harmony with the trumpets". The song reached No. 13 on Canada's CHUM Chart and No. 41 on the RPM chart.

In addition to Hefti's original version and the movie soundtrack version by Nelson Riddle, versions were made by the Marketts (single "Batman Theme" [No. 5 CAN] and album The Batman Theme Played by The Marketts), the Ventures (The Ventures Play the "Batman" Theme, Dolton BST8042, 3/1966), Al Hirt, the Standells and actor/musician David McCallum.

The song has been parodied in the more than half a century since its debut. The theme has been re-recorded by dozens of artists, including Link Wray, Voivod, the Jam, the Who, and the Kinks.

== Charts ==
=== Neal Hefti ===
Chart (1966)	Peak position
Canada RPM 100	41
US Billboard Hot 100	35

Chart (1988)	Peak position
UK Singles (Official Charts Company)	55

=== The Marketts ===
Chart (1966)	Peak position
Canada RPM 100	5
US Billboard Hot 100	16

=== Nelson Riddle ===
Chart (1989)	Peak position
UK Singles (Official Charts Company)	91

== Covers ==
- Jimmy Bowen Orchestra and Chorus released a version of the song on their 1966 album, Sunday Morning with the Comics.
- Eminem mimics the theme in his song, "Without Me" in 2002.
- Jan and Dean covered the Batman theme song on their 1966 album, Jan and Dean Meet Batman.
- English rock band The Who recorded a cover of the theme in 1966. It was originally released on the EP Ready Steady Who, but has since been re-released as a bonus track on CD pressings of A Quick One.
- Hefti played with and arranged for Harry James' band starting in the late 1940s, and Harry James released a cover of Hefti's Batman theme on his 1966 album Live at the Riverboat (Dot DLP 3728 and DLP 25728).
- English rock band The Kinks played a cover of the theme at their show at Kelvin Hall, Glasgow, in 1967. The song was performed as part of a medley where the band appears to get lost. They start out with "Milk Cow Blues", then do the Batman theme, then "Tired of Waiting", then back to "Milk Cow Blues". It was released on the LP Live at Kelvin Hall.
- Liverpool poet Adrian Henri and his band Liverpool Scene did a skit of the theme in the late 60s using Henri's poem "Batpoem".
- English punk band The Jam covered the "Batman Theme" on their debut album In the City in 1977.
- In 1966, an album called Batman and Robin: The Sensational Guitars of Dan and Dale was released featuring members of the Sun Ra Arkestra and The Blues Project. The opening track is a cover of the "Batman Theme", while the rest of the album is taken up with a combination of instrumental jams and modernised workings of classical pieces, all given Batman-oriented names.
- Canadian metal band Voivod did a cover on their 1988 Dimension Hatröss album.
- Serbian and Yugoslav alternative rock band Disciplina Kičme recorded a cover on their 1987 album Najlepši hitovi! Uživo! (Prettiest Hits! Live!).
- New York saxophonist and composer, John Zorn, led off his 1990 album, Naked City, with a version of "Batman".
- The Well Paid Scientists (Henry Cullen & Dave Lalouche) produced an acid techno remix entitled To The Batrave......Let's Go in 1998.
- According to Ritchie Blackmore, the main riff in "Space Truckin'" by the English rock band Deep Purple is based on the "Batman Theme".
- Rapper Snoop Dogg sampled the Batman Theme for his song "Batman & Robin" on the album Paid tha Cost to Be da Boss (2002). It featured RBX and Lady of Rage and was produced by DJ Premier.
- In the video game Mother 3, the main riff is interpolated in the music that plays when fighting the enemy 'Mr Batty'.
- Stan Freberg recorded a comedy skit in 1966 entitled "Flakman and Reagan", about Ronald Reagan's campaign for the Governorship of California, with his straight adviser, a press agent named "Flakman". Freberg could not obtain the rights to use Hefti's music, and so a variation of the "Batman Theme" had to be used, without direct plagiarism.
- A segment on Sesame Street in 1969 featured kindergarten children drawing sketches, that started with the letter B, had a bat drawn, in which one of the kindergarten boys was singing the "Batman Theme" as well as saying the man with a bat cape was called "Batman".
- P.D.Q. Bach (Peter Schickele) quoted the "Batman Theme" in the last movement ("Agnus Dei") of his Missa Hilarious, while a car horn blasted out twice "Here Comes the Bride".
- Eddie Vedder of Pearl Jam and his daughter Harper recorded a version of the Batman Theme in 2016 which is regularly played on Pearl Jam SIRIUS XM Radio. SIRIUS XM Radio also put out an accompanying video of Eddie and Harper's version of the theme on their YouTube channel with references to the Batman TV series.
- The Lego Batman Movie prominently features the theme, though often sung or played in comedically ridiculous ways.
- An instrumental rock version of the Batman Theme briefly appears in the Gotham episode "That's Entertainment". It is played by Jerome Valeska and his gang after they took over a rock concert.
- The Arrowverse crossover "Crisis on Infinite Earths" features the theme playing briefly as Burt Ward portrays Dick Grayson of Earth-66, who experiences red skies.
- Space Jam: A New Legacy features the theme as Bugs Bunny and LeBron James are trying to stop a runaway train in DC World.

== Legacy ==
- Artists Prince and R.E.M. used variations of (but did not remake) the TV show theme in their work: Prince in the song "Batdance" (which appeared on the soundtrack to Tim Burton's 1989 movie), and R.E.M. in a rejected song for the Batman Returns soundtrack, later released under the title "Winged Mammal Theme", as a B-side to the single "Drive". In a televised interview with talk show host Oprah Winfrey, Prince played the theme on a piano in response to the question, "You taught yourself to play at seven years old? Do you remember your first song?"
