= Lutke =

- Also known as: Salame, Krvopije
- Origin: Belgrade, Serbia
- Genres: Indie rock, power pop
- Years active: 1987–1999; 2002–present
- Labels: L.V.O. Records, Radio Boom 93, B92, Ammonite Records
- Members: Nenad Jovanović; Bojan Dmitrasinović; Đuro Kojić; Dušica Stojković
- Past members: List: Dejan Radovanović Dejan Stanišić Dragan Antonijević Galina Kuzmanović Zoran Aković Dejan Stanišić Srđan Višnjić Vladan Nojković Marija Vučković Maja Mladenović Đorđe Kovačević Drago Senić Mladen Pajević Zoran Aković Zlatko Šetvić Zlatko Sehić
- Website: Official Myspace page

Lutke (Serbian Cyrillic: Лутке; trans. The Dolls) is a Serbian power pop band from Belgrade.

== History ==
=== 1980s ===
The band was formed in 1987 by high-school friends Nenad Jovanović (guitar, vocals), Dejan Radovanović (guitar), Zlatko Šetvić (bass guitar) and Zoran Aković (drums). Starting under as Salame (The Salamis), and then Krvopije (The Bloodsuckers), the band finally chose the name Lutke (The Dolls). The lineup for a short while had also featured Saša Pavlović on guitar (who later had become a monk at the Mount Athos), which was one of the many lineup changes the embryonic band lineup had featured. The default lineup recorded a demo recording during 1987, featuring the songs "Ti si tako otrovna" ("You Are so Poisonous") and "Ja sam opet tu" ("I Am here Again"), produced by Srđan Babović, later known as a turbo folk producer. The material was presented to the audience through the local radio stations broadcasts, as well as the live performances the band held, mainly in high schools. An article about the band also appeared in the Ćao magazine.

However, the lineup did not last long due to the band members' army obligations. In late 1989, having returned from the army, Jovanović and Radovanović, with the bassist Dejan Stanišić and drummer Srđan Višnjić, made their several demo recordings, mainly at the Cacadu Studio, often broadcast on the newly formed Radio B92. The recordings also appeared on radio demo top lists, and several radio shows, including the one hosted by Milan Petrović "Tica", who had become one of the leading supporters of the group.

=== 1990s ===
In the early 1990s, the band sporadically performed, mainly at the Belgrade club Dadov, and on performances with other bands. However, the current political and economical situation and the outbreak of the Yugoslav wars had gradually affected the group activities. The band continued recording, and the demo versions of the songs "Nebo" ("The Sky"), and "Smešak kobnog jutra" ("A Fatal Morning Smile"), charted on the Studio B radio show Diskomer and the music videos for the tracks appeared on the RTB television show Afirmator. The success of the media promotion provided the band an opportunity to perform at the Brzi bendovi Srbije festival, during 1992, and the notable Belgrade clubs, KST, SKC and Dom Omladine.

In 1994, drummer Srđan Višnjić left the band, later becoming an established rally driver, being replaced by Vladan Nojković, with whom the band got the opportunity to release their debut album. The album was recorded at the Novi Sad Do-Re-Mi studio, and was co-produced by the band members with the studio owners Predrag Pejić and Aleksandar Stamenković "Stamena". Moderan svet (The modern World), released on compact cassette only by L.V.O. Records in 1996, beside the material written by the band themselves, also featured a cover version of The Pretenders song "2000 Miles". The album was intended to be reaction of the band to the current britpop music scene in Great Britain.

Promotional videos for the album were recorded for the songs "Ke putana" (transliteration for "Que putana", trans. "What a Whore"), "Moderan svet" ("The modern world"), both directed by Ivan Markov. The latter video was banned soon after its premier due to the legal actions taken by a model who appeared in the video, due to the dissatisfaction with the outcome of the recordings. After the album release, the band had a minor tour to promote the album, with the performances mainly being held in Belgrade clubs, during which the band played in Kragujevac, which was their first live appearance outside Belgrade.

The following year, the song "Znam da je kraj" ("I Know It's Over"), which was released on the debut album, appeared on the B92 and Radio Boom 93 various artists compilation Ovo je zemlja za nas?!?, following a contract with the former record label. In the meantime, on early 1997, the lineup changed once again, with Dejan Radovanović leaving the band, and the new lineup featured Đuro Kojić "George" (guitar, violin) and Maja Mladenović (organ). The following year, the new lineup entered the Košutnjak Music Factory studio and from February until June 1998 recorded the material which was to be released on the second studio album.

In October 1998, the band released the second studio album, Polyester, composed of material written during the decade-spanning band career, the musical orientation from the previous release, with a special accent given to string arrangements. The album was produced by Đorđe Petrović, and guest appearances on the album featured Galina Kuzmanović, who played violin on the track "La petit folie" ("A Tiny Madness"), and did vocals and backing vocals, and Kristali trumpet player Nenad Potje. A promotional video was recorded for the track "Sjaj" ("Glow"), once again directed by Ivan Markov, becoming a nationwide hit.

The album release was followed by a large media promotion and a tour during which the band had performed accompanied by a string section consisting of five violins and two cellos as well as a brass section featuring a saxophone and a trombone. The tour was interrupted by the beginning of the NATO bombing of Yugoslavia, during which the band had disbanded. Drummer Nojković moved to Egypt and then to Canada and organ player Maja Mladenović moved to Denmark. In the meantime, the Socialist Party of Serbia regime had taken over the Radio B92, confiscating all of the remaining copies of Polyester.

=== 2000s ===
In 2000, Nenad Jovanović with the Chiq Toxic member Branislav Pakić, formed the electropop band Foto, releasing the album Kosmos Srbija (Cosmos Serbia) in 2002 under the indie record label Ammonite Records, with the title track becoming a nationwide hit. In the meantime, Jovanović reformed Lutke with the guitarist George Kojić, and the drummer Đorđe Kovačević. The lineup recorded a promotional video for the track "Novi dan" ("A New Day"), directed by Miloš Đukelić. Drummer Kovačević was replaced in 2004 by Mladen Pajević, the veteran of the Serbian new wave and punk rock scenes, who performed with the bands Radnička Kontrola, Šine, Robna Kuća and Radost Evrope. The following year, Drago Senić, a former Qrve, Petar Pan and Komandosi member, became the new bassist.

In 2007, the band, after a nine-year discography break, released the third studio album Fontanela (Fountainella), under the indie record label Ammonite Records. The album, produced by Drago Senić, featured the material recorded during 2006, featured ten new songs, written by Jovanović during the 2000s, except the cover version of the Drago Mlinarec and Josipa Lisac track "Noćna ptica" ("Night Bird"), written by Mlinarec and Karlo Metikoš. Promotional videos was recorded for the track "N.L.O." ("U.F.O."]). After the album release, the band, featuring Jovanović, Kojić, Pajević, bassist Duška Rajković and keyboard player and vocalist Dušica Stojković, also a Generacija Bez Budućnosti member, went on a promotional tour including Belgrade, Novi Sad, Gornji Milanovac, Subotica, Kragujevac and Niš, which was the first live appearance of the band in eight years.

In 2009, Jovanović released the second studio album with the side project Foto, entitled Sinteza (Synthesis), through Ammonite Records. In the meantime, Bojan Dmitrasinović became the new Lutke drummer.

=== 2010s ===
In April 2014, the band released the album Spiralni snovi (Spiral Dreams). The album, previously announced by singles "Beograd gori" ("Belgrade Is Burning"), "Kišobran" ("Umbrella"), "Poslednji put" ("The Last Time"), "Neka živi ovaj dan" ("Long Live This Day"), and a cover of Leo Martin's song "Laku noć, draga" ("Goodnight, Darling"), was released on CD through Ammonite Records and for listening on Deezer.

At the end of 2016, the band announced the release of their new studio album during the spring of 2017.

== Discography ==
=== Studio albums ===
- Moderan svet (1996)
- Polyester (1998)
- Fontanela (2007)
- Spiralni snovi (2014)

=== Other appearances ===
- "Znam da je kraj" (Ovo je zemlja za nas?!?; 1997)
