= Kada kažeš muzika, na šta tačno misliš, reci mi? =

Studio album by Disciplin A Kitschme
- Released: 2007
- Recorded: March 2007, Concept Films studio, Košutnjak, Akademija studio, Belgrade
- Genre: Funk rock; noise rock; drum & bass; experimental rock
- Length: 59:03
- Label: PGP RTS; CD 416415
- Producer: Crni Zub

Disciplina Kičme chronology
Uživo sa Egzit-a! / Live At Exit! (2006)	Kada kažeš muzika, na šta tačno misliš, reci mi? (2007)

Professional ratings
Review scores
Source	Rating
Groupie.hr	Favorable
Terapija.net	9/10 stars

Kada kažeš muzika, na šta tačno misliš, reci mi? (When you say music, what exactly do you mean, tell me?) is the eight studio album by the Serbian alternative rock band Disciplina Kičme, and the first to be released by the latest Belgrade version of the band working under an alternative band name Disciplin A Kitschme. The album was released by the PGP RTS, the heir of the PGP RTB label, under which the band had released several album in the 1980s and early 1990s.

== Track listing ==
All tracks arranged by Disciplin A Kitschme and written by Koja.

No.	Title	Length
1.	"Intro"	0:58
2.	"Bunt" (Riot)	5:18
3.	"Info"	4:46
4.	"Neko mora to da spreči" (Somebody has to stop it)	5:15
5.	"Čovek koji ne nosi sat" (A man not wearing a watch)	5:36
6.	"Hitra smeđa lisica preskače lenjeg psa" (The quick brown fox jumps over the lazy dog)	4:22
7.	"Ego"	5:44
8.	"Pomerite se, nemojte tu stajati" (Move yourselves, do not stand there)	0:17
9.	"Robo-Bluz" (Robot-blues)	6:20
10.	"Političari + virusi (Disko 07 Verzija)" (Politicians + viruses (disco 07 version))	5:10
11.	"Znači" (Therefore)	0:37
12.	"Kada kažeš muzika, na šta tačno misliš, reci mi?" (When you say music, on what exactly do you think, tell me?)	4:52
13.	"Manitu 5"	5:27
14.	"(Untitled)"	4:28

== Personnel ==
=== The band ===
- Koja (Dušan Kojić) — bass, vocals, djembe, drums [snare drum], timpani, music by, lyrics by, mixed by,
- Buca (Miloš Velimir) — drums, djembe, drums [snare drum], timpani, vocals
- Manja (Manja Đorđević) — vocals

=== Additional personnel ===
- Crni Zub (Dušan Kojić) — artwork by [design], producer
- Vlaca (Vladimir Đorđević) — djembe, drums [snare drum], timpani, vocals [featuring]
- Goran Vukojčić — mastered by
- Danko Đurić — photography
- Stanislav Milojković — photography
- Momma Hell — photography
- Mobil Buca — photography
- Aleksandra Stojanović — recorded by
- Banana (Branislav Petrović) — vocals [featuring]
