= The Narcs =

New Zealand band

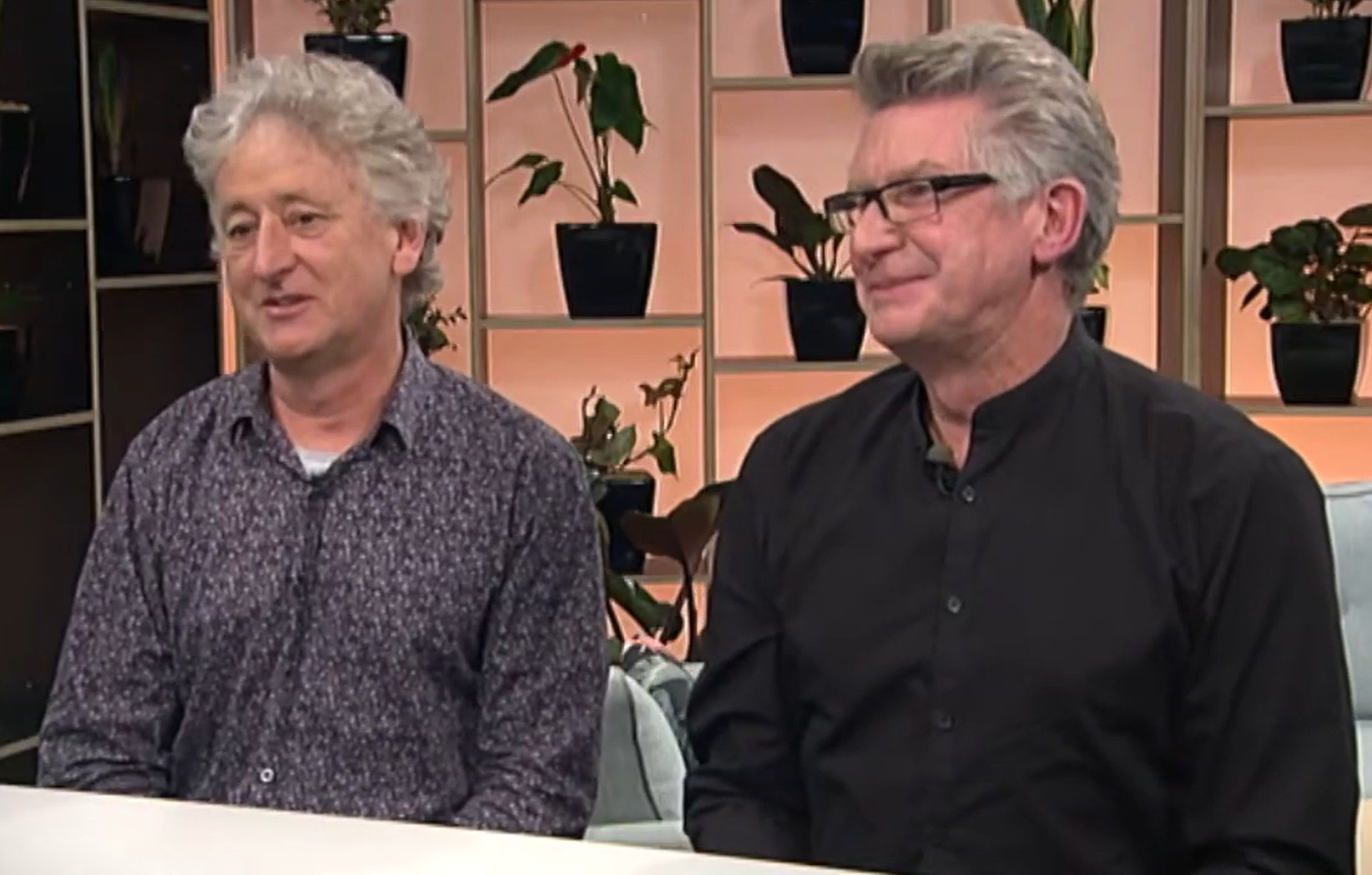
Left to right:Liam Ryan, Tony Waine in 2018

The Narcs are an award-winning New Zealand band, that formed in 1980 in Christchurch, New Zealand, by bassist Tony Waine, drummer Bob Ogilvie and guitarist Garth Sinclair, who was replaced by Australian guitarist/singer songwriter Andrew Dickson.

Christchurch remained the band's base with a series of resident club and pub gigs building their following. Touring had become a regular event for The Narcs by 1981, and the pressures of the road contributed to Bob Ogilvie leaving – being replaced by Steve Clarkson on drums in 1982. Keyboardist Liam Ryan became a full-time Narc in 1983.

The band pursued a management deal with Mike Chunn, and signed a record deal with CBS Records.

During a retreat at a commune the band wrote most of the songs for their debut album, Great Divide. The single, "Heart and Soul", peaked at No. 4 on the NZ charts. At the 1984 New Zealand Music Awards, the band won 3 awards and the album achieved gold disc status.

The band worked in both NZ and Australia, recording a total of four albums and playing alongside such acts as Midnight Oil, Split Enz, Elton John and Queen.

The band reformed in 2016 with ex-DD Smash drummer Peter Warren and Rikki Morris of The Crocodiles and have continued to play live and record music since then. In 2018, the band released new single 'Summerhill Stone'.

== Discography ==
=== Albums ===
List of albums, with New Zealand chart positions
Title	Extended play details	Peak chart positions
Title	Extended play details	NZ
Whistle While You Work (with Coconut Rough)	Released: November 1983; Label: CBS (SBP 237956); Formats: LP, Cassette	17
Great Divide	Released: November 1984; Label: CBS (SBP 238038); Formats: LP, Cassette	14
The Narcs	Released: November 1985; Label: CBS (SBP 8123); Formats: LP, Cassette	27
Push the Boat Out	Released: 1996; Label: Hark Records (HKC30); Formats: CD	-
Best of The Narcs	Released: 2002; Label: EMI (5406092); Formats: CD; Note: Compilation album	-

=== Extended Plays ===
List of albums, with New Zealand chart positions
Title	Extended play details	Peak chart positions
Title	Extended play details	NZ
The Narcs	Released: 1981; Label: XSF (XS 006); Formats: LP	-
No Turning Back	Released: May 1983; Label: CBS (BA 12040); Formats: LP, Cassette	12

=== Singles ===
List of singles with selected New Zealand positions
Title	Year	Peak chart positions	Album
Title	Year	NZ	Album
1982	"Over My Head"	-	Whistle While You Work
1983	"Look the Other Way"	38	
1984	"You Took Me (Heart and Soul)"	4	Great Divide
1984	"Lazy Susan"	35	Great Divide
1984	"Missing in Action"	-	Great Divide
1985	"Diamonds On China"	14	The Narcs Album
1985	"Side By Side"	-	The Narcs Album
1986	"Abandoned By Love"	-	The Narcs Album
1988	"It's Got To Be Love"	49	
1995	"Back to the Deep"	-	Push the Boat Out

== Awards and nominations ==
=== Aotearoa Music Awards ===
The Aotearoa Music Awards (previously known as New Zealand Music Awards (NZMA)) are an annual awards night celebrating excellence in New Zealand music and have been presented annually since 1965.

Year	Nominee / work	Award	Result	Ref.
1982	The Narcs	Group of the Year	Nominated	
1983	The Narcs	Group of the Year	Nominated	
1984	"You Took Me Heart and Soul"	Most Popular Song	Won	
1984	"You Took Me Heart and Soul"	Single of the Year	Won	
1984	Dave McArtney for "You Took Me Heart and Soul" by The Narcs	Producer of the Year	Won	
1984	Graeme Mhyre for "You Took Me Heart and Soul" by The Narcs	Engineer of the Year	Won	
Andy Dickson (The Narcs)	Male artist of the Year	Nominated		
1985	Fane Flaws for "Diamonds On China" by The Narcs	Video the Year	Won	
