= Srđan Todorović =

Serbian musician and actor (born 1965)

- Срђан Тодоровић
- Born: 28 March 1965 (age 61); Belgrade, Yugoslavia
- Other name: Žika
- Education: Faculty of Dramatic Arts
- Occupations: Actor, musician
- Years active: 1981–present
- Children: 1
- Parent: Bora Todorović

Srđan "Žika" Todorović (Serbian Cyrillic: Срђан "Жика" Тодоровић, pronounced [sř̩d͡ʑan todǒːroʋitɕ]; born 28 March 1965) is a Serbian actor and musician. He has played drums in numerous bands, including Ekatarina Velika, Disciplina Kičme, Radnička Kontrola and Bezobrazno Zeleno.

Srđan is the son of Serbian actor Bora Todorović and his first wife Snežana Matić. He is married to Ana, with whom he had a son, Dejan, who died in late 2017 at three years of age. His mother is former ballerina Snežana Matić.

== Discography ==
=== With Radnička Kontrola ===
- "Dosada" / "TV u koloru" (1981)

=== With Bezobrazno Zeleno ===
- 1 (1983)

=== With Disciplina Kičme ===
- Sviđa mi se da ti ne bude prijatno (1983)
- Ja imam šarene oči (1985) (EP)
- Svi za mnom! (1986)
- Dečija pesma (1988) (EP, guest appearance)

=== With Ekatarina Velika ===
- Ljubav (1987)
- Samo par godina za nas (1989)
- Neko nas posmatra (1993, guest appearance)
- Kao u snu – Live '91 (2001, live, guest appearance)

=== With Kazna Za Uši ===
- 3 (1994, split album, guest appearance)
- Izliv radosti napad sreće (1994)

=== With Partibrejkers ===
- Kiselo i slatko (1994)

=== With Električni Orgazam ===
- Zašto da ne! (1994)
- A um bum (1999) (guest appearance)
- Najbolje pesme vol. 2 1992-1999 (compilation, tracks from Zašto da ne!)

=== With Plejboj ===
- "Zajedno" (1995) (single, guest appearance)

== Filmography ==
| Year | Title | Role | Notes |
|---|---|---|---|
| 1986 | Dancing in Water | Kica | |
| 1987 | Oktoberfest | Goran | |
| 1988 | Zaboravljeni | Kifla | |
| 1989 | Kako je propao rokenrol | Koma | |
| 1992 | We Are Not Angels | Devil | |
| 1992 | The Black Bomber | Fleka | |
| 1995 | Underground | Jovan | |
| 1997 | Tri letnja dana | Nikola | English title: Three Summer Days |
| 1998 | Black Cat, White Cat | Dadan Karambolo | |
| 1998 | Three Palms for Two Punks and a Babe | Lane | |
| 2000 | Rat uživo | Dule | English title: War Live |
| 2000 | Tandem | Papandreu | |
| 2001 | Absolute 100 | Igor | |
| 2002 | Frozen Stiff | Kiza | |
| 2003 | Strawberries in the Supermarket | Ratnik Marko Kraljević | |
| 2004 | Sivi kamion crvene boje | Ratko | |
| 2005 | Mi nismo anđeli 2 | Devil | English title: We Are Not Angels 2 |
| 2005 | Ivkova slava | Smuk | |
| 2006 | Mi nismo anđeli 3: Rock & roll uzvraća udarac | Devil | |
| 2008 | Vratiće se rode | Dule Pacov | |
| 2010 | A Serbian Film | Miloš | |
| 2010 | Montevideo, God Bless You! | Bora Jovanović | |
| 2014 | See You in Montevideo | Bora Jovanović | |
| 2017 | Requiem for Mrs. J. | Ludi Gaja | |
