= The Fall of Rock and Roll =

Kako je propao rokenrol Како је пропао рокенрол How Rock'n'Roll was Ruined
- Directed by: Zoran Pezo; Vladimir Slavica; Goran Gajić
- Written by: Branko Vukojević; Aleksandar Barišić; Biljana Pajkić
- Starring: Srđan Todorović; Velimir Bata Živojinović; Sonja Savić; Branimir Brstina; Nebojša Bakočević; Anica Dobra; Branko Đurić; Vesna Trivalić; Bogdan Diklić; Dragan Bjelogrlić; Slobodan Ninković; Dušan Kojić
- Release date: 1989 (SFRY)
- Running time: 98 minutes
- Language: Serbo-Croatian

Kako je propao rokenrol (Serbo-Croatian: Kako je propao rokenrol, Како је пропао рокенрол; How Rock 'n' Roll Was Ruined) is a 1989 Serbian anthology comedy film. It consists of three stories, written and directed by three different screenwriters and directors. The score was also a joint effort, with lead musicians from the rock bands Idoli, Električni Orgazam, and Disciplina Kičme each composing the music for one segment. The three independent stories are situated within the context of popular and youth culture in Yugoslavia at the time just before the country broke up, and abound with satirical, farcical, and absurdist humour. The film was awarded a Golden Arena for Best Film Editing at the Pula Film Festival in 1989. It attained cult status in the following years.

== Soundtrack ==
The soundtrack for the film was released in 1989. The music for each story segment was written by a different musician, with intro, outro, and intermezzos composed and acted by Dušan Kojić as his stage persona Zeleni zub (Green Tooth).

No.	Title	Writer(s)	Length
1.	"Doživljaji Zelenog zuba"	Dušan Kojić	4:10
2.	"Skalpeli"	Vlada Divljan	1:08
3.	"Ljubavna tema"	Vlada Divljan	0:50
4.	"Hasanaginica rep"	Vlada Divljan	1:03
5.	"Montažni kompjuter"	Vlada Divljan	0:43
6.	"Nindža mix"	Vlada Divljan, Zoran Pezo, Branko Vukojević	3:10
7.	"Ljubavna tema Japan"	Vlada Divljan	0:16
8.	"Skalpeli žive"	Vlada Divljan	0:45
9.	"Ljubavna tema - kraj"	Vlada Divljan	0:23
10.	"Novi doživljaji Zelenog zuba"	Dušan Kojić	0:30
11.	"Drakulina tema"	Srđan Gojković	0:45
12.	"Tvoj dan"	Srđan Gojković	2:50
13.	"Barbarina tema"	Srđan Gojković	1:00
14.	"Srećna Nova godina"	Srđan Gojković	2:09
15.	"Ja ne mogu više"	Srđan Gojković	2:56
16.	"Hajde, hajde devojko"	Srđan Gojković	2:30
17.	"Dobro jutro"	Srđan Gojković	1:08
18.	"Najnoviji doživljaji Zelenog zuba"	Dušan Kojić	1:38
19.	"Nećemo I"	Dušan Kojić	1:06
20.	"Trese, lupa, udara"	Dušan Kojić	3:01
21.	"U pozorištu"	Dušan Kojić	1:10
22.	"Pokojni Toza"	Dušan Kojić	2:11
23.	"S. stan"	Dušan Kojić	2:40
24.	"Orman"	Dušan Kojić	0:13
25.	"San"	Dušan Kojić	0:58
26.	"Crveno"	Dušan Kojić	3:39
27.	"Waka - Ćaka"	Dušan Kojić	0:33
28.	"Nećemo II"	Dušan Kojić	3:19
29.	"E & Đ stan"	Dušan Kojić	2:17
30.	"Zdravo, Zube zeleni"	Dušan Kojić	2:35

== See also ==
- List of Yugoslav films
- Popular music in SFR Yugoslavia
- Rock and roll and the fall of communism
