= Refresh Your Senses, NOW! =

Studio album by Disciplin A Kitschme
- Released: 2001
- Recorded: 2001, Third Stone Studio, London
- Genre: Alternative rock; jazz fusion; funk rock; noise rock; drum & bass
- Length: 58:52
- Label: Babaroga, Tom Tom Music; BABA CDL 3
- Producer: Black Tooth

Disciplin A Kitschme chronology
Ove ruke nisu male... 1 (2000)	Refresh Your Senses, NOW! (2001)	Ove ruke nisu male... 2 (2005)

Refresh Your Senses is the seventh studio album by the Serbian alternative rock band Disciplina Kičme, and the third to be released by the London version of the band working under an alternative band name Disciplin A Kitschme. The album was released by the Tom Tom Music for former Yugoslavia and Babaroga records for the United Kingdom. Part of the material on the album featured rerecorded versions of Disciplina Kičme songs, featuring lyrics in English language. The album featured songs dealing with the new political situation in Serbia, "D' Demoncracy Yeah" and "Surely They Won't Get Much... of My Sympathy".

== Track listing ==
All tracks written by Black Tooth, and arranged by Disciplin A Kitschme.

No.	Title	Length
1.	"NFO"	0:38
2.	"Evil Man"	5:31
3.	"I'm A Shape-Shapeshifter"	6:40
4.	"This Is How It Should Be Done"	2:17
5.	"Error 404 [Dna-Dno]"	6:08
6.	"Your Soul"	9:04
7.	"Surely They Won't Get Much... Of My Sympathy"	7:21
8.	"Da Answer"	5:44
9.	"Mannitou Pt. 4"	5:33
10.	"D-D-Demoncracy. Yeah!"	9:52

== Personnel ==
=== The band ===
- Black Tooth (Dušan Kojić) — bass, vocals [shouting], producer, mixed by, written by
- Gofie Bebe — vocals, percussion, whistle [da real whistle]
- Will Parker — drums

=== Additional personnel ===
- DJ Illusion Excluder — mixed by
- Pete Lorentz — mixed by
- John Kleine — mastered by
- Patric Bird — mastered by
