= Roze Poze =

Serbian and Yugoslav rock band

Background information
- Origin: Belgrade, Serbia
- Genres: Pub rock; Celtic rock; garage rock; power pop
- Years active: 1985–2018
- Labels: PGP-RTB, Ćao Sound, Carlo Records, PGP-RTS, Rockland Production, Electric Records
- Past members: Željko Nikolić; Vlada Čalić; Oliver Đurić; Sava Đustibek; Vladimir Milančić; Dušan Živanović; Vladan Aćimović; Zoran Bogićević; Branislav Popović; Miladin Stojković; Dragan Todorović

Roze Poze (Serbian Cyrillic: Розе Позе, transl. Pink Poses) were a Serbian and Yugoslav rock band, formed in Belgrade in 1985.

Roze Poze were formed and led by guitarist and vocalist Željko Nikolić. The band gained popularity with their pub/garage rock sound with Celtic influences and football-themed lyrics written by lyricist Vlada Čalić, who was throughout the band's whole career considered an official member, being the only mainstay member alongside Nikolić. During their career, the group had released six studio album and had several hit songs. Since the release of their last studio album in 2010, the band had performed live occasionally only, having their last performance in 2018, although never officially announcing their disbandment. In 2023, Željko Nikolić, who had been immobile for the last several years of his life due to illness, died in a fire.

== History ==
=== 1985–2023 ===
Roze Poze were formed in 1985 by guitarist and vocalist Željko Nikolić (formerly of the bands Zebra and Marki), vocalist Oliver Đurić, guitarist Sava Đustibek, bass guitarist Vladimir Milančić and drummer Dušan Živanović, with lyricist Vlada Ćalić being involved in the band's work and considered an official member since its formation. Soon after, Đustibek was replaced by new guitarist, Vladan Aćimović "Aćim", and Đurić left the band, Nikolić taking over the spot of the lead vocalist.

In 1987, the band issued their debut release, the 7-inch single with the songs "Poskok rock" ("Horned Viper Rock") and "Bordžije" ("Borgias"), through PGP-RTB. During the same year, Nikolić made a guest appearance on the EP Dečija pesma by the band Disciplina Kičme, with whose frontman, Dušan Kojić "Koja", he used to perform occasionally during the early 1980s. In 1989, Roze Poze released the EP Daj gol (Score a Goal). The title track, which was a cover of "You'll Never Walk Alone", and "Novine za sedenje" ("Newspapers to Sit On"), both with football-themed lyrics, became the band's first hits.

In 1990, the band released their eponymous debut album, produced by Dušan "Duda" Bezuha, through PGP-RTB. The album featured new versions of all four songs from the Daj gol EP, as well as new songs, part of them inspired by Celtic music, with the songs "Napadaj, ne propadaj" ("Attack, Don't Sink Down") and "Mali zeleni" ("Little Green Men") receiving significant airplay.

In 1992, the band released their second album, Besindžer i Dilindžer (Basinger and Dillinger), produced by Bezuha. The album featured the song "Moj grad" ("My City"), written as a tribute to Phil Lynott, as well as the track "Šest-najst metara" ("Penalty area"), which was a cover of the hymn "Amazing Grace". The bass guitar on the album was played by Zoran Bogićević, and the drums were played by Branislav Popović (formerly of Nesalomivi), the latter coming in as replacement for Živanović, who had left Roze Poze to form the Celtic rock band Orthodox Celts.

In 1993, the band released the album Rokenrol dendi (Rock and Roll Dandy). The album A-side featured harder pub rock sound, while the B-side featured Celtic rock-oriented songs like "Okreni sat" ("Wind the Clock", a cover of traditional song "Auld Lang Syne"), and "Blowin' in the Wind (Dylan on ACID)". The album featured a live version of "Mali zeleni", entitled "Mali zeleni NLO UFO", recorded at the Oxygene studio. The album recording featured guest appearances by the band's former member Dušan Živanović (on accordion) and Živanović's bandmates from Orthodox Celts Ana Đokić (on violin) and Dejan Lalić (on banjo). As the album appeared at the time of the hyperinflation in FR Yugoslavia, it was not promoted extensively as the band's previous releases.

The band intended to name their fourth studio album Do jaja (a slang expression which literally translates to balls high and means great, wonderful) and to release it with an image of male genital area on the cover. However, at the insistence of their record label, PGP-RTS, they renamed the album to Da li si to ti? (Is That You?) and released it with an alternate cover in 1995. The album was produced by Vladimir Negovanović. It featured the unplugged version of the song "Samo poželi" ("Just Wish For") from Rokenrol dendi, recorded on the 1994 unplugged festival in Belgrade's Sava Centar and featuring violinist Aleksandar Štukelja. The following year, the band released the compilation album Daj gol – Najveći hitovi 1990–1995 (Score a Goal – Greatest Hits 1990–1995).

In 2002, Željko Nikolić and Vlada Čalić with a new lineup of the band released the album Zakopano blago (Buried Treasure). The album brought a new series of football chants, like "Najveća je, najveća" ("It's the Greatest, the Greatest"), "U napadu Sartide" ("Attack, Sartid", dedicated to FK Sartid), "Ja sam sa stajanja" ("I'm from the Terrace") and "Hvala ti, hvala ti" ("Thank You, Thank You"), but also non-football related "Zauvek u ratu" ("Forever at War") and "Pola grada zna pola saznaće" ("Half the City Knows, the other Half Will Soon Know"), which received most airplay. In 2005, the band released the compilation album The Best On – Daj gol....

In 2010, after a long hiatus in their work, the band self-released their sixth studio album, Ko je rek'o rokenrol? (Who Said Rock 'n' Roll?) in the new lineup, featuring Željko Nikolić (guitar, vocals), Vlada Čalić (lyrics), Miladin Stojković (bass guitar) and Dragan Todorović "Toša" (drums). The album featured 13 new songs, an instrumental track and two old but previously unreleased songs, "Ton i glas" ("Tone and Voice") and an alternate version of "Poskok rock", both originally recorded in September 1985 by the band's original lineup. The album featured guest appearances by Dragan Stojanović on guitar and Ljuba Đorđević on harmonica.

During the following years, Roze Poze performed occasionally only. The band had their last live performance in 2018. On 5 March 2023, Željko Nikolić, who had been immobile for the last several years of his life due to illness, died in a fire, aged 66.

== Legacy ==
The band's song "Pola grada zna pola saznaće" was covered by Serbian singer-songwriter Lady Jelena for the 2012 film Artilheiro.

== Discography ==
=== Studio albums ===
- Roze Poze (1990)
- Besindžer i Dilindžer (1992)
- Rokenrol dendi (1993)
- Da li si to ti? (1995)
- Zakopano blago (2002)
- Ko je rek'o rokenrol? (2010)

=== EPs ===
- Daj gol (1989)

=== Compilation albums ===
- Daj gol – Najveći hitovi 1990–1995 (1996)
- The Best On – Daj gol... (2005)
