= Babe (Serbian band) =

Serbian musical supergroup and rock band

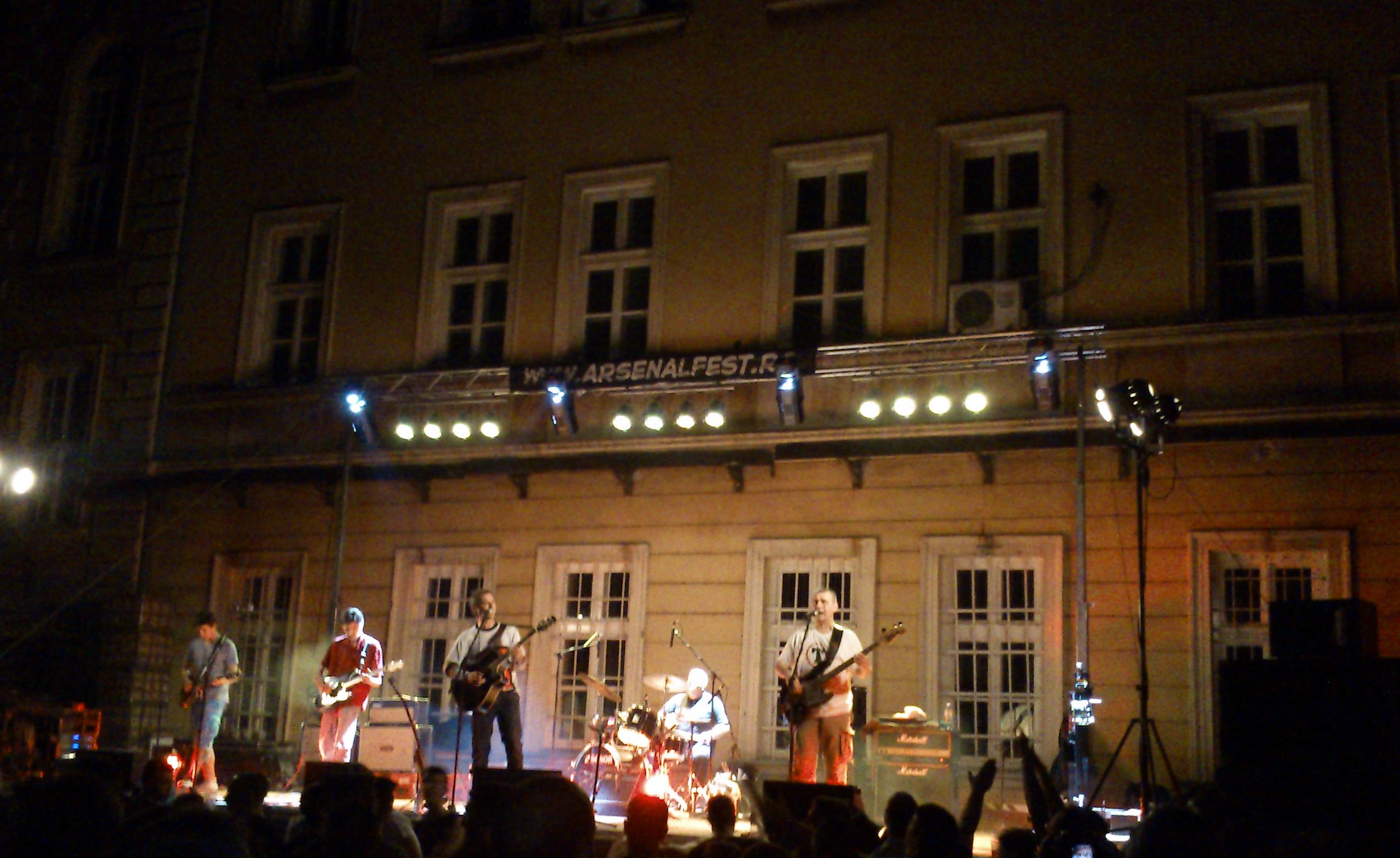
- Babe performing in Niš in 2015

Background information
- Origin: Belgrade, Serbia
- Genres: Rock; pop rock; comedy rock
- Years active: 1992–1999; 2013–present
- Labels: ITVM, ITMM, PGP-RTS
- Spinoff of: Bajaga i Instruktori; Električni Orgazam; Bezobrazno Zeleno
- Members: Žika Milenković; Zoran Ilić; Dejan Škopelja; Goran Ljuboja; Stefan Aćimović; Luna Škopelja
- Past members: Goran Čavajda; Bojan Vasić; Vlada Cvetković; Vladan Nedeljkov; Blagoje Nedeljković

Babe (Serbian Cyrillic: Бабе; translation: Grandmas) is a Serbian rock band formed in Belgrade in 1992.

Babe were formed in 1992 as a supergroup, with Bajaga i Instruktori guitarist Žika Milenković on vocals and guitar, Električni Orgazam drummer Goran "Čavke" Čavajda on drums and vocals, Riblja Čorba guitarist Zoran Ilić, and former Bezobrazno Zeleno bassist Bojan Vasić. They got together with the intention of recording a studio album of quirky and offbeat material they weren't able to push through their respective original bands. Vasić left during the recording sessions and was replaced by Dejan Škopelja (formerly of U Škripcu). Initially a one-off side project, with hits like "Noć bez sna" and "Da te vidim golu" off their 1993 release Slike iz života jednog idiota, Babe unexpectedly gained a significant mainstream popularity in FR Yugoslavia that led to the band's decision to continue on beyond that album.

However, their second album, despite the hit song "Ko me ter'o", did not see the same success. Čavajda left the band after the album release, and the band released another studio album before ending their activity in 1999. Babe reunited in 2013, in the lineup featuring Milenković, Ilić, Škopelja and drummer Goran Ljuboja "Trut".

== History ==
=== Formation and immediate commercial success (1992–1995) ===
The founding members of Babe: Žika Milenković (left) and Goran Čavajda "Čavke" (right)

The band was formed in 1992 as a side project of Bajaga i Instruktori member Žika Milenković (vocals, guitar), Električni Orgazam member Goran Čavajda "Čavke" (vocals, drums) and Riblja Čorba member Zoran Ilić (guitar). All three being rock veterans, they decided to steadily work within the group during the times when their own bands were taking a work break. The band's bass guitarist and the initiator of the band formation was Bojan Vasić, who had previously played with Ilić in Bezobrazno Zeleno. Humorous lyrics written by Milenković, a graduate from Belgrade Faculty of Applied Arts, stylistically similar to the lyrical style of his early 1980s band Mačori (The Cats), and his stage performance, based on the experience gained in the long-term activities within the Teatar Levo (Theatre Left) amateur theatre, soon became the band's trademark.

During the recording sessions for the band's debut album, Vasić left the band, moving to South Africa, eventually only recording the bass sections for the song "Mirko i Marina" ("Mirko and Marina"). He was replaced by a former U Škripcu member Dejan Škopelja. Slike iz života jednog idota (Images From an Idiot's Life), released in 1993 and produced by former Električni Orgazam member Ljubomir Jovanović "Jovec", brought Milenković's humorous songs about drunks, drug dealers and erotomaniacs, which had large success, especially with young audience. The album featured guest appearances by vocalist Marija Mihajlović, Ekatarina Velika keyboardist Margita Stefanović, Riblja Čorba guitarist Vidoja Božinović, Električni Orgazam guitarist Branislav Petrović "Banana", Bajaga i Instruktori guitarist Nenad Stamatović, keyboardist Miša Savić and Del Arno Band members. After the album release, Babe went on a promotional tour, performing as an opening act for Riblja Čorba.

In January 1994 the band performed at the unplugged festival held at the Belgrade Sava Centar, and the recording of the song "Adio stres" ("Adio Stress"), featuring guest appearances by keyboardist Margita Stefanović and Del Arno Band percussionist Vladimir Lešić, was released on the various artists live compilation Bez struje (Unplugged), released by MTS Records. On February 17 of the same year, the band performed at the Belgrade Youth Center and the recording of the cover version of the Azra song "Lijepe žene prolaze kroz grad" ("Pretty Women are Passing Through the Town"), made at the performance, appeared on the various artists live compilation album Groovanje live vol. 1 (Rumbling Live Vol. 1), released by L.V.O Records in 1995. On April 30, 1994 the band performed at the Rock and roll zauvek (Rock and Roll Forever) rock spectacle, held at the Belgrade Fair – Hall 1 in order to celebrate thirty years of rock music in Yugoslavia.

In December of the same year, not long before New Year's Day, the band released a compact cassette EP 4 Babe pesme (4 Babe Songs), featuring the songs "Novogodišnja pesma" ("New Year's Day Song"), "Loša navika" ("Bad Habit"), "Reći ćemo hvala kad bude karnevala" ("We Will Thank Only If There Will Be a Carnival") and "Dizel" ("Diesel"), the latter being a cover version of Tommy Roe's song "Dizzy". At the time, Milenković starred the Elvira je cool (Elvira is Cool) theatre play, also starring Lora Orlović and Neda Arnerić, written by the Aleksandar Žikić and performed at the Dušan Radović Theatre in Belgrade. Also, the band had appeared in the Srđan Dragojević film Two Hours of Quality TV Program, performing the song "Dizel". The following year appeared the soundtrack album for the Marija Soldatović play Zigi, Zvezdana Prašina (Ziggy Stardust), staged at the Bitef Theatre, consisting of cover versions of the David Bowie greatest hits, with Milenković and Čavajda working on the song lyrics translations and the latter providing lead vocals for the cover versions of "Five Years" and "Rock 'n' Roll Suicide".

=== Decline, Čavajda's death and breakup (1995–1999) ===
In late 1995 the band released their second studio album, Lažne slike o ljubavi (False Images of Love), but the album did not reach the success of the debut, although the songs "Ko me ter'o" ("Who's Made Me") and "Mesnica" ("Butcher Shop") became minor hits, having a decent media coverage. The rest of the album remained unnoticed, including the cover version of "Strangers in the Night", with lyrics in Serbian entitled "Stranac usranac" ("Stranger in the Shit"). After the album release, Čavajda left the band, being replaced by Vlada Cvetković. Čavajda later starred the film Geto (Ghetto), directed by Ivan Markov and Mladen Matičević, before moving to Tasmania where he died of AIDS on February 16, 1997 at the age of 35.

In early 1998 the band released the compilation album P.S Babe, composed of the material previously released on the debut album and the 4 Babe pesme EP as well as new material, consisting of the songs "Hoću da budem predsednik Srbije" ("I Want To Be The President of Serbia"), "Zadnja noć" ("The Last Night") and "Mladi ludi svet" ("Young Crazy World"). At the time, the band started preparing the material for the third studio album, with Milenković seeking inspiration for song lyrics in the works of Momčilo Bajagić, Aleksandar Žikić (of the band S.T.R.A.H.), Danko Đurić (of the band Papatra), Zoran Ćirić's book Vulvaši (Vulvas) and street graffiti. Slike sna i jave (Samo za ludake i buntovnike) (Images of Dream and Reality (For Lunatics and Rebels Only)) featuring new members, Vladan Nedeljkov (guitar) and Blagoje Nedeljković (drums), was released in 1999. The material, consisting of sixteen songs, featured the songs "Mexico", written in 1982 during Milenković's work with the band Mačori, and "U sukobu 2 pola" ("In the Two Gender Clash"), a cover of Hazel O'Connor's song "Will You?".

After the album release, Milenković's main band Bajaga i Instruktori started the recording sessions for the album Zmaj od Noćaja (The Dragon of Noćaj), due to which Babe band ceased to exist, even though it had never been officially announced. During 2000, the song "Hoću da budem P.S." ("I want to be P.S.") appeared on the Gotov je! (He is Done!) various artists compilation, which featured protest songs.

=== Reunion (2013–present) ===
In 2013, Babe reunited in the lineup featuring, beside Milenković, Ilić and Škopelja, the drummer Goran Ljuboja "Trut" (of E-Play and formerly of Rambo Amadeus backing band), with guitarist Stefan Aćimović and Dejan Škopelja's daughter, keyboardist Luna Škopelja soon being added to the lineup. The reunited Babe had their first performance at the Long Night festival, held in Belgrade Youth Center on March 30.

In July 2014, the band released their comeback single, "Daj mu ga, Lola" ("Come On, Lola"), originally written in 2001. In the following period the band performed on a number of major festivals, including Arsenal Fest and Belgrade Beer Fest. In March 2017, the band released the single "Primabalerina". In October 2019, the band released the EP Volim život (I Love Life), featuring four new songs, available for free digital download.

== Legacy ==
In 2021 Babe's album Slike iz života jednog idiota was polled 53rd on the list of 100 Best Serbian Albums Since the Breakup of SFR Yugoslavia. The list was published in the book Kako (ni)je propao rokenrol u Srbiji (How Rock 'n' Roll in Serbia (Didn't) Came to an End).

== Members ==
Current members

- Žika Milenković – vocals (1992–1999, 2013–present)
- Zoran Ilić – guitar (1992–1999, 2013-present)
- Dejan Škopelja – bass guitar (1993–1999, 2013-present)
- Stefan Aćimović – guitar (2013–present)
- Goran Ljuboja – drums (2013–present)
- Luna Škopelja – keyboards (2013–present)

Former members

- Bojan Vasić – bass guitar (1992–1993)
- Goran Čavajda – drums (1992–1995)
- Vlada Cvetković – drums (1995–1999)
- Vladan Nedeljković – guitar, bass, keyboards (1999)
- Blagoje Nedeljković – drums (1999)

== Discography ==
=== Studio albums ===
- Slike iz života jednog idiota (1993)
- Lažne slike o ljubavi (1995)
- Slike sna i jave (Samo za ludake i buntovnike) (1999)

=== Extended plays ===
- 4 Babe pesme (1994)
- Volim život (2019)

=== Compilation albums ===
- P.S Babe (1998)

=== Other appearances ===
- "Adio stres" (Bez struje; 1994)
- "Lepe žene" (Groovanje live vol. 1; 1995)
