= Ove ruke nisu male... 1 =

Compilation album by Disciplina Kičme
- Released: 2000
- Recorded: 6–12 December 1982 Tivoli studio, Ljubljana; September 1983, Druga Maca studio, Belgrade; 28 June 1984, SKC, Belgrade; 1982, Lapidarij, Zagreb
- Genre: Funk rock; jazz fusion; noise rock; post-punk
- Length: 60:05
- Label: Tom Tom Music; CD 7005
- Producer: Toni Jurij, Riki Rif, Disciplina Kičme, Zeleni Zub

Disciplina Kičme chronology
Heavy Bass Blues (1998)	Ove ruke nisu male... 1 (2000)	Refresh Your Senses, NOW! (2001)

Ove ruke nisu male... 1 (These hands are not small... 1) is the first compilation album by the Serbian alternative rock band Disciplina Kičme, released by Tom Tom Music in 2000. The compilation features the material released on the first studio album, Sviđa mi se da ti ne bude prijatno, and the first EP, Ja imam šarene oči, as well as live material, recorded at the Zagreb Lapidarij in 1982. The second part of the compilation, Ove ruke nisu male... 2 was released in 2005, by the same record label.

== Track listing ==
=== Sviđa mi se da ti ne bude prijatno ===
No.	Title	Length
1.	"Nestani ih" (Disappear them)	1:50
2.	"Ti znaš da tvoja soba ima četiri ugla" (You know that your room has four corners)	1:19
3.	"Nemoj" (Do not)	3:44
4.	"Pobednici" (Winners)	3:39
5.	"Mladost ne opravdava besvest" (Youth does not justify unconsciousness)	2:12
6.	"Uživaj" (Enjoy)	2:34
7.	"Zgodne kretnje" (Convenient movements)	3:16
8.	"Pečati" (Stamps)	4:00
9.	"Mozak" (Brain)	1:38
10.	"Javno veselje" (Public celebration)	4:08

=== Ja imam šarene oči ===
No.	Title	Length
11.	"Doboš 7 puta" (Snare drum 7 times)	2:39
12.	"Novac neće doći" (Money won't come)	3:13
13.	"Veruj meni!" (Trust me!)	3:41
14.	"Pristanište" (Peer)	1:41
15.	"Sviđa mi se..." (I like...)	2:21
16.	"Pregršt novca" (Plenty of money)	1:49
17.	"Vaspitanje" (Manners)	2:24
18.	"28. Jun 84!" (28 June 1984!)	4:46

=== Uživo (Lapidarij, Zg, 1982.) ===
No.	Title	Length
19.	"Sviđa mi se..." (I like...)	2:17
20.	"Mozak" (Brain)	1:23
21.	"Uživaj" (Enjoy)	2:57
22.	"Zgodne kretnje" (Convenient movements)	1:58
23.	"Javno veselje (početna verzija)" (Public celebration (early version))	2:32
