= Sviđa mi se da ti ne bude prijatno =

Studio album by Disciplina Kičme
- Released: 1983
- Recorded: 6–12 December 1982; Tivoli studio, Ljubljana
- Genre: Noise rock; post-punk
- Length: 31:20
- Label: Helidon; FLP 05-039
- Producer: Toni Jurij, Riki Rif, Disciplina Kičme

Disciplina Kičme chronology
| Sviđa mi se da ti ne bude prijatno (1983) | Ja imam šarene oči (1985) |

Sviđa mi se da ti ne bude prijatno (I like when you're not comfortable) is the debut album by the Serbian alternative rock band Disciplina Kičme, released by the Slovenian record label Helidon in 1983. A remastered version of the album was rereleased on CD on the compilation album Ove ruke nisu male... 1 in 2000.

== Track listing ==
| No. | Title | Length |
|---|---|---|
| 1. | "Nestani ih" (Disappear them) | 1:50 |
| 2. | "Ti znaš da tvoja soba ima četiri ugla" (You know that your room has four corners) | 1:19 |
| 3. | "Nemoj" (Do not) | 3:44 |
| 4. | "Pobednici" (Winners) | 3:39 |
| 5. | "Mladost ne opravdava besvest" (Youth does not justify unawareness) | 5:12 |
| 6. | "Uživaj" (Enjoy) | 2:34 |
| 7. | "Zgodne kretnje" (Convenient movements) | 3:16 |
| 8. | "Pečati" (Stamps) | 4:00 |
| 9. | "Mozak" (Brain) | 1:38 |
| 10. | "Javno veselje" (Public celebration) | 4:08 |

== Personnel ==
=== The band ===
- Koja (Dušan Kojić) — artwork by [cover], bass, vocals, lyrics by
- Žika (Srđan Todorović) — drums

=== Additional personnel ===
- Dragan Topolac — handclaps
- Ljubomir Đukić — handclaps
- G. Matić — photography
- Goran B. — photography
- Igor Petrović — photography
- S. Jakšić — photography
- Riki Rif (Nebojša Antonijević "Anton") — producer, handclaps
- Toni Jurij - producer, recorded by
