= Ove ruke nisu male... 2 =

Compilation album by Disciplina Kičme
- Released: 2005
- Recorded: 1985, April 1986; Druga Maca studio, Belgrade, Radio Belgrade Studio 6
- Genre: Funk rock; jazz fusion; noise rock; post-punk
- Length: 61:49
- Label: Tom Tom Music; DKCD02
- Producer: Koja

Disciplina Kičme chronology
Refresh Your Senses, NOW! (2001)	Ove ruke nisu male... 2 (2005)	Uživo sa Egzit-a! / Live At Exit! (2007)

Ove ruke nisu male... 2 (These hands are not small... 2) is the second compilation album by the Serbian alternative rock band Disciplina Kičme, released by Tom Tom Music in 2005. The compilation features the material released on the second studio album, Svi za mnom!, as well as unreleased material from the period, including a live version of "Ne, ne, ne", a cover of the Smetana violin theme "Humoreska" and unreleased soundtrack for the Želimir Žilnik 1985 film Lepe žene prolaze kroz grad, the band had recorded but never released. The first part of the compilation, Ove ruke nisu male... 1, was released in 2000 by the same record label.

== Track listing ==
=== Svi za mnom! ===
No.	Title	Length
1.	"Čudna šuma" (Strange forest)	4:29
2.	"Pozdrav mladoj žitarici" (Greetings to the young grain)	4:46
3.	"Zašto?" (Why?)	6:37
4.	"Ovo je zvuk..." (This is the sound)	4:03
5.	"Svi za mnom!" (Everybody, follow me!)	4:09
6.	"U kesi" (In a bag)	3:27
7.	"Šuma igra..." (The forest is dancing)	3:34
8.	"Ne, ne, ne..." (No, no, no...)	8:35

=== (Ne) Realizovana filmska muzika ===
No.	Title	Length
9.	"Tema I (fragmenti početne verzije "Ne, ne, ne")" (Theme I (fragments of the early version of "No, no, no"))	1:19
10.	"Tema II" (Theme II)	2:37
11.	"Tema III" (Theme III)	1:53
12.	"Tema IV" (Theme VI)	1:11
13.	"Tema V" (Theme V)	0:54
14.	"Tema VI" (Theme VI)	2:03
15.	"Tema VII" (Theme VII)	0:24
16.	"Tema VIII" (Theme VIII)	0:54
17.	"Tema IX" (Theme IX)	1:46
18.	"Tema X" (Theme X)	0:38
19.	"Tema XI" (Theme XI)	2:56

=== Plus ===
No.	Title	Length
20.	"Humoreska 1978!" (Humoresque 1978!, Smetana cover)	2:42
21.	"Ne, ne, ne (instrumental uživo 1986, Akademija)" (No, no, no (instrumental live 1986, Akademija))	2:52
