= Zeleni Zub na Planeti Dosade =

Studio album by Disciplina Kičme
- Released: 1989
- Recorded: November 1988 – January 1989; Ša-Na-Na studio, Belgrade
- Genre: Funk rock; jazz fusion; noise rock; post-punk
- Length: 28:46
- Label: PGP RTB; 210633
- Producer: Zeleni Zub

Disciplina Kičme chronology
Dečija pesma (1988)	Zeleni Zub na Planeti Dosade (1989)	Nova iznenađenja za nova pokolenja (1991)

Professional ratings
Review scores
Source	Rating
Ritam	5/5 stars

Zeleni Zub na Planeti Dosade (Green Tooth on the Boredom Planet) is the third album by the Serbian alternative rock band Disciplina Kičme, released by the Serbian record label PGP RTB in 1989.

== Track listing ==
All tracks written by Koja.

No.	Title	Length
1.	"Tata i mama" (Dad and Mum)	3:50
2.	"Zeleni Zub" (Green Tooth)	2:41
3.	"Betmen, Mandrak, Fantom" (Batman, Mandrake, Phantom)	3:18
4.	"Manitua mi" (I swear to Manitu)	4:44
5.	"Ukus nestašnih" (The taste of the playful)	1:05
6.	"Ah kakva sreća" (Oh, what joy)	2:49
7.	"Planeta Dosade" (Boredom Planet)	3:34
8.	"Iza 9 Brda" (Behind 9 hills)	2:36
9.	"Glas Nestašnih" (The voice of the playful)	2:50
10.	"Tata i mama 2" (Dad and Mum 2)	2:09

== Personnel ==
=== The band ===
- Koja (Dušan Kojić) — bass, vocals, written by
- Dule (Dušan Dejanović) — drums
- Kuzma (Jurij Novoselić) — saxophone [alt]
- Zerkman (Zoran Erkman) — trumpet

=== Additional personnel ===
- Stanislav Milojković — photography
- Šane (Dušan Petrović) — producer
- Zeleni Zub (Dušan Kojić) — producer
- Vinetu — producer
