= Dečija pesma =

EP by Disciplina Kičme
- Released: 21 December 1987
- Recorded: 1987; Šašana, O and Akademija
- Genre: Funk rock; jazz fusion; noise rock; post-punk
- Length: 22:34
- Label: PGP RTB; 2123045
- Producer: Zeleni Zub

Disciplina Kičme chronology
Najlepši hitovi! Uživo! (1987)	Dečija pesma (1987)	Zeleni Zub na Planeti Dosade (1990)

Dečija pesma (English: Children’s Song) is the second EP by the Serbian alternative rock band Disciplina Kičme, released by the Serbian record label PGP RTB in 1987. The EP features five different versions of the song "Dečija pesma", children, disco, early, hit and superior mix of the track. The song lyrics featured the verse "Nije dobro Bijelo Dugme; Nije dobra Katarina; Šta je dobro; Šta nam treba; Kičme, Kičme Disciplina") ("Bijelo Dugme is not good; Neither is Katarina; What is good; What we need; Kičme, Kičme Disciplina"). As guests on the EP appeared YU grupa guitarist Dragi Jelić, Ivan Vdović "VD", Srđan Todorović, who by that time was playing in Ekatarina Velika, and Roze Poze guitarist Željko Nikolić. Ironic cover versions of Robert Palmer's "Addicted to Love" and The Cult single "Love Removal Machine", recorded live at the Akademija club, also appeared on the EP.

== Track listing ==
All tracks written by Zeleni Zub, except tracks 3, written by Ian Astbury and Billy Duffy, and 6, written by Robert Palmer.

No.	Title	Length
1.	"Dečija pesma II - 3hit miks" (Children song II - 3hit mix)	3:35
2.	"Dečija pesma IV - dečiji miks" (Children song IV - children mix)	3:24
3.	"Love Removal Machine - uživo" (The Cult cover - live)	2:50
4.	"Dečija pesma V - Disko miks" (Children song)	3:36
5.	"Dečija pesma III - superioran miks" (Children song III - superior mix)	3:21
6.	"Addicted To Love - uživo" (Robert Palmer cover - live)	2:57
7.	"Dečija Pesma I - početni miks" (Children song I - initial mix)	3:28

== Personnel ==
=== The band ===
- Koja (Dušan Kojić) — bass, vocals, artwork by [cover], conversation [voice] (track 4)
- Kele (Nenad Krasovac) — drums (tracks 3, 6, 7)
- Dedža — trumpet (tracks 3, 6, 7)
- Zerkman (Zoran Erkman) — trumpet (tracks 1, 2, 3, 5, 6, 7)

=== Additional personnel ===
- Zeleni Zub (Dušan Kojić) — music by, lyrics by, producer
- Žika (Srđan Todorović) — drums (tracks 1, 5)
- Zorica Batin-Đukanović — photography
- Šane (Dušan Petrović) — recorded by (tracks 1, 2, 4, 5), conversation [voice] (track 4)
- Đuka (Dušan Đukić) — drums [intro bass drum] (track 1)
- Borovnica — viola (track 1)
- Željko Nikolić — guitar [slide] (track 2)
- Vd (Ivan Vdović) — drum programming [Rx5 Yamaha], voice [conversation] (track 4)
- Dragi Jelić — guitar [solo] (track 5)
- Kuzma (Jurij Novoselić) — saxophone [alto] (track 5)
- Vlada Negovanović — recorded by (track 7)
