= Ja imam šarene oči =

EP by Disciplina Kičme
- Released: 1985
- Recorded: September 1983, Druga Maca studio, Belgrade; June 28, 1984, SKC, Belgrade
- Genre: Noise rock; post-punk; funk rock
- Length: 22:34
- Label: Dokumentarna; DOK P-4
- Producer: Disciplina Kičme, Darko, Cvele

Disciplina Kičme chronology
Sviđa mi se da ti ne bude prijatno (1983)	Ja imam šarene oči (1985)	Svi za mnom! (1986)

Professional ratings
Review scores
Source	Rating
Džuboks	Highly favorable

Ja imam šarene oči (I have colorful eyes) is the first EP by the Serbian alternative rock band Disciplina Kičme, released by the Slovenian record label Dokumentarna in 1985. A remastered version of the EP was rereleased on CD on the compilation album Ove ruke nisu male... 1 in 2000.

== Track listing ==
All tracks written by Zeleni Zub.

No.	Title	Length
1.	"Doboš 7 puta" (Snare drum 7 times)	2:39
2.	"Novac neće doći" (Money won't come)	3:13
3.	"Veruj meni!" (Trust me!)	3:41
4.	"Pristanište" (Pier)	1:41
5.	"Sviđa mi se..." (I like...)	2:21
6.	"Pregršt novca" (Plenty of money)	1:49
7.	"Vaspitanje" (Manners)	2:24
8.	"28. Jun 84!" (June 28, 1984!)	4:46

== Personnel ==
=== The band ===
- Koja (Dušan Kojić) — bass, vocals, bells
- Žika (Srđan Todorović) — drums, percussion [tambourine]

=== Additional personnel ===
- Zeleni Zub (Dušan Kojić) — music by, lyrics by, artwork by [cover]
- Kele (Nenad Krasavac) — handclaps, drums on tracks 5 and 9
- Đorđe Kostić — handclaps
- Igor Petrović — photography
- Darko (Darko Milojković) — producer, handclaps
- Enco Lesić — recorded by
- Cvele (Miroslav Cvetković) — producer, recorded by
- Jugoslav Muškinja — trumpet
