= Nova iznenađenja za nova pokolenja =

Studio album by Disciplina Kičme
- Released: 1991
- Recorded: November 1990
- Studio: Guru Saund Zvuka studio, Novi Sad
- Genre: Funk rock; jazz fusion; noise rock; post-punk
- Length: 41:27
- Label: PGP RTB; 511170
- Producer: Zeleni Zub

Disciplina Kičme chronology
Zeleni Zub na Planeti Dosade (1990)	Nova iznenađenja za nova pokolenja (1991)	I Think I See Myself On CCTV (1996)

Nova iznenađenja za nova pokolenja (New surprises for new generations) is the fourth album by the Serbian alternative rock band Disciplina Kičme, released by the Serbian record label PGP RTB in 1990. This is the last album to feature the name Disciplina Kičme, as the following releases were released under the alternative band name Disciplin A Kitschme.

== Track listing ==
All tracks by Zeleni Zub, except track 7, written by Pop Mašina.

No.	Title	Length
1.	"Himna" (Anthem)	4:12
2.	"Buka u modi" (Noise in fashion)	3:49
3.	"Da li znaš za neki drugi ritam" (Have you ever heard of any other rhythm)	5:00
4.	"Goč, skreč + bubanj" (Goč, scratch + drums)	2:21
5.	"Čovek sa visokom temperaturom" (A high temperature man)	3:28
6.	"Ufo, grlo, nos" (UFO, throat, nose)	4:00
7.	"Zemlja svetlosti" (The land of light)	2:42
8.	"Zar je to sve" (Is that all)	3:37
9.	"No misteri at ol" (No mystery at all)	3:37
10.	"Zlopamtilo" (Grudge-bearer)	4:12
11.	"Prijatelj sa maštom" (A friend with imagination)	3:08
12.	"Manitua Mi II" (I swear to Manitou II)	4:45

== Personnel ==
=== The band ===
- Sai Baba (Dušan Kojić) — bass, vocals, written by
- Gul Tantor (Srđan Gulić) — drums
- Jy Robokapov (Jurij Novoselić) — saxophone [alt]
- Žele Zerkman (Zoran Erkman) — trumpet

=== Additional personnel ===
- Zeleni Zub (Dušan Kojić) — music by, lyrics by, producer
- Milan Ćirić — recorded by
- Vlada (Vladimir Žežel) — recorded by
- Đuka — drums [tapan] on the tracks 2, 4, 6 and 11
- Bilja B. (Biljana Babić) — drums on track 7
- Maša Ž. (Maša Žilnik) — backing vocals on tracks 8 and 10
- Vesna B. (Maša Žilnik) — backing vocals on tracks 8 and 10
- Vinetu — backing vocals on track 8

== Legacy ==
In 2000, the song "Buka u modi" was polled No.88 on Rock Express Top 100 Yugoslav Rock Songs of All Times list.
