= Najlepši hitovi! Uživo! =

Live album by Disciplina Kičme
- Released: January 12, 1987
- Recorded: November 3 & 4, 1986; Akademija, Belgrade
- Genre: Funk rock; jazz fusion; noise rock; post-punk
- Length: 33:53
- Label: PGP RTB; 2122618
- Producer: Koja, Kele, Branko Potkonjak

Disciplina Kičme chronology
Svi za mnom! (1986)	Najlepši hitovi! Uživo! (1987)	Dečija pesma (1988)

Najlepši hitovi! Uživo! (Prettiest hits! Live!) is the first live and only live album by the Serbian alternative rock band Disciplina Kičme, released by the Serbian record label PGP RTB in 1987.

== Track listing ==
All music and lyrics by Zeleni Zub, except track 7, written by Yu Grupa, and track 9, written by Neal Hefti.

No.	Title	Length
1.	"Zašto" (Why)	5:30
2.	"Novac neće doći" (Money won't come)	4:46
3.	"Nemoj" (Do not)	3:54
4.	"Svi za mnom!" (Everybody, follow me!)	3:59
5.	"Ne, ne, ne" (No, no, no)	7:15
6.	"Mozak" (Brain)	1:52
7.	"Čudna šuma" (Strange forest)	4:36
8.	"Betmen" (Batman)	2:55

== Personnel ==
=== The band ===
- Koja (Dušan Kojić) — bass, vocals
- Kele (Nenad Krasavac) — drums, vocals, mixed by
- Dedža — trumpet
- Zerkman (Zoran Erkman) — trumpet

=== Additional personnel ===
- Branko Potkonjak — engineer, mixed by
- Zeleni Zub (Dušan Kojić) — written by (tracks 1 to 6), artwork by [cover]
