= Peter Warren (New Zealand musician) =

Peter Warren (born 1958) New Zealand drummer primarily known as the drummer for DD Smash. Warren is also known by the nicknames 'Rooda' and 'Beat'. With a career spanning decades, Warren has been described as 'one of New Zealand's finest rock drummers.'

When he was 14 years old, Warren formed a band with other Westlake Boys High School students including a young Don McGlashan, called Ethos. Warren played drums and sang.

In the late 1970s Warren was the drummer, lead singer, and songwriter of the band Lip Service, during which time fellow band member The Future coined his nickname Rooda. Lip Service were managed by Charlie Grey, who also managed Th' Dudes, one of New Zealand's top pop/rock bands of that time. Lip Service often supported Th' Dudes at concerts, which is where Warren met future DD Smash band-leader Dave Dobbyn. Lip Service signed to CBS records for a four-record deal, though the only album released was their self-titled debut album which sold poorly.

In 1981 Dave Dobbyn had decided to leave Th' Dudes and approached Warren and Lip Service bandmate Rob Guy (Revox) to form a new band, DD Smash, which initially also included Lisle Kinney previously of Hello Sailor (band). DD Smash lasted for eight years, with three albums being released which sold well in New Zealand and Australia. Their first album, Cool Bananas, debuted at No. 1. in the New Zealand music charts. In 1982 DD Smash won the award for Top Group at the New Zealand Music Awards. Later, in Australia,

After he left DD Smash, Warren was involved with projects including: Pop Mechanix, the band Rooda (named after his nickname), 'all star collection' The Party Boys., toured New Zealand, Australia, the United Kingdom, and United States with guitarist Midge Marsden, and joined Serbian band Disciplin A Kitschme.

Since 2016 Warren has been drumming for reformed New Zealand band The Narcs. In 2017 Warren drummed for Tony Painting's Deep Purple Project. In 2018 he drummed in a tribute for late Hello Sailor frontman Graham Brazier.
