= Svi za mnom! =

Studio album by Disciplina Kičme
- Released: 1986
- Recorded: April 1986; Druga Maca studio, Belgrade
- Genre: Funk rock; noise rock; post-punk
- Length: 45:14
- Label: Helidon; FLP 05-060
- Producer: Zeleni Zub

Disciplina Kičme chronology
Ja imam šarene oči (1985)	Svi za mnom! (1986)	Najlepši hitovi! Uživo! (1987)

Svi za mnom! (Everybody, follow me!) is the second album by the Serbian alternative rock band Disciplina Kičme, released by the Slovenian record label Helidon in 1986, and reissued on CD by the record label in 1997. A remastered version of the album was rereleased on CD on the compilation album Ove ruke nisu male... 2 in 2005.

== Track listing ==
All music and lyrics by Zeleni Zub, except track 1, written by YU grupa.

No.	Title	Length
1.	"Čudna šuma" (Strange forest)	4:29
2.	"Pozdrav mladoj žitarici" (Greetings to the young grain)	4:46
3.	"Zašto?" (Why?)	6:37
4.	"Ovo je zvuk..." (This is the sound)	4:03
5.	"Svi za mnom!" (Everybody, follow me!)	4:09
6.	"U kesi" (In a bag)	3:27
7.	"Šuma igra..." (The forest is dancing)	3:34
8.	"Ne, ne, ne..." (No, no, no...)	8:35

== Personnel ==
=== The band ===
- Koja (Dušan Kojić) — bass, vocals
- Žika (Srđan Todorović) — drums
- Kele (Nenad Krasavac) — drums
- Dedža — trumpet, vocals
- Zerkman (Zoran Erkman) — trumpet, vocals

=== Additional personnel ===
- Duca — photography
- S. Milojković — photography
- Vlada Negovanović — recorded by
- Darko M. (Darko Milojković) — vocals on track 1
- Banana (Branislav Petrović) — vocals on track 1
- Boye — vocals on track 8

== Legacy ==
In 2015, the Svi za mnom! album cover was ranked 95th on the list of 100 Greatest Album Covers of Yugoslav Rock published by web magazine Balkanrock.
