= Disciplin A Kitschme =

Serbian and Yugoslav rock band

- The last Disciplin A Kitschme line-up, from left to right: Manja Đorđević, Dušan Kojić "Koja", Igor Djeke and Rade Vulić

Background information
- Also known as: Disciplina Kičme, DAK, Tooth-Goofie-Nappy
- Origin: Belgrade, Serbia (1981–1995, 2005–2019); London, England (1995–2003)
- Genres: Post-punk; alternative rock; funk rock; jazz fusion; noise rock; drum and bass
- Years active: 1981–1991; 1995–2004; 2005–2019
- Labels: Helidon, Dokumentarna, PGP-RTB, Babaroga Records, PGP-RTS, Tom Tom Music, Exit Music
- Past members: Dušan Kojić; Srđan Marković; Nenad Krasavac; Srđan Todorović; Zoran Erkman; Dedža; Jugoslav Muškinja; Branislav Trivić; Dušan Dejanović; Jurij Novoselić; Srđan Gulić; Gofie Bebe; Peter Warren; Will Parker; Manja Đorđević; Miloš Velimir; Igor Djeke; Rade Vulić

Disciplin A Kitschme, originally known as Disciplina Kičme (Serbian Cyrillic: Дисциплина Кичме, transl. Backbone Discipline), was a Serbian and Yugoslav and, for a period of time, British rock band, formed in Belgrade in 1981. The band was noted for their unique and energetic sound, with bass guitar as the primary instrument and drawing inspiration from punk rock, funk, blues, jazz fusion, Motown, rap, the works of Jimi Hendrix, Yugoslav 1970s progressive and hard rock bands, and in the later phases of their career from jungle and drum and bass.

Disciplina Kičme was formed by bass guitarist and vocalist Dušan Kojić "Koja" as one of the two spin-offs of the seminal Yugoslav new wave band Šarlo Akrobata, the other being Ekatarina Velika. Initially, the band featured Kojić on bass and vocals, Srđan Marković "Đile" on bass and Nenad Krasavac on drums. Marković soon left the band, Disciplina Kičme continuing as a duo. Krasavac was later replaced by Srđan "Žika" Todorović, but returned to the band in the mid-1980s, the group performing with both Krasavac and Todorović on drums. The band's debut album, Sviđa mi se da ti ne bude prijatno, released in 1983 (recorded December 1982), presented the band's raw and minimalist sound, with Kojić's dominant bass lines combined with the aggressive sound of Todorović's drums, bringing cult following to the band. Since the band's third album, Svi za mnom!, released in 1986, the band's line-up included a brass section. With Svi za mnom! the group gained the attention of the media, and until the dissolution of Yugoslavia the band enjoyed significant mainstream popularity. With the outbreak of Yugoslav Wars, Kojić moved to London, where he reformed the band under the name Disciplin A Kitschme, featuring female vocalist Gofie Bebe and drummer Peter Warren. From 1995 to 2003, the band was based in London, releasing three studio albums (last one recorded in Belgrade), performing in Great Britain and occasionally touring former Yugoslav republics. In 2003, Kojić returned to Belgrade, where he reformed Disciplin A Kitschme with younger musicians, the last line-up of the band featuring Kojić on bass guitar and vocals, Manja Đorđević on vocals, Rade Vulić on drums and Igor Djeke on harmonica. Đorđević died in April 2019, and three months later, Kojić suffered a stroke from which he only partially recovered, and the band—although never officially announcing their disbandment—has not been active since.

== History ==
=== Dušan Kojić's beginnings (late 1970s and early 1980s) ===
Dušan Kojić "Koja" started his musical career in the late 1970s, in the band Limunovo Drvo (Lemon Tree), which would later evolve into new wave band Šarlo Akrobata. Consisting of Milan Mladenović (guitar, vocals), Kojić (bass guitar, vocals) and Ivica Vdović "Vd" (drums, vocals), Šarlo Akrobata was short-lived, participating in the seminal compilation album Paket aranžman (Package Deal) and releasing only one studio album, Bistriji ili tuplji čovek biva kad... (Brighter or Dumber a Man Gets When...). Nevertheless, the group became one of the most notable acts of the Yugoslav new wave scene.

During the late 1970s and early 1980s, Kojić also wrote for Džuboks magazine under the pseudonyms Novica Talasić (a pun coming from the Serbian language term novi talas, transl. new wave) and Zeleni Zub (Green Tooth). At the end of 1970s, he hosted discussions on new wave held in Belgrade's Students' Cultural Center and also worked as a DJ in Belgrade's Akademija club. He appeared in Jovan Živanović's 1979 film Radio Vihor zove Anđeliju (Radio Wind Calling Anđelija) and Miloš Radivojević's 1980 film The Promising Boy, writing a part of music for the latter.

=== Belgrade years (1981–1992) ===
After Šarlo Akrobata ended their activity in late 1981, Kojić formed the band Disciplina Kičme with former Urbana Gerila member Nenad Krasavac "Kele". The band featured Kojić on vocals and bass guitar and Krasavac on drums. The first line-up also featured another bass guitarist, former Radnička Kontrola and UKT member Srđan Marković "Đile", but after a short period of time, he left the band. The following year, Krasavac went to serve his mandatory stint in the Yugoslav army, and was replaced by former Radnička Kontrola and Centar drummer Srđan "Žika" Todorović. At the beginning of their career, the band occasionally performed with the alternative theatre troupe Kugla glumište (The Ball Theatre) from Zagreb.

The band recorded material for their debut album, but due to the non-commercial musical style, the major Yugoslav record labels refused it. Eventually, the band's first album, entitled Sviđa mi se da ti ne bude prijatno (I Like When You Feel Uncomfortable), was released in very small circulation by the independent record label Helidon in early 1983. The album was produced by Kojić with the help of Toni Jurij and Partibrejkers guitarist Nebojša Antonijević "Anton" (signed on the album as Riki Rif). The tracks "Uživaj" ("Enjoy"), "Zgodne kretnje" ("Attractive Movements"), "Mladost ne opravdava besvest" ("Youth Does Not Justify Senselessness") and "Nemoj" ("Do Not") presented the band's minimalist and raw but energetic sound. The album featured the song "Pečati" ("Stamps"), written by Kojić and originally performed by Šarlo Akrobata, but previously never recorded, which dealt with bureaucracy in socialist Yugoslavia. The song featured a part of the Yugoslav national anthem, "Hej Sloveni", as an homage to the Jimi Hendrix cover of "The Star-Spangled Banner". The album cover was designed by Kojić, and the band's future releases would feature his unique visual creations on the covers, inspired by comic book heroes and punk aesthetics. The album was quickly sold out, bringing to the band a cult following. In 1984, Kojić made an appearance in Slobodan Šijan's film Strangler vs. Strangler.

After the album release, the band continued performing in clubs of all major Yugoslav cities, and in 1985, they released the Mini LP Ja imam šarene oči (I Have Colorful Eyes) through the label Dokumentarna, recorded during 1983 and 1984, with the track "Novac neće doći" ("Money Will Not Come") as the most notable. Todorović did the drums and Krasavac appeared only on the intro for the track "Sviđa mi se..." ("I Like...") and on "28. jun 1984." ("28 June 1984"), the latter recorded live at Belgrade's Engineering Students' Club on the same date. Kojić produced the Mini LP and for the first time songs featured the trumpet, played by Jugoslav Muškinja. From this release onwards, all of the band releases would be produced by Kojić himself. In 1985, Kojić also debuted as producer on a non-Disciplina Kičme release, producing Partibrejkers debut album Partibrejkers I; during the following years, he would produce albums by Partibrejkers, Boye, S.T.R.A.H., Obojeni Program, Kontrabanda, Električni Orgazam, Sila, Popečitelji and other acts.

The band's third studio album, Svi za mnom! (Everybody, Follow Me!), released in 1986 by Helidon, brought some line-up and stylistic changes. The album was recorded with both Krasavac and Todorović on drums and with a brass section, featuring Zoran Erkman "Zerkman" and Dedža on trumpets and Branislav Trivić on saxophone, contributing to jazz influences on the record. Guest appearances featured Električni Orgazam guitarist Branislav Petrović "Banana" (on backing vocals), former Radnička Kontrola guitarist Darko Milojković (on percussion) and the members of the all-girl band Boye (on backing vocals); the members of Boye would continue to work with Disciplina Kičme on their future releases. A cover of the song "Čudna šuma" ("The Strange Forest"), originally recorded in 1973 by progressive/hard rock band YU Grupa, appeared as the opening track on the album. Kojić used violin, in the theme from a Humoresque by Antonín Dvořák on the track "Zašto" ("Why"), and acoustic guitar, on the instrumental version of "Čudna šuma", entitled "Šuma igra" ("The Forest Is Dancing"). The track "Ovo je zvuk" ("This Is The Sound") featured a part of the interview Kojić did for Vrnjačka Banja Radio, and "Ne, ne, ne" ("No, No, No") featured quotation from "Marš na Drinu" ("March on the Drina"), a Serbian patriotic World War I song. The tracks "Čudna šuma", "Zašto" and the title track saw large airplay, Svi za mnom! becoming the band's first release to gain large attention of the Yugoslav media.

After Svi za mnom! was released, drummer Krasavac left the band, moving to the United States (where he still resides), the band continuing to perform with Todorović on drums only. In early 1987, the band celebrated the fifth anniversary by releasing a live album, Najlepši hitovi! Uživo! (Prettiest Hits! Live!), recorded on 3 and 4 November 1986 (with Krasavac on drums) at the Belgrade club Akademija. Besides the band's own songs, the album featured the band's version of the title song from the 1966 Batman series, which would remain on the band's setlist in the future years. During one of two concerts, a cushion on the floor by the stage was set on fire by a cigarette butt, and the recording of sound engineer Dragan Popović (a former member of the Yugoslav band DAG) asking the audience to make way for a fire extinguisher can be heard on the album. The album, recorded with an eight channel technique without any additional studio works, was the band's first release to be issued by a major record label, PGP-RTB. During the same year, the debut album was rereleased on cassette by the Slovenija record label, and the band line-up changed, as the drummer Todorović joined Ekatarina Velika and was replaced by former Limunovo Drvo and Katarina II drummer Dušan Dejanović, and former Film and Dee Dee Mellow saxophonist Jurij Novoselić "Kuzma" replaced Dedža.

The new line-up recorded the EP Dečija pesma (Children Song), released through PGP-RTB in 1987, featuring five different versions of the title track: "children", "disco", "early", "hit" and "superior" mix of the song. The song lyrics featured the verses "Nije dobro Bijelo Dugme / Nije dobra Katarina / Šta je dobro, šta nam treba / Kičme, Kičme Disciplina") ("Bijelo Dugme is not good / Neither is Katarina / What is good, what we need / Kičme, Kičme Disciplina"). As guests on the EP appeared YU Grupa guitarist Dragi Jelić, Roze Poze guitarist Željko Nikolić, Kojić's former bandmate from Šarlo Akrobata Ivan Vdović "Vd" and Srđan Todorović. Ironic cover versions of Robert Palmer's "Addicted to Love" and The Cult's "Love Removal Machine", recorded live at the Akademija club, also appeared on the EP.

The album Zeleni Zub na Planeti Dosade (Green Tooth at the Planet of Boredom) was released in 1989 by PGP-RTB, titled after the pseudonym Zeleni Zub Kojić used while writing for Džuboks magazine. The tracks "Tata i mama" ("Dad and Mum"), "Ah, kakva sreća" ("Oh, What Happiness"), "Iza 9 brda" ("Behind 9 Hills") and "Betmen, Mandrak, Fantom" ("Batman, Mandrake, Phantom") became mainstream hits. In February 1990, Kojić appeared on MTV show 120 Minutes and the music video for the English language version of "Dečija pesma" was broadcast on the show. In the meantime, Kojić, with Vlada Divljan and Srđan Gojković "Gile", wrote the soundtrack for the omnibus film The Fall of Rock 'n' Roll. Kojić wrot the music for the segment "Ne šalji mi pisma" ("Don't Send Me Letters"), and, together with screenwriters Branko Vukojević and Goran Gajić, wrote screenplay for segments connecting the film's three stories, appearing in them as the superhero Zeleni Zub. At the time, he also had an exhibition of his covers, posters and illustrations in Students' Center in Zagreb.

The band's seventh studio album, Nova iznenađenja za nova pokolenja (New Surprises for New Generations), was recorded in November 1990 and released in early 1991. It featured former Haustor member Srđan Gulić "Gul" as the new drummer, and former Pop Mašina, Innamorata and Papatra drummer Dušan Đukić "Đuka" on goč as guest. The album featured the usage of sampled music: "Buka u modi" ("Noise in Fashion") featured sampled riff from the Yugoslav band Dah song "Noćna buka" ("Night Noise"), "Zlopamtilo" ("Grudge-Bearer") featured a part of the YU Grupa song "Bio jednom jedan pas" ("Once Upon a Time There Was a Dog"), and the cover of Pop Mašina song "Zemlja svetlosti" ("The Land of Light") featured the chorus from the Yugoslav band Time song "Rokenrol u Beogradu" ("Rock 'n' Roll in Belgrade"). "Buka u modi" was also released as a single with a different version of the track on the B-side. At the time, Kojić was also playing the guitar in the ad hoc band Kod Tri Balona (The Three Ballons), which featured Električni Orgazam guitarist Branislav Petrović "Banana" on bass guitar and on different occasions the drums were played by Srđan Todorović, Kokan Popović and Goran Čavajda "Čavke". The band performed cover versions of the songs by Yugoslav progressive and hard rock bands like YU Grupa, Pop Mašina, Buldožer, Smak and Atomsko Sklonište. Kojić at the time also organised jam sessions at the Akademija club with conceptual artist Kosta Bunuševac. The jam sessions were described by Kojić and Bunuševac as "noisy jam session cabaret" and were entitled Beogradska prevara uličnog i nadzemnog sjaja (The Belgrade Swindle of Street and Overground Splendor). The recording of the session held on 13 May 1990 was released on the album of the same title. In 1991, Kojić wrote music for the theatre play Prijateljstvo zanat najstariji (Friendship, the Oldest Trade) played in Bitef Thetare and directed by Ivana Vujić. The material, including Kojić's version of the song "Idu dani" ("Days Are Passing"), originally written by Vojislav "Voki" Kostić, was released on Kojić's solo EP Prijateljstvo zanat najstariji.

At the time of Nova iznenađenja za nova pokoljenja release, Disciplina Kičme enjoyed significant mainstream popularity. However, after the album release, due to the political situation in the country, the group disbanded, holding their last concerts in August 1991 in Koper and Pula. The following year, Kojić moved to London and Erkman moved to Netherlands. In March and June 1991, at the students' protest in Belgrade, Kojić's lyrics "Vreme je za pravdu / Vreme je za istinu" ("It is time for justice / It is time for the truth") were shouted as slogans, and the song "Buka u modi" became one of the unofficial anthems of the 1996–1997 protests in Belgrade.

=== London years (1995–2004) ===
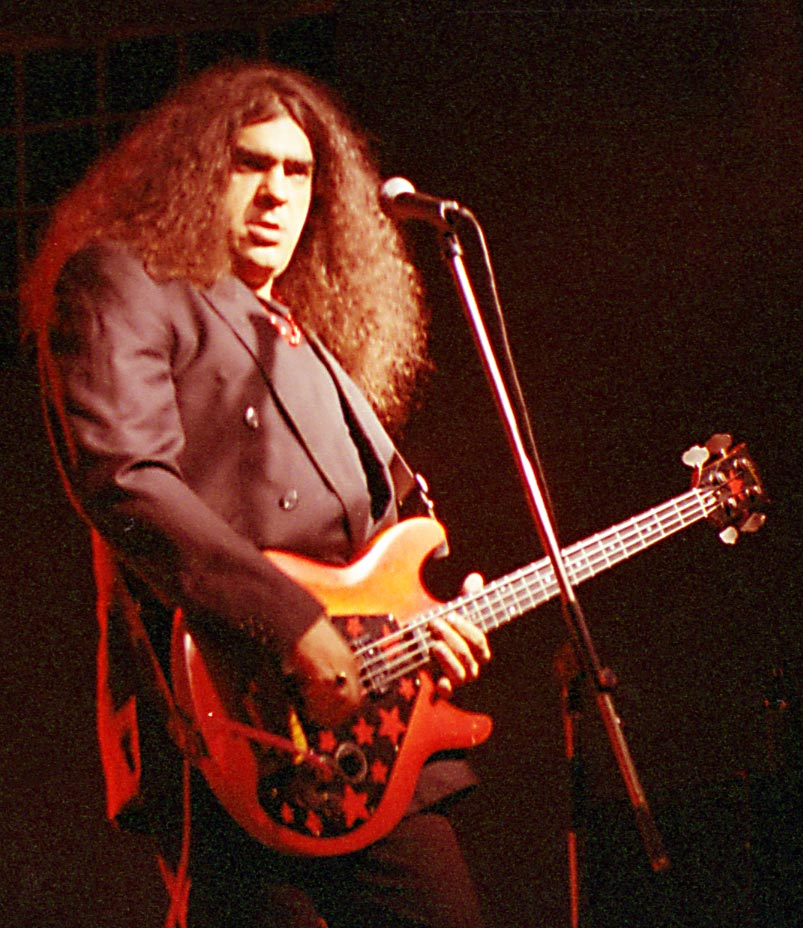
Dušan Kojić "Koja" in concert at Belgrade's Students' Cultural Center in 2000

At the beginning of his staying in London, Kojić performed instrumental rhythm & blues in London clubs with former Zabranjeno Pušenje keyboardist Džihan Dado. With three other Yugoslav emigrants, former Ekatarina Velika bassist Bojan Pečar, former Riblja Čorba guitarist and singer-songwriter Nikola Čuturilo and drummer Momo, he formed the band Lost Children, which performed covers of songs by Yugoslav 1970s rock bands. For a time, he worked with local musicians in the bands It's Good To Smoke and Brushstick Blues.

In 1995, Kojić decided to reform Disciplina Kičme. With the Grenadian singer Gofie Bebe and drummer Pete "Beat" Warren from New Zealand, he reformed the band with an altered name, Disciplin A Kitschme, Kojić himself adopting the stage name Black Tooth. Warren previously used to work with the Australian bands DD Smash and Pop Mechanix and various less-known American bands and Gofie Bebe debuted in Disciplin A Kitschme. The three met at a jam session in a local pub. The band performed in minor clubs in England and in the spring of 1996 they founded their own record label, Babaroga Records. Through Babaroga Records the band released the maxi single "Have You Ever Heard Of Any Other Rhythm?", featuring three versions of the title track, which was an English language version of the song "Da li znaš za neki drugi ritam", originally released on the album Nova iznenađenja za nova pokolenja. The single also featured the song "I've Got Those Technicolor Eyes", an English language version of "Ja imam šarene oči", originally released on the EP of the same name. During the years in London, the band joined in on the city's drum and bass scene, incorporating elements of the genre into their work.

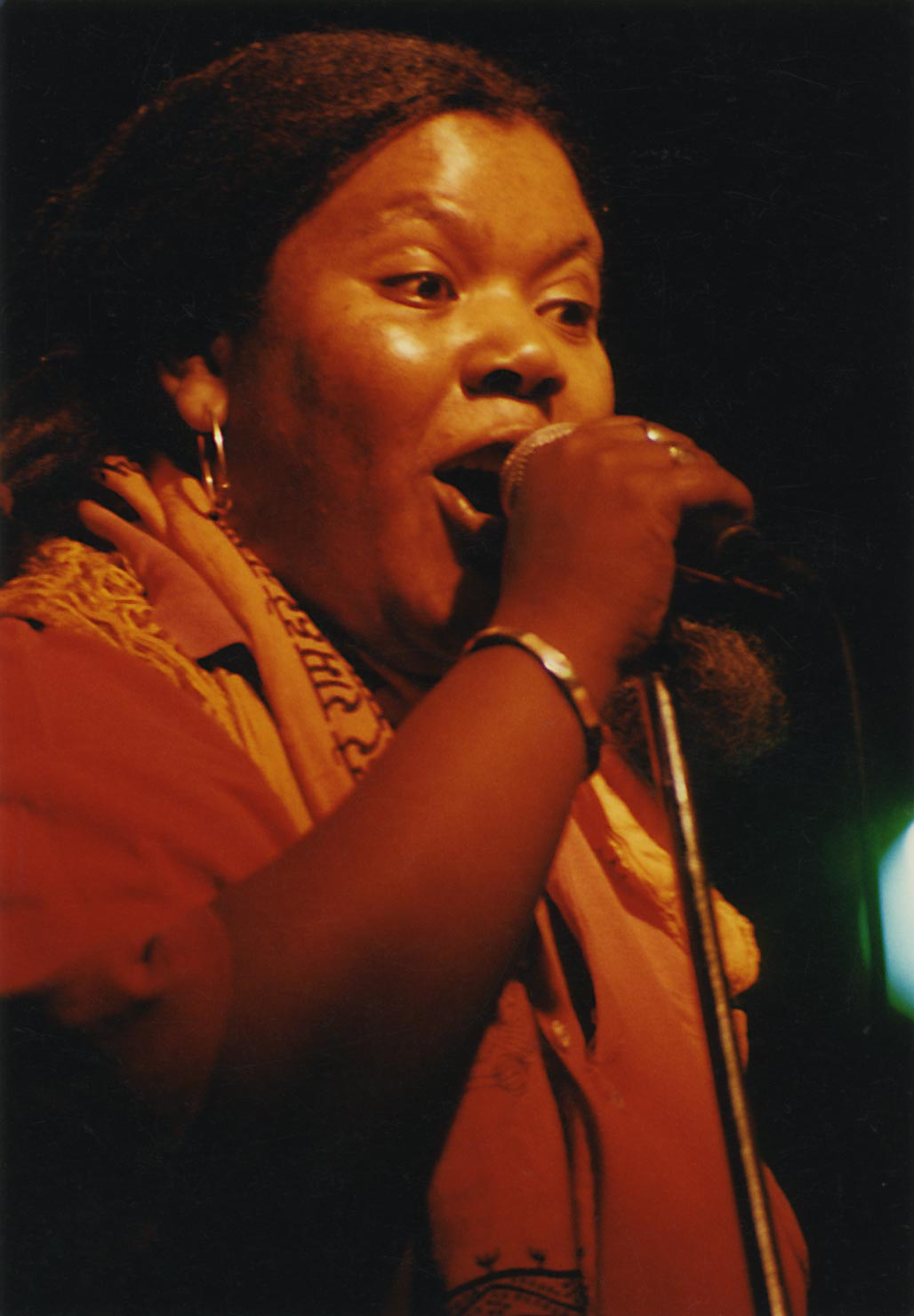
Gofie Bebe in concert at Belgrade's Students' Cultural Center in 2000

In November 1996, the band released the album I Think I See Myself On CCTV. The album title was inspired by the appearance of closed-circuit television cameras on the streets of London. The album featured the songs from the maxi single and English language versions of Disciplina Kičme old songs, "Do Not" ("Nemoj"), "Oh Why" ("Zašto"), "Children Song" ("Dečija pesma") and "Is That Really All?" ("Zar je to sve"). In 1997, the band released new versions of the songs "Do Not" and "Oh Why" as a single. The following year, the band released the album Heavy Bass Blues, which beside the new material featured a cover version of the John D. Loudermilk song "Tobacco Road" and new versions of two old Disciplina Kičme songs, "Noize In Fashion" ("Buka u modi") and "High Temperature Man" ("Čovek sa visokom temperaturom"). Co-producer of the album was Skip McDonald, who also did backing vocals on the track "Bedroom Muzik", featuring the lyrics "You got a mouse in your hand / You need no people in a band" as a comment on the media and record labels' attitude towards musicians.

In February and September 1997, the band performed in Serbia and partially the former Yugoslav republics. In 1998, Kojić wrote music for Radio Television of Serbia children's show Ogledi iz jezika (Language Experiments). The band returned to Serbia in late 1999, presenting the new drummer, Will Parker. In the meantime, they released a CD single featuring three versions of the song "Da Answer", signed as Tooth-Goofie-Nappy. During the same year, the record label Tom Tom Music released the compilation Ove ruke nisu male... 1 (These Hands Are Not Small... 1), titled after a verse from "Dečija pesma" and featuring the first two Disciplina Kičme releases and a recording of the live appearance in Zagreb's Lapidarij. The band performed in Zagreb during February 2001, and as guests on the concert appeared the band's former member Jurij Novoselić "Kuzma" and former Haustor member Igor Pavlica. In 2000, Kojić also co-wrote the music for the British film Bodywork with Srđan Kurpjel.

In 2001, Disciplin A Kitschme released the album Refresh Your Senses, NOW!, featuring songs dealing with the new political situation in Serbia, like "D' Demoncracy Yeah" and "Surely They Won't Get Much... of My Sympathy". In 2002, Kojić took part in a tribute album to his former bandmate Milan Mladenović, recording a cover of Ekatarina Velika song "Zemlja" ("Land") with an ad hoc band named Crni Zub i Nova Moćna Organizacija (Black Tooth and New Mighty Organization). The London line-up of Disciplin A Kitschme continued performing live until 2004 when one of last show on which Disciplina was headliner was in Zagreb 23 December 2004 festival FijuBriju, than Kojić returned to Belgrade.

=== Back in Belgrade (2005–2019) ===
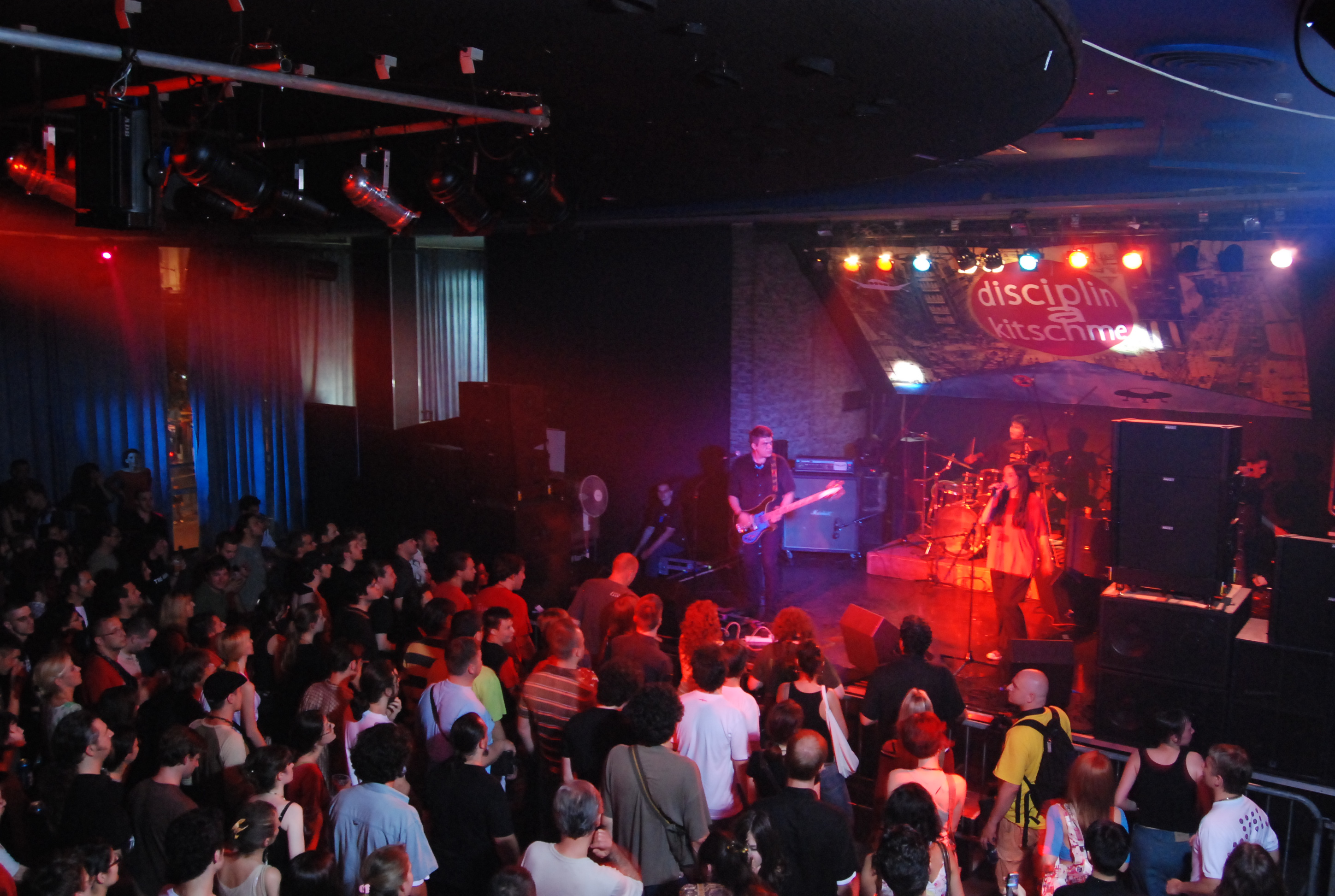
Disciplin A Kitschme performing in Belgrade in 2007

In 2004, Kojić returned to Belgrade and started working on several projects; during the year, he played guitar on the recording and produced the album Mene treba ovaj grad baš ovakvu kakva sam (This City Needs Me Just the Way I Am) by singer-songwriter Bojana Bulatović "Bo", and wrote music for 11 episodes of the Radio Television of Serbia educational young adult show Pravo da znam (My Right to Know). The following year, Tom Tom Music released Ove ruke nisu male... 2 (These Hands Are Not Small... 2), featuring the reissue of the album Svi za mnom! and as bonus tracks appeared the unreleased music Kojić recorded for Želimir Žilnik's film Pretty Women Walking Through the City. During the year, in Akademija club, Kojić held screenings of his short films, which were followed by jam sessions featuring Belgrade rock and jazz musicians. The events were entitled Fank-i-lastiš Crnog Zuba (Black Tooth's Funk-and-Rubber Band). Part of the recordings from these sessions was released in 2010 on the DVD Fank-i-lastiš Crnog Zuba by MCF Records.

In 2005, a new line-up of Disciplin A Kitchme, featuring Kazna Za Uši vocalist Manja Đorđević, former Sunshine, Partibrejkers and Električni Orgazam drummer Miloš Velimir "Buca" and percussionist PP (who spent only a short time with the band), recorded the band's comeback single "Političari + virusi" ("Politicians + Viruses"), released by Tom Tom Music in 2005, featuring the "TV mix", "antivirus" and instrumental version of the track. On 10 July 2005, the band performed on the main stage at the EXIT Festival. The recording of the performance was released on the Uživo sa Egzit-a! / Live at Exit! DVD by PGP-RTS in 2006.

In 2007, Disciplin A Kitchme released their eight studio album, Kada kažeš muzika, na šta tačno misliš, reci mi? (When You Say Music, of What Exactly do You Think, Tell Me?). The album was conceptual, mainly dealing with the growing popularity of MP3 music, especially in the songs "Bunt" ("Riot"), "Info" and "Neko mora to da spreči" ("Somebody Has to Stop It"). The album also featured a new version of "Političari + Virusi". After the album release, the band started touring and performed at the 42nd Gitarijada, the 2008 EXIT Festival, Jelen Pivo Live and other festivals as well as on their own concerts held in Serbia and abroad.

On 5 July 2011, the band released their ninth studio album, Uf!, through Exit Music. The album, featuring more classic rock-inspired sound that the band's previous several releases, was announced by the single "Ako ti je glasno" ("If it is Too Loud for You"), released in June 2011 for free digital download via the same record label. On 28 May 2013, the former member Zoran Ekrman "Zerkman" died at the age of 50, three days after his guest appearance on the Disciplin A Kitschme performance in Belgrade. In November 2013, the band released the DVD entitled Video Uf!. The DVD featured three previously released videos for songs from Uf! and six new videos for the rest of the songs from the album, as well as audio recordings from the recording of Uf! and an interview. The DVD was given as gift with an issue of Vreme magazine. The following month, the band streamed via Deezer the single "Samo Disciplina" ("Discipline Only"), on which debuted the band's new member, harmonica player Igor Djeke.

In January 2014, the band released the box set entitled Ove ruke nisu male 3, containing remastered editions of Zeleni Zub na Planeti Dosade, Nova iznenađenja za nova pokolenja, Najlepši hitovi! Uživo! and Dečja pesma, all featuring bonus recordings. The box set also features the DVD disc entitled Ove ruke nisu male... 3, which features video recordings from concerts and various video clips from the 1980s and the 1990s. In December of the same year, Kojić recorded a cover of the song "Neukusu treba reći NE!" ("We Should Say NO to Bad Taste!"), originally released on Uf!, with children choir Čuperak (Tuft), as a part of Deca pevaju rokenrol (Children Sing Rock 'n' Roll) project. Kojić sung, played slide guitar, mixed, arranged and produced the new version. On 13 March 2015, on the band's promotional concert in Zagreb, the band was joined on stage by former members Jurij Novoselić and Srđan Gulić, drummer Igor Pavlica and trumpet player Nikola Santro.

In March 2016, the band released their ninth studio album, Opet (Again). The album was previously announced by the single "Zaboravili rokenrol!?!" ("Forgot about Rock 'n' Roll!?!"), released in November 2015 and featuring British musicians Lord Eric Sugumugu and Robert Goldsmith on percussion. The album featured the new drummer, Rade "Vula" Vulić.

In March 2019, Mascom record label released all three albums from the band's London phase on vinyl records, each as a double album containing bonus material. On 23 April 2019, Manja Đorđević died at the age of 51. In July 2019, Kojić suffered a stroke during his staying in Great Britain, after which he was put into induced coma. On 18 and 26 October 2019, Serbian musicians held two concerts in Belgrade as a sign of support for Kojić. The concerts, held in Elektropionir and SubBeerni Centar clubs respectively, featured Električni Orgazam, Rambo Amadeus, Artan Lili, Repetitor, Obojeni Program, Kanda Kodža i Nebojša, Eyesburn, Nikola Čuturilo, Dža ili Bu, Čovek Bez Sluha and other acts. Although Kojić partially recovered, he has not returned to performing and recording.

== Legacy ==
In March and June 1991, at the students' protest in Belgrade, Kojić's lyrics "Vreme je za pravdu / Vreme je za istinu" ("It is time for justice / It is time for the truth") were shouted as slogans, and the song "Buka u modi" became one of the unofficial anthems of the 1996–1997 protests in Belgrade.

Disciplina Kičme song "Manitua mi II" ("By Manitou II") was covered by Serbian alternative rock band Kanda, Kodža i Nebojša on the various artists cover album Korak napred 2 koraka nazad (A Step Forward 2 Steps Backwards).

In 1998, the album Zeleni Zub na Planeti Dosade was polled No. 32, Sviđa mi se da ti ne bude prijatno was polled No. 52 and Svi za mnom! was polled No. 65 on the list 100 Greatest Albums of Yugoslav Popular Music, published in the book YU 100: najbolji albumi jugoslovenske rok i pop muzike (YU 100: The Best albums of Yugoslav pop and rock music). In 2015, Nova iznenađenja za nova pokolenja was pronounced the 12th and Sviđa mi se da ti ne bude prijatno 31st on the list of 100 greatest Yugoslav albums, published by Croatian edition of Rolling Stone. In 2021 the band's album I Think I See Myself on CCTV was polled No. 38, the album Kada kažeš muzika, na šta tačno misliš, reci mi? was polled No. 44, the album Uf! was polled No. 55 and the album Opet was polled No. 78 on the list of 100 Best Serbian Albums Since the Breakup of SFR Yugoslavia. The list was published in the book Kako (ni)je propao rokenrol u Srbiji (How Rock 'n' Roll in Serbia (Didn't) Came to an End). In 1987, in YU legende uživo (YU Legends Live), a special publication by Rock magazine, Najlepši hitovi! Uživo! was pronounced one of 12 best Yugoslav live albums.

In 2000, the song "Buka u modi" was polled No. 88 on Rock Express Top 100 Yugoslav Rock Songs of All Times list. The B92 Top 100 Domestic Songs list features two songs by the band: "Dečija pesma", polled No. 49, and "Nemoj", polled No. 63.

The lyrics of 4 songs by the band were featured in Petar Janjatović's book Pesme bratstva, detinjstva & potomstva: Antologija ex YU rok poezije 1967 - 2007 (Songs of Brotherhood, Childhood & Offspring: Anthology of Ex YU Rock Poetry 1967 – 2007).

== Discography ==
- Sviđa mi se da ti ne bude prijatno (1983)
- Ja imam šarene oči (1985)
- Svi za mnom! (1986)
- Dečija pesma (1987)
- Zeleni Zub na Planeti Dosade (1989)
- Nova iznenađenja za nova pokolenja (1991)
- I Think I See Myself On CCTV (1996)
- Heavy Bass Blues (1998)
- Refresh Your Senses, NOW! (2001)
- Kada kažeš muzika, na šta tačno misliš, reci mi? (2007)
- Uf! (2011)
- Opet. (2015)
