= PGP-RTS =

Serbian record label

- Founded: 1958 (as PGP-RTB); 1993 (as PGP-RTS)
- Genre: Various
- Country of origin: Serbia
- Location: Belgrade
- Official website: pgp-rts.rs

PGP-RTS (Serbian Cyrillic: Продукција грамофонских плоча Радио телевизије Србије, romanized: Produkcija gramofonskih ploča Radio televizije Srbije lit. 'Production of gramophone records of Radio Television of Serbia') is a major record label based in Belgrade, Serbia. It is a successor of PGP-RTB which was established in 1959 in Belgrade, then capital of Socialist Republic of Serbia and Socialist Federal Republic of Yugoslavia.

After the breakup of Yugoslavia, in 1993, the company changed its name to PGP-RTS, which is the music production branch of the Radio Television of Serbia.

== Artists ==
PGP-RTB is notable for signing numerous eminent Serbian pop, rock and folk acts. Some of the artist currently signed to PGP-RTS, or have been so in the past, include:

- Alisa
- Amajlija
- Atheist Rap
- Babe
- Nedeljko Bajić
- Balkanika
- Bjesovi
- Bebi Dol
- Cactus Jack
- Zdravko Čolić
- Deca Loših Muzičara
- Dino Merlin
- Disciplina Kičme
- Dragoljub Đuričić
- Dža ili Bu
- Haris Džinović
- Električni Orgazam
- Eyesburn
- Familija
- Galija
- Garavi Sokak
- Generacija 5
- Hari Mata Hari
- Hush
- Miroslav Ilić
- Emina Jahović
- Kanda, Kodža i Nebojša
- Kazna Za Uši
- Kerber
- Kraljevski Apartman
- Kristali
- Bilja Krstić
- Laki Pingvini
- Lira Vega
- Mama Rock
- Oliver Mandić
- Srđan Marjanović
- Dragana Mirković
- Negative
- Neverne Bebe
- Night Shift
- Osvajači
- Overdrive
- Partibrejkers
- Piloti
- Plejboj
- Dušan Prelević
- Nina Radojičić
- Nino Rešić
- Roze Poze
- Rubber Soul Project
- S.A.R.S.
- Sick Mother Fakers
- Smak
- Ana Stanić
- Super s Karamelom
- Trigger
- Vampiri
- Van Gogh
- Bisera Veletanlić
- YU Grupa
- Zana
- Zbogom Brus Li

== See also ==
- PGP-RTB
- List of record labels
