= Studentski kulturni centar (Belgrade) =

Studentski Kulturni Centar
- Студенски Културни Центар
- Interactive map of Studentski Kulturni Centar
- Location: Belgrade, Serbia
- Coordinates: 44.806309°N 20.4620479°E
- Owner: Belgrade
- Type: Cultural center

Construction
- Opened: 1971; 55 years ago

Website
- www.skc.org.rs

Studentski Kulturni Centar (English: Student's Cultural Center; abbr. SKC) is a cultural center in Belgrade, Serbia.

== History ==
The center opened in 1971 in the building of the former Officers' Club, that had up to that point been used by the State Security Administration (UDBA). The opening of SKC was seen by many as the communist regime's concession to the youth of Belgrade following the 1968 student demonstrations.
