= Dušan Kojić =

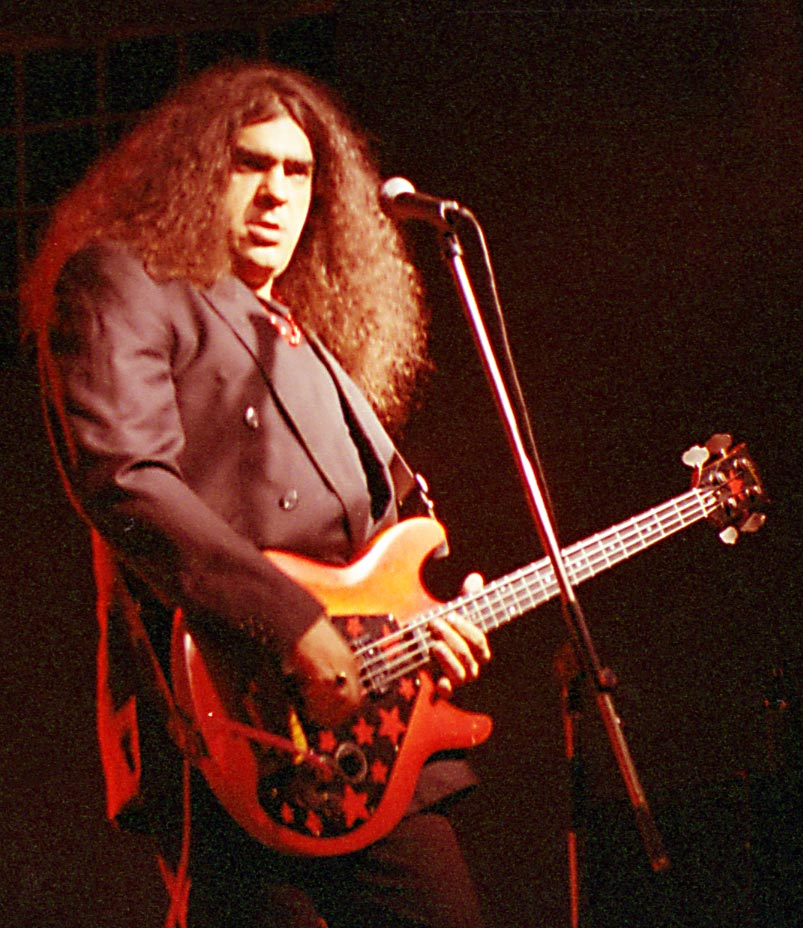
- Koja playing bass at a Disciplin A Kitschme concert in Belgrade's SKC in October 2007.

Background information
- Also known as: Koja, Koya, Zeleni Zub, Sai Baba, Crni Zub, Black Tooth
- Born: 14 June 1961 (age 65); Belgrade, PR Serbia, FPR Yugoslavia
- Genres: New wave, punk rock, funk rock, jazz fusion, noise rock, alternative rock, drum and bass
- Instruments: vocals, bass guitar, guitar, percussion, drums, keyboards, synthesizer, tambourine, organ, harmonica, piano
- Years active: 1979 - 2019

Dušan "Koja" Kojić (Serbian Cyrillic: Душан Којић Која; born 14 June 1961) is a Serbian rock bassist, singer, and songwriter. He is the frontman of the Serbian Alternative rock band Disciplin A Kitschme (formerly known as Disciplina Kičme).

== Discography ==
=== With Šarlo Akrobata ===
==== Singles ====
- "Mali čovek" / "Ona se budi" (1981)

==== Studio albums ====
- Bistriji ili tuplji čovek biva kad... (1981)

==== Compilation albums ====
- Paket aranžman (1980) - with Električni orgazam and Idoli

==== Other appearances ====
- Svi marš na ples! (1981)

=== Solo works ===
- Prijateljstvo zanat najstariji (1991) - EP
- Kako je propao rokenrol (1989) - with Vlada Divljan and Srđan Gojković
- Beogradska prevara! (2001)
- Kao da je bilo nekad...(posvećeno Milanu Mladenoviću) (2002) - with the band Nova Moćna Organizacija
