= Natur all =

Studio album by Cactus Jack
- Released: April 2004
- Recorded: Studio 5 PGP RTS, Belgrade; December 2003 / January 2004
- Genre: Hard rock
- Label: PGP-RTS
- Producer: Zoran Maletić

Cactus Jack chronology
Deep Purple Tribute (2003)	Natur all (2004)	Mainscream (2005)

Professional ratings
Review scores
Source	Rating
Barikada	link

Natur all is the first studio album by Serbian hard rock band Cactus Jack, released in 2004.

Preceded by live albums DisCover and Deep Purple Tribute, Natur all was the band's first album to feature their own material (although the band had previously published an EP with their own songs, Grad). Besides the band's own songs, Natur all featured a Serbian language cover of U2 song "Hold Me, Thrill Me, Kiss Me, Kill Me", entitled "Model donjeg veša" ("Lingerie Model"), and a cover of Led Zeppelin song "Kashmir".

Music for the song "Voodoo Magija" ("Voodoo Magic") was written by Petar Zarija, singer of the blues rock band Zona B. The album artwork was designed by Dragoljub "Paja" Bogdanović, who also sang backing vocals on the album; Bogdanović would in 2015 become Cactus Jack frontman.

== Track listing ==
No.	Title	Lyrics	Music	Length
1.	"Kraljica bordela" ("Brothel Queen")	Vladimir Jezdimirović	Stevan Birak	4:42
2.	"Izgubljen raj" ("Paradise Lost")	Vladimir Jezdimirović	Stevan Birak	3:36
3.	"Daleko si, baby, otišla" ("You've Gone Too Far, Baby")	Vladimir Jezdimirović	Stevan Birak	3:29
4.	"Model donjeg veša" ("Lingerie Model")	Vladimir Jezdimirović	U2	4:20
5.	"Pod nebom sam sam" ("I'm Alone Beneath the Sky")	Vladimir Jezdimirović	Stevan Birak	4:30
6.	"Sada il' nikada" ("Now or Never")	Vladimir Jezdimirović	Stevan Birak	4:18
7.	"Voodoo magija" ("Voodoo Magic")	Vladimir Jezdimirović	Petar Zarija	4:16
8.	"Mister-Twister"	Vladimir Jezdimirović	Stevan Birak	3:38
9.	"Dama Herc" ("Queen of Hearts")	Miodrag Krudulj	Stevan Birak	3:15
10.	"Kashmir"	John Bonham; Jimmy Page; Robert Plant	John Bonham; Jimmy Page; Robert Plant	4:56
11.	"Nekada" ("Some Time Ago")	Miodrag Krudulj	Stevan Birak	5:04

== Personnel ==
- Vladimir Jezdimirović – vocals
- Stevan Birak – guitar, backing vocals
- Miodrag Krudulj – bass guitar
- Dušan Gnjidić – drums
- Zoran Samuilov – keyboards, Hammond organ

=== Additional personnel ===
- Dragoljub "Paja" Bogdanović - backing vocals, cover design
- Zoran Maletić - producer
- Zoran Stefanović - sound engineer
- Radovan Maričić - recorded by
- Zoran Vukčević - recorded by, mixed by
- Zoltan Totka - photography
