= Srećno Novo UžiVo =

Live album by Van Gogh
- Released: 2007
- Genre: Rock
- Label: Hayat Production
- Producer: Vlada Negovanović

Van Gogh chronology
Kolo (2006)	Srećno Novo UžiVo (2007)	Lavirint (2009)

Srećno Novo UžiVo (trans. Happy New Live; also a word play, as Srećno Novo Uvo is Serbian for Happy New Ear, which is the title of Van Gogh's previous live album) is the third live album by Serbian rock band Van Gogh. The album was released in 2007 by Bosnia and Herzegovina record label Hayat Production.

== Track listing ==
All the songs were written by Zvonimir Đukić, except where noted.

1. "Puls" (Z. Đukić, S. Radivojević) - 4:01
2. "Spisak razloga" - 4:11
3. "Kolo" - 3:02
4. "Za godine tvoje" - 4:23
5. "Mama" - 4:37
6. "Opasan ples" (Z. Đukić, S. Habić) - 5:44
7. "Tanka nit" (Z. Đukić, S. Radivojević) - 3:49
8. "Neko te ima" (Z. Đukić, G. Milisavljević) - 5:23
9. "Brod od papira" - 4:41
10. "Basna" - 4:19
11. "Da li zna" - 5:23
12. "Zamisli" (Z. Đukić, S. Radivojević) - 4:47
13. "Ekstaza" - 3:57
14. "Zemlja čuda" (Z. Đukić, S. Radivojević, H. Peretti, G. D. Weiss) - 4:10
15. "Klatno" - 2:53

== Personnel ==
- Zvonimir Đukić - guitar, vocals
- Dejan Ilić - bass guitar
- Srboljub Radivojević - drums
