= Van Gogh (band) =

Serbian rock band

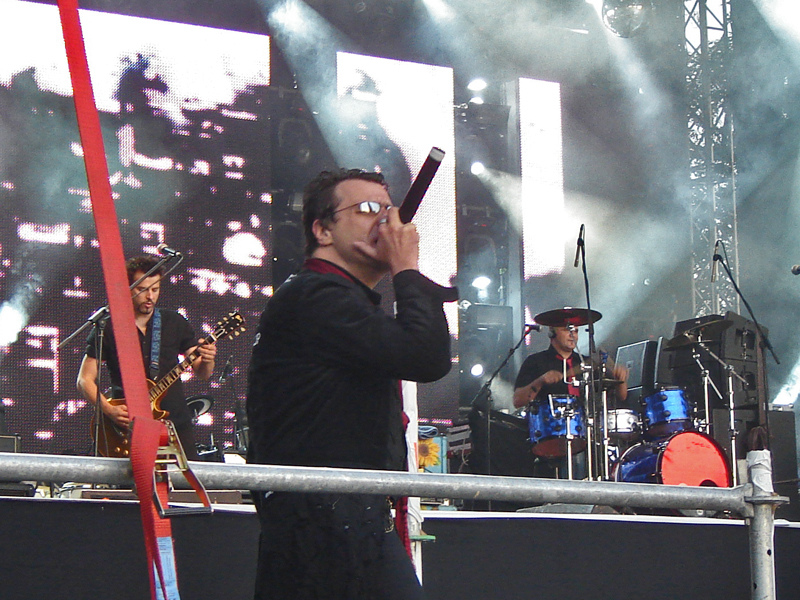
- Van Gogh performing live at the 2007 Novi Sad Exit festival

Background information
- Origin: Belgrade, Serbia
- Genres: Alternative rock, rock, electronic rock, power pop
- Years active: 1986–1987; 1990–present
- Labels: PGP-RTB, PGP-RTS, Metropolis Records, Hi-Fi Centar, Croatia Records, Gold Audio Video
- Members: Zvonimir Đukić “Đule” Srboljub Radivojević; Dragan Ivanović
- Past members: Đorđe Petrović; Goran Milisavljević; Predrag Popović; Miško Veličković; Aleksandar Barać; Vladan Cvetković; Vlada Barjaktarević; Dušan Bogović; Dejan Ilić; Branislav Gluvakov
- Website: www.musicvangogh.com

Van Gogh (Serbian: Ван Гог / Van Gog) is a Serbian and former Yugoslav rock band from Belgrade.

The band was formed in 1986, and released their debut alternative rock-oriented self-titled album during the same year. During the 1990s, the band released a number of well-received albums inspired mostly by the works of the band Ekatarina Velika, and in the 2000s the band adopted more commercial sound, becoming one of the top acts of the Serbian rock scene. Since the beginning of the band's career, vocalist and guitarist Zvonimir Đukić and drummer Srboljub Radivojević have been the mainstay members of the band.

== History ==
=== 1980s ===
The band was formed in 1986. The first lineup consisted of Zvonimir Đukić "Đule" (guitar), Srboljub Radivojević (drums), Đorđe Petrović (a former Zajedno member, keyboards), Goran Milisavljević (vocals), and Predrag Popović (a former Rock Ekspres member, bass guitar). In February 1986, the band released their debut single "Tragovi prošlosti" ("Traces of the Past"), and in May they appeared at Youth Festival in Subotica, performing songs "Tragovi prošlosti", "Tvoj smeh" ("Your Laughter") and "Menjam se" ("I'm Changing"), and winning the second place by the choice of the audience, and the third place by the choice of the jury. At the end of 1986 the band released their debut self-titled album. The album lyrics were written by Milisavjević, the music was written by Đukić, and the album was produced by Petrović. The album featured new versions of "Tragovi prošlosti", "Tvoj smeh" and "Menjam se". After a number of concerts Van Gogh disbanded. Before the 1990 reunion Đukić performed with Fit (participating in the recording of their debut album Uz rijeku), Ekatarina Velika (participating in the recording of their album Samo par godina za nas) and Nikola Čuturilo.

=== 1990s ===
Van Gogh reunited in 1990 and released the single "Gubiš me" ("You're Losing Me"), and in 1991 they released the album Svet je moj (The World Is Mine). The lineup which released the single and the album consisted of Đukić (vocals, guitar), Radivojević (drums), Aleksandar Barać (bass guitar), Vladan Cvetković (drums), and Vlada Barjaktarević (keyboards). The album featured Ekatarina Velika members Milan Mladenović and Margita Stefanović, Električni Orgazam member Zoran "Švaba" Radimirović, and Oktobar 1864 member Tanja Jovićević as guests. The music and most of the songs' lyrics was written by Đukić, and the album was produced by Barjaktarević. The album featured the hit "Neko te ima" ("Someone Has You"). The band released their third album Strast (Passion) in 1993 as a trio consisting of Đukić, Radivojević and Barać. Strast marked the band's shift towards mainstream rock sound. It was produced by Saša Habić, and it featured Rambo Amadeus, Marija Mihajlović and Pera Joe as guests. In 1995 the band released the compilation album Tragovi prošlosti (Traces of Past) which featured fifteen songs from their previous albums and the song "Zemlja čuda" ("Wonderland"), which was originally released as a single.

In 1996 the band released Hodi (Come), which featured more diverse sound than the band's previous releases, and artistic music videos were recorded for several songs. The music was written by Đukić, the song "Polje snova" was written by Saša Dragić, and a part of the songs' lyrics featured motifs from Momčilo Nastasijević's poetry. This album was also produced by Saša Habić, and it featured hits "Delfin" ("Dolphin"), "Hodi", "Kiselina" ("Acid"), "Apsolutno ne" ("Absolutely Not"). The album featured a live version of the song "Luna" ("Moon") and the instrumental track "Vertigo" as bonus tracks. In 1996, the band appeared on the Kornelije Kovač album Moja generacija (My Generation), with their version of Korni Grupa song "Jagode i maline" ("Strawberries and Raspberries"). In 1997 Van Gogh released the live album No Comment, which was recorded on 23 and 24 January 1997 in Belgrade's SKC. The album featured songs from all the periods of the band's career, but mostly from several last albums. The album was produced by Vlada Negovanović. In 1998 the band released the CD single which featured two acoustic versions of the song "Polje snova" ("Field of Dreams"), one of them having the French language title, "Qu'hier que demain". In 1998 Van Gogh was voted the Yugoslav Rock Band of the Year, and the live version of the song "Neko te ima" was voted the Rock Song of the Year in the YuMusic Internet Awards poll. In the meantime Aleksandar Barać, one of the starting members of the group, left the band to pursue life abroad.

In 1999 the band, featuring new bass guitarist, Dušan Bogović (a former Hush and Vasil Hadžimanov Band member), released Opasan ples (Dangerous Dance). The album was produced by Saša Habić, who also played keyboards and percussion on the album recording. Apart from singing and playing the guitar, Đukić also played bass guitar and mandolin. The album also featured bass guitarists Nenad Stefanović "Japanac" and Ryan Nemuryn as guests. The music was written by Đukić, Radivojević and Habić. The song "Pleme" ("Tribe") featured a quotation from the song "Sunshine Day" by Osibisa, and the song lyrics featured motifs from Desanka Maksimović poetry. The song "Demagogija" ("Demagogy") featured the chorus from the song "Pop Muzik" by M, and the song "Zauvek" ("Forever") featured elements of the traditional music of Cape Verde. At the same time a CD featuring the interview journalist Peca Popović recorded with Đukić and the song "Zemlja čuda" was released.

=== 2000s ===
In 2000, Dragan Ivanović became the band's new bass guitarist. In 2001, the band released the live album Happy New Ear, which was recorded on 19 December 1999 at the band's concert in Belgrade's Hala sportova. The album was produced by Vlada Negovanović. During the same year the band's first album was rereleased by Metropolis Records. In 2002, the band released the album DrUnder, which featured electronic rock elements. In 2003, the band was joined by the new bass guitarist Dejan Ilić. The same year the band held a concert at the full Tašmajdan Stadium.On 15 June 2004 Van Gogh performed as the opening band on Metallica concert held at Partizan Stadium in Belgrade.

In 2006 Van Gogh released Kolo. The album was named after the traditional folk dance from the Balkans, and the first single from the album was the folk-oriented "Kolo (Ludo luda)", the lyrics of which featured elements from the Serbian folk poem "Riba i devojka" recorded by Vuk Stefanović Karadžić. In the meantime Branislav Gluvakov (solo guitar) was introduced. In 2007, the band won the award for the Best Adriatic Act at the MTV Europe Music Awards 2007. The same year the band released live/video album Beogradska Arena / Live, which featured a recording of Van Gogh's concert held in Belgrade Arena on 19 May 2007. In 2009, Van Gogh released Lavirint through Mobile Telephony of Serbia, and during the first month of the sale it was sold in more than 100,000 copies. On 28 November 2009 the band held another concert at the full packed Belgrade Arena. This concert won the Concert of the year award at the Serbian Oscar Of Popularity.

=== 2010s and 2020s ===
In 2010, Dejan Ilić left the band and was replaced by Dragan Ivanović which was his second stint at Van Gogh. In 2011, the band celebrated 25 years of existence with the release of Total, which featured a CD with 17 songs and a DVD with 23 videos, released by Croatia Records for the Croatian market only.

In December 2013, the band released the album Neumeren u svemu (Unrestrained in Every Way). The album was previously announced by the single "Nešto vuče me dole" ("Something Drags Me Down"), released in May 2013 for free download from the band's official site. Van Gogh released the album as a duo, with Đukić and Radivojević as the only official members of the band. On the album recording, Đukić played guitar, bass guitar, keyboards and mandolin and sang lead vocals, and Radivojević played drums and sang backing vocals. In January 2014, the band released the video for the song "Anđele, moj brate" ("Angel, My Brother"), featuring actor Petar Božović. In 2014, a monography about the band, written by Đukić and Radivojević, entitled Van Gogh: Tragovi prošlosti, was published. In June Dejan Ilić rejoined Van Gogh. In October of the same year, the band won the Best Adriatic Act award at the 2014 MTV Europe Music Awards for the second time, thus becoming the first band to win the award two times. The award was handed to the band at the first of two sold-out concerts at the Ranko Žeravica Sports Hall on 11 and 12 December 2014.

In April 2016, in order to celebrate its 30th anniversary, the band released the album Ako stanemo, gubimo sve (If We Stop, We'll Lose Everything). The album featured twelve old songs recorded in new, mostly acoustic arrangements. On 22 April 2016 the band performed, alongside Riblja Čorba, Piloti, Galija and Električni Orgazam on the opening of renovated Tašmajdan Stadium. The band celebrated their 30th anniversary on the festival 5 do 100 (5 to 100), which was held on 4 July 2016 on Niš Fortress. The festival featured Van Gogh, the band Novembar, celebrating their 30th anniversary, and the band Galija celebrating their 40th anniversary (the combined "age" of the bands was 95, thus the title of the festival). Van Gogh's performance featured guest appearance by Kerber vocalist Goran Šepa. At the beginning of 2019 the band released their 10th studio album called “More bez Obala”(A sea without shores).

The frontman of the group Zvonimir Đukić was attacked while performing in Sarajevo in July 2019. In 2019 Branislav Gluvakov left the group and in 2020 Dejan Ilić parted ways with the band for the second time as well thus leading to the return of Dragan Ivanović for his third stint with Van Gogh. This move made Van Gogh a historically recognizable three man band once more.

== Legacy ==
The Rock Express Top 100 Yugoslav Rock Songs of All Times list, published in 2000, featured three songs by Van Gogh: "Neko te ima" (polled No.6), the version of "Klatno" from No Comment (polled No.40) and "Mama" (polled No.52). In 2011, the song "Neko te ima" was voted, by the listeners of Radio 202, one of 60 greatest songs released by PGP-RTB/PGP-RTS during the sixty years of the label's existence.

== Band members ==
Current members

- Zvonimir Đukić "Đule" - vocals, guitar
- Srboljub Radivojević "Srba"- drums
- Dragan Ivanović - bass guitar

Past members

- Jovan Samardzic - bass guitar
- Goran Milisavljević - vocals
- Predrag Popović - bass guitar
- Aleksandar Barać - bass guitar
- Miško Veličković - bass guitar
- Dušan Bogović "Gary" - bass guitar
- Đorđe Petrović - keyboards
- Vlada Barjaktarević - keyboards
- Dejan Ilić “Cvika” - bass guitar
- Aleksandar Stojkovski "Tallica Boy" - guitar
- Branislav Gluvakov "Bane" - guitar

== Discography ==
=== Studio albums ===
- Van Gogh (1986)
- Svet je moj (1991) (The world is mine)
- Strast (1993) (Passion)
- Hodi (1996) (Come)
- Opasan ples (1999) (Dangerous Dance)
- DrUnder (2002)
- Kolo (2006) (Circle Dance)
- Lavirint (2009) (Labyrinth)
- Neumeren u svemu (2013) (Insecure with everything)
- More bez obala (2019) (Sea without a coast)

=== Live albums ===
- No Comment (1997)
- Happy New Ear (2001)
- Srećno Novo UžiVo (2007)

=== Compilations ===
- Tragovi prošlosti (1995) (Traces of the past)
- Rani radovi, 1991-2001 (2001) (Earlier works)
- Total (2011)
- Ako stanemo, gubimo sve (2016) (If we stop, we lose everything)

=== Singles ===
- "Tragovi prošlosti" / "Samo san" (1986) (Traces of the past / Just a dream)
- "Tvoj smeh" / "Kako zove se" (1987) (Your smile / What is it called)
- "Gubiš me" / "Tvojim imenom" (1990) (Your losing me / With your name)
- "Zemlja čuda" / "Besnilo" (1994) (World of wonders / Helpless)
- "Qu'hier que demain" / "Polje snova (Unplugged)" (1998) (More than yesterday, less than tomorrow / Field of Dreams)
- "Brod od papira" / "Intervju sa Đuletom" (1999) (Boat of paper / Interview with Djule)
- "Spisak razloga" (2006) (List of reasons)
- "Kolo - Ludo, luda" (2006) (Circle Dance - Crazy)
- "Nek' te telo nosi" (2009) (Let your body carry you)
- "Nešto vuče me dole" (2013) (Something is pulling me down)
- "Anđele moj brate" / "Skačem skači" (2014) (Angel, my brother / I'm jumping, jump)
- "Za suze nema vremena" (2018) (There is no time for tears)
- "Više te ne volim ko pre" (2019) (I don't love you like earlier)
- "Možda baš sad" (2019) (Maybe exactly now)

=== Video albums ===
- Beogradska Arena / Live (2007)

== Awards and nominations ==
Year	Award	Category	Result
2007	MTV Europe Music Awards	Best Adriatic Act	Won
2009	Serbian Oscar Of Popularity	Best Band	Won
2009	Serbian Oscar Of Popularity	Best Concert	Won
2013	MTV platinum award	Video play	Won
2014	MTV Europe Music Awards	Best Adriatic Act	Won
2014	MTV Europe Music Awards	Best European Act	Nominated
2019	The Naxi star	Album of the year	Won
2020	2020 Music Awards Ceremony	Rock song of the year	Won

Awards
New title	Serbian Oscar Of Popularity; The Band of the Year; 2009	Succeeded by Električni Orgazam
New title	Serbian Oscar Of Popularity; The Concert of the Year; 2009	Succeeded by Stefan Milenković & Vlatko Stefanovski
