= Slomljena Stakla =

- Slomljena Stakla in 1984

Background information
- Origin: Belgrade, SR Serbia, SFR Yugoslavia
- Genres: New wave; synth-pop; pop rock; power pop
- Years active: 1983–1991
- Labels: ZKP RTLJ, Jugoton, PGP-RTB, Jugodisk
- Past members: Zoran Vasilić; Dragan Zarić; Aleksandar Živanović; Mladen Lukač; Milan Stanković; Dragan Petrović; Vladan Vasiljević; Ivan Ranković; Branko Jelić; Miloš Pavlović; Milorad Džmerković

Slomljena Stakla (Serbian Cyrillic: Сломљена Стакла; trans. Broken Glass) was a Yugoslav pop rock band formed in Belgrade in 1982. They were a prominent act of the 1980s Yugoslav rock scene.

== History ==
=== 1982-1991 ===
The band's beginnings can be tracked to 1980, when singer and songwriter Zoran Vasilić formed the band Sebastijan. Soon after, he became the guitarist for the band Lutka (Doll), featuring Jelena Tinska on vocals. In mid-1983, with the formation of the new lineup of the band, they changed the name to Slomljena Stakla, after a verse from Lutke song "Šminka" ("Makeup"). The first lineup of Slomljena Stakla featured, beside Vasilić, guitarist Dragan Zarić "Zare" (a former member of the band Kvazar), bass guitarist Aleksandar Živanović (formerly of Kota 19, Afera, Divlji Anđeli, Desert, and Šamar) drummer Mladen Lukač (drums) and keyboardist Milan Stanković. Prior to the recording of their debut album, Dragan Petrović left the band and was replaced by Milan Stanković.

Their debut album, Psiho klub (Psycho Club), was produced by Srđan Marjanović and released in 1983 through ZKP RTLJ record label. The album featured Vuk Vujačić (of the band Du Du A) on saxophone and Zoran Radetić on keyboards as guest musicians, Radetić contributing significantly to the album sound with his ideas. Backing vocals were sung by Snežana Stamenković and Srđan Marjanović. The album brought the hit "Još jedna votka" ("Another Vodka"). After the album release, the band was joined by keyboardist Dragan Petrović (formerly of the bands Crni Baron and Pasta ZZ).

In the autumn of 1984, after a large number of concerts, the band released the album Ljubav je kad... (Love Is When...), produced by Saša Habić, through Jugoton. The songs, heavily influenced by the bands of the New Romantic movement, were written by Zarić and Vasilić. The album brought the hits "Una", "Monsunski vetrovi" ("Monsoons"), "Leto je, devojko" ("It Is Summer, Girl"), the title track, and the instrumental track "Senke u noći" ("Shadows in the Night"). Soon after the album was released, the band was joined by the new bass guitarist, Vladan Vasiljević, and the new drummer, Ivan Ranković. During the following period, the guitar was played by Branko Jelić and Miloš Pavlović. Despite the success of the second album, in mid-1985 the band went on a hiatus.

The album Samo ljubav može to (Only Love Can Do That), released in 1988 through PGP-RTB, marked a shift towards more guitar-oriented power pop sound, with some songs featuring folk music elements. The album was recorded by Vasilić, Petrović and the new member, Milorad Džmerković (keyboards). It featured studio musicians Safet Petrovac "Saja" on guitar and Dejan Škopelja on bass guitar and former S Vremena Na Vreme members Ljuba Ninković and Asim Sarvan on backing vocals.

In 1991, Vasilić and Petrović, with a group of younger musicians, recorded the album Samo za tebe (Only for You), released through Jugodisk. The album featured a new version "Još jedna votka", entitled "Još jedna votka, još jedno pivo" ("Another Vodka, Another Beer"), and hits "Sledi me" ("Follow Me") and "Ivana", the latter written by Boris Novković. The album was produced by Vasilić and Duda Bezuha, who also played the guitar. It also featured Snežana Ristić on vocals and Milan Komnenić on keyboards. After the album release, Slomljena Stakla ended their activity.

=== Post breakup ===
The band's former keyboatdist Dragan Petrović moved to Canada in 1992. He performed in jazz clubs and released the instrumental music album Jazz Café – Jazz After Dark, recorded on his performance in the Galaxy club in Toronto. In 2004, he released the smooth jazz album Café Nervosa, and in 2011, he released the album The Vibe – New York Jazz in similar musical style. Latest recording is EP "Zero Gravity Love" January 2025

The band's former keyboardist Milorad Džmerković died on 26 September 2022.

== Discography ==
=== Studio albums ===
- Psiho klub (1983)
- Ljubav je kad... (1984)
- Samo ljubav može to (1988)
- Samo za tebe (1991)

=== Singles ===
- "Monsunski vetrovi" / "Leto je devojko" (1984)

== See also ==
- New wave music in Yugoslavia
