= Neumeren u svemu =

Studio album by Van Gogh
- Released: 2013
- Genre: Rock; Power pop World music
- Label: Gold / Croatia Records

Van Gogh chronology
Lavirint (2009)	Neumeren u svemu (2013)	Ako stanemo, gubimo sve (2016)

Neumeren u svemu is the ninth studio album by Serbian rock band Van Gogh, released in 2013.

== Background ==
The band's frontman Zvonimir Đukić and drummer Srboljub Radivojević, the only two mainstay members of the band since its formation, were credited on the album as the only two members of Van Gogh. It is the band's second album to feature Đukić and Radivojević as the only two official members (the other one being their fifth studio album Opasan ples). The album was released on compact disc and on vinyl record.

== Track listing ==
1. „Osećam da ludim“ (Z. Đukić, S. Radivojević) – 4:06
2. „Uvek ima neka razlika“ (Z. Đukić) – 3:06
3. „Prva i poslednja kap“ (Z. Đukić, S. Radivojević) – 3:59
4. „Neumeren u svemu“ (Z. Đukić, S. Radivojević) – 3:19
5. „Nešto vuče me dole“ (Z. Đukić) – 3:54
6. „Viline vode“ (Z. Đukić) – 4:22
7. „Moj nemir i ja“ (Z. Đukić) – 3:25
8. „Skačem – skači“ (Z. Đukić) – 3:31
9. „Previše za jednog, premalo za dvoje“ (Z. Đukić, S. Radivojević, O. Mrđenović) – 3:57
10. „Anđele, moj brate“ (Z. Đukić, A. Gligorijević) – 4:46

== Personnel ==
- Zvonimir Đukić - vocals, guitar, bass guitar, keyboards, mandolin, programming, arranged by
- Srboljub Radivojević - drums, percussion, backing vocals, arranged by

=== Additional personnel ===
- Vojislav Aralica - programming, guitar, keyboards, bass guitar, backing vocals, produced by, arranged by
- Sonja Kalajić - musical saw, violin, castanets (track 6)
- Nikola Usanović - bass guitar (tracks: 3, 4)
- Bojana Rašić - backing vocals (track 10)
- Nevena Filipović - backing vocals (track 10)
- Nikola "Kolja" Pejaković - backing vocals (track 10)
- Choir (track 10)
  - Anđela Dinić
  - Aleksa Dinić
  - Teodora Butulija
  - Teodora Timotić
  - Hristina Timotijević
  - Nina Ranđeović
  - Anđela Platiša
