= Čuvar tajni =

Studio album by Kraljevski Apartman
- Released: 2008
- Genres: Hard rock Heavy metal
- Length: 44:06
- Label: PGP-RTS

Kraljevski Apartman chronology
Best of Live (1996–2005) (2005)	Čuvar tajni (2008)	Igre bez pravila (2012)

Professional ratings
Review scores
Source	Rating
Popboks	5/10 stars
RockSerbia.net	8/10 stars
Serbian-metal.org	(favorable)

Čuvar tajni (trans. The Keeper of Secrets) is the fifth studio album by Serbian heavy metal band Kraljevski Apartman. Čuvar tajni is the band's only album recorded with vocalist Ivan Đerković.

The album features a new version of the song "Jesen", originally released on Kraljevski Apartman's second album Izgubljen u vremenu.

== Track listing ==
All songs written by Zoran Zdravković.

No.	Title	Length
1.	"2008"	5:25
2.	"Čarobni štap" ("Wand")	5:11
3.	"Prst sudbine" ("Finger of Destiny")	5:04
4.	"Još samo jednom" ("Only One More Time")	3:39
5.	"Burne godine" ("Tumultuous Years")	0:13
6.	"Pusto ostrvo" ("Desert Island")	4:59
7.	"Ne treba mi raj" ("I Don't Need Heaven")	4:08
8.	"Dođi do mene" ("Come to Me")	4:16
9.	"Jesen" ("Autumn")	6:03
10.	"Čuvar tajni" ("The Keeper of Secrets")	5:08

== Personnel ==
- Ivan Đerković - vocals
- Zoran Zdravković - guitar
- Miloš Nikolić - guitar
- Marko Nikolić - bass guitar
- Zoran Radovanović - drums
