= Deep Purple Tribute =

Live album by Cactus Jack
- Released: May 2003
- Recorded: Couple club, Pančevo; 22 November 2002
- Genre: Hard rock
- Label: One Records
- Producer: Cactus Jack

Cactus Jack chronology
Grad (2003)	Deep Purple Tribute (2003)	Natur all (2004)

Deep Purple Tribute is the second live album by Serbian hard rock band Cactus Jack, recorded as a tribute album to British hard rock band Deep Purple and released in 2003. The album was released on two discs featuring 12 covers of Deep Purple songs.

The album was recorded on Cactus Jack concert held on 22 November 2002 in Coupe club in their hometown Pančevo. Deep Purple Tribute was the band's first album to feature keyboardist Zoran Samuilov. The opening track, "Highway Star", features rock musician and radio host Vladimir Janković "Džet" announcing the band. Janković also appears on vocals on the track "Black Night". Dragoljub "Paja" Bogdanović—who appeared as a guest on the band's debut album, Discover, and would become the band's frontman in 2015—appears on vocals on the track "Strange Kind of Woman". Bogdanović also designed the album cover.

== Track listing ==
=== Disc 1 ===
No.	Title	Writer(s)	Length
1.	"Highway Star"	Ritchie Blackmore; Ian Gillan; Roger Glover; Jon Lord; Ian Paice	9:04
2.	"Speed King"	Ritchie Blackmore; Ian Gillan; Roger Glover; Jon Lord; Ian Paice	6:25
3.	"Perfect Strangers"	Ritchie Blackmore; Ian Gillan; Roger Glover	6:20
4.	"Child in Time"	Ritchie Blackmore; Ian Gillan; Roger Glover; Jon Lord; Ian Paice	10:53
5.	"Black Night"	Ritchie Blackmore; Ian Gillan; Roger Glover; Jon Lord; Ian Paice	5:53
6.	"Stormbringer"	Ritchie Blackmore; David Coverdale	4:29
7.	"Mistreated"	Ritchie Blackmore; David Coverdale	10:14
8.	"Knocking at Your Back Door"	Ritchie Blackmore; Ian Gillan; Roger Glover	7:53

=== Disc 2 ===
No.	Title	Writer(s)	Length
9.	"Strange Kind of Woman"	Ritchie Blackmore; Ian Gillan; Roger Glover; Jon Lord; Ian Paice	9:04
10.	"Space Truckin'"	Ritchie Blackmore; Ian Gillan; Roger Glover; Jon Lord; Ian Paice	10:17
11.	"Burn"	Ritchie Blackmore; David Coverdale; Jon Lord; Ian Paice	8:06
12.	"Smoke on the Water"	Ritchie Blackmore; Ian Gillan; Roger Glover; Jon Lord; Ian Paice	9:51

== Personnel ==
- Vladimir Jezdimirović - vocals
- Stevan Birak - guitar
- Miodrag Krudulj - bass guitar
- Dušan Gnjidić - drums
- Zoran Samuilov - keyboard

=== Additional personnel ===
- Vladimir Janković "Džet" - vocals (on track 5), announcement (on track 1)
- Dragoljub "Paja" Bogdanović - vocals (on track 9), cover design
- Moma Cvetković - sound engineer, recorded by
- Zoltan Totka - photography
