= Divlji Anđeli =

Yugoslav pop rock band

- Divlji Anđeli in 1982

Background information
- Origin: Belgrade, SR Serbia, SFR Yugoslavia
- Genre: Pop rock
- Years active: 1982–1984
- Label: PGP-RTB
- Past members: Dragan Đorđević; Nebojša Savić; Dejan Lalević; Miroslav Lekić; Radomir Marić; Branko Jirček

Divlji Anđeli (Serbian Cyrillic: Дивљи Анђели; trans. Wild Angels) was a Yugoslav pop rock band formed in Belgrade in 1982. Although short-lived, the band enjoyed large mainstream popularity during its existence, mostly owing to the 1982 hit song "Voli te tvoja zver".

== History ==
The band was formed in 1982 by Dragan Đorđević "Joe" (formerly of the band Tarkus, guitar), Nebojša Savić "Boca" (vocals), Dejan Lalević (bass guitar) and Miroslav Lekić "Šiki" (drums), all strongly influenced by New Romanticism movement. For several weeks, young guitarist Antonije Pušić (who would later gain prominence under the stage name Rambo Amadeus) rehearsed with them, but eventually did not join the band.

Divlji Anđeli released their debut self-titled album in 1982, without previously having any live performances. All the songs were composed by Nebojša Savić, while the album lyrics were written by Savić and lyricist Marina Tucaković. The album was produced by Saša Habić, who also played keyboards on the album recording. The album featured Marina Švabić of jazz rock band KIM on backing vocals and Borivoje Pavićević on percussion. The album brought the band's only hit, "Voli te tvoja zver" ("Your Beast Loves You").

In 1984, the band, in the new lineup, consisting of Savić on guitar and vocals, Lekić on drums, Radomir Marić on bass guitar and Branko Jirček on keyboards, released the 12" single Totalni kontakt (Total Contact). The single featured two versions of the title track and the song "Otrovna ljubav" ("Poison Love"). It featured guest appearances by Zana Nimani (vocalst), Aleksandar Radulović "Futa" (guitar) and Zoran Stojić (guitar). After the release of Totalni kontakt, the band ended their activity.

=== Post breakup ===
After Divlji Anđeli disbanded, Savić moved to Germany. In early 1990s, Radomir Marić joined pop band Divlji Kesten, with which he recorded five studio albums. In late 2000s, he played bass guitar in the heavy metal band Kraljevski Apartman, participating in the recording of the album Igre bez pravila, but leaving the band before the album release. Dragan Đorđević "Joe" died on 2 December 1995.

== Legacy ==
The song "Voli te tvoja zver" was covered by Serbian girl group Models under the title "Anđeo" ("Angel") on their 2007 album New Generation, and by Serbian rock band Čika Joca i Zmajevi on their 2012 album Bez obzira na sve (No Matter What).

In 2011, the song "Voli te tvoja zver" was voted, by the listeners of Radio 202, one of 60 greatest songs released by PGP-RTB/PGP-RTS during the sixty years of the label's existence.

== Discography ==
=== Studio albums ===
- Divlji Anđeli (1982)

=== Singles ===
- Totalni kontakt (12" single, 1984)
