= Kraljevski Apartman =

Serbian heavy metal band from Belgrade

- Origin: Belgrade, Serbia
- Genres: Hard rock, heavy metal
- Years active: 1995 – present
- Labels: Rock Express Records, PGP-RTS, Power Music
- Members: Zoran Zdravković; Rade Marić, Zoran Rončević, Dejan Antić
- Past members: Zoran Lalović; Ivan Đerković; Marko Nikolić; Dejan Đorđević; Zoran Rončević; Nebojša Čanković; Srđan Duždević; Igor Čačija; Miroslav Šen; Slobodan Ignjatović; Rade Marić; Vladimir Rajčić; Nebojša Maksimović; Zoran Radovanović
- Website: www.kraljevski-apartman.com

Kraljevski Apartman (Serbian Cyrillic: Краљевски Апартман; trans. Royal Suite) is a Serbian heavy metal band from Belgrade. The band rose to prominence during the late 1990s and early 2000s, becoming one of the most popular bands on the Serbian heavy metal scene.

== History ==
=== Apartman 69 ===
The band's history began in 1979, when guitarist Zoran Zdravković (a former member of the bands Exodus, Zvučni Zid, Bicikl, and Tvrdo Srce i Velike Uši) formed the hard rock band Apartman 69 (Apartment 69). The band recorded only one album Seti se moje pesme (Remember My Song), in 1983. The line up which recorded the album consisted of Dragan Blažić (vocals), Zoran Zdravković (guitar), Dejan Mihajlović (keyboard, backing vocals), Milan Mastelica (bass guitar, backing vocals) and Jovan Simonović (drums). One of the band's lineups also included Zvonimir Đukić, today's frontman of the popular band Van Gogh on rhythm guitar and Vladan Dokić, drummer of the hard rock band Rok Mašina. After the release of the album, due to the great popularity of new wave bands, Apartman 69 ceased to exist.

=== 1990s ===
After 13 years, Zdravković, with the support of Riblja Čorba's frontman Bora Đorđević, decided to form a new band and with vocalist Zoran "Lotke" Lalović formed Kraljevski Apartman in 1995. The first lineup of the band soon after had split and the new lineup consisted of Lalović (vocals), Zdravković (guitar), Zoran Rončević (drums), Nebojša Čanković (guitar) and Vladimir Rajčić (bass guitar). Riblja Čorba drummer Vicko Milatović was approached to join the band as the bass guitarist, but eventually refused. This lineup recorded the band's first album Long Live Rock 'n' Roll for Rock Express Records. The title track of the album is a cover version of a Rainbow hit with the same title. The album included eight songs and the most notable were "Mračan grad" ("Dark City"), "Ne verujem u lažne anđele" ("I Don't Believe in False Angels"), "Misterija" ("Mystery") and "Oprosti mi" ("Forgive Me"). Promotional video was recorded for the song "Misterija". Zdravković provided most of the lyrics and music. The band performed as a support act on Riblja Čorba tour, and presented the album to the audience in Serbia.

In 1999, Rončević left the band and the lineup included a new drummer Srđan Duždević and rhythm guitarist Miroslav Šen. This lineup recorded the second album titled Izgubljen u vremenu (Lost in Time). The album featured heavier sound and its main hits were "Izgubljen u vremenu", "Slomljeno srce" ("Broken Heart"), "Nikad se ne predajem" ("I Never Give Up"), "Ne traži đavola" ("Don't Tease the Devil") and "Posle oluje (Javi se...)" ("After the Storm (Call...)". The album also included the cover of Uriah Heep's song "Lady in Black", Kraljevski Apartman version titled "Slike" ("Images"). The CD edition of the album included four songs from Long Live Rock 'n' Roll as bonus tracks. All the lyrics were written by Zdravković except "Znak Zveri" ("Mark of the Beast") by Vicko Milatović. A promotional video was recorded for the song "Posle oluje (Javi se...)".

=== 2000s ===
In 2002, after appearing on Hard 'n' Heavy Festival as a headliner, numerous appearances on festivals and on their own, the band entered the studio Paradoks to record demos for the following album. For the recording of their third album, the band changed the lineup because Šen, Duždević and Čačija left the band. The new lineup included drummer Zoran Rončević, who recorded the first album with the band, bass guitarist Marko Nikolić (who had previously played with Vatreni Poljubac) and Dejan Đorđević on keyboards. For Rocker, released in 2002 by Rock Express Records, the band added a keyboard player and switched to only one guitar making the band's sound more melodic. The album featured hits "Ranjena zver" ("Wounded Beast") and "Rocker" (a promotional video was recorded for the former), ballads "Za ljubav ne treba da moliš" ("You Shouldn't Beg for Love") and "Dama iz kraljevskog apartmana" ("Lady from the Royal Apartment"), and song "U lavirintu sedam greha" ("In the Labyrinth of Seven Sins") from the Lavirint movie soundtrack (bonus on CD edition). The album also featured the song "Niemandsland" (German for "No Man's Land") with lyrics in German language and sung by Zdravković. All the lyrics were provided by Zdravković. After the success of Rocker, the band became well known in Czech Republic, Slovakia, Poland and the albums was distributed in about twenty countries.

For the first time since in the band's history, the same lineup recorded two albums. Ruka pravde (Hand of Justice) was released in 2004, this time for PGP-RTS. The album was considered by both fans and critics to be one of the band's finest works. Songs "Ruka pravde", "Dao sam sve od sebe" ("I Did My Best"), "Izaberi jedan put" ("Chose a Path") and ballads "Sve u svoje vreme" ("There Is Time for Everything") and "Sve su noći iste" ("All the Nights Are the Same") became main hits. The band presented the album while touring with Belgrade's Radio 202 live show Hit 202. During the same year, the band, alongside Cactus Jack, performed as an opening act on Deep Purple's concert in Belgrade.

In 2005, the band entered its first decade of existence, and on the 10th birthday, a recording of a live DVD and album were scheduled. The DVD was recorded live in Belgrade's Studentski Kulturni Centar and released under the title 10 Godina sa vama - Live SKC (10 Years with You - Live SKC). The DVD also includes interviews with the band members and others connected to the band and videos for "Ruka pravde", "Ranjena zver" and "Misterija". The soundtrack of the DVD featuring selected tracks from the concert was released as Best Of Live (1996 - 2005). After the release of the album, the band played various dates including opening, together with Alogia, for Whitesnake on Belgrade's Tašmajdan. This was the last concert with the keyboard player Dejan Đorđević. Following Đorđević's departure, Zoran Rončević also left the band. He was replaced by Zoran Radovanović who previously played with Generacija 5. After performing as a four-part band, Miloš Nikolić, Marko Nikolić's brother, stepped in on rhythm guitar. This lineup started writing new material and recorded demos for several tracks. One of them, "Čuvar tajni" ("The Keeper of Secrets"), appeared as a radio promo single.

On August 17, 2007 the band played at Belgrade Beer Fest which was officially the last show with vocalist Zoran Lalović before September 2008. His replacement was a former Which 1 frontman Ivan "Đera" Đerković. The first and the only album with Đerković on vocals, Čuvar tajni (The Keeper of Secrets) was released through PGP RTS in 2008. The band recorded nine new songs and made a new version of the track "Jesen", which originally appeared on the band's second album. A promotional video was recorded for the track "Čarobni štap". Lalović formed his own band and after months of performing as The No Name Band, the band got the name Lotke & Lavirint (Lotke & The Labyrinth) performing songs by Kraljevski Apartman. For a short time period a drummer of Lotke & Lavirint was Zoran Rončević, former Kraljevski Apartman drummer. After several promotional concerts for the new album, in September 2008, Marko Nikolić left the band. As Đerković was not well accepted by fans, Lalović was approached to return as the lead vocal, and during September he returned to the band, replacing Đerković.

In 2009, with the beginning of the work on their new studio album, the band released the single "Pandora", along with the music video.

=== 2010s ===
In April 2012, the band recorded two new songs, "Magija" ("Magic") dedicated to the late Ronnie James Dio, and "Dodaj gas" ("Pedal to the Metal"), available for free download through Timemachinemusic.org and announcing the band's sixth studio album. The album, entitled Igre bez pravila (Games without rules), produced by Lalović and released through Power Music in November 2012, featured two new members: Vladimir Rajčić (bass guitar), who previously played on Long Live Rock 'n' Roll, and Nebojša Maksimović (keyboards). On June 14, 2013, the band performed as an opening act for Whitesnake at the Belgrade Fortress.

On December 31, the band had their last appearance with Lalović on vocals, on Republic Square in Belgrade on a New Year's Eve concert, where the band performed alongside Neverne Bebe, Kiki Lesendrić & Piloti, Alisa and Sanja Ilić & Balkanika. Lalović died on May 3, 2015, after short illness. He was 65 years old.

In December 2015, the band announced the continuation of their activity with the single "Lud sam za tobom" ("Crazy About You"), recorded with new vocalist, Jovan Baranin. The rest of the new lineup features Zoran Zdravković (guitar), Miroslav Đorđević (guitar), Bojan Antonijević (bass guitar) and Nenad Vuković (drums). On May 16, 2017, the band released the single "Krv heroja" ("Blood of the Heroes").

== Discography ==
=== Studio albums ===
- Long Live Rock 'n' Roll (1997)
- Izgubljen u vremenu (2000)
- Rocker (2002)
- Ruka pravde (2004)
- Čuvar tajni (2008)
- Igre bez pravila (2012)

=== Live albums ===
- Best of Live (1996–2005) (2005)

=== Video albums ===
- 10 godina sa vama - Live SKC (2005)
