= Seti se moje pesme =

Studio album by Apartman 69
- Released: 1983
- Recorded: Studio "O", July 1983
- Genre: Hard rock
- Length: 29:49
- Label: Diskos
- Producer: Dragan Popović

Apartman 69 chronology
Seti se moje pesme (1983)	Long Live Rock 'n' Roll (1997)

Seti se moje pesme (trans. "Remember My Song") is the first and only album by former Yugoslav hard rock band Apartman 69 released in 1983. Following the release of the album, the band disbanded due to lack of popularity. In 1996, guitarist Zoran Zdravković formed the band Kraljevski Apartman, but none of the tracks from Apartman 69 were performed. The album was never released on CD.

== Track listing ==
=== Side one ===
1. "Vesnine jesenje kiše" (Z. Zdravković, D. Janković, A69) - 2:55
2. "Seti se moje pesme" (D. Blažić, A69) - 5:12
3. "Budim se" (D. Dimitrijević, D. Blažić, A69) - 3:44
4. "Sećanje No 1" (Z. Zdravković, D. Janković, A69) - 3:08

=== Side two ===
1. "Lažeš me, Ana" (Z. Zdravković, D. Blažić, D. Janković, A69) - 4:08
2. "Ama, ti si ona ista" (Z. Zdravković, D. Janković, A69) - 3:12
3. "Sećanje No 2" (D. Blažić, D. Janković, A69) - 4:22
4. "Apartman 69" (M. Jovanović, A69) - 3:08

== Personnel ==
- Dragan Blažić - vocals
- Zoran Zdravković - guitar
- Milan Mastelica - bass guitar, backing vocals
- Jovan Simonović - drums
- Dejan Mihajlović - keyboards, backing vocals
