= Igra bojama =

Studio album by Oktobar 1864
- Released: 1988
- Genre: Funk rock; jazz pop; blue-eyed soul
- Label: PGP-RTB
- Producer: Mitar Subotić, Theodore Yanni

Oktobar 1864 chronology
Oktobar 1864 (1987)	Igra bojama (1988)	Crni ples (1990)

Igra bojama (trans. Play with Colours) is the second studio album by Yugoslav rock band Oktobar 1864, released in 1988.

== Background and recording ==
Following commercial and critical success of their 1987 self-titled debut, the band recorded their second album in a new lineup, with Dejan Abadić replacing Dean Krmpotić on keyboards, and Vuk Dinić replacing Nebojša Mrvaljević on trombone. The album was produced by Mitar "Suba" Subotić, and featured guest appearances by saxophonists Deže Molnar and Josip Kovač, and by Milan Mladenović (of Ekatarina Velika) and Nera (formerly of Aska) on backing vocals.

The album cover was designed by comic book artist Zoran Janjetov.

== Track listing ==
A side
No.	Title	Lyrics	Music	Length
1.	"Sam" ("Alone")	Strahinja Knežević	Oktobar 1864	3:40
2.	"Pratiš trag" ("You're Following the Trace")	Oktobar 1864	Oktobar 1864	4:15
3.	"Senke 2" ("Shadows 2")	Oktobar 1864	Oktobar 1864	5:00
4.	"Čekam" ("I'm Waiting")	Strahinja Knežević	Oktobar 1864	4:08

B side
No.	Title	Lyrics	Music	Length
1.	"Želim te" ("I Want You")	Oktobar 1864	Dejan Abadić	4:32
2.	"Prolazi dan" ("Day Is Passing")	Strahinja Knežević	Oktobar 1864	4:15
3.	"Tvoj dah" ("Your Breath")	Marija Miljević	Oktobar 1864	3:20
4.	"Ovde ili bilo gde" ("Here or Anywhere")	Strahinja Knežević	Oktobar 1864	3:25

== Personnel ==
- Tanja Jovićević - vocals
- Goran Tomanović - guitar
- Željko Mitrović - bass guitar
- Ivan Zečević - drums
- Dejan Abadić - keyboards
- Marko Lalić - saxophone
- Branko Baćović - trumpet
- Vuk Dinić - trombone

=== Additional personnel ===
- Deže Molnar - saxophone
- Josip Kovač - saxophone
- Milan Mladenović - backing vocals
- Nera - backing vocals
- Sanja Čačinović - backing vocals
- Mitar Subotić - producer
- Theodore Yanni - recorded by, producer
- Zoran Janjetov - cover design
- Zorica Bajin-Đukanović - photography

== Reception ==
The album brought sophisticated white soul hits "Sam" ("Alone"), "Pratiš trag" ("You're Following the Trace") and "Želim te" ("I Want You"). At the end of 1988, readers of Yugoslav music magazine Pop Rock polled the band the Biggest Hope of the Year, Jovićević was polled the Female Vocalist of the Year, and Igra bojama album cover, designed by artist Zoran Janjetov, was polled the Album Cover of the Year.
