= Četiri godišnja doba =

EP by Bajaga i Instruktori
- Released: 18 September 1991
- Recorded: Bajaga i Instruktori Studio; August 1991
- Genre: Pop rock
- Label: Diskoton
- Producer: Saša Habić; Miroslav Cvetković; Momčilo Bajagić; Saša Lokner

Bajaga i Instruktori chronology
Neka svemir čuje nemir (1989)	Četiri godišnja doba (1991)	Muzika na struju (1993)

Četiri godišnja doba (English: The Four Seasons) is an EP from Serbian and former Yugoslav rock band Bajaga i Instruktori, released in 1991. The album features four songs, each one representing a different season.

The EP features the opera singer Jadranka Jovanović as guest.

== Track listing ==
All the songs were written by Momčilo Bajagić, except where noted.

1. "Dobro jutro (Leto)" – 3:32
2. "Uspavanka (Jesen)" – 3:31
3. "U koži krokodila (Zima)" (Žika Milenković, M. Bajagić) – 3:00
4. "Buđenje ranog proleća" – 4:36

== Personnel ==
- Momčilo Bajagić - vocals, guitar, arranged by, producer
- Žika Milenković - vocals, arranged by
- Miroslav Cvetković - bass guitar, arranged by, recorded by, producer
- Saša Lokner - keyboards, arranged by, producer
- Nenad Stamatović - guitar
- Vladimir Golubović - drums

=== Additional personnel ===
- Jadranka Jovanović - vocals
- Saša Habić - guitar, producer
- Branko Mačić - guitar
