= Mainscream =

Studio album by Cactus Jack
- Released: October 2005
- Recorded: Studio 5 PGP RTS, Belgrade; July–September 2005
- Genre: Hard rock
- Label: PGP-RTS
- Producer: Saša Habić

Cactus Jack chronology
Natur all (2004)	Mainscream (2005)

Professional ratings
Review scores
Source	Rating
Barikada	5/10 stars
Metal Hammer (Serbian edition)	(favorable)

Mainscream is the second studio album by Serbian hard rock band Cactus Jack, released in 2005.

With Mainscream Cactus Jack made a slight shift from their traditional hard rock style towards a more melodic hard rock sound. The lyrics for the song "Glumica" ("Actress") were written by singer Bebi Dol. The album cover was designed by the band's old associate Dragoljub "Paja" Bogdanović, who would in 2015 become the band's frontman.

== Track listing ==
All songs written by Stevan Birak and Vladimir Jezidimirović except where noted.

No.	Title	Lyrics	Music	Length
1.	"Koliko puta na dan" ("How Many Times a Day")			4:42
2.	"Druga boja meni treba" ("I Need Another Color")			3:02
3.	"Nokaut-erotika" ("Knockout Erotica")			3:54
4.	"Gubim i dobijam" ("I'm Winning and Losing")			3:21
5.	"Bye Bye Baby"			3:21
6.	"Glumica" ("Actress")	Bebi Dol	Saša Milošević; Vladimir Graić	3:24
7.	"Akutna bigamija" ("Acute Bigamy")			3:16
8.	"Neću da budem deo tebe" ("I Won't Be a Part of You")			3:40
9.	"Pivo za sve" ("Beer for All")			4:07
10.	"Sunčan dan" ("Sunny Day")			3:51

== Personnel ==
- Vladimir Jezdimirović - vocals
- Stevan Birak - guitar
- Miodrag Krudulj - bass guitar
- Dušan Gnjidić - drums
- Zoran Samuilov - keyboard

=== Additional personnel ===
- Saša Habić - producer, arrangements, mixing, mastering
- Zoran Vukčević - recorded by, mixing
- Radovan Maričić - recorded by
- Dragoljub "Paja" Bogdanović - cover design
- Zoltan Totka - photography
