= Neka svemir čuje nemir =

Live album by Bajaga i Instruktori
- Released: 1989
- Recorded: Studio V PGP-RTB, Belgrade, October 1989; April 12, 1984
- Genre: Pop rock
- Label: PGP-RTB
- Producer: Saša Habić; Ivan Vlatković

Bajaga i Instruktori chronology
'Prodavnica tajni' (1988)	Neka svemir čuje nemir (1989)	'Četiri godišnja doba' (1991)

Professional ratings
Review scores
Source	Rating
Ritam	3/5 stars

Neka svemir čuje nemir (trans. May the Universe Hear the Unrest) is a double and the first live album by Serbian and former Yugoslav rock band Bajaga i Instruktori, released in 1989.

The first five tracks on the album are studio tracks. "Na vrhovima prstiju", "Idem (Kao da ne idem, a idem)" and "Neka svemir čuje nemir" made their debut on the album, and "Tekila - Gerila" and "Tamara" are acoustic versions of the songs from the album Pozitivna geografija.

One part of the live tracks was recorded on March 6, 1989, on the band's concert in Dom Sportova in Zagreb. the other part was recorded on September 15, 1989, on the band's performance at EBU Rock Festival in Novi Sad. The last track of the album is the recording of the journalist Dražen Vrdoljak announcing the band on their concert in Kulušić club in Zagreb, held on December 8, 1984.

The album features a live version of the song "Kad hodaš", originally recorded by Momčilo Bajagić's former band Riblja Čorba.

== Track listing ==
All tracks written by Momčilo Bajagić except where noted.

== Track listing ==
All songs written by Momčilo Bajagić.

No.	Title	Music	Length
1.	"Na vrhovima prstiju" (On The Fingertips)	M. Bajagić
2.	"Tekila - Gerila" ("Tequila - Guerila")	M. Bajagić
3.	"Idem (Kao da ne idem, a idem)" ("I'm Going (Like I'm Not Going, But I'm Going)")	Ž. Milenković, M. Bajagić
4.	"Tamara"	M. Bajagić
5.	"Neka svemir čuje nemir" ("May The Universe Hear The Unrest")	Indian traditional, M. Bajagić
6.	"Dvadeseti Vek" ("Twentieth Century")	M. Bajagić
7.	"Dobro jutro, džezeri" ("Good Morning, Jazzers")	M. Bajagić
8.	"220 u voltima" ("220 Volts")	M. Bajagić
9.	"Plavi safir" ("Blue Sapphire")	M. Bajagić
10.	"Kad hodaš" ("When You Walk")	M. Bajagić
11.	"Ruski voz" ("Russian Train")	Ž. Milenković, M. Bajagić
12.	"Zažmuri" ("Close Your Eyes")	M. Bajagić
13.	"Poljubi me" ("Kiss Me")	M. Bajagić
14.	"Limene trube" ("Brass Trumpets")	M. Bajagić
15.	"Ja mislim 300 na sat" ("I Think 300 Per Hour")	M. Bajagić
16.	"Tišina" ("Silence")	M. Bajagić
17.	"Tonski zapis sa koncerta u Kulušiću 8.12.'84." ("Audio recording from the concert in Kulušić on December 8, 1984.")

== Personnel ==
- Momčilo Bajagić - vocals, guitar, acoustic guitar, arranged by
- Žika Milenković - vocals, arranged by
- Miroslav Cvetković - bass guitar, backing vocals, arranged by
- Saša Lokner - keyboards, backing vocals, arranged by
- Nenad Stamatović - guitar, backing vocals
- Vladimir Golubović - drums, backing vocals, arranged by

=== Additional personnel ===
- Saša Habić - producer
- Ivan Vlatković - producer ("220 u voltima" and "Tišina" only), recorded by
- Mladen Škalec - recorded by
- Milovan Macanović - recorded by ("220 u voltima" and "Tišina" only)
- Petar Bojmić - engineer
- Đorđe Petrović - engineer (on "220 u voltima" and "Tišina" only)
- Zoran Vujkević - mixed by
- Jan Šaš - mixed by ("220 u voltima" and "Tišina" only)
