= Hodi (album) =

Studio album by Van Gogh
- Released: 1996
- Genre: Rock
- Length: 47:58
- Label: PGP-RTS
- Producer: Saša Habić

Van Gogh chronology
Strast (1993)	Hodi (1996)	No Comment (1997)

Hodi (trans. Come) is the fourth studio album from Serbian rock band Van Gogh, released in 1996.

== Track listing ==
1. "Put" – 3:50
2. "Polje snova" – 4:19
3. "Zamisli" – 4:26
4. "Apsolutno ne" – 3:18
5. "Delfin" – 4:29
6. "Hodi" – 3:38
7. "Godine (I ko se boji, ne postoji)" – 4:19
8. "Tamo daleko" – 4:04
9. "Kiselina" – 3:43
10. "Klatno" – 2:55
11. "SP & SP" – 2:23

=== Bonus tracks ===
12. "Luna (Live)" – 5:25
13. "Vertigo" – 1:09

== Personnel ==
- Zvonimir Đukić - guitar, vocals
- Aleksandar Barać - bass guitar
- Srboljub Radivojević - drums
