= Van Gogh (Van Gogh album) =

Studio album by Van Gogh
- Released: 1986
- Recorded: May–June, 1986; Studio V PGP-RTB, Belgrade
- Genre: Rock; Alternative rock
- Length: 36:11
- Label: PGP-RTB
- Producer: Đorđe Petrović

Van Gogh chronology
Van Gogh (1986)	Svet je moj (1991)

Reissue cover

Van Gogh is the debut studio album from the Serbian and former Yugoslav rock band Van Gogh, released in 1986. Soon after the album release Van Gogh disbanded, only to reunite in 1990.

Van Gogh is the band's only album that does not feature Zvonimir Đukić on vocals, but on guitar only. The album was originally released by PGP-RTB in 1986, and rereleased in 2001 by Metropolis Records.

== Track listing ==
All the music was written by Zvonimir Đukić. All the lyrics were written by Goran Milisavljević, except for "Tragovi prošlosti" lyrics, written by Đukić and Milisavljević.

1. "Menjam se" – 3:33
2. "Glorija" – 3:14
3. "Noćno nebo" – 3:51
4. "Kako zove se..." – 4:12
5. "Tragovi prošlosti" – 3:44
6. "Ja znam" – 4:15
7. "Tvoj smeh" – 3:37
8. "Tiho hodam" – 4:36
9. "Za kim zvona zvone" – 5:12

== Personnel ==
- Goran Milisavljević - vocals
- Zvonimir Đukić - guitar
- Predrag Popović - bass guitar
- Srboljub Radivojević - drums
- Đorđe Petrović - keyboards, recording, producer
