= Zoran Lalović =

Serbian musician

- Born: January 24, 1950; Belgrade, SFR Yugoslavia
- Died: May 3, 2015 (aged 65); Belgrade, Serbia
- Other names: Lotke

Zoran "Lotke" Lalović (Serbian Cyrillic: Зоран Лаловић; January 24, 1950 – May 3, 2015) was a Serbian musician, producer and singer of heavy metal band Kraljevski Apartman.

With Serbian musician Zoran Zdravković, in 1995 he decided to form a new band named Kraljevski Apartman. In 2014, he was diagnosed with kidney cancer, which quickly metastasized to the lungs. His last appearance was at the Republic Square in Belgrade on December 31, 2014. Lalović died on May 3, 2015, at 65.
