= Oktobar 1864 (album) =

Studio album by Oktobar 1864
- Released: 1987
- Recorded: November–December 1986
- Studio: Studio O, Belgrade
- Genre: Funk rock; jazz pop; blue-eyed soul
- Label: Jugodisk
- Producer: Saša Habić

Oktobar 1864 chronology
Oktobar 1864 (1987)	Igra bojama (1988)

Oktobar 1864 is the first studio album by Yugoslav rock band Oktobar 1864, released in 1987.

== Background and recording ==
Formed in 1984 by guitarist Goran Tomanović, Oktobar 1864 initially went through numerous lineup changes, before it, fronted by vocalist Tanja Jovićević, gained prominence in 1985 and 1986 by winning several prominent festivals. The band recorded their debut album during November and December 1986 in Studio O in Belgrade. The album was produced by Saša Habić, and featured guest appearances by Jovan Maljoković on saxophone, Zoran Lazarević on bass guitar, Bojan Zulfikarpašić—who also co-authored the song "Morning" ("Jutro")—on keyboards, and former S Vremena Na Vreme members Ljuba Ninković and Asim Sarvan on backing vocals.

The album included the song "Nađi me" ("Find Me"), which was the band's version of Yugoslav jazz singer Nada Knežević's cover of the Four Tops song "Reach Out I'll Be There".

== Track listing ==
- All song written by Oktobar 1864, except where noted.

A side
No.	Title	Lyrics	Music	Length
1.	"Nađi me" ("Find Me")		Holland-Dozier-Holland	3:12
2.	"Carte Blanche"	Zoki Milinković	Oktobar 1864	2:28
3.	"Jutro" ("Morning")	Strahinja Knežević	Oktobar 1864; Bojan Zulfikarpašić	5:37
4.	"Grad" ("City")			2:23

B side
No.	Title	Lyrics	Music	Length
1.	"Pomisli" ("Think")			2:01
2.	"Muzika noći" ("Music of the Night")			2:48
3.	"Kiše" ("Rains")	Strahinja Knežević	Oktobar 1864	3:32
4.	"Glasovi" ("Voices")			3:56
5.	"Senke" ("Shadows")			2:34

== Personnel ==
=== Oktobar 1864 ===
- Tanja Jovićević - vocals
- Goran Tomanović - guitar
- Željko Mitrović - bass guitar
- Ivan Zečević - drums
- Dean Krmpotić - keyboards
- Marko Lalić - saxophone
- Branko Baćović - trumpet
- Nebojša Mrvaljević - trombone

=== Additional personnel ===
- Saša Habić - production, keyboards
- Bojan Zulfikarpašić - keyboards
- Zoran Lazarević - bass guitar
- Jova Maljoković - saxophone
- Ljuba Ninković - backing vocals (on track 1)
- Asim Sarvan - backing vocals (on track 1)
- Nena - backing vocals (on track 2)
- Zoran Milinković - backing vocals (on track 4)
- Igor Borojević - recorded by
- Oliver Jovanović - recorded by
- Vladimir Radibratović - album cover
- Nikola Matković - photography

== Reception ==
The album was well-received by Yugoslav music press and public, with the songs "Carte Blanche" "Pomisli" and "Nađi me" becoming hits.
