= Svet je moj =

Studio album by Van Gogh
- Released: 1991
- Genre: Rock; Alternative rock
- Length: 33:39
- Label: PGP-RTB
- Producer: Vladimir Barjaktarević

Van Gogh chronology
Van Gogh (1986)	Svet je moj (1991)	Strast (1993)

Svet je moj (trans. The World Is Mine) is the second studio album from Serbian rock band Van Gogh, released in 1991. Svet je moj is the first Van Gogh album released after their 1990 reunion.

== Track listing ==
All songs were written by Zvonimir Đukić, except where noted.

1. "Dibuk" – 3:43
2. "Neko te ima" (Z. Đukić, G. Milisavljević) – 3:41
3. "Svet je moj" (Z. Đukić, G. Milisavljević) – 2:36
4. "Gubiš me" – 3:25
5. "Smeh na usnama" – 3:10
6. "Policija" - 2:51
7. "Linija" – 4:09
8. "Glas" – 3:11
9. "Ima li ljubavi" – 3:12
10. "Srce" – 3:00
11. "Daleki svet" (Z. Đukić, G. Milisavljević) – 3:32

== Personnel ==
- Zvonimir Đukić - guitar, vocals
- Aleksandar Barać - bass guitar
- Vladan Cvetković - drums
- Vladimir Barjaktarević - keyboards, producer

== Legacy ==
The song "Neko te ima" was polled in 2000 as 6th on Rock Express Top 100 Yugoslav Rock Songs of All Times list. In 2011, the same song was voted, by the listeners of Radio 202, one of 60 greatest songs released by PGP-RTB/PGP-RTS during the sixty years of the label's existence.
