= Braća Left =

Serbian alternative rock band

- Braća Left in 1996

Background information
- Origin: Belgrade, Serbia, FR Yugoslavia
- Genres: Alternative rock; rock
- Years active: 1992–1996
- Label: ITMM
- Past members: Goran Milanović; Goran Tomanović; Ljuba Tomanović; Miodrag Šuša

Braća Left (Serbian Cyrillic: Браћа Лефт; trans. The Left Brothers) was a Serbian alternative rock band formed in Belgrade in 1992. Founded by former Oktobar 1864 and Armagedon members, Braća Left was a prominent act of the 1990s Serbian rock scene.

== History ==
The band was formed in 1992 by former Oktobar 1864 members Goran Tomanović (guitar) and his brother Ljuba Tomanović (bass guitar) with the former Armagedon members Miodrag Šuša (guitar) and Goran Milanović (drums). Vocal duties were equally shared among the guitarists Tomanović and Šuša.

In the spring of 1994 the band released their debut album ,Braća Left 1, through the record label ITMM, showing their interest for standard rock sound with alternative elements, and abandoning the funk rock style of Oktobar 1864. The album, recorded at the Belgrade Go-Go studio in January 1994, featured eleven tracks written by the band themselves and was produced by Vojislav "Voja" Aralica. During the same year, the band's tracks "Ćao bejbi" ("Bye, Bye, Baby") and "Zaboravljaš" ("You Forget"), for both of which the band had recorded promotional videos, appeared on the ITMM various artists compilation New Rock Power '93-94.

In late 1996, the band recorded their second and last studio album Braća Left 2, also produced by Aralica, featuring former Oktobar 1864 vocalist Tanja Jovićević as guest backing vocalist on the track "Anđeo" ("Angel"). The album, recorded in July 1996 at the Go-Go studio, featured eleven songs, including "Aikido" for which the band recorded a promotional video.

After the album release, the band split up. Šuša joined the rapcore band Straight Jackin', also working as a painter and actor, appearing in the movies In the Middle of Nowhere by Miša Radivojević and Marble Ass by Želimir Žilnik. Goran Tomanović became the music editor at the City Records record label, and in 2000 he formed the electronic and ambiental music group Manú.

== Legacy ==
The song "Aikido" was covered in 2013 by Serbian alternative rock band Bjesovi.

In 2021 the album Braća Left 2 was polled 81st on the list of 100 Best Serbian Albums Since the Breakup of SFR Yugoslavia. The list was published in the book Kako (ni)je propao rokenrol u Srbiji (How Rock 'n' Roll in Serbia (Didn't) Came to an End).

== Discography ==
=== Studio albums ===
- Braća Left 1 (1994)
- Braća Left 2 (1996)
