= Radovan Jovićević =

Radovan Jovićević (Serbian Cyrillic: Радован Јовићевић) is a Serbian pop-rock/folk music composer, producer and band leader. Born in Belgrade on 31 January 1956, he has lived in New York City since 1999.

== Balkan Years ==
Radovan’s career began at the end of the seventies, when he established Zana, the first Balkan band that successfully combined new wave sound with commercial pop.

Helped by keyboardist Zoran Živanović, singer Zana Nimani (his high school girlfriend) and Marina Tucaković (the most successful lyricist in Yugoslav pop/folk music), Radovan paved the way of commercial success for many other young new wave bands in Yugoslavia. Although Zana’s first album Loše vesti uz rege za pivsku flašu was experimental with sound, the second, Dodirni mi kolena, was pop-oriented and sold in over 500,000 copies. Songs from this album are still being covered by contemporary pop-rock bands in the Balkans. Their third album Natrag na voz was another success thanks to the song that topped the charts – "Jabuke i vino": a duo by Zana Nimani and Željko Bebek (singer of Bijelo dugme). After Zana Nimani left the band for a solo career in the mid-eighties, Jovićević and Živanović changed a few female singers, but continued in the same musical directions, adding Balkan ethno elements to their songs.

In "Vejte snegovi" (1987) they collaborated with a legendary folk clarinetist, Boki Milošević. As a multi-talented artist, together with music composing/producing, Jovićević got involved in the production of Zana’s music videos. He also composed for the most popular Serbian folk singers and had top chart hits.

== New York Years ==
Distracted by the Yugoslav political/economic crisis in the nineties and challenged by his international career Jovićević, his wife Gordana, and their son, Nikola, left for New York City in 1999. His American career started in the field of computer animation/web design further developing into a movie soundtrack production. Until then, he had composed music for Bought and Sold (2003), The Meeting (2005), Recalled (2006), And Then Came Love (2007).

Working in the movie industry, in 2005 he met actor/musician Manu Narayan. Realizing that they share similar musical ideas, Jovićević and Narayan formed the duo Darunam and soon after published CD All That’s Beautiful Must Die (2007). Darunam’s music can be defined as a blend of modern pop sounds and world beats.

In their 2010 studio release, Jovićević and Narayan joined forces with Serbian/Canadian clarinet virtuoso Milan Milošević on the world music/theatrical project The Last Angel on Earth. Created mostly in cyberspace from different sides of the continent (Milošević lives in Vancouver), songs are inspired by/dedicated to angels and deities originated from the world’s major religions. In a year-long creative process, Jovićević draw skeletons for the eclectic musical pieces in his NYC studio, while Milošević and Narayan have given them wings by sending their sound parts through the Internet..

Currently, Jovicevic is working with Narayan and Playwright Aditi Kapil on a new theatre project with music. The collaborators were selected and took part in the June 2014 Berkeley Repertory Theatre's GroundFloor Writer's Retreat.

== See also ==
- Popular music in the Socialist Federal Republic of Yugoslavia
