= Crni ples =

Studio album by Oktobar 1864
- Released: 1990
- Recorded: March 1990
- Studio: RTV Titograd studio
- Genre: Funk rock; jazz pop; blue-eyed soul
- Label: PGP-RTB
- Producer: Oktobar 1864, Theodore Yanni

Oktobar 1864 chronology
Igra bojama (1988)	Crni ples (1990)	Najbolje (1997)

Professional ratings
Review scores
Source	Rating
Ritam	5/5 stars

Crni ples (trans. Black Dance) is the third and last studio album by the Yugoslav rock band Oktobar 1864, released in 1990.

== Background and recording ==
Following the success of their second studio album, the 1988 Igra bojama (Play With Colors) and a number of concerts in Yugoslavia and several concerts abroad, the band started working on their third album, making preparations for the recording in Zemun's Pink studio, owned by the band's former bass guitarist Željko Mitrović. The album was recorded in the studio of RTV Titograd in March 1990. The album was produced by Theodore Yanni and the band members, and featured guest appearances by Deže Molnar on tenor and alto saxophone and keyboards, Dragan Kozarčić on trumpet, Anton Horvat on baritone saxophone, Milan Mladenović on backing vocals, Blagoje Nedeljković of the band Rock Street on drums (in "Denis") and Ted Yanni on guitar (solo in "Crni ples").

The album cover was, as the cover for the band's previous album, designed by comic book artist Zoran Janjetov.

== Track listing ==
All songs written by Oktobar 1864, except where noted.

A side
No.	Title	Lyrics	Music	Length
1.	"Crni ples" ("Black Dance")			3:56
2.	"Miris predgrađa" ("Smell of the Suburbs")	EXT art group	Oktobar 1864	5:03
3.	"Twilight"			4:19
4.	"Denis"			3:06

B side
No.	Title	Lyrics	Music	Length
1.	"E 7/9"	EXT art group	Oktobar 1864	3:47
2.	"Put" ("Road")			4:20
3.	"Osećam za tebe" ("I Feel for You")			3:53
4.	"***"			4:45
5.	"Pat, Bill & Jesse"			3:03

== Personnel ==
- Tanja Jovićević - vocals
- Goran Tomanović - guitar
- Ljuba Tomanović - bass guitar
- Ivan Zečević - drums
- Dejan Abadić - keyboards
- Slobodan Andrić - saxophone
- Branko Baćović - trumpet
- Vuk Dinić - trombone

=== Additional personnel ===
- Deže Molnar - saxophone
- Anton Horvat - saxophone
- Dragan Kozarčić - trumpet
- Blagoje Nedeljković - drums (on track A4)
- Orhan Begovski - percussion
- Milan Mladenović - backing vocals
- Theodore Yanni - producer, recorded by, guitar (solo on track A1)
- Aleksandar Dujin - music arrangements (brass section)
- Slobodan Stanišić - recorded by
- Zoran Janjetov - cover design
- Dragan Jojkić - photography

== Reception ==
The album was, as the band's previous two releases, well received by audience and critics alike. It brought the hits "Crni ples", "Miris predgrađa", "Denis" and "Put". However, despite large popularity and praises coming from Yugoslav music critics, due to the outbreak of the Yugoslav Wars in 1991, the band members decided to end their activity. They held their farewell concert in Students' Cultural Center in Belgrade in January 1992.

== Legacy ==
In 2011, the song "Crni ples" was polled, by the listeners of Radio 202, one of 60 greatest songs released by PGP-RTB/PGP-RTS during the sixty years of the label's existence.
