= Strast =

Studio album by Van Gogh
- Released: 1993
- Recorded: March 1993; Studio V RTB, Belgrade
- Genre: Rock
- Length: 36:49
- Label: PGP-RTS
- Producer: Saša Habić; Vladimir Barjakaterević

Van Gogh chronology
Svet je moj (1991)	Strast (1993)	Hodi (1996)

Professional ratings
Review scores
Source	Rating
Ritam	3/5 stars

Strast (trans. Passion) is the third studio album from Serbian rock band Van Gogh, released 1993.

The album was produced by Saša Habić, except for the track "Strast" which was produced by Vladimir Barjakaterević.

== Track listing ==
All songs were written by Zvonimir Đukić, except where noted

1. "Basna" – 3:45
2. "Buldožer" (Z. Đukić, A. Barać) – 3:22
3. "Muzička kuća" – 3:31
4. "Sreća" – 5:57
5. "Strast" – 3:40
6. "Mama" – 4:42
7. "Manitua Mi" – 4:04
8. "Haleluja" – 3:31
9. "Extaza" – 3:08
10. "Vahađa – 1:09

== Personnel ==
- Zvonimir Đukić - guitar, vocals
- Aleksandar Barać - bass guitar
- Srboljub Radivojević - drums

=== Guest musicians ===
- Dragoslav Stanisavljević - trumpet
- Marija Mihajlović - vocals
- Marko Đorđević - trumpet
- Pera Joe - harmonica
- Rambo Amadeus - guitar

== Legacy ==
The song "Mama" was polled in 2000 as 52nd on Rock Express Top 100 Yugoslav Rock Songs of All Times list.
