= Kolo (album) =

Studio album by Van Gogh
- Released: 2006
- Recorded: Sky Studio
- Genre: Rock; Power pop Folk rock
- Length: 37:34
- Label: PGP-RTS
- Producer: Vlada Negovanović; Voja Aralica

Van Gogh chronology
DrUnder (2002)	Kolo (2006)	Srećno Novo UžiVo (2007)

Kolo (named after a traditional dance from the Balkans) is the seventh studio album by Serbian rock band Van Gogh, released in 2006. The album was recorded in Studio Sky and mastered in Sony Music Studios in New York City.

The track "Kolo (Ludo luda)" features lyrics inspired by a folk poem "Riba i devojka" recorded by Vuk Stefanović Karadžić.

== Track listing ==
All the songs were written by Zvonimir Đukić, except where noted

1. "Kolo" - 2:45
2. "Vrteška" (S. Radivojević, Z. Đukić) - 2:57
3. "Plastelin" - 2:53
4. "Do kraja sveta" - 4:28
5. "Dišem" - 4:13
6. "Spisak razloga" - 3:15
7. "Deo oko tebe" (S. Radivojević, Z. Đukić) - 3:09
8. "Suđeno mi je" - 3:40
9. "Od kad te nema" - 3:22
10. "Emigrant" - 4:07
11. "Ljubav je" - 4:05

== Personnel ==
- Zvonimir Đukić - vocals, guitar, acoustic guitar, mandolin, accordion
- Dejan Ilić - bass guitar, acoustic guitar
- Srboljub Radivojević - drums, backing vocals, drum programming

=== Additional personnel ===
- Alis Dunjica - backing vocals (on "Do kraja sveta")
- Ana Rajković - backing vocals (on "Suđeno mi je")
- Kristina Savić - backing vocals (on "Suđeno mi je")
- Bane Crepajac - guitar (solo on "Emigrant")
- Marko Đorđević - trumpet (on "Emigrant")
- Vlada Negovanović - producer (tracks: 1, 2 3, 6, 7, 11)
- Voja Aralica - producer (tracks: 4, 5, 8. 9 10)
- James Cruz - mastering
- Boris Gavrilovć - recorded by
