= No Comment (Van Gogh album) =

Live album by Van Gogh
- Released: 1997
- Recorded: January 23 and 24, 1997; SKC, Belgrade
- Genre: Rock
- Length: 65:30
- Label: Metropolis Records

Van Gogh chronology
'Hodi' (1995)	No Comment (1997)	'Opasan ples' (1999)

Back cover

No Comment is the first live album by Serbian rock band Van Gogh. The album was recorded on the band's concerts held on January 23 and 24, 1997 in Studentski kulturni centar in Belgrade.

The track "Zemlja čuda" features a medley inspired by Lou Reed's "Walk on the Wild Side", The Doors' "Light My Fire", The Rolling Stones' "You Can't Always Get What You Want", Stereo MCs' "Connected", and Elvis Presley's "Can't Help Falling in Love".

== Track listing ==
The album back cover and inner sleeve do not feature song titles, but different colors in the places where song titles should be. These are the correct titles:

All songs were written by Zvonimir Đukić, except where noted.

1. "Extaza" – 4:37
2. "Manitua mi" – 3:18
3. "Gubiš me" – 4:05
4. "SP & SP" – 2:19
5. "Haleluja" – 4:32
6. "Zemlja čuda" – 10:53
7. "Tragovi prošlosti" (Z. Đukić, G. Milisavljević) – 4:36
8. "Klatno" (A. Barać, Z. Đukić) – 3:50
9. "Buldožer" – 4:32
10. "Sreća" – 7:04
11. "Basna" – 3:53
12. "Kiselina" (S. Radivojević, A. Barać, Z. Đukić) – 5:12
13. "Neko te ima" (Z. Đukić, G. Milosavljević) – 6:34

== Personnel ==
- Zvonimir Đukić - guitar vocals
- Aleksandar Barać - bass guitar
- Srboljub Radivojević - drums

=== Additional personnel ===
- Gordana Svilarević - backing vocals
- Ceca Slavković - backing vocals
- Vlada Negovanović - producer, recorded by

== Legacy ==
The version of the song "Klatno" from the album was polled in 2000 as 40th on Rock Express Top 100 Yugoslav Rock Songs of All Times list.
