= Igre bez pravila =

Studio album by Kraljevski Apartman
- Released: November 2012
- Recorded: Studio Dobro Polje, Belgrade; 2012
- Genres: Hard rock Heavy metal
- Label: Power Music
- Producer: Zoran Lalović

Kraljevski Apartman chronology
Čuvar tajni (2008)	Igre bez pravila (2012)

Professional ratings
Review scores
Source	Rating
Balkanrock.com	3/5 stars
Muzika.hr	3.5/5 stars
Nocturne	6.5/10 stars

Igre bez pravila (trans. Games without rules) is the sixth studio album by Serbian heavy metal band Kraljevski Apartman, released in 2012.

The album features vocalist Zoran "Lotke" Lalović, who left the band in 2007, only to return in 2008, just several months after the band released the album Čuvar tajni with vocalist Ivan Đerković. Lalović also served as the album's producer. Igre bez pravila is the band's second album recorded with bass guitarist Vladimir Rajčić, who also appeared on the band's first album, Long Live Rock 'n' Roll.

The single "Pandora", along with the music video, was released in 2009, as the announcement for the new album. The album features a re-recorded version of song "Dama iz kraljevskog apartmana", originally released in 2002 on the album Rocker.

== Track listing ==
All songs were written by Zoran Zdravković except where noted.

1. "Zona sumraka" – 4:20
2. "Igre bez pravila" – 4:58
3. "Nebeski sud" (Z. Zdravković, Z. Radovanović) – 4:54
4. "Magija" – 5:23
5. "Šta ću sa tobom" – 3:01
6. "Pustiću glas u tvoje ime" – 4:36
7. "Ti mi noćas trebaš" – 4:39
8. "Kreni" (Z. Lalović, R. Lalović) – 3:46
9. "Dodaj gas" – 4:25
10. "Kuda ideš" – 3:51
11. "Teško se sa tobom izlazi na kraj" – 3:29
12. "Pandora" – 4:54
13. "Dama iz kraljevskog apartmana" – 4:27

== Personnel ==
- Zoran Lalović – vocals
- Zoran Zdravković – guitar
- Zoran Radovanović – drums
- Vladimir Rajčić – bass
- Nebojša Maksimović – keyboards

=== Additional personnel ===
- Slobodan Ignjetijević – keyboards (on tracks: 4, 9, 13)
- Marko Cvetković – keyboards (on tracks: 4, 9, 13), producer
- Rade Marić – bass guitar (on tracks: 4, 9, 13)
- Dragan Petrović – acoustic guitar (on tracks: 3, 7), co-producer
- Lana Toković – keyboards (on tracks: 3, 7)
- Dragan Mars – cover design
