= Zana (band) =

Serbian musical group

- Origin: Belgrade, Serbia
- Genres: New wave; synthpop; pop rock; pop
- Years active: 1979–present
- Labels: Jugoton, PGP-RTB, Diskoton, PGP-RTS, City Records
- Members: Zoran Živanović; Jelena Galonić; Milica Rančić; Miljan Davidović; Dejan Trajković; Zoran Jakšić
- Past members: Radovan Jovićević; Zana Nimani; Marina Tucaković; Igor Jovanović; Bogdan Dragović; Aleksandar Ivanov; Pavle Nikolić; Aleksandar Radulović; Miloš Stojisavljević; Predrag Jakovljević; Nataša Gajović; Zoran Babović; Nataša Živković; Zoran Jakšić; Saša Al Hamed

Zana is a Serbian rock and pop group formed in Belgrade in 1979.

Formed by guitarist Radovan Jovićević, keyboardist Zoran Živanović and vocalist Zana Nimani, Zana was initially a part of the Yugoslav new wave scene. With their second album they turned towards more commercial synth-pop and achieved large mainstream popularity. Until the mid-1980s the band had moved from their initial new wave and synth-pop sound towards pop rock and pop. After the departure of Zana Nimani in 1984, Jovićević and Živanović continued to lead the band, changing two vocalists, Nataša Gajović and Nataša Živković. During the 1990s, Zana worked as a pop trio consisting of Jovićević, Živanović and vocalist Jelena Galonić. In 1999, Jovićević left the group, leaving Živanović and Galonić as the only official members of Zana. In the 2010s Živanović and Galonić formed a new Zana lineup, making a return to pop rock format.

== History ==
=== The beginnings (1976–1979) ===
Guitarist Radovan Jovićević and keyboardist Zoran Živanović "Kikamac" started to work together in 1976, playing in several high school bands. At the end of the 1970s, they were both members of the band Suton (Dusk). On a school dance in Saint Sava elementary school in Belgrade, on which Suton performed, Jovićević brought his girlfriend-at-the-time Zana Nimani. She sang, having her first performance with Jovićević and Živanović. In 1979, Jovićević, Živanović and Nimani decided to start performing under the name Zana. The first lineup of Zana featured, beside Jovićević, Živanović and Nimani, guitarist Igor Jovanović, bass guitarist Bogdan Dragović and drummer Aleksandar Ivanov.

The band soon managed to get a term to record some of their songs in Radio Belgrade's Studio VI, where they were spotted by lyricist Marina Tucaković, who had previously worked with Srđan Marjanović, DAG, YU Grupa, Bisera Veletanlić, Ambasadori, Dado Topić, Slađana Milošević and other acts. She got interested in the band, and soon became their lyricist and an official member.

=== Zana Nimani years (1979–1984) ===
In 1980, Zana recorded their first 7-inch single, featuring the songs "Nastavnice" ("Hey, Teacher"), recorded with a children's choir, and "Sveta". They were declined by Belgrade-based record label PGP-RTB, but soon after signed for Zagreb-based Jugoton, which released the single. The band promoted the single on their live performances, alternative music saxophonist Paul Pignon occasionally performing with them. Zana had their first public performance in Belgrade in November 1980, performing as an opening act on Generacija 5 concert in Pionir Hall. Their followup 7-inch single was also suceessful, released as the double-A-side with the songs "Moj deda" ("My Grandfather") and "Pepito pantalone" ("Pepito Pants"). In 1981, Jugoton refused to give Zana unlimited time in studio to record their debut album, so the band moved to PGP-RTB, for which they released the reggae-influenced single "Leto" ("Summer"), intentionally releasing it in May, hoping it would become a summer hit. It was later revealed in the Yugoslav press that with "Leto" Zana plagiarized "Matador" by Garland Jeffreys, but it did not influence the song's success on the charts. Due to the success of "Leto", Jugoton agreed to Zana's terms, so the band signed back to Jugoton.

The band's debut album, Loše vesti uz rege za pivsku flašu (Bad News Accompanied by Reggae for a Beer Bottle) was released in 1981. It was recorded in Jugoton's Studio VI, and produced by the band members themselves. On the album, Živanović was signed as "Kikamac" only in order to avoid being confused with Zoran Živanović "Hoze" of the band Mama Co Co, to whom Kikamac's fees were often mistakenly paid. The album brought the hits "Jutro me podseća na to" ("Morning Reminds Me of It"), "On" ("He"), "Miševi beli celu noć" ("White Mice All Night") and "Loše vesti" ("Bad News"), the latter featuring altered lyrics, because Jugoton editors demanded the original politically provocative lyrics to be changed. In their home city the band promoted the album with a concert in Dadov Theatre. On a fund-raising concert in Sarajevo they performed as an opening act for Bijelo Dugme. The December 1981 mini-tour across Serbia was ended when Aleksandar Ivanov left the band due to his mandatory stint in the Yugoslav army. Ivanov was temporarily replaced by Pavle "Paja Banana" Nikolić, a former member of the band Dragoljubov Taxi.

The band's second album, Dodirni mi kolena (Touch My Knees) was recorded in Sweden during May 1982, with the help of saxophonist Goran Nillson, percussionist Byl Gunnar Byllin, and multi-instrumentalist, recorder and producer Tini Varga, who also coauthored lyrics for two songs on the album. During the album recording, Tucaković stopped being the band's official member, but would continued to write lyrics for them. With Dodirni mi kolena the group moved to more commercial sound. The album brought synth-pop-oriented hits "Dodirni mi kolena", "Majstor za poljupce" ("Kisses Maestro"), "13 je moj srećan broj" ("13 Is My Lucky Number"), and the album saw high number sales. In September, the same month when the album was released, Jovanović left the band due to his army stint, and was temporarily replaced by Aleksandar Radulović "Futa".

At the end of 1982, the band went on a tour across Serbia, Macedonia, Herzegovina and Dalmatia, however, the concerts saw bad reviews in the Yugoslav music press, as the band's live performances failed to reach the standards of their studio recordings. In May 1983, Jovanović and Ivanov returned to the band, and Nikolić and Radulović left. Soon after, Bogdan Dragović left, forming the band Zamba with Aleksandar Radulović, guitarist Nikola Čuturilo and drummer Predrag "Bata" Jakovljević, the group releasing their only studio album, Udarac nisko (Low Kick), in 1983. Zana's new bass guitarist became Miloš Stojisavljević "Cajger", a former member of Generacija 5.

In August 1983, Zana recorded their third studio album, entitled Natrag na voz (Back to the Train). The album was, as the band's previous release, recorded in Sweden and produced by Tini Varga. The album's biggest hits were the duet "Jabuke i vino" ("Apples and Wine"), sung by Nimani and Željko Bebek (the band initially considered Daniel, Oliver Mandić, Jura Stublić, or Branimir "Džoni" Štulić for the song) and "Mladiću moj" ("My Boy"). The title track also featured Bebek on vocals. At the time of album release, the end of 1983, Ivanov left the band, and was replaced by Predrag Jakovljević (formerly of Zamba). After leaving the band, Ivanov dedicated himself to a career in marketing. He has moved to New Zealand, where he hosted a music show on a local radio, played in The Beatles tribute band The Zeatles and in the band Melody Boys which performed covers of Yugoslav rock hits.

In February 1984, Zana went on a promotional tour, but as the audience showed little interest in their concerts, they ended the tour in March. Soon after, Jovičić and Kikamac went to serve the army, the band went on hiatus, and Nimani decided to start a solo career. After the release of her only solo album Noćas pevam samo tebi (Tonight I Sing only for You) in 1986, she married, retired from music and eventually moved to Canada.

=== Nataša Gajović and Nataša Živković years (1985–1990) ===
The logo used by the band on several of their releases, appearing for the first time on their 1988 self-titled album

In 1985, Jovićević and Živanović reformed Zana with the new vocalist, Nataša Gajović. With the album Zana, unofficially known as Crvene lale (Red Tulips) after the first track, released in 1985 and produced by Saša Habić, they moved towards pop and pop rock sound. The album brought the hits "Još ovaj dan" ("One More Day"), "Pahulje" ("Snowflakes") and "Nikad nedeljom" ("Never on Sunday"). Their next album, Otkinimo noćas zajedno (Let's Get Crazy Tonight Together) was released in 1987. It was recorded with the new drummer Zoran "Babonja" Babović and produced by Dušan Petrović "Šane". The album brought folk-influenced hit "Vejte snegovi" ("Fall Heavily, Snows"), which featured guest appearance by Boki Milošević on clarinet. The 1988 album Zana, produced by Tini Varga, featured Mladen Vojičić Tifa, Laza Ristovski and Miroslav Sedak Benčić as guests. The album brought the hits "Oženićeš se ti, udaću se ja" ("You Will Get Married, I Will Get Married"), "Vojna pošta" ("Military Post") and "Vlak" ("Train").

In 1989, Gajović left the band, retiring from music and moving to Saudi Arabia. Following her departure, other members also left the band, so Jovićević and Živanović reformed Zana with Nataša Živković (vocals), Zoran Jakšić (bass guitar) and Saša Al Hamed (drums). The new lineup recorded the album Zana, also known as Rukuju se, rukuju (They're Saying Goodbye, They're Saying Goodbye) after its biggest hit. The album was produced by Jovićević, Živanović and Laza Ristovski and released in 1989. The track "E, moj doktore" ("Oh, Doctor") featured folk singer Dragana Mirković on vocals, and the song "Napravite mostove" ("Build Bridges") featured the girl group Šarmerke on vocals. After only two years spent with Zana, Živković joined Hare Krishna and withdrawn from the scene. In 1990, to celebrate ten years of activity, Jovićević and Živanović released the compilation album Najlepše pesme 1980-1990 (Most Beautiful Songs 1980 - 1990).

=== Jelena Galonić years (1991–1999) ===
With Zana's fourth singer, Jelena Galonić, Jovićević and Živanović recorded the albums Zana in 1991, featuring the pop-oriented hit "Nisam, nisam (Devojka tvoga druga)" ("I'm Not, I'm Not (Your Friend's Girlfriend)"), and Tražim (I'm Searching), released in 1993, featuring the rock-oriented hit "Priča se, priča (Da Rusi dolaze)" ("They're Saying, They're Saying (That the Russians are Coming)").

At the beginning of 1996, the compilation album Zlatni hitovi 1980 - 1995 (Golden Hits 1980 - 1995) was released, featuring two new songs, "Modrice" ("Bruises") and "Gušti, gušti" (a cover of the song by Istrian singer Alan Vitasović), the videos for which were recorded at Thailand. The album Zanomanija (Zanomania), released in 1997 and featuring dance-pop elements, featured a remixed version of "Modirce" and "Gušti, gušti" and a cover of Time song "Da li znaš da te volim" ("Did You Know that I Love You"). The album's biggest hit was the ballad "Nije sve tako crno" ("Not Everything Is So Dark"). In the autumn of 1998, they released the live album Zana uživo (Zana Live), recorded on their concert held in Sava Centar on 1 November 1997. The album featured singer Brankica Vasić as guest.

=== Zana as a pop duo (1999–2015) ===
At the beginning of 1999, Jovićević moved to the United States, leaving Živanović and Galonić as Zana's only official members. The two recorded the song "Balkanska" ("Balkan Song") for the various artists album Proleće na trgu – Moj Beograd srce ima (Spring on the Square – My Belgrade Has a Heart), featuring protest songs against the NATO bombing of FR Yugoslavia. In 1999, they released the album Prijatelji (Friends), which featured the sound resembling their earlier works. On the song "40", which deals with the life of a middle aged man, Živanović recorded lead vocals for the first time. Beside Zana members, the authors of the lyrics were Marina Tucaković and Bora Đorđević. In 2001, Živanović and Galonić released album 21, featuring songs composed by Živanović on the lyrics by Galonić and Marina Tucaković. The album was produced by Živanović, Galonić and Žika Filipović.

In 2006, Zana released the album Kao nekad (Just like Before). The album featured dance-pop remixes of "Vejte snegovi" and "Dodirni mi kolena", and the song "Znaš li šta je ljubav" ("Do You Know What Love Is") featured guest appearance by tenor Goran Dime. In June 2008, Živanović and Galonić got married. On 29 April 2010, Zana celebrated thirty years of work with a concert in Sava Centar, Nataša Gajović and Nataša Živković making guest appearances on the concert.

On 30 December 2013, the band's former drummer Pavle Nikolić, who spent last years of his life as the owner of the club Tropikana in Accra, Ghana, died in a car accident.

=== Return to rock format (2015–present) ===
In 2015, after a five-year hiatus in their work, the band, in the lineup consisting of Galonić, Živanović, Milica Rančić (drums), Dejan Trajković (guitar), Miljan Davidović (keyboards), Zoran Jakšić (bass guitar), released the single "Maco" ("Honey"). In December 2016, Zana released the single "Stupido", a duet sung by Galonić and the group's former vocalist Nataša Gajović. In 2018, Croatia Records released the box set Original Album Collection, containing all of the band's albums with Nimani on vocals (the first three studio albums), as well as Zana Nimani's only solo album, Noćas pevam samo tebi. In 2022, in order to mark the band's 40th anniversary, PGP-RTS released the box set entitled Dijamantski box set 1980–2022 (Diamond Box Set 1980–2022) containing all 13 studio albums released by the band, the live album Zana uživo, as well as a disc with singles released during the 1980–2022 period. The release also contains a book with press clippings and photographs from various phases of the group's career.

The band's former bass guitarist Bogdan Dragović died in March 2016, and another former bass guitarist for Zana, Miloš Stojisavljević "Cajger" died on 29 January 2024. Marina Tucaković died on 19 September 2021.

== Legacy ==
Croatian and Yugoslav singer Tereza Kesovija recorded a French language version of the song "Dodirni mi kolena", entitled "Danse avant de dormir", in 1983, The song "Mladiću moj" was covered by Serbian pop punk/power pop band Oružjem Protivu Otmičara on their 1996 album BarbieCue. The song "Dodirni mi kolena" was covered by Croatian pop singer Severina on her 1999 album Ja samo pjevam (I just Sing) and by Serbian pop punk band Lude Krawe on their 2007 cover album Sve tuđe (Everything by the Others). The song "Vejte snegovi" was covered by Bosnian progressive metal band Heaven Rain on their 2012 album Second Sun and by Serbian jazz duo Lidija Andonov & Andy Pavlov on their album Mlad & Radostan - Homage to Yugoslav Music from the 80s and Beyond (Young & Joyful - Homage to Yugoslav Music from the 80s and Beyond). The song "Majstor za poljupce" was covered by Serbian jazz singer Lena Kovačević ON her 2013 album San (The Dream).

In 2006, "Mladiću moj" was polled No. 54 on B92 Top 100 Domestic Songs list.

== Discography ==
=== Studio albums ===
- Loše vesti uz rege za pivsku flašu (1981)
- Dodirni mi kolena (1982)
- Natrag na voz (1983)
- Zana (1985)
- Otkinimo noćas zajedno (1987)
- Vojna pošta (1988)
- Rukuju se, rukuju (1989)
- Nisam, nisam (1991)
- Tražim (1993)
- Zanomanija (1997)
- Prijatelji (1999)
- 21 (2001)
- Kao nekad (2006)

=== Live albums ===
- Zana uživo (1998)
- Tri boje zvuka (Live at RTS Studio 8, 2015) (2015)

=== Compilation albums ===
- Najlepše pesme 1980–1990 (1990)
- Zlatni hitovi 1980–1995 (1996)
- 20 zlatnih hitova (1998)
- The Platinum Collection (2009)

=== Box sets ===
- Original Album Collection (2018)
- Dijamantski CD box set 1980–2022 (2022)

=== Singles ===
- "Nastavnice" / "Sveta" (1980)
- "Moj deda" / "Pepito pantalone" (1981)
- "Leto" / "Snovi od slame" (1981)
- "On" / "Ti si neko staro lice" (1981)
- "Majstor za poljupce" / "Pričalica" (1982)
- "Jabuke i vino" (1983)
- "Vejte snegovi" / "Skloni se kad prolazim" (1987)
- "Stupido" / "Maco" (2016)

== See also ==
- New wave music in Yugoslavia
