= Best of Live (1996–2005) =

Best Of Live (1996–2005)

Live album by Kraljevski Apartman
- Released: 2005
- Recorded: SKC, Belgrade, 2005
- Genres: Hard rock Heavy metal
- Length: 73:25
- Label: PGP RTS

Kraljevski Apartman chronology
Ruka pravde (2004)	Best Of Live (1996–2005) (2005)	Čuvar tajni (2008)

Professional ratings
Review scores
Source	Rating
Barikada	link
Serbian-metal.org	favorable link

Best Of Live (1996–2005) is a live album released by Serbian heavy metal band, Kraljevski Apartman, consisting of the band's finest works and presenting an aspect of the band's live appearance. The band members wanted to celebrate the first decade of the band's existence by recording a live performance and releasing it on CD and DVD formats. This resulted the release of this CD and DVD 10 godina sa vama - Live SKC.

== Track listing ==
All songs were written by Zoran Zdravković except where noted.

1. "Nikad se ne predajem" – 8:03
2. "Izaberi jedan put" – 3:46
3. "Rocker" – 3:37
4. "Za ljubav ne treba da moliš" – 6:02
5. "Sve su noći iste" – 3:40
6. "Dama iz K.A." – 3:51
7. "Sve u svoje vreme" – 4:04
8. "Jesen" – 6:13
9. "U lavirintu sedam greha" – 3:52
10. "Izgubljen u vremenu" – 4:28
11. "Dao sam sve od sebe" – 5:27
12. "Ruka pravde" – 6:46
13. "Misterija" – 5:02
14. "Ranjena zver" – 3:53
15. "Znam da život kratko traje" – 4:37

== Personnel ==
- Zoran Lalović – vocals
- Zoran Zdravković – guitar
- Zoran Rončević – drums
- Marko Nikolić – bass guitar
- Dejan Đorđević – keyboards
