= Saša Habić =

- Born: Aleksandar Habić; 17 March 1956 (age 69)
- Origin: Belgrade, Serbia
- Genres: Jazz, pop, rock
- Occupations: Record producer, songwriter, session musician
- Instruments: Guitar, keyboard, cello
- Years active: 1970s–present
- Labels: PGP-RTB, Jugoton, Helidon, Jugodisk, Diskoton, Komuna Belgrade, Metropolis Records, Hi-Fi Centar, Electric Records, BK Sound,

Aleksandar "Saša" Habić (Serbian Cyrillic: Саша Хабић; born 17 March 1956) is a Serbian and Yugoslav musician, record producer and composer.

He's most notable for his music production work. Over his long career as a producer, he worked with a number of prominent Yugoslav musical acts like Piloti, Divlji Anđeli, U Škripcu, Jakarta, Beograd, Dorian Gray, Laki Pingvini, Bebi Dol, Željko Bebek, Luna, Laza Ristovski, Slomljena Stakla, Bajaga i Instruktori, Zana, Kornelije Kovač, Alisa, Dejan Cukić, Oktobar 1864, Rambo Amadeus, YU grupa, Galija, Nikola Čuturilo, Riblja Čorba, Kerber, Vampiri, Ruž, Regina, Van Gogh, Generacija 5, Familija, Smak, Zdravko Čolić, Dragoljub Đuričić, Cactus Jack, and others.

== Career ==
Habić studied at Belgrade Music Academy, string instruments department. At the half of the 1970s he played cello in acoustic rock band Ex Arte, and later keyboards in jazz band Interaction led by saxophonist Paul Pignon. At the end of the 1970s he performed in the theatre play Dragiša, život je čudna stvar (Dragiša, Life Is a Strange Thing), playing bass, directed by conceptual artist Kosta Bunuševac.

Soon after, Habić dedicated himself to record production. His first works included recordings by Zlatko Manojlović, Beograd, Divlji Anđeli and U Škripcu. He soon started to do arrangements and play keyboards, guitars and cello on the albums he produced.

Habić composed film scores for several Serbian films, including Stole Janković's Moment, Žika Mitrović's Protestni album (Protest Album), Srđan Dragojević's Pretty Village, Pretty Flame (for which he won the Best Original Score Award on film festival in Barcelona) and The Wounds, and others.

== Selected discography ==
=== Production ===
- Piloti – Dvadeset godina (1982)
- Divlji Anđeli – Divlji Anđeli (1982)
- U Škripcu – Godine ljubavi (1982)
- U Škripcu – O je! (1983)
- U Škripcu – Nove godine!
- Beograd – Remek depo (1983)
- Dorian Gray – Sjaj u tami (1983)
- Laki Pingvini – Šizika (1983)
- Bebi Dol – Ruže i krv (1983)
- Željko Bebek – Mene tjera neki vrag (1984)
- Luna – Nestvarne stvari (1984)
- Laza Ristovski – Roses for a General (1984)
- Slomljena Stakla – Ljubav je kad... (1984)
- U Škripcu – Budimo zajedno (1984)
- Jakarta – Maske za dvoje (1984)
- Bajaga i Instruktori – Sa druge strane jastuka (1985)
- YU Rock Misija – "Za milion godina" (1985)
- Zana – Zana (1985)
- Kornelije Kovač – Sampled Moonlight (1986)
- Bajaga i Instruktori – Jahači magle (1986)
- Jakarta – Bomba u grudima (1986)
- Alisa – Da li si čula pesmu umornih slavuja (1987)
- Dejan Cukić – Spori ritam (1987)
- Oktobar 1864 – Oktobar 1864 (1987)
- Rambo Amadeus – O tugo jesenja (1988)
- Alisa – Hiljadu tona ljubavi (1988)
- Bajaga i Instruktori – Prodavnica tajni (1988)
- YU Grupa – Ima nade (1988)
- Bajaga i Instruktori – Neka svemir čuje nemir (1989)
- Rambo Amadeus – Hoćemo gusle (1989)
- Dejan Cukić & Spori Ritam Band – Zajedno (1989)
- Galija – Korak do slobode (1989)
- Nikola Čuturilo – Raskršće (1989)
- Galija – Još uvek sanjam (1990)
- Riblja Čorba – Koza nostra (1990)
- Kerber – Peta strana sveta (1990)
- YU Grupa – Tragovi (1990)
- Bajaga i Instruktori – Četiri godišnja doba (1991)
- Vampiri – Rama-Lama-Ding-Dong (1991)
- Čutura & Oblaci – Rekom ljubavi (1991)
- Ruž – Čuvari ljubavi (1992)
- Regina – Ti si grob (1992)
- Dejan Cukić – San na pola puta (1992)
- Van Gogh – Strast (1993)
- Generacija 5 – Generacija 5 78–94 (1994)
- Galija – Karavan (1994)
- Van Gogh – Hodi (1996)
- Vampiri – Monkey Food (1997)
- Smak – Egregor (1999)
- Van Gogh – Opasan ples (1999)
- Zdravko Čolić – Okano (2000)
- Bajaga i Instruktori – Zmaj od Noćaja (2001)
- Dragoljub Đuričić & The Drums Company – Ritam slobode (2001)
- Van Gogh – DrUnder (2002)
- Zdravko Čolić – Čarolija (2003)
- Cactus Jack – Mainscream (2005)
- YU Grupa – Dugo znamo se (2005)
- Generacija 5 – Energija (2006)
- Rambo Amadeus – Hipishizik Metafizik (2008)
