= Ruka pravde =

Studio album by Kraljevski Apartman
- Released: 2004
- Recorded: Studio 5, PGP RTS, Belgrade, 2004
- Genres: Hard rock Heavy metal
- Length: 42:25
- Label: PGP RTS
- Producer: Miki Todorović

Kraljevski Apartman chronology
Rocker (2002)	Ruka pravde (2004)	Best Of Live (1996 - 2005) (2005)

Professional ratings
Review scores
Source	Rating
Serbian-metal.org	(favorable) link

Ruka pravde (trans. The Hand of Justice) is the fourth studio album by Serbian heavy metal band Kraljevski Apartman. The same lineup from the previous album, remained for this release as well. Featuring even more melodic style than the band's previous releases, the album was widely regarded as one of the band's finest works, by both fans and critics alike.

Promotional video was recorded for the title track and was broadcast on national and some international channels. "Ruka pravde" became the hit of 2004 on the Belgrade 202 radio show Hit of the week, and also the most recognizable song of the band.

== Track listing ==
All songs were written by Zoran Zdravković.

1. "Ruka pravde" - 5:37
2. "Dao sam sve od sebe" - 3:55
3. "Ona vedri i oblači" - 3:20
4. "Izaberi jedan put" - 3:41
5. "Sve u svoje vreme" - 4:06
6. "Sve su noći iste" - 4:02
7. "Začaran krug" - 4:31
8. "Vidim i kad zažmurim" - 5:01
9. "Posle sedam godina" - 4:06
10. "Pogledaj na sat" - 4:10

== Personnel ==
- Zoran Lalović - vocals
- Zoran Zdravković - guitar
- Zoran Rončević - drums
- Marko Nikolić - bass
- Dejan Đorđević - keyboards
