= Zana Nimani =

Serbian retired singer-songwriter

Zana Nimani Зана Нимани
- Also known as: Zana Šiškin
- Born: September 1961 (age 64–65); Belgrade, PR Serbia, FPR Yugoslavia
- Genres: New wave; synth-pop; pop rock
- Occupations: Singer; lyricist
- Instrument: Vocals
- Years active: 1976–1988
- Labels: Jugoton; PGP-RTB
- Formerly of: Zana
- Spouse: Đorđe Šiškin

Zana Šiškin (Serbian Cyrillic: Зана Шишкин; born in September 1961), best known under her maiden surname Zana Nimani (Serbian Cyrillic: Зана Нимани), is a Serbian and Yugoslav retired singer and lyricist of Albanian origin, best known as the first frontress of the pop rock band Zana. She recorded three albums with the band—Loše vesti uz rege za pivsku flašu (1981), Dodirni mi kolena (1982) and Natrag na voz (1983)—and one solo album, Noćas pevam samo tebi (1986), before retiring in late 1980s.

== Career ==
=== 1976–1984: Years with Zana ===
Nimani started her career in 1976, when she started to sing with the band Suton, in which her boyfriend-at-the-time Radovan Jovićević played guitar. Since 1979, the band started to perform under the name Zana, adopted after Nimani's first name. The band's first 7-inch singles and their debut album Loše vesti uz rege za pivsku flašu (Bad News Accompanied by Reggae for a Beer Bottle), released in 1981, brought them nationwide popularity. The following two albums, Dodirni mi kolena (Touch My Knees), released in 1982, and Natrag na voz (Back to the Train), released in 1983, were also well received, bringing a number of hits for the band. However, when Zana went on a hiatus in 1984 due to mandatory army stints of Jovićević and keyboardist Zoran Živanović, Nimani decided to leave the band (which would continue to work under the name Zana) and start a solo career.

=== 1984–1988: Solo career ===
In 1984, Nimani appeared as guest vocalist on Divlji Anđeli maxi single Totalni kontakt (Total Contact). In 1986, she released her only solo album, Noćas pevam samo tebi (Tonight I Sing Only for You). The album was recorded in Sweden and featured Swedish studio musicians. It was produced by Tini Varga, who also authored part of the songs. Other authors on the album were Nimani herself and former Zana members Marina Tucaković, Aleksandar "Futa" Radulović and Bogdan Dragović. The album brought minor hits "Što ne znam gde si sad" ("Why Don't I Know Where You Are Now") and "Miško zna" ("Miško Knows"). During the same year, Nimani appeared at the MESAM Festival with the song "Ruža na dlanu" ("Rose on the Palm"), which was released on the festival official compilation Mesam – Pop festival 86., and on a split 7-inch single with Bebi Dol's song "Inšalah" ("Inshallah").

In 1987, she recorded backing vocals for the album Into the Heart by blues guitarist Dragoljub Crnčević. In 1988, she appeared in the TV rock operette Kreatori i kreature (Creators and Creatures). The operette was composed by Vladimir Milačić, directed by Milutin Petrović and featured, beside Nimani, Massimo Savić, Dejan Cukić, Snežana Jandrlić, Bora Đorđević, Goran Čavajda "Čavke", Amila Sulejmanović and Đorđe Dragojlović. In 1988, she also wrote lyrics for the song "Priđi bliže" ("Come Closer") recorded by Mladen Vojičić "Tifa" on his first solo album No. 1.

=== Retirement from singing ===
Soon after, she got married and retired from the scene. In 2009, City Records released The Platinum Collection, a compilation of songs recorded by Nimani, both during her tenure as Zana's lead vocalist and during her solo career. In 2018, Croatia Records released the box set Original Album Collection, containing all four of Nimani's studio albums—Zana's first three with her as vocalist and her solo album Noćas pevam samo tebi.

== Personal life ==
Nimani was born in 1961 in Belgrade, to Kosovo Albanian parents from the town of Gjakova. Her mother was the first Albanian TV anchor in Kosovo, Antigona Nimani, and her father was a federal minister of state reserves. She graduated law.

She is married to Đorđe Šiškin. Nimani and Šiškin have one child, daughter Tea (born in Belgrade in 1991). With the breakup of Yugoslavia, she moved first to Sweden where she married and then to Canada, where she still resides.

== Discography ==
=== With Zana ===
==== Studio albums ====
- Loše vesti uz rege za pivsku flašu (1981)
- Dodirni mi kolena (1982)
- Natrag na voz (1983)

==== Singles ====
- "Nastavnice" / "Sveta" (1980)
- "Moj deda" / "Pepito pantalone" (1981)
- "Leto" / "Snovi od slame" (1981)
- "On" / "Ti si neko staro lice" (1981)
- "Jabuke i vino" (1983)

=== Solo ===
==== Studio albums ====
- Noćas pevam samo tebi (1986)

==== Singles ====
- "Što ne znam gde si sad" / "Eto, to si ti"
- "Ruža na dlanu" (1986)

==== Compilation albums ====
- The Platinum Collection (2009)
- Original Album Collection (2018)

=== Songwriting credits ===
List of songs with lyrics written by Nimani, showing year released and album name
Title	Year	Artist(s)	Album
"Via Amerika"	1982	Zana	Dodirni mi kolena
"Probudi me"	1983	Zana	Natrag na voz
"Osećam i znam"	1983	Zana	Natrag na voz
"Noćas pevam samo tebi"	1986	Zana Nimani	Noćas pevam samo tebi
"Sanjam (Dok kiše lutaju)"	1986	Zana Nimani	Noćas pevam samo tebi
"Priđi bliže"	1989	Mladen Vojičić Tifa	No.1
