= Grad (EP) =

EP by Cactus Jack
- Released: November 2002
- Recorded: Studio Cyber Sound Production; Studio Avala Film Music Factory
- Genre: Hard rock
- Label: One Records
- Producer: Zoran Maletić

Cactus Jack chronology
| DisCover (2002) | Grad (2002) | Deep Purple Tribute (2003) |

Professional ratings
Review scores
| Source | Rating |
|---|---|
| Rock Express | 8/10 stars |

Grad (trans. The City) is an EP released by Serbian rock band Cactus Jack in 2002.

Grad is the band's second release, following their 2002 debut release, the live/cover album DisCover, and is the band's first release to feature their own material. Besides three tracks, the EP features the video for the track "Nekada" ("Some Time Ago") as a bonus.

The EP cover was designed by Dragoljub "Paja" Bogdanović, who appeared on the band's previous release as guest vocalist and would in 2015 become Cactus Jack's frontman.

== Track listing ==
All songs written by Stevan Birak and Miodrag Krudulj.

| No. | Title | Length |
|---|---|---|
| 1. | "Grad" ("The City") | 4:59 |
| 2. | "Godine za plakanje" ("Crying Years") | 3:57 |
| 3. | "Nekada" ("Some Time Ago") | 3:58 |

=== Bonus video ===
| No. | Title | Length |
|---|---|---|
| 4. | "Nekada" | 3:58 |

== Personnel ==
- Vladimir Jezdimirović - vocals
- Stevan Birak - guitar
- Miodrag Krudulj - bass guitar
- Dušan Gnjidić - drums
- Zoran Samuilov - keyboard

=== Additional personnel ===
- Zoran Maletić - producer, arrangements, recorded by
- Aleksandra Stojanović - recorded by
- Dragoljub "Paja" Bogdanović - cover design
