= DrUnder =

Studio album by Van Gogh
- Released: 2002
- Genre: Rock; Electronic rock
- Length: 41:54
- Label: Hi-Fi Centar

Van Gogh chronology
Happy New Ear (2001)	DrUnder (2002)	Kolo (2006)

DrUnder is the sixth studio album from Serbian rock band Van Gogh, released in 2002.

== Track listing ==
1. "DrUnder" – 4:36
2. "Bulldog" – 3:06
3. "Za godine tvoje" – 4:06
4. "Tanka nit" – 3:37
5. "Pupak" – 3:12
6. "Klupko" – 3:38
7. "Šta ako" – 4:17
8. "Mia Donna" – 3:54
9. "Niko ne sme..." – 4:08
10. "YoYo" – 3:19
11. "Sve što bih da znam" – 4:01

== Personnel ==
- Zvonimir Đukić - guitar, vocals
- Dragan Ivanović - bass guitar
- Srboljub Radivojević - drums
