= Oktobar 1864 =

Yugoslav rock band (1984–1992)

Background information
- Origin: Belgrade, SR Serbia, SFR Yugoslavia
- Genres: Funk rock; jazz pop; blue-eyed soul
- Years active: 1984–1992
- Labels: Jugodisk, PGP-RTB, City Records
- Spinoffs: Braća Left
- Past members: Goran Tomanović; Tanja Jovićević; Željko Mitrović; Ivan Zečević; Dean Krmpotić; Marko Lalić; Branko Baćović; Nebojša Mrvaljević; Dejan Abadić; Vuk Dinić; Ljubinko Tomanović; Slobodan Andrić; Deže Molnar; Srđan Jovanović

Oktobar 1864 (Serbian Cyrillic: Октобар 1864; trans. October 1864) was a Yugoslav rock band formed in Belgrade in 1984.

Formed and led by guitarist Goran Tomanović and fronted by vocalist Tanja Jovićević, the band gained mainstream popularity in Yugoslavia in mid-1980s with their funk rock and jazz pop sound. During their activity, the band released three studio albums with a number of hit songs. Despite commercial success and critical acclaim, due to the outbreak of the Yugoslav Wars, the band members decided to end their activity in 1992.

== Biography ==
=== 1984–1992 ===
Oktobar 1864 was formed in 1984 by guitarist Goran Tomanović, who looked for first band members over the newspaper ads. In the initial phase, Oktobar 1864 was a five-member group performing classic rock and going through frequent lineup changes. The band had their first notable performance in Taš club in Belgrade at the beginning of 1985, performing with vocalist Tanja Jovićević. Prior to joining Oktobar 1864, Jovićević performed with a little-known rhythm and blues band from Zemun and performed jazz standards in Belgrade clubs. In 1985, Oktobar 1864, alongside 102 other bands from all parts of Yugoslavia, performed at the battle of the bands festival which was a part of Palilulska olimpijada kulture (Palilula Olympics of Culture), winning first place. The band also won the Best Demo Band Award at the MESAM festival. With their first successes, the band got a steady lineup, featuring Goran Tomanović (guitar), Tanja Jovićević (vocals), Željko Mitrović (bass guitar), Ivan Zečević (drums), Dean Krmpotić (keyboards), Marko Lalić (saxophone), Branko Baćović (trumpet) and Nebojša Mrvaljević (trombone).

In 1987, the band released their debut self-titled album. The album was produced by Saša Habić and released via Jugodisk record label. It featured guest appearances by Jovan Maljoković on saxophone, Zoran Lazarević on bass guitar, Bojan Zulfikarpašić—who also co-authored the song "Morning" ("Jutro")—on keyboards, and former S Vremena Na Vreme members Ljuba Ninković and Asim Sarvan on backing vocals. The album brought the jazz pop hits "Carte Blanche" and "Pomisli" ("Think"), as well as "Nađi me" ("Find Me"), which was the band's version of Yugoslav jazz singer Nada Knežević's cover of the Four Tops' "Reach Out I'll Be There".

The band's second album Igra bojama (Play with Colors), released in 1988 through PGP-RTB label, was recorded in a new line-up, with Dejan Abadić on keyboards and Vuk Dinić on trombone. The album was produced by Rex Ilusivii and Theodore Yanni, and featured guest appearances by saxophonists Deže Molnar and Josip Kovač, and by Milan Mladenović (of Ekatarina Velika) and Nera (formerly of Aska) on backing vocals. The album brought sophisticated white soul hits "Sam" ("Alone"), "Pratiš trag" ("You're Following the Trace") and "Želim te" ("I Want You"). At the end of the year, readers of Yugoslav music magazine Pop Rock polled the band the Biggest Hope of the Year, Jovićević was polled the Female Vocalist of the Year, and Igra bojama album cover, designed by comic book artist Zoran Janjetov, was polled the Album Cover of the Year.

During 1989, the band held numerous performances across Yugoslavia, often holding joint concerts with Ekatarina Velika, held a sold-out concert in Belgrade Youth Center and performed in Oberhausen and Berlin. During the year, the band was joined by two new members, Goran Tomanović's cousin Ljubinko "Ljuba" Tomanović (bass guitar) and Slobodan Andrić (saxophone), and the group opened the new stage of Belgrade's Bitef Theatre with their performance. At the end of the year, Jovićević was once again polled the Female Vocalist of the Year by the readers of Pop Rock.

In March 1990, Oktobar 1864 recorded their third album Crni ples (Black Dance) in Titograd. The album was produced by Theodore Yanni and the band members, and featured guest appearances by Deže Molnar on tenor and alto saxophone and keyboards, Dragan Kozarčić on trumpet, Anton Horvat on baritone saxophone, Milan Mladenović on backing vocals, Blagoje Nedeljković of the band Rock Street on drums (in "Denis") and Ted Yanni on guitar (solo in "Crni ples"). The cover was once again designed by Zoran Janjetov. The album brought the hits "Crni ples", "Miris predgrađa" ("Smell of the Suburbs"), "Denis" and "Put" ("Road"). On the follow-up tour, they were joined by new members, Deže Molnar (saxophone) and Srđan Jovanović (drums). During the year, the band wrote and recorded music for Darko Bajić's feature film Početni udarac (Kick Off) and for Šahin Šišić's documentary film Izlazak u javnost (Coming Out) about Zagreb comic book artist Emir Mešić.

Despite large popularity and praises coming from Yugoslav music critics, due to the outbreak of the Yugoslav Wars, the band members decided to end their activity. They held their farewell concert in Students' Cultural Center in Belgrade in January 1992. During the band's last tour, a documentary about them was filmed by TV Sarajevo. The film, entitled Oktobar 1864, was broadcast only once, in 1992, and was subsequently lost during the Bosnian War.

=== Post breakup ===
After Oktobar 1864 disbanded, Goran and Ljubinko Tomanović formed the alternative rock band Braća Left with two former members of the band Armagedon, Miodrag Šuša (guitar, vocals) and Goran Milanović (drums). They released two studio albums, Braća Left 1 (1994) and Braća Left 2 (1996). Tanja Jovićević made a guest appearance on the latter, in the song "Anđeo" ("Angel"). After Braća Left disbanded, Tomanović started the band Manú.

Tanja Jovićević pursued solo career as a jazz singer, often appearing on albums by other artists. In 1990, on a festival in Ulm, she held a performance entitled Anđeoski prah (Angel Dust) with Ekatarina Velika frontman Milan Mladenović. She toured with Ekatarina Velika and Bajaga i Instruktori as guest. She sang in the theatre play Look Homeward, Angel directed by Balša Đogo. In the 2000s, she returned to performing rock with her backing bands Oktobar and Happy Family. She provided vocals for the album 10 (2010) by the band Richbitch, performing for some time with them. With pianist Vlada Maričić, she recorded the album Magija koja ne prestaje (Magic That Doesn't Stop), featuring, alongside Maričić's compositions, covers of Oktobar 1864 songs "Carte Blanche" and "Želim te".

Željko Mitrović performed for a time with the comedy band Rokeri s Moravu. He founded Pink TV station and City Records label, Goran Tomanović working as an editor for the latter.

In 2006, PGP-RTB successor PGP-RTS reissued Igra bojama and Crni ples on CD.

== Legacy ==
The band's version of "Nađi me" was covered in 2004 by Serbian rock and pop singer Ana Stanić on her album U ogledalu (In the Mirror), with Jovićević making a guest appearance on backing vocals.

In 2011, the song "Crni ples" was polled, by the listeners of Radio 202, one of 60 greatest songs released by PGP-RTB/PGP-RTS during the sixty years of the label's existence.

== Discography ==
=== Studio albums ===
- Oktobar 1864 (1987)
- Igra bojama (1988)
- Crni ples (1990)

=== Compilation albums ===
- Najbolje (1997)
- Ultimate Collection (2011)
