= Tanja Jovićević =

- Born: 1967; Belgrade, SR Serbia, SFR Yugoslavia
- Genres: Rock; funk rock; jazz pop; blue-eyed soul; jazz
- Occupation: Singer
- Instrument: Vocals
- Years active: 1985–present
- Labels: Jugodisk; PGP-RTB; City Records
- Formerly of: Oktobar 1864

Tanja Jovićević (Serbian Cyrillic: Тања Јовићевић; born 1967) is a Serbian and Yugoslav singer, best known as the former frontress of the rock band Oktobar 1864.

== Biography ==
=== Early career ===
Prior to joining Oktobar 1864, Jovićević performed with a little-known rhythm and blues band from Zemun and performed jazz standards in Belgrade clubs.

=== Oktobar 1864 (1985–1992) ===
Jovićević started performing with Oktobar 1864 at the beginning of 1985. The band gained large mainstream popularity in Yugoslavia with their funk rock sound. The group scored a number of hit songs, and Jovićević was during its activity polled the Female Vocalist of the Year by the readers of the Yugoslav music magazine Pop Rock on two occasions, in 1988 and 1989. The band released three studio albums, before, in 1992, they decided to end their activity due to the outbreak of Yugoslav Wars.

=== Post-Oktobar 1864 (1992–present) ===
After Oktobar 1964 disbanded, Jovićević pursued solo career as a jazz singer. In 1990, on a festival in Ulm, she held a performance entitled Anđeoski prah (Angel Dust) with Ekatarina Velika frontman Milan Mladenović. She toured with Ekatarina Velika and Bajaga i Instruktori as guest. She sang in the theatre play Look Homeward, Angel directed by Balša Đogo.

In the 2000s, she returned to performing rock with her backing bands Oktobar and Happy Family. She provided vocals for the album 10 (2010) by the band Richbitch, performing for some time with them. With pianist Vlada Maričić, she recorded the album Magija koja ne prestaje (Magic That Doesn't Stop), featuring, alongside Maričić's compositions, covers of Oktobar 1864 songs "Carte Blanche" and "Želim te" ("I Want You").

=== Guest appearances ===
Jovićević appeared on vocals and backing vocals on albums by Ekatarina Velika, Milorad Mandić, Bajaga i Instruktori, Braća Left, Love Hunters, Ana Stanić, Zona B and other artists.

== Discography ==
=== With Oktobar 1864 ===
==== Studio albums ====
- Oktobar 1864 (1987)
- Igra bojama (1988)
- Crni ples (1990)

==== Compilation albums ====
- Najbolje (1997)
- Ultimate Collection (2011)

=== With Richbitch ===
==== Studio albums ====
- 10 (2009)

=== Solo ===
==== Studio albums ====
- Magija koja ne prestaje (With Vlada Maričić; 2016)
