= Happy New Ear =

Live album by Van Gogh
- Released: February 2001
- Recorded: December 24, 1999
- Venue: Sports Hall, Belgrade
- Genre: Rock
- Label: Metropolis Records
- Producer: Vlada Negovanović

Van Gogh chronology
'Opasan ples' (1995)	Happy New Ear (2001)	'DrUnder' (2002)

Happy New Ear is the second live album by Serbian rock band Van Gogh released in 2001. The album was recorded on the band's concert held December 24, 1999, in Sports Hall in Belgrade, which was a part of the Happy New Ear Tour.

== Track listing ==
1. "New Ear Kid" - 0:33
2. "Bez oblika" - 4:19
3. "Puls" - 4:37
4. "Extaza" - 3:54
5. "Manitu" - 4:41
6. "Demagogija - 3:57
7. "Zamisli" - 6:09
8. "Teška ljubav" - 4:20
9. "Pleme" - 3:38
10. "Basna" - 4:17
11. "Brod od papira" - 4:43
12. "Opasan ples" - 5:40
13. "Teška ljubav" (Video)

== Personnel ==
- Zvonimir Đukić - guitar, vocals
- Dušan Bogunović - bass guitar
- Srboljub Radivojević - drums
