= Opasan ples =

Studio album by Van Gogh
- Released: 1999
- Recorded: Studio O November 1998
- Genre: Rock
- Length: 47:58
- Label: Metropolis Records
- Producer: Saša Habić

Van Gogh chronology
No Comment (1997)	Opasan ples (1999)	Happy New Ear (2001)

Opasan ples (trans. Dangerous Dance) is the fifth studio album from a Serbian rock band Van Gogh.

== Track listing ==
1. "Puls" (S. Habić, S. Radivojević, Z. Đukić) – 4:08
2. "Da li zna?" (Z. Đukić) – 3:22
3. "Demagogija" (S. Radivojević Z. Đukić) – 3:08
4. "Pleme" (S. Habić, S. Radivojević, D. Maksimović) – 3:18
5. "Bez oblika" (Z. Đukić) – 3:51
6. "Opasan ples" (S. Habić, Z. Đukić) – 3:51
7. "Brod od papira" (Z. Đukić) – 3:22
8. "Teška ljubav" (Z. Đukić) – 4:28
9. "Otisak dlana" (S. Habić, Z. Đukić) – 4:04
10. "Zauvek" (S. Habić, Z. Đukić) – 3:53

== Personnel ==
- Zvonimir Đukić - vocals, guitar, mandolin, backing vocals
- Srboljub Radivojević - drums, backing vocals

=== Additional personnel ===
- Ryan Nemuryn - bass guitar
- Nenad Stefanović - bass guitar
- Dušan Bogović - bass guitar
- Saša Habić - keyboards, percussion, producer
