= Rocker (album) =

Studio album by Kraljevski Apartman
- Released: 2002
- Recorded: Studio Fokus, Banjica, July / August, 2002
- Genres: Hard rock, heavy metal
- Length: 46:40
- Label: Rock Express
- Producer: Aleksandar Toković

Kraljevski Apartman chronology
Izgubljen u vremenu (2000)	Rocker (2002)	Ruka pravde (2004)

Professional ratings
Review scores
Source	Rating
Serbian-metal.org	(favorable)

Rocker is the third studio album by Serbian heavy metal band Kraljevski Apartman. For the first time in the band's history, an official keyboard player was brought in substituting the second guitar. The band presented a heavy but at the same time a melodic approach to their music with heavy-riff songs and power ballads. The band recorded eleven new songs plus one bonus track from Labyrinth movie soundtrack. The album featured ballad "Dama iz kraljevskog apartmana" which became their stamp for the future, "Ranjena zver" (for which the band recorded a promotional video), glam metal-oriented "Vino, viski i Rock 'n' Roll" and "Za ljubav ne treba da moliš" which became classics and considered unskippable on live appearances. The track "Niemansland" was written in German language and Zdravković provided the vocals. This is the first Kraljevski Apartman track on foreign language and not sung by Lalović.

== Track listing ==
All songs were written by Zoran Zdravković except where noted.

1. "Ranjena zver" - 4:06
2. "Ne traži milost" - 5:32
3. "Rocker" - 2:24
4. "Znam da život kratko traje" - 3:57
5. "Dama iz kraljevskog apartmana" - 3:56
6. "Za ljubav ne treba da moliš" - 5:54
7. "Nije sve crno" - 3:11
8. "Neću da stanem na pola puta" - 4:11
9. "Vino, viski i Rock 'n' Roll" - 3:43
10. "Niemandsland" (R. Schreiner, Z. Zdravković) - 2:39
11. "Crni konjanici" (M. Milatović, Z. Zdravković) - 2:55

=== Bonus tracks ===
1. "U lavirintu sedam greha" (Bonus track from the Labyrinth movie soundtrack) - 4:12

== Personnel ==
- Zoran Lalović - vocals
- Zoran Zdravković - guitar
- Zoran Rončević - drums
- Marko Nikolić - bass
- Dejan Đorđević - keyboards
