= Cactus Jack (band) =

Serbian band

- Origin: Pančevo, Serbia
- Genres: Rock; hard rock
- Years active: 1998–present
- Labels: One Records, PGP-RTS
- Members: Stevan Birak; Miodrag Krudulj; Dragoljub Bogdanović; Dragan Živković; Zoran Samuilov
- Past members: Vladimir Jezdimirović; Dušan Gnjidić; Bojana Racić; Mladen Gošić

Cactus Jack is a Serbian rock band formed in Pančevo in 1998.

Led by guitarist Stevan Birak and fronted by vocalist Vladimir Jezdimirović, the group started as a cover band. Cactus Jack's debut release was the live cover album DisCover (2002), followed by the live tribute album Deep Purple Tribute (2003). The band presented themselves with traditional hard rock sound, the releases bringing them attention of the audience and the media. The band released their first album of their own songs, entitled Natur all, in 2004, followed by the album Mainscream (2005). In the years following the release of their second studio album, the band failed to maintain mainstream popularity and returned to club performances with female vocalist Bojana Racić, including a number of funk and pop rock covers into their repertoire. In mid-2010s the band returned to hard rock sound with new vocalist, Dragoljub "Paja" Bogdanović.

== Band history ==
The band, originally named Caramba, was formed at the end of 1998 by Stevan Birak (guitar), Vladimir Jezdimirović (vocals), Miodrag Krudulj (bass guitar) and Dušan Gnjidić (a former Kontrabanda member, drums). Initially, the band performed mostly soundtracks from Quentin Tarantino's movies, and later started performing mostly covers of songs by international hard rock acts. In 1999 they adopted the name Cactus Jack, choosing it after the UK and Australia release name of the 1979 film The Villain.

In February 2002 the band released their debut album, a live cover release DisCover, which was recorded on their concert held on 23 December 2001 in Coupe club in Pančevo, and featured cover of songs by various rock artists. The album featured Cactus Jack's future vocalist Dragoljub "Paja" Bogdanović, at the time member of the band Beer Drinkers & Hell Raisers, as guest vocalist on two tracks. During 2002 they performed on Riblja Čorba tour as the opening band. Later during the year they released the EP Grad (The City), their first release to feature their own songs. The EP featured three songs, "Grad", "Godine za plakanje" ("Crying Years") and "Nekada" ("Some Time Ago"), and a video for the song "Nekada". In May 2003 they released the double live album Deep Purple Tribute, recorded in Coupe club on 22 November 2002 and featuring covers of Deep Purple songs. The album featured a new member, keyboardist Zoran Samuilov, while Vladimir Janković "Džet" and Dragoljub "Paja" Bogdanović appeared on the album as guest vocalists. On 7 December 2003 they performed as the opening band on Deep Purple concert in Belgrade Fair – Hall 1.

In 2004 the band released their first full-length studio album, Natur all. The album was produced by Zoran Maletić and, besides the band's own songs, featured a Serbian language cover of U2 song "Hold Me, Thrill Me, Kiss Me, Kill Me", entitled "Model donjeg veša" ("Lingerie Model"), and a cover of Led Zeppelin song "Kashmir". In October 2005 the band released their second studio album, Mainscream, on which they made a slight shift from their traditional hard rock style towards more melodic hard rock sound. The album was produced by Saša Habić. It featured the song "Glumica" ("Actress"), for which the lyrics were written by singer Bebi Dol.

In the early 2010s, Jezdimirović left the band. He was replaced by female vocalist Bojana Racić, with whom the band returned to club performances, including a number of pop rock and funk songs into their repertoire. With Racić, the band recorded covers of several pop songs, which, although available on Stevan Birak's official YouTube channel, were never officially released. The band celebrated their 15th anniversary on 21 December 2013, with a concert in Pančevo Cultural Centre. The concert featured Jezdimirović as guest.

In April 2015, the band announced new activities in the new lineup, featuring Stevan Birak (guitar), Miodrag Krudulj (bass guitar), former Beer Drinkers / Hell Raisers and Stereo Tip member and the band's old associate Dragoljub "Paja" Bogdanović (vocals), Karizma member Dragan Živković "Pizzi" (drums) and Alogia member Mladen Gošić (keyboards). The band announced the recording of a new studio album. In July 2017 the band released the first single from the upcoming album, entitled "Jin i Jang" ("Yin and Yang"), through Metropolis Records.

== Discography ==
=== Studio albums ===
- Natur all (2004)
- Mainscream (2005)

=== EPs ===
- Grad (2002)

=== Live albums ===
- DisCover (2002)
- Deep Purple Tribute (2003)
