= Izgubljen u vremenu =

Studio album by Kraljevski Apartman
- Released: 2000
- Recorded: Studio Berar, Novi Sad / Studio Kazablanka, Belgrade, 2000
- Genres: Hard rock Heavy metal
- Length: 52:44
- Label: Rock Express Records
- Producer: Dadi Stojanović

Kraljevski Apartman chronology
Long Live Rock 'n' Roll (1997)	Izgubljen u vremenu (2000)	Rocker (2002)

Professional ratings
Review scores
Source	Rating
Serbian-metal.org	(favorable)

Izgubljen u vremenu (trans. "Lost In Time") is the second studio album by Serbian heavy metal band Kraljevski Apartman. Following the release of their first album Long Live Rock 'n' Roll and good reactions of the fans and critics, the band, with a changed lineup, entered the studio to record the second studio album. The album featured a cover of Uriah Heep's "Lady in Black" entitled "Slike". Promotional video was recorded for the track "Posle oluje (javi se...)". The album featured four tracks from the Long Live Rock 'n' Roll as bonus tracks.

== Track listing ==
All songs were written by Zoran Zdravković except where noted.

1. "Izgubljen u vremenu" - 4:01
2. "Slomljeno srce" - 4:18
3. "Nikad se ne predajem" - 4:28
4. "Znak zveri" (M. Milatović, Z. Zdravković) - 3:44
5. "Jesen" - 4:00
6. "Ne traži đavola" - 3:36
7. "Posle oluje (javi se...)" - 4:44
8. "Slike" (K. Hensley, Z. Zdravković) - 4:40

=== Bonus tracks ===
9. "Ne verujem u lažne anđele" - 6:05
10. "Misterija" - 4:54
11. "Mračan grad" - 4:28
12. "Long Live Rock 'n' Roll" (R. Blackmore, Z. Zdravković) - 3:43

== Personnel ==
- Zoran Lalović - vocals
- Zoran Zdravković - guitar
- Miroslav Šen - guitar
- Duždević Srđan - drums
- Čačija Igor - bass guitar
