= Discover (album) =

DisCover

Live album by Cactus Jack
- Released: February 2002
- Recorded: Coupe club, Pančevo; 23 December 2001
- Genre: Rock; hard rock
- Length: 88:06
- Label: One Records
- Producer: Cactus Jack; Moma Cvetković

Cactus Jack chronology
DisCover (2002)	Grad (2002)

Discover, stylized as DisCover on the cover, is the debut album by Serbian rock band Cactus Jack.

The album was recorded on the band's concert held on 23 December 2001 in the Coupe club in their hometown Pančevo. It features 19 covers of songs by various rock acts. The album features two bonus tracks, "Hard to Handle" and "Tush", with Dragoljub "Paja" Bogdanović as guest vocalist. Bogdanović, who would in 2015 become Cactus Jack's frontman, was at the time member of the band Beer Drinkers & Hell Raisers.

== Track listing ==
No.	Title	Original artist	Length
1.	"Message in a Bottle"	Police	4:15
2.	"Tube Snake Boogie"	ZZ Top	4:07
3.	"Somebody to Love"	Jefferson Airplane, cover of the Jim Carrey version from The Cable Guy: Original Motion Picture Soundtrack	3:27
4.	"My Sharona / Gimme Some Lovin'"	The Knack / Spencer Davis Group	7:12
5.	"Hold Me, Thrill Me, Kiss Me, Kill Me"	U2	4:16
6.	"Stuck in the Middle with You"	Stealers Wheel	3:28
7.	"Are You Gonna Go My Way"	Lenny Kravitz	4:19
8.	"All Day and All of the Night / You Really Got Me"	The Kinks	4:01
9.	"Touch Too Much"	AC/DC	4:50
10.	"After Dark"	Tito & Tarantula	4:39
11.	"Long Live Rock 'n' Roll"	Rainbow	3:50
12.	"Your Mama Don't Dance"	Loggins and Messina	4:32
13.	"Wine, Women an' Song"	Whitesnake	4:23
14.	"Rock and Roll"	Led Zeppelin	3:29
15.	"I Was Made for Lovin' You"	Kiss	5:44
16.	"Long Train Runnin' / Babe I'm Gonna Leave You"	The Doobie Brothers / Led Zeppelin	10:02
17.	"She's Just Killing Me"	ZZ Top	4:21

=== Bonus tracks ===
No.	Title	Original artist	Length
18.	"Hard to Handle"	Otis Redding, cover of The Black Crowes version	4:21
19.	"Tush"	ZZ Top	2:31

== Personnel ==
- Vladimir Jezdimirović - vocals
- Stevan Birak - guitar
- Miodrag Krudulj - bass guitar
- Dušan Gnjidić - drums

=== Additional personnel ===
- Dragoljub "Paja" Bogdanović - vocals (on tracks: 18, 19)
- Moma Cvetković - producer
- Zoltan Totka - photography
