= Gates of Belgrade =

This article describes 23 gates of Belgrade.

== Roman gates ==
Remains of the southeastern gate of the Singidunum's castrum were found when adapting the building of the Belgrade Library, with one of its towers now being in the library depot and the other across the street in the small park with Milan Rakić's bust. The gate was located exactly at the end of Knez Mihailova and entrance of Kalemegdan park, at 44°49′12″N 20°27′12″E. Thus this entrance stayed at the same place for nearly 2,000 years.

Northwestern gate of the castrum was located roughly at the same place as today's Defterdar's Gate.

== Fortress gates ==
=== Upper city gates ===
These are gates in the walls of the Upper City of the Belgrade Fortress. Gates that are connected to each other are not exactly aligned. This was done to prevent use of siege engines on the inner gate, if the outer gate would be breached.

Name	Photograph	Built	Location	Description
Clock Gate-Baroque Gate complex	Clock Gate and Clock Tower	1688	44°49′23″N 20°27′2″E	Southeast gate in the innermost city wall, it is connected via a bridge to the Inner Stambol Gate. This section of the Upper Town's rampart, which was originally built during the reign of despot Stefan Lazarević as a wall without the gate, was completely transformed during the reconstructions and upgrades up to the 18th century. The complex includes two gates, Clock and Baroque (connected by the small, side room), the Clock Tower (Sahat kula) and two ramparts which cross all three objects - medieval one and the one constructed by the Venetian architect Andrea Cornaro, the so-called Cornaro's Wall, built in front of the old rampart in c. 1700. The gate is also sometimes referred to as the Cornaro's Gate. The original passage was built for the first time in 1688, after the Austrians conquered Belgrade from the Ottomans. After the Ottomans retook the fortress in 1690, they reconstructed this section of the ramparts and walled the gate. After the Austrians again conquered Belgrade, from 1717 to 1739, a massive Baroque reconstruction of both the fortress and the city began. A new, Baroque Gate, was dug through, next to the older, walled gate. This new position was better suited for the Austrian new design of the bastions along the southeast front of the artillery fortification (symmetric bastions and main gate in the center). New gate was built from brick and had semi-circular ceiling. After another takeover by the Ottomans, this gate was walled after 1740 and the Clock Gate became operational again. This is also when the clock tower was built above the gate, on the outer section of the rampart, giving the gate its name. It was the first clock tower in Belgrade, built from 1740 to 1789. It was characteristic for baroque architecture, mimicking religious objects from the same period. It is a mechanical clock, and the original hands are kept in the Institute for the Cultural Monuments Protection in Belgrade. In the late 19th century and the 1900s, along the rampart three auxiliary guard houses were constructed by the Serbian army. The Baroque Gate was revitalized in 1987 and in 1989 the gallery of the Belgrade Fortress moved in, which included three rooms, central gate passage and two auxiliary, side rooms. Restoration works were held in 2003, when it became obvious that a much serious reconstruction is needed. 2003 works unearthed evidence that the area was inhabited by humans in prehistory. The foundations of the medieval rampart were also discovered. The earthen mound which covered the rampart and the gates was removed to reduce moisturizing of the inside rooms. It was also expected to reclaim two side rooms which were thought to be collapsed, but it turned out they were actually never finished, even though the openings for the doors and windows are made on the gate's inner walls. A temporary, protective wooden eave was built above the entrance of the Clock Gate. The Baroque Gate deteriorated a lot nevertheless, so it was closed for the visitors. The temporary eave was removed in 2019. A complete renovation of both gates began in 2020, and was finished by December. The roof of both gates is adapted into the plateau from which the visitors can access the Clock Tower. Plateau is ornamented with glass lanterns and one section is adapted into the green roof. Protective roof slab was placed between two gates to protect the space which connects them. Remains of all, various reconstructions and adaptations are clearly visible on the gates. Despite the lightning rod on the tower, a lightning struck in late May 2021 damaged the clock mechanism (a modern one, introduced in 2002), and destroyed all wirings in the tower itself. The hands stopped at 15:15. They are also modern, as the original ones were removed, and are kept at the Institute for the Culture Monuments Protection. Due to the lack of proper experts, the clock remained out of order, until November 2021. The clock tower is 27.5 metres (90 ft) tall.
Defterdar's Gate	Defterdar's Gate		44°49′26″N 20°26′56″E	Northwestern gate in the innermost city wall, accessible only via a steep stairway. Entrance complex at the gate is partially preserved.
Despot's Gate (or Dizdar's Gate)	Despot's Gate	1404-1427	44°49′30″N 20°27′2″E	Northeastern gate in the innermost city wall, located right next to the Despot's Tower. It is connected via a bridge to the Zindan Gate. The gate is named after despot Stefan Lazarević. The gate and tower are the best preserved medieval part of the fortress and the only fortress gate preserved in its original appearance. The gate makes one architectural unit with the adjoining Dizdar's Tower. Also known as the Easter Upper Town Gate, it was the main entry gate into the fortress in the Middle Ages. As it was built in double ramparts, it had two parts, outer and inner ones. The inner gate had a defensive balcony, machicolation, with a niche below for the city defender saint's icon. The adjoining Dizdar's Tower is a massive, square based object. It was named after dizdars, the commanders of the fortress, who lived in it in the second half of the 18th century. The tower was damaged during the Austro-Hungarian bombing of Belgrade in 1915 during World War I. Partially reconstructed in 1938, today it hosts the observatory of the "Ruđer Bošković" astronomical society. The battlement of the tower, including the embrasures, was reconstructed in 1979. The gate itself was reconstructed in 2020, including works on outer facade, inner walls and stabilized statics of the object.
Inner Stambol Gate	Inner Stambol Gate	c. 1750	44°49′21″N 20°27′3″E	The main gate of the fortress. Southeastern gate in the second city wall, connected via a bridge to the Clock Gate, and via a land bridge to the outer ravelin, where the way forks towards Karadjordje's and Outer Stambol Gate. The gate is named after Istanbul.
Karađorđe's Gate	Karadjordje's Gate	18th century	44°49′18″N 20°27′3″E	Southern gate of its ravelin, built in the early 18th century. In the 19th century it was named after Karađorđe, cause it was erroneously thought that he passed through this gate during the liberation of Belgrade from the Ottomans in 1806. Karađorđe, however, entered via the main road and outer Stambol Gate. For the most part, the gate was walled, already in the late 18th century, and then again after 1813, only to be re-opened after World War II. It is accessible over the small bridge which is being regularly restored (1987, 2005, 2020).
King Gate	King Gate	c. 1725	44°49′22″N 20°26′52″E	Southwestern gate in the innermost city wall. The gate is descended to via a short stairway which passes next to the Roman Well. A bridge then connects it with the King Ravelin.
Leopold's Gate	Leopold's Gate	c. 1690	44°49′30″N 20°27′6″E	The outermost northeastern gate, connected via a bridge to the Zindan Gate. It was named after Leopold I.
Outer Stambol Gate	Outer Stambol Gate	1840-1860	44°49′20″N 20°27′7″E	Eastern gate of its ravelin, it is named after Istanbul.
Southern Gate	Southern (Baroque) Gate (on the right)	c. 1720s	44°49′23″N 20°27′2″E	Built in the 15th century, also called the Baroque Gate; it existed right next to the Clock Gate and was built shut when the later was opened. Today it is turned into a museum. See Clock Gate-Baroque Gate complex above.
Zindan Gate	Zindan Gate	c. 1450	44°49′33″N 20°27′5″E	The middle southeastern gate, in the Danube direction, between two round towers, it was built in the middle of the 15th century to enhance the defense of the Eastern Gate, which, at the time, was the main entrance into the city. It was built as an outpost, or barbican, made of two massive semi-round towers, with the passage between them. At the time, there was a moat in front of the gate, crossed by the drawbridge, while the space between the gate and the cornered tower of the Upper Town was closed with the 11 metres (36 ft) tall, arched bridge. Above the gate's arch there is a small, rectangle niche, with an alcove for the icon of the saint, protector of the city. On the towers, and arch wall which connects them, there are seven cannon openings. The 1456 Siege of Belgrade was the first recorded artillery defense (using fire arms) in the fortress, which helped to defend the city at the time. The gate was fully reconstructed during the Austrian occupation in the first half of the 18th century. The towers were roofed with bricks, while the protective arched wall was enhanced with the earthen embankment. Masoned staircases were built, with access corridors, for both towers. Since the 18th century, the Ottomans used towers' basement as dungeon, a zindan, hence the name of the gate. It is connected with bridges to the Despot's Gate on the inside and Leopold's Gate on the outside. The wooden bridge in front of the gate was reconstructed in 2005 and 2020. Massive reconstruction began in April 2022. Works also include moisture problems solving, revitalization of the walls and their statics, and reconstruction of the side rooms which will become usable again. Due to its unusual name and unique appearance within the fort's complex, it is one of the most distinct gates. The gate is referred in the song Ruža vetrova by the Bajaga i Instruktori.

=== Lower city gates ===
Name	Photograph	Built	Location	Description
Dark Gate	Dark Gate		44°49′19″N 20°26′49″E	The southern gate of the lower city. The gate and entire complex surrounding it saw extensive renovation in 2007 and 2008.
Gate of Charles VI (Gate of Karl VI)	Gate of Charles VI	1736	44°49′33″N 20°26′57″E	Built as triumphal arch of Charles VI, it is one of very few baroque buildings in Belgrade. It was built during the Nicolas Doxat's reconstruction of Belgrade under the orders of Prince Eugene of Savoy, in the early days of the Austrian occupation, from 1718 to 1720, though the modern plaque on the gate has year 1736 inscribed. It was designed by Balthasar Neumann in the style of German baroque, rather than Viennese architecture. The monumental gate at the entry into the town survived returning Ottomans, when most of the Austrian upgrades were destroyed, per the peace agreement, but was destroyed later. It was restored during the next Austrian occupation in the 1790s, and was used by the military units, and when Serbian army entered the fortress, they named it Gate of Prince Eugen. The gate was located at the newly formed entry into the town, which was declared an imperial city, attested by the emperor's monogram above the entry. There was an inscription on the gate: "Charles VI, Roman emperor, august, apostle of the true faith against Christian enemies, built this gate, a magnificent structure, after conquering the famed city of Belgrade". Internal façade symbolized the entry portal into the Habsburg empire. Above the portal was a cartouche with the coat of arms of Serbia, as an Austrian crown land. Cartouche held an ornamental motive which represented boar's head pierced with an arrow. During the World War II occupation, the Nazi fringe organization Ahnenerbe conducted numerous surveys and diggings in the fortress, including specific search for the gate. By 1943, the Germans completely rebuilt the gate in greatest detail, but the gate was damaged already during the heavy Allied Easter bombing in April 1944. After the war, the gate was left to the elements for a long time, with some works being done in 1964 and in the 1970s. In May 2021 city administration announced its reconstruction, which began in April 2022.
Inner Sava Gate				
Outer Sava Gate				
Port Gate	Port Gate		44°49′39″N 20°26′58″E	Main entrance to Belgrade's port.
Vidin Gate	Vidin Gate	18th century	44°49′37″N 20°27′6″E	Northeastern gate of the Lower City.
Water Gate I			44°49′28″N 20°26′45″E	Part of the riverbank fortifications which were built from the 15th to the 18th century, when the final appearance of the rampart along the river was completed. When the railroad around the fortress was constructed, the gate was closed by the railroad embankment in 1938. It was originally still visible, but when the embankment was filled further later, and the railroad elevated, it was completely buried. It was dug out again in March 2022, during the construction of the linear park, though the archaeologists new about it from old writings and plans. It was built from Austrian-type bricks (30 cm × 15 cm × 7 cm (11.8 in × 5.9 in × 2.8 in)) and thought to have a baroque façade which survived only in fragments since it was destroyed during the construction of 4 metres (13 ft) tall earthen embankment and 500 metres (1,600 ft) of railway which enclosed the gate in the 1930s. The 2022 survey showed the gate actually had no baroque façade. The embankment also damaged the bank's ramparts (outer bank rampart and riverbank rampart). The gate itself was built between 1717 and 1736 as the entrance through the riverbank rampart. Above the gate, remains of the sentry box, dating from the period when the gate was built, was discovered. Remains of another structure, dated to the 19th century were also found. Both were made from the same materials as the gate itself. Entrance was paved with wood cobbles. Access ramp, from the 18th century, was also discovered, but the fortification below appears to be from the 15th century. Numerous artefacts were also discovered.
Water Gate II			44°49′36″N 20°26′49″E	It is part of the same riverbank rampart, but is located closer to the Nebojša Tower. It is archaeologically surveyed, and, in terms of architecture, different from the Water Gate I, though made of the same materials. It was originally discovered in the 1980s.

=== Outer city gates ===
When Austrians occupied northern Serbia, including Belgrade, in the early 18the century, apart from rebuilding and renovating the Fortress, they dug a moat outside of the Fortress, as the first line of defense. It became known as the "Laudan trench" (Serbian Laudanov šanac or simply Šanac). It was up to 6 meters wide, 2 meters deep and on the outer side had reinforcements in the form of earth embankments or walls. In order to get to and out of the city, a system of many gates and bridges was built through and on the trench. They all had a permanent military crew and were always locked at night. These outer city gates were demolished from 1862 to 1866, together with the outer city wall they were in. Commemorative plaques mark their former locations now.

Name	Photograph	Built	Location	Description
Sava Gate	Plaque which marks the place of Sava Gate		44°49′6″N 20°26′58″E	The Southern city gate. It was through this gate that revolutionaries entered Belgrade to capture it during the Siege of Belgrade (1806), in the First Serbian Uprising, after it was opened by Uzun-Mirko and Konda Bimbaša. It was connecting Savamala, the former village, and later the first Belgrade neighborhood outside of the fortress built from 1834, with the fortress. The gate was demolished in 1862.
Stambol Gate	Plaque which marks the place of Stambol Gate	1723–1739	44°48′59″N 20°27′37″E	The southeastern and main city gate, it was located in front of today's National Theatre. It was built by Austria. Later, the gate was used for public executions. A symbol of Turkish oppression, it was demolished in April–May 1866.
Varoš Gate	Plaque which marks the place of Varoš Gate		44°48′59.5728″N 20°27′11.1276″E	The gate was in the wall between Stambol and Sava gates. It was located where Pop Lukina today receives Maršala Birjuzova street. Remains of the gate can still be found as part of the foundations of the neighboring houses. Varoš Gate (in Serbian Varoš Kapija) gave its name to the surrounding neighborhood. It was demolished in 1862.
Vidin Gate	Plaque which marks the place of Vidin Gate		44°49′14″N 20°27′55″E	The eastern city gate, located near today's First Belgrade Gymnasium. A road which started at the gate was called Vidin Road (Vidinski drum). Section of the road between the Tadeuša Koščuška and the "Bajloni market" was later renamed Cara Dušana, while the remaining section, to the Takovska, is today named Džordža Vašingtona. The gate was demolished in 1862.

== Modern gates ==
Name	Photograph	Built	Location	Description
Eastern Gate of Belgrade	Eastern Gate of Belgrade	1980	44°47′3″N 20°30′44″E	A complex of three highrise residential buildings easily visible on approach to Belgrade from east on the E75 highway.
Western Gate of Belgrade	Western Gate of Belgrade	1977	44°49′13″N 20°24′17″E	A highrise, easily visible on approach to Belgrade from west on the E70/E75 highway. While the building looks like a gate, having two towers connected at the top, the highway actually passes southwest of the building.
