= Siege of Belgrade (1806) =

1806 siege during the First Serbian Uprising

- Part of the First Serbian Uprising
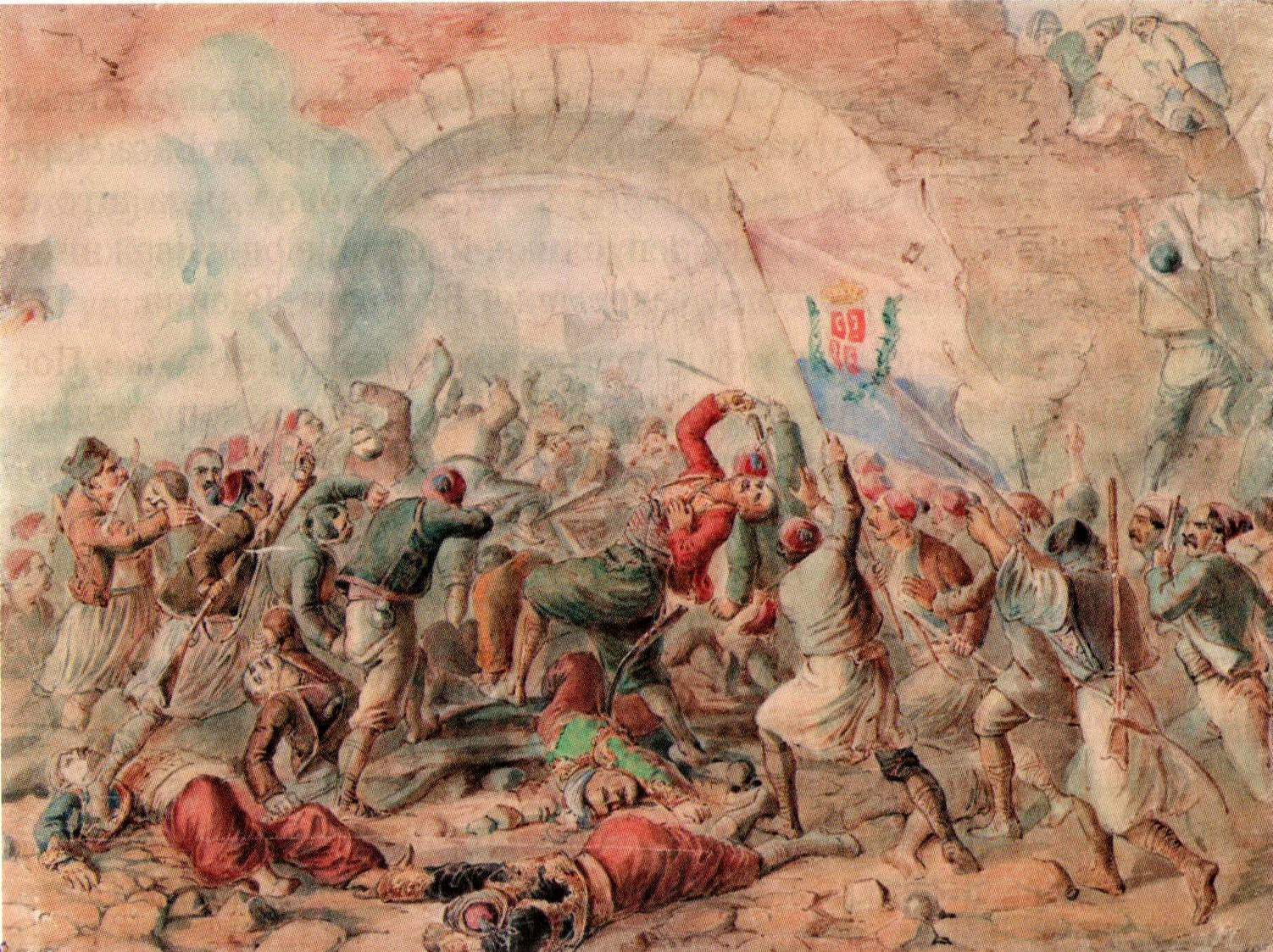
- The death of Vasa Čarapić at the Stambol Gate
Date	12–26 December 1806
Location	Belgrade, Ottoman Empire
Result	Serbian victory

Belligerents
Revolutionary Serbia	Ottoman Empire

Commanders and leaders
(Revolutionary Serbia) Karađorđe Petrović; (Revolutionary Serbia) Sima Marković; (Revolutionary Serbia) Vasa Čarapić †; (Revolutionary Serbia) Stanoje Glavaš; (Revolutionary Serbia) Vule Ilić Kolarac	(Ottoman Empire) Mehmed-aga Fočić; (Ottoman Empire) Mula Jusuf

Units involved
(Revolutionary Serbia) First Serbian Army	(Ottoman Empire) Ottoman Army

Strength
12,000–25,000; 40 cannons	300 cannons

Casualties and losses
50 dead, 60 wounded	Around 300 dead, many captured

The Siege of Belgrade (Serbian: Опсада Београда, romanized: Opsada Beograda), known as the Liberation of Belgrade (Ослобођење Београда, Oslobođenje Beograda) was carried out by the Serbian rebels led by Karađorđe, seeking to overthrow the Ottoman government in the Sanjak of Smederevo, which was seated in the Belgrade Fortress. Following the victories at Mišar (13–15 August) and Deligrad (3 September), the Serbian rebels marched towards Belgrade.

Belgrade was in Serbian hands by 26 December 1806.

== The battle ==
The plan of penetrating the town of Belgrade, through taking over the Sava, Varoš, Stambol and Vidin Gate), was presented by Konda Bimbaša to Karađorđe. Konda, well aware of the operating procedures of the Ottoman guard, took the leadership over volunteers to take over the Sava gate, accompanied by Uzun-Mirko. Karađorđe decided with the commanders that the attack be carried out on Saint Andrew's Day, during Eid al-Fitr, when the attention of the guards was lower. Rebel columns were set on each gate, to storm after the gate was taken, commanded by Miloje Petrović, Sima Marković, Vasa Čarapić, Stanoje Glavaš and Vule Ilić. At the estimated time, Konda, Uzun-Mirko, Petar Sremac, Nikola Stambolija, Karlovalija, Dragić, and Mladen headed out, followed by a detachment of volunteers, and then the main column of Miloje Petrović. Since they arrived unnoticed at the gate, Konda and Uzun-Mirko first climbed the rampart and jumped over the palisade, and headed towards the guards on a bypassing road. Met by an Ottoman patrol, they presented themselves as kırcalıs, then proceeded to the town gates and guards where they divided into two groups. Uzun-Mirko and Konda attacked the guards, and the rest broke into the gate locks with axes. In the fight, Uzun-Mirko received two wounds, and Konda five, but they kept on. Even though shots were fired, the Turks in the town and at the rest of the gates did not suspect that a Serbian attack was in question, but that shots were fired for the holiday. After taking over the first gates, commandos went toward the Varoš Gate, at which time the Turks were alarmed. Most of the Turks tried to reach the Upper Fortress (Kalemegdan), while the resistance was provided by the so-called krdžalije. Uzun-Mirko and Konda also fought on the Varoš Gate, while Vasa Čarapić died taking over the Stambol Gate, and Stanoje Glavaš and Vule Ilić penetrated through the Vidin Gate, after which the rebels easily took over the town towards Kalemegdan.

=== Aftermath ===
In January 1807, the Ottomans accepted "Ičko's Peace", however, the rebels rejected it and sought Russian aid to their independence, signing a Russian-Serbian military alliance in June.

== Gallery ==
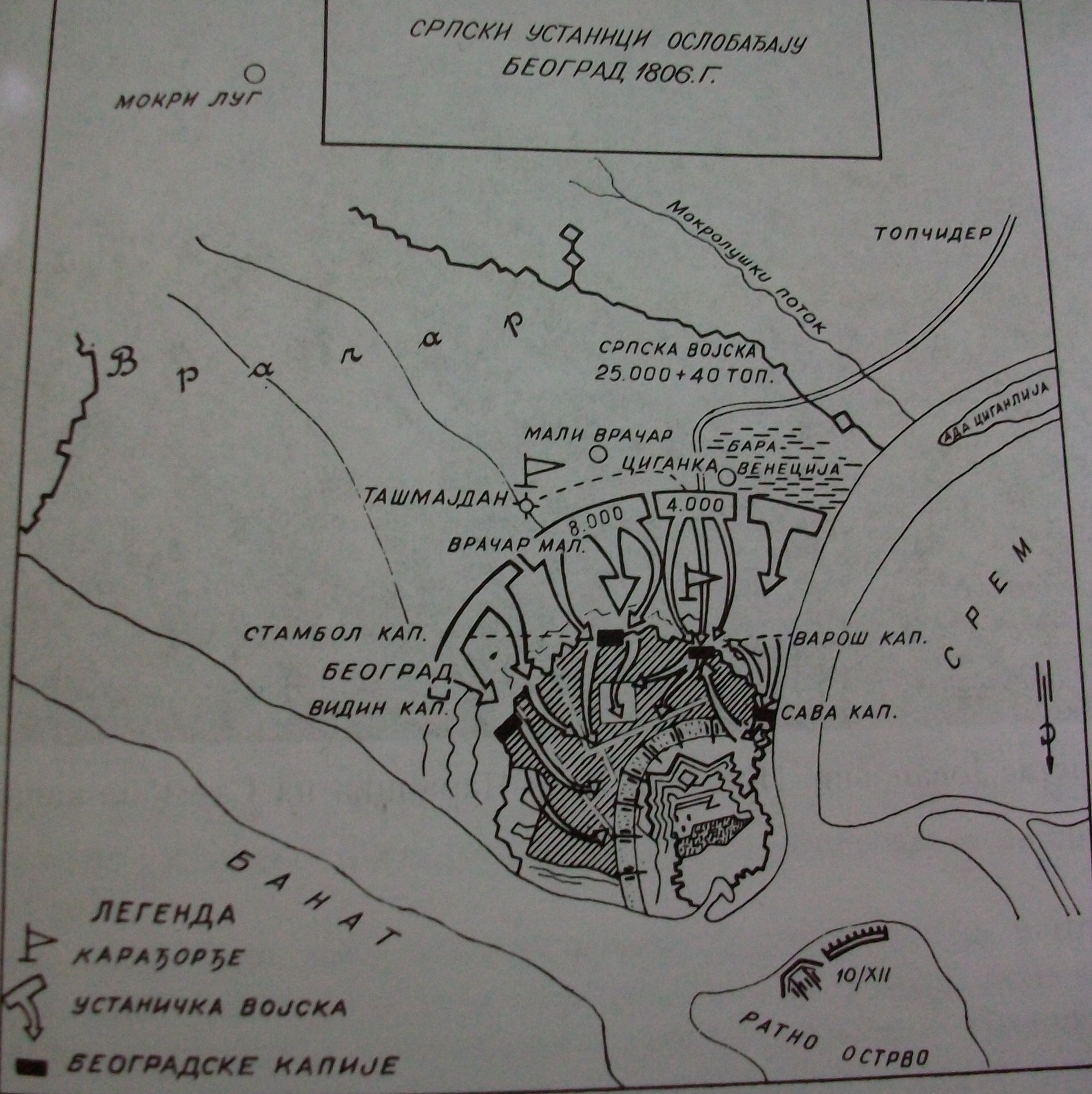
Attack plan

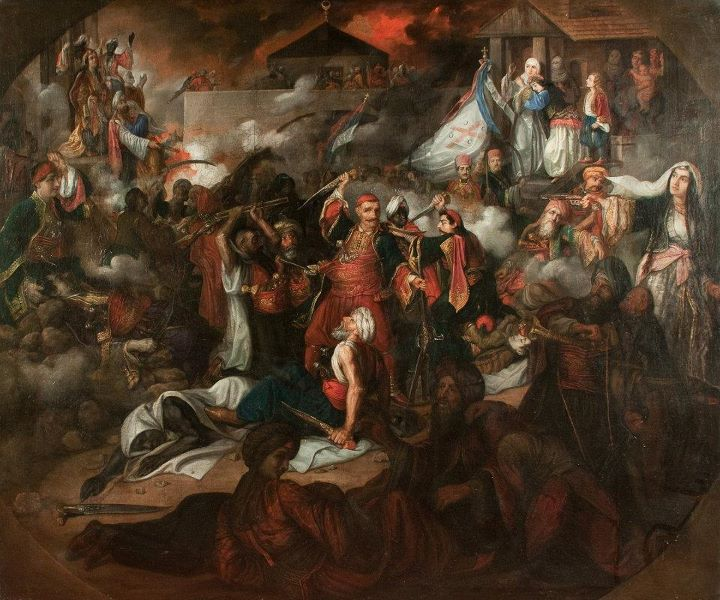
The Conquest of Belgrade by Katarina Ivanović

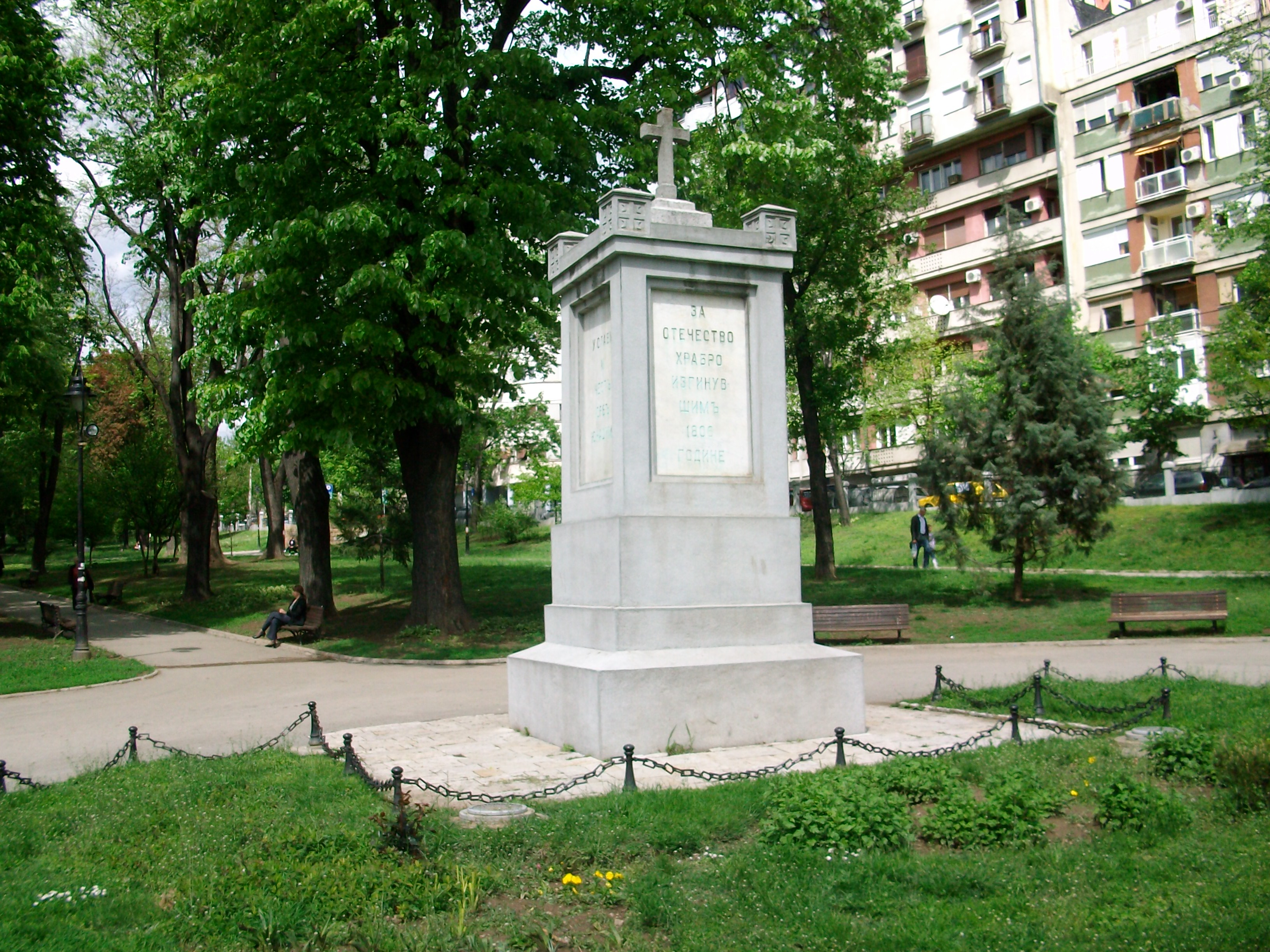
Monument and the Cemetery to the Liberators of Belgrade 1806

== Sources ==
- Radosavljević, Nedeljko V.; Marinković, Mirjana O. (2012). "Једна османска наредба о војном уништењу Србије из 1807. године" [An Ottoman order on the military destruction of Serbia from 1807]. Истраживања. 23: 283–293.
- Stojančević, Vladimir (1957). "Борбе за ослобођење Београда 1804–1806 године" (PDF). ГОДИШЊАК. IV. Музеј града Београда: 111–142.
- Terzić, Velimir (1957). "Ослобођење Београда од Турака 1806–1807 године (Поводом 150 годишњице од ослобођења)" (PDF). ГОДИШЊАК. IV. Музеј града Београда: 143–158.
- Tošković, J. (1930). "O padu Beograda i Šapca, 26. decembra 1806. 26. januara 1807. god". Beograd.
- Timotijević, Miroslav (2013). "МЕМОРИЈАЛ ОСЛОБОДИОUИМА БЕОГРАДА 1806" (PDF). Nasleđe (in Serbian). Belgrade: Zavod za zaštitu spomenika kulture grada Beograda.
- Veselinović, Rajko L. (1957). "Жртве и надгробни споменици ослободилаца београдске вароши од Турака у Првом српском устанку" (PDF). ГОДИШЊАК. IV. Музеј града Београда: 181–194.
- Veselinović, Rajko L. (1957). "Прославе годишњице ослобођења Београда од Турака од времена Првог устанка до данас" (PDF). ГОДИШЊАК. IV. Музеј града Београда: 195–206.
