= Zindan Gate =

Gate in Belgrade Fortress

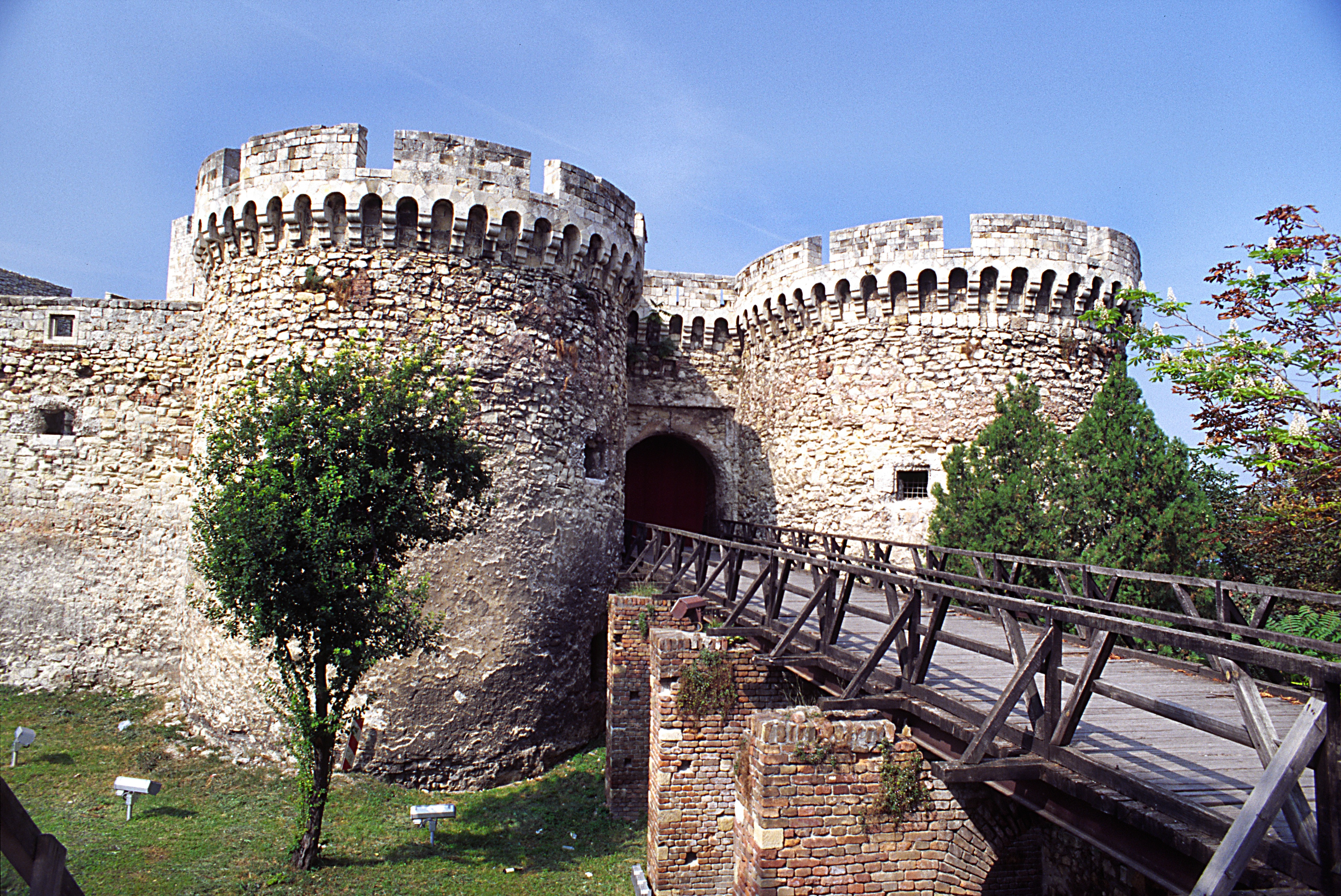
Zindan Gate, viewed from the outer, Leopold's Gate direction

Zindan Gate (Serbian: Зиндан капија, romanized: Zindan kapija) is one of the gates in the complex of Belgrade Fortress, historical core of Belgrade, the capital of Serbia. It was built at a time when fortifications were transitioning from cold weapons to artillery, and when first cannons were introduced in the defense. Finished between 1440 and 1456, due to its unique appearance among the fortress' gates, and the 1930s reconstruction and upgrade in the Romanticist style, the medieval barbican is one of the landmarks of the fortress, and one of its most recognizable parts.

== Location ==
The Zindan Gate is a middle southeastern gate, in the Danube direction. It occupies the northernmost section of fortress' Upper Town. From the southeast, it is accessed via a wooden bridge over dry moat from an "inside" direction of the Despots's Gate and People's Observatory in Dizdar's Tower. Another wooden bridge on the counter or "outside", southeast side connects it to the Leopold's Gate, Kalmegdan Terrace restaurant, and further to Belgrade Zoo and Little Kalemegdan. Just to the north, and connected via pathways, are Ružica Church, Jakšić Tower and path to the Lower Town.

== History ==
=== Middle Ages ===
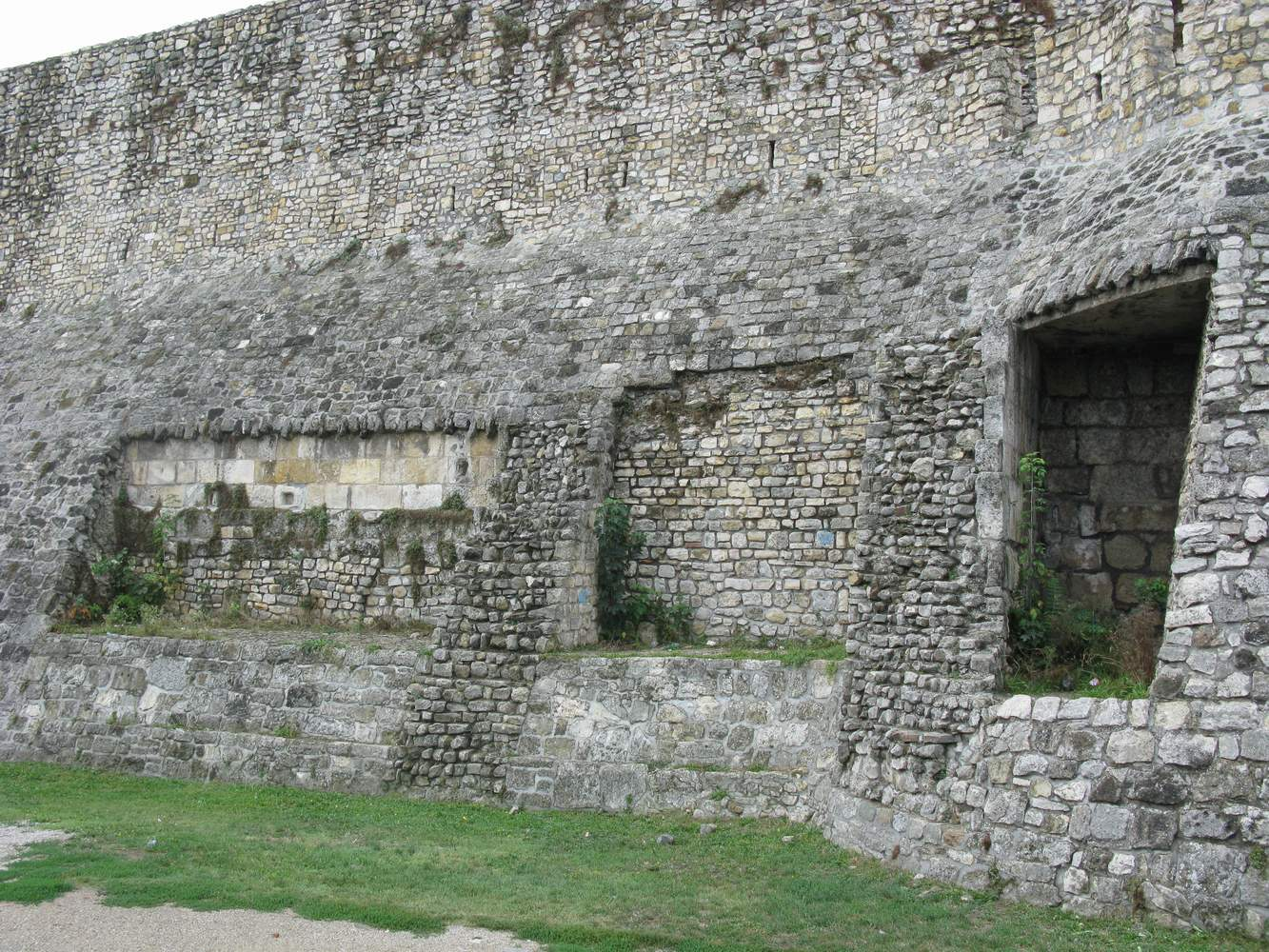
Probing of the walls, just south of the gate, with visible walls of the Roman Singidunum

Rampart just south of the gate was probed during archaeological surveys and the walls of the Roman castrum Singidunum were discovered. Singidunum predated present fortress, and Belgrade in general.

The fortress, for centuries being on borderline of various states, consisted of Upper Towen and Lower Town. Unsuccessful attempt by the Ottomans sultan Murad II to conquer Belgrade in 1440, showed that gates within the fortress are among the main weak spots in defense of the city. Hungarian forces, which held the fortress at the time, walled the Upper Town's Southern Gate, and the Eastern Gate took its role. Between 1440 and 1456, both Eastern Gates (in Upper and Lower Town), were supplemented with barbicans, which also included gates - Eastern Gate II in the Lower Town, and Zindan Gate in the Upper Town.

The gate was built between two round towers in order to modernize the fortress and to reinforce the defense of the Eastern Gate (today Despot's Gate), which, at the time, was the main entrance into the city. It was built as an outpost, or barbican, made of two massive semi-round towers, with the passage between them. At the time, there was a moat in front of the gate, crossed by the drawbridge, while the space between the gate and the cornered tower of the Upper Town was closed with the 11 metres (36 ft) tall, arched bridge. Above the gate's arch there is a small, rectangle niche, with an alcove for the icon of the saint, protector of the city. Atop the towers and the connecting arch wall can be seen seven cannon openings.

The gate was situated in front of the former Southern Gate. It functioned as the main entrance into the Upper Town and the first defense of the Eastern Gate. It is strategically placed on an elevation, which sharply descends from the Arched Rampart into the Lower Town and the confluence of Danube and Sava. This left only a small, restricted access from the land which was easily controlled. Below the Zindan Gate is the Eastern Gate II which had the same role, but in the defense of the Lower Town's Eastern Gate. The Zindan Gate's line of fire, which included seven cannons, was one of the most modern solutions used in Europe at the time. The 1456 Siege of Belgrade under sultan Mehmed II the Conqueror was the first recorded artillery defense in the fortress, which helped to again defend the city from the Ottomans.

=== Modern period ===
After these failed attempts, Belgrade was finally taken by the Ottomans in 1521. As they continued further into the Central Europe, reaching Vienna, Belgrade Fortress lost its military importance, and the Ottomans stopped upgrading, or even maintaining the fortress properly. As a result, the Austrians easily took over Belgrade in 1688. They decided to turn the fortress into the bulwark of Christendom and hired Venetian architect Andrea Cornaro to head the reconstruction of the entire complex, including the Zindan Gate. After his design. the earthen embankment in front of the gate was transformed into the proper ravelin, with slanted, cut passage. The Ottomans regained Belgrade already in 1691, and they rehired Cornaro to finish the works, so he added the vault.

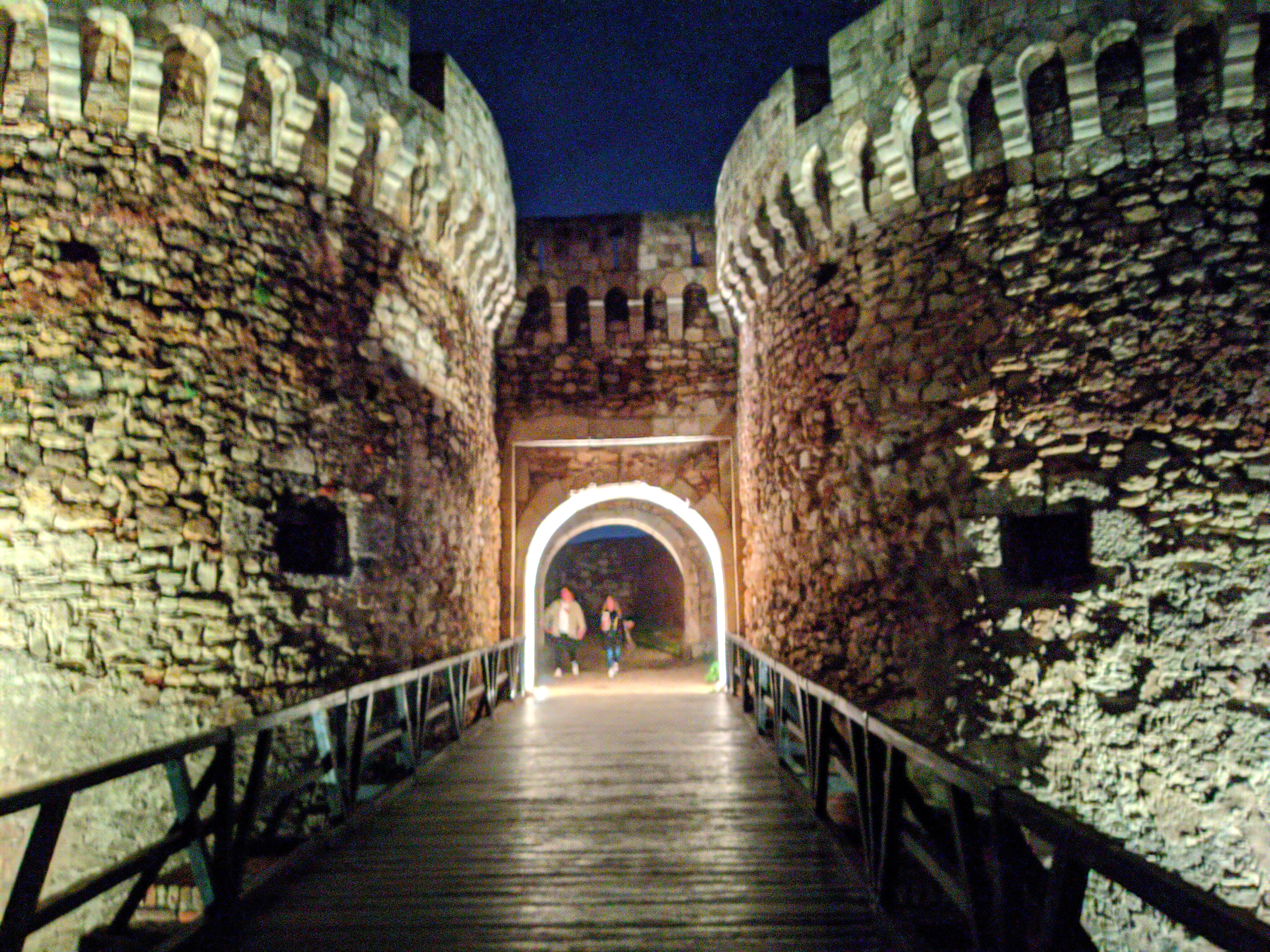
Zindan Gate by night

Belgrade became a frontier town again, and the fortress regained its military importance. A second major reconstruction occurred during another Austrian occupation from 1718 to 1739. The period saw unprecedented transformation of the entire fortress, which was remodeled into the bastion fort after the plans and designs by the Swiss military engineer Nicolas Doxat. Within the project, the Zindan Gate was remodeled to suite the artillery warfare. The towers were roofed with bricks, while the protective arched wall was fortified with the earthen embankment. Masoned staircases were built, with access corridors, for both towers. The Ottomans retook the fortress in 1739, losing it again to the Austrians in 1788, before regaining it in 1791. Since the late 18th century, after the tower again lost its military importance, the Ottomans used towers' basements as dungeons, or zindan in Turkish language, hence the name of the gate.

In October 1915, a grenade fired from the 42 cm Gamma Mörser hit the fortress wall right above the church but didn't explode. Church was badly damaged by this time and if the grenade exploded (cartridge weighted 900 kg (2,000 lb) and contained 96 kg (212 lb) of TNT), it would destroy the wall of the Zindan Gate tower which was hit and would level the church to the ground as it is located below the wall.

The 1938 restoration of the gate included upgrade in the Romanticist style. The tower's roof was modeled to be crown shaped. The parapet wall was added, with pseudo-embrasures, akin to the appearance of the Dubrovnik's fortification. The Zindan Gate never had such appearance in history and remains today as the only gate in the fortress with such roof. During the 1960s reconstruction, it was suggested that the venue could be adapted into the museum of Despot Stefan Lazarević.

The wooden bridge in front of the gate was reconstructed in 2005 and 2020. Massive reconstruction began in April 2022. Works also included moisture problems solving, revitalization of the walls and their statics, and reconstruction of the side rooms to make them usable again. Draining pipes were placed in the Arch Rampart above the gate, to drain water from the gate, towers and the Ružica Church, which leans on its opposite side. Wooden roofs in the tower rooms were replaced, and the doors and windows placed.

== Characteristics ==
The Zindan Gate occupies northeastern corner of the fortress' ridge and is one of four entries into the Upper Town. Gate's arched entry portal is flanked with two semicircular towers, known as the Northern and Southern Tower. Behind the portal is the passage, with side corridors which lead into the towers. The base of the passage is squared, and corridors connect various levels of the towers. There is one window on both side walls, at the height of 1.25 metres (4 ft 1 in). The towers, though identical and built for the same purpose, are not directly connected. The gate has massive iron door from the inner side. The Arched Rampart extends from the Northern Tower, and, in time, has been transformed into the bastion. Another rampart goes from the Southern Tower, in the direction of the Upper Town's Northeast Rampart's trench. This rampart ends with caponier, before reaching the trench.

Due to its unusual name and unique appearance within the fort's complex, it is one of the most distinct gates. The gate is referred in the song Ruža vetrova by the Bajaga i Instruktori.
