= Konda Bimbaša =

Albanian mercenary

Konda Bimbaša; (Serbian Cyrillic: Конда Бимбаша; Albanian: Konda Bimbashi), fl. March 1804–d. May/June 1807) was an Albanian in Alija Gušanac's Dahije detachment in the Sanjak of Smederevo who switched sides to the Serb rebels during the First Serbian Uprising, proclaimed a hero for his efforts in the Siege of Belgrade (1806).

== Biography ==
Konda was an Orthodox Albanian from Struga. He began his military career in 1804, as a mercenary (krdžalija) in the forces of Alija Gušanac. Gušanac served the Dahije, the renegade Janissaries that took over the Sanjak of Smederevo defying the Sultan since 1801. After the slaughter of the Knezes (January 1804), the Serbs decided to rise up against the Dahije after gathering in Orašac on 14 February. They crushed the power of the Dahije by August, but some towns were still held by the Dahije. The Ottomans now turned against the Serbs, and Gušanac had by then joined the Ottomans. In March 1804, with Gušanac's forces, Konda had gone to the Morava, around Ćuprija, and from there to the city of Belgrade where he stayed until prior to autumn 1806. At that time, he had the rank of bölükbaşı (captain). Konda joined the Serb rebels three months prior to the siege of Belgrade which took place on 30 November (Saint Andrew's Day). He received the rank of bimbaša (major) in the rebel army, hence, is known as Konda Bimbaša (Конда Бимбаша) in historiography.

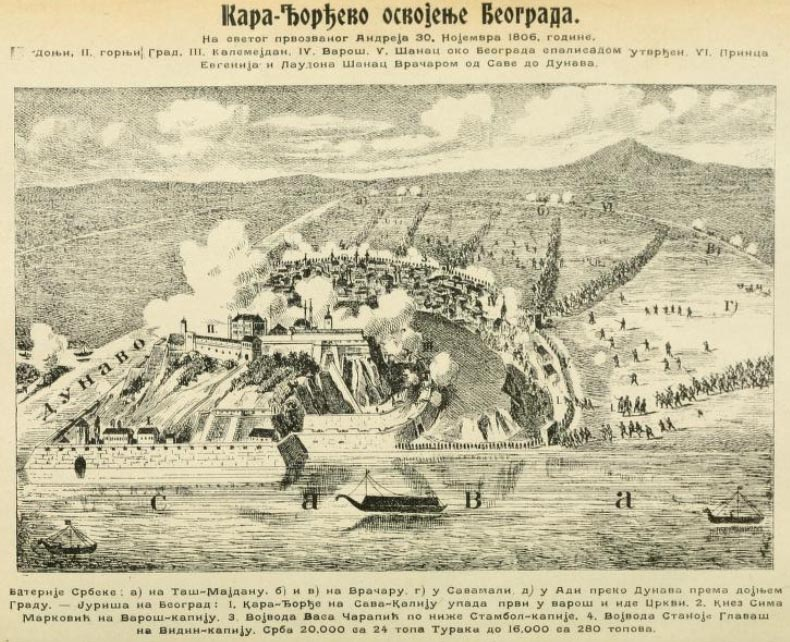
Illustration of Belgrade during the siege. The Sava Gate, taken over by Konda and Uzun-Mirko, is the southernmost gate, by the Sava river.

The plan of penetrating the town of Belgrade, through taking over the Sava, Varoš, Stambol and Vidin gates (see Gates of Belgrade), was presented by Konda to Karađorđe. Konda, well aware of the functioning of the Ottoman guard, took the leadership over volunteers to take over the Sava gate, accompanied by Uzun-Mirko. Karađorđe decided with the commanders that the attack is carried out on Saint Andrew's Day, during Eid al-Fitr when the attention of the guards was lower. Rebel columns were set on each gate, to storm after the gate was taken, commanded by Miloje Petrović-Trnavac, Sima Marković, Vasa Čarapić, Stanoje Glavaš and Vule Ilić. At the estimated time, Konda, Uzun-Mirko, Petar Sremac, Nikola Stambolija, Karlovalija, Dragić and Mladen headed out, followed by a detachment of volunteers, and then the main column of Miloje Petrović. Since they arrived unnoticed at the gate, Konda and Uzun-Mirko first climbed the rampart and jumped over the palisade and headed towards the guards on a bypassing road. Met by an Ottoman patrol, they presented themselves as krdžalije, then proceeded to the town gates and guards where they divided into two groups. Uzun-Mirko and Konda attacked the guards, and the rest broke into the gate locks with axes. In the fight, Uzun-Mirko received two wounds, and Konda five, but they kept on. Even though shots were fired, the Turks in the town and at the rest of the gates did not suspect that a Serbian attack was in question, but that shots were fired for the holiday. After taking over the first gates, commandos went toward the Varoš Gate, at which time the Turks were alarmed. Most of the Turks tried to reach the Upper Fortress (Kalemegdan), while the resistance was provided by the krdžalije. Uzun-Mirko and Konda also fought on the Varoš Gate, while Vasa Čarapić died taking over the Stambol Gate, and Stanoje Glavaš and Vule Ilić penetrated through the Vidin Gate, after which the rebels easily took over the town towards Kalemegdan. According to another account, mentioned by Petar Jokić, Konda and Uzun-Mirko first entered a caravanserai (inn) prior to the attack, as they knew Turkish they were unsuspicious; their fighters, not knowing that their leaders were not present while approaching the rampart entered a conflict with Turks, at which time Konda and Uzun-Mirko fought the Turks in the inn.

After taking over Belgrade, Konda looked after his wounds in the former shelter of dahija Aganlija. After recuperating, he returned to the battlefield. Konda fell at the Battle of Loznica (as mentioned by Doukas and Dositej Obradović). Milan Milićević at first supported this in his work Kneževina Srbija, but then changed it and claimed that Konda survived the battle, in his work Pomenik.

According to Andra Gavrilović, Konda's identity was confused with that of another rebel, Jovča Mihailović "Konda" (fl. 1807–13), and possibly more individuals; in that way "the hero of Belgrade" became a legendary person. Milićević included a story in which Konda died after 1820. "Konda" fought at Užice and Loznica (1807), and lived in Belgrade in 1808 according to two contemporary documents, and was mentioned as organizing war necessarities along with Raka Levajac in 1812, and left Serbia for Austria in 1813 following the suppression of the revolt, and after a short while moved to Bessarabia where he lived as an outlaw. Gavrilović was the first to critically study Milićević's accounts on Konda. R. Perović also mentioned a story that Konda was an Orthodox named Toma and was born in Lom-Palanka, in the Vidin Pashaluk, similarly found in Milićević's account on the birthplace of "Konda".

In composer Svetomir Nastasijević's opera The First Uprising, written in 1954, Konda is included among the characters. A street in Belgrade bears his name (Kondina ulica).

== See also ==
- Naum Krnar
- List of Serbian Revolutionaries

== Sources ==
Books

- Gavrilović, Andra (1904). "Crte iz istorije oslobođenja Srbije". pp. 101–110. (Public domain)
- Ćorović, Vladimir (2001) [1997]. Историја српског народа (in Serbian). Belgrade: Јанус.
- Nenadović, Konstantin N. (1903) [1883]. Život i dela velikog Đorđa Petrovića Kara-Đorđa Vrhovnog Vožda, oslobodioca i Vladara Srbije i život njegovi Vojvoda i junaka: Kao gradivo za Srbsku Istoriju od godine 1804 do 1813 i na dalje [The Life and Works of the Great George Petar Kara-George the Supreme Leader, Liberationist and Ruler of Serbia and the Life of His Duke and Hero: As Material for Serbian History from 1804 to 1813 and Beyond] (in Serbian). Sloboda. pp. 544–546.
- Petrovich, Michael Boro (1976). A history of modern Serbia, 1804-1918. Harcourt Brace Jovanovich. ISBN 9780151409501.
- Perović, Radoslav (1954a). Grada za istoriju Prvog srpskog ustanka. pp. 99, 314, 329.
- Perović, Radoslav (1954b). Prilozi za istoriju Prvog srpskog ustanka. Narodna Knjiga. pp. 51–53, 108.

Journals

- Đorđević, Smiljana. Сведочанство Николе Лапчевића о Конди Бимбаши. Književna istorija 2005, vol. 37, br. 125-12 (in Serbian). Belgrade: Institut za književnost i umetnost. Archived from the original on February 18, 2015.
- Zlatković, Branko. "Oslobodjenje Beograda 1806. u tradiciji" (in Serbian). Српски научни центар.
