= Varoš Gate =

City gate in Belgrade, Serbia

Coordinates: 44°48′59″N 20°27′11″E

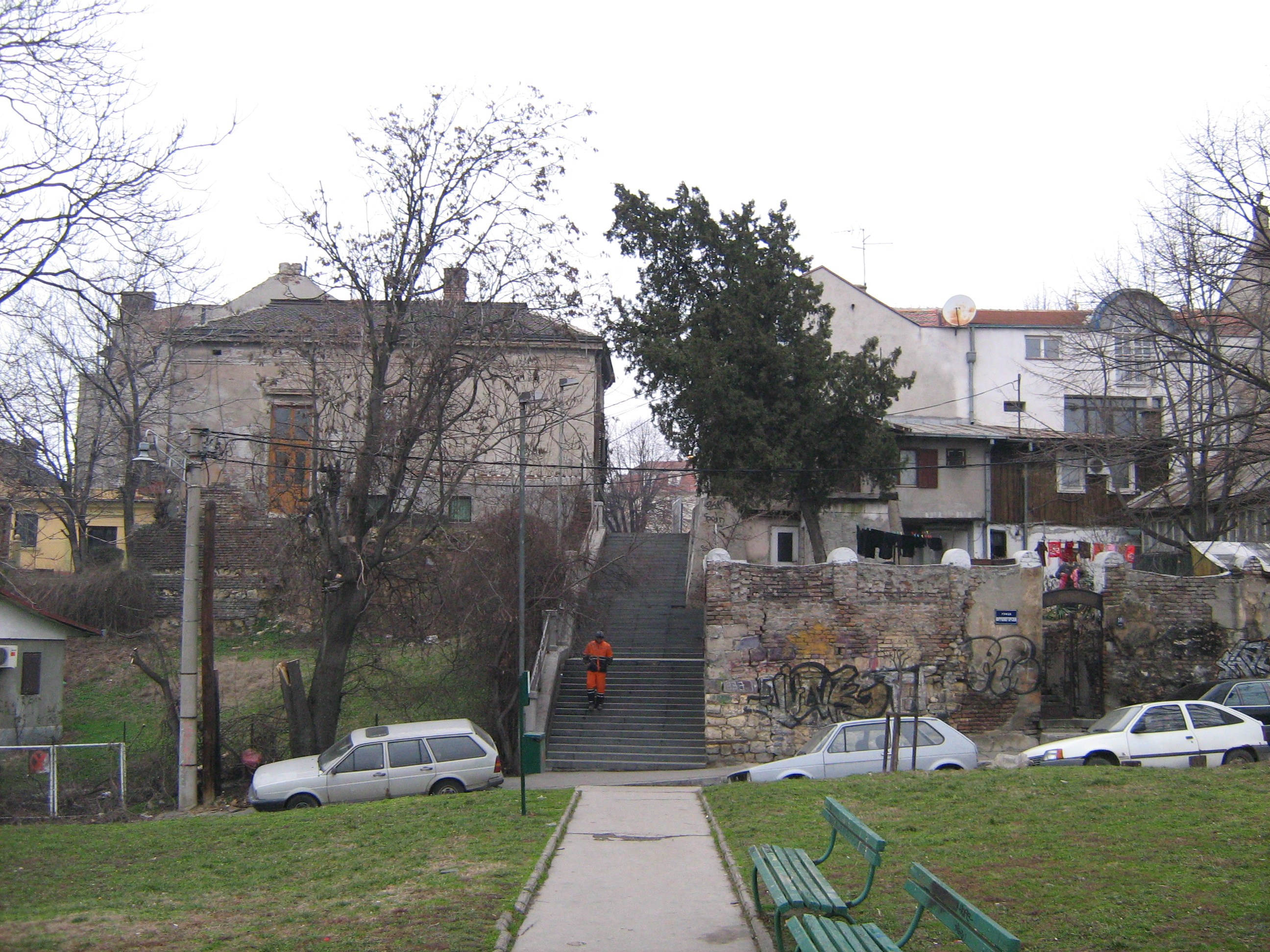
Kosančićev Venac

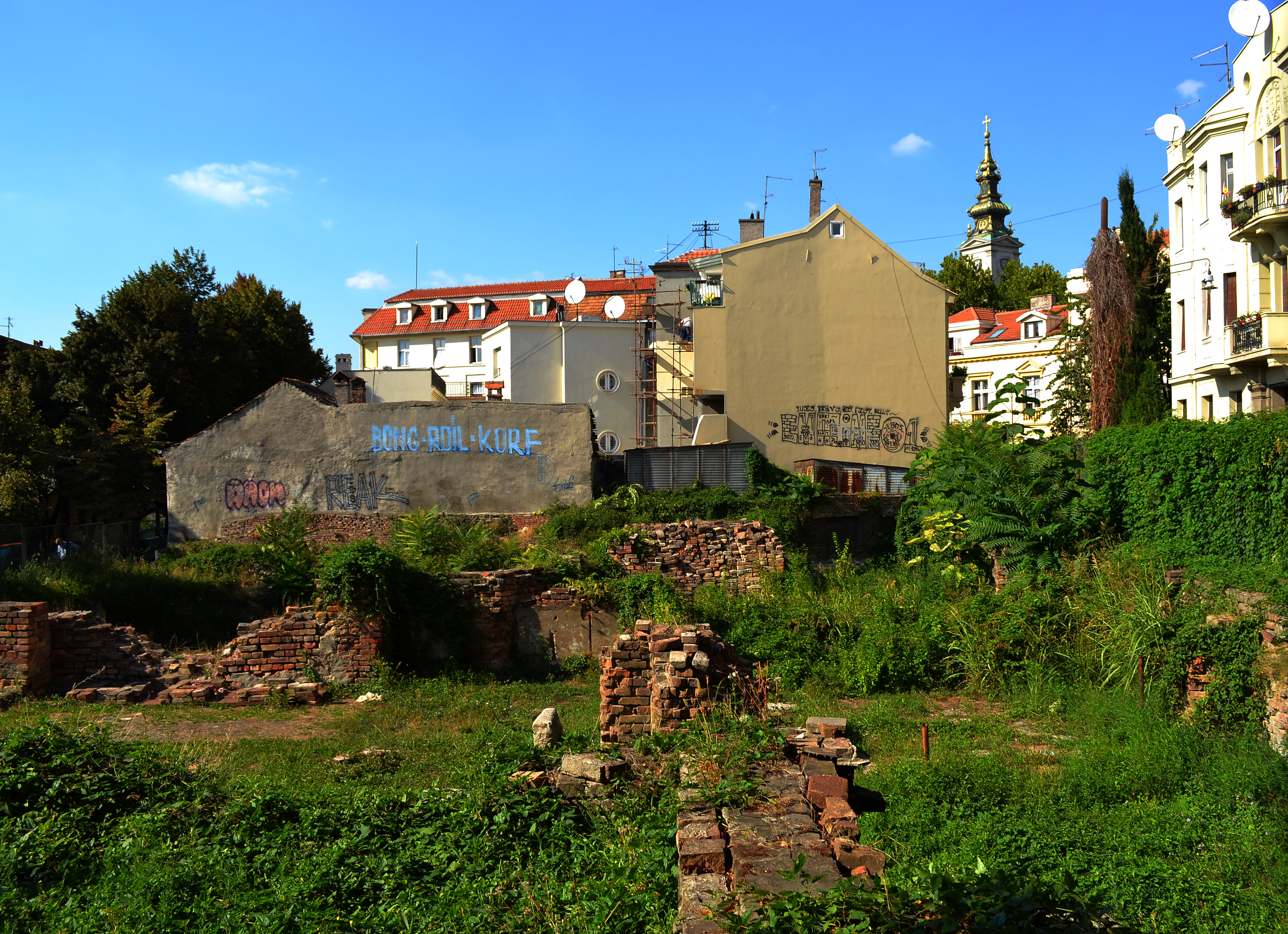
Excavations of the old National library of Serbia building in the area

The Varoš Gate (Serbian Cyrillic: Варош капија, romanized: Varoš kapija), literally city gate, is a part of the city of Belgrade, the capital of Serbia. It got its name from one of the original four historical gates, which allowed access to the city. It is located near the river Sava, Branko's Bridge and Pop-Lukina Street.

== History ==
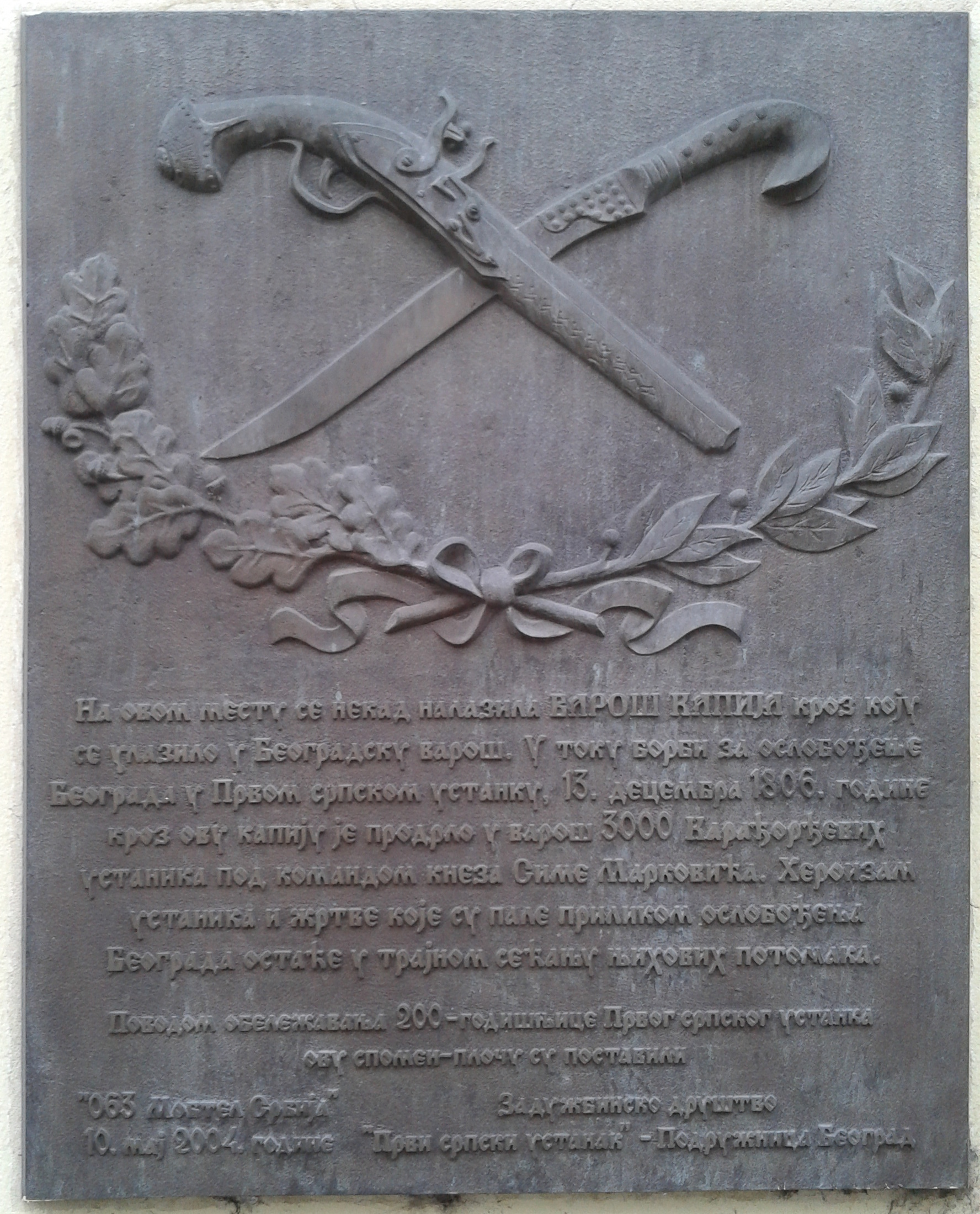
Plaque at the location of the Varoš Gate

This is one of the oldest parts of the city. In the vicinity of the Varoš Gate, during the Ottoman rule over Belgrade, mainly Serbs lived, while Kalemegdan and Dorćol were under the Otoman administration.

In 1806, during the capture of Belgrade by the Serbian revolutionaries in the First Serbian Uprising, Sima Marković, one of the leaders of the uprising, led his men into the city through the Varoš Gate; his force was the first to enter the city.

The gate was demolished in 1862, during the Serbian–Ottoman clashes and the subsequent Ottoman bombardment of the city. It was built of stone and clay and was primarily used to defend the Sava embankment against possible attack. However, compared to the Stambol Gate, it was considerably smaller and its importance was also not that great.

In the 20th century, the preserved parts of the neighborhood served as backdrops for several well-known Serbian films and TV series, such as Otpisani (1974–76), The Marathon Family (1982), Underground (1995) by Emir Kusturica. There is also the tavern (kafana) "?", which is the oldest in Belgrade, and the St. Michael's Cathedral.

== Delimitation ==
From the point of view of local administration, this part of the city belongs to Stari grad, which is located on a differently defined area. The area known as the Varoš Gate is defined by the streets Obilićev Venac, Kosančićev Venac, Pop-Lukina, Kosmajska and Carice Milice.

This part of the city is located on a slope that leads from the river Sava to Knez Mihailova Street. South of the Varoš Gate, Brankova Street leads to Branko's Bridge, where Savamala begins. In this part of the city, some houses from the 19th century have been preserved, as well as period cobblestone paving. Underneath some of the houses there are extensive cellars and underground passages, that were used by the population during armed conflicts (e.g. World War I and World War II).

== See also ==
- List of Belgrade neighbourhoods and suburbs
- Gates of Belgrade
