= The Conquest of Belgrade =

Oil painting by Katarina Ivanović

- Osvajanje Beograda (Serbian)
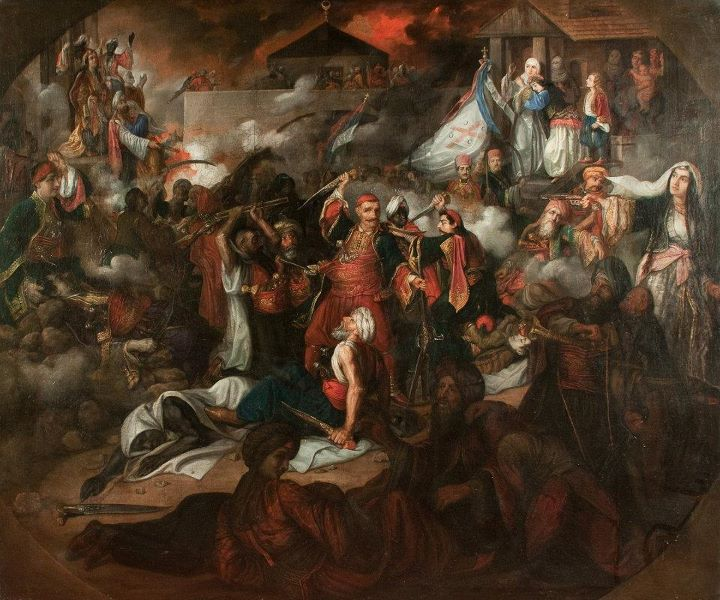
- Artist: Katarina Ivanović
- Year: 1844–1845
- Catalogue: Inventory no. 413
- Medium: Oil on canvas
- Dimensions: 157 cm × 188.5 cm (62 in × 74.2 in)
- Location: National Museum of Serbia; Belgrade; 44.8167°N 20.4594°E

The Conquest of Belgrade (Serbian: Osvajanje Beograda, Serbian Cyrillic: Освајањe Беoгрaдa) (Note: Also translated as The Capture of Belgrade in 1806 and Liberation of the Belgrade in 1806.) is an oil painting by the romanticist Katarina Ivanović, one of Serbia's first significant female painters. Painted between 1844 and 1845, it depicts the capture of Serbia's capital, Belgrade, by Serbian revolutionaries in late 1806, during the First Serbian Uprising.

Ivanović was inspired to create the painting upon reading a book titled History of the Serb People while studying at the Munich Academy. The painting was poorly received by art critics in the Serbian capital. The art historian Lilien Filipovitch-Robinson suggests this was due to its poor compositional and spatial conception.

By the 1870s, Ivanović's works had largely been forgotten in Serbia. The Conquest of Belgrade was one of four paintings offered by Ivanović to the Gallery of Historical Portraits in 1874. The Gallery went on to form the nucleus of what was to become the National Museum of Serbia. The painting is currently in the possession of the National Museum.

== Background ==
According to David A. Norris, a scholar specializing in Serbian cultural history, conditions in 19th-century Serbia were unsuitable for the development of visual art. Materials were difficult to come by, studio and exhibition spaces were virtually non-existent, and there were no art patrons willing to financially support painters and purchase their finished works. In the first half of the 19th century, Serbian visual artists dedicated themselves almost exclusively to decorating the walls of churches and producing icons and other religious objects. There were some painters of Serb heritage living outside Serbia, such as Uroš Knežević and Jovan Popović, who resided in the Austrian Empire.

Another one of these artists was the romanticist Katarina Ivanović, who was born in Székesfehérvár in either 1811 or 1817, and was the first significant Serbian female painter. She left Székesfehérvár around 1835 and went to Budapest to study painting under the master Jozsef Pesky. She remained in Budapest for much of 1835. Later that year she found a patron, a baroness by the name of Czacki. In late 1835, the baroness funded Ivanović's move to Vienna. Precisely what her training entailed is unknown, but since women were not admitted into the Academy of Fine Arts at the time, it is likely that Ivanović was classified as a "special student" and tutored privately. Some scholars have suggested that she studied under Ferdinand Georg Waldmüller, though this cannot be established with any degree of certainty since most documents pertaining to her time in Vienna were destroyed in subsequent wars.

== Description and history ==
An oil on canvas, the painting measures 157 by 188.5 centimetres (61.8 by 74.2 in). It depicts the capture of Belgrade by Serbian revolutionaries in late 1806, during the First Serbian Uprising. This proved to be one of the defining battles of the insurrection. On 29 November 1806, Karađorđe's rebels launched their biggest attack on the city. A small force led by Uzun Mirko spearheaded the assault, seizing the city gates that faced the Sava River. According to legend, one of Mirko's men climbed atop an Ottoman cannon by the gate, signalling that the gate was in the rebels' hands and that the main force led by Vasa Čarapić should attack the Stambol Gate. Čarapić was killed in the ensuing charge, but the attack was ultimately successful, and the Ottomans surrendered the city.

Ivanović had left Vienna in 1840 and gone to study at the Munich Academy, possibly owing to Czacki's further generosity. Subsequent statements suggest that Ivanović was inspired to paint The Conquest of Belgrade around this time. Writing in 1873, she recalled how the painting came about:

While studying at the Munich Academy, I started to read History of the Serb People. I wanted to paint the brave battle of Mirko on my canvas. With seven of his comrades he succeeded in entering the city at night while the Muslims were celebrating Bajram (Eid al-Fitr) and didn't even think about any danger. Mirko and his comrades killed the guards at the town gate. Their rifle shots were the signal for the others.

Ivanović soon travelled to Belgrade, visited the battle site, conversed with some of the participants in the city's capture, and examined period clothing and weaponry used in the battle. The painting was composed between 1844 and 1845. It was painted in Belgrade.

== Legacy ==
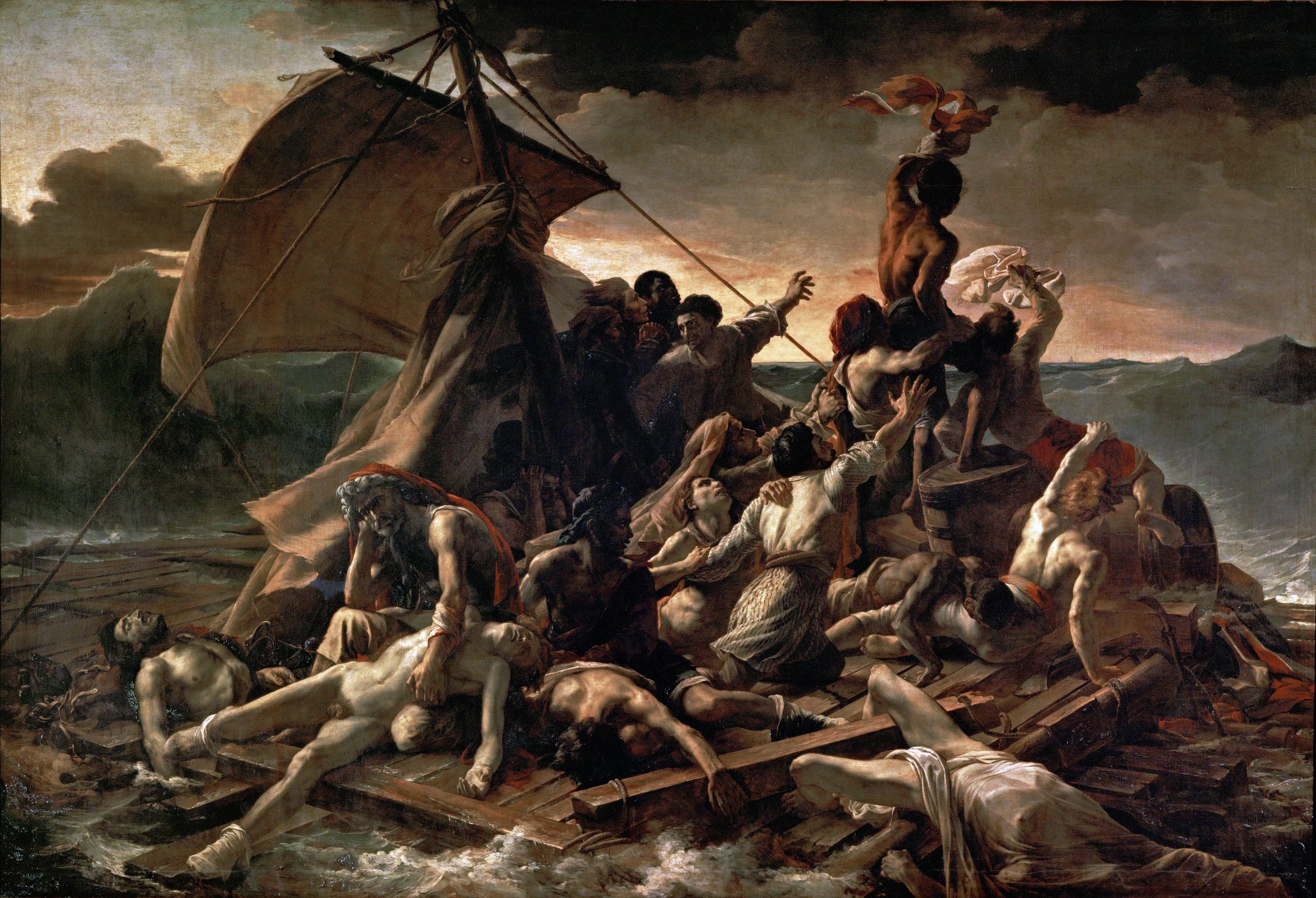
The art historian Lilien Filipovitch-Robinson draws parallels between the painting and Théodore Géricault's The Raft of the Medusa (1818–1819)

According to the art historian Ljubica D. Popovich, The Conquest of Belgrade is the only known historical composition from the second phase of Ivanović's career, which lasted from 1842 to 1847. The painting was not well received by art critics in the Serbian capital. "It was compositionally and spatially poorly conceived," writes Popovich, "but coloristically quite exciting, in cinnabar, umbre and ocher tones." The art historian Žarko Domljan states that the painting is typical of this phase in Ivanović's career, which saw a substantial decline in the quality of her scene paintings. Dissatisfaction with the way her works were received in the Serbian capital prompted Ivanović to leave Serbia.

Lilien Filipovitch-Robinson, another art historian, compares the work's Romantic presentation to Théodore Géricault's depiction of contemporary shipwreck survivors in The Raft of the Medusa (1818–1819) inasmuch as neither is a reliable documentary piece. This, she asserts, is typical of contemporary Serbian painters who did not have a long Romantic tradition and therefore borrowed elements from other artists, especially those from France. Filipovitch-Robinson further describes the painting as "highly theatrical, emotional and stridently Romantic." "In its complexity, deliberate confusion, slashing diagonals, tenebrism and intense colouration," she writes, "it most resembles the paintings of her French Romantic predecessors Géricault and Antoine-Jean Gros, as well as the more contemporary Eugène Delacroix."

Ivanović painted very little in her final years, and is said to have been largely forgotten in Serbia by the 1870s. In June 1876, she became an honorary member of the Serbian Learned Society, which was later to become the Serbian Royal Academy and eventually the Serbian Academy of Sciences and Arts. She died in Székesfehérvár in September 1882.

== Provenance ==
In 1874, Ivanović offered four of her paintings to the Gallery of Historical Portraits, the nucleus of what was later to become the National Museum of Serbia. One of these paintings was The Conquest of Belgrade. The work remains in the possession of the National Museum, and is classified under inventory number 413.
