= Best of Live (Bajaga i Instruktori album) =

Live album by Bajaga i Instruktori
- Released: 2002
- Recorded: Belgrade, Ljubljana, Zagreb, Timișoara, Skopje, Niš; 2002
- Genre: Pop rock; folk rock
- Length: 74:21
- Label: Dallas Records / Metropolis Records

Bajaga i Instruktori chronology
Zmaj od Noćaja (2001)	Best of Live (2002)	Ruža vetrova Beograda (2003)

Best of Live is the second live album by Serbian rock band Bajaga i Instruktori, released in 2002.

The album was recorded in 2002 on the band's concerts in Belgrade, Ljubljana, Zagreb, Timișoara, Skopje, and Niš. It features two previously unrecorded songs: a song in Slovenian, "Slovenačka reč", recorded live, featuring music from the band's old song "Idem (Kao da ne idem, a idem)" and lyrics written by Slovenian journalist Sonja Javorik, and a song in Macedonian, "Pesna protiv maleri", recorded in studio for the theatre play Kutrite mali hrčki by Skopje Drama Theatre.

== Track listing ==
1. "Godine prolaze" - 4:29
2. "Najave" - 1:45
3. "Gospod brine" - 6:16
4. "Plavi safir" - 5:08
5. "Grad" – 4:53
6. "Na vrhovima prstiju" - 4:08
7. "Tišina" - 7:03
8. "Vesela pesma" - 3:52
9. "442 do Beograda" - 5:18
10. "Ruski voz" - 5:11
11. "Otkada tebe volim" - 5:21
12. "Da li da odem ili ne" - 3:25
13. "Ti se ljubiš (Na tako dobar način)" - 4:22
14. "Slovenačka reč" - 4:15
15. "Pesna protiv maleri" - 4:06

== Personnel ==
- Momčilo Bajagić - vocals, guitar
- Žika Milenković - vocals, guitar
- Miroslav Cvetković - bass guitar
- Saša Lokner - keyboards
- Ljubiša Opačić - guitar
- Čeda Macura - drums
