= Katarina Ivanović =

Serbian artist (1811–1882)

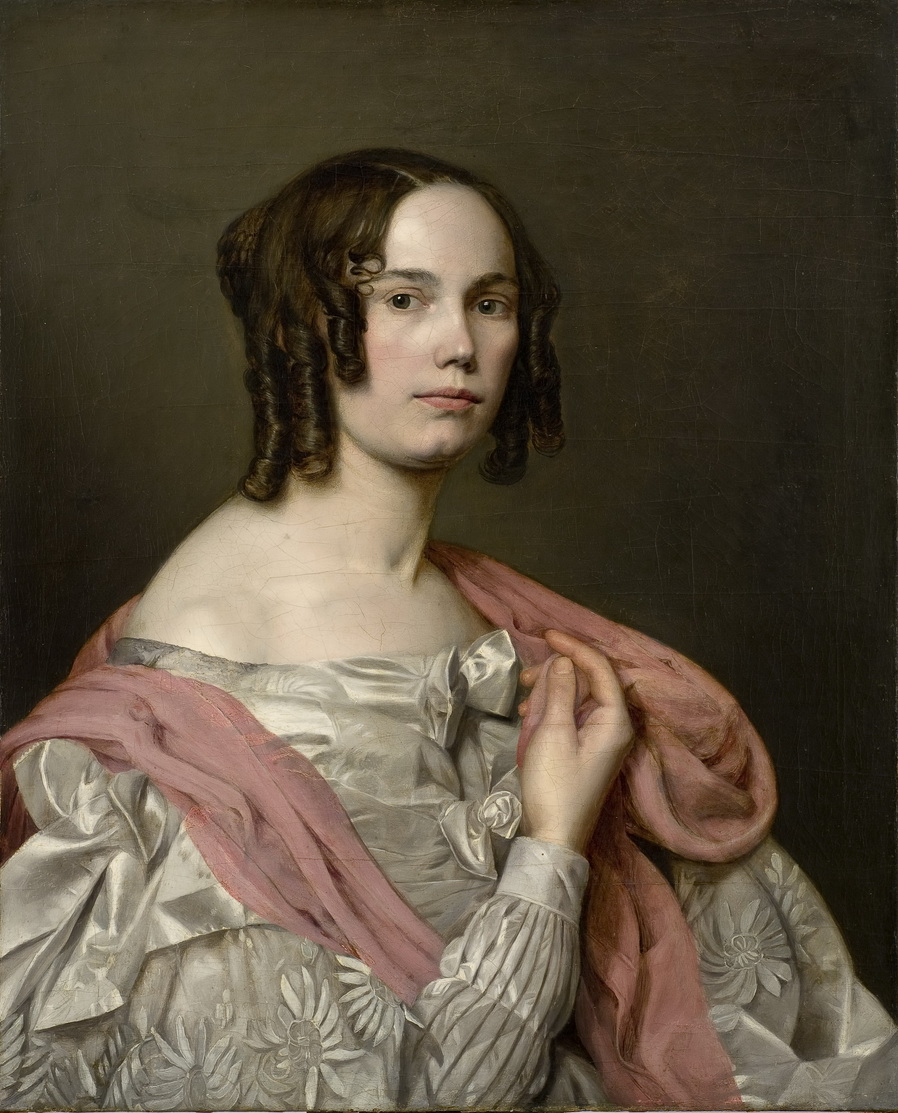
- Self-portrait by Katarina Ivanović, National Museum of Serbia
- Born: 15 April 1811; Veszprém, Austrian Empire
- Died: 22 September 1882 (aged 71); Székesfehérvár, Austria-Hungary
- Occupation: Painter

Katarina Ivanović (15 April 1811 – 22 September 1882) was a Serbian painter from the Austrian Empire. She is regarded as the first Serbian female painter in modern art history.

== Biography ==
Ivanović was born in Veszprém in the Austrian Empire to a middle-class family, and grew up in Székesfehérvár. She initially studied painting in Budapest and enrolled in the Academy of Fine Arts in Vienna in 1835. Her friends and supporters included Teodor Pavlović, who wrote about her in Serbski Narodni List, and Sima Milutinović, who devoted a poem to her in 1837.

Ivanović traveled to Italy, France and Holland, and studied at the Academy of Fine Arts in Munich between 1843 and 1845. She worked in Belgrade from 1846 to 1847, where she painted portraits of notable people of the era, including Princess Persida Nenadović and Voivode Stevan Knićanin. In later years, she spent a lot of time traveling and living at different places, including Paris and Zagreb. Ivanović returned and died in Székesfehérvár in 1882. Her remains were transferred to Belgrade New Cemetery in 1967.

== Work and legacy ==
She brought new themes to Serbian painting: Genre art and still life. She was stylistically in between the ideas of Biedermeier and Romanticism; she tried her hand at painting historical compositions but had her greatest achievements as a portrait painter. Of special note are her self-portraits. As the first educated Serbian painter, in February 1876 she became the first woman member of the Serbian Learned Society and one of the founders of the National Museum in Belgrade.

Ivanović bequeathed most of her paintings to the National Museum, where they were transferred after her death. Her work known to date consists of 48 paintings, ten of which have been lost.

== Gallery ==
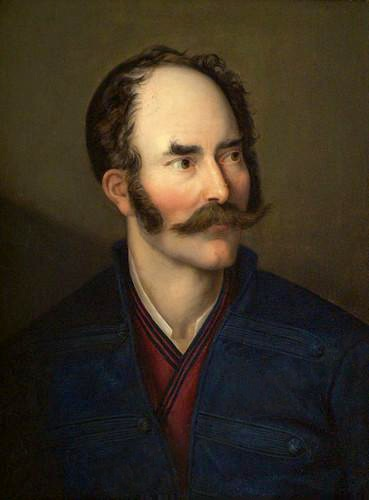
Sima Milutinović Sarajlija (1840)

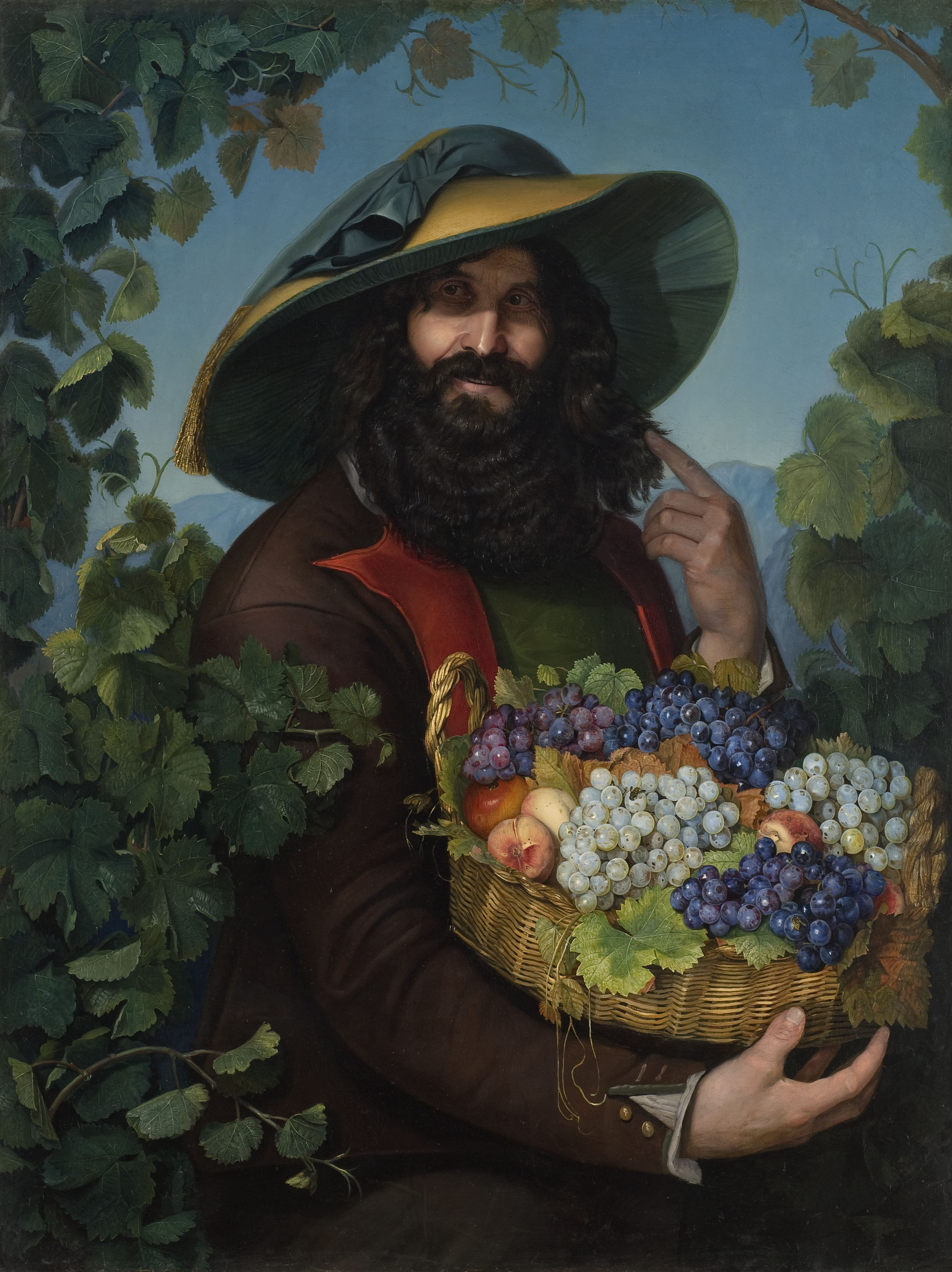
Italian winemaker (1842)

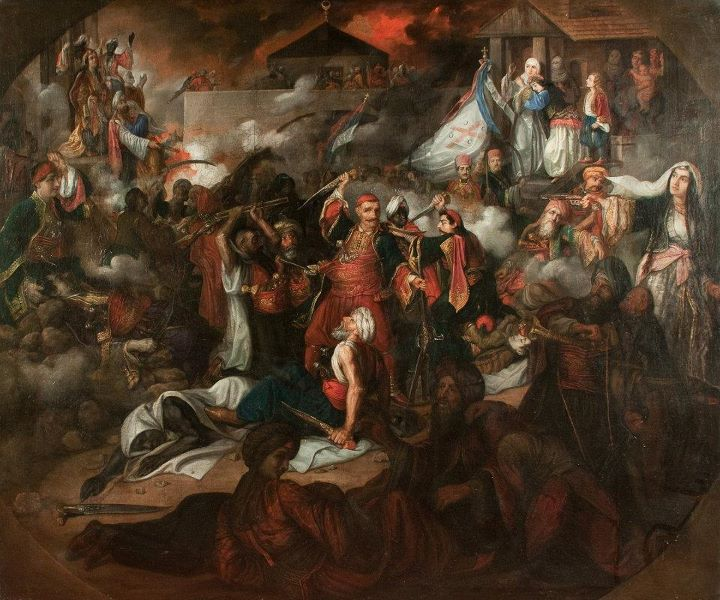
The Conquest of Belgrade (1844–45)

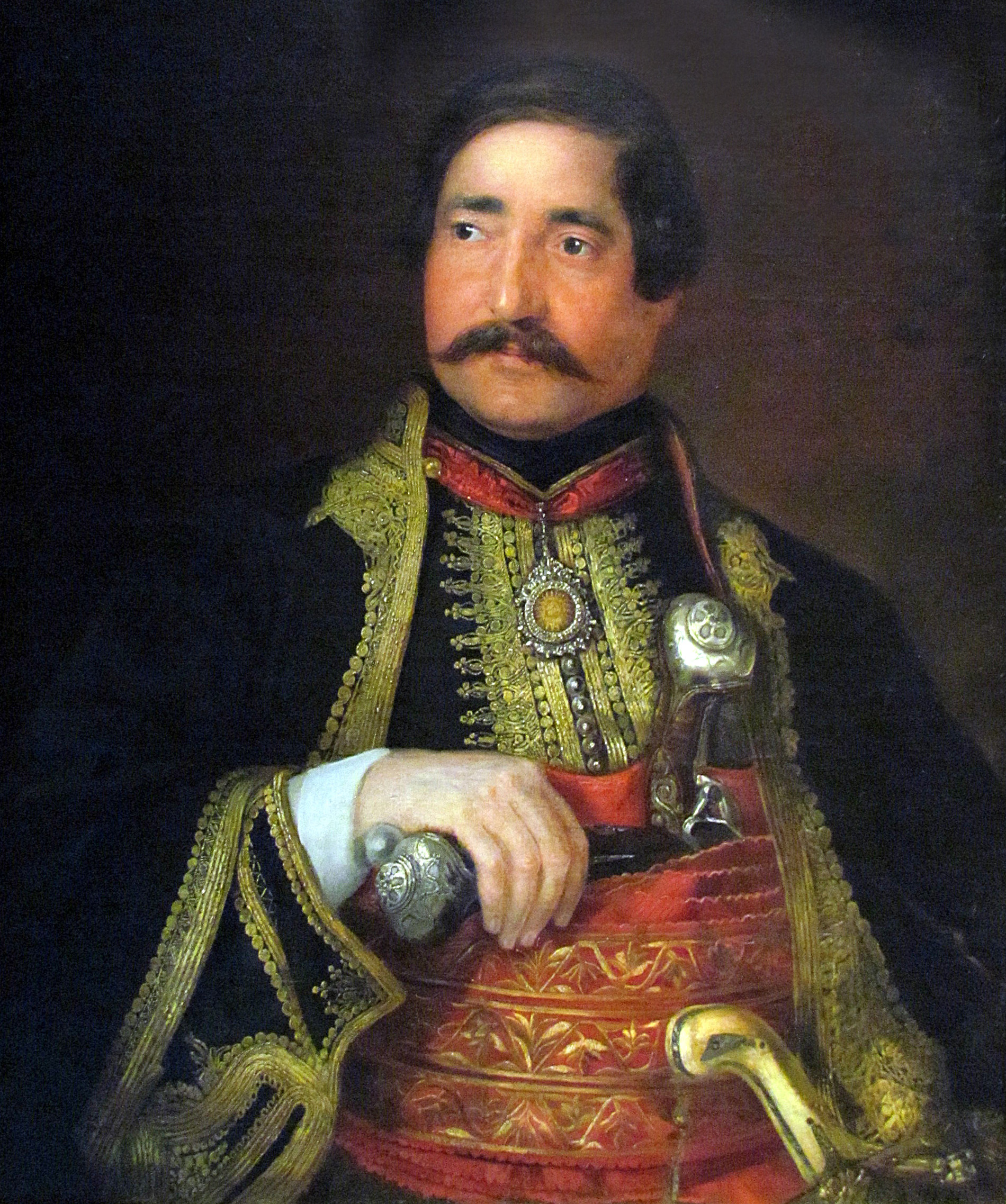
Stevan Knićanin (1847)

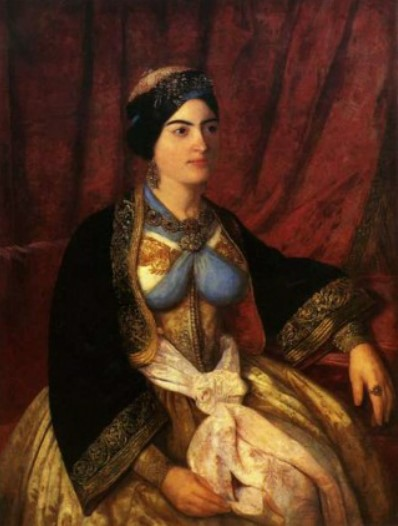
Persida Nenadović-Karadjordjević (1847)

== See also ==
- List of painters from Serbia
- Serbian art
- Konstantin Danil
- Nikola Aleksić
- Đura Jakšić
- Novak Radonić
- Stevan Todorović
