= Brajkovac, Kruševac =

Coordinates: 43°38′28″N 21°11′50″E

Brajkovac (Kruševac)
- Village
- Interactive map of Brajkovac (Kruševac)
- Country: Serbia
- District: Rasina District
- Municipality: Kruševac

Population (2002)
  - Total: 367
- Time zone: UTC+1 (CET)
  - Summer (DST): UTC+2 (CEST)

Brajkovac is a village in the municipality of Kruševac, Serbia. As of the 2002 census, the village had a population of 367 people.
