= Stambol Gate =

Former city gate of Belgrade

Coordinates: 44°48′59″N 20°27′37″E

- Стамбол капија
- Belgrade; Serbia
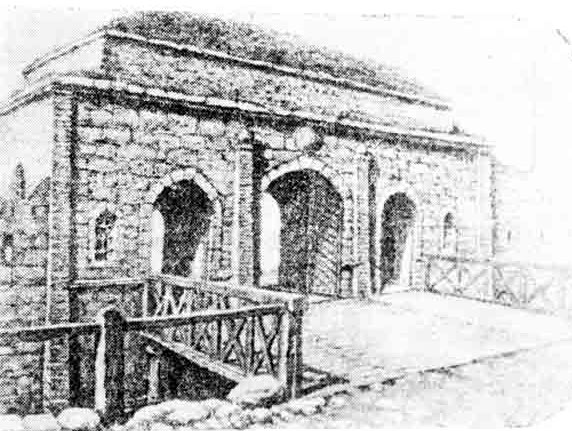
- The Stambol Gate as seen by Felix Philipp Kanitz

Site information
- Type: City gate
- Condition: Demolished in 1866

Site history
- Built: Habsburg Era
- Built by: Habsburg monarchy
- Materials: Hewn stone, brick

The Stambol Gate (Serbian Cyrillic: Стамбол капија, romanized: Stambol kapija) was one of the four former city gates of Belgrade, the capital of Serbia, which allowed access to the city.

== History ==
The Stambol Gate was the main gate of Belgrade on the Tsarigrad Road to Constantinople (present-day Istanbul), hence the derivation of the Serbian name (Stambol is the Serbian name for Istanbul). In the 18th and 19th centuries, Belgrade stretched between the rivers Sava and Danube and was protected by a deep ditch and palisades. Located in front of Kalemegdan, the actual city of Belgrade, it included the present-day urban neighbourhoods of Savski Venac, Stari grad and Dorćol.

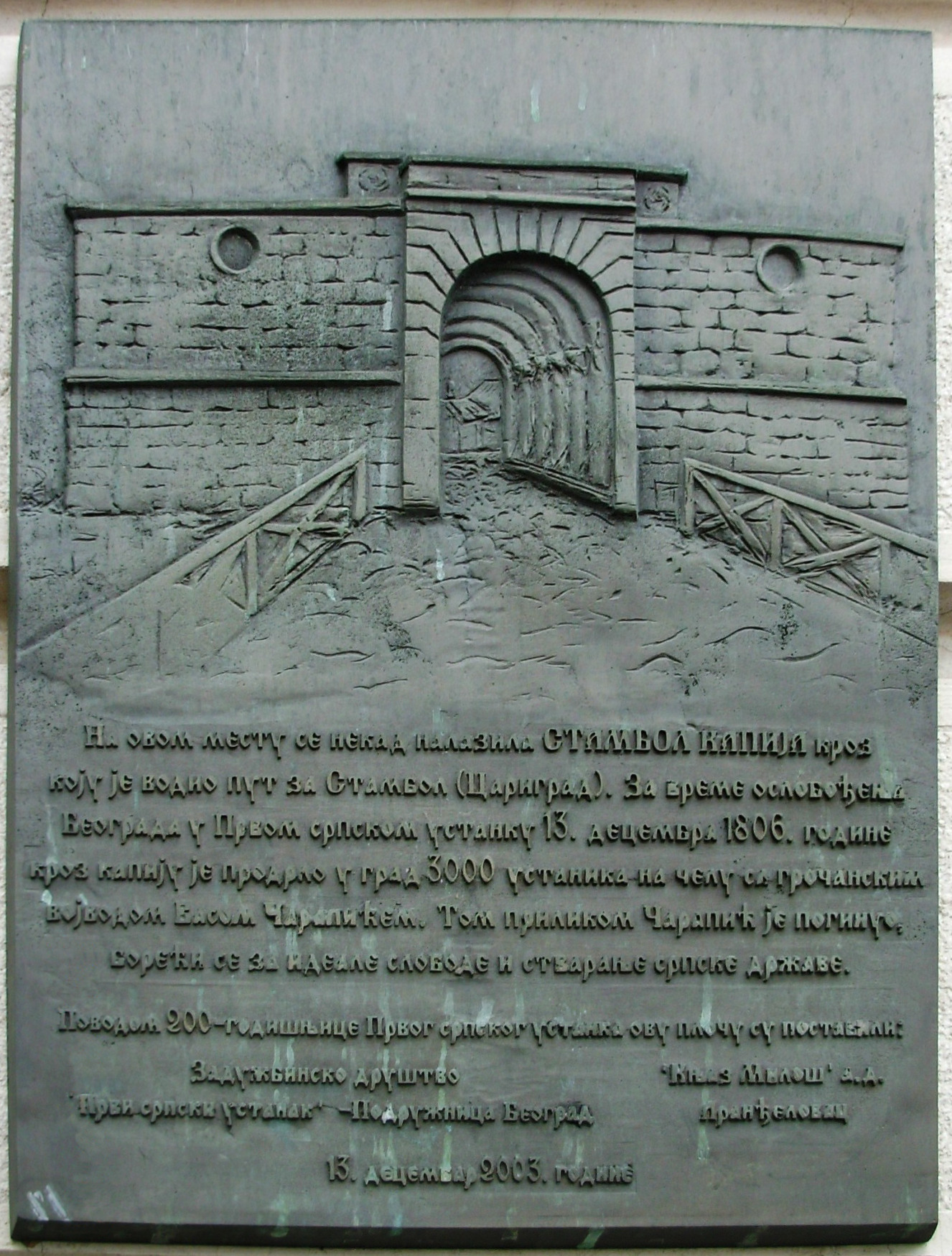
Plaque at the location of the Stambol Gate (on the wall of the National Theatre)

The Stambol Gate stood on the square in front of the present-day National Theatre, near the present monument to Prince Mihailo Obrenović on the present Republic Square in the city centre. Of all the gates of the city wall, the Stambol Gate was the best fortified.

The gate was built by the Austrians during the occupation from 1718 to 1739 and was originally called the Württemberg Gate after the governor Charles Alexander of Württemberg. It stood in front of a simple green area where two paths forked to the Terazije and Tašmajdan. Since rebellious Serbs were publicly impaled on the stakes at the Stambol Gate during the Ottoman rule, this gate was so hated that it was demolished in April–May 1866 by decree of Prince Mihailo.

The gate had three entrances, of which the middle one was the largest and was passable for carts. When Feldmarschall Ernst Gideon von Laudon captured Belgrade for the Austrians in 1789, he removed the plaque of Sultan Mehmed I that was there and brought it to Vienna, where it still adorns his grave in the Vienna Woods today, along with other military plaques.

In 1806, during the capture of Belgrade by the Serbian revolutionaries in the First Serbian Uprising, Vasa Čarapić, one of the leaders of the uprising, died at the Stambol Gate. In memory of this, there is a monument on the spot where he died and one of the surrounding streets bears his name.

== See also ==
- Gates of Belgrade
