= Ruža vetrova Beograda =

Compilation album by Bajaga i Instruktori
- Released: 2003
- Recorded: 1983–2003
- Genre: Pop rock
- Label: Hi-Fi Centar
- Producer: Various

Bajaga i Instruktori chronology
Best of Live (2002)	Ruža vetrova Beograda (2003)	Šou počinje u ponoć (2005)

Ruža vetrova Beograda (trans. Belgrade Wind Rose) is a compilation album from Serbian rock Bajaga i Instruktori, released in 2003.

The album, after the idea of journalist Peca Popović, features the band's songs inspired by the city of Belgrade. The compilation features two previously unreleased songs, "Novosti" ("The News") and "Ruža vetrova", as well as a remix of the latter.

== Track listing ==
1. "Ruža vetrova" - 4:42
2. "Ovo je Balkan" - 3:03
3. "Grudi nosi k'o odlikovanja" - 3:25
4. "Zmaj od Noćaja" - 5:44
5. "Pustite me druže" - 2:40
6. "Papaline" - 2:01
7. "Red i mir" - 2:57
8. "442 do Beograda" - 4:41
9. "Zvezda" - 4:15
10. "Ruski voz" - 4:16
11. "Što ne može niko možeš ti" - 5:10
12. "Grad" - 3:51
13. "Dobro jutro, džezeri" - 3:06
14. "Novosti" - 3:51
15. "Ruža vetrova (Urban Remix)" - 4:04
