= Uzun-Mirko =

Serbian military leader (1782 – 1868)

Uzun-Mirko Apostolović
- Узун-Мирко Апостоловић
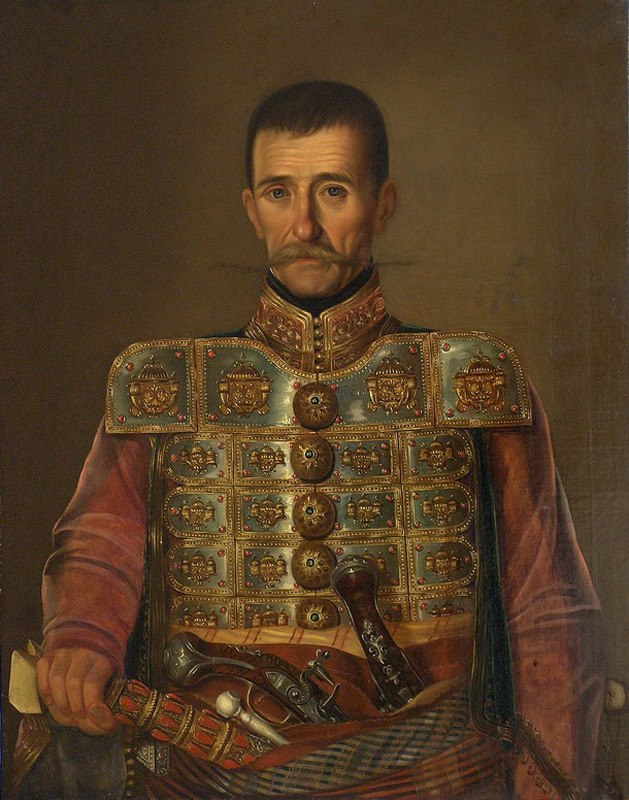
- Portrait by Uroš Knežević (c. 1855)
- Born: 1782; Brajkovac, Ottoman Empire (now Serbia)
- Died: 1868 (aged 85–86); Belgrade, Principality of Serbia
- Military career
- Allegiance: (Serbia) Serbian revolutionaries (1804-1817)
- Service years: 1804 - 1817
- Rank: bimbaša, buljubaša
- Nickname: Uzun-Mirko (Tall Mirko)
- Conflicts: First Serbian Uprising (1804-1813); Hadži Prodan's Revolt (1814); Second Serbian Uprising (1815-1817)

Mirko Apostolović, known as Uzun-Mirko (Serbian: Узун-Мирко Апостоловић; 1782 – 1868) was a Serbian voivode (military commander), with the rank of bimbaša during the Serbian revolution; he took part in both the First and Second Serbian Uprising. He was famed for his many wounds, undetected infiltration into the Ottoman fort at Belgrade, among other operations, which gained him many awards. He is the founder of the Uzun-Mirković family.

== Life ==
Mirko was born in 1782, in Brajkovac (then Smrdljikovac), near Lazarevac. His family were of the Piperi, and settled first in Rudnik, they then moved to Belgrade, and during the Austrian-Turkish War they lived in Srem. His father Petar Apostolović and grandfather Apostol died in the Austrian-Turkish War in 1792. They fought in Kočina Krajina, in the Austrian Freikorps against the Ottoman Turks. At the return from Srem, Mirko and his mother lived in Mislođin, then he moved to Belgrade, where he learned to be a tailor. He received his nickname 'Uzun' from his height, the Turkish word for tall.

Uzun-Mirko reached fame when he participated in the Battle of Belgrade that took place from November 29 to December 12, 1806, when he together with his band and bimbaša Konda, a former mercenary commander serving the Ottomans in Belgrade, entered undetected in the city and from the interior opened the Sava Gate for the Serbian Army. He was seriously wounded during the fighting. He was wounded; in the head in Karanovac (1805, modern Kraljevo), in his left side in Paraćin (1805), in the shoulder in Smederevo (1805), in the right hand caused by knife in Sava (1806), in the hip in Užice (1805 or 1807), in the breast in Malajnica (1807), over the thighs caused by saber in Drina (1810). After the First Serbian Uprising, he rehabilitated in Wien. He also participated in the Second Serbian Uprising, in the battles of Lipar, Čačak and Dublje. When he sought a pension from the Sovjet (Serbian government) in 1842, they asked him for documents, upon which he answered "my documents are my 7 wounds!".

Uzun-Mirko was, like other elders, connected to the Church and obeyed the laws; he had a space in his house on the upper floor, where he every morning and evening prayed in front of icons. According to contemporaries, he prayed loudly, "so that it could be heard outside".

On May 21, 1865, for the 50-year-anniversary of the Second Uprising, Mihailo Obrenović III, Prince of Serbia, personally brought the Takovo cross for Uzun-Mirko, and also awarded him with the Montenegrin golden medallion of Obilić (as a Hero). He died in 1868, and was buried in Belgrade, his grave is situated in the Novo Groblje in Belgrade.

Uzun-Mirko is the founder of the Uzun-Mirković family. His son was Infantry colonel Ljubomir Uzun-Mirković (1832–1905), he in turn had a son, Division general Dragoljub Uzun-Mirković (1875–1941), who in turn had a son, Artillery captain Miroslav Uzun-Mirković (1941). His maternal cousin was Division general Dragutin Đ. Okanović, who in 1906 as a member of the Black Hand, founded "Novi pokret".

== See also ==
- List of Serbian Revolutionaries

== Sources ==
- Milićević, Milan Đ. (1888). Поменик знаменитих људи у српског народа новијега доба. Издање Чупићеве задужбине – via Archive.org.
- Nenadović, Konstantin N. (1884). Живот и дела великог Ђорђа Петровића Кара-Ђорђа. Vol. II (1 ed.). Vienna: У Штампарији Јована Н. Вернаја – via Google Books.
- Nikić, Ljubomir (1957). "Лик Узун-Мирка Апостоловића" (PDF). ГОДИШЊАК. IV. Музеј града Београда: 177–180.
