= Gitarijada (Belgrade) =

Musical festival in Belgrade, Serbia

- Siluete performing at the 1967 Gitarijada festival
- Genre: Rock
- Locations: Belgrade, SR Serbia, SFR Yugoslavia
- Years active: 1966 – 1967
- Founders: TV novosti, Večernje novosti, PGP-RTB

Gitarijada (Serbian Cyrillic: Гитаријада, lit. 'Guitar Fest') was a musical festival held in Belgrade, Serbia, at the time part of Socialist Federal Republic of Yugoslavia. The first edition of the festival was held in 1966, and second and the last in 1967. The festival was one of the first rock festivals in Yugoslavia and considered one of the most notable events in the early days of Yugoslav rock music.

== History ==
=== Background ===
During the 1960s the Non-Aligned Yugoslavia was more opened and welcoming towards Western culture than other socialist countries in Europe. Prior to the first edition of the festival, rock music had already seen large popularity with the Yugoslav youth and found its way to the Yugoslav media. At the beginning of the 1960s, first Yugoslav rock bands were formed, and prior to the first edition of Gitarijada some of them, like Atomi, Bijele Strijele, Crveni Koralji, Iskre and Elipse had already published their first EPs. In 1961 the radio show Sastanak u 9 i 5 (The Meeting at 9:05), dedicated to rock and roll, started airing on Radio Belgrade, and in 1962, the music magazine Ritam, dedicated to jazz and contemporary popular music, was established. The series of concerts named Parada ritma (Parade of Rhythm), held in 1964 and featuring Yugoslav rock bands, are considered the first rock festival in Yugoslavia and perhaps the first rock festival in a communist country. However, it was Gitarijada festival that turned the eyes of the entire Yugoslav public towards rock music and revealed the level popularity that rock enjoyed among the Yugoslav youth.

=== 1966 ===
The first edition of the festival, envisioned as a competition of rock bands, was organized by the magazine TV novosti (TV News), the newspaper Večernje novosti and the record label PGP-RTB. The festival's slogan was: "TV novosti daju šansu električarima" ("TV novosti Offer a Chance to Electric Bands"). More than 100 bands from all parts of Yugoslavia applied for the partaking, 56 of them being chosen to perform on Gitarijada. The festival was held in Hall 1 of the Belgrade Fair. It included three dates: the first semi-final evening was on January 6, the second semi-final evening on January 9, and the final evening on February 13. The jury consisted of Stevan Markićević (the musical editor of Radio Belgrade), Borivoje Pavlović (Radio Belgrade journalist), Mladen Maslić (musician), Danilo Vasić (musician), Aleksandar Vujisić (musician), Jovan Popaz (musician) and Dragan Jelasić (boxer). During the festival, present in the audience were some notable public figures of the time: professor at Military Medical Academy and correspondent member of the Serbian Academy of Science and Arts Izidor Papo, politician, writer, and political theorist Dobrica Ćosić, composer and conductor Mihailo Vukdragović, film director Dušan Makavejev, actresses Milena Dravić and Rada Đuričin, singer Đorđe Marjanović and others.

The first eight finalists were, ranked by the jury in the following order: Bele Višnje, Siluete, Indexi, Rubinsi, Iskre, Beduini, Dinamiti and Tomi Sovilj i Njegove Siluete. More than 5,000 people attended the first evening of the festival, a large part of them carrying banners with messages of support for their favorite bands. On the second semi-final evening, also attended by several thousands spectators, the jury chose eight other bands, ranking them in the following order: Elipse, Bomiko, Veseli Dečaci, Idoli, Plavi Dečaci, Smeli, Plamenih 5, Kristali. In the finals, attended by about 15,000 people, the jury chose eight bands as the best, ranking them in the following order: Elipse, Siluete, Plamenih 5, Indexi, Iskre, Smeli, Bele Višnje, Plavi Dečaci, Veseli Dečaci, Rubinsi. The audience got the chance to vote for the best band, polling Siluete.

On March 3, in Belgrade Youth Center, an exhibition of photographs from the festival by well-known photographer Tomislav Peternek was opened. The exhibition was entitled Koncert od 100 fotografja (The 100 Photographs Concert).

==== Reactions ====
As one of the first rock festivals and one of the first large rock concerts in Yugoslavia, Gitarijada caused analysis by the authorities and various reactions of the public.

The Central Committee of the League of Communists of Serbia discussed the festival, but decided to transfer the whole issue to the Central Committee of the League of Socialist Youth of Serbia, which, for their part, decided the issue is in the jurisdiction of the Belgrade City Committee of the League of Socialist Youth of Serbia. The City Committee demonstrated understanding for young rock musicians and fans. Its analysis stated that "for some, this [purely] musical question is — a question about the fate of socialism". It also stated:

Unfortunately, low democratic culture of a great number of our citizens results in the fact that in our country there are also people who could join the Chinese 'Cultural Revolution'.

The TV stations broadcast footage from Gitarijada, including scenes of boys taking off their shirts and waving them high above their heads and girls dancing ecstatically. The newspaper Politika wrote:

Fans of 'electric' music expressed their likes screaming, with the help of various rattles, horns, sirens, throwing their coats, caps, purses and anything else that was in their hands.

A text in the magazine Ilustrovana Politika claimed that a part of young people were persuaded, or even paid by film director Dušan Makavejev, who wanted to make footage for one of his films, to act ecstatically, and that he gave them rattles, whistles, wigs and other props.

Politika, during the 1960s mostly favorable towards Western culture, criticized Gitarijada, describing it as "mass circus" and "mindless howling", describing the long hair of the young rockers as "bird's nests" and "young chimps saved from drowning" and the singing of the vocalists as "elephants' mating call". Dr. Aleksandar Kostić, in the text "Naši domaći Bitlsi" ("Our Own Beatles"), published in the magazine NIN, criticized the new form of entertainment:

If we view these phenomenons as an aspiration to return to earlier stages of evolution, even as a temporary aspiration, it does not mean that we should not oppose them in the same way we resist other primitive urges. Proofs that the appearance of the 'Beatles' and their stunts is imported from the West are unnecessary. Not to equivocate: they are not only a product of the West, but they are also a decadent, uncomely, worthless and harmful product, the import of which should come neither through the front nor through the back door. [...] The growing number of our young people gives away to foreign eccentricity. One who attended guitar fests, organized, unfortunately, by those who should provide other, healthier form of pastime and entertainment for the youth, has to admit that those shows were a true and faithful copy of that sort of shows in other countries. Thousands of young people partied for ten hours without stopping, listening to the monotonous music of the famous Beatles, nodding their heads tirelessly, waving their long hair, twisting their bodies furiously, wringing and intertwining their legs, screaming and falling into trans, the trans which also caught the ones that were watching them, as a mass hysteria, all of that followed by the sounds of the 'yeah-yeah' symphony!

The literary magazine Književne novine criticized Večernje novosti as the organizers of the festival:

It will become clear that in this historical period, in this country, the press, or at least a part of it, does not have the function it usually had throughout history: primarily, to inform its readers about the things which are happening around them and in the rest of the world. One part of the press dedicated itself to a more 'noble' cause: to gathering hairy and masked makers of noise, which is produced with the help of appliances resembling the musical instrument called the guitar and the electric energy, gathering those young men in one place, giving them an opportunity to compete in this business, and awarding and helping the chosen ones among them. The purpose is obvious: to stimulate and propagate this sort of noise as something useful for the society, to give it a halo of art which should be admired and which should be discussed.

On the other hand, the newspaper Borba, the official newspaper of the League of Communists of Yugoslavia, defended young rockers in the article entitled "Savremene babaroge" ("Contemporary Bogeymen"):

It is unfortunate that the negative view is created by watching marginal details, usually the clothing and the way of entertainment, so one gets the impression that the hair and the clothes are enough for judging the youth, ignoring, at the same time, their life aspirations. After the things that reached the public after the 'Guitar Fest', the contact with the 'hairy ones' who were anathematized as social monsters promised a lot of things - except for what it really brought. It became clear, however, that in tight trousers and short boots live young men who stand firmly on their feet, and that their long hair does not cover empty heads.

Mladost, an official newspaper of the League of Communist Youth of Yugoslavia, published an article with a similar view:

Can we, in a self-managing society, which rejects imposing, determine beauty and entertainment and beauty of entertainment? Don't we soothe our conscience with superficial criticism of young people for everything that we failed to do between the appearance of rock and roll and hula hoop, between the appearance of twist and electric guitar music? Isn't that sort of criticism a bad habit behind which we hide our infirmity and our lack of concern for real aspirations and abilities of the youth, eventually our infirmity and our lack of concern for the youth's pastime and entertainment?

Other magazines that defended the performers and the audience included Ilustrovana Politika and economical magazine Ekonomska politika. The magazine Duga conducted a questionnaire entitled "Gitarijada: da ili ne" ("Guitar Fest: Yes or No"). The people asked for opinion included experts from various fields: university professors, neuropsychiatrists, magistrates, most of them rejecting the idea of rock music being harmful for the youth and the society.

Only a small a number of reactions concerned the actual quality of the bands' performances. The music magazine Džuboks criticized most of the vocalists, stating that the members of only several bands sang perfectly.

=== 1967 ===
The second edition of the festival was held in Belgrade Fair – Hall 1 on January 23, 1967. More than one hundred bands applied for the partaking, with about thirty of them selected. More than 13,000 spectators attended the event. The jury pronounced Crni Biseri, Delfini and Siluete the best bands respectively, while the audience polled Plavi Dečaci, Džentlmeni and Vesnici the best. The bands Elipse, Siluete and Plamenih 5 performed in the non-competitive part, as the winners of the previous Gitarijada.

== Legacy ==
The first edition of Belgrade Gitarijada is considered one of the milestones in the history of Yugoslav rock music and Yugoslav culture in general. Although a large number of bands performed, released records and had radio and television appearances in the years before Gitarijada, although rock concerts and rock festivals were organized prior to this festival, Gitarijada is considered the event which revealed how large the popularity of rock music among the youth was, and that rock music is not just a fad among young people of Yugoslavia. It was after the first Belgrade Gitarijada that a rock band performed for Yugoslav president Josip Broz Tito for the first time: it was the winner of Gitarijada, Elipse, on May 24, 1966. On this day Elipse performed in the Belgrade Youth Center in front of Josip Broz Tito and the first lady of Yugoslavia, Jovanka Broz.

Authors Željko Fajfrić and Milan Nenad, in the book Istorija YU rock muzike od početaka do 1970. (History of Yugoslav Rock Music from Its Beginning to 1970) wrote: "Up until then, it [rock music] was maybe a caprice, maybe who-knows-what, but always only a fad, and now, after this Gitarijada, it was something else, it was a part of the society, a part which could be marginalized, but not forgotten." Historian Aleksandar Raković stated that before 1966 rock music in Yugoslavia "ensured itself with 'citizenship', being tolerated in every way", but that Gitarijada represents the point in which "the phenomenon of rock and roll was fully understood, and the structures of the [Communist] Party and youth organizations got the task to study it from a professional point". In her book Koka-kola socijalizam (Coca-Cola Socialism) historian Radina Vučetić wrote: "The authorities were aware there is little space for the youth and its 'cultural and recreational life', and that a group of 'electric guitarists which represent a specific cultural movement' emerged. But they were not perceived as a problem which should be dealt with. The only thing that was missing was something spectacular, something which would bring the society towards the complete acceptance of rock 'n' roll. That 'spectacular' thing happened in January 1966 [...] This openness, as well as the regime's approval was, like in many other similar remissions, a good way of creating and promoting the positive image of Yugoslavia."

In 2017, Serbian news magazine Nedeljnik pronounced the 1966 Gitarijada one of 100 Events that Changed Serbia. The magazine wrote: "After that [Gitarijada], everything changed. The Party accepted young people who played rock and roll, which provoked conspiracy theorists to describe that as the desire of communist establishment to win over the youth, or to pacify them and keep them under control using rock and roll. Of course, those were all nonsense, because rock and roll was something that could not be stopped."

== See also ==
- List of historic rock festivals
