= Bele Višnje =

Background information
- Origin: Čačak, SR Serbia, SFR Yugoslavia
- Genres: Rock and roll; beat music; rock; folk rock
- Years active: 1962–1973; 1990–1994; 2010
- Labels: Diskoton, Zvuci Galaksije
- Past members: Aleksandar Slaviković; Ljubodrag Jovanović; Zoran Sokić; Mišo Ilić; Dragan Maksimović; Slobodan Pajić; Muhamed Hukić; Stevo Radović; Predrag Radonjić; Miki Vukadinović; Slobodan Rabrenović; Jovan Matijašević; Vladimir Šunjevarić; Zoran Branković

Bele Višnje (Serbian Cyrillic: Беле Вишње, transl. The White Sour Cherries) was a Serbian and Yugoslav rock band formed in Čačak in 1962, notable for being one of the pioneers of the Yugoslav rock scene. Originally active during 1962–1973 period, the band gained local popularity but did not release any material during their original run. In the early 1990s, former members reunited, recording a studio album featuring their 1960s songs.

== History ==
=== 1962–1973 ===
Bele Višnje were formed in Čačak in the autumn of 1962 by Aleksandar Slaviković "Gušter" (guitar), Ljubodrag Jovanović "Borovac" (bass guitar), Zoran Sokić "Sole" (keyboards), Mišo Ilić (rhythm guitar), Dragan Maksimović (drums), Slobodan Pajić "Pajo" (vocals) and Muhamed Hukić "Hujo" (vocals). In the second half of 1963, Ilić was replaced by Stevo Radović (rhythm guitar, vocals), Maksimović was replaced by Predrag Radonjić, and Sokić switched from keyboards to bass guitar. This would become the band's most successful lineup. Prior to the arrival of Radović, the band performed covers only, mostly of songs by Little Richard, The Shadows and The Beatles, and after Radović joined the band, they started working on their own songs, mostly composed by him. During their initial years, Bele Višnje performed regularly on dances in Čačak and nearby cities, holding regular Thursday dances in Učiteljski dom hall in Čačak.

On 8 March 1964, the band performed, alongside the band Iskre, singer Miki Jevremović, actor Mija Aleksić and Boris Radak's ballet company, on the celebration of Fifth Belgrade Gymnasium anniversary. On the first Belgrade Gitarijada festival, held on 9 January 1966, the band performed first, starting their performance with a cover of the folk song "Crne oči, curo, imaš" ("You Have Dark Eyes, Girl"). On the festival the band won the seventh place, which gave them an opportunity to perform at larger concerts. In the autumn of 1966, Sokić and Pajić left the band, deciding to dedicate themselves to their studies. During 1966, the band started to perform the song "Plavokosa" ("Blond Haired Girl"), which saw success with the audience. Several years later, the song was recorded—under a slightly different title, "Plavuša"—by singer Kićo Slabinac, who had served the army with Radović in Titograd and achieved nationwide popularity with the song. With the new bass guitarist, Miki Vukadinović, Bele Višnje performed on the second Belgrade Gitarijada festival, held on 23 January 1967. The band performed a cover of the Bosnian folk song "Moj dilbere" ("My Darling") and the song "Tango" and won the third place.

During the following years, the lineup changed several more times; Slobodan Rabrenović (guitar), Jovan Matijašević (bass guitar), Vladimir Šunjevarić (guitar) and Zoran Branković (bass guitar) passed through the band. The group ended their activity at the end of 1973. The following year, Radović recorded the 7-inch single with the songs "Čips hit" ("Chips Hit") and "Čarobne oči" ("Magical Eyes"), releasing it under the name Bele Višnje through Diskoton.

=== Post-breakup ===
After he left Bele Višnje, Slaviković performed with the bands Studenti (The Students), Plamenih 5 and San. In the 1970s, he performed as a member of Đorđe Marjanović's and Miki Jevremović's backing bands, performing on several of their Soviet Union tours. In 1980, he withdrew from the scene. He died Belgrade on 23 October 2017.

During the 1970s, Zoran Branković performed with the rock bands Vatra (Fire), Krvna Grupa (Blood Type) and folk groups O đila and Novi Spomenari (The New Scrapbooks). He has recorded three ethnic music solo albums, Brankovići s kolena na koleno (The Branković Family from One Generation to Another, 2005), Solunac (Salonica Front Veteran, 2016) and Lefterija (2023), and the children's music album Uspavanke (Lullabies, 2018). He has authored two books about rock music in Čačak, Kako je Čačak zavoleo rokenrol (How Čačak Fell in Love with Rock and Roll, 2013) and Dečaci sa Morave (The Boys from Morava, 2019), the latter about the 1960s Čačak band of the same name.

=== 1990 and 2010 reunions ===
Bele Višnje reunited in 1990 in lineup featuring Stevo Radović (rhythm guitar, vocals), Vladimir Šunjarević (guitar), Slobodan Pajić (vocals), Jovan Matijašević (bass guitar) and Predrag Radonjić (drums). As during their original run the band did not make any studio recordings, in 1994 the band, on the initiative of Smak guitarist Radomir Mihajlović "Točak", recorded their old songs, produced by Mihajlović, and released them on the audio cassette Pesme naše mladosti (Songs of Our Youth) through Zvuci Galaksije record label. The album was produced by Mihajlović. In 2005, Pesme naše mladosti was reissued on CD by the same record label.

In November 2010, the band reunited to perform on a celebration of fifty years of rock music in their hometown Čačak.

=== Post reunions ===
Radović died in Belgrade on 13 December 2017.

== Discography ==
=== Studio albums ===
- Pesme naše mladosti (1994)

=== Singles ===
- "Čips hit" / "Čarobne oči" (1973)
