= Elipse =

Yugoslav rock band

- Elipse in 1968

Background information
- Origin: Belgrade, SR Serbia, SFR Yugoslavia
- Genres: Instrumental rock; beat music; rhythm and blues; soul
- Years active: 1962–1968
- Labels: PGP-RTB, Simke Music
- Past members: Momčilo Radovanović; Radomir Dmitrović; Minja Tasić; Vladimir Furduj; Zoran Simjanović; Božidar Knežević; Kosta Ignjatović; Bojan Hreljac; Slobodan Skakić; Simeun Vuković; Aleksandar Mandić; Edi Dekeng; Nikola Zembić; Dragan Kuprijanov; Zoran Jurkić

Elipse (Serbian Cyrillic: Елипсе; trans. The Ellipses) were a Yugoslav rock band formed in Belgrade in 1962. They were one of the pioneers of the Yugoslav rock scene and one of the country's most popular bands during the 1960s.

Elipse initially performed beat music and rhythm and blues. With the arrival of vocalist Edi Dekeng, the band added a brass section and moved towards soul music. During the six years of the band's activity, they enjoyed nationwide popularity. Their releases and live performances were praised by the press, and the Yugoslav media compared their rivalry with the band Siluete to the one between The Beatles and The Rolling Stones. After the group disbanded in 1968, bass guitarist Bojan Hreljac and drummer Vladimir Furduj would join highly influential band Korni Grupa, and keyboardist Zoran Simjanović would go on to become one of the most notable composers of film music in South-Eastern Europe.

== History ==
=== The beat and rhythm and blues years (1962-1967) ===
The band was formed in 1962 by Momčilo "Moma" Radovanović (guitar), Radomir Dmitrović "Đura" (guitar) and Minja Tasić (vocals), having their first rehearsals at the Society for Culture and Arts Gradimir Mihajlović. The name Elipse was suggested by Dmitrović, after he took a mathematics exam and had a hard time solving a problem concerning an ellipse. The band had their first notable live appearance in Belgrade club Euridika on 21 June 1963. Initially, the band played mostly covers of songs by The Shadows.

In autumn of 1963, drummer Vladimir "Furda" Furduj joined the band. At the time, Furduj had very little musical experience. In the summer of 1962 in Makarska, Furduj, although never playing drums before, joined the band Siluete on stage to replace their drummer Miroslav Minić, who got sick and was unable to perform. After hearing only gossips about Furduj performing with Siluete, Elipse members invited him to join the band. Furduj brought along former Siluete keyboardist Zoran Simjanović. At the time, the lineup featured, beside Radovanović, Dmitrović, Furduj and Simjanović, Božidar Knežević (vocals), Kosta Ignjatović "Gule" (saxophone), and Bojan Hreljac (bass guitar). However, this lineup did not last long. Knežević was replaced by Slobodan "Skaka" Skakić, at the time a high school student, Dmitrović was replaced by Simeun "Simica" Vuković, and Ignjatović left the band, Elipse continuing without a saxophonist. After Skakić departed, the band decided to turn to polyphonic singing, with all the members doing vocals alongside their instrumental duties. For a while, director Aleksandar Mandić performed with the band, singing backing vocals and playing tambourine.

By the mid-1960s, the band had moved towards rhythm and blues sound, and soon started to perform as a backing band for the at-the-time popular singers Ivanka Pavlović, Đorđe Marjanović, Dragan Stojnić and Miki Jevremović. The band also performed as a studio band for the singer Miodrag Marković, on the recording of his EP featuring the songs "Predaću tugu zvezdama" ("I Will Hand My Grief to the Stars"), "Ne reci sad" ("Do Not Say Now"), "Ne, nemoj nikad plakati" ("No, Don't You Ever Cry"), and "Zaboravi me" ("Forget Me"), released by PGP-RTB in 1965.

In 1964, Elipse took part in the Vatromet ritma concert series and a large open-air concert in Zagreb's Šalata. In the summer of 1965, they were hired to perform on dances held at the Belgrade Faculty of Technology. They gained the attention of Radio Belgrade editors and got an opportunity to record several songs for Radio Belgrade. The band had become increasingly popular, with the media propagating a rivalry with Siluete. Despite their growing popularity, their record label PGP-RTB did not find it as a token for good record sales, resulting in a split EP release with the popular rock and roll singer Perica Stojančić. The EP featured Elipse and the vocal group Korali as Stojančić's backing bands, and for the B-side, Elipse recorded the instrumental tracks "Signal Evrovizije" ("Eurovision Signal") and "Plaža" ("The Beach").

In 1966, Elipse won the first place at the Gitarijada festival, held at Belgrade Fair. More than 100 bands from all parts of Yugoslavia applied for the partaking, 56 of them being chosen to perform on Gitarijada. Elipse were one of the 16 bands that entered the finals, and on the final evening on the festival, held on 13 February 1966 in front of some 15,000 people, they won the first place, with their biggest rivals Siluete ending up second. In May 1966, Elipse performed on the opening of the Belgrade Youth Center in front of Yugoslav president Josip Broz Tito and the first lady Jovanka Broz, thus becoming the first Yugoslav rock band to perform in front of Tito. During the same year, Elipse appeared at the Ponoćna zvona (Midnight Bells) festival, held in Belgrade, in front of 2,000 people, and appeared in TV shows Susreti gradova (Meeting of the Cities), Vi i Mi (You and Us) and Koncert za ludi mladi svet (Concert for Crazy Young People). For the latter they recorded a video at the Belgrade Zoo, performing a cover of the Monkees song "I'm a Believer" in front of a cage with monkeys. The media-promoted rivalry with Siluete resulted in a competition of these two bands held at the Belgrade Youth Center, where the audience was to poll the winner. The competition, consisting of a musical performance, caricature drawing and reciting poetry, was won by Elipse with 146 votes advantage.

In 1966, the band also released their second EP, featuring the songs "Pogledaj kroz prozor" ("Look Through the Window", a cover version of the song "Look Through Any Window" by The Hollies), "Reci da me voliš" ("Say that You Love Me", a cover version of The Beatles song "Tell Me What You See"), and "Maja" (a cover of Jo Van Wetter's composition "Maya de Goya"), originally entitled "Naga Maja" ("Nude Maja"), with the title changed by the record label's censors. At the end of the 1966, the magazine Susret conducted a voting for the most popular Belgrade band, with Elipse being polled the first, Zlatni Dečaci polled the second, Siluete polled the third, Crni Biseri polled the fourth and Plamenih 5 polled the fifth.

At the beginning of 1967, Elipse performed, alongside the band Bitnici, on the promotion of PGP-RTB compilation album Beat Scene Now, featuring songs of British beat bands. In April 1967, both Siluete and Elipse performed as the opening acts on The Searchers concerts in Belgrade and Zrenjanin. Soon after, guitarist Vuković left Elipse, deciding to dedicate himself to his studies of architecture.

=== The soul years (1967-1968) ===
After Vuković's departure, in the Spring of 1967, Edi Dekeng, a foreign student from Zaire, joined the group as the new vocalist. Dekeng was previously a member of the band Crni Panteri (Black Panthers), founded in Belgrade by students from Zaire. With his arrival, the band moved towards soul music, adding a brass section consisting of Nikola Zembić (trumpet), Dragan Kuprijanov (saxophone) and Zoran Jurkić (saxophone, flute). The new lineup had their first live appearance on 30 June 1967 at the Belgrade Trade Union Hall, performing as an opening act on The Hollies concert, getting positive reactions from both the audience and the press. Following the performance, the new lineup released the band's last EP, featuring the hits "Za one što na licu nose bore" ("To the Ones Who Have Wrinkles on Their Faces"), written by Vlada Kanić, and "Le Telephone" ("The Telephone"), a cover version of a song by French soul singer Nino Ferrer. The EP also featured covers of Otis Redding songs "Good to Me", entitled "Za mene dobro", and "I've Been Loving You Too Long", entitled "Voleo sam te".

On 1 August 1967, Elipse performed as an opening act for Italian singer Rita Pavone on her concert held at Tašmajdan Stadium, which was followed by two concerts in Sarajevo in front of 5,000 people on each. During 1967, Elipse appeared in Black Wave films The Naughty Ones, directed by Kokan Rakonjac, and The Rats Woke Up, directed by Živojin Pavlović. The Naughty Ones were the first Yugoslav and Balkan film to feature a performance by a rock band. The music for the film was written by composer Zoran Hristić. As he lacked experience in composing popular music, he cooperated with Simjanović on the film score.

In 1968, the band held a large concert at the Belgrade Youth Center, which was widely praised by the media. The concert featured vocalists Seka Kojadinović and Daliborka Stojšić as guests, the stage was decorated with large portraits of John Lennon, Ringo Starr, Bob Dylan, Jean Shrimpton and Twiggy and a part of the film The Naughty Ones was shown during the band's performance. In August 1968, Elipse and the band Mladi Levi from Ljubljana represented Yugoslavia at the 9th World Festival of Youth and Students in Sofia, Bulgaria. Since the two bands had similar musical directions, they decided to have a joint performance at a park situated in the city centrum. As soon as the performance had started, the audience started clapping their hands to the rhythm of the music, which provoked the police to stop the performance after ten minutes and brutally attack the audience. Despite the incident, Elipse got the Silver Medal for the second best music performance at the festival.

By the end of 1967, due to the decision of the band members to focus more on their studies, Elise disbanded.

=== Post breakup ===
After he left Elipse, in Autumn of 1967, Slobodan Skakić, with Radomir Dmitrović (guitar), Nenad Nedić (bass guitar) and Milenko Kašanin (drums), formed the band Nove Elipse (The New Ellipses). In the band Skakić sung and played the organ. Initially the band performed instrumental songs only, but later started performing covers of songs by Scott McKenzie, Tom Jones, The Mamas & the Papas and other acts. They were spotted by ballet dancer Milorad Mišković, who hired them to play on his performances. They had their first performance with Mišković in Belgrade Youth Center, and soon went with him on a tour across France. During 1969, they performed in Soviet Union, on fashion shows presenting works of fashion designer Aleksandar Joksimović. However, in Yugoslavia they did not see expected success and, in 1969, Skakić moved to England. He had been a keyboard player and vocalist in a band called Ici-la until 1987, when he had an accident in which he injured his arm. He died in Dorset in January 2019.

After the disbandment of Elipse in 1968, Furduj and Hreljac joined Korni Grupa. Dekeng went to Germany before moving to the United States, where he worked as a physician. The saxophonist Zoran Jurkić moved to Denmark where he started working in a Porsche service.

Zoran Simjanović started working as a composer, writing music for theatre and film, eventually becoming one of the most notable composers of film music in the Balkans. He wrote an autobiographical book called Kako sam postao (i prestao da budem) roker (How I Started (and Stopped) Being a Rocker), published in 2004. The promotion of the book also included a concert held on 22 November 2004, at the Belgrade Trade Union Hall, where both the Siluete and Elipse former members appeared as performers. Guest appearances also featured Seka Kojadinović, Janez Bončina and the group Valjevski Dečaci.

The Elipse material released on the EPs, along with the unreleased material, appeared on the compilation album Elipse za prijatelje (1963-1968) (Elipse for Friends), released by Simjanović through his own independent record label Simke Music in 1999.

Momčilo Radovanović died on 6 January 2012. Furduj died on 1 June 2015. Bojan Hreljac died on 18 December 2018. Simjanović died on 11 April 2021.

== Discography ==
=== Extended plays ===
- Sentimental Baby / Plaža (split EP with Perica Stojančić; 1965)
- Pogledaj kroz prozor (1966)
- Le Telelphone (1967)

=== Compilation albums ===
- Elipse za prijatelje (1963-1968) (1999)
