= Crveni Koralji =

Croatian and Yugoslav rock band (1962–2006)

Background information
- Origin: Zagreb, Croatia
- Genres: Rock and roll; instrumental rock; beat music; rock
- Years active: 1962–2006
- Labels: PGP-RTB, Jugoton, Benelux International, Mam – Vin, Memphis, Croatia Records
- Past members: Jelenko Miran Perković; Miroslav Lukačić; Rudolf Šimunec; Davorin Sarajlić; Josip Badrić; Boris Babarović; Mika Hižak; Boris Turina; Boris Kajzer; Alfons Vučer; Krešo Pavlić; Vlado Bastajić; Marijan Miše; Marjan Štupjanski; Željko Marinac; Zvonko Gorički; Vlatko Medetski

Crveni Koralji (trans. The Red Corals) were a Croatian and Yugoslav rock band formed in Zagreb in 1962, notable as one of the pioneers of the Yugoslav rock scene.

Crveni Koralji were initially inspired mainly by Cliff Richard and the Shadows, but soon included covers of songs by other acts into their repertoire, as well as their own songs. With their performances and early releases, the band gained nationwide popularity, and by the mid-1960s became the most popular Yugoslav rock group. In the second half of the decade, with the arrival of new musical trends on the Yugoslav rock scene, their popularity heavily declined and since the mid-1970s the band, although never officially disbanding, performed occasionally only. The group continued their activity in mid-1980s, releasing three studio albums by the end of the decade. Since the beginning of the 1990s, the band has made occasional reunions to perform live and work in studio, releasing their last studio album in 2006.

== History ==
=== 1960s and 1970s: Formation, rise to fame and decline ===
Crveni Koralji were formed in late 1962 by Jelenko Miran Perković (vocals), Miroslav Lukačić (guitar), Rudolf Šimunec (rhythm guitar), Davorin "Dino" Sarajlić (bass guitar) and Josip "Medo" Badrić (drums). Originally, they wanted to name the band Crveni Đavoli (The Red Devils), but eventually opted for Crveni Koralji, fearing that the name Crveni Đavoli might seem as a political provocation. Several months after the formation, the band's new vocalist became Boris Babarović "Barba", Perković moving to the band Kon-Tiki. Crveni Koralji had their debut performance on 28 March 1963 in the Zagreb club Varijete. Initially, they played covers of international hits, mostly of songs by Cliff Richard and the Shadows, performing at dances at the Zagreb club Polet. The band got larger media attention after their performance at a concert in Trade Union Hall in Belgrade, on which they performed alongside bands Bijele Strijele, Zlatni Dečaci and Elipse. Crveni Koralji started their performance with their backs turned to the audience, performing the Shadows song "Shadoogie". By the end of the year, Crveni Koralji had several appearances on television and recorded the songs "Vinetu" ("Winnetou") and "Niz cestu" ("Down the Road") for Radio Zagreb.

In May 1964, Crveni Koralji performed at the Vatromet ritma (Fireworks of Rhythm) festival, held in Hall 3 of the Belgrade Fair, alongside Safiri, Nautilus, Zlatni Dečaci, Lutalice, Iskre, Elipse and Sadžo. This event is considered the first large rock concert held in Yugoslavia, with about 5,000 people attending. In July of the same year, they performed as a backing band for the popular singer Karlo Metikoš on his Yugoslav tour, playing 50 concerts.

In 1964, the band released their debut record, the EP Najljepši san (The Most Beautiful Dream), through PGP-RTB record label. The EP featured The Shadows-inspired instrumentals "Najljepši san" and "Ponoć je prošla" ("Midnight Has Passed"), a cover of The Crystals' song "Then He Kissed Me" entitled "Dok je drugi ljubi" ("While Someone Else Is Kissing Her"), and the song "Rekla si: volimo se" ("You Said: We Love Each Other"), the latter becoming their first hit. The EP was sold in more than 100,000 copies in the country in which, at the time, about 120,000 households owned a gramophone. The band achieved nationwide popularity, receiving thousands of fan letters from all over the country, and their performances and debut release were praised by the Yugoslav music press. Following the EP release, the band performed on a battle of the bands at Zagreb's Šalata on 29 June 1964, competing with eight other popular Yugoslav bands and winning the first place. In October 1964, the band performed at the third edition of Vatromet ritma, held at the Novi Sad Fair, alongside Faraoni, Elipse, Detlići and Siluete.

In 1965, Crveni Koralji released their second EP, featuring the songs "Napuljska gitara" ("Naples Guitar"), which was a cover of an Italian folk song, "Maštanje" ("Imagination"), which was a cover of Cliff Richard and the Shadows' song "Don't Talk to Him", "Dolazak" ("The Coming"), which was a cover of the Italian song "Y' Arriva", and "Zvijezdana noć" ("Starry Night"), which was a cover of The Shadows' song "Cosy". During the year, they released their third EP, Otiđi od nje (Leave Her). The title track was a cover of Arthur Alexander's song "You Better Move On". The EP also featured the songs "Svega mi je dosta" ("I Had Enough"), which was a cover of The Valentinos' "It's All Over Now", and two instrumental tracks, "Tema mladih ljubavnika", a cover of The Shadows' "Theme for Young Lovers", and a cover of The Shadows' version of Alberto Domínguez's composition "Perfidia". The band's fourth EP, released in 1966, featured two songs authored by the band, "Sretne godine" ("Happy Years") and "Izgubljenoj ljubavi" ("To the Lost Love"), alongside a cover of The Beatles' song "And I Love Her" entitled "Volim je" ("I Love Her"), and a cover of The Spotnicks' version of the composition "Johnny Guitar". During the year, the band appeared at the Zagreb Festival with the songs "Pismo" ("Letter") and "Cipele stare, cipele nove" ("Old Shoes, New Shoes"), winning the Second Prize for Composition and the First Prize for Lyrics.

With a series of hits, the band rose to the status of the most popular Yugoslav rock band. They were proclaimed the Best Yugoslav Band by the music magazine Ritam for two years in a row, in 1964 and 1965. After The Shadows' performance at the Split Festival, Crveni Koralji had a joint club performance with them. They played as a studio band on records of popular singers like Karlo Metikoš, Đorđe Marjanović, Gabi Novak, Ivo Robić, Zdenka Vučković, Ivica Šerfezi, Zvonko Špišić and others, and performed as the backing band for Tereza Kesovija, Lado Leskovar, Džimi Stanić, Ana Štefok and others. In July 1966, they won first place at the International Beat Festival, organized in Zagreb and featuring Yugoslav and Italian bands. In August, the band went to West Germany, where they spent seven months performing in clubs in Darmstadt, Dortmund, Nuremberg and Frankfurt. After their return to Yugoslavia, they won first place at the Zagreb Music Festival with the song "Ne pitajte za nju" ("Don't Ask Me About Her").

In 1967, under the name Red Corals, they released a split 7-inch single with the Zagreb band Delfini for the Benelux market through Belgian record label Benelux International. The single featured Crveni Koralji song "Napoli Guitar". However, by this period, their popularity in Yugoslavia started to decline, and the band started to suffer from lineup changes. Sarajlić left the band, starting his group 4 Suze (The Four Tears), Crveni Koralji's new bass guitarist becoming Željko "Mika" Hižak, a former member of the band Kon-Tiki. Soon after, Badrić had to leave the band due to his mandatory stint in the Yugoslav army. The band held a farewell concert for Badrić in the Varijete club, with Džentlmeni as the supporting act. The band's new drummer became Boris Turina.

The first record released by the new lineup of the band was the 1968 EP Sam (Alone). The EP brought the hit "Da sam drvosječa", a cover of the Tim Hardin song "If I Were a Carpenter". The EP also featured the band's own songs "Ne želim više tu ljubav" ("I Don't Want That Love Anymore") and "Bila si jedina" ("You Were the Only One"). Despite the success of the EP, part of the Yugoslav music press criticized the band's sound as archaic. On 3 September 1968, the band appeared at the first edition of the Festival of Yugoslav Pop Music in Zagreb. The audience polled their song "Moja gitara" ("My Guitar") as the best song of the festival, and their song "Noćas sam sanjao" ("I Dreamt Last Night") as the fourth, and the jury awarded them with the Best Performance Award. Both songs were released on their following EP, Moja gitara, alongside the songs "U jutro" ("In the Morning"), which was a cover of the song "Al mattino" by the Italian band I Califfi, and "Otac je rekao" ("Father Said"), which was a cover of "Simon Says" by 1910 Fruitgum Company.

In 1969, Babarović left the band. He debuted as a solo artist at the 1969 Subotica Youth Festival, performing the song "Nikad neću biti sretan" ("I'll Never Be Happy"). During the same year, he released the solo EP Dvije čaše (Two Glasses), featuring four songs written by Alfons Vučer. Soon after, Rudi Šimunec also left Crveni Koralji. Wanting to turn towards a more contemporary sound, the remaining members hired an organist, former Bardi (The Bards) member Boris Kajzer. After a short tour across West Germany, the band released a 7-inch single featuring the songs "Bez djevojke" ("Without a Girl") and "Još uvijek se nadam" ("I Still Have Hope"), featuring Hižak on vocals. In October 1969, Badrić returned from the army and rejoined the band, Turina thus leaving the group; Turina would later form the band Drugi Način with former members of Novi Akordi (The New Chords). Badrić managed to persuade Babarović, who was disappointed with the poor reception of his solo EP, to return to the band. Kajzer was replaced by Alfons Vučer, who was already an established pop composer. The new lineup recorded a 7-inch single featuring the song "Mnogo značiš za moj život, draga" ("You Mean a Lot to Me, My Dear"), a cover of Netherlands group Left Side' song "Welcome to My House".

In 1970, there was a new lineup change: Vučer and Hižak were replaced by organist Krešo Pavlić and bass guitarist Vlado Bastajić, the latter a former member of Grešnici; Hižak was drafted into the Yugoslav army, but crossed the Yugoslav border illegally and emigrated to Canada. During 1971, the group performed as the backing band for a group of Yugoslav singers on a three-month Soviet Union tour. At this point, due to the growing popularity of Yugoslav progressive rock bands, Crveni Koralji's popularity and the media's interest for the band were very low, so Babarović once again left the band. He moved to Split, where he formed the band ZiS (short for Zagreb i Split, Zagreb and Split). The band's new vocalist became Marijan Miše, who was soon replaced by Marjan Štupjanski. Crveni Koralji released several more singles, the last one in 1974, failing to make a comeback. During the following years, although not officially disbanding, the group would perform smaller venues occasionally only.

=== 1980s: Return to the scene ===
In mid-1980s, the band continued their activity in the lineup featuring Boris Babarović (vocals), Miroslav Lukačić (guitar), Krešo Pavlić (keyboards), Rudolf Šimunec (bass guitar) and Željko Marinac (drums). They started performing regularly in Zagreb kafana Čarda, and in 1985, they released the LP Rock 'n' roll zbirka (1963–1966) (Rock 'n' roll Collection (1963–1966)), which was Crveni Koralji's first full-length album. For the album, the band re-recorded most of the songs released during the 1963–1966 period. In 1986, they released the album Najbolje izvedbe (Best Performances), which featured their own songs, as well as covers of songs by Creedence Clearwater Revival, the Bee Gees and other artists. In 1986, they also appeared at the MESAM festival with the song "Rajka", which was released on the festival's official compilation album MESAM 86. The band marked the 25th anniversary with the album Ja sam tvoj čovjek (I'm Your Man). The album was released under the moniker Boris Babarović & Crveni Koralji. Besides their own songs, some of them co-written with Neki To Vole Vruće member Silvestar Dragoj, the album also featured a cover of Ritchie Valens' song "Donna" and The Beatles' song "And I Love Her".

=== 1990s and 2000s: Occasional reunions ===
In 1991, the band released the album Po trnju i kamenju – Bože moj! (Across Thorns and Rocks – My God!), featuring traditional religious songs. In 2002, in order to mark the band's 40th anniversary, Babarović re-recorded some of the band's old songs, releasing them under the name Boris Babarović Barba & Crveni Koralji on the album Prvih 40 godina (The First 40 Years). In 2006, the group recorded the album 21 karat in the lineup featuring Babarović, Lukačić, Marinac, Zvonko "Deda" Gorički (bass guitar) and Vlatko Medetski (keyboards). The album featured songs authored by Babarović, Branko Bogunović, Milo Ostrović and other songwriters, as well as covers of foreign hits. In 2008, Croatia Records released the double compilation album The Ultimate Collection, featuring songs from the bands studio releases, as well as songs which they recorded in the 1960s as a studio band working with popular singers – "Jenny te voli" ("Jenny Loves You"), recorded with Gabi Novak, "Peggy Sue", recorded with Karlo Metikoš, "San Francisco", recorded with Mišo Kovač, "Crvene ruže" ("Red Roses"), recorded with Ivica Šerfezi, and "Reci, reci, reci" ("Say, Say, Say"), recorded with Zvonko Špišić.

=== Post disbandment ===
Miroslav Lukačić died on 26 December 2014. Josip Badrić died on 19 February 2019. Zvonko Gorički died on 11 May 2020.

== Legacy ==
In 2010, Serbian pop rock band Kristali recorded a cover of "Da sam drvosječa" for Srđan Koljević's film The Woman with a Broken Nose.

== Discography ==
=== Studio albums ===
- Rock 'n' roll zbirka (1963–1966) (1985)
- Najbolje izvedbe (1986)
- Ja sam tvoj čovjek (1988)
- Po trnju i kamenju – Bože moj! (1991)
- Prvih 40 godina (2002)
- 21 karat (2006)

=== EPs ===
- Najljepši san (1964)
- Napuljska gitara (1965)
- Otiđi od nje (1965)
- Volim je (1966)
- Sam (1968)
- Moja gitara (1969)
- Vrati mi se (1971)

=== Compilation albums ===
- Prvih 30 godina (1994)
- S vama u 3. millennium (1999)
- The Ultimate Collection (2008)
- Greatest Hits Collection (2018)

=== Singles ===
- "Bez djevojke" / "Još uvijek se nadam (1969)
- "Mnogo značiš za moj život, draga" / "Dvije čaše" (1970)
- "Nikad nisam imao ništa" / "Pogrešan broj" (1970)
- "Šjor Bepo moj" / "Na brigu kuća mala" (1972)
- "Neka život teče" / "Vizija" (1972)
- "Za svaki dan" / "Nemoj poći kući" (1973)
- "Elvira" / "Tvoj strani svijet" (1974)

=== Other appearances ===
- "Rajka" (MESAM 86, 1986)
