= Perica Stojančić =

- Born: 18 March 1940; Belgrade, Kingdom of Yugoslavia
- Genres: Rock and roll; rock; pop
- Occupations: Singer, guitarist
- Instruments: Vocals, guitar
- Labels: PGP-RTB, Diskos

Perica Stojančić (Serbian Cyrillic: Перица Стојанчић, born 18 March 1940) is a Yugoslav and Dutch musician, notable as one of the pioneers of the Yugoslav rock scene.

Stojančić started his career in Niš in late 1950s, moving to Belgrade in early 1960s and releasing his debut EP in 1963. His covers of rock and roll songs and his live performances brought him considerable popularity in Yugoslavia. After late 1960s tours in Western Europe, Stojančić contracted tuberculosis and decided to retire from performing, moving to the Netherlands. He returned to live appearances in mid-1970s, performing with Dutch club bands, mostly remaining out of the public eye.

== Biography ==
=== Early life ===
Stojančić was born in Belgrade on 18 March 1940, and moved with his mother to Niš when he was six.

=== Musical career ===
==== 1959–1962: Early career ====
Stojančić started his singing career at the age of sixteen, as a member of Stanko Paunović Choir. He had his debut as a solo singer in Subotica, on one of choir's tours. He attracted public's attention for the first time in 1959, appearing on the competition Mikrofon je vaš (Microphone Is All Yours) organized by Radio Belgrade. Imitating popular Yugoslav singer Đorđe Marjanović and performing his song "Ti, mama i ja" ("You, Mom and Me"), Stojančić shared third place with singer Jelena Stojanović.

The success brought him a place in Jovan Lukić's orchestra, which held regular performances in Niš hotel Park. The performances on dance parties held in hotel brought new attention to Stojančić, who soon became a local live attraction. Following his stint with Lukić's band, Stojančić joined Danilo Vasić's orchestra, performing with them for the following two years. In early September 1962, the orchestra signed a three-month contract with Turist hotel in Kraljevo. On one of their performances, Stojančić was spotted by PGP-RTB executive Dušan Radetić. In December 1962, Danilo Vasić's orchestra performed in Belgrade's Trade Union Hall, on a concert entitled Mladi za mlade (Youth for Youth), Stojančić attracting further attention of the public. The morning after the concert, he signed a contract with PGP-RTB record label.

==== 1963–1969: Nationwide success and retirement from scene ====
In late 1962, Stojančić moved to Belgrade, and in February 1963, he recorded his debut EP Lucia with the A-B-C quintet as the backing band. The title track was a Serbo-Croatian cover of Little Richard's "Lucille", originally recorded a year earlier by another Yugoslav rock and roll singer, Saša Popaz. The EP also featured a cover of Chris Barber's "Land of Dreams", entitled "Te noći" ("That Night"), as well as covers of Johnny Hallyday songs "La faute a twist", entitled "Za sve je kriv twist" ("The Twist Is to Blame"), and "Dans un jardin d'amour", entitled "Vrt ljubavi" ("The Garden of Love"). The EP achieved large commercial success and gained significant media coverage, with Yugoslav press describing Stojančić as "Niš howler".

Stojančić's second EP Za nas (For Us), released in 1964, was more pop–oriented, and did not repeat the commercial success of his debut. The EP, recorded with Milan Stojanović Ensemble as the backing band, included a cover of Johnny Hallyday song "Cherie, oh Cherie", entitled "Draga, oh, draga" ("Darlig, Oh Darling"). During 1964, Stojančić held a number of concerts across Yugoslavia, performing with Niš bands Srećne Ruke (The Lucky Hands), Srećni Dečaci (The Lucky Boys) and Rubinsi (The Rubies) as his backing groups, performing covers of songs by Little Richard, Gene Vincent, The Animals and other acts. In 1965, Stojančić released a split EP with the band Elipse, entitled Sentimental Baby. Although PGP-RTB originally intended to hire Crveni Koralji as the backing band for Stojančić's third EP, Stojančić expressed his desire to record it with Elipse after hearing them playing in Belgrade's Topčider. The A-side of the EP featured Stojančić's songs "Sentimental Baby" and "Ni zbogom nisi rekla", recorded with Elipse and the band Korali (The Corals) as Stojančić's backing bands, and the B-side featuring two Elipse instrumentals. Stojančić and Elipse promoted the EP with a concert in Dom Sindikata, and the record soon became one of the best-selling Yugoslav releases of the year.

In 1966, Stojančić, with guitarist Angelo Vlatović, went on a tour across West Germany. After an initial three-month tour, Stojančić decided to remain in Germany. He spent the following two years performing in West Germany and the Netherlands. Upon his return to Yugoslavia in 1968, on a performance in Herceg Novi, he met the members of the group The Montenegro Five (at the time featuring keyboardist Tihomir Pop Asanović), accepting their offer to undertake another German tour with them.

As a result of long and exhausting tours, Stojančić contracted tuberculosis, and decided to retire from touring. He returned to Niš, where he recorded his last EP Moja žena i ja (My Wife and I) in the manner of schlager music. After the EP recording, he moved to Netherlands, where he spent fourteen months in a sanatorium, eventually undergoing a heart surgery. After recovering, he decided to remain in Netherlands, eventually marrying a Dutch girl.

==== 1974–present: Career in Netherlands ====
After not performing for five years, in 1974, Stojančić joined the Dutch band Musketeers. For the next thirteen years he performed with the group in Dutch clubs. With Musketeers he recorded an album of disco covers of popular rock songs. In 1988, he became a member of Peter & Peacemakers, and in 1994, he formed the duo Double Dutch with Hans Westering, the two performing in Dutch and European clubs.

== Legacy ==
Serbian and Yugoslav rock band Instant Karma recorded a cover of Stojančić's song "Sentimental Baby" on their 1995 album Dan za danom (Day After Day).

== Discography ==
=== EPs ===
- Lucia (1963)
- Za nas (1964)
- Sentimental Baby (With Elipse, 1965)
- Moja žena i ja (1969)
