= Siluete =

Serbian and Yugoslav rock band

- Siluete in 1967, from left to right: Slobodan Todorović, Ljuba Đorđević, Zoran Miščević, Dejan Dunić and Jovan Mišević

Background information
- Also known as: VIS Siluete
- Origin: Belgrade, SR Serbia, SFR Yugoslavia
- Genres: Rock and roll; instrumental rock; beat music; rhythm and blues; rock; shock rock
- Years active: 1961–1971; 1975–1995
- Labels: Diskos, PGP-RTB, PGP-RTS
- Past members: Zoran Miščević; Branko Gluščević; Ilija Stanić; Zoran Simjanović; Jovan Mišević; Miroslav Minić; Gvozden Eror; Dejan Dunić; Miomir Petrović; Ljuba Đorđević; Tomi Sovilj; Božidar Plesničar; Dragi Jelić; Slobodan Todorović; Boban Birtašević; Ljuba Sedlar; Aleksandar Cvetković; Slobodan Orlić; Dragan Vukelić; Radomir Dramičanin; Nikola Čuturilo; Branislav Mirić; Miško Čavor; Dragan Majstorović

Siluete (Serbian Cyrillic: Силуете, trans. The Silhouettes) were a Serbian and Yugoslav rock band formed in Belgrade in 1961. They were among the pioneers of the Yugoslav rock scene and one of the country's most prominent rock acts of the 1960s.

Soon after the formation, Siluete, fronted by charismatic vocalist Zoran Miščević, gained the attention of the audience with their live performances. In 1963, the original members of the band split up, part of the original lineup continuing with new members as The Shadows-inspired instrumental band, and later performing with vocalist Tomi Sovilj. In 1964, the group reunited with Miščević, and the band soon gained nationwide fame owing to their energetic and sometimes transgressive live performances. During the 1960s, they were one of the most popular Yugoslav rock bands, Miščević becoming the first superstar of the Yugoslav rock scene, and the Yugoslav press comparing their rivalry with the band Elipse (whose keyboardist Zoran Simjanović was one of Siluete forming members) to the one between The Rolling Stones and The Beatles. In late 1960s, the band performed abroad, trying to secure a contract with a foreign record label, and, after failing to do so, disbanded in 1971. Miščević reformed Siluete in the mid-1970s and continued to lead them through the following years. A number of musicians passed through the band, with Mišćević and keyboardist Ljuba Đorđević remaining the only mainstay members. The group had numerous live appearances in late 1970s and the 1980s, but enjoyed little mainstream popularity and media attention. Miščević died in 1995, Siluete thus ending their activity.

== History ==
=== 1961–1971 ===
==== 1961–1964: Formation and rise to prominence, split-up and reunion ====
Siluete were formed by vocalist Zoran Miščević, who began his musical career by playing bongos in a school orchestra, and rhythm guitarist Branko Gluščević, who had previously been the leader of the combo Black Cats. The two decided to form a beat band, and started Siluete with Ilija Stanić (guitar), Zoran Simjanović (keyboards) and Jovan "Miške" Mišević (drums). The five started playing together on 20 October 1961. Influenced by the film The Young Ones featurig Cliff Richard and The Shadows, they decided to name the band Siluete, after Gluščević's idea.

The band had their first performance on a school dance in Belgrade Economy School, which was followed by performances on numerous dances, in the café at the Tašmajdan Park and in the club Euridika. Mišević was soon replaced by more experienced Miroslav "Mine" Minić. At the beginning of 1962, the band had their first appearance in front of larger crowd, performing with popular singer Đorđe Marjanović on his concert in Belgrade's Trade Union Hall. Siluete appeared on stage to play as Marjanović's backing band on the songs "My Girl Josephine" and "Peppermint Twist". During 1962, the group actively performed on dances and in the club Orfeum as a part of the club's cabaret program. During the year, percussionist Gvozden Eror performed with them for a short period of time.

After performances in Makarska and Dubrovnik in the summer of 1963, the forming members of Siluete split up. Simjanović moved to Elipse, Miščević, Gluščević and Minić formed Lutalice (The Wanderers) with guitarist Božidar "Lari" Plesničar and rhythm guitarist Slobodan Mihajlović, and Ilić continued to lead Siluete in the new lineup: Dejan Dunić (bass guitar), Jovan Mišević (drums), Miomir "Kraka" Petrović (formerly of Safiri, rhythm guitar) and Ljuba Đorđević (keyboards). This lineup of the band performed The Shadows-influenced instrumental music. After one of their performances, they were approached by singer Tomislav "Tomi" Sovilj (formerly of Zlatni Dečaci), who suggested that they work together. As Lutalice disbanded in 1964, Miščević moved back to Siluete, bringing along Plesničar. However, Siluete still had a contract with Sovilj, so for a short period of time, the band performed with two singers: Sovilj would perform the first part of the group's set, and Miščević the second. After a year of collaborating with Sovilj, Siluete continued with Miščević as the sole vocalist.

==== 1964–1971: Nationwide popularity, disbandment ====
The new lineup had their first larger performance at the Vuk Karadžić Cultural Centre, on the concert entitled "Koncert za karikaturu i tvist" ("A Concert for Caricature and Twist), organized by the satirical magazine Jež (Hedgehog). The band played numerous concerts in the club Euridika, the café in the Tašmajdan Park, the City Basement dancing hall and Belgrade Youth Center. On October 14, 1964, they appeared, alongside Faraoni, Elipse, Detlići and Crveni Koralji, on the Vatromet ritma (Fireworks of Rhythm) festival in Novi Sad. The concert was a part of Parada ritma (Parade of Rhythm) concert series, arguably the first rock festival in a communist country, and the bands that performed were chosen via poll conducted by the music magazine Ritam. In mid-1964, Tomi Sovilj formed his own Siluete, but the members of the original Siluete filed a lawsuit against him, Sovilj eventually continuing to perform with his band under the name Tomi Sovilj i Njegove Siluete (Tomi Sovilj and His Silhouettes).

During 1965 and 1966, Siluete shocked the Yugoslav public with their energetic live performances and their appearance, which secured them with huge popularity. At the time, there were around 230 rock bands in Belgrade, but most of them had short hair and tidy clothes, which were the standards Siluete would change. In 1965, the band performed on the Parada ritma festival held in Hall 3 of the Belgrade Fair in front of some 3,500 people. Siluete appeared in the competitive part of the program alongside Plamenih 5, Sanjalice, Juniori, Plavi Dečaci and Elipse, and were proclaimed the Best Band. During the year, the band also appeared in Branko Bauer's film Doći i ostati (To Come and to Stay). At the first edition of the Belgrade Gitarijada festival, held in January 1966 at Belgrade Fair – Hall 1, Siluete performed with other popular rock groups. They were proclaimed the second best band (behind Elipse) by the jury, but were voted the Best Band by the audience. On the festival debuted the band's new guitarist Dragi Jelić, formerly of the band Beduini (The Bedouins), who came to the group as the replacement for Plesničar. As all the members of Siluete except Jelić had long hair, he appeared on the stage wearing a wig. Following his departure from Siluete, Plesničar continued his career as the member of Beat Kvintet (Beat Quintet), and later moved to Studenti (The Students).

In 1966, Siluete released their debut EP, Tvoj rođendan (Your Birthday) through Diskos record label. Besides the title track, which was a cover of Small Faces song "Sha-La-La-La-Lee", the EP featured the songs "Najdraži san" ("The Dearest Dream", a cover of The Searchers song "When You Walk in the Room"), "Keti" (a cover of Ray Peterson's "Cathy") and "Uhvati vetar" (a cover of Donovan's "Catch the Wind"). The Serbo-Croatian lyrics for the songs were written by Miomir Petrović. The release was generally disliked by Yugoslav music press, and the band members themselves stated that the songs were recorded hastily and that they were not satisfied with the release. However, Tvoj rođendan manage to sell more than 60,000 copies. During the year, Siluete had more than 80 concerts across Yugoslavia, often performing large venues. In Skopje they performed during pouring rain in front of about 6,000 people. They performed at Olja Ivanjicki's Belgrade and Zagreb happenings, and appeared in Sava Popović's short film Rapsodija u crnom (Rhapsody in Black).

Siluete performing at the 1967 Gitarijada Festival in Belgrade

In February 1967, Siluete won the first place on the second edition of Gitarijada festival. At the time, the Yugoslav media had already started promoting rivalry between Silute and Elipse, comparing it to the one between The Rolling Stones and The Beatles, Elipse usually being proclaimed more competent musicians and Siluete described as better showmen. The rivalry resulted in a competition of these two bands held at the Belgrade Youth Center, where the audience was to poll the winner. The competition, consisting of a musical performance, caricature drawing and reciting poetry, was won by Elipse with 146 votes advantage. In April 1967, both bands performed as the opening acts on The Searchers concerts in Belgrade and Zrenjanin.

In 1967, Siluete released two more EPs. The first one was entitled Dona. Beside the title track, which was a cover of Ritchie Valens song "Donna", the EP featured the songs "Noć za ljubav" ("A Night for Love", a cover of The Troggs song "With a Girl Like You"), "Moj srećan dom" ("My Happy Home", a cover of Stonewall Jackson's "I Washed My Hands in Muddy Water") and "Uzmi ili ostavi" (a cover of The Rolling Stones' "Take It or Leave It"). The second EP was entitled Kišu sam tražio (I Asked for Rain). This was the band's first release to feature two original songs by the band – the title track and the song "Raskid" ("Breakup"), both of them written by Dunić. The other two songs on the EP were "Voleti nekog" (a cover of the Bee Gees' "To Love Somebody") and "Plakaću sutra" (a cover of The Searchers' "I'll Cry Tomorrow"). The group appeared in the TV show Koncert za ludi mladi svet (A Concert for Crazy Young World) with their versions of songs "I'm a Man" and "Massachusetts", the videos for which were shot in the Wild West town settings in the Avala Film Studios. During the year, Srđan Karanović–at the time film direction student, later a prominent Yugoslav director–made a television film about the band, entitled Učio sam dve godine kontrabas (I Learned to Play Bass for Two Years), and the band also acted in the TV series Krug dvojkom (A Round by Streetcar No. 2), appearing as cavemen creating music by using bones. In 1967, they were voted the best Yugoslav band by the readers of the youth magazine Mladost (Youth).

The band's fame was followed by scandals. On the streets of Belgrade, several attempts were made by different individuals to cut Miščević's long blonde hair, so he got the media's attention by attempting to insure his hair. He provoked the conservative public by posing for photographers under a hooded dryer, by wearing excessive jewelry and by stating that his only mistake was not being born in the age of Romulus and Remus. Prior to a concert in Zagreb, Miščević announced that he would kill twenty chickens during the performance, and on a concert in Niš he provoked audience to trow rotten fruit on stage. On some of the concerts, he organized dancing competitions for girls from the audience, with the first prize being a week of dating him, the second prize three days of dating him and the third prize a date with him. He started receiving hundreds of fan letters, becoming the first Yugoslav superstar since singer Đorđe Marjanović, and young people across Yugoslavia sprayed the band's name on walls. However, part of the music press criticized the band for dedicating most of their attention to their appearance and not making any efforts to improve their musical skills and sound.

Encouraged by the success in Yugoslavia, the band decided to try to break into the foreign market, for months performing in Austria and West Germany. In Vienna they performed in the clubs Chattanooga and Star Club, attracting some media attention, with the newspaper Kurier describing them as "descendants of hajduks who fought against the Turks". However, guitarist Dragi Jelić left the band and joined Džentlmeni (later forming highly successful YU Grupa with his brother Žika Jelić). He was replaced by a former Džentlmeni member Slobodan Todorović, who would himself later be replaced by Boban Birtašević. Despite their absence from the Yugoslav scene, they still enjoyed attention of the Yugoslav media, with some Yugoslav newspapers publishing the rumor that Siluete performed at a graveyard in Nuremberg.

After their efforts to gain success abroad failed, the band decided to dedicate themselves to their status on the Yugoslav scene. They organized their comeback concert in Belgrade Youth Center, featuring Džentlmeni as the opening band and a guest appearance by the jazz ballet group Džezabal (Jazzabelle). The music press praised the performance and the fact the band had started dedicating more attention to their musicianship. After the concert, the group went on a Yugoslav tour during which they performed 120 concerts. A part of the tour was a twenty-three-hour concert held on New Year's Eve in Belgrade Youth Center. In January 1968, at their concert in Sarajevo, a riot broke out. A large number of chairs was broken, Miščević's shirt was ripped into pieces and his gold necklace was torn off, Ljuba Đorđević was hit on the head with a bottle and their manager's wallet was stolen. At a concert in Novi Sad, the band members smashed their guitars, got in a fight with individuals from the audience, and the band's van was heavily damaged by the mob. The band spent the summer of 1968 performing in Belgrade, playing four times a week in the Rade Končar School yard. During the year, Miščević wrote a monthly column for Mladost magazine. In late 1968, Birtašević was replaced by Ljuba Sedlar, formerly of the band Vizije (The Visions).

In 1969, Dunić left the band and moved to London. He was replaced by bass guitarist and painter Aleksandar Cvetković. After releasing the single with the songs "Sećanje na Keti" ("Memory of Cathy"), authored by Džentlmeni leader Branko Marušić "Čutura", and "Dosadan dan" ("Boring Day", a cover of "Heaven Knows" by The Grass Roots), they started performing in clubs all over Europe, once again trying to secure a contract with a foreign record label. After failing to do so, they split-up.

The members of the band returned to Yugoslavia, with only Miščević staying in West Germany. He spent one more year there, performing with an Italian band. After returning to Yugoslavia in 1973, he performed with different bands, including the band Formula Ljubavi (Formula of Love) from Inđija, making an appearance on their 1973 7-inch single "Banane" / "Reka suza" ("Bananas" / "River of Tears"), before he decided to retire from the scene.

=== 1975–1995: Reformation, live activities, Miščević's death ===
One of numerous Siluete lineups from the 1980s. The lineup pictured features Nikola Čuturilo (second one from the right), who later gained fame as guitarist for Riblja Čorba and solo artist.

In 1975, Miščević decided to reform Siluete. The new lineup featured, beside Miščević, only one former member of Siluete original incarnation, Ljuba Đorđević (keyboards). The rest of the lineup consisted of Slobodan "Boba" Orlić (formerly of Bitnici, bass guitar), Dragan Vukelić (electric piano) and Radomir Dramičanin (formerly of Dah, drums). Siluete went on a tour, Miščević appearing on stage with a snake in the manner of Alice Cooper, but the group saw little success and disbanded once again. In 1976, Miščević and Đorđević reformed Siluete with a group of younger musicians. This lineup recorded the singles "Ponoćni voz" ("Midnight Train") and "Makedonsko devojče" ("Macedonian Girl"), the latter featuring former Miss Yugoslavia Lidija Vekovska on vocals.

During the following years, Siluete had a large number of live performances, but saw little success. The new musical trends had pushed them to the margins of the Yugoslav rock scene, and the group usually performed smaller venues to little media attention. However, they did appear on several large festivals, on which the band would usually perform a cover of Bijelo Dugme's hit "Kad bi bio bijelo dugme" ("If I Were a White Button"), with altered lyrics including the verses "Dok su bile Siluete / Dugmići su bili malo dete" ("While Silhouettes were playing / the Buttons were just kids"). Siluete would appear on Bijelo Dugme's 1979 Rock Spectacle at JNA Stadium as one of the opening bands.

During the late 1970s, 1980s and early 1990s, more than 180 musicians passed through Siluete, with Miščević and Đorđević remaining the only mainstay members of the group. Đorđević died in 1986 after long illness, but Miščević decided to continue the band's activity. Zoran Miščević died on 4 April 1995, Siluete thus ceasing to exist.

=== Posthumous releases ===
In 2000, the compilation album VIS Siluete (VIS being an abbreviation for Vokalno-instrumentalni sastav, trans. Vocal-instrumental ensemble) was released by PGP-RTS, featuring an overview of the band's work.

The songs "Tvoj rođendan", "Uhvati vetar" and the previously unreleased instrumental "Tema Silueta" ("Siluete's Theme") were published on the box set Kad je rock bio mlad – Priče sa istočne strane (1956–1970) (When Rock Was Young – East Side Stories (1956–1970)), released by Croatia Records in 2005 and featuring songs by the pioneering Yugoslav rock acts. "Tema Silueta" was recorded in 1962, on a rehearsal in Gvozden Eror's apartment.

=== Activities of former members ===
Following his departure from Siluete, guitarist Ilija Stanić formed the band Slomljena Srca (The Broken Hearts). After the group disbanded in 1973, he moved to Libya, where he worked as mechanical engineer. He retired from music, but started a career in painting.

Siluete former drummer Miroslav Minić moved to Germany in 1968, where he performed with Belgrade Show Orchestra. In 1971, he moved to Norway. He performed until 1986, when he dedicated himself to fashion design.

Miomir Petrović formed the old city music band Daniluške. He wrote the main theme for Branko Bauer's TV series The Farm in the Small Marsh, appearing in the series in a supporting role. He also composed two instrumentals recorded by guitarist Boris Višnjički. Petrović died in early 1990s.

The band's former members Mišević, Todorović, Dunić and Cvetković were all members of the band CD, active between 1971 and 1975 and led by vocalist and keyboardist Dragan Cvetić. The group recorded eight 7-inch singles during the four years of activity. After the group disbanded, Cvetković dedicated himself to painting. Slobodan Todorović died on 27 May 2008. Jovan Mišević was the dean of Union–Nikola Tesla University Faculty of Diplomacy and Security. He died on 13 April 2015.

== Legacy ==
Miščević was awarded several times for his contribution to Yugoslav music, including the SR Serbia Seventh of July Award and the First of May Award.

In 2014, Živko M. Bojanić published a book about Miščević, entitled Prvoborac rokenrola (Veteran of Rock 'n' Roll).

The song "Uhvati vetar" was covered by the Yugoslav rock band Jura Stublić & Film on their 1989 album Zemlja sreće (Land of Happiness).

== Discography ==
=== EPs ===
- Tvoj rođendan (1966)
- Dona (1967)
- Kišu sam tražio (1967)

=== Compilation albums ===
- VIS Siluete (2000)

=== Singles ===
- "Sećanje na Keti" / "Dosadan dan" (1969)
- "Makedonsko devojče" / "The Girls From Macedonia" (1976)
- "Ponoćni voz" / "Plačem" (1977)

=== Other appearances ===
- "Tvoj rođendan" / "Uhvati vetar" / "Tema Silueta" (Kad je rock bio mlad – Priče sa istočne strane (1956–1970), 2005)
