= Plamenih 5 =

Yugoslav rock band (1964–1969)

Background information
- Origin: Belgrade, SR Serbia, SFR Yugoslavia
- Genres: Beat music; rock
- Years active: 1964–1969
- Past members: Branislav Aranđelović; Dragoljub Pavlović; Miomir Petrović; Dragoslav Lazarević; Dobrivoje Radojević; Slobodan Orlić; Vojislav Čobanski; Haim Moreno; Miloš Stajić; Ljuba Sedlar

Plamenih 5 (Serbian Cyrillic: Пламених 5, trans. The Flaming 5) were a Yugoslav rock band formed in Belgrade in 1964. Despite having no official releases during their original run, the band are notable for being among the pioneers of the Yugoslav rock scene.

== History ==
=== 1964-1969 ===
The band was formed in 1964 by Branislav Aranđelović (guitar), Dragoljub Pavlović (bass guitar), Miomir Petrović (rhtythm guitar), Dragoslav Lazarević (keyboards) and Dobrivoje Radojević (drums). The band's later lineups featured bass guitarist Slobodan "Boba" Orlić and rhythm guitarist Vojislav Čobanski.

Initially the band performed mostly covers of beat hits. During 1965, they held regular performances at the Euridika club in Belgrade. In May of the same year they won the first place at the Festival of Youth, and in December they performed at the Parada ritma festival, held in Belgrade Fair. In early 1966, they were joined by vocalist Haim Moreno. In January 1966, the new lineup perfoRmed ar the Belgrade Gitarijada battle of the bands festival, winning the third place. Shortly after, they performed at Božidar Adžija People's University hall alongside the band Čavke and the Germany-based singer Danica Mihajlović "Daniela". In 1966, the band performed as the backing band for Mihajlović on her EP I Got You Baby. The EP included the song "Ja nekoga želim" ("I Want Somebody"), which was, under the title "I Need Somebody", covered by British pop singer Don Fardon on his 1968 debut album Lament of the Cherokee Indian Reservation.

In 1967, the band included the song "Skarlet" ("Scarlet") into their repertoire, making a recording of it for Radio Belgrade, the song becoming a minor hit for the group. For the TV show Koncert za ludi mladi svet (Concert for Young Crazy World) they recorded the song "Ja nikad nisam bio sam" ("I Was Never Alone"). During the year, Dragoljub Pavlović wrote the song "Oči" ("Eyes") for the omnibus film Vreme ljubavi (The Time of Love), for the story "Kavez" ("The Cage"); however, the film was never released, possibly because it dealt with the controversial topic of drug addiction. However, the band appeared in the short film Izrazito ja (Distinctly Me), a graduate work by film direction student Jovan Jovanović, playing a cover of Spencer Davis Group song "I'm a Man".

At the end of 1967, Moreno was replaced by Miloš Stajić, and Aranđelović was replaced by Ljuba Sedlar. Towards the end of the decade, the band moved towards more complex sound, but failed to achieve mainstream popularity. They disbanded at the end of the 1960s.

=== Post breakup ===
Following his departure from Plamenih 5, Branislav Aranđelović formed the band Plamenih 6, which featured Miodrag Nedeljković (bass guitar), Lazar Paskul (organ), Dušan Ranković (trumpet), Miroslav Filipović (trombone) and Radomir Trivić (drums). Initially they performed as the backing band for singers Nina Spirova, Gordana Krispov and Tomi Sovilj. They had a diverse repertoire, but failed to reach larger popularity. During 1969 and 1970, they performed in the Atelje 212 theatre play Veza (Connection), directed by Branko Pleša. From 1977 to 1980, Aranađelović was a member of the comedy folk band Rokeri s Moravu.

During the 1970s, Orlić was a member of Siluete and Opus. Dragoslav Lazarević worked as a sound recorder at Radio Belgrade.

Dragoljub Pavlović, Miomir Petrović, Dragoslav Lazarević and Miloš Stajić are all deceased.

In 2000, Plamenih 5 song "Ja nikad nisam bio sam", originally recorded for Television Belgrade, was released on the various artists compilation album Jugobeat Explosion: 60s Punk From Yugoslavia by the Dutch record label Red Beat.
