= Iskre =

Yugoslav rock band (1961–1967)

- Iskre in 1964

Background information
- Origin: Belgrade, SR Serbia, SFR Yugoslavia
- Genres: Rock and roll; instrumental rock; beat music; folk rock
- Years active: 1961–1967
- Label: Diskos
- Past members: Miloš Sekulić; Slavoljub Bogdanović; Gligorije Milanović; Draško Reljin; Branislav Nikolić; Dragan Mirković; Branko Gluščević

Iskre (Serbian Cyrillic: Искре; English: The Sparks) were a Yugoslav rock band formed in Belgrade in 1961. They were one of Yugoslavia's earliest rock bands and are notable for being among the pioneers of the Yugoslav rock scene. Achieving notable success in the early 1960s with their instrumental rock sound, the band released three EPs and played as a backing band for a number of popular Yugoslav singers, before seeing a decline in popularity and disbanding in 1967.

== History ==
=== 1961-1967 ===
The band was officially formed in 1961 by the students of Belgrade's Second Gymnasium: Miloš Sekulić (guitar), Slavoljub Bogdanović (rhythm guitar), Gligorije Milanović (bass guitar), and Draško Reljin (drums), although at the time of the official formation the members of the band have already been performing together for two years, playing school parties on acoustic instruments. The band found inspiration for their name in Iskra (Spark) company amplifiers, originally designed for movie theaters, which they used at the beginning of their career. Initially, they wanted to name themselves Sparks, but opted for Serbo-Croatian name fearing Sparks might sound too Western. They started off under the name Beogradske Iskre (Belgrade Sparks), but very soon shortened the name to Iskre only.

The group started their career by playing instrumentals inspired by the music of The Tornados, Johnny and the Hurricanes, and The Shadows, soon gaining notable local popularity. At the 1962 May Youth Festival, held at Belgrade's Trade Union Hall, they won the first place. On the festival, they met organist Branislav "Beka" Nikolić, who decided to leave his band 3+1 and join Iskre. This lineup of the band held rehearsals in Sekulić's house, but, as the neighbors complained, they were forced to find another space for rehearsals. Luckily, Radio Belgrade invited them to become the official musical ensemble of Radio Belgrade Youth, granting them space for rehearsals. They started performing on matinée dances in the club Terazije, at pop concerts and on Radio Belgrade. Iskre were one of the first Yugoslav rock bands to play as a backing band on the recordings of pop music singers; during their existence they made recordings with popular singers Zafir Hadžimanov (covers of Cliff Richard songs), Ivanka Pavlović, Zoran Rambosek, and others. In addition, the band appeared in the popular children's television show Na slovo na slovo (I Spy), playing as the backing band for singers Lola Novaković and Nada Knežević.

During 1963, female vocalist Brankica Sučević, who was a member of the band Safiri (The Sapphires), occasionally performed with Iskre. The band wanted to record their debut EP with her as the vocalist, but the editors of Diskos record label insisted that the band record the EP with the then-popular singer Ivanka Pavlović. The EP—featuring the songs "Mala Šeila" ("Little Sheila"), "Locomotion" (a cover of Little Eva song), "Peppermint Twist" (a cover of Joey Dee and the Starliters song), and "Slušaj pesmu" ("Listen to the Song")—was eventually released with only Ivanka Pavlović's name on the cover, soon becoming the second best-selling Yugoslav pop music record. After the recording of the EP, Milanović left the band, and was replaced by a former Duet M member Dragan Mirković.

In January 1964, the band won the first place at the Parada ritma (Parade of Rhythm) festival held at Trade Union Hall. On Parada ritma, which was the first rock festival held in Yugoslavia and arguably the first rock festival in a communist country, Iskre performed alongside Safiri, Lutalice, Zlatni Dečaci and Ivanka Pavlović & Valjevski Dečaci. Several months later, Iskre held their first solo concert, organized by the magazine Duga at Ilija M. Kolarac Endowment, and soon after released their official debut EP, with songs "Stalaktit" (a cover of Les Aiglons song "Stalactite"), "Šeba" (a cover of Johnny and the Hurricanes song "Sheeba"), "Rock za dobro jutro" ("Good Morning Rock", a cover of Johnny and the Hurricanes' version of "Reveille") and "Zvončići" (a cover of "Jingle Bells"). After the release of the EP, Mirković left the band, and was replaced by a former Siluete and Lutalice member Branko Gluščević.

During 1965, Iskre recorded two EPs, both featuring four songs with three of them being instrumental tracks. The first EP featured "Tequila" (their version of the 1958 song by The Champs), "Jahanje na vetru" (a cover of The Tornados' "Ridin' the Wind"), "Žuta jakna" (a cover of The Ventures' "Yellow Jacket") and "Kuća izlazećeg sunca" (a cover of "The House of the Rising Sun"), the latter featuring Bogdanović on vocals. The second EP featured the instrumentals "Bossa Nova", "Ukraina" (a cover of a Russian folk song), and "Nebeski jahači" ("Sky Riders", a cover of "Ghost Riders in the Sky"), as well as a cover of The Beatles song "I Wanna Be Your Man", entitled "Želim da sam tvoj" and featuring Bodganović on vocals. During the same year Iskre appeared in Toma Janić's film Glasam za ljubav (I Give My Vote to Love), thus becoming the first Yugoslav rock band to appear on film.

In 1966, the band perfomred at Gitarijada festival in Belgrade, winning the fifth place. At this time, the band's popularity started to decline due to the growing popularity of new styles of rock on the Yugoslav scene. In an attempt to restore their popularity, the band turned to covering Macedonian traditional songs, but did not see the expected success, and their record label Diskos refused to finance the recording of an EP with their new material due to low sales of Iskre's previous two records. The band planned a tour across England, which, according to texts in Yugoslav press of the time, should have been organized by Brian Epstein's brother Clive. The tour was never organized, as the members of Iskre failed to obtain work visas. The members decided to end their activity, disbanding in late 1967.

=== Post breakup ===
Gluščević continued his career in bands Dah and Rokeri s Moravu. Mirković played in Nena Ivošević's backing orchestra. During the 1990s, he was the president of the Association of Jazz and Popular Music Artists of Yugoslavia. Branislav Nikolić moved to Sweden, where he worked as a music teacher. Upon his return to Serbia, he settled in Šabac, where he still resides, composing and playing with local bands. Gligorije Milanović moved to Canada, where he still resides.

Slavoljub Bogdanović died in April 1998. Draško Reljin completed his studies of economy and got a job at the Yugoslav airline and flag carrier JAT. He worked in JAT's office in Sydney and later in Oslo, where he continued to reside after his retirement. He died on 12 September 2020. Sekulić moved to New York, starting a successful career in architecture and painting. He died on 7 March 2022.

The songs from the band's debut EP appeared on the box set Kad je rock bio mlad – Priče sa istočne strane (1956–1970) (When Rock Was Young – East Side Stories (1956–1970)), released by Croatia Records in 2005 and featuring songs by the pioneering Yugoslav rock acts.

== Discography ==
=== EPs ===
- Stalaktit (1964)
- Tequila (1965)
- Bossa Nova (1965)
