= Parada ritma =

Series of concerts held in Yugoslavia during 1964 and 1965

- Genre: Rock
- Locations: Belgrade, SR Serbia, SFR Yugoslavia; Novi Sad, SR Serbia, SFR Yugoslavia
- Years active: 1964 - 1965

Parada ritma (Parade of Rhythm), also known as Vatromet ritma (trans. Fireworks of Rhythm), was a series of concerts held in SFR Yugoslavia during 1964 and 1965. The first concert in the series is notable as the first rock festival in Yugoslavia and arguably the first rock festival in a communist country.

== History ==
=== 1964 ===
==== Parada ritma ====
The first concert in the series, considered the first rock festival in Yugoslavia, was held in Belgrade's Dom Sindikata in January 1964. The festival featured beat bands Safiri, Iskre, Lutalice, Zlatni Dečaci and singer Ivanka Pavlović accompanied by the band Valjevski Dečaci.

==== Vatromet ritma (Belgrade) ====
The second concert was held on March 24, 1964, in Hall 3 of the Belgrade Fair. It is considered the first large rock concert held in Yugoslavia, with about 5,000 people attending it. The bands that performed included Safiri, Nautilus, Zlatni Dečaci, Lutalice, Iskre, Elipse, Crveni Koralji and Sadžo.

==== Vatromet ritma (Novi Sad) ====
The concert was held on October 14 in Novi Sad Fair. The bands that performed were chosen via poll conducted by the music magazine Ritam. The concert featured performances by Faraoni, Elipse, Detlići, Siluete and Crveni Koralji.

=== 1965 ===
==== Parada ritma ====
The concert was held in Hall 3 of the Belgrade Fair. The festival had a competitive character. The non-competitive part featured performances of the bands Lutalice and Četiri Bebe, while Siluete, Plamenih 5, Sanjalice, Juniori, Plavi Dečaci and Elipse performed in the competitive part, with each band playing three songs. Siluete were pronounced the best among the bands. Some 3,500 people attended the concert.

== See also ==
- List of historic rock festivals
