= Miki Jevremović =

Yugoslav–Serbian singer (1941–2017)

- Born: Miodrag Jevremović; 27 March 1941; Belgrade, Kingdom of Yugoslavia
- Died: 13 January 2017 (aged 75) Belgrade, Serbia
- Genres: popular music pop
- Occupation: singer
- Years active: 1962—2016
- Labels: Jugoton, PGP RTS

Miodrag "Miki" Jevremović (27 March 1941 – 13 January 2017) was a Serbian and Yugoslav singer of popular music.

== Biography ==
Miki Jevremović was born on 27 March 1941 in Belgrade to Vidoje Jevremović and Angelina (née Blagojević) Jevremović. He attended a gymnasium where he was exempt from final exams (matura) on account of being an excellent student. He enrolled at the Faculty of Mechanical Engineering at the University of Belgrade, but never graduated.

He rose to prominence and enjoyed popularity in Yugoslavia in the 1960s and 70s. He participated in various Yugoslav music festivals, including "Vaš šlager sezone" (Sarajevo), "Beogradsko proleće", "Zagrebački festival", "Opatijski festival" and "Splitski festival". In the 1990s, he also participated in summer festivals in Montenegro. He collaborated with many composers within the country and abroad, such as Boris Bizetić, Mikis Teodorakis etc.

The beginning of his career was marked by the songs: "Mama", "Pijem" and "Osamnaest žutih ruža" (where he was backed by Zlatni dečaci). Later hits were: "Ako jednom vidiš Mariju", "S kim si sada kad je tužno vreme" and "Pesnikova gitara". His later hits include: "Grkinja", "Lihnida" and "Neka toče staro vino". In the 1970s, alongside Đorđe Marjanović and Radmila Karaklajić, he was also very popular in the USSR, where he was declared singer of the year in 1974 and 1975.

His daughter, Jelena Jevremović, is also a singer in Serbia.

Besides music, Jevremović was interested in chess, and he participated in several tournaments in Yugoslavia and abroad. His greatest success was a draw with world champion Anatoly Karpov. His highest FIDE rating was 2125.

On December 29, 2016, Jevremović suffered a stroke, which resulted in his death after a two week coma on January 13, 2017. He was buried in the Alley of Distinguished Citizens at the Belgrade New Cemetery.

== In popular culture ==
During the height of Jevremović's popularity, there was a rivalry between his fans and the fans of Đorđe Marjanović. Thus, there were clubs of ardent fans: "đokisti" (Đokists) and "mikisti" (Mikists). In popular culture, this division is seen in the TV series Državni posao. The main character of this comedy, Đorđe Čvarkov, is a Mikist.
