= Novi Sad Fair =

Company based in Novi Sad, Serbia

- Новосадски сајам Novosadski sajam Újvidéki Vásár
- Official logo

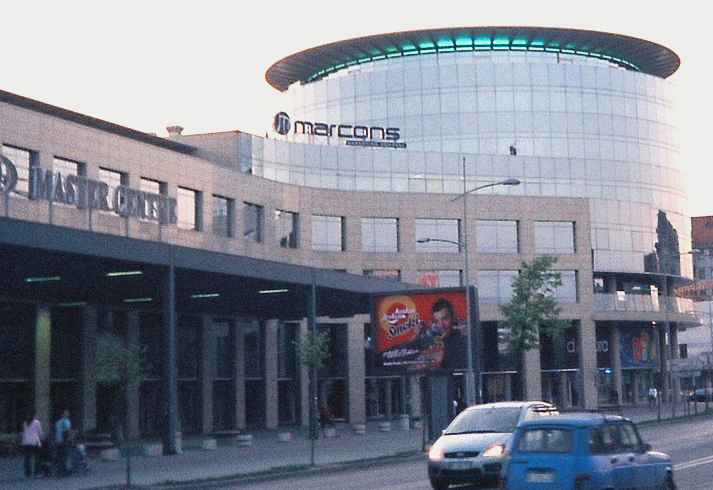
- Novi Sad Fair Master Centar building
- Interactive map of Novi Sad Fair
- Address: Hajduk Veljkova 11
- Location: Novi Sad, Serbia
- Coordinates: 45.2555631°N 19.8201692°E
- Capacity: 60,000 m^{2} (650,000 sq ft)
- Type: Event Management company
- Record attendance: 600,000 (Agricultural fair)

Construction
- Opened: 1923; 103 years ago

Website
- www.sajam.net

Novi Sad Fair (Serbian: Новосадски сајам, romanized: Novosadski sajam; Hungarian: Újvidéki Vásár) is an event management company located in Novi Sad, Serbia, which organizes one of the largest agricultural fairs in Southeast Europe. Taking place every May in Novi Sad, it is also one of the largest agricultural fairs in Europe, with approximately 600,000 visitors attending the event. Novi Sad Fair also organizes other shows, e.g. technology and finance, as well as congresses and exhibitions, which brings in a total of about one million visitors to the city each year.

== Features ==
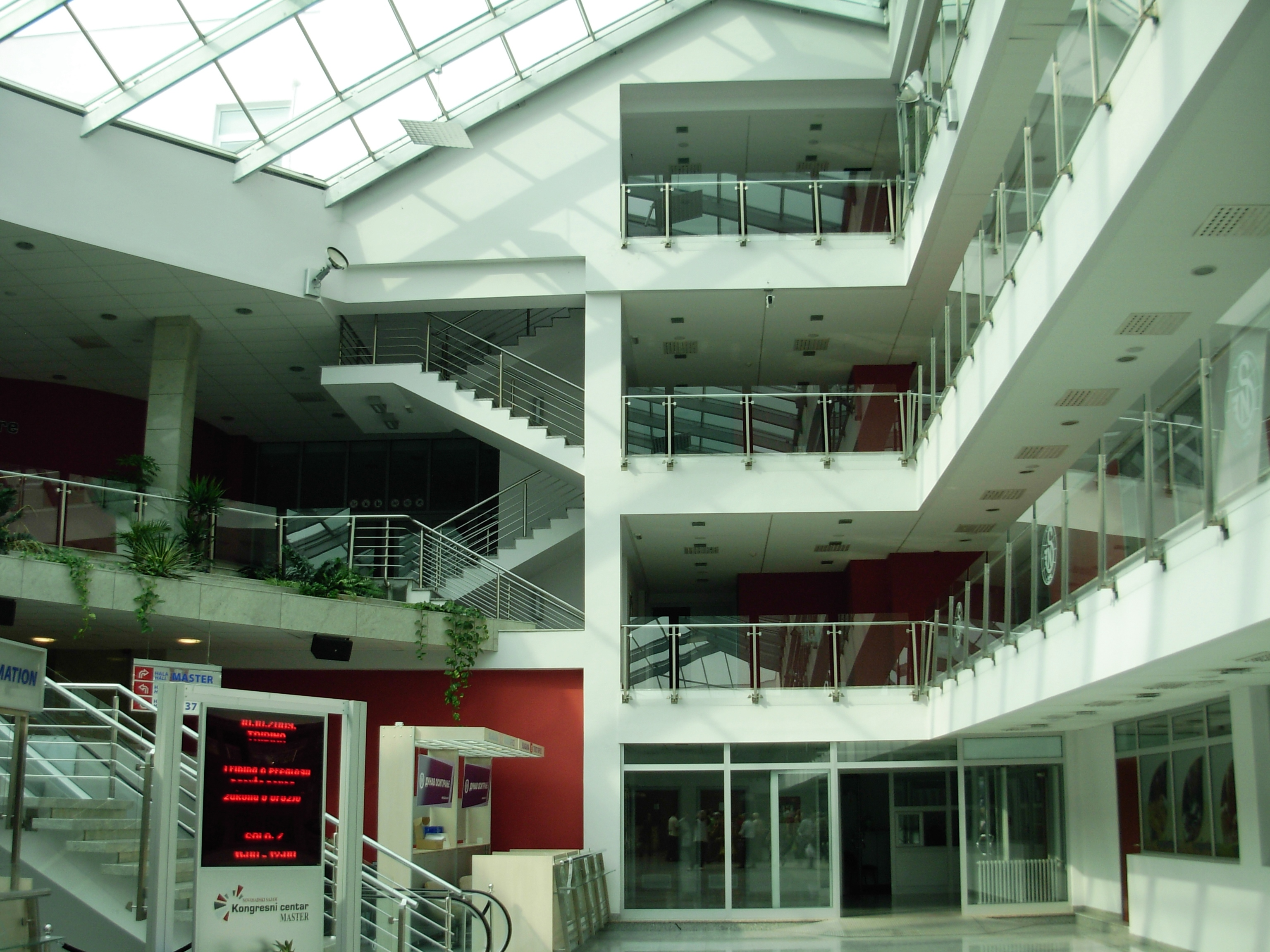
Novi Sad Fair interior

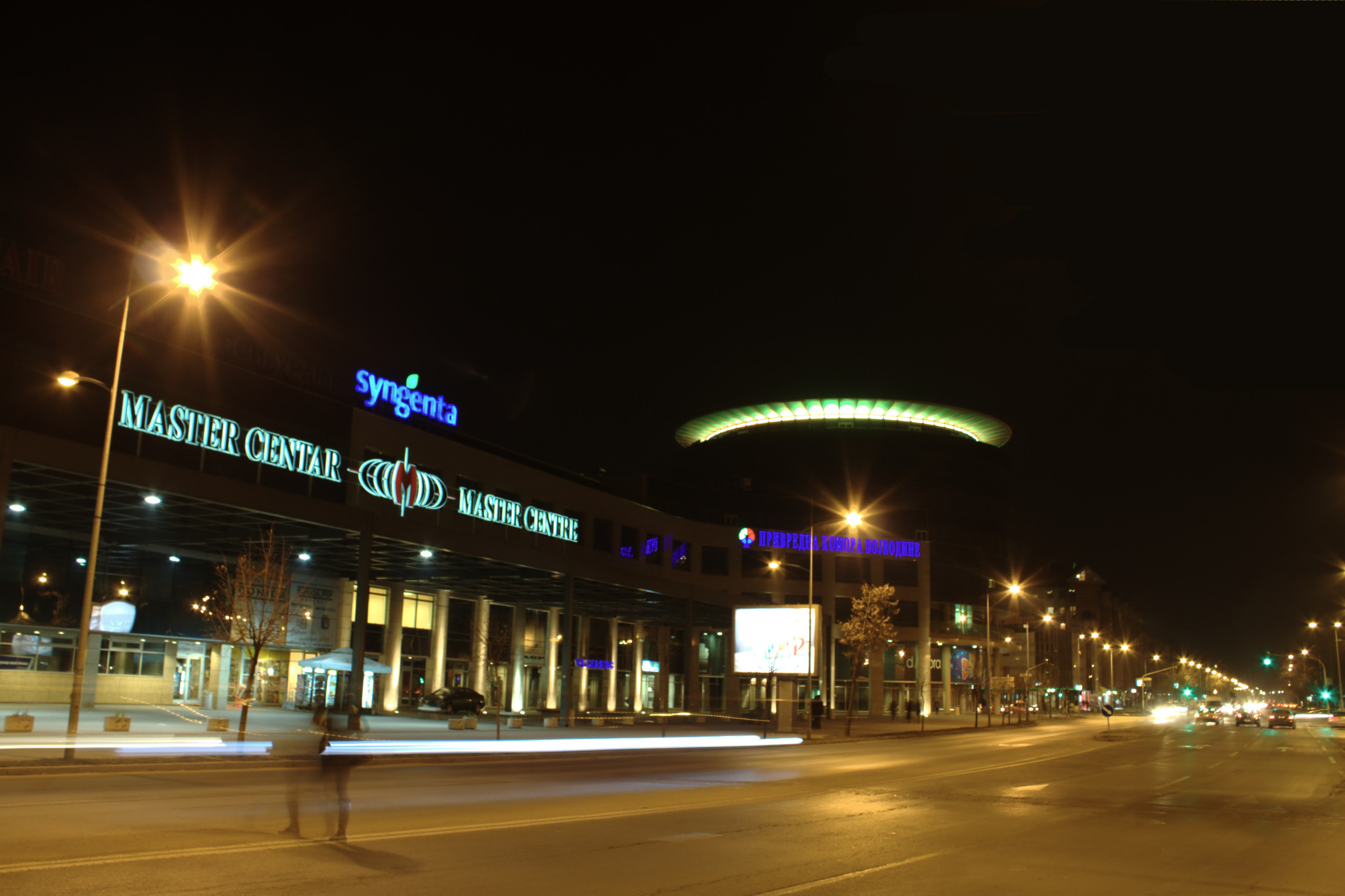
Novi Sad Fair at night

Novi Sad Fair owns a vast exhibition space, the size of the total area being 300,000 m² (240,000 m² outside and 60,000 m² inside). The company also has a newly built congress building, called the "Master Centre", which measures 2,700 m².

Novi Sad Fair is a member of The Global Association of the Exhibition Industry, International Congress & Convention Association, The Exhibition Association of Southeast Europe, World-Wide Business Centres Network, and Central European Fair Alliance.

== History ==
The city of Novi Sad was historically a popular place for traders. In the 19th century, it quickly became an important trading post, due to its location on the Danube river and on the natural border between the Bačka and Syrmia regions. Novi Sad is also situated in Vojvodina, Serbia, which at the time was the most developed agricultural region in the then Kingdom of Yugoslavia. It therefore became home to the country's first agricultural show in 1923, becoming international later on in 1930.

In 1958, Novi Sad Fair became a member of an international fair organization and also gained a reputation for being the most important agricultural show in the then SFR Yugoslavia. Besides organizing the annual agricultural show, the company had held many other fairs over the years, dedicated to finance, computing, banking, cars, books, pharmaceuticals, etc.

== Exhibitions and Fairs ==
	Type of event	Season
1	Media Fair	March
2	International Fair of Furniture and Interior Equipment 'Ambienta'	April
3	International Fair of Civil Engineering	April
4	International Fair of motorcycles, bicycles and accessories "Moto Bike EXPO – Novi Sad"	April
5	International Book Fair	April
6	International Fair of School and Office Equipment 'SCHOOL & OFFICE EXPO'	April
7	International Exhibition of Art 'ART EXPO'	April
8	International Agricultural Fair	May
9	International Fair of Medicine and Pharmacy 'PROMEDIKA'	June
10	Exhibition of Dentistry Equipment and Scientific-Professional Gathering 'PROMODENTIS – NOVI SAD'	June
11	International Fair of Hunting, Fishing and Sport	September
12	International Fair of Nautical Equipment	September
13	International Fair of Horticulture	September
14	International Fair 'Eko-Svet' – Ecology, Medical Herbs And Water	September
15	International Fair of Tourism	October
16	Hotelkeeping and Catering	October
17	Gastronomic Festival	October
18	'Car Show – Novi Sad'	October
19	Fair of Finance 'Finmar'	November
20	Fair of Investment	November
21	Power Supply, Electronics and Telecommunications	November
22	Fair of Logistics	November
23	Fair of Entrepreneurship	November
24	International Exhibition of Jewellery, Watches and Optics 'SJAJ'	November
25	New Year's Sales Fair of Consumer Goods	December

== See also ==
- Belgrade Fair
