= Boris Bizetić =

Serbian singer

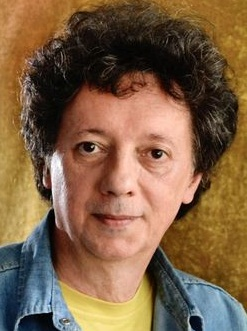
Boris Bizetić in 2019

Boris Bizetić (Serbian Cyrillic: Борис Бизетић) (born 28 November 1950 in Belgrade, Serbia) is a Serbian singer, songwriter and actor.

== Career ==
He founded and was one of the lead singers of the band Rokeri s Moravu. The band's music blended rock with folk influences, often with satirical lyrics. Bizetić wrote and arranged all of the songs for the band. Outside of his career with Rokeri s Moravu, he has written numerous songs for prominent musicians in Yugoslavia.
