= Duboka (Kučevo) =

Duboka rom. Adâncata
- Village
- Location within Serbia
- Coordinates: 44°31′17″N 21°45′39″E
- Country: Serbia
- District: Braničevo District
- Municipality: Kučevo

Population (2002)
  - Total: 1,110
- Time zone: UTC+1 (CET)
  - Summer (DST): UTC+2 (CEST)

Duboka (rom. Adâncata) is a village in the municipality of Kučevo (rom. Cuciova), Serbia. According to the 2002 census, the village has a population of 1110 people.
