= Rokeri s Moravu =

Serbian folk comedy band (1977–1991; 2006–2008)

Rokeri s Moravu (Serbian Cyrillic: Рокери с Мораву, lit. 'Rockers from the Morava') was a Yugoslav-Serbian folk and comedy band active from 1977 to 1991, with a brief revival between 2006 and 2008. Their music was a mix of Serbian folk music with rock elements and folksy, satirical lyrics in the village dialects of Šumadija and the Morava Valley, combined with numerous popular culture references. Their visual trademark were Serbian šajkača caps and opanci shoes, worn either with traditional dress and/or in crazy combinations with tuxedos, fur coats or A-shirts.

The band was formed in 1977 by Boris Bizetić, who wrote, composed and made musical arrangements for all Rokeri s Moravu's songs (more than 220) and who is also one of the lead singers of the band. The other lead singer was Zvonko Milenković. Two additional singers were Branislav Anđelović (who was also a guitar player) and Branko Janković. Branko Janković died in 1982 after a car accident. Branislav Anđelović left the band in 1988.

Rokeri recorded 19 studio albums from 1977 to 1991, when they stopped recording but continued having occasional live performances around Europe. Between 1988 and 1991 Rokeri released five VHS programs. During the 1990s they were active on television in several TV shows. The best-selling album was Krkenzi kikiriki from 1980. Their greatest hits include Turio Ljubiša pivo da se 'ladi, Ja Tarzan a ti Džejn, Stojadinka ovce šiša, Seks na eks... In 2005, 3 "best of" box sets of 2CDs each, titled Sabrana nedela (Collected misdeeds) was released. The following year their first DVD, with 30 previously unreleased music videos, came out. A comeback album, "Projekat", was released in 2006, recorded only by Boris Bizetić and Zvonko Milenković, with guest appearances by the famous folk singers Predrag Gojković Cune, Predrag Živković Tozovac and Lepa Lukić. This album was followed by DVD with 20 music videos that same year.

Zvonko Milenković died in September 2008.

== Discography ==
Albums
No.	Albums	Year
1.	Stojadinka ovce šiša	1978
2.	Drma, drma plovak	1979
3.	Moj crni Zivotije	1980
4.	Keskese	1981
5.	Ja Tarzan, a ti Džejn	1982
6.	Kobac juri male 'tice	1983
7.	Pomoravac	1984
8.	Dinastija	1984
9.	Cico, veštico	1985
10.	Međunarodni poljoprivredni ansambl	1986
11.	Rokeri s Moravu pevu u glas	1987
12.	Rokeri s Moravu pevu po kućama	1987
13.	Jugoslovenska ploča	1988
14.	Tajna večera	1989
15.	Pomozi bože	1990
16.	Srbija se umirit ne može	1990
17.	Nindže kornjače	1991
18.	Projekat	2006

== Quotes ==
Rokeri s Moravu are punk.

— Željko Bebek

I love to listen Rokeri s Moravu in my car.

— Željko Samardžić

I loved Rokeri s Moravu, and I still love them.

— Lepa Lukić
