= Belgrade Fair – Hall 1 =

Belgrade Fair's largest exhibition space

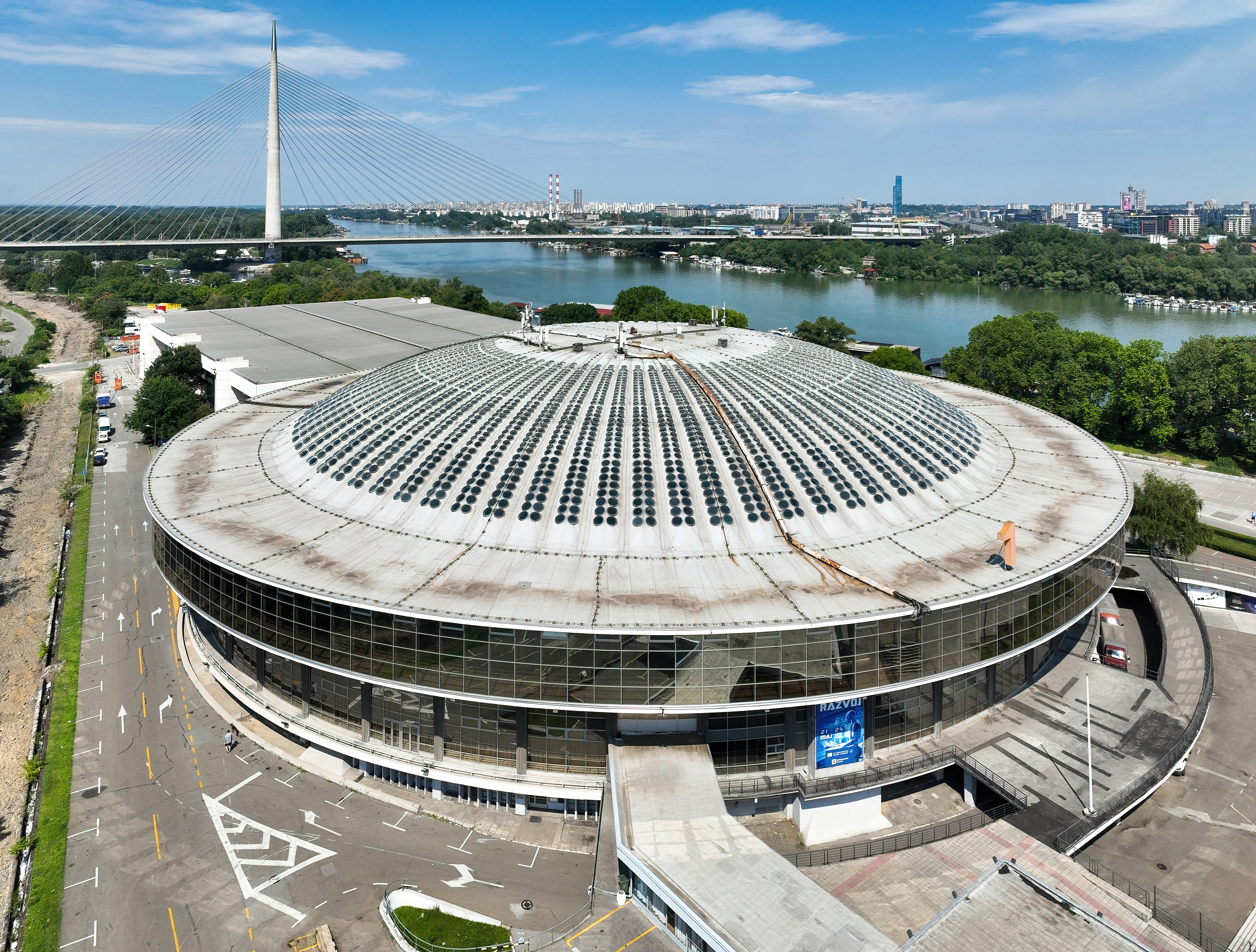
- Hall 1 in 2024.
- Interactive map of the Belgrade Fair – Hall 1 area

General information
- Type: Exhibition space
- Architectural style: Dome
- Location: Belgrade, Serbia
- Coordinates: 44°47′44″N 20°26′3″E
- Construction started: 1954
- Completed: 1957
- Opening: 1957

Technical details
- Structural system: Prestressed concrete

Design and construction
- Architects: Branko Žeželj and Milorad Pantović

The Belgrade Fair – Hall 1, is Belgrade Fair's largest exhibition space. The hall opened to the public in 1957. It was the world's largest dome between 1957 and 1965 and is Europe's largest dome.

== Construction ==
The Hall 1 is constructed between 1954 and 1957 by Branko Žeželj and Milorad Pantović. It is located on new Belgrade Fair ground on the right bank of the Sava River. It is circular in shape, covered by a dome spanning 109 m (358 ft), which is the largest dome in the world constructed by prestressed concrete.

The maximum ceiling height at the hall is 30.78 m. The hall has been constructed in levels: basement, arena, ground floor, 1st gallery, 2nd gallery and the connecting part toward the West Wing. All levels of the hall are used as exhibiting space, other than the basement, where offices, the hall warehouse and auxiliary facilities are located.

All external exhibiting space walls are made of glass from the floor level to the dome.

The hall total area is 21,280 sq. m., of which the exhibiting space 15,030 sq. m.

== Concerts ==
- January 6, January 9, February 13, 1966 - Gitarijada festival
- February 23, 1967 - Gitarijada festival
- April 9, 1983 - Riblja Čorba (Buvlja pijaca Tour. First concert in Hala 1 by any band after 16 years. Band's frontman Bora Đorđević made a public bet of cutting all of his trademark long hair if the band doesn't sell out the venue. He lost and followed through on his promise.)
- April 24, 1983 - Bijelo Dugme (Uspavanka za Radmilu M. Tour)
- January 26, 1984 - Eric Clapton (Money and Cigarettes Tour)
- August 18, 1984 - Iron Maiden (World Slavery Tour)
- March 8, 1985 - Bijelo Dugme (Kosovka devojka Tour)
- November 22, 1986 - Bajaga i Instruktori (Jahači magle Tour)
- April 10, 1987 - Riblja Čorba (Ujed za dušu Tour)
- December 3, 1988 - Riblja Čorba (Priča o ljubavi obično ugnjavi Tour)
- February 4, 1989 - Bijelo Dugme (Ćiribiribela Tour)
- July 21, 1990 - Alice Cooper (Trash Tour)
- February 5, 1991 - Iggy Pop (Brick by Brick Tour)
- April 30, 1994 - R'n'R Zauvek (Daltoni, Dejan Cukić, YU grupa, Generacija 5, Radomir Mihajlović Točak, Opera, Bjesovi, Galija, EKV, Partibrejkers, Električni Orgazam, Van Gogh, Leb i Sol, Kerber, Zabranjeno Pušenje, Riblja Čorba, Toni Montano, Rambo Amadeus, Babe) 30 years of Rock'n'Roll in Yugoslavia
- June 4, 1997 - Kiss (Alive/Worldwide Tour - "Once Wasn't Enough" European Leg, opening acts: Die Ärzte, Moonspell)
- December 31, 1999 - Džej Ramadanovski, Ana Bekuta, Era Ojdanić, and Alka Vuica
- December 31, 2000 - Riblja Čorba (guests: Prljavi Inspektor Blaža i Kljunovi)
- October 12, 2002 - Aca Lukas ("Može i bez Pinka")
- December 7, 2003 - Deep Purple (Bananas Tour, opening band: Cactus Jack)
- July 20, 2004 - P!nk (Try This Tour)
- January 21, 2005 - R.E.M. (Around the Sun Tour)
- May 29, 2005 - Vybe Festival (Faithless, Thievery Corporation, Darkwood Dub, E-Play, Vrooom, Jon DaSilva, X-Press 2, GusGus, DJ Marko Nastić, DJ Dejan Milićević)
- June 21, 2005 - Jamiroquai (Dynamite Tour)
- February 27, 2006 - Deep Purple (Rapture of the Deep tour)
- October 17, 2006 - Duran Duran (Astronaut Tour, opening band: Laki Pingvini)
- March 17, 2007 - Iron Maiden (A Matter of Life and Death Tour)
- May 21, 2011 - Sebastian Ingrosso

== See also ==
- Belgrade Fair
- List of world's largest domes
- List of buildings in Belgrade
