= Ritam (Novi Sad magazine) =

Yugoslav music magazine

- Editor-in-Chiefs: Mika Antić
- Categories: Music magazine
- Frequency: Semimonthly
- Publisher: Dnevnik
- Founded: 1962
- First issue: 1 October 1962
- Final issue: August 1965
- Country: Yugoslavia
- Language: Serbian

Ritam (Serbian Cyrillic: Ритам, trans. Rhythm) was a Yugoslav music magazine dedicated to jazz and popular music. Founded in 1962, Ritam was the first Yugoslav magazine which dealt with jazz as well as rock and pop music, thus paving the way for Yugoslav rock magazines like Džuboks and Pop Express.

== Background and history ==
Priror to publication of Ritam, there were several Yugoslav music magazines dedicated to jazz music. In the Kingdom of Yugoslavia, there were the magazine Svijet Jazza (The World of Jazz) and another magazine called Ritam, both founded in January 1941, and both discontinued in April of the same year due to Axis occupation of Yugoslavia. Following the 1948 Tito-Stalin split, the Socialist Federal Republic of Yugoslavia became more opened towards Western culture than other socialist countries in Europe, and saw the re-appearance of jazz press in early 1950s, with the magazine Jazz, founded in 1953 by the Association of Musicians, followed by Bilten udruženja džez muzičara (Association of Jazz Musicians Bulletin) and Savremeni akordi (Contemporary Chords).

Ritam magazine was founded in 1962 by publisher Dnevnik from Novi Sad, as the first Yugoslav magazine dedicated to jazz as well as popular music. The magazine's editor-in-chief was poet Miroslav "Mika" Antić. The first issue was released on 1 October 1 1962, with the inscription "Yugoslav magazine for jazz and popular music" under the magazine title. The price of an issue was 50 dinars. It was published semimonthly, on every 1st and 15th of the moth. The magazine was printed in black and white, in broadsheet format. Ritam published news, interviews, reviews and commentaries. The magazine also organized voting for most popular bands in Yugoslavia, with the winners gaining an opportunity to perform on the Parada ritma and Vatromet ritma music festivals. Before August 1965, when the magazine was discontinued, 39 issues have been released in total.

== Journalists and contributors ==
Some of the journalists and contributors to Ritam during its activity include:

- Dušan Bućan
- Ranka Čičak
- Pavle Kićevac
- Stevan Lanji
- Vukašin Pavlović
- Dušan Slavković
- Stevan Stanić
