= Belgrade Fair =

- Београдски Сајам; Beogradski Sajam
- Sajam
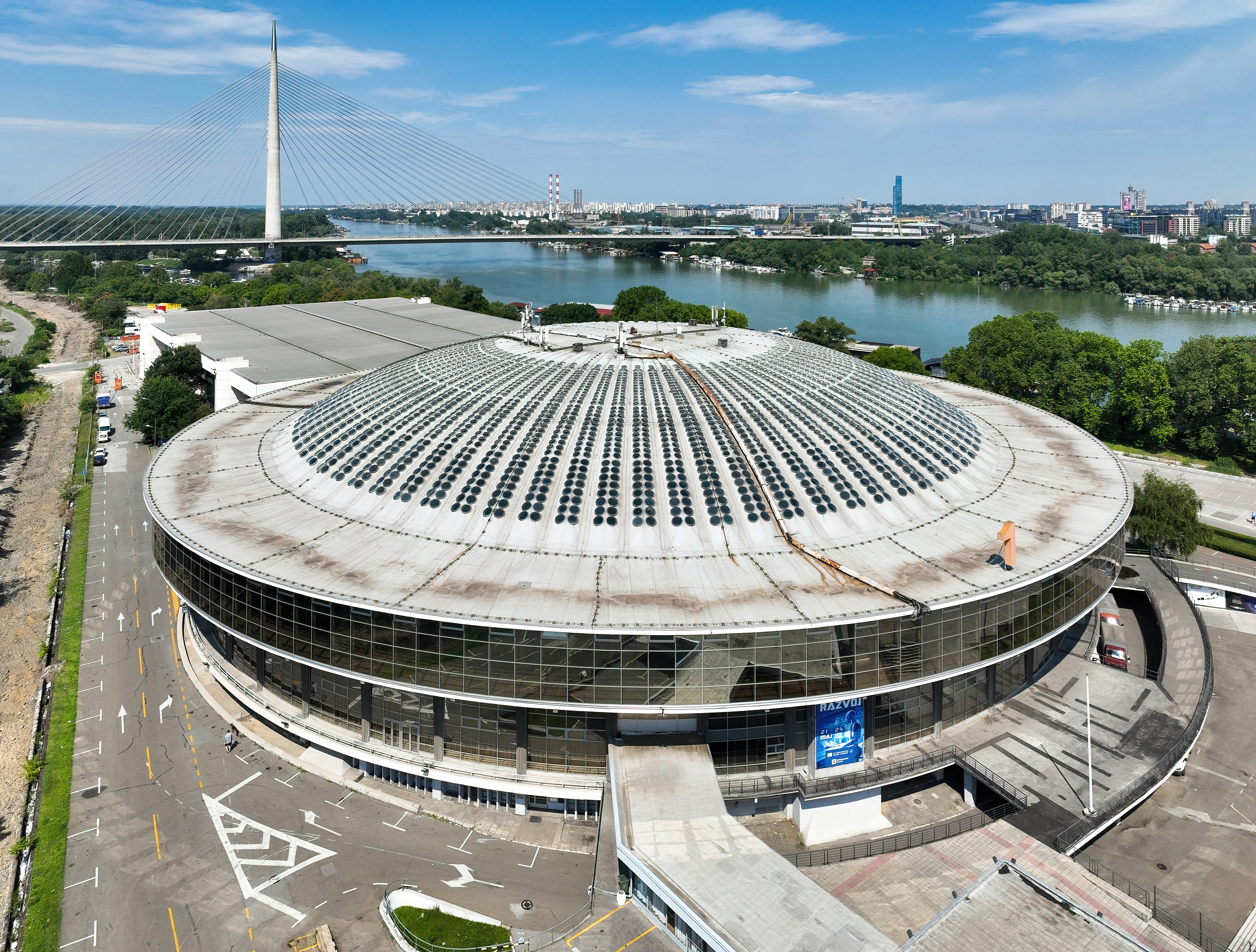
- Belgrade Fair – Hall 1
- Interactive map of Belgrade Fair
- Address: 14 Bulevar Vojvode Mišića
- Location: Savski Venac, Belgrade, Serbia
- Coordinates: 44°47′46″N 20°26′8″E
- Owner: City of Belgrade
- Capacity: 100,000 m^{2} (1,100,000 sq ft), 14 halls
- Surface: 24 ha (59 acres)

Construction
- Groundbreaking: June 1955
- Opened: 23 August 1957; 69 years ago
- Expanded: 1966–1967, 1975
- Architect: Milorad Pantović
- Structural engineer: Branko Žeželj

Website
- sajam.rs

The Belgrade Fair (Serbian: Београдски сајам, romanized: Beogradski sajam) is a large complex of three large domes and a dozen smaller halls which is a venue for major trade fairs in Belgrade, the capital of Serbia. The complex, colloquially referred to simply as the Sajam, is located in the municipality of Savski Venac, on the right bank of the Sava river, and is one of the most recognizable landmarks in the city.

== Location ==
The Sajam is located on the Sava's right bank, at the edge of the western foothills of Topčidersko Brdo and the neighborhood of Senjak. The Topčiderka river flows into the Sava, at the Bay of Čukarica, just south of the fair complex, while Novi Beograd and the peninsula of Mala Ciganlija are just across the Sava, which is here at its the narrowest (200 m (660 ft)).

== History ==
=== Origin ===
Originally, an exhibition space was first built as modern complex in what is now the neighbourhood of Sajmište in Novi Beograd, across the Sava, and was opened on 11 November 1937. Since it had served as the Sajmište concentration camp during World War II, it was not rebuilt after 1945. The city authorities selected three potential locations for a new trade fair venue and, in 1953, the location of Šest Topola ("Six Poplars"), at the westernmost edge of the neighborhood of Bara Venecija, a former beach and popular bathing spot on the right bank of the Sava, was chosen. This was confirmed by the city administration's decision of 13 May 1953.

=== Construction ===
An architectural design competition was organized and the jury selected a project by architects Vladeta Maksimović and Milorad Pantović. However, the city authorities took a dislike to the project and requested a more modern approach. Pantović had worked in New York, Paris, and London prior to World War II and the Sajam was his first project to be realized in Yugoslavia, so he was charged with visiting European trade fairs and proposing something completely different from the architecture seen in Belgrade up to that point. The political climate changed in Yugoslavia in the 1950s, as the state broke ties with the Soviet Union. This brought to the ending the period of Socialist realism in Yugoslav architecture and the state sought to present itself as modern, progressive and open to the world. Pantović was then, to all intents and purposes, given a carte blanche in choosing the modernist design.

Construction began in June 1955. Engineers Branko Žeželj and Milan Krstić joined the designing-construction team. Architect Olga Divac was appointed as the head of the company "Belgrade Fair in Construction" which built the complex. Building of the massive domed halls, especially of the largest one, was a daunting task and drew attention from world architects and engineers. They were made of prestressed concrete. Since then, the pre-war Sajmište became known as Staro Sajmište ("old trade fair").

=== Later development ===
First exhibition premiered on 23 August 1957 and already from that year, Belgrade Fair was member of the UFI. The inaugural fair was the International Exhibition of Technics, with 1,500 exhibitors from 28 states. In 11 days it had 1,150,000 visitors, or 2 times more than Belgrade had inhabitants at the time. After only several fair exhibitions, the monumental and costly project paid off itself and became the display window for Yugoslav economy.

The very first broadcast of the Radio Television Belgrade (Dnevnik ("Journal") news program), was aired from Sajam on 23 August 1958, at 20:00. It marked 20 years since the television technology was exhibited by the Philips at the pre-war 1938 fair in Staro Sajmište. Basketball player Radivoj Korać set the EuroLeague's all-time single-game scoring record of 99 points on 15 January 1965, when the match OKK Beograd-Alvik Basket was held in Sajam during the FIBA European Champions Cup 1964–65 season.

Second phase of the expansion of the complex began in 1966. Halls 7, 8 and 9 were built, but during the first exhibition held in them in the fall of 1966, they burned in fire. They were rebuilt in 1967, when the halls 10, 11 and 12 were also finished. The last phase was finished in 1975 when the western wing of the Hall 1, later renamed Hall 14 and today Hall 4, was finished.

In 1961 the fair hosted two European sports championships: 1961 European Amateur Boxing Championships and, few months later, EuroBasket 1961. Both were held in the Hall 1. The same hall hosted the first major concert of the "youth culture and rock and roll" in Yugoslavia in 1966, with over 100 bands. Since then, the hall became a favorite venue for the "urban musical guerrilla", but also for the popular mainstream rock musicians. Concerts were held by Ekatarina Velika, Yu Grupa, Bajaga i Instruktori, Riblja Čorba. Foreign musicians include Eric Clapton (in 1984), Iron Maiden (1984, 2007), Deep Purple (2003, 2006), Alice Cooper, Kiss, Duran Duran, etc. Occasionally, Serbian folk singers were also performing in the Hall 1, like Džej Ramadanovski (1992; 30,000 spectators).

During the COVID-19 pandemic in Serbia, Belgrade Fair is used as a vaccination center for the citizens of Serbia and foreigners. It was opened on 25 January 2021 that consisting of 24 medical check-ups booths and 28 vaccination booths in Hall 3.

In October 2021, deputy mayor Goran Vesić announced relocation of the fairs from the complex, and demolition of all structures except the protected Hall 1 due to the expansion of the Belgrade Waterfront project. In November 2022 the plans for the relocation to the suburb of Surčin, next to the planned new national stadium. were announced. After Belgrade's application to host the Expo 2027 (and later confirmation), city manager Miroslav Čučković in April 2023 confirmed demolition of the fair in the next five years and construction of the much larger new complex in Surčin. The surviving Hall 1 will be turned into the "creative center".

Urbanist Iva Čukić said that this means nothing as numerous structures were declared "creative centers" which were never built, especially given the fact that "Belgrade Waterfront...from day one dictates the plan...and can do literally whatever it wants, even outside of the jurisdiction already handed over to them", concluding that the Sava's bank becomes a location of exclusive residence, inaccessible to all citizens. Architect and former chief city urbanist, Đorđe Bobić, said that "Belgrade Waterfront is metastasizing...spreading in the Fair's direction" He, and other experts stated that all four large halls should be kept. Though some architects are not against the relocation of the shows, they are against the demolition. Čukić noted that the new complex, on 113 ha (280 acres) with high construction costs due to the lack of existing infrastructure, will be unprofitable "already from 2028", as there is no content that could keep it financially viable. Bobić said that the old fair could host EXPO 2027, too, that construction of such magnitude for the three months long manifestation is u8necessary, and that facilities will probably end up mostly abanodned, like similar complexes in Italy and Germany.

In July 2023, architectural renderings of the future complex instead of the fair was announced by the Irish architectural bureau "NMP" ("Niall Montgomery + Partners"). It shows blocks of buildings surrounding the remaining Hall 1. They described it as an extension of the Belgrade Waterfront's Sava promenade and as the "world class cultural-ecological destination" with artistic center, parks, redesigned Old Railway Bridge, and Ferris wheel. The "NMP" already designed some parts of Belgrade Waterfront. The company refused to respond to Serbian media and deleted renderings from its site. Construction of the new fairground in Surčin was awarded, also without competition, to the Spanish bureau "Fenwick Iribarren Architects", which also already worked with the Serbian government.

In June 2023, the Belgrade Fair Company decided to reduce its own value of capital from RSD1.56 billion (€13.3 million) to RSD0.42 billion (€3.5 million), which was approved by the government. The reason was the change of company's status. The company relinquished all of its land and structures to the state, which additionally stripped company even of the right of use of the premises. By the time it became public that Belgrade Fair was stripped of everything, the venue was already sold on 16 March 2023, as disclosed by the President of Serbia Aleksandar Vučić in August 2023. First, the state owned company was founded to which the land was transferred, which was then sold as company's "share" to Belgrade Waterfront Company, majority (68%) owned by the investors from the United Arab Emirates.

It was not known that the company was founded, and the land transferred from one company to another to third. The contract with Belgrade Waterfront was not made public, nor the price was disclosed (the estimated worth of the land was €50 million). The land was never publicly offered for sale, the ownership change is not recorded in state's cadaster service, nor changes in the worth of Belgrade Waterfront at the state's Business Registers Agency. Both the government and the president refused to disclose any business data with president adding that "somewhere there we will make that big wheel, that thing that all cities have" and that state retains "100% of ownership of this hall here". "Public space" will cover 62% of the planned area (but only 6% of green areas), while 38% will be under the structures. Total area is 33 ha (82 acres)

Serbian branch of Transparency International said the fairground was sold via an unknown procedure, non-transparently and without publicly given reason for it. The contract with Belgrade Waterfront was not published among the state documents, nor on the site of the State Assets Directory. It is also not disclosed what the Arab investors bring into the new company and who remains the owner of the land. It was also pointed out that the repurposing of the fairground's land solely by the Belgrade Waterfront's project itself, designed by Mirjana Stupar, is illegal.

== Transportation ==
Area in the vicinity of the Sajam is among the busiest transportation sections of Belgrade. Entire complex is surrounded by the railways and both railway bridges over the Sava which connect old and new sections of Belgrade, are crossing the river at Sajam: old bridge, right on the northern tip, and new bridge which rises above the Sajam itself. "Boulevard of Vojvoda Mišić" which runs next to the complex is a major route which connects outer neighborhoods like Banovo Brdo, Čukarica, Žarkovo, Košutnjak and Topčider, and thus one of the busiest single streets in Belgrade, well known for daily traffic jams. Just north of the Sajam is a highway and one of the largest interchanges in Belgrade, Mostarska Petlja, and a Gazela bridge over the Sava. Additionally, the tram lines are passing through the boulevard, too, and the very first tram line in Belgrade passed through this area (Gospodarska Mehana), connecting Kalemegdan and Senjak.

== Characteristics ==
=== Architecture ===
By adopting the spherical shapes of the halls, the imposing interior spaces were formed, clean, free from brackets and pillars, without dead angles, without blind spots, filled with light, conducting the idea of the unified space roofed by the cupola alluding the celestial sphere. Biljana Mašić on Pantović's design

The fairground was built as the contemporary urban complex, with the accent of the entire composition of object being on three exhibition pavilions under the domes which are interconnected via enclosed walkways. Though the domes were designed in the most modern spirit of the European architecture of the day, not to mention the "futuristic" construction process, architect Pantović also applied the appearance of the traditional circular cupola's from the Byzantine architecture.

The Belgrade Fair is the largest institution of its kind in Serbia, covering an area of 24 ha (59 acres). All together, it has 14 halls which cover an exhibition area of 100,000 m^{2} (1,100,000 sq ft), dominated by the three large domes: Hall 1 (largest hall with 109 m (358 ft) diameter dome with a combined area of 32,945 m^{2} (354,620 sq ft), or one third of the total area; it was the largest dome in the world 1957-1965 and largest Euoropean dome, Hall 2 and Hall 3. Belgrade Fair also has commercial space, depositories, and workhouses. Additional services include post office, bank, tourist agencies, carrier companies, custom, and ambulance. Also, within Fair there are several important hosting object of various purposes.

=== Exhibitions ===
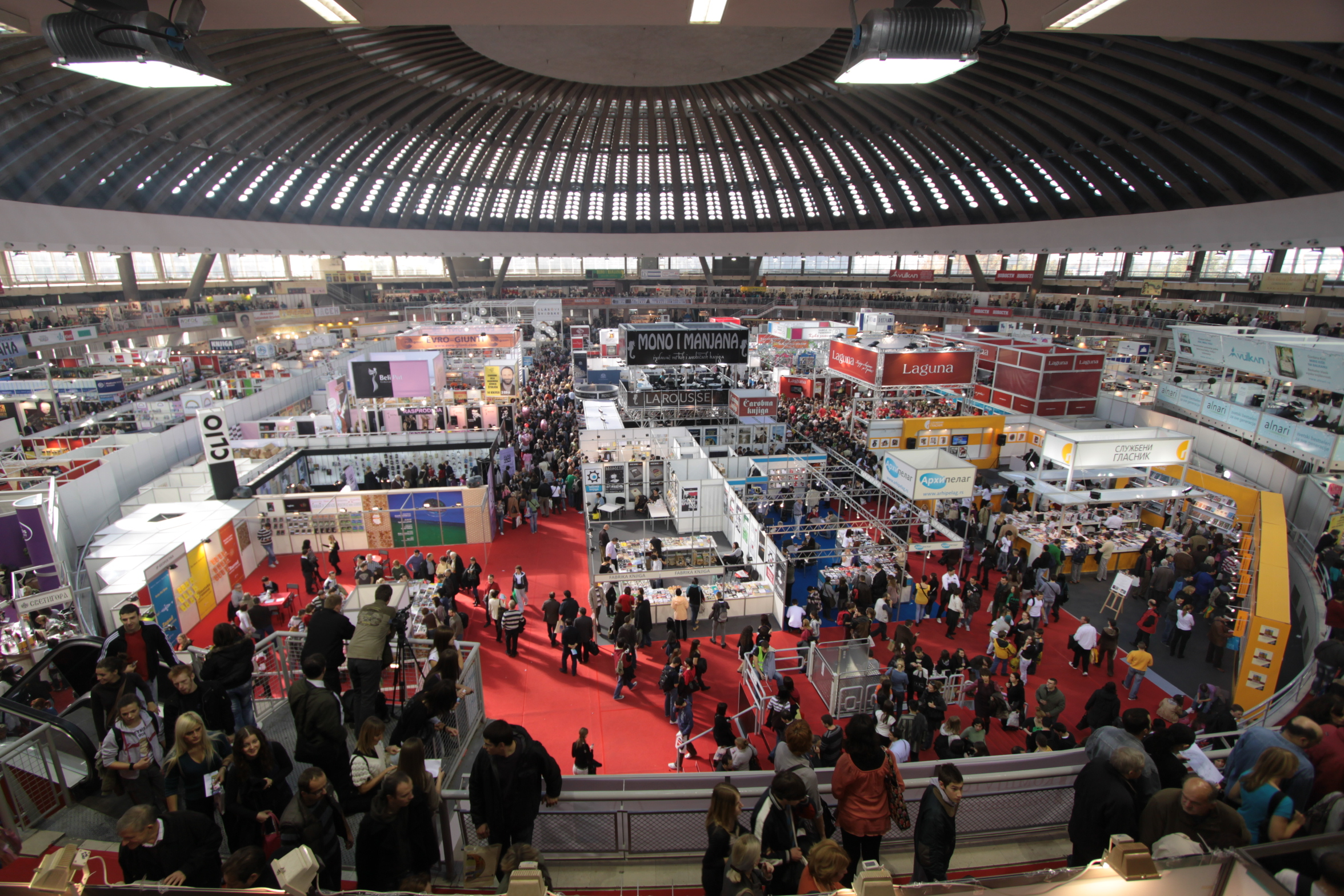
2011 Belgrade Book Fair

Every year Belgrade Fair hosts over 30 regular international fair manifestations. Over 5,000 companies exhibit on the Belgrade Fair annually, with more than 1.500,000 visitors Many of these manifestations are members of respectable international organizations: the International Fair of Technique and Technical Advancements, International Fair of Clothing - World Fashion, International Fair of Furniture, Equipment and Internal Decorations, and SEEBBE (Southeast Europe Building Belgrade Expo) are members of UFI, Paris. International fair "BG CAR SHOW – MOTOPASSION" is one of the eighteen registered centers for presentation of European automobile industry by OICA, Paris.

In addition to regular manifestations, domes of Belgrade Fair host numerous other exhibitions, concerts, scientific and specialized meetings and the range of services of the Belgrade Fair is supported by bazaar of consumer goods. Since 2001, the Belgrade Fair is a member of CEFA (Central European Fair Association) and since September 2003, the International Fair of Tourism is a member of ETTFA.

== Protection ==
City and Republic institutes for the cultural monuments protection are working jointly on a proposal to put Sajam under the state protection. In January 2009 the government declared the entire complex a cultural monument, but then revoked its own decision a week later. The government revoked it as the placing of the entire complex would hamper the plans to privatize the venue. Instead, a month later, only the Hall 1 was protected by the state and declared a cultural monument.

== See also ==
- Novi Sad Fair
- Belgrade Book Fair

Preceded by İnönü Stadium; Istanbul	EuroBasket; Final Venue; 1961	Succeeded by Centennial Hall; Wrocław
