= Đorđe Marjanović =

Serbian singer (1931–2021)

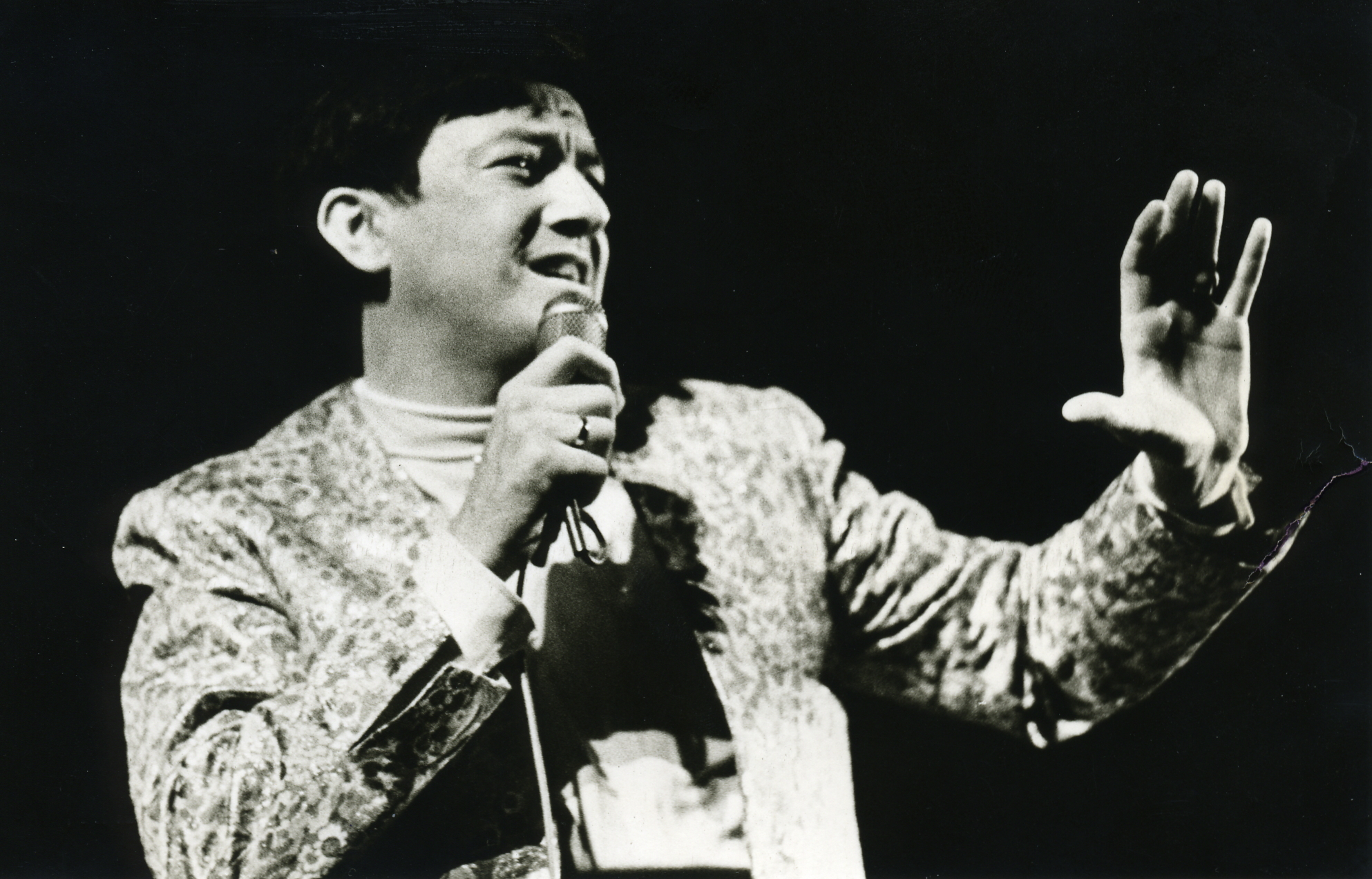
- Marjanović in 1966

Background information
- Born: 30 October 1931; Kučevo, Yugoslavia (now Serbia)
- Origin: Belgrade, Serbia
- Died: 15 May 2021 (aged 89) Belgrade, Serbia
- Genres: Schlager; chanson; pop; rock and roll; rock
- Occupation: Singer
- Instrument: Vocals
- Years active: 1954–1990
- Labels: Jugoton, Electrorecord, PGP-RTB, Studio B, PGP-RTS, Hi-Fi Centar

Đorđe Marjanović (Serbian Cyrillic: Ђорђе Марјановић; 30 October 1931 – 15 May 2021) was a Serbian and Yugoslav singer.

Marjanović began his career in the mid-1950s, rising to fame in the late 1950s with his theatrical on-stage performance. During the 1960s he recorded a large number of hit songs and became the first superstar of the Yugoslav popular music, but also achieved large popularity in the Soviet Union. Due to his on-stage performance and inclusion of foreign rock and roll hits into his repertoire, Marjanović was often described as one of the pioneers of the Yugoslav rock scene. During the 1970s and 1980s he managed to maintain a loyal fanbase. In 1990, he suffered a stroke on stage, from which he partially recovered, but decided to retire from the scene.

He died in 2021, aged 89 from COVID-19.

== Early biography ==
Đorđe Marjanović's father, Sveta Marjanović, was born in the village of Duboka, near the town Kučevo in Eastern Serbia. He attended high school in Požarevac, and when he was fifteen, he was among the civilians who followed the Serbian Army on its retreat through Albania. He was among the young men which the Serbian government in exile in Greece sent to the United Kingdom to receive education. He graduated from George Heriot's School and started his studies at the Manchester Metropolitan University, but returned home without graduating. He graduated from the Export Academy in Zagreb and returned to Kučevo, where he started working as a bank clerk.

Đorđe Marjanović was born on 30 October 1931 in Kučevo. His mother died when he was only nine months old. After the death of his wife, Marjanović's father left the child with his wife's mother, who would raise him. Marjanović had a sister, Ljiljana, and a half-brother from his father's second marriage, Vojislav.

Marjanović attended high school in Požarevac. During high school years, he showed interest in theatre, directing and acting in his own plays. After graduating from high school, he moved to Belgrade, where he, in 1950, after grandmother's wish, started his studies of pharmacy. However, his grandmother died, and Marjanović was left without any funds to continue his studies. To earn money he did various jobs: he unloaded freight cars on railroad stations, worked as a subscription collector for Radio Belgrade, worked as a milkman, and appeared as a background actor in Yugoslav Drama Theatre and in several Yugoslav films: Svi na more (Everybody to the Seaside), Anikina vremena (Anika's Time), Sumnjivo lice (Suspicious Person), Pesma sa Kumbare (The Song from Kumbara). Despite his efforts, he never finished his studies.

== Musical career ==
=== Early career ===
Marjanović started his musical career in 1954, when he appeared on an audition for amateur singers, organized by the Association of Jazz Musicians of Serbia, singing the songs "Mulen ruž" ("Moulin Rouge") and "Usamljeni gaučo" ("The Lonely Gaucho"). Reputedly, wandering the streets of Belgrade, Marjanović met an acquaintance who was going to the audition and asked Marjanović to keep him company. When they arrived at the audition, it was almost at its end. Someone invited all the people waiting, including Marjanović, who did not get a chance to say he did not come for the audition. He decided to try to sing. After the audition, he was approached by Radio Belgrade host Dušan Vidak, who told him that he passed. This gave Marjanović an opportunity to perform on concerts organized by the Association of Jazz Musicians of Serbia.

During the following years, Marjanović would appear on pop concerts featuring him and other singers, usually performing songs originally recorded by Yugoslav schlager singers Duško Jakšić, Bruno Petrali and Ivo Robić. At the end of 1957, he started performing the song "Zvižduk u 8" ("Whistle at 8 O'clock"), written by Darko Kraljić in the early 1950s, but not performed by any other singer before Marjanović. This song would later become one of his biggest hits and trademark songs.

During these years, Marjanović became the first Yugoslav pop singer to include theatrical moves into his performance and to dance on stage, the first Yugoslav pop singer to take the microphone off the stand and walk with it down from the stage and into the audience, and the first to take off his jacket and throw it into the audience.

=== Late 1950s and 1960s: Rise to fame, nationwide popularity and success in Soviet Union ===
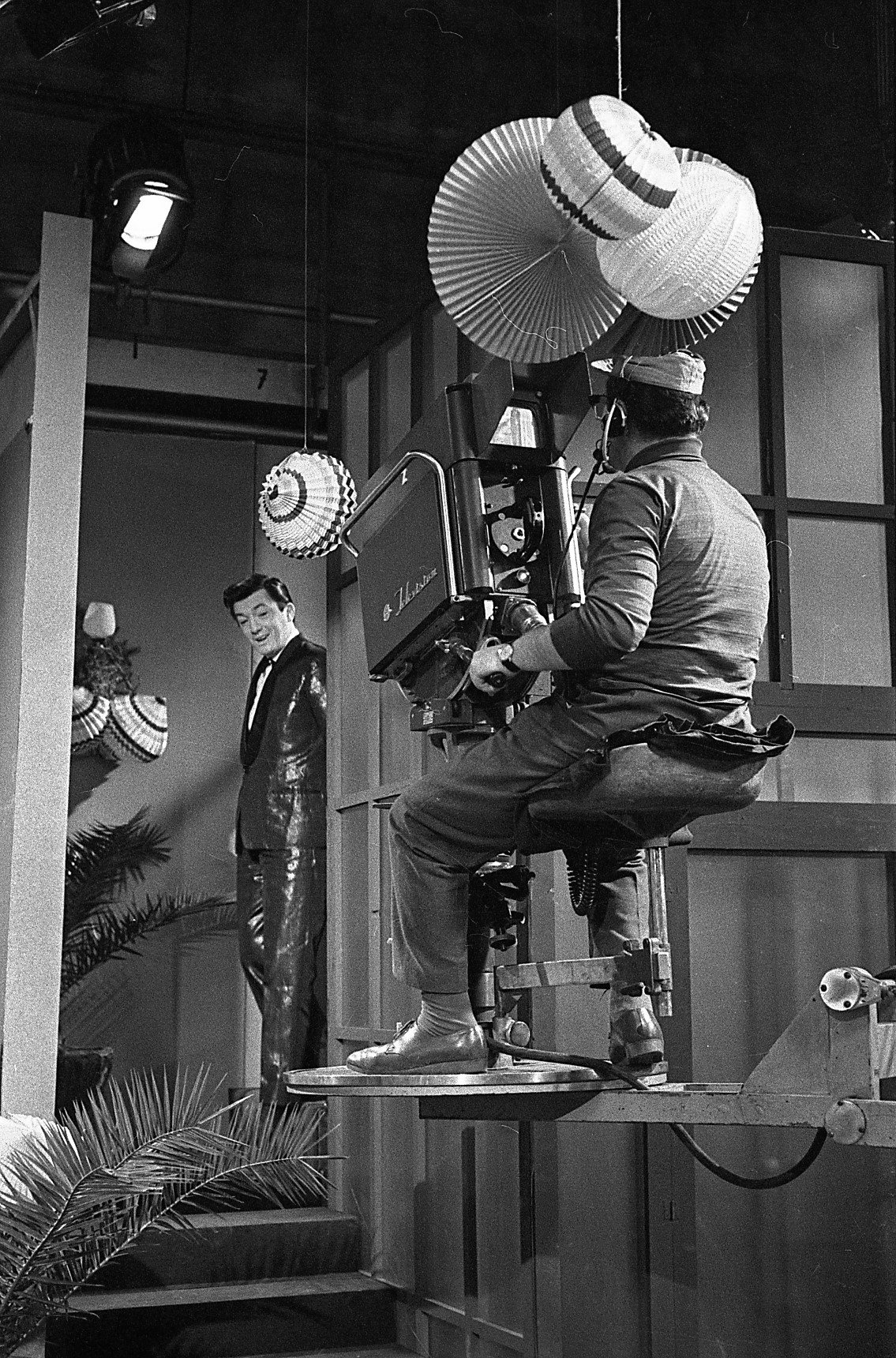
Marjanović in fall 1963, taping his part for the Dugme za peti sprat (Fifth Floor Button) New Year television special that aired as part of TV Belgrade's 1964 New Year's Eve lineup

The crucial moment of Marjanović's career was his performance on a 1958 concert in Niš. He appeared as an outsider, but thrilled the audience with his theatrical performance. This event brought him attention of the media and audience across Yugoslavia. He was gaining more fans across the country, but saw criticism by a part of the media, which criticized his lack of vocal skills and his "clownish behavior" with which he, as one of the papers wrote, "reminded of tasteless moves of some domestic singers in their pitiable imitation of the West". The editors of Radio Belgrade refused to invite Marjanović to perform in their live program. Despite all that, the primo uomo of Belgrade Opera Darko Pivnički, who worked with young talents, decided to give singing lessons to Marjanović for free.

The large popularity Marjanović enjoyed enabled him to record his first release, the album Muzika za igru (Music for Dancing). Marjanović recorded the album with the band Plavi Ansambl (The Blue Ensemble), which at the time consisted of Eduard Sađil (tenor saxophone), Petar Sam (accordion), Tripo Simonuti (violin), Đorđe Debač (piano), Vladimir Vitas (vibraphone), Sveta Jakovljević (guitar), Milan Mihajlović (double bass), Aleksandar Kosanović (drums) and Rade Jovanović (bongo drums). The album was released on Marjanović's birthday, 30 October. At the time of its release, Marjanović was serving his mandatory army stint in Ljubljana. Released by PGP-RTB record label in 1959, Muzika za igru was the first popular music album released by the label and the first popular music solo album released in Serbia. The song "Zvižduk u 8" was the album's biggest hit. The first printing of the record was sold within a month.

After his return from the army, Marjanović appeared at the Opatija Music Festival with the songs "Prodavac novina" ("Newspaper Seller") and "Pesma raznosača mleka" ("The Milkman Song"), winning three awards. In March 1961, his performance on a Zlatni mikrofon (Golden Microphone) festival in Belgrade's Trade Union Hall caused a media scandal and what is often described as the first post-WWII street protest in Belgrade. The festival featured leading pop singers of Yugoslavia; Marjanović decided to appear on the festival performing the songs "Zvižduk u 8" and "Milord" (a cover of Édith Piaf's "Milord"). However, he was soon instructed to pick another song instead of "Milord"; it was explained to him that "Milord" is "too dramatic" and that it would "hinder the jury in making an objective decision". Marjanović decided to perform the song "Carolina, dai!", which was two months earlier performed at the eleventh Sanremo Music Festival. The festival jury should have awarded five Golden Microphone Awards to five singers; however, they decided there are not enough singers worthy of the award. Their decision was to award only three Golden Microphones, to Lola Novaković, Nada Knežević and Anica Zubović. After the announcer Dušan Vidak read the jury's decision and the names of the awarded singers, the audience got enraged by the fact that Marjanović was not among them. The audience started booing, chanting Marjanović's name and leaving the Hall, while the confused announcer proclaimed that the radio and television transmission had to be interrupted due to technical problems. This caused a large number of people to go out of their homes and go towards the Hall to see what was really happening. About 7,000 people gathered in front of the Hall. Some time after midnight, Marjanović tried to slip away through the back door of the Hall. After spotting him, the crowd carried him on their hands to an automobile parked in front of Hotel Moskva. There they placed him on the roof of the car, where he started singing. The audience sang with him for the next two hours, while the traffic stood still.

After this event, screenwriters Ljubiša Kozomara, Gordan Mihić and Milan Milićević Lango and film director Sava Mrmak recorded the comedy film Zvižduk u 8, starring Marjanović. The film was panned by the film critics, but had huge success with the audience. Concurrently with the film release, Marjanović held eleven sold-out concerts in a row in the Trade Union Hall. On his concerts he sang, danced and spoke poetry. For one of the concerts he received a letter from the First Lady of Yugoslavia, Jovanka Broz, which stated: "Dear Đorđe, please excuse me for not being able to attend your concert." He dedicated a part of one of the concerts to rock and roll. He appeared on the stage dressed in leather, inspired by the image of Gene Vincent, performing foreign rock and roll hits. In this part of the concert he was accompanied by the members of the newly formed beat band Siluete.

In 1962, Marjanović released his second studio album, Mustafa, through PGP-RTB. He recorded the album with Plavi Ansambl and Predrag Ivanović Quartet. The album consisted of covers of foreign hits, with the title track being a cover of Bob Azzam's "Mustapha". The Serbo-Croatian lyrics for the songs were written mostly by Marjanović himself. In 1962 he appeared on the Belgrade Spring Festival, performing the song "Stjuardjesa" ("Stewardess"), which became another one of his hits.

The new stage of his career started in 1963, when he went on his first Soviet Union tour. The Soviet audience, uncustomary with the stage performance resembling the performances of Western singers, accepted him immediately. He soon achieved large popularity in Soviet Union and started regularly going on Soviet Union tours. At the peak of his popularity in the Soviet Union he held fifteen concerts in a row at the Lenin Stadium in Moscow, performing every evening in front of approximately 15,000 people. During his tours in Soviet Union he performed French chansons, Italian canzones, but also covers of songs by Bob Dylan, The Beatles, The Mamas & the Papas, The Animals and other rock acts. He was awarded for "empowerment of friendly relations between Soviet and Yugoslav youth" and in 1968 he was proclaimed an Honorary Member of Komsomol.

During the 1960s, Marjanović remained one of the most popular singers in Yugoslavia, releasing hit songs "Potraži me u pregrađu" ("Search for Me in the Suburbs"), "Da čekić imam ja" ("If I Had a Hammer"), "Medison u Meksiko" ("Madison in Mexico"), "Romana" and others. During the decade, he also had several appearances at the Sanremo Music Festival.

=== 1970s and 1980s, retirement ===
During the 1970s and 1980s, Marjanović's career moved in three main directions: he appeared on pop music festivals, held concerts in Trade Union Hall, where he performed for his faithful fans, nicknamed "Đokists" by the media, and held Soviet Union tours. In 1972, he was awarded the Order of Labor with Silver Wreath by the president of Yugoslavia Josip Broz Tito. In 1979 he released the album Hvala vam, prijatelji (Thank You, Friends), which featured songs written for Marjanović by various authors: "Zima u Budimpešti" ("Winter in Budapest"), written by Đorđe Balašević, "Moje ludo srce" ("My Crazy Heart"), written by Mladen Vranešević, "Maestro", written by Vojkan Borisavljević, "Gramatika srca" ("Grammar of the Heart"), composed by Aleksandar Korać and with lyrics written by Dušan Radović, "Aerodrom" ("Airport") and "Samo dugme na kaputu" ("Just a Button on the Coat"), both composed by Kornelije Kovač and with lyrics written by Bora Đorđević, and others. On a 1982 concert in the Trade Union Hall the audience by voting chose the songs to be released on the 1982 album Dvadeset nikada više (Twenty Never Again). In 1989, to mark the 30th anniversary of Marjanović's debut release, PGP-RTB released the songs from Muzika za igru and Mustafa on the compilation album Milord za sva vremena (Milord for Eternity). During these two decades, he also performed in France, Germany, Israel, Australia and the United States of America.

In 1990 Marjanović was awarded by the Order of Friendship of Peoples by Soviet head of state Mikhail Gorbachev. Later that year, Marjanović made a guest appearance on Lepa Brena concert in Melbourne. While performing the song "Mene nema ko da žali" ("There's No One to Feel Sorry for Me"), he suffered a stroke. After the stroke he had difficulty speaking. He partially recovered, but decided to retire from the scene. During the following decades up until his death, Marjanović did not record new material and would appear live occasionally only, usually as a guest on festivals and other musicians' concerts.

== Personal life and death ==
Marjanović married twice. With his first wife, Zlata, he had no children, and with his second wife, Eli Nikolajevna Borisenko, he had three children: daughters Natalija and Nevena and son Marko. Both of his daughters graduated from the Belgrade Faculty of Music Arts.

After his retirement from the scene, Marjanović lived in Belgrade, occasionally residing in Kučevo. He died on 15 May 2021, aged 89, in Belgrade. Initially, Serbian media reported that he died due to complications caused by COVID-19, although one of his daughters later stated that he actually died of old age. He was buried at the Alley of Distinguished Citizens in the Belgrade New Cemetery. On 28 June (Serbian national holiday Vidovdan) 2021, he was posthumously awarded the 1st class Order of Karađorđe's Star by the President of Serbia.

== Legacy ==
Đorđe Marjanović is a marvel that occurred in Yugoslav culture and deserves volumes and volumes of books. Đorđe was the first rocker of this region, maybe not by the content of his songs, but by his approach to every one of his performances, by his manners and by his attitude towards the people who came to listen to him. Everyone was both the performer and the member of the audience, there wasn't the fourth wall, there was only faith and immense love wherever Đorđe appeared. It is out of place to compare Đorđe to anyone, because he is unique.

— Bora Đorđević in 2003

In 1994, a concert entitled Rokeri Đorđu Marjanoviću (Rockers to Đorđe Marjanović) was held in Trade Union Hall. The concert featured Dejan Cukić, Milan Delčić, Žika Milenković, Ruž, Rambo Amadeus and other acts performing Marjanović's songs. In 1999, Radio Television of Serbia broadcast a documentary about Marjanović, entitled K'o nekad u osam ("Like Before at Eight O'clock") after a verse from "Zvižduk u 8".

Marjanović's song "Lutka koja kaže ne" ("The Doll Which Says No") was covered by Yugoslav rock supergroup Vlada, Gile, Piko & Švaba in 1991 on the album entitled Lutka koja kaže ne. The song "Zvižduk u 8" was covered by Serbian and Yugoslav rock singer Toni Montano in 1991. The same song was covered by Serbian and Yugoslav rock singer Dejan Cukić in 1996. Marjanović's version of Dionysis Savvopoulos song "Dirlada" was covered by Serbian and Yugoslav rock musician Milan Delčić in 1994. Marjanović's song "Đavoli" ("Devils") was covered in 1999 by Serbian alternative rock band Jarboli. The song "Beograde" ("(Oh,) Belgrade") was covered by Croatian and Yugoslav alternative rock band Let 3 in 2005.

In 2006, the song "Zvižduk u 8" polled No.31 in the B92 Top 100 Domestic Songs list.

== Awards and honors ==
- Honorary Member of Komsomol (1968)
- Golden Ring of Sisak (1971)
- Order of Labor with Silver Wreath (1972)
- Silver Plaque of Kučevo (1978)
- MESAM Festival Grand Prix (1989)
- Order of Friendship of Peoples (1990)
- Slavianski Bazaar Lifetime Achievement Award (1996)
- Association of Musicians of Serbia Lifetime Achievement Award (1988)
- Sunčane Skale Golden Mermaid Lifetime Achievement Award (2000)
- 1st class Order of Karađorđe's Star (posthumously, 2021)

== Discography ==
=== Studio albums ===
- Muzika za igru (1959)
- Mustafa (1962)
- Prijatelji, zdravo! (1967)
- A život teče dalje (1975)
- Hvala vam, prijatelji (1979)
- Dvadeset nikada više (1982)

=== Compilation albums ===
- Milord za sva vremena (1989)
- Prijatelji, zdravo! (1995)
- Sećanja (1997)
- K'o nekad (2005)

=== EPs ===
- Milord (1961)
- Ekspres-kafa (1962)
- Đavoli (1963)
- Igrajmo twist (1963)
- Dečje igre (1963)
- Gonzales (1963)
- Ja plaćam ove noći (1963)
- Drugovi iz mog dvorišta (1963)
- Roberta (1963)
- Zvižduk u 8 (1964)
- Sam (1964)
- Marko Polo (1964)
- Medison u Meksiku (1964)
- Natali (1965)
- Drugovi moji (1966)
- Devojke (1967)
- Mene nema ko da žali (1968)
- Romana (1968)
- Ako ljubavi nema (1969)
- Padajte kiše na naš grad (1970)
- Didu-lidu-dadu (1971)

=== Singles ===
- "Pesma raznosača mleka"/"Prodavac novina" (1960)
- "Ljiljana"/"Ulicama sreće" (1963)
- "Od ljubavi do mržnje"/"Na gori raste jorgovan" (1970)
- "Za dane ljubavi"/"Ruže u tami" (1971)
- "I tako ode Marija"/"Na tvoju ruku ja nemam više prava" (1971)
- "Grešnica"/"Ne želim da umrem sad" (1972)
- "Ta tužna muzika"/"Digi-digi-dajge" (1972)
- "Živiš sama"/"Ona me ne voli više" (1974)
- "A život teče dalje"/"Ema, Emili" (1975)
- "Činge linge"/"Ako čovek živi sam" (1975)
- "Poslednji voz"/"Pesma s planine" (1975)
- "Bela dama – crni kralj"/"Nemoj nikad da me ostavljaš" (1977)
- "Nikad nije kasno"/"Ružičasti sneg" (1978)
- "Kabare"/"Moje ludo srce" (1979)
