= Rockovnik =

- Genre: Documentary
- Created by: Dušan Vesić; Sandra Rančić
- Written by: Dušan Vesić; Sandra Rančić
- Directed by: Dušan Vesić
- Presented by: Sandra Rančić
- Opening theme: "Rock and Roll" by Led Zeppelin
- Country of origin: Serbia
- No. of episodes: 40

Production
- Editor: Dragan Ilić

Original release
- Network: Radio Television of Serbia
- Release: 1 January 2011 – August 2011

Rockovnik (trans. Chrocknicle) is a forty-episode documentary aired on Radio Television of Serbia in 2011, written by Sandra Rančić and Dušan Vesić and directed by Vesić. The series focuses on the history of former Yugoslav rock scene from its beginnings in the late 1950s until the year 2000. The name of the show is a bilingual pun based on the words "rock" and "rokovnik" (Serbian for planner).

== Summary ==
The show features the Led Zeppelin song "Rock and Roll" as the opening theme.

The first ten episodes deal with the late 1950s and the 1960s in Yugoslav rock music, the next ten episodes with the 1970s, and the following ten with the 1980s. The last ten episodes deal with the period from the beginning of Yugoslav Wars and the breakup of Yugoslavia to the 2000 political changes in Serbia, and, as with the dissolution of the country the Yugoslav rock scene ceased to exist, mostly with the Serbian rock scene.

Every episode features a small list of events, both political and cultural, that happened during a certain year.

== Recording ==
The first recordings were made at the end of the 1990s, but most of the recording took place during 2004, in Belgrade, Zagreb, Ljubljana, Sarajevo, Rijeka, Pula, Kumrovec, Kragujevac and Novi Sad.

== Episodes ==
No.	Title	Original release date
1	"I strana: Neka bude rock (Uvod 1955 - 1958)"	TBA
"I strana: Neka bude rock (Uvod 1955 - 1958)" ("Page I: Let There Be Rock (Introduction 1955 - 1958)"; titled after AC/DC song "Let There Be Rock") opens with the definitions of rock music given by Yugoslav musicians. It deals with the beginnings of rock music in the United States of America and the phenomena of rock music, and how rock and roll reached Yugoslavia. It deals with one of the first rock and roll musicians in Yugoslavia, Mile Lojpur.
2	"II strana: Ljubav i moda (Beograd 1958 -1963)"	TBA
"II strana: Ljubav i moda (Beograd 1958 -1963)" ("Page II: Love and Fashion (Belgrade 1958 - 1963)"; titled after the Yugoslav musical film Ljubav i moda) deals with the popular culture in Belgrade at the end of the 1950s and the beginning of the 1960s: jazz music, Đorđe Marjanović as one of the first pop singers which performed rock and roll songs, Ljubav i moda, dances and the appearance of the first rock and roll show on Yugoslav radio. It also deals with the appearance of Cliff Richard and the Shadows and The Shadows' large influence on the first Yugoslav bands.
3	"III strana: Rock & Roll u Zagrebu (1958 -1964)"	TBA
"III strana: Rock & Roll u Zagrebu (1958 -1964)" ("Page III: Rock & Roll in Zagreb (1958 -1964)") deals with the appearance of one of the first rock musicians in Zagreb, rock and roll singer Karlo Metikoš, and with his international career under the name Matt Collins, and the appearance of first Zagreb-based beat bands, Bijele Strijele, Roboti and Crveni Koralji, and their first releases.
4	"IV strana: Bježi kišo s prozora (Sarajevo 1961 - 1968)"	TBA
"IV strana: Bježi kišo s prozora (Sarajevo 1961 - 1968)" ("Page IV: Rain, Get Away from the Window (Sarajevo 1961 - 1968"; titled after Crvena jabuka song "Bježi kišo s prozora") deals with the emergence of rock music in Sarajevo and the appearance of the band Indexi.
5	"V strana: Mramor, kamen i željezo (Beat u Zagrebu 1964 - 1967)"	TBA
"V strana: Mramor, kamen i željezo (Beat u Zagrebu 1964 - 1967)" ("Page V: Marble, Stone and Iron (Beat in Zagreb 1964 - 1967)"; titled after Roboti song "Mramor, kamen i željezo") deals with the Zagreb beat scene – the bands Bijele Strijele, Crveni Koralji, Roboti and Mladi.
6	"VI strana: Uhvati vetar (Beat u Beogradu 1964 - 1968)"	TBA
"VI strana: Uhvati vetar (Beat u Beogradu 1964 - 1968)" ("Page VI: Catch the Wind (Beat in Belgrade 1964 - 1968)"; titled after Zlatni Dečaci song "Uhvati vetar") deals with the Belgrade beat scene – the bands Iskre, Zlatni Dečaci, Siluete. Elipse and Crni Biseri and singer Ivanka Pavlović, and with the appearance of the first rock magazine in Yugoslavia, Džuboks.
7	"VII strana: Ruke pružam (Sarajevo 1964 - 1968)"	TBA
"VII strana: Ruke pružam (Sarajevo 1965 - 1969)" ("Page VII: I'm Giving My Hands (Sarajevo 1965 - 1969)"; titled after Indexi song "Ruke pružam") deals with the Sarajevo rock scene in the second half of the 1960s, mostly the band Indexi, focusing on the appearance of first songs completely authored by Yugoslav musicians.
8	"VIII strana: Osmeh (Autorski rock u Hrvatskoj 1966 - 1970)"	TBA
"VIII strana: Osmeh (Autorski rock u Hrvatskoj 1966 - 1970)" ("Page VIII: Smile (Author rock in Croatia 1966- 1970)"; titled after Grupa 220 song "Osmeh") deals with the first Croatian rock acts that authored their own songs, the bands Grupa 220 and Mi, and with the appearance of the magazine Pop Express.
9	"IX strana: Stepenice za nebo (Kultne grupe 1967 - 1970)"	TBA
"IX strana: Stepenice za nebo (Kultne grupe 1967 - 1970)" ("Page IX: Stairway to Heaven (Cult Bands 1967 - 1970)"; titled after Led Zeppelin song "Stairway to Heaven") deals with the bands Čičak, Dinamiti, Wheels of Fire and Mića Goran i Zoran, which featured future members of Bijelo Dugme, Korni Grupa and Time.
10	"X strana: Prvo svetlo u kući broj 4 (Beograd 1968 - 1970)"	TBA
"X strana: Prvo svetlo u kući broj 4 (Beograd 1968 - 1970)" ("Page X: The First Light in the House Number 4 (Belgrade 1968 - 1970)"; titled after Korni Grupa song "Prvo svetlo u kući broj 4") deals with the band Korni Grupa, the conncection of Yugoslav Black Wave film movement and rock music, and the Yugoslav production of the musical Hair.
11	"XI strana: U tami disko-kluba (Jugoslovenska rock scena 1971 - 1972)"	TBA
"XI strana: U tami disko-kluba (Jugoslovenska rock scena 1971 - 1972)" ("Page XI: In the Darkness of Disco Club" (Yugoslav rock scene 1971 - 1972)"; titled after YU Grupa song "U tami disko kluba") deals with the acts Drago Mlinarec, YU Grupa and Korni Grupa.
12	"XII strana: Put na istok (Jugoslovenska rock scena 1972)"	TBA
"XII strana: Put na istok (Jugoslovenska rock scena 1972)" ("Page XII: A Trip to the East (Yugoslav Rock Sene 1972)"; titled after Korni Grupa song "Put na istok") deals with the acts Korni Grupa, Indexi and Time.
13	"XIII strana: Čudna šuma (Jugoslovenska rock scena 1973 - 1975)"	TBA
"XIII strana: Čudna šuma (Jugoslovenska rock scena 1973 - 1975)" ("Page XIII: Strange Forest (Yugoslav Rock Scene 1973 - 1975)"; titled after YU Grupa song "Čudna šuma") deals with the acts YU Grupa, S Vremena Na Vreme, Josipa Lisac, Time, Indexi, Pro Arte and Srđan Marjanović.
14	"XIV strana: Kad bi bio bijelo dugme (Jugoslovenska rock scena 1974 - 1975)"	TBA
"XIV strana: Kad bi bio bijelo dugme (Jugoslovenska rock scena 1974 - 1975)" ("Page XIV: If I Were a White Button (Yugoslav rock scene 1974 - 1975)"; titled after Bijelo Dugme song "Kad bi bio bijelo dugme") deals with the bands Bijelo Dugme, Pop Mašina, Korni Grupa, Jugoslovenska Pop Selekcija and Time, and with the restart of Džuboks magazine.
15	"XV strana: Pljuni istini u oči (Jugoslovenska rock scena 1975)"	TBA
"XV strana: Pljuni istini u oči (Jugoslovenska rock scena 1975)" ("Page XV: Spit the Truth in the Eyes (Yugoslav Rock Scene 1975)"; titled after Buldožer song "Pljuni istini u oči") deals with the bands Buldožer, Indexi, Drugi Način and Bijelo Dugme, and with the on stage-death of San vocalist Predrag Jovičić.
16	"XVI strana: Šumadijski blues (Jugoslovenska rock scena 1975 - 1976)"	TBA
"XVI strana: Šumadijski blues (Jugoslovenska rock scena 1975 - 1976)" ("Page XVI: Šumadijan Blues (Yugoslav Rock Scene 1975 - 1976)"; titled after Smak song "Šumadijski blues") deals with the bands Smak and Bijelo Dugme.
17	"XVII strana: Dođite na show (Jugoslovenska rock scena 1976 - 1978)"	TBA
"XVII strana: Dođite na show (Jugoslovenska rock scena 1976 - 1978)" ("Page XVII: Come to the Show (Yugoslav Rock Scene 1976 - 1978)"; titled after Parni Valjak song "Dođite na show") deals with the acts Smak, Parni Valjak and Bijelo Dugme.
18	"XVIII strana: Pakleni vozači (Jugoslovenska rock scena 1978 - 1979)"	TBA
"XVIII strana: Pakleni vozači (Jugoslovenska rock scena 1978 - 1979)" ("Page XVIII: Hell Riders (Yugoslav Rock Scene 1978 - 1979)"; titled after Atomsko Sklonište song "Pakleni vozači") deals with the acts Atomsko Sklonište, Leb i Sol, Zdravko Čolić, Laza & Ipe, Vatreni Poljubac and Indexi.
19	"XIX strana: Rock 'n' Roll za kućni savet (Jugoslovenska rock scena 1978 - 1979)"	TBA
"XIX strana: Rock 'n' Roll za kućni savet (Jugoslovenska rock scena 1978 - 1979)" ("Page XIX: Rock 'n' Roll for Residents' Committee (Yugoslav Rock Scene 1978 - 1979)"; titled after Riblja Čorba song "Rock 'n' Roll za kućni savet") deals with the acts Riblja Čorba, Bijelo Dugme, Generacija 5 and Slađana Milošević.
20	"XX strana: Ružan, pametan i mlad (Jugoslovenska rock scena 1979 - 1980)"	TBA
"XX strana: Ružan, pametan i mlad (Jugoslovenska rock scena 1979 - 1980)" ("Page XX: Ugly, Smart and Young (Yugoslav Rock Scene 1978 - 1979)"; titled after Pekinška Patka song "Biti ružan, pametan i mlad") deals with the bands Laboratorija Zvuka, Parni Valjak and some of the first Yugoslav punk rock bands in Yugoslavia, Pekinška Patka and Prljavo Kazalište, as well as with the death of Yugoslav president Josip Broz Tito.
21	"XXI strana: Niko kao ja (Jugoslovenska rock scena 1980 - 1981)"	TBA
"XXI strana: Niko kao ja (Jugoslovenska rock scena 1980 - 1981)" ("Page XXI: Nobody like Me: Yugoslav Rock Scene 1980 - 1981"; titled after Šarlo Akrobata song "Niko kao ja") deals with the closely associated Yugoslav punk rock and Yugoslav new wave scenes, mainly the bands Pankrti, Paraf, Idoli, Film, Električni Orgazam and Šarlo Akrobata.
22	"XXII strana: Užas je moja furka (Jugoslovenska rock scena 1981 - 1982)"	TBA
"XXII strana: Užas je moja furka (Jugoslovenska rock scena 1981 - 1982)" ("Page XXII: Horror Is What Makes Me Tick (Yugoslav Rock Scene 1981 - 1982)"; titled after the Azra song "Užas je moja furka") deals with the bands Azra, Riblja Čorba, Lačni Franz and Divlje Jagode, and with the appearance of the rock magazine Rock 82.
23	"XXIII strana: Tanz Mit Laibach (Jugoslovenska rock scena 1983 - 1985)"	TBA
"XXIII strana: Tanz Mit Laibach (Jugoslovenska rock scena 1983 - 1985)" ("Page XIII: Dance with Laibach (Yugoslav Rock Scene 1983 - 1985)"; titled after Laibach song "Tanz Mit Laibach") deals with the acts Laibach, U Škripcu, Dorian Gray, Xenia and Bebi Dol.
24	"XXIV strana: Anarhija All Over Baščaršija (Jugoslovenska rock scena 1983 - 1985)"	TBA
"XXIV strana: Anarhija All Over Baščaršija (Jugoslovenska rock scena 1983 - 1985)" ("Page XXIV: Anarchy all over Baščaršija (Yugoslav Rock Scene 1983 - 1985)"; titled after Zabranjeno Pušenje song "Anarhija All Over Baščaršija") deals with the New Primitivism movement, primarily the bands Elvis J. Kurtovich & His Meteors and Zabranjeno Pušenje, and with the bands Bijelo Dugme and Riblja Čorba.
25	"XXV strana: Pogledaj dom svoj, anđele (Jugoslovenska rock scena 1985)"	TBA
"XXV strana: Pogledaj dom svoj, anđele (Jugoslovenska rock scena 1985)" (Page XXV: Look Homeward, Angel (Yugoslav Rock Scene 1985)"; titled after Riblja Čorba song "Pogledaj dom svoj, anđele") deals with the bands Bajaga i Instruktori, Denis & Denis, Bijelo Dugme and Riblja Čorba, and with Yugoslav contribution to Live Aid, YU Rock Misija.
26	"XXVI strana: Jedan poziv menja sve (Jugoslovenska rock scena 1985)"	TBA
"XXVI strana: Jedan poziv menja sve (Jugoslovenska rock scena 1985)" ("Page XXVI: A Call Changes All (Yugoslav Rock Scene 1985)"; titled after a verse from Partibrejkers song "1000 godina") deals with the acts Partibrejkers, Haustor and Plavi Orkestar.
27	"XXVII strana: Bivše devojčice, bivši dečaci (Jugoslovenska rock scena 1986 - 1987)"	TBA
"XXVII strana: Bivše devojčice, bivši dečaci (Jugoslovenska rock scena 1986 - 1987)" ("Page XXVII: Ex Boys, Ex Girls (Yugoslav Rock Scene 1986 - 1987)"; titled after Crvena Jabuka song "Bivše djevojčice, bivši dječaci") deals with the acts Crvena Jabuka, Divlje Jagode, Bijelo Dugme, Plavi Orkestar, Riblja Čorba and Bajaga i Instruktori.
28	"XXVIII strana: Kao da je bilo nekad (Jugoslovenska rock scena 1987 - 1988)"	TBA
"XXVIII strana: Kao da je bilo nekad (Jugoslovenska rock scena 1987 - 1988)" ("Page XVIII: "As If It Had Once Been" (Yugoslav Rock Scene 1986 - 1987)"; titled after Ekatarina Velika song "Kao da je bilo nekad") deals with the acts Ekatarina Velika, Električni Orgazam, Boris Novković and Laibach, and with the death of Atomsko Sklonište vocalist Sergio Blažić.
29	"XXIX strana: Igra Rock 'n' Roll cela Jugoslavija (Jugoslovenska rock scena 1988 - 1989)"	TBA
"XXIX strana: Igra Rock 'n' Roll cela Jugoslavija (Jugoslovenska rock scena 1988 - 1989)" ("Page XXIX: The Whole Yugoslavia Is Dancing to Rock 'n' Roll (Yugoslav Rock Scene 1988 - 1989)"; titled after Električni Orgazam song "Igra Rock 'n' Roll cela Jugoslavija") deals with the bands Psihomodo Pop, Bajaga i Instruktori, Bijelo Dugme, Električni Orgazam, as well as with the tours of Yugoslav bands in the Soviet Union.
30	"XXX strana: Kako je propao Rock 'n' Roll (Jugoslovenska rock scena 1988 - 1989)"	TBA
"XXX strana: Kako je propao Rock 'n' Roll (Jugoslovenska rock scena 1988 - 1989)" ("Page XXX: The Fall of Rock and Roll (Yugoslav Rock Scene 1988 - 1989)"; titled after the omnibus film The Fall of Rock and Roll) deals with the acts from the northwest of Croatia – Fit, Cacadou Look, Let 3 and KUD Idijoti, the bands Partibrejkers and Ekatarina Velika, and the film The Fall of Rock 'n' Roll.
31	"XXXI strana: Rat i mir (Jugoslovenska rock scena 1990 - 1991)"	TBA
"XXXI strana: Rat i mir (Jugoslovenska rock scena 1990 - 1991)" ("Page XXXI: War and Peace (Yugoslav Rock Scene 1990 - 1991)"; titled after Viktorija song "Rat i mir (Ljubav je...)") deals with the acts Viktorija, Rambo Amadeus, Vještice and Zabranjeno Pušenje, as well as with a 9 March 1991 protest in Belgrade and the outbreak of Yugoslav Wars.
32	"XXXII strana: Mir, brate, mir (1992)"	TBA
"XXXII strana: Mir, brate, mir (1992)" ("Page XXXII: Peace, Brother, Peace (1992)"; titled after a verse from Rimtutituki song "Slušaj 'vamo") deals with the supergroup Rimtutituki, the Fast Bands of Serbia movement, primarily Direktori and Kazna Za Uši, the death of former Šarlo Akrobata and Katarina II drummer Ivica Vdović "Vd", as well as the beginning of Bosnian War.
33	"XXXIII strana: Možeš me zvati kako god hoćeš (1993)"	TBA
"XXXIII strana: Možeš me zvati kako god hoćeš (1993)" ("Page XXXIII: You Can Yall Me Wahatever You Want (1993)"; titled after a verse from Bjesovi song "Ime") deals with the acts Babe, Bjesovi, Deca Loših Muzičara, Kristali and Ekatarina Velika, the founding of Music Television of Serbia, as well as with the rising popularity of turbo folk.
34	"XXXIV strana: Moji su drugovi biseri rasuti po celom svetu (1994)"	TBA
"XXXIV strana: Moji su drugovi biseri rasuti po celom svetu (1994)" ("Page XXXIV: My Friends Are Pearls Scattered all over the World"; titled after verses from Momčilo Bajagić's song "Moji drugovi") deals with the deaths of former Bijelo Dugme drummer Goran "Ipe" Ivandić and Ekatarina Velika frontman Milan Mladenović, and the acts Familija, Električni Orgazam, Generacija 5, Partibrejkers and Momčilo Bajagić "Bajaga".
35	"XXXV strana: Godina kulture (1995)"	TBA
"XXXV strana: Godina kulture (1995)" ("Page XXXV: The Year of Culture (1995)") deals with the bands Darkwood Dub, Plejboj, K2, Goblini, Deca Loših Muzičara and Atheist Rap, and the starting of the music show Paket aranžman.
36	"XXXVI strana: Samo droga Srbina Spasava (1996)"	TBA
"XXXVI strana: Samo droga Srbina Spasava (1996)" ("Page XXXVI: Only Drugs Save the Serbs (1996)"; titled after Block Out song "SDSS") deals with the acts Sunshine, Block Out, Disciplin A Kitschme, Rambo Amadeus, the release of the film Geto, as well as with the 1996–1997 protests in Serbia.
37	"XXXVII strana: Ja nisam odavle (1997)"	TBA
"XXXVII strana: Ja nisam odavle (1997)" ("Page XXXVII: I'm not from Around Here (1997)"; titled after Zabranjeno Pušenje song "Ja nisam odavle") deals with the bands Familija, Partibrejkers, the Belgrade factions of Zabranjeno Pušenje and Elvis J. Kurtovich & His Meteors, and the deaths of former Električni Orgazam and Babe drummer Goran Čavajda "Čavke" and former Riblja Čorba guitarist Rajko Kojić.
38	"XXXVIII strana: Nova žena, savremena, samostalna dama (1998)"	TBA
"XXXVIII strana: Nova žena, savremena, samostalna dama (1998)" ("Page XXXVIII: New Woman, Modern, Independent Lady (1998)"; titled after verses from Ksenija Pajčin song "Savremena žena") deals with the acts Boye, Ana Stanić, Marina Perazić and Ništa Ali Logopedi, the Serbian hip hop scene, mostly Voodoo Popeye, and with the Brooklyn Video Awards.
39	"XXXIX strana: Proći će i nihovo (1999)"	TBA
"XXXIX strana: Proći će i nihovo (1999)" ("Page XXIX: Their Time Will End (1999)") deals with the bands Partibrejkers, Eyesburn, Van Gogh, Darkwood Dub, Kanda, Kodža i Nebojša, as well as with the 1999 NATO bombing of Yugoslavia.
40	"Poslednja strana: Gotov(o) je! (Rock scena u Srbiji 2000. i šta je bilo posle)"	TBA
"Poslednja strana: Gotov(o) je! (Rock scena u Srbiji 2000. i šta je bilo posle)" ("Last Page: It's Over (Rock Scene in Serbia in 2000 and What Happened after That)") deals with the 5 October 2000 Revolution in Serbia and the events that followed it, the death of former Ekatarina Velika keyboardist Margita Stefanović "Magi" and the Serbian rock scene in the 2000s. The last part of the episode is a tribute to Yugoslav rock scene, featuring footage of Yugoslav rock acts (including the ones which were not a subject of the show's episodes, like Galija, Oliver Mandić, Metak, Piloti, Animatori, Kerber, Đavoli, Dino Dvornik, Oktobar 1864, and others) accompanied by an instrumental version of the song "Za milion godina".

== Interviews ==
The show features interviews with more than 300 personalities, mostly musicians, but also critics, journalists, fans, and others.

=== Musicians ===
- Miroslav "Miša" Aleksić (Riblja Čorba)
- Nebojša Antonijević "Anton" (Partibrejkers)
- Boris Aranđelović (Smak)
- Boris Babarović "Barba" (Crveni Koralji)
- Biljana Babić (Boye)
- Branislav Babić "Kebra" (Obojeni Program)
- Momčilo Bajagić "Bajaga" (Riblja Čorba, Bajaga i Instruktori)
- Željko Bebek (Bijelo Dugme, solo artist)
- Neno Belan (Đavoli, solo artist)
- Josip Boček (Dinamiti, Korni Grupa)
- Davorin Bogović (Prljavo Kazalište, solo artist)
- Branislav "Bane" Bojović (Sunshine)
- Janez Bončina "Benč" (Mladi Levi, Srce, Jugoslovenska Pop Selekcija, September)
- Vidoja "Džindžer" Božinović (Riblja Čorba)
- Vedran Božić (Roboti, Mi, Time)
- Lav Bratuša (Darkwood Dub)
- Marko Brecelj (Buldožer, solo artist)
- Goran Bregović (Bijelo Dugme)
- Aleksandar Cvetković (Siluete)
- Dejan Cukić (Bulevar, Bajaga i Instruktori, solo artist)
- Miroslav Cvetković "Cvele" (Bajaga i Instruktori)
- Samir Ćeremida "Ćera I" (Plavi Orkestar)
- Zdravko Čolić (Ambasadori, Korni Grupa, solo artist)
- Branko Črnac Tusta (KUD Idijoti)
- Nikola Čuturilo "Čutura" (Riblja Čorba, solo artist)
- Žarko Dančuo (Roboti, solo artist)
- Zoran Dašić (Legende)
- Milan Delčić "Delča" (U Škripcu, solo artist)
- Vladimir Divljan (Idoli, solo artist)
- Nebojša Drakula (Direktori)
- Bora Đorđević (Suncokret, Rani Mraz, Riblja Čorba)
- Ivan Đorđević "Ivek" (Kazna Za Uši)
- Vojislav Đukić (S Vremena Na Vreme)
- Zvonimir Đukić "Đule" (Van Gogh)
- Dragoljub Đuričić (YU Grupa, Leb i Sol, Kerber, Zdravko Čolić backing band)
- Mahmut Ferović (Čičak)
- Robert Funčić (Xenia)
- Vladimir Furduj (Korni Grupa)
- Milan "Miki" Gelb (Bijele Strijele)
- Davor Gobac (Psihomodo Pop)
- Vladimir "Vlajko" Golubović (Suncokret, Riblja Čorba, Bajaga i Instruktori)
- Srđan Gojković "Gile" (Električni Orgazam)
- Roman Goršek (Plejboj)
- Dejan Gvozden (Kristali)
- Husein Hasanefendić "Hus" (Grupa 220, Parni Valjak)
- Bojan Hreljac (Korni Grupa)
- Dragoljub "Dragan" Ilić (Generacija 5)
- Marko Ilić (CYA)
- Sanja Ilić (San, solo artist)
- Alen Islamović (Divlje Jagode, Bijelo Dugme, solo artist)
- Žan Jakopač (Pozdrav Azri)
- Dražen Janković "Drale" (Zabranjeno Pušenje, The No Smoking Orchestra)
- Vladimir Janković "Džet" (Crni Biseri, Tunel)
- Dragi Jelić (Siluete, Džentlmeni, YU Grupa)
- Živorad "Žika" Jelić (Džentlmeni, YU Grupa)
- Vladimir Jerić "Jera" (Darkwood Dub)
- Dragan "Krle" Jovanović (Generacija 5)
- Miodrag Jovanović "Miško" (Ništa Ali Logopedi)
- Milutin Jovančić "Mita" (Block Out)
- Jovan Jović (Deca Loših Muzičara)
- Tanja Jovićević (Oktobar 1864)
- Nele Karajlić (Zabranjeno Pušenje, The No Smoking Orchestra)
- Valter Kocijančić (Paraf)
- Nemanja Kojić "Kojot" (Eyesburn, Sunshine)
- Vlada Kokotović (Goblini)
- Zoran Kostić "Cane" (Partibrejkers)
- Kornelije Kovač (Indexi, Korni Grupa)
- Kristina Kovač (K2)
- Sreten "Sreta" Kovačević (Pekinška Patka, Kontraritam)
- Bruno Langer (Atomsko Sklonište)
- Boris Leiner (Azra, Vještice)
- Sead "Zele" Lipovača (Divlje Jagode)
- Mile Lojpur
- Aleksandar "Saša" Lokner (Galija, Bajaga i Instruktori)
- Saša Lošić "Loša" (Plavi Orkestar)
- Peter "Pero" Lovšin (Pankrti, Sokoli, solo artist)
- Davor Lukas (Fit)
- Aleksandar Lukić "Luka" (U Škripcu, Familija)
- Goran Marić (Bjesovi)
- Srđan Marić "Mara" (Direktori)
- Zoran Marinković (Bjesovi)
- Nenad Marjanović "dr Fric" (KUD Idijoti)
- Srđan Marjanović
- Dragoljub Marković "Bleki" (Ništa Ali Logopedi)
- Željko Markuš (Kristali)
- Damir Martinović "Mrle" (Termiti, Let 3)
- Radomir Mihajlović "Točak" (Smak, solo artist)
- Zoran Milanović (Smak)
- Miroslav "Vicko" Milatović (Riblja Čorba)
- Žika Milenković (Bajaga i Instruktori, Babe)
- Dejan Milojević (Dža ili Bu)
- Marko Milivojević (Ekatarina Velika)
- Aleksandra "Slađana" Milošević
- Aleksandar Milovanović "Sale Veruda" (KUD Idijoti)
- Jovan Mišević (Siluete)
- Drago Mlinarec (Grupa 220, solo artist)
- Kemal Monteno
- Oliver Nektarijević (Kanda, Kodža i Nebojša)
- Robert Nemeček (Dogovor iz 1804., Pop Mašina)
- Walter Neugebauer (Mladi)
- Ljubomir "Ljuba" Ninković (S Vremena Na Vreme)
- Ivan "Jani" Novak (Laibach)
- Boris Novković
- Đorđe Novković (Indexi, Pro Arte)
- Jurica Pađen (Grupa 220, Aerodrom, Azra, 4 Asa)
- Dejan Pejović "Peja" (Familija)
- Nenad Pejović (Kanda, Kodža i Nebojša)
- Marina Perazić (Denis & Denis, solo artist)
- Igor Perović (Plejboj)
- Goran Petranović "Rizo" (Elvis J. Kurtovich & His Meteors)
- Aleksandar Petrović "Alek" (Eyesburn)
- Branislav Petrović "Banana" (Električni Orgazam)
- Branko Požgajec (Drugi Način)
- Zoran Predin (Lačni Franz, solo artist)
- Zoran Prodanović "Prlja" (Let 3)
- Vlada Rajović (Kanda, Kodža i Nebojša)
- Ivan Ranković "Raka" (Tvrdo Srce i Velike Uši, Ekatarina Velika)
- Goran Redžepi "Gedža" (Familija)
- Zoran Redžić (Bijelo Dugme)
- Miodrag Ristić "Miki" (Darkwood Dub)
- Laza Ristovski (Smak, Bijelo Dugme, solo artist)
- Vladimir Rubčić (Bijele Strijele)
- Darko Rundek (Haustor, solo artist)
- Vladimir Savčić "Čobi" (Pro Arte)
- Massimo Savić (Dorian Gray, solo artist)
- Aleksandar Siljanovski "Silja" (Deca Loših Muzičara)
- Nebojša Simeunović "Sabljar" (Dža ili Bu)
- Jasmina "Nina" Simić (Cacadou Look)
- Tatjana "Tanja" Simić (Cacadou Look)
- Vojislav Simić
- Sejo Sexon (Zabranjeno Pušenje)
- Ana Stanić
- Mirko Srdić (Elvis J. Kurtovich & His Meteors)
- Ivan "Piko" Stančić (Grupa 220, Parni Valjak, Film, Le Cinema)
- Slobodan "Boba" Stefanović (Zlatni Dečaci, solo artist)
- Vladimir "Vlatko" Stefanovski (Leb i Sol, solo artist)
- Slobodan Stojanović "Kepa" (Smak)
- Jurisav "Jura" Stublić (Film)
- Siniša Škarica (Mi)
- Davor Tolja (Denis & Denis)
- Dado Topić (Dinamiti, Korni Grupa, Time, solo artist)
- Predrag "Peđa" Tošović (Direktori)
- Aleksandar Vasiljević "Vasa" (U Škripcu, Košava, Familija)
- Goran Vejvoda
- Viktorija
- Mladen Vojičić "Tifa" (Bijelo Dugme, Divlje Jagode, Vatreni Poljubac, solo artist)
- Voodoo Popeye
- Mladen "Bata" Vranešević (Laboratorija Zvuka)
- Predrag "Peđa" Vranešević (Laboratorija Zvuka)
- Nikola Vranjković (Block Out)
- Zoran Vulović "Vule" (U Škripcu)
- Milić Vukašinović (Indexi, Bijelo Dugme, Vatreni Poljubac, solo artist)
- Saša Zalepugin Jr. (La Fortunjeros)
- Zigi (Dža ili Bu)
- Dražen Žerić "Žera" (Crvena Jabuka)
- Zoran Živković "Žika" (Deca Loših Muzičara)

=== Others ===
- Branislav Antović - Music Television of Serbia manager
- Želimir Altarac Čičak - art manager, journalist
- Voja Aralica - producer
- Dejan Bodiroga - basketball player
- Branislav Cvetković - journalist
- Jovan Ćirilov - theatre expert, writer
- Srđan Dragojević - director
- Dragan Džigurski - rock fan
- Goga Grubješić - Superstar Agency producer
- Aleksandar Ilić "Sale" - EKV Records owner
- Jadranka Janković-Nešić - journalist
- Zlatko Jošić - manager and concert organiser
- Momo Kapor - writer
- Nikola Karaklajić - chess master, radio personality
- Slavoljub Knežević - Rajko Kojić's friend
- Zoran Lazarević "Kiza Betmen" - author of the show Paket aranžman
- Bane Lokner - rock critic
- Biljana Maksić - dramaturge
- Radomir "Raka" Marić - manager
- Višnja Marjanović - journalist
- Ivan Markov - director
- Dubravka "Duca" Marković - Hit meseca host
- Vladimir Mihaljek "Miha" - manager
- Milorad Milinković "Debeli" - director
- Zoran Modli - DJ
- Malkolm Muharem - manager, New Primitivism ideologue
- Nikola Nešković - journalist
- Biljana Nevajda - woman that inspired Riblja Čorba song "Ostani đubre do kraja"
- Dragan Nikolić - actor
- Predrag Novković - journalist
- Dragan Papić - artist
- Raša Petrović - journalist
- Mladen Popović - Hit meseca editor
- Nada Popović - rock fan
- Petar Popović - rock critic
- Momčilo Rajin - art historian, designer
- Ivana Ristič - rock fan
- Jovan Ristić - director
- Sonja Savić - actress
- Vladimir Spičanović - chronicler
- Marko Stoimenov - Margita Stefanović's boyfriend
- Rodoljub Stojanović "Rođa" - manager
- Tanja Vdović - Ivica Vdović "Vd"'s cousin
- Aleksandar Žikić - rock critic

== Rockovik on YouTube ==
The show's official YouTube channel features all the episodes of the show. The YouTube edition features the instrumental version of Atomsko Sklonište song "Olujni mornar" ("Storm Sailor") as the opening theme.

== Possible DVD release ==
In a 2013 interview, Sandra Rančić stated that there was a possibility for the show to be released on DVD, and that the DVD release would feature some of the unused footage.
