= Live at KST, Belgrade 31.05.2003 =

Live at KST, Belgrade 31.05.2003.

Video by Bjesovi
- Released: 2003
- Recorded: May 31, 2003; KST, Belgrade
- Genre: Alternative rock
- Label: self release

Bjesovi chronology
Na živo (2002)	Live at KST, Belgrade 31.05.2003. (2003)	Bolje ti (2009)

Live at KST, Belgrade 31.05.2003. is a video album by the Serbian rock band Bjesovi, released in 2003.

== Track listing ==
1. "U osvit zadnjeg dana" (3:47)
2. "Vraćam se dole" (2:38)
3. "Džordžija" (4:10)
4. "Ona te voli" (7:10)
5. "Vreme je" (5:42)
6. "Avioni pevaju" (8:54)
7. "Sve što vidim" (6:07)
8. "Gavran" (7:41)
9. "Sve će se doznati" (3:11)
10. "Ne budi me" (5:37)
11. "Ime" (5:10)
12. "Raduj se" (3:11)

== Personnel ==
- Marko Marković (bass)
- Miroslav Marjanović (drums, backing vocals)
- Slobodan Vuković (guitar)
- Zoran Filipović (guitar)
- Dragan Arsić (guitar)
- Zoran Marinković (vocals)
- Goran Marić (vocals on track 6)
