= Belgrade Beer Fest =

Festival

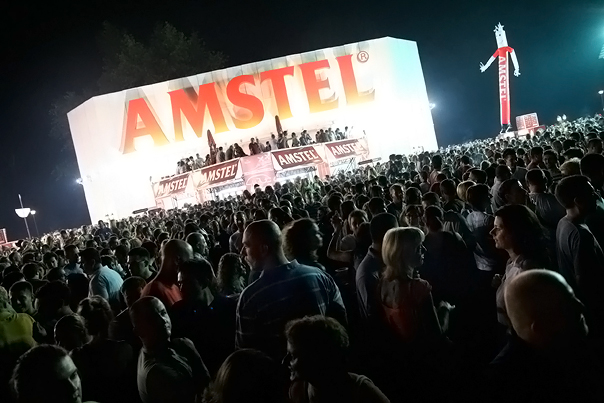
- Belgrade Beer Fest in 2009
- Genre: Rock, pop, world music, electronic music
- Dates: 5 days, each August; 15–19 August
- Locations: Ušće, Belgrade, Serbia
- Years active: 2003–2019, 2021–
- Website: www.belgradebeerfest.com

The Belgrade Beer Fest (Serbian: Београдски фестивал пива / Beogradski festival piva) is an annual festival of beer in Belgrade, Serbia. Started in 2003, the festival is held annually over five days each August as a showcase event for various beer producers. In addition to domestic and foreign brews, the festival features live music performances each evening.

It has quickly grown in size and popularity: in 2004, it attracted over 75,000 foreign visitors to Belgrade, and in 2005, it was the second most visited festival in Serbia with 300,000 visitors. In 2009, it attracted more than 650,000 visitors, and in 2010, the festival attracted about 900,000 visitors.

No festival was held in 2020.

The festival entrance was free until 2023.

== History ==
#	Year	Location	Dates	Headliners	Guests	Notes
1	2003	Kalemegdan Fortress	21–24 August	Psihomodo Pop, Neno Belan & Fiumens, Hladno Pivo, Sunshine, Orthodox Celts, Eyesburn, Tir na n'Og, So Sabi, Intruder, Rare, VROOM		The musical program was divided into two parts: the rock, pop and world music acts performed from 18:00 until 00:30 and DJs from 00:30 until 05:00. Orthodox Celts, the only act which appeared on every Belgrade Beer Fest so far (except Belgrade Beer Fest 2004, when their performance, alongside the whole program for August 21 and 22 was canceled), performed on the festival for the first time.
2	2004	Kalemegdan Fortress	19–22 August	Lude Krawe, Grandpa Candys, Hladno Pivo, Cactus Jack, Negative, Hladno Pivo, Irish Stew of Sindidun, Kraljevski Apartman, E-Play, Van Gogh, Night Shift, Saša Lokner		The musical program scheduled for August 21 and 22 was canceled due to the storm that damaged the stage.
3	2005	Kalemegdan Fortress	17–21 August	Čikine Bombone, Irish Stew of Sindidun, Sirova Koža, Prljavi Inspektor Blaža i Kljunovi, Van Gogh, Louis, Tir na n'Og, Đorđe David & Gang, Tanja Jovićević, Darko Rundek, Delča & Sklekovi, Zona B, Kraljevski Apartman, Najda & Gale, Sunshine, Shiroko, Point Blank, Orthodox Celts, Del Arno Band		The festival lasted for five days for the first time.
4	2006	Kalemegdan Fortress	16–20 August	Šinobusi, The Belgrade Dixieland Orchestra, Zvonko Bogdan, Plava Trava Zaborava, Šukar, So Sabi, 357, Alogia, Eyesburn, Atomsko Sklonište, Orthodox Celts, Tir na n'Og, Omar Naber, Damir Urban, Van Gogh, Električni Orgazam, Louis, Irish Stew of Sindidun, Đorđe David & Gang, Superhiks, Rambo Amadeus, Zabranjeno Pušenje, Kevin Saunderson	550,000	
5	2007	Kalemegdan Fortress	15–19 August	Trigger, Đura i Mornari, Nikola Čuturilo, Prljavi Inspektor Blaža i Kljunovi, EKV Revisited, Louis, Neno Belan & Fiumens, Osmi Putnik, Dan D, Vlatko Stefanovski, YU grupa, Vatreni Poljubac, Deca Loših Muzičara, Rare, Kristali, Najda & Gale, Psihomodo Pop, Foltin, E-Play, Kraljevski Apartman, Čovek Bez Sluha, Elvis Jackson, Del Arno Band, Orthodox Celts, So Sabi, Zona B, Elvis J. Kurtović, Emir & Frozen Camels featuring Danny Shepard, Van Gogh		The festival featured two stages. The Main Stage featured rock, pop and world music acts, while the second, sponsored by Beck's and entitled Beck'sperience Stage, featured electronic music acts.
6	2008	Ušće Park	20–24 August	Šank Rock, KUD Idijoti, Dragoljub Đuričić & Drummers, Prljavi Inspektor Blaža i Kljunovi, Louis, Big Foot Mama, Kanda, Kodža i Nebojša, Generacija 5, Film, Dubioza Kolektiv, Atomsko Sklonište, Carne Cruda, Block Out, Galija, Kiril Džajkovski, Cedric Gervais, Timo Maas, Goribor, Atheist Rap, Dado Topić & Time, Orthodox Celts, Darkwood Dub, Sunshine, Oružjem Protivu Otmičara, Nervozni Poštar, Vrelo, Arhangel, Van Gogh		The festival was held in Ušće Park for the first time.
7	2009	Ušće Park	12–16 August	Zvonko Bogdan, Wickeda, Laibach, Stereo MC's and Strip, Odjila, Divlje Jagode, Darko Rundek & Cargo Orkestar, Rambo Amadeus, LMT Connection, Letu Štuke, Esma Redžepova, Vatra, Aleksandra Pileva, Psihomodo Pop, Orthodox Celts, The Shapeshifters, Toni Kitanovski & Čerkezi Orkestar, Let 3, Emir & Frozen Camels, Valentino, Vlatko Stefanovski, Kiki Lesendrić & Piloti	650,000	
8	2010	Ušće Park	18–22 August	Instant Karma, Zdenka Kovačiček, Ana Popović, Partibrejkers, Kiril Džajkovski, Gramophonedzie, Benny Benassi, Zona B, Legende, Jurica Pađen & Aerodrom, Riblja Čorba, Prljavi Inspektor Blaža i Kljunovi, S.A.R.S., Kal, Pankrti, Bajaga i Instruktori, Del Arno Band, Skroz, Siddharta, Sunshine, YU grupa, Orthodox Celts, Louis, Bilja Krstić & Bistrik Orchestra, Dejan Cukić, Neno Belan & Fiumens, Van Gogh	900,000	
9	2011	Ušće Park	17–21 August	Šinobusi, Vasil Hadžimanov Band, maNga, Negative, Riblja Čorba, Marky Ramones Blitzkrieg, Zvonko Bogdan, Sevdah Baby, Magnifico, Simple Minds, Goblini, Orthodox Celts, Atlantida, Garavi Sokak, Svremenaši, S.A.R.S., Dubioza Kolektiv, Kerber, Atomsko Sklonište, Pips, Chips & Videoclips, Zemlja Gruva, Jura Stublić & Film, Uli Jon Roth, Boris Leiner & Pozdrav Azri, Emir & Frozen Camels, Svi Na Pod!, Lollobrigida, Sanja Ilić & Balkanika, Kiki Lesendrić i Piloti	650,000	The festival featured the second stage, sponsored by Tuborg and entitled Tuborg Meeting Point.
10	2012	Ušće Park	14–19 August	Toni Montano, Viva Vox Choir, Kiki Lesendrić & Piloti, Električni Orgazam, Plejboj, Vampiri, Obojeni Program, Hladno Pivo, Vlatko Stefanovski, Rambo Amadeus, Ritam Nereda, Zoran Predin & Cover Lover, Galija, Dado Topić & Time After Time, Psihomodo Pop, Pekinška Patka, Bilja Krstić & Bistrik Orchestra, Plavi Orkestar, YU grupa, Zabranjeno Pušenje, Prljavi Inspektor Blaža i Kljunovi, Love Hunters, Crvena Jabuka, Siddharta, Sunshine, Orthodox Celts, Kiril Džajkovski, Pete Tong, Zona B, Đura & Mornari, Valentino, Partibrejkers, Van Gogh	700,000	The festival lasted six days for the first time.
11	2013	Ušće Park	14–18 August	Zvonko Bogdan, Massimo Savić, Atomsko Sklonište, Rambo Amadeus, Bad Copy & V.I.P., Sunshine, Sirova Koža, Osmi Putnik, Riblja Čorba, Alen Islamović & Kad Bi Bio Bijelo Dugme, Generacija 5, Bjesovi, Kerber, The Dibidus, Dubioza Kolektiv, Babe, The Shapeshifters, E-Play, Bajaga i Instruktori, Deca Loših Muzičara, Orthodox Celts, Boban Marković Trumpet Orchestra, Legende, Boney M., Dejan Cukić & Spori Ritam Bend, Partibrejkers, Block Out	700,000	
12	2014	Ušće Park	13–17 August	Love Hunters, Parni Valjak, Cee Lo Green, Felix da Housecat, Garavi Sokak, Bajaga i Instruktori, Sharks, Snakes & Planes, Bad Copy, Sanja Ilić & Balkanika, Plavi Orkestar, Atheist Rap, Goblini, Darren Emerson, Kanda, Kodža i Nebojša, Hladno Pivo, Prljavi Inspektor Blaža i Kljunovi, Edo Maajka, Orthodox Celts, Di Luna Blues Band, Bilja & Bistrik, Van Gogh, YU grupa, Darkwood Dub, S.A.R.S.		The entrance on the first day of the festival was charged.
13	2015	Ušće Park	18–23 August			

== Accolades ==
On December 31, 2005 the British newspaper The Independent named Belgrade Beer Fest "one of the worldwide events to visit in 2006".

== Incidents ==
On 19 August 2007, the last day of the 2007 Belgrade Beer Fest at Kalemegdan Fortress, the body of 22-year-old Branko Jovanović from Belgrade was found lifeless and partially consumed in a Belgrade Zoo bear cage (also located at the Fortress). It is believed that the man, possibly under the influence of alcohol or narcotics, may have fallen from a restaurant overlooking the bear cage, an open-air structure with no roof. Two adult bears had dragged the man's body to the feeding corner of the cage. The investigation department of the court claimed that there were no indications that the young man was murdered. Subsequently, the following year's 2008 edition of the festival was relocated from the Fortress.

On 20 August 2011, an attacker randomly stabbed eight visitors of the festival with a knife. Later identified as Ljubomir Trifunović from Belgrade, the attacker was sentenced to seven years in prison.

== Official sponsors ==
- AIK banka Serbia
- IDEA supermarket
- Meridian Tech
- Corona beer

== See also ==
- Beer in Serbia
- Exit Festival
