= Prljavi Inspektor Blaža i Kljunovi =

- Origin: Belgrade, Serbia
- Genres: Rock, garage rock, comedy rock
- Years active: 1994 – present
- Labels: ITMM, Multimedia Records
- Members: Igor Blažević; Aleksandar Karadžić; Vojin Djurašinović; Saša Babić; Dejan Resanović
- Past members: Milutin Petrović; Ljubinko Tomanović
- Website: www.blazaikljunovi.com

Prljavi Inspektor Blaža i Kljunovi (Serbian Cyrillic: Прљави Инспектор Блажа и Кљунови, trans. Dirty Inspector Blaža and Honchos) is a Serbian rock band from Belgrade.

== History ==
=== 1990s ===
The band was formed at the beginning of 1994 by Igor Blažević (also known as Prljavi Inspektor Blaža, Dirty Inspector Blaža, vocals), "Gazda" Milutin Petrović (guitar), Aleksandar Karadžič (guitar), Dejan Resanović (bass guitar) and Vojin Šurašinović (drums). At the beginning of the 1980s, Blažević was the leader of the new wave band Fiskulturno Lane. He started using his pseudonym at the end of 1991 when he became a radio host at Radio Pingvin.

In the beginning, the band performed mostly at the Belgrade club Prostor and Klub Studenata Tehnike. Most of the songs they performed were hits by former Yugoslav rock bands, but their main hit was Blažević's song "Dule Savić" (referring to former football player Dušan Savić). Blažević often performed striptease on stage and communicated with the members of the audience, and the band soon became one of Belgrade's most popular club bands, so they self-released the recording of their concert in Klub Studenata Tehnike held on April 14, 1994, on the audio cassette Igra rokenrol SR Jugoslavija (FR Yugoslavia Is Dancing to Rock and Roll, referring to Električni Orgazam hit "Igra rock 'n' roll cela Jugoslavija"). The album featured covers of songs by Azra, Zabranjeno Pušenje, Riblja Čorba, Prljavo Kazalište, Bijelo Dugme, Plavi Orkestar, but also by Blažević's former band Fiskulturno Lane. Panta, leader of the alternative rock band Šiklja Nafta, and Drakula, leader of the punk rock band Direktori appeared on the concert as guests. During the same year, on May 25, Blažević organized a Youth Day celebration at the club Prostor which featured all the elements of rock culture from the socialist times.

In October 1996, the band released their first studio album entitled Plagijati i obrade (Plagiarism and Covers) which featured covers of Jadranka Stojaković's "Čekala sam", Elvis J Kurtović's "Da bog da crk'o rokenrol (kad ga svako svira)", Mile Lojpur's "Šumadijski tvist", the former featuring Lojpur on vocals. The album also featured new versions of Fiskulturno Lane songs "Vive Le France" and "Nema problema", the latter featuring Miško Petrović "Plavi" on keyboards. Plagijati i obrade also featured singer Marija Mihajlović and the members of Irish folk/Celtic rock band Orthodox Celts as guest musicians. After the album was released, Milutin Petrović left the band and was replaced by Sale Šofer. In 1998, before the beginning of the 1998 FIFA World Cup, Prljavi Inspektor Blaža i Kljunovi recorded the song "Alez Yugoslavia", a cover of the Édith Piaf's song "Milord", which was, alongside other football chants, released on the compilation album Navijačke pesme '98.

In 1998 the band released their second studio album Seks, droga i Bodiroga (Sex, Drugs, Bodiroga, referring to basketball player Dejan Bodiroga). Blažević decided to name the album Seks, droga i Bodiroga, having seen this written as a graffiti, after FR Yugoslavia won the gold medal at the 1998 FIBA World Championship. The album featured hits "Dule Savić 3", "Arigo Saki bluz" (which featured several lines from Riblja Čorba's "Evo ti za taksi" lyrics), "Lepa si Pamela" (dedicated to Pamela Anderson), "O kako gi sakam parite" (sung in Macedonian) and the title track. This album featured only two covers, a cover of Adriano Celentano's "24.000 baci" and an unplugged cover of Azra song "Balkan" (Prljavi Inspektor Blaža i Kljunovi version titled "Balkan anplagd"), the former being the recording of Blažević's performance at the 1994 unplugged festival in Belgrade's Sava Centar. Blažević and other members of the band soon formed the record label Kljun records, intending to release albums by bands from other former Yugoslav republics.

=== 2000s ===
In 2000, the band released the live album Shipu ga Žobla! (anagram for Puši ga Blažo!, trans. Suck It, Blaža!) which was recorded at the band performance in Studentski kulturni centar. In 2002, the band released Pare ne vraćamo (We Won't Give Money Back) which featured songs in the similar comedy rock style as on the previous band releases, with songs referring to James Bond, Anna Kournikova and Pamela Anderson. The album featured guest appearances by YU grupa member Dragi Jelić, on vocals in "To je samo rock 'n' roll", and Eyesburn members Aleksandar Petrović "Alek", flute on "Zvuci rodnog kraja" and tambourine on "Sunce tuđeg neba (ne greje k'o naše)", and Hornsman Coyote, trombone on "Anna Kournikova". The song "Častan policajac" featured lyrics written by Riblja Čorba frontman Bora Đorđević. In 2007 the band released the live album Samo Supermen Srbiju spašava (Only Superman Saves the Serbs, a parody of Serbian motto Samo sloga Srbina spasava). The album was recorded on December 8, 2006, in Coupe club in Pančevo, and featured three studio songs as bonus tracks: "Nisam dijamant", "Obećo si mito (Blažo bekrijo)" (a cover of Azra's version of song "Mito bekrijo" by folk music singer Hanka Paldum), and "Vranjanka".

=== 2010s ===
In 2010, the band recorded the single "Alez 2010", a rerecorded version of the song "Alez Yugoslavia" featuring altered lyrics and song title, dedicated to the Serbia national football team, which at the time had played at the 2010 FIFA World Cup. In 2011, the recording of the band's performance at the 2010 Belgrade Beer Fest was released on the DVD LIVE@Belgrade Beer Fest 2010. The DVD contains 17 songs, and all the funds raised from the album sale were dedicated to the Assembly of the City of Belgrade action Beogradski bebi klub (Belgrade Baby Club). In October 2011, the band released the song "Živele žene" ("Viva Women"), a cover of Elvis Presley song "Viva Las Vegas".

On December 13, 2014, the band celebrated 20 years of activity with two performances in two different cities: one on Concert of the Year festival, in Novi Sad Spens Hall, and the second, their solo concert, in Belgrade club Fest.

Milutin Petrović died on December 10, 2016, a day before his 49th birthday.

In June 2018, prior to the 2018 FIFA World Cup, the band released the third version of "Alez Yugoslavia", entitled "Allez Allez 2018", dedicated to the Serbia national football team competing in the World Cup.

== Legacy ==
In 2000, the song "Dule Savić" was polled No.99 on Rock Express Top 100 Yugoslav Rock Songs of All Times list.

== Discography ==
=== Studio albums ===
- Plagijati i obrade (1996)
- Seks, droga i Bodiroga (1998)
- Pare ne vraćamo (2002)

=== Live albums ===
- Igra rokenrol SR Jugoslavija (1995)
- Shipu ga Žobla! (2000)
- Samo Supermen Srbiju spašava (2007)

=== Video albums ===
- LIVE@Belgrade Beer Fest 2010 (2011)
