= U osvit zadnjeg dana =

Studio album by Bjesovi
- Released: 1991
- Recorded: October 1990 "O" Studio, Belgrade
- Genre: Alternative rock
- Length: 29:44
- Label: Sound Galaxy; AK 100-589
- Producer: Igor Borojević

Bjesovi chronology
U osvit zadnjeg dana (1991)	Bjesovi (1993)

U osvit zadnjeg dana (trans. At the Break of the Last Day) is the debut album by the Serbian rock band Bjesovi, released in 1991.

== Track listing ==
All tracks by Goran Marić and Zoran Marinković except where noted.

1. "Zašto ovo ne bi bila ljubav" (02:39)
2. "Džordžija" (Philippe Soupault, Zoran Marinković) (04:09)
3. "Mislim na nju" (01:54)
4. "On je sam" (03:49)
5. "Meni ne treba ljubav" (02:12)
6. "Dođi" (02:26)
7. "Vule bule" (Tomi Sovilj) (02:06)
8. "Dok postojim" (02:27)
9. "Želja" (02:46)
10. "Zli dusi" (Goran Marić, Gospel of Luke, Zoran Marinković, Zoran Niketić, Alexander Pushkin) (05:16)

== Personnel ==
- Božidar Tanasković (bass)
- Goran Ugarčina (drums)
- Predrag Dabić (guitar)
- Zoran Filipović (guitar)
- Goran Marić (vocals)
- Zoran Marinković (vocals)
- Dejan Marinković (vocals on track 4)
- Nikola Slavković (guitar on track 8)
- Vladimir Vesović (guitar on track 10)
