= Tomi Sovilj i Njegove Siluete =

Yugoslav music group

- Tomi Sovilj i Njegove Siluete in 1966

Background information
- Origin: Belgrade, SR Serbia, SFR Yugoslavia
- Genres: Rock and roll; beat music
- Years active: 1964-1970
- Labels: Diskos, Croatia Records
- Past members: Tomi Sovilj; Slobodan Saničanin; Branislav Rakočević; Milorad Tomić; Ðino Maljoković; Tomislav Ðurković; Boba Voratović; Hamdija Vladović; Dušan Prelević

Tomi Sovilj i Njegove Siluete (Serbian Cyrillic: Томи Совиљ и Његове Силуете; trans. Tommy Sovilj and His Silhouettes) were a Yugoslav beat group formed in Belgrade in 1964. They were one of the pioneers of the Yugoslav rock scene.

In 1964, after leaving the band Siluete, vocalist Tomislav "Tomi" Sovilj formed his own band with the same name. After a court verdict forbidding his band to perform under the name Siluete, the band was renamed to Tomi Sovilj i Njegove Siluete. The band gained large popularity with their live performances, but disbanded at the beginning of 1970, with the arrival of new trends on the Yugoslav rock scene.

== History ==
=== 1964-1970 ===
Vocalist Tomislav "Tomi" Sovilj, born in Belgrade in 1941, started his career in 1963, performing occasionally with Zlatni Dečaci (The Golden Boys) on dance parties. On Autumn of the same year, he had become the member of Siluete (The Silhouettes), but in mid-1964 he left the band, forming a band also called Siluete. For a while, there were two groups working under the same name, but the case was settled after a court verdict after which Sovilj lost the right to use the name. However, he did manage to keep the name somewhat similar by renaming it to Tomi Sovilj i Njegove Siluete (Tomi Sovilj and His Silhouettes).

The band, beside Sovilj, featured former Bele Zvezde (White Stars) members Slobodan Saničanin (guitar), Branislav Rakočević (bass guitar), Milorad Tomić (guitar) and Ðino Maljoković (drums). Owing to their attractive performances, they had become one of the most popular live acts in Belgrade, which provided them with often live performances at the Belgrade Mažestik hotel tea parties and at the cafe bar Terazije. The group's performance in Mažestik would often be visited by up to 2,000 young people. In October 1964 the band performed at the Vatromet ritma (Fireworks of Rhythm) festival in Novi Sad Fair, alongside Faraoni, Elipse, Detlići, Siluete and Crveni Koralji. The band enjoyed large popularity and gained attention of the press. In both 1964 and 1965 the band was voted the third best band in Yugoslavia in the poll organized by the music magazine Ritam.

At the beginning of 1966 the band performed on the Gitarijada festival in Belgrade Fair – Hall 1, entering the finals, and went on a tour across Serbia and Macedonia with singers Nina Spirova and Anica Zubović. Later that year the band released their debut EP Vule bule through Diskos record label. At the time of the EP recording the band members were Tomi Sovilj, Milorad Tomić (guitar), Tomislav Ðurković (rhythm guitar), Boba Voratović (bass guitar) and Hamdija Vladović (drums). The EP featured the songs "Vule bule", a cover version of the Sam The Sham and The Pharaos song "Wooly Bully", "Hej, o Slupi", a cover of The McCoys song "Hang On Sloopy", "Džini Džini", a cover Little Richard's "Jenny, Jenny", all three having lyrics rewritten in Serbian language, and a cover of the old town music standard "Za jedan časak radosti" ("For a Moment of Joy"), written by Darko Kraljić. The EP had been sold in more than fifty thousand copies, thus becoming a silver record.

On Autumn of the same year, Sovilj went to serve the Yugoslav People's Army, and was temporarily replaced by the former Juniori (The Juniors) vocalist Dušan Prelević. On Sovilj's return, the band released their second EP Stoj Džoni (Stop, Johnny). The title track was a cover version of Chuck Berry's "Johnny B. Goode". The EP also featured the songs "Detroit Siti" (a cover of Bobby Bare song "Detroit City"), "Ako odeš" ("If You Leave", a cover of the song "Blue Turns to Grey" written by Mick Jagger and Keith Richards) and "Tenesi vals" (a cover of Pee Wee King song "Tennessee Waltz"). This EP had also reached high sales and went silver. After the EP release, the band popularity had slowly decreased and Sovilj disbanded the band in 1970.

=== Post breakup ===
After the band disbandment, Sovilj recorded a solo single "Nojeva barka" ("Noah's Arc"), with "Plava pesma" ("A Blue Song") as the single B-side, released by Diskos in 1970. Afterward, he had moved to the United States where he performed at local clubs. His last recording was the song "Veseli vod" ("A Cheerful Squad") with the choir of the Bratstvo i jedinstvo (Brotherhood and Unity) military high school, released on the PGP-RTB military music album Kad truba zove (When the Trumpet is Calling) in 1974, and his last live appearance was at the Rock naše mladosti (Rock of Our Youth) concert held at the Belgrade Trade Union Hall in December 1985. He had moved to Switzerland, where he currently lives.

Both "Stoj Džoni" and "Vule bule" were included on the box set Kad je rock bio mlad - Priče sa istočne strane (1956-1970) (When Rock Was Young - East Side Stories (1956-1970)), released by Croatia Records in 2005 and featuring songs by the pioneering Yugoslav rock acts.

== Legacy ==
The song "Stoj Džoni" was covered by Serbian and Yugoslav garage rock/punk rock band Partibrejkers on their eponymous debut album in 1985. In February 1992, actor and former The Kids and Rock City Angels member Johnny Depp appeared as guest at a Partibrejkers live show in the SKC club, performing "Stoj Džoni" with the band.

The song "Vule bule" was covered by the Serbian alternative rock band Bjesovi on their 1991 debut album U osvit zadnjeg dana (At Dawn of the Last Day).

== Discography ==
=== Extended plays ===
- Vule bule (1966)
- Stoj Džoni (1967)
