= Lihnida kajče veslaše =

Lihnida kajče veslaše (Macedonian: Лихнида кајче веслаше, "Lihnida was rowing a rowboat") is a Macedonian newly composed folk song. It tells the story of a bereaved woman rowing on Lake Ohrid, and her brief discussion with fishermen (described as "old friends"). They promise that they will calm the waves should they make any, but she replies that she wants them to stop worrying about it, and to leave her and the lake in peace. The music was composed by Efto Pupinoski and the text was written by Miroslav Kuzman for the 1986 Folk Fest Valandovo (a music festival for newly composed Macedonian folk music held in Valandovo) where it was performed by Efto Pupinoski who won first place. The song would soon after be translated to Serbo-Croatian and released as a cover version by Serbian singer Miki Jevremović under the title Lihnida. In 1994, Bulgarian singer Panajot Panajotov performed Ohridskoto ezero (Bulgarian: Охридското езеро, "Lake Ohrid"), a song with the same melody, theme and motifs but with the text adapted to Bulgarian by Živko Kolev.

"Lihnida" (from Greek Λυχνιτίδα) is an ancient name for the city Ohrid and its lake.
