= Mi (band) =

Yugoslav rock band

- The best known Mi lineup in 1970, from left to right: Joško Krnčević, Mirko Vukšić, Neven Mijat, Nikica Šprljan, Siniša Škarica, Slaven Beban, Aljoša Gojanović

Background information
- Origin: Šibenik, SR Croatia, SFR Yugoslavia
- Genres: Beat music; rhythm and blues; soul; jazz rock
- Years active: 1965–1973 (Reunions: 2001, 2002, 2005, 2022)
- Labels: Jugoton, KooX Records, Croatia Records
- Past members: Neven Mijat; Berislav Baranović; Mirko Vukšić; Siniša Škarica; Nikica Šprljan; Aljoša Gojanović; Joško Krnčević; Slaven Beban; Ivan Žurić; Zoran Košuljandić; Tom Martin; Željko Baljkas

Mi (trans. We) were a Croatian and Yugoslav rock band formed in Šibenik in 1965. Initially performing beat music, the group later added a brass section and moved towards rhythm and blues and soul, achieving large popularity and–as other 1960s Yugoslav bands–playing a pioneering role on the Yugoslav rock scene. The original incarnation of the band ended its activity in 1971, part of the members continuing as Mi with a group of younger musicians, finally disbanding in 1973. Since 2001, Mi have made several one-off reunions, releasing a live and a compilation album with previously unreleased recordings.

== History ==
=== 1965–1967: Beat years ===
The band Mi was formed in 1965, when members of Šibenik groups Mjesečari (The Moon Walkers), formed in 1961, and Magneti (The Magnets), formed in 1962, decided to start a new band. The first lineup of the newly-formed band comprised Neven Mijat (vocals and keyboards), Berislav Baranović (guitar), Mirko Vukšić (guitar), Siniša Škarica (bass guitar), Nikica Šprljan (drums), and Aljoša Gojanović (saxophone), all of them high-school graduates at the time. Prior to the band formation, most of them performed in school orchestras, and in their early teens often played brass instruments during funeral processions. The newly-formed group held rehearsals during the summer of 1965, but temporarily split up in autumn, as they enrolled in faculties in different cities. They reunited for a concert held in Šibenik's Yugoslav People's Army Hall, held on 29 November (celebrated in SFR Yugoslavia as Republic Day), performing under the name Šibenčani (Šibenians). During the summer of 1966, they held regular performances in hotel Krka's garden. Soon, they got an opportunity to record two songs for Television Zagreb show Mladi na ekranu (Youth on Screen), recording the song "Školjka" ("Seashell"), originally performed by the band Uragani from Rijeka, and their original song "Ti nećeš doći" ("You're Not Coming"). After occasional performances in their hometown, in autumn of the same year, they moved to Zagreb, where they started holding regular performances on dance parties in Youth Club Center, appearing under the name Beat Grupa Mi (Beat Band We).

Mi soon achieved local popularity, with Mijatović's vocals gaining praise from the Zagreb youth. The band held their first solo concert on 9 March 1967 in the cinema Zagreb. At the end of the concert, the ecstatic audience trashed the hall. On International Workers' Day 1967, they performed in their home town, but without Baranović, who had decided to retire from music. In late summer 1967, Gojanović moved to the Zagreb band Roboti, and Mijat, Vukšić, Škarica and Šprljan continued as a quartet, performing popular hippie hits of the time.

=== 1968–1973: Rhythm and blues and soul years ===
Gojanović returned to Mi in early 1968, and the group was also joined by trumpet player and another former Mjesečari member Joško Krnčević. The new lineup of the band made a turn towards rhythm and blues and soul music. On the Pop maraton (Pop Marathon) battle of the bands, held in Zagreb's Kulušić club during five initial months of 1968, Mi were polled the best band by the audience. During the summer of 1968, they performed on Noći hipija (Hippie Nigths), held in Students' Cultural Center in Zagreb, their concerts becoming the club's most popular program. The band ended their stint in the club in order to perform in clubs in Northern Italy. At the end of December 1968, the group won the second place at the Festival of Yugoslav Beat Music held at Belgrade Fair. In February 1969, after performing in the Wanted Saloon club in Milan, they were offered a contract by an Italian record label, but the band declined as the members wanted to finish their studies. In early 1969, the band's brass section was complete with the arrival of tenor saxophone player Slaven Beban, formerly of the band Makedo. The Yugoslav music press praised the band's sound and musicianship, and at the end of the year, Mi were polled the Best Yugoslav Band by the readers of the music magazine Pop Express.

In early 1970, the band recorded several songs for Radio Zagreb, choosing the songs "Dijana" and Sjećanja" ("Memorries") for their debut 7-inch single. The group appeared at the Zagreb '70 music festival, performing their song "Dijana" and playing as a backing band for popular singers Josipa Lisac, Dalibor Brun and Miro Ungar. The band also appeared on the pop festival Vaš šlager sezone (Your Schlager of the Season), performing the song "U cara Trojana kozje uši" (the title and the song inspired by the folk fairy tale "The Goat's Ears of the Emperor Trojan"), composed by Esad Arnautalić, but came among last following the voting. Following the festival appearance, the band appeared in the popular Television Belgrade show Maksimetar (Maximeter), performing a cover of Chicago song "Make Me Smile" entitled "Tad sam sretan" ("When I'm Happy"). In May 1970, the group appeared at the Subotica Youth Festival, with Mijat's song "Ljubav ti više nije važna" ("Love Doesn't Mean Anything to You No More"), and were awarded the second place by the festival's jury. Ten years later, the song would appear on the festival's official double compilation album 20 godina festivala Omladina (20 Years of Youth Festival). On 25 May of the same year, celebrated in SFR Yugoslavia as Youth Day, the band, alongside Dubrovački Trubaduri, Josipa Lisac, Džentlmeni and Azra Halilović, performed in Belgrade Youth Center for Yugoslav president Josip Broz Tito. Alongside their own songs, Mi also performed the traditional song "Lepe ti je Zagorje zelene" ("How Beautiful Green Zagorje Is"), accompanied by a traditional music orchestra. At the end of the year, Mirko Vukšić left the group, deciding to dedicate himself to his studies of medicine. After he completed his studies, he got an employment as a physician, and later moved to Switzerland, where he still resides. He was replaced by Vedran Božić, formerly of the bands Grešnici, Roboti and Wheels of Fire.

In early 1971, Mi released the 7-inch single with the songs "Bam bam ba ba lu bam" and "Ljubav ti više nije važna", the former becoming the band's biggest hit. The band announced their "rock symphony" entitled "Poema o Ani" ("Poem of Anna"), with libretto written by Škarica and songwriter Željko Sabol, but the work was never completed. In the summer of 1971, the group released their final 7-inch single, with Chicago-influenced jazz rock songs "Jednog od ovih dana" ("One of These Days") and "La-la-la". Following the single release, their label Jugoton offered them an opportunity to record a full-length album, but the band members nevertheless decided to split up. The original incarnation of the group had their last appearance on 31 December 1971, on Television Zagreb New Year's Eve program.

In early 1972, Škarica and Gojanović reformed the band with a group of younger musicians: Ivan Žurić (guitar), Zoran Košuljandić (guitar, vocals), and Tom Martin (drums). After they were joined by guitarist Željko Baljkas, they started performing under the name Novi Mi (The New We). The group held their last concerts during the summer of 1973 in Imperijal hotel in Vodice and in Belgrade's Marina.

=== Post breakup ===
After the original incarnation of Mi disbanded in 1971, Neven Mijat became an assistant professor at the Zagreb Faculty of Electrical Engineering. He is currently a professor at the same faculty. Vedran Božić moved to the newly-formed band Time, achieving nationwide popularity with the group.

Following the disbandment of Mi, Škarica became an editor for Jugoton record label. He is often credited for signing some of the most prominent acts of the Yugoslav rock scene, especially of the Yugoslav new wave scene. He has written articles on music for a number of magazines.

=== 2001–2022: Occasional reunions ===
The members of the group reunited in 2001, having their comeback appearance at the Festival of Dalmatian Chanson, on 17 August 2001, performing their songs "Sjećanja" and "Bam bam ba ba lu bam", as well as a cover of "Knock on Wood". On 12 August 2002, they held a concert in Šibenik's main square; for the performance of "Bam bam ba ba lu bam" they were joined by Šibenik Orchestra of Folk Music. In 2003, the band's live album 15 živih komada (15 Live Pieces), was released as a gift CD with the first issue of Croatian music magazine KooX. The album included songs performed by the band during their 1971 summer tour, originally recorded with Uher portable reel-to-reel tape recorder, audio recordings of their 1970 TV appearance, as well as the band's version of "I Got You (I Feel Good)" from their 2002 Šibenik concert. Alongside the band's own songs, the album includes covers of songs by James Brown, Chicago and Blood, Sweat & Tears. The following year, the compilation album 16 originala '61–'71 (16 Original Songs '61–'71) was released, featuring songs from the band's 7-inch singles, as well as recordings made for Radio Zagreb. In 2005, Croatia Records released the six-piece box set Kad je rock bio mlad – Priče sa istočne strane (1956–1970) (When Rock Was Young – East Side Stories (1956–1970)), featuring songs by the pioneering Yugoslav rock acts. The album included three Mi songs – "Plesač (Jive Man)", "Gimme Some Lovin'" and "Hold On, I'm Comin'". The release was accompanied by Škarica's book of the same title, the promotions of which featured live performances by Mi.

In 2020, a documentary about the band was released, entitled Put do slave – na vrhu (Path to Fame – On the Top) and directed by Stanko Ferić and Ivo Kuzmanić. The band's original guitarist Berislav Baranović died on 16 September 2020.

The band had their last one-off reunion in 2022, when they performed with Neven Mijat's daughter, singer Dora Mijat at the Festival of Dalmatian Chanson, winning first place with the soul ballad "Najbolje od mene" ("Best of Me"), composed by Dora Mijat.

== Discography ==
=== Singles ===
- "Dijana" / "Sjećanja" (1970)
- "Bam bam ba ba lu bam" / "Ljubav ti više nije važna" (1971)
- "Jednog od ovih dana" / "La-la-la" (1971)

=== Live albums ===
- 15 živih komada (2003)

=== Compilation albums ===
- 16 originala '61–'71 (2004)
