= Sve što vidim i sve što znam =

Studio album by Bjesovi
- Released: 1997
- Recorded: April 1996 – May 1997 "O" Studio, Belgrade
- Genre: Alternative rock
- Length: 42:18
- Label: Metropolis Records; MCD 011
- Producer: Ivan Kljajić, Bjesovi

Bjesovi chronology
Bjesovi (1993)	Sve što vidim i sve što znam (1997)	Na živo (2002)

Sve što vidim i sve što znam (Serbian Cyrillic: Све што видим и све што знам; trans. All I See and All I Know) is the third album by the Serbian rock band Bjesovi, released in 1997.

== Track listing ==
All written by Goran Marić and Zoran Marinković, except where noted.

1. "Verujem" (5:50)
2. "Probudi me" (4:32)
3. "Kad mi stane dah" (5:23)
4. "Sve što vidim i sve što znam" (3:58)
5. "Dar"(3:25)
6. "Raduj se" (2:08)
7. "Sve će se doznati" (3:22) (Monty Norman, Goran Marić, Zoran Marinković)
8. "Moj izbor" (14:08) (Igor Malešević, Goran Marić, Zoran Marinković)

== Personnel ==
- Božidar Tanasković (bass)
- Igor Malešević (drums)
- Predrag Dabić (guitar)
- Zoran Filipović (guitar)
- Goran Marić (vocals)
- Zoran Marinković (vocals)
- Dragoljub Marković (keyboards on tracks 2 and 7)
- Vladimir Nikić (contrabass on track 3)
- Svetlana Spajić (vocals on track 4)
- Goran Đorđević (percussion)
