= Boba Stefanović =

Serbian and Yugoslav singer and songwriter (1946–2015)

- Boba Stefanović at the beginning of his solo career

Background information
- Born: Slobodan Stefanović; 21 May 1946; Belgrade, PR Serbia, FPR Yugoslavia
- Died: 9 February 2015 (aged 68) Belgrade, Serbia
- Genres: Beat music; rock; pop; pop rock; schlager
- Occupation: Singer
- Instruments: Vocals, guitar
- Years active: 1962-2012
- Labels: PGP-RTB, Bellaphon Records, Diskoton, Beograd Disk, PGP-RTS, BK Sound

Slobodan "Boba" Stefanović (Serbian Cyrillic: Слободан "Боба" Стефановић; 21 May 1946 – 9 February 2015) was a Serbian and Yugoslav singer and songwriter. He was one of the leading stars of the Yugoslav pop scene in the 1970s.

Stefanović started his musical career in 1962 as the vocalist of the rock band Zlatni Dečaci, with which he achieved nationwide popularity. He left the band in 1967, deciding to dedicate himself to his solo career. He graduated from the Belgrade Faculty of Dramatic Arts and during the late 1960s and the 1970s he released three studio albums and a large number of EPs and 7" singles with which he achieved large mainstream popularity. His popularity declined in the 1980s, and during the 1990s and 2000s he performed live occasionally only, dedicating himself to other activities, until 2012, when he had his last public performance.

== Musical career ==
=== With Zlatni Dečaci (1962-1967) ===
Stefanović started his career in 1962, as the frontman of the rock band Zlatni Dečaci (The Golden Boys). The band gained the attention of the public with their live performances, on which they performed covers of rock hits and instrumental versions of classical pieces. Thanks to Nikola Karaklajić, a national chess champion and radio personality, who took the band's demo recordings to the Netherlands, Dutch record label Fontana Records got interested in the band, so, in 1965, Zlatni Dečaci released their debut record, a 7" single with the songs "Swan Lake" (a version of a theme from Pyotr Ilyich Tchaikovsky's opera Swan Lake) and "Humoresque" (a version of a humoresque by Antonín Dvořák), for the label, thus becoming the first Yugoslav rock band to release a record for the foreign market. The band's popularity in Yugoslavia grew, Zlatni Dečaci eventually becoming one of the most popular Yugoslav bands of the 1960s. The band released three EPs in Yugoslavia, appeared in numerous TV shows and recorded numerous tunes for radio stations. In 1966 the band held several performances in Great Britain. Stefanović left the band in 1967, after his solo performance on the Belgrade Spring festival. The band continued with the new vocalist for a while, but disbanded soon after.

=== Solo career (1967-2012) ===
After he left Zlatni Dečaci, Stefanović graduated from the Belgrade Faculty of Dramatic Arts and started his solo career as a pop singer. He released his debut solo record, the EP Kraj leta (End of Summer) in 1967.

In 1973 he released his first full-length album, Ako si me drugačije zamišljala oprosti... (If You Imagined I'm Different, Forive Me...). On the album he was backed by Radio Television Zagreb Dance Orchestra, Radio Television Belgrade Revue Orchestra and Radio Television Sarajevo Revue Orchestra. Songs on the album were composed by Aleksandar Korać, Nikica Kalogjera and Vojkan Borisavljević, with lyrics written by Ivica Krajač, Olivera Borisavljević and Zvonimir Skerl. For his second studio album, Autoportret (Self-portrait), released in 1976, Stefanović authored all the songs. Members of Korni Grupa Josip Boček (guitar), Bojan Hreljac (bass guitar), Vladimir "Furda" Furduj (drums) and Kornelije Kovač (keyboards) played on the album as the studio band. On the album recording Stefanović played harmonica, acoustic guitar and percussion. The track "Ona, ona, ona" ("She, She, She") featured Radio Television Belgrade Revue Orchestra conducted by Vojislav Simić. His third album, Boba (1979), featured music and lyrics authored by Stefanović, but also by Zdenko Runjić (music), Đorđe Novković (music), Jakov Džolić (lyrics), Marina Tucaković (lyrics), Nena Labić (lyrics) and Biljana Petrović (both music and lyrics). His fourth studio album, Tornado (1983) was more rock-oriented than his previous solo releases. The songs on the album were written by Stefanović, who also played guitar on the album recording. Guitar on the recording was also played by Josip Boček and by former Zlatni Dečaci member Velibor "Borko" Kacl, bass guitar was played by Goce Dimitrovski and Kire Mitrev, drums were played by Lazar Tošić, and keyboards were played by Laza Ristovski. The album featured a country version of Stefanović's old hit "Obriši suze, draga" ("Wipe Off Your Tears, My Darling"). On his fifth studio album, Evergreen Man (1987), he recorded covers of the songs "Anastasia", "If You Go Away", "Jezbel", "You Mean Everything to Me", "My Way" and other evergreen hits. On the album he was accompanied by Radio Television Belgrade Big Band. Stefanović released his last studio album, entitled To je to (That's It) in 2001; on this album he was once again author of all the songs.

During his career Stefanović released three EPs and 26 7" singles. In 1976 he released a German language single for the German market under the name Stefan Boba. With his songs he won first prizes on Skopje Festival, Opatija Festival, Vaš šlager sezone (You're Schlager of the Season) festival and Belgrade Spring festival (where he won First Prize on three occasions). He had also won the Golden Orpheus festival in Bulgaria, the Brașov festival in Romania and the Man and the Sea festival in Rostock in East Germany.

At the beginning of the 1970s, Stefanović was, for a short time, a member of the group One i Oni (Them Girls and Them Boys), which consisted of him, Minja Subota, Lidija Kodrič and Daliborka Stojišić, and which performed mostly in the Soviet Union and other countries of the Eastern Bloc. In 1991 Stefanović provided vocals for the Solunske pesme (Songs from the Salonica front) EP, which featured Serbian patriotic songs from World War I. He also wrote songs for singers Beti Đorđević, Nada Knežević and Biljana Petrović.

Stefanović had his last public performance in 2012, on the Spring in Belgrade concert in Ilija M. Kolarac Endowment, where he performed his hit "Obriši suze, draga". Health problems forced him to retire from singing.

== Other activities ==
With Lokica Stefanović, Boban Stefanović formed the dance troupe Jazz-Ball, and later the dance troupe Bobete (Bobettes). At the beginning of the 1990s, Stefanović started his own singing school, which was attended by Vlado Georgiev, Ceca Slavković, Filip Žmaher and other prominent artists from the Serbian scene.

He wrote the book Prva ljubav Dušana Silnog (First Love of Dušan the Mighty), which he illustrated with his own paintings, and which was published with the music Stefanović composed as the soundtrack to the story.

He made an appearance as a guitar player in Živko Nikolić's 1986 film The Beauty of Vice.

== Death ==
Stefanović died in Belgrade on 9 February 2015, at the age of 69.

== Discography ==
=== With Zlatni Dečaci ===
==== EPs ====
- Labuđe jezero (1966)
- Čudna devojka (1966)
- Sadko (1967)

==== Singles ====
- "Swan Lake" / "Humoresque" (1965)
- Muzika iz filma Kuda posle kiše (1967)

=== Solo ===
==== Studio albums ====
- Ako si me drugačije zamišljala oprosti... (1973)
- Autoportret (1976)
- Boba (1979)
- Tornado (1983)
- Evergreen Man (1987)
- To je to (2001)

==== Compilations ====
- Boba Stefanović (1998)

==== EPs ====
- Kraj leta (1967)
- Pisma tebi (1968)
- Moja stara gitara (1970)

==== Singles ====
- "Svako mora imati nekog" / "Daj mi, daj" (1970)
- "Obriši suze, draga" / "Kada te nema" (1970)
- "Od proleća cvetnog do beloga sna" (flexi disc; 1970)
- "Bolno srce plače" / "Moja ljubljena" (1971)
- "Čuvaj se vatre" / "Budi samo moja" (1972)
- "Ljubica" / "Tvoj prvi ples" (1972)
- "Za tvoju ljubav živim" / "Jedna crnka dugokosa" (1972)
- "Klečim i molim" / "Plačimo zajedno" (1973)
- "Bez tebe ne mogu" / "Ostani moja" (1973)
- "Mari, Mari" / "Oprosti mi, Mari" (1973)
- "Piši mi" / "Kome da dam" (1973)
- "Vrati mi snove za dvoje" / "Nema, nema nje" (1974)
- "Koliko te volim" / "Hiljadu gitara" (1974)
- "Ruže" / "Oči drage žene" (1975)
- "Kažu mi da si još uvek sama" / "Jedna noć sa tobom" (1975)
- "Vodite me njoj" / "Dok te ljubi on" (1976)
- "Dan ljubavi" / "Ostavi sve" (With Bisera Veletanlić, Nada Knežević and Beti Đorđević; 1975)
- "Ona, ona, ona" / "Ja bih hteo" (1976)
- "Nie Kann Etwas Schöner Sein" / "In Meiner Einsamkeit..." (1976)
- "Živim tako sam" / "Ne mogu bez tebe" (1977)
- "Hiljadu mandolina" / "Čovek sa gitarom" (1977)
- "Sudbino" / "Nikada" (1978)
- "Ala mi je, pa mi je" / "Ima, ima, ima..." (With Dragan Toković; 1978)
- "Da li si noćas sama" / "Kad bi znala" (1978)
- "Vrati se ljubavi" / "U 'Super salonu'" (1978)
- "A onda šta" / "Da li neko zna" (1979)
