= Cacadou Look =

Croatian pop rock band

- Origin: Opatija, Yugoslavia (now Croatia)
- Genres: Power pop
- Years active: 1983–1991
- Labels: Jugoton
- Past members: Jasmina Simić; Tatjana Simić; Suzana Kožić; Tamara Vrančić; Sandra Vrančić; Giovanna Kirinić; Alenka Mendiković
- Website: Cacadou Look on Myspace

Cacadou Look was a five-piece pop rock band from Opatija, Croatia that was the first Yugoslav all-female band to release a long play record.

Cacadou Look's debut Tko mari za čari (1987) was the first album by an all-female Yugoslav band.

Cacadou Look was formed in Opatija in 1983. They were not the first all-female band in Yugoslavia — at the time, already active were Tožibabe from Ljubljana and Boye from Novi Sad — but they were the first to achieve a degree of mainstream popularity, helped by radio play of their two demo tracks, "Sama" and "Kao pjesma" (both 1987), and by TV appearances such as those on Stereovizija, a popular 1980s music show broadcast by Radio Television Zagreb.

Their first album Tko mari za čari (Jugoton, 1987) was produced by Husein Hasanefendić and Tomo in der Mühlen, and featured a guest appearance by Vlada Divljan. The album yielded three hit songs: "Sama", "Kao pjesma" and "Tako lako". Apart from "Tako lako", a cover of Buddy Holly's "It's So Easy", and "Ne dozvoli", which was written by Divljan, all songs on the album were composed by the band. Despite these accomplishments, the band found working in the men-dominated music scene difficult at times, and occasional malicious remarks motivated them to work even harder.

Their second and equally successful album Uspavanka za Zoroa was released in 1989. Hit tracks from the album were "Baum bam bam", "Budi mi prijatelj", and "Krenite s nama", the latter a cover of Bryan Ferry's "Let's Stick Together". An English version of "Budi mi prijatelj" — named "Be My Friend" — was also recorded, appearing on Yu-Go Pop (Jugoton, 1990), a compilation of Yugoslav pop and rock artists performing their songs in English.

Cacadou Look played their last gig in Zagreb on 25 May 1991. Members of the band were not willing to start solo careers — seeing them as meaningless without the band teamwork — and left the music scene.

== Members ==
- Jasmina Simić (vocals)
- Tatjana Simić (drums)
- Suzana Kožić (bass)
- Tamara Vrančić (keyboards) (1983–1985)
- Sandra Vrančić (guitar) (1983–1984)
- Giovanna Kirinić (guitar) (from 1985)
- Alenka Mendiković (keyboards) (from 1986)

== Discography ==
- Tko mari za čari (Jugoton,1987)
- Uspavanka za Zoroa (Jugoton,1989)

== See also ==
- Popular music in Croatia
- Popular music in Yugoslavia
