= Pop Express =

Yugoslav music magazine (1969–1970)

- Cover of the 4th issue, released on 24 March 1969
- Editor-in-Chief: Mirko Klarin and Darko Stuparić
- Categories: Music magazine
- Frequency: Semimonthly
- Publisher: Center for Cultural Activity of Zagreb Youth
- Founded: 1969
- First issue: 10 February 1969
- Final issue: 17 January 1970
- Country: Yugoslavia
- Language: Serbo-Croatian

Pop Express was a Yugoslav music magazine that got published in Zagreb for less than a year during the 1969–1970 time frame. Although short-lived, Pop Express is notable as one of the most prominent 1960s rock publications in Yugoslavia, making large influence on the country's 1970s music press.

== History ==
Pop Express was launched in 1969, the first issue appearing on 10 February, with the price of one Yugoslav dinar. It was published by Center for Cultural Activity of Zagreb Youth, every second Monday in a month. The magazine's editor-in-chiefs were Mirko Klarin and Darko Stuparić. The first nine issues were printed in color, and the subsequent issues were printed in black and white. Initially, Pop Express published news, columns, concert reviews and interviews with international music stars, while later issues also published texts from the fields of sociology and sexology, as well as underground literature and comics. The magazine's design and visual identity were inspired by hippie movement and underground newspapers like International Times.

The 13th issue of the magazine was withdrawn from the market on the order of the authorities, allegedly because of a homosexual personal ad. In an interview for the documentary series Rockovnik, music historian Vladimir Spičanović said about the issue:

It was probably [...] the only [Yugoslav] music magazine to have one of its issues banned. [...] The 13th issue was banned, not because of a written piece about music, but because of a letter sent in by a reader. Ever since then I've been trying — there were about ten readers' letters that got published in the issue — to find out which particular letter got it banned, and I haven't been able to find out why. Today, you can read it ten times over, but there's no chance you'll find out. It was so naive, so benign, that it's now ridiculous, but someone had a problem with it, and that issue was banned.

The last, 23rd issue of the magazine was released on 17 January 1970.

== Journalists and contributors ==
Some of the journalists and contributors to Pop Express include:

- Ranko Antonić
- Ivica Balić (photographs)
- Aleksandar Brnetić
- Veljko Despot
- Darko Glavan
- Mišo Gunjača
- Zvonko Ivić Miljak (graphic design)
- Mladen Mazur
- Deša Mikotin
- Toni Nardić
- Dragana Nedeljković
- Nikola Nešković
- Gordan Novak (photographs)
- Saša Novaković (photographs)
- Zoran Pavlović (graphic design)
- Maja Perfiljeva
- Raša Petrović
- Siniša Škarica
- Igor Tales
