= Deca Loših Muzičara =

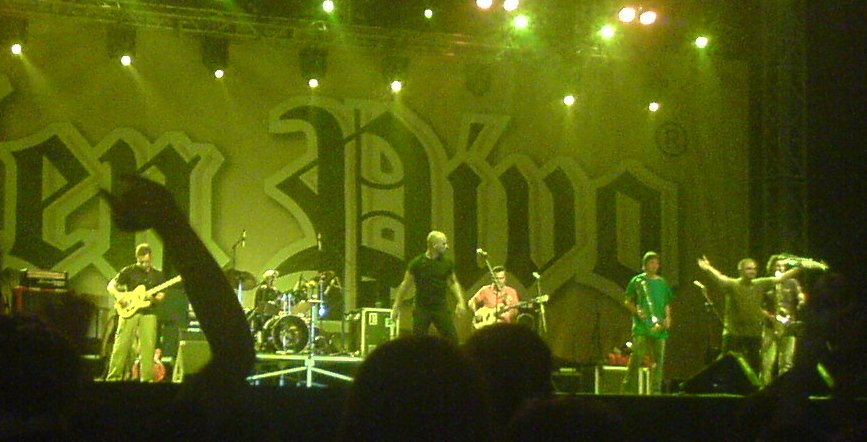
- DLM performing at Belgrade Beer Fest in 2007

Background information
- Also known as: DLM
- Origin: Belgrade, Serbia
- Genre: Funk rock
- Years active: 1988–2009; 2011–present
- Labels: Sorabia Disk, PGP-RTS, Metropolis Records
- Members: Nenad Petrović; Zoran Živković; Zoran Milivojević; Borislav Veličković; Mihajlo Bogosavljević; Lazar Ilić
- Past members: Jova Jović; Aleksandar Siljanovski; Vladan Miljković; Đorđe Anđelić; Ivan Blagojević; Dušan Petrović; Goran Đorđević; Ivan Jevtović
- Website: www.decalosihmuzicara.com

Deca Loših Muzičara (Serbian Cyrillic: Деца Лоших Музичара; transl. Bad Musicians' Children), often abbreviated to DLM, are a Serbian funk rock band formed in Belgrade in 1988. They were one of the most prominent bands of the 1990s Serbian rock scene, gaining significant popularity as well as critical acclaim with their fast and furious but melodic funk rock sound, adorned with trumpet and saxophone lines.

== History ==
=== 1989–2009 ===
The band was formed in 1988 by Jova Jović (guitar), Aleksandar Siljanovski "Silja" (vocals), Zoran Živković (bass guitar), Zoran Milivojević "Mikac" (drums), Vladan Miljković "Milje" (saxophone), Đorđe Anđelić "Kića" (trumpet) and Ivan Blagojević "Uške" (trumpet). Saxophonist Dušan Petrović was also a temporary band member, but soon moved to Plejboj. After Blagojević's departure, trumpet player Borislav "Bora" Veličković joined the band. The band won the first place at the last edition of the Youth Festival in Subotica in 1990, and their song "Doživotno osuđen na ljubav" ("Sentenced to Love for Life ") appeared on the festival official compilation album.

The recording of the band's debut album, Dobardan! (Goodday!), produced by Vlada Žeželj, was finished in early 1992, but, due to political and economic situation in the country, it was a year later that the album was released. Influenced by the at-the-time-popular American rock sound and colored with brass sections, the songs "Kreditna kartica" ("Credit Card"), which partially features lyrics in Slovene (as Siljanovski lived in Slovenia for some time), "Zeka" ("Bunny"), "Ljubomora" ("Jealousy") and "Mara", provided significant airplay to the band. The album also featured two bonus tracks, "Ja sam tvoj čovek" ("I'm Your Man") and "Njena je, njena je" ("It Belongs to Her, It Belongs to Her"). The band got the opportunity to represent FR Yugoslavia at the Music Days festival held in Strasbourg. In the meantime, the band's brass section started recording and occasionally performing with the oi! punk rock band Direktori. The band also appeared in Srđan Dragojević's movie Dva sata kvalitetnog TV programa (Two Hours of Quality TV Programme), performing a cover version of Metak song "Da mi je biti morski pas" ("If I Were a Shark"), which they soon added to their live repertoire.

The band's second album, Prolećni dan (Spring Day), brought the songs "Vlade Divac", dedicated to the famous basketball player, "Konji ritma" ("Rhythm Horses") and the title track, which became essential part of the band's live performances. The song "Ubiše Pabla" ("Pablo Got Killed") featured improvised lyrics in Spanish. The album was produced by the band themselves, and Martin Petrić on percussion and Deže Molnar on saxophone appeared as guests on the album. After the album release, the band recorded a cover version of AC/DC song "Let There Be Rock", which was released on the Radio Boom 93 various artists compilation Ovo je zemlja za nas?!? (This Is the Land for Us?!?). On the Radio Index various artists compilation Nas slušaju svi, mi ne slušamo nikoga (Everybody Listens to Us, We Listen to Nobody), Deca Loših Muzičara appeared with the unplugged version of "Dobardan!", recorded at Belgrade Youth Center, and a cover of the old schlager song "Vi što maštate o sreći" ("You Who Dream of Happiness"), recorded with alternative rock musician Rambo Amadeus.

In 1998, the album Virus was released, featuring the music the band recorded for Dušan Kovačević's theater play of the same name. The album featured the songs "Ljubav" ("Love"), featuring lead vocals by the starring actor Ivan Jevtović, and "Dezodorans" ("Deodorant"), and the rest of the released material consisted of instrumental tracks, including a version of Maurice Ravel's Boléro. During the same year, the band wrote music for another play, Siniša Kovačević's Kraljević Marko (Prince Marko), in which they appeared as live performers and acting minor roles. During the year, the band also appeared on the Drž'te jih! To nisu Niet!!! (Get 'Em! They Are Not Niet!!!) tribute album to the Slovenian band Niet, with the reggae cover of the song "Zastave" ("Flags").

In the late 1990s and early 2000s, the band lost the continuity in their work due to series of unfortunate circumstances: economic situation in Serbia forced part of the band to look for other sources of income, Miljković moved to Slovenia, Siljanovski was injured in a car accident, from which he recovered for almost a year, and then suffered a stroke, from which he recovered for more than a year. After an 8-year discography break, in 2005, the band released a new album ...gde cveta samsung žut (...Where the Yellow Samsung Blooms, named after a verse from the Serbian World War I folk song "Tamo daleko", "Gde cveta limun žut" – "Where the yellow lemon blooms") in a new lineup. Beside Siljanovski, Milivojević, Živković and Veličković, the new members were trombonist Mihajlo Bogosavljević, a former member of Havana Whispers and a member of Del Arno Band, and guitarist Goran Đorđević "Đole". The song lyrics for the album were written by Miljković, who in the meantime had moved to Slovenia. Soon after the album release, Đorđević died of cancer, and was replaced by guitarist Lazar Ilić. During the Spring of the following year, Siljanovski left the band and was replaced by Ivan Jevtović, actor and a long-time friend of the band. In 2009, a live version of the song "Vlade Divac" appeared on Metropolis Records various artists compilation Groovanje devedesete uživo (Grooving '90s Live).

With Jevtović on vocals the band had a large number of performances. However, in June 2009, the group officially announced their disbandment, stating no specific reason.

=== 2011–present ===
In December 2011, the band reunited, having their reunion performance at the Concert of the Year in Novi Sad on 10 December. The band celebrated 20 years since the release of their debut album with a performance on Vračar Rocks Festival on 22 March 2012. In March 2013, the band celebrated 25 years since the beginning of their career by releasing the song "Flora & Fauna". In 2014, the unplugged versions of the band's songs "Disko klub" ("Disco Club") and "Balada o Ćutanu Ječmenici" ("The Ballad of Ćutan Ječmenica") appeared on the various artists live album Parobrod Unplugged, recorded on concerts in Belgrade club Parobrod.

In March 2015, Jevtović left the band. Both him and the rest of the members stated that they mutually agreed to part ways due to Jevtović's acting obligations, and that they would probably cooperate again in the future. The band's new vocalist became Nenad Petrović, with whom the band performed for the first time on 2 May 2015 in Novi Sad.

In 2017, the band released the song "Ludi pas korupcija" ("Mad Dog Corruption"). In 2018, Živković and Ilić recorded a new version of the song "Dobardan!" with the children's choir Čuperak (Tuft), as a part of Deca pevaju rokenrol (Children Sing Rock and Roll) project. In 2019, the band announced they are working on the new studio album. It was announced that the lyrics for the album would be written by former member Vladan Miljković.

== Legacy ==
In 2021, the album Dobardan! was polled 8th on the list of 100 Best Serbian Albums Since the Breakup of SFR Yugoslavia. The list was published in the book Kako (ni)je propao rokenrol u Srbiji (How Rock 'n' Roll in Serbia (Didn't) Come to an End).

In 2006, the song "Dobardan!" was ranked No. 36 on the B92 Top 100 Domestic Songs list. In 2011, the song "Prolećni dan" was polled, by the listeners of Radio 202, one of 60 greatest songs released by PGP-RTB/PGP-RTS during the sixty years of the label's existence.

== Discography ==
=== Studio albums ===
- Dobardan! (1992)
- Prolećni dan (1995)
- Virus (1998)
- ...gde cveta samsung žut (2005)

=== Other appearances ===
- "Let There Be Rock" (Ovo je zemlja za nas?!?; 1997)
- "Dobardan (Unplugged)" / "Vi što maštate o sreći (DLM & Pavke Mix)" (with Rambo Amadeus; Nas slušaju svi, mi ne slušamo nikoga; 1997)
- "Zastave" (Drž'te jih! To nisu Niet!!!; 1998)
- "Vlade Divac" (Groovanje devedesete uživo; 2009)
- "Disko klub" / "Balada o Ćutanu Ječmenici" (Parobrod Unplugged; 2014)
