= LMT Connection =

- Genres: funk
- Years active: 1989 to current
- Members: Leroy Emmanuel; Mark Rogers; John Irvine
- Website: www.lmtconnection.com

LMT Connection is a Niagara-based funk and soul trio. The band has been together since 1989, and have recorded four studio albums. Blending R&B, funk, and jazz, they described their sound as "Universal Soul", which is also the title of their third studio CD, released in the fall of 2003. They've played over 4000 shows, toured Europe six times over the past two years and most recently, they were invited to open for B. B. King.

== History ==
LMT Connection was formed in 1984 when Mark Rogers, while attending a show at a club in Niagara Falls approached Leroy Emmanuel, the guitar player of the featured band that night, and telling him they needed to play together. A year later, Emmanuel returned to Niagara Falls and reunited with Rogers. For four years, Leroy Emmanuel and Mark Rogers toured North America with a 10-piece Motown band which was advertised with "Tight Detroit funk mixed with a fresh, hard hittin' drumming energy.". When the tour came to its end in 1989 the two found added a third member Ottawa native bassist John Irvine, forming LMT Connection.

== Band members ==
- Leroy Emmanuel – lead vocals and guitars
- Mark Rogers – drums
- John Irvine – bassist

The band often shares members with Newworldson, a similar group.

== Discography ==
Their first album, released in 1992, is "Sometime Later", an all-original album of classic, sophisticated R&B. Then in 1999 they followed with "Outta Control", a dynamic CD capturing the energy of their live show. Their third CD "Universal Soul" is an all-original CD combining the elements of classic Soul songwriting with a live-off-the-floor studio performance.

Studio albums

=== Color Me Funky (2006) ===
"Features LMT as opening act for and introduced by the one and only B.B. King at Niagara Falls’ Avalon Ballrooom. LMT's CMF cover art is also very funky, and features original artwork by Emmanuel's talented and highly artistic daughter, Khea. This live CD/DVD recording captures LMT's super high-energy live performances at their recorded best!".

"Color Me Funky" (2006)	Released on Impression Records/ King Brain Music
1. Funk is the Final Frontier	6. I Can't Stop
2. Your Body's Hot	7. Curtis
3. Color Me Funky	8. York Chops
4. Constant Things	9. Wouldn't You Rather Get Down?
5. Party Time	10. Big Bad

=== Universal Soul (2003) ===
Dave Rave, of Teenage Head, said of Universal Soul: "When you listen to this album or when you see LMT Connection play live you will hear true innovation. Clashing styles – jazz against funk, soul against true Rock 'n' Roll, history mixed with mystery. You'll remember the first time you heard Chuck Berry, Wes Montgomery, Soul Train and the funkiest of the funky.".

"Universal Soul" (2003)	Released on United-One / B&3 Records
1. Lately	8. Shiver (Prelude)
2. Another Love Another Time	9. Shiver
3. Don't	10. You Belong To Me, I Belong To You
4. Missing You (Real Audio)	11. Expedition
5. What's it All About	12. Secrets to Success
6. Complain to the Clouds (Real Audio)	7. Things a Man Need

=== Outta Control (1999) ===
Gary of TO Nite said: "unlike in their live show, it doesn't take even a song, let alone a set, to move you right into the worshipsphere; it just kicks in at total high energy from the first track and notches up from there!"

"Outta Control" (1999)	Released on Impression Records
1. Ain't Too Proud To Beg	9. Wah 2 Zee
2. On Broadway (Real Audio)	10. Funky Spoons
3. Johnny B. Good	11. Muddy's Drums & Bottles
4. Payback	12. Big Bad Bottum
5. Cold Sweat (Real Audio)	13. 2AM Bridge
6. Europa	14. Brick House
7. I Feel Good	15. Expedition
8. Give Up The Funk	

=== Sometime Later (1992) ===
Martin Murray of "Pulse Magazine said "their music is also so totally different than anything anyone else is doing in this area, that these guys are pretty much in a class all by themselves. And yes they even managed to include Leroy's spoons solo! A great album from a band who are definitely destined for bigger things."

"Sometime Later" (1992)	Released on Impression Records
1. The Love I Once Knew (Real Audio)	6. You Touched Me
2. Love and Things	7. You Got the Love
3. Things a Man Need	8. Time to Play a Blues
4. Call My Name	5. Sometime Later (Real Audio)
