= Mile Lojpur =

Background information
- Also known as: Mile Najlon
- Born: 4 March 1930; Veliki Bečkerek, Kingdom of Yugoslavia
- Died: 29 July 2005 (aged 75) Belgrade, Serbia, Serbia and Montenegro
- Genres: Rock and roll; beat music
- Occupations: Singer, guitarist
- Instruments: Vocals, guitar, keyboards
- Years active: 1958–2005

Milan "Mile" Lojpur (Serbian Cyrillic: Милан-Миле Лојпур, 4 March 1930 – 29 July 2005) was a Serbian and Yugoslav rock musician. Starting his career in late 1950s, Lojpur is notable as one of the first rock and roll musicians in Socialist Federal Republic of Yugoslavia and one of the pioneers of the Yugoslav rock scene. Although he did not make any recordings during his career (with the exception of two guest appearances in 1988 and 1996), he had great influence on subsequent development of popular music in Serbia and Yugoslavia.

== Biography ==
=== Early life ===
Lojpur was born in Veliki Bečkerek, Kingdom of Yugoslavia in 1930. He showed interest in music at an early age. At the age of seven, he got a tamburica as a present from his mother, who later also bought him his first acoustic guitar. He got his first guitar lessons from an elderly neighbor. He attended Kikinda gymnasium, playing piano, saxophone and drums in the school orchestra.

=== Musical career ===
In 1958, Lojpur started performing in Belgrade with Sekstet M (trans. Sextet M), led by trumpeter Mile Nedeljković, which were one of the first performers of the so-called "električna muzika" ("electrical music", an expression the Yugoslav media used in 1950s and 1960s for rock music). They initially performed in Texas club in Cetinjska Street, and in Obilićev Venac student diner, popularly known among Belgrade students as "Tri kostura" ("The Three Skeletons'"). In 1959, the group changed their name to Septet M (Septet M), performing under that name until 1965. Septet M rose to fame on the dances organized at Red Star basketball courts at Kalemegdan Fortress, and on their summer performances in city of Rovinj, situated on the Adriatic coast. Their Belgrade performances, entitled Zvezdane noći (Starry Nights), consisted of covers of international rock and roll hits. Working as a secretary in Avala Film studios in Košutnjak, Lojpur had the opportunity to watch films featuring Elvis Presley before they were shown in Yugoslav cinemas, modeling his stage appearance and performances after Presley's. Lopjpur became famous for his spectacular appearance and microphone attached to his guitar. His song "Šumadijski twist" ("Šumadija Twist"), a cover of "Blue Suede Shoes", gained significant local popularity. At the time, he got his nickname "Mile Najlon" ("Mile Nylon") as being one of the first young people in Belgrade who wore nylon shirts. On 4 March 1960, Lojpur performed at a concert in Kolarac Concert Hall, the Yugoslav press announcing him as "Belgrade's Elvis Presley".

In mid-1960s, with the appearance of Yugoslav beat and rhythm & blues bands, his popularity declined, and he started to perform regularly in Belgrade kafana London. After spending six months performing in Finland, he returned to Yugoslavia, where he performed in Mažestik hotel's bar until the mid-1980s. In 1975, he appeared as himself in Srđan Karanović's TV series The Unpicked Strawberries, which revived the spirit of Belgrade from the late 1950s. In the mid-1980s, Lojpur switched to keyboards and started performing as a one-man band. In 1988, he made a guest appearance on Nikola Čuturilo's first solo album 9 lakih komada (9 Easy Pieces) in the song "Kad je Lojpur svirao" ("When Lojpur Used to Play"), and in 1996 he made a guest appearance on Prljavi inspektor Blaža i Kljunovi album Plagijati i obrade (Plagiarisms and Covers) in the cover of his old hit "Šumadijski twist".

=== Death ===
Lojpur actively performed until 2005, when, on 29 July, he died of heart attack.
