= Zlatni Dečaci =

Yugoslav rock band

Background information
- Also known as: The Tigers, Golden Boys
- Origin: Belgrade, SR Serbia, SFR Yugoslavia
- Genres: Instrumental rock; beat music; rock
- Years active: 1962-1967
- Labels: Fontana Records, Jugoton
- Spinoffs: Tomi Sovilj i Njegove Siluete, Korni Grupa
- Past members: Boba Stefanović; Velibor Kacl; Predrag Lukić; Dušan Banović; Vidoje Brajović; Gradimir Janković; Moma Davidović

Zlatni Dečaci (Serbian Cyrillic: Златни дечаци, trans. The Golden Boys) were a Yugoslav rock band formed in Belgrade in 1962. The band were one of the pioneers of the Yugoslav rock scene.

At the beginning of their career the band performed covers of foreign hits and instrumental versions of classical pieces. With their instrumental tracks they gained attention of a Dutch record label, releasing their debut record in the Netherlands, thus becoming the first Yugoslav rock band to release a record for the foreign market. In Yugoslavia the band enjoyed large mainstream popularity, being one of the most popular Yugoslav bands of the 1960s. The band's frontman Slobodan "Boba" Stefanović left Zlatni Dečaci in 1967, the group disbanding soon after. After his departure from the band, Stefanović would start a successful career as a pop singer and composer.

== History ==
=== 1962-1967 ===
The band was formed in 1962 by high school friends Slobodan "Boba" Stefanović (vocals), Velibor "Borko" Kacl (guitar), Predrag Lukić (organ), Dušan Banović (drums) and Vidoje "Vili" Brajović (bass guitar). All the forming members went to the same class in Belgrade's 14th Gymnasium. Initially the band was named The Tigers, because they, as they stated in an interview, "wanted a scary name which would be easily remembered and which would frighten the competition". They decided to change their name after the suggestion by national chess champion and radio personality Nikola Karaklajić, who did much to promote rock music in Yugoslavia. When Karaklajić made a visit to their school, they were introduced to him by their principal Stanijka Radošević, who described them to Karaklajić as "zlatni dečaci" (literally "golden boys", also an expression meaning "good kids"). After Karaklajić suggestion, they adopted this as the band's new name. Initially the band held rehearsals in their school's gym. They had their first live appearance after only two months of rehearsals, on a celebration in their school.

Soon after, in February 1963, the band got an invitation to perform on Sunday dances in Belgrade club Euridika. The band rehearsed in the club. The members of Saša Radojčić's jazz trio also held their rehearsals in the club, and would occasionally give some lessons and advice to the members of Zlatni Dečaci. On the dances held at Euridika, Stefanović performed both with Zlatni Dečaci and with Saša Radojčić's jazz trio. Initially Zlatni Dečaci performed in yellow shirts with a "ZD" emblem, and later got black and gold suites, while Banović played a set of gold-colored drums. Vocalists Moma Davidović and Tomi Sovilj performed with the band occasionally, but after some time Stefanović remained the band's only vocalist. The band gained large popularity, so, in 1964, they played as a backing band for singer Miki Jevremović on his highly successful EP 18 žutih ruža (18 Yellow Roses). They started to perform regularly in Gradski podrum club, and in 1964 they performed, alongside Safiri, Iskre, Lutalice and Ivanka Pavlović & Valjevski Dečaci on Parada ritma (Parade of Rhythm), the first rock festival held in Yugoslavia and arguably the first rock festival in a communist country.

Zlatni Dečaci wanted to break through to Yugoslav radio stations, which were at the time reserved towards beat music, so they started recording beat covers of classical music pieces. Karaklajić took those recordings to the Netherlands, where he participated in a chess tournament, managing to persuade local radio stations to broadcast them. This got the editors of Dutch label Fontana Records interested in the band. For Fontana Records the band, under the name Golden Boys, released the single "Swan Lake" (a version of a theme from Pyotr Ilyich Tchaikovsky's opera Swan Lake) and "Humoresque" (a version of a humoresque by Antonín Dvořák), thus becoming the first Yugoslav rock band to release a record for the foreign market. A year later, in 1966, those two recordings, alongside versions of a theme from Charles Gounod's opera Faust and Ion Ivanovici's waltz "Waves of the Danube", were released by Yugoslav record label Jugoton on the EP Humoreska (Humoresque). With these compositions the band gained nationwide popularity and soon started performing across Yugoslavia. However, a part of the public criticized the fact that uneducated musicians performed and recorded classical music. On the other hand, a part of Yugoslav rock musicians in interviews accused Zlatni Dečaci of pandering to broad audience with their covers of classical pieces. This did not affect the band's popularity; they held sold-out concerts in Euridika club, appeared on Yugoslav television on numerous occasions and recorded over 20 tunes for Radio Belgrade.

In April 1966, thanks to Karaklajić, Zlatni Dečaci performed in Great Britain, where Karaklajić participated in a chess tournament. In order to acquire visas for Zlatni Dečaci more easily, he presented the band members as young chess players. In Great Britain the band held several performances. They performed in Bognor Regis in front of some 1,500 people. They performed covers of rock hits, but their cover of Macedonian folk song "Jovano Jovanke" saw greatest success with the audience. Upon returning home, the band released their second EP. It featured the songs "Čudna devojka" ("Strange Girl", a cover of Marty Robbins' song "Devil Woman"), "Sadko" (a theme from Nikolai Rimsky-Korsakov's opera Sadko), "Napušteni dom" ("Deserted Home", a cover of The Four Pennies song "A Place Where No One Goes"), and "Foxtrot Oriental". The single was sold in more than 100,000 copies. During this year the band also appeared in the TV show Koncert za ludi mladi svet (Concert for Crazy Young People), performing an instrumental version of Gioachino Rossini's William Tell Overture. In a video recorded for the show, the members of the band played while riding horses. Later that year Brajović left the band, and was replaced by Gradimir Janković.

In 1967, the band released their third and the final EP with the songs "Sam" ("Alone", a cover of Bobby Vinton song "Mr. Lonely"), "Samo ti" ("Only You", a cover of The Who song "It's Not True"), "Pamtim taj dan" ("I Remember the Day", a cover of the song "Skokiaan" written by August Msarurgwa), and "Ne želim kraj" ("I Don't Want the End to Come", a cover of The Zombies song "Kind of Girl"). In 1967 the band also played as the backing band for the singer Zlatko Golubović on his EP Op hop and recorded the songs "Ti, samo ti" ("You, Only You") and "Jovano Jovanke" for Vladan Slijepčević's film Where to After the Rain?. The songs from the film were released by Jugoton on a flexi disc entitled Muzika iz filma Kuda posle kiše (Music from the Film Where to After the Rain?).

At the time of these releases, the group was going through a crisis. The band members themselves admitted in interviews that their studies distanced them from each other, and a part of youth press wrote that the band lost contact with younger audience. Soon after he appeared on the Belgrade Spring festival without the band, Stefanović left Zlatni Dečaci. Lukić left the band soon after. Kacl, Banović and Janković continued to perform with the vocalist Moma Davidović for a while, but soon ended their activity.

=== Post breakup ===
Stefanović started a successful career as a pop music singer and composer, recording five studio albums 29 EPs and 7" singles, winning numerous awards at Yugoslav and international pop music festivals. He graduated at the Belgrade Faculty of Dramatic Arts. He wrote the book Prva ljubav Dušana Silnog (First Love of Dušan the Mighty), which he illustrated with his own paintings, which was released with the music Stefanović composed as the soundtrack to the story. In 2015 he died in Belgrade, at the age of 69.

In 1968 Kacl joined the newly formed band Korni Grupa. After leaving Korni Grupa, he retired from music. He died in a car accident in 1984. Banović would for a while perform with the band Džentlmeni.

Moma Davidović moved to France, where he recorded several 7" singles under the names David Colsberry and David Loris.

Brajović moved to the United States. He self-released a CD with all the recordings made by Zlatni Dečaci in a limited number of copies. He wrote the book Album sa sličicama iz mog života (Album with Pictures from My Life), originally published in Washington, D.C. (1985), and later in Belgrade (2000).

== Discography ==
=== EPs ===
- Labuđe jezero (1966)
- Čudna devojka (1966)
- Sadko (1967)

=== Singles ===
- "Swan Lake" / "Humoresque" (1965)
- Muzika iz filma Kuda posle kiše (1967)
