= Bolje ti =

Studio album by Bjesovi
- Released: April 13, 2009
- Recorded: August 2005; Češnjak Studio, Kragujevac
- Genre: Alternative rock
- Length: 34:28
- Labels: PGP RTS; CD 417870; DVD 417870
- Producer: Momir Cvetković

Bjesovi chronology
Na živo (2002)	Bolje ti (2009)

Professional ratings
Review scores
Source	Rating
Mikrofonija	(favorable) link
Popboks	link

Bolje ti is the fourth studio album by the Serbian rock band Bjesovi, released in 2009.

== The album ==
=== Track listing ===
1. "Ako te neko zna" (2:47) (Zoran Marinković, Zoran Niketić, Dragan Arsić)
2. "Besan pas" (2:06) (Zoran Marinković)
3. "Kad se ruke moje vezane razdvoje" (3:56) (Zoran Marinković, Dragan Arsić)
4. "Istina" (3:18) (Zoran Marinković)
5. "Ko te vide taj se seća" (4:11) (Zoran Marinković, Goran Ugarčina)
6. "Izdaja" (3:56) (Zoran Marinković, Dragan Arsić)
7. "Hvala što postojiš" (3:49) (Zoran Marinković, Goran Ugarčina, Dragan Arsić)
8. "Laku noć" (5:10) (Zoran Marinković, Dragan Arsić)
9. "Bolje ti" (4:40) (Zoran Marinković)

== The DVD ==
=== Track listing ===
Scripted, directed and edited by Zoran Marinković, except for "Ako te neko zna" which was directed and edited by Marinković and Goran Ugarčina.

1. "Ako te neko zna"
2. "Besan pas"
3. "Kad se ruke moje vezane razdvoje"
4. "Istina"
5. "Bolje ti (version 2)"
6. "Ko te vide taj se seća"
7. "Izdaja" (3:56)
8. "Hvala što postojiš"
9. "Laku noć"
10. "Bolje ti (version 1)"

== Personnel ==
- Marko Marković (bass)
- Miroslav Marjanović (drums)
- Dragan Arsić (guitar)
- Slobodan Vuković (guitar)
- Zoran Marinković (vocals)
