= Na živo =

Live album by Bjesovi
- Released: 2002
- Recorded: March 22, 2002; Gornji Milanovac
- Genre: Alternative rock
- Length: 42:37
- Labels: Metropolis Records; MCD 049
- Producers: Zoran Đuroski, Dragoljub Marković, Ivan Brusić

Bjesovi chronology
| Sve što vidim i sve što znam (1997) | Na živo (2002) | Bolje ti (2009) |

Na živo is a live album by the Serbian rock band Bjesovi, released in 2002.

== Track listing ==
All written by Goran Marić and Zoran Marinković, except where noted.

1. "U osvit zadnjeg dana" (3:33)
2. "Vraćam se dole" (2:39)
3. "Vreme je" (4:59)
4. "Ime" (4:32)
5. "Ne budi me (ubij me)" (4:58)
6. "Raduj se" (2:40) (Goran Ugarčina, Goran Marić, Zoran Marinković)
7. "Sve će se doznati" (3:14) (Goran Ugarčina, Goran Marić, Zoran Marinković)
8. "Čak i da mogu" (5:25)
9. "Čekam dan" (3:31)
10. "Kiša" (7:05) (Slobodan Vuković, Vlastimir Matović, Zoran Marinković)

== Personnel ==
- Dragan Arsić (bass)
- Miroslav Marjanović (drums, backing vocals)
- Slobodan Vuković (guitar)
- Zoran Filipović (guitar)
- Zoran Marinković (vocals)
- Aleksandar Petrović Alek (percussion on track 10)
- Dejan Utvar (percussion on track 10)
