= Bjesovi (album) =

Studio album by Bjesovi
- Released: 1994
- Recorded: July – August 1993; Akademija Studio
- Genre: Alternative rock, grunge, hard rock, doom metal, psychedelic rock
- Length: 43:22
- Label: ITMM
- Producer: Aleksandar Radosavljević, Goran Živković

Bjesovi chronology
U osvit zadnjeg dana (1991)	Bjesovi (1994)	Sve što vidim i sve što znam (1997)

Alternative cover
- The 2001 reissue cover

Professional ratings
Review scores
Source	Rating
Ritam	5/5 stars

Bjesovi is the second album of the Serbian rock band Bjesovi released in 1994.

== Track listing ==
All tracks written by Goran Marić and Zoran Marinković, except where noted.

1. "Vraćam se dole" – 2:45
2. "Ime – 4:50
3. "Gavran" – 6:57
4. "Vreme je" – 4:57
5. "U osvit zadnjeg dana" – 3:38
6. "Ona te... voli" – 7:35
7. "Ne budi me (ubij me)" – 5:07
8. "Avioni pevaju" – 7:17

== Personnel ==
- Dejan Petrović – bass
- Miroslav Marjanović – drums
- Predrag Dabić – guitar
- Zoran Filipović – guitar
- Goran Marić – vocals
- Zoran Marinković – vocals
- Vidan Papić – harmonica on track 8
- Vladimir Lešić – percussion on track 8
