= Bjesovi =

Serbian alternative rock band

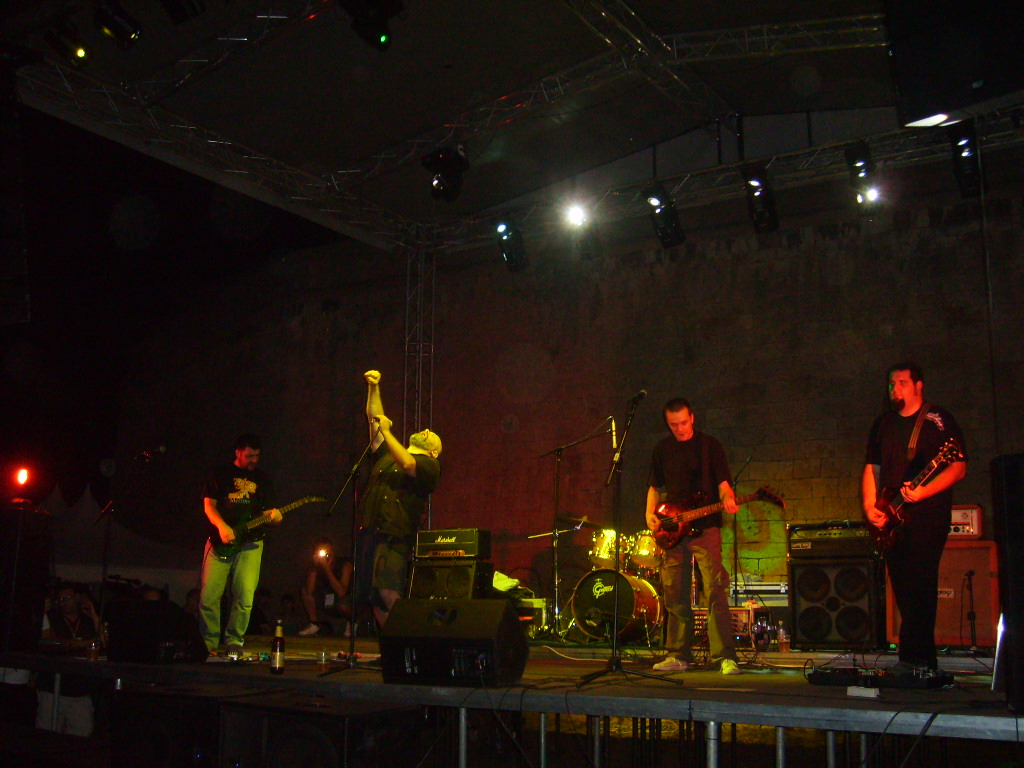
- Bjesovi performing at the 2009 Nisomnia festival in Niš

Background information
- Origin: Gornji Milanovac, Serbia
- Genres: Alternative rock; grunge; hard rock; doom metal; neo-psychedelia
- Years active: 1989-1997; 2000-2023, 2024-
- Labels: Sound Galaxy, ITV Melomarket, Metropolis Records, One Records, PGP-RTS
- Members: Zoran Marinković; Miroslav Marjanović; Marko Marković; Slobodan Vuković; Ivan Kovačević; Ramon Hamel
- Past members: Goran Marić; Predrag Dabić; Goran Filipović; Božidar Tanasković; Goran Ugarčina; Dejan Petrović; Igor Malešević; Vladimir Krstić; Dragan Arsić; Zoran Filipović
- Website: bjesovi.rs

Bjesovi (Serbian Cyrillic: Бјесови; trans. The Demons) are a Serbian alternative rock band formed in Gornji Milanovac in 1989. The band was one of the most notable acts of the 1990s Serbian rock scene.

Formed in 1989 by vocalists and songwriters Zoran Marinković and Goran Marić under the name Baader-Meinhof, the band started working under the name Bjesovi in 1990 and released their debut album U osvit zadnjeg dana in 1991. In 1994 the band released critically highly acclaimed untitled album, featuring heavy sound and dark introspective lyrics. After the album Sve što vidim i sve što znam, released in 1997 and dealing with religious themes, the band ended their activity. In 2000 Marinković reformed the band. Their 2009 album Bolje ti brought them larger attention by the mainstream audience, but the band maintained their artistic orientation with the 2015 cover album Svetla svetlosti. The group disbanded for the second time in 2023, solely to regroup in 2024.

== Biography ==
=== Formation, rise to prominence and breakup (1989–1997) ===
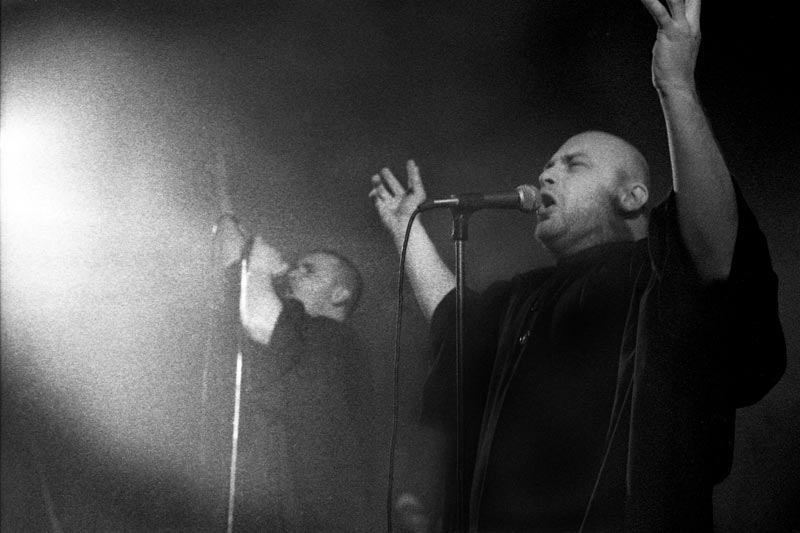
Forming members of Bjesovi Goran Marić (left) and Zoran Marinković (right) at a Bjesovi concert in Belgrade Youth Center in 1995

The band's history began in the mid-eighties, when two seventeen-year-olds, Zoran Marinković "Marinko" and Goran Marić "Max", started writing for the famous Yugoslav music magazine Džuboks under the pseudonyms McCrywack and Max Radackow. At the same time, they began making some home demo recordings which led to the decision to form a band. The band was formed in 1989 under the name Baader-Meinhof. After changing the name to Saint Gallen and later to China Blue, the band got the name Bjesovi (which is the title of Croatian language translation of Dostoyevsky's novel Demons). Marić and Marinković, both vocalists and songwriters, were backed by Predrag Dabić and Goran Filipović on guitars, Božidar Tanasković on bass guitar and Goran Ugarčina on drums.

In October 1990 the band recorded their debut album U osvit zadnjeg dana (At The Last Day's Dawn), released on cassette only in 1991. Guest appearances featured Vladimir Vesović and Nikola Slavković on guitars and Dejan Marinković, who provided narration on the track "On je sam" ("He Is Alone"). The album featured the song "Džordžija" ("Georgia"), with lyrics from Philippe Soupault's poem "Georgia" to which Zoran Marinković wrote the music, as well as the cover version of the Yugoslav beat band Tomi Sovilj i Njegove Siluete track "Vule Bule", which itself was a cover of Sam the Sham and the Pharaohs' "Wooly Bully". On the track "Zli dusi" (the title of Serbian language translation of Dostoyevsky's Demons), the lyrics included lines from the Gospel of Luke and Alexander Pushkin's poetry. The album attracted attention of the audience and the press with its dark music and lyrics.

The year 1991 brought a new lineup, since Ugarčina and Tanasković left the band and were replaced by Dejan Petrović on bass guitar and Miroslav Marjanović on drums. The band won first places on the 1993 Gitarijada Festival and the 1994 Brzi Bendovi Srbije (Fast Bands of Serbia) festival, which eventually led to a recording of a new album. The untitled album, also known simply as Bjesovi, was produced by Goran Živković and Aleksandar Radosavljević. Heavily influenced by grunge, the album showed the band in a new style, with heavy sound, dark ambient and pessimistic lyrics with mystic and macabre motifs. Two tracks from the album, "Vreme je" ("It Is Time") and "Ime" ("Name"), the latter including a quotation from the novel Dune by Frank Herbert, were included on a various artists compilation New Rock Power '93 - '94. The album was met with praises by the music critics.

The band's third studio album, Sve što vidim i sve što znam (All I See and All I Know), was released in 1997. The lineup which recorded the album included a new drummer, Igor Malešević from the band Hazari, and the original bassist Božidar Tanasković. Unlike the previous record, Sve što vidim i sve što znam featured more optimistic ambient, with religious topics and songs dealing with end of socialism. The track "Sve će se doznati" ("All Will Be Revealed") included the theme from James Bond combined with quotations from the New Testament. The album was produced by band themselves and Ivan Kljajić, and Dragoljub Marković (keyboards), Vladimir Mikić (double bass), Goran Đorđević (percussion) and Svetlana Spajić (vocals) appeared on the album as guests. Soon after the release of the album, the band ceased to exist.

With the foundation of the Christian radio Svetigora (Holy Mountain) in 1998, Marić started hosting the show Deca apokalipse – deca otkrovenja (Children of Apocalypse – Children of Revelation), featuring appearances by numerous rock acts. In 1999 Marić took part in the Christian rock various artists project Pesme iznad istoka i zapada (Songs Above East and West), which consisted of tracks recorded on lyrics written by Nikolaj Velimirović.

=== Reformation, new works and second breakup (2000–2023) ===
In spring of 2000 Marinković, accompanied by two old members, Zoran Filipović (guitar on all three albums) and Miroslav Marjanović (drummer on the second album), and two new members, Slobodan Vuković (guitar) and Dragan Arsić (bass guitar) reformed the band.

On 22 March 2002 the band recorded their concert in Gornji Milanovac. During the summer the recordings were remixed and post-produced. Aleksandar Petrović "Alek" and Dejan Utvar, both percussionists from the band Eyesburn, made guest appearances on the recordings. The live album Na živo (Live) featured live versions of the songs from the band's second and third album, alongside three new songs: "Čekam dan" ("I Am Waiting For The Day"), "Čak i da mogu" ("Even If I Could") and "Kiša" ("Rain"). The track "Raduj se" ("Be Happy") featured lyrics "Vreme mu ističe, zato besan je" ("His time is out, that is why he is mad"), which were not included on the original studio version since they were alluding to the former president of FR Yugoslavia Slobodan Milošević. The album was produced by Zoran Đuroski "Đura" from the band Eyesburn and the cover was designed by Marinković and the band's original drummer Goran Ugarčina.

On 31 May 2003 at Belgrade's Engineering Students' Club (KST) the band, consisting of Marinković, Marjanović, Vuković, Arsić, who played guitar, and Marko Marković on bass guitar recorded a concert and released it as an official DivX Live at KST, Belgrade 31.05.2003. The band made a thousand copies given to the fans, reporters and TV stations. A text file on the disc stated that the recording was a present to all fans and that the copying of the disc is allowed and preferable. The DivX contains songs from all four albums plus all lyrics, band biography and interviews. The band's performance featured girls painted in black, psychedelic effects and Marinković taken to the stage in a coffin at the beginning of the concert. The track "Avioni pevaju" ("Aeroplanes Sing") was sung by Goran Marić who made a guest appearance.

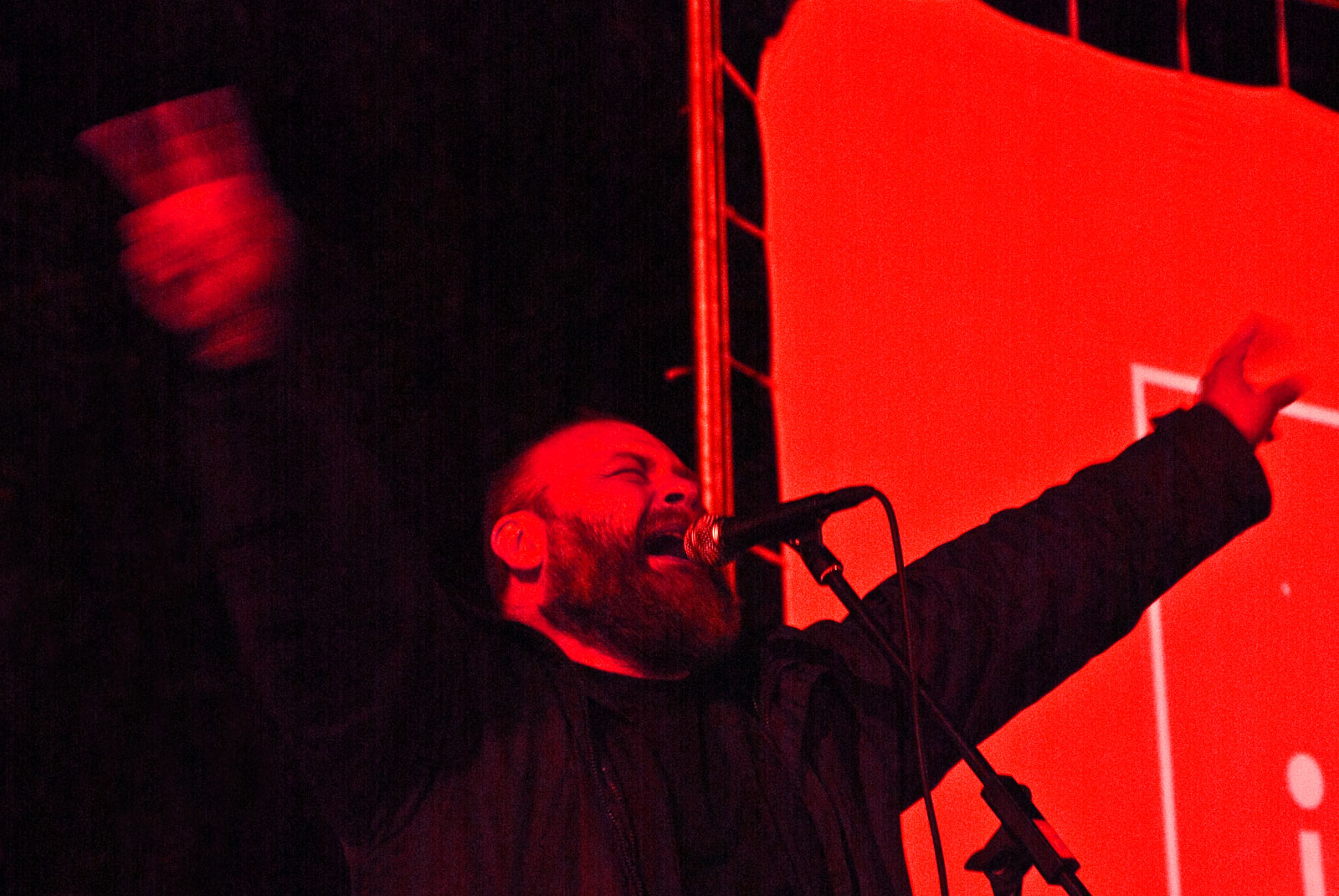
Zoran Marinković on Bjesovi 2008 concert in Gornji Milanovac

In 2006 Zoran Filipović, who played guitar on the first three albums, returned to the band as the bass player. During the year the band recorded the album Bolje ti (You Better). The album, although not officially released, was promoted on radio stations and the band recorded videos for all tracks on the album, with the first video presented to the audience being the one for "Laku noć" ("Good Night"). On 3 July 2007 the band performed as an opening act for Type O Negative in Belgrade's Students' Cultural Centre. In December 2008 the band signed a contract with the PGP-RTS record label and Bolje ti was officially released in April 2009. It was released in a DVD package, featuring the album itself and a DVD featuring promotional videos recorded for all the album tracks, plus an alternate version of the album title track. The following year, Multimedia Records released a various artists compilation Groovanje devedesete uživo (Grooving Nineties Live) featuring a live recording of "Ne budi me (Ubij me)" ("Don't Wake Me Up (Kill Me)") recorded at the band performance at the KST on 4 November 1995.

At the beginning of 2011, the band was joined by the guitarist Ivan Kovačević "Kovač", a member of the band Plišani Mališan (Little Plush Boy). In 2013, the band was joined by the second drummer, Ramon Hamel, a Gornji Milanovac-based Dutch. On the band's performances Marjanović performed old songs with the band, while Hamel played the ones that would appear on the band's upcoming cover album.

In February 2015 the band released the cover album Svetla svetlosti (Lights of Light), available for free download on the web magazine Nocturne website. The band released the album in the lineup featuring Zoran Marinković (vocals), Slobodan Vuković (guitar), Ivan Kovačević (guitar), Dragan Arsić (guitar) and Marko Marković (bass guitar). Three drummers participated in the recording: Miroslav Marjanović, Ramon Hamel, and Eyesburn member Aleksandar "Alek" Petrović. The album was recorded from October 2010 to July 2013 in Kragujevac and Mostar and was produced by Momir Cvetanović and edited by former Saints member Caspar Wijnberg. The album featured guest appearances by keyboardists Vasil Hadžimanov and Đorđe Tomić. It featured covers of songs by Ekatarina Velika, Angel's Breath, Idoli, Asim Sarvan, Električni Orgazam, The Stone, Mizar, Borghesia, Tako, Grč and several other less known acts. During the recording process, a cover of Braća Left song "Aikido" and a medley comprising Bajaga i Instruktori song "Godine prolaze" ("Years Are Passing") and Riblja Čorba song "Užasno mi nedostaje" ("I Miss Her so Much") were recorded. The two songs did not end up on the album, but were released as singles.

In April 2016 the band released the single "Probudi se" ("Wake Up"), originally recorded for Bolje ti, but unreleased on the album as the band believed it did not fit into the album concept. A month later the band released another song originally recorded for Bolje ti, "Šta to bi?" ("What Was That?"), and in October of the same year they released the song "Skoro 100%" ("Almost 100%"), also recorded during Bolje ti sessions, featuring lyrics originally written in 1984 by Marinković and Goran Marić. In 2018 Metropolis Records released the remastered edition of Sve što vidim i sve što znam. 2021 Svetla svetlosti was released on CD by the Novi Sad Students' Cultural Centre.

In September 2023 Marinković announced Bjesovi's second disbandment, stating the circumstances resembling the ones in 1997 are the reason for the end of the band's activity.

== Legacy ==
In 2021 the album Bjesovi was polled 2nd, the album Sve što vidim i sve što znam was polled 28th and the album Bolje ti was polled 50th on the list of 100 Best Serbian Albums Since the Breakup of SFR Yugoslavia. The list was published in the book Kako (ni)je propao rokenrol u Srbiji (How Rock 'n' Roll in Serbia (Didn't) Came to an End).

The lyrics of the songs "Ime" and "Vraćam se dole" ("I'm Going Back Down There") were featured in Petar Janjatović's book Pesme bratstva, detinjstva & potomstva: Antologija ex YU rok poezije 1967 - 2007 (Songs of Brotherhood, Childhood & Offspring: Anthology of Ex YU Rock Poetry 1967–2007).

== Discography ==
=== Studio albums ===
- U osvit zadnjeg dana (1991)
- Bjesovi (1994)
- Sve što vidim i sve što znam (1997)
- Bolje ti (2009)
- Svetla svetlosti (2015)

=== Live albums ===
- Na živo (2002)

=== Singles ===
- "Vreme je" / "Ime" (1994)
- "Dar" (2002)
- "Kad mi stane dah" (2002)

=== Video albums ===
- Live at KST, Belgrade 31.05.2003 (official DiVX, 2003)
- Bolje ti (album bonus DVD, 2009)

=== Other appearances ===
"Ne budi me (Ubij me)" (Groovanje devedesete uživo, 2009)
