= Direktori =

Serbian musical group

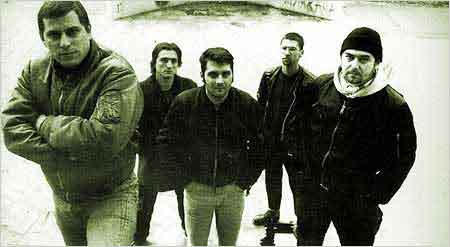
- Direktori in 1995

Background information
- Origin: Belgrade, Serbia
- Genres: Punk rock, oi!, ska
- Years active: 1989 – present
- Labels: Carlo Records, Take It Or Leave It, Feliks, LVO Records, MODS 69
- Members: Nebojša Drakula; Srđan Marić; Miroslav Pilipović; Dragan Rašković
- Past members: Predrag Tošović

Direktori (Serbian Cyrillic: Директори; trans. The Executives) is a Serbian oi! punk/ska group from Belgrade.

== History ==
=== 1989 – 1999 ===
During the spring of 1989, vocalist Nebojša Drakula, with the former Varšavski Geto member Miroslav Pilipović "Trta" on guitar, former Pogrebni Zavod member Srđan Marić on bass guitar and former Hogari member Dragan "Rale" Rašković on drums, formed a band performing cover versions of oi! punk acts such as Sham 69, Cockney Rejects and Skrewdriver. However, it was a year after, in November 1990, that the band got the name Direktori and included another guitar player, Predrag Tošović "Peđa". At the time the band recorded their first demo recording, the song "Mrzim Hajduk" ("I Hate Hajduk"), and in May 1991, they recorded "Čistićete ulice" ("You'll Be Cleaning the Streets") and "Njoj" ("To Her"). By the end of May, the band had their first public appearance in Novi Sad. Soon after the performance, the band recorded "Bando crvena" ("You Red Mob"), which was recorded during the Students protest on March 9, 1991, "Ide voz" ("The Train Goes") and "Porno film" ("Porn Movie").

In February 1992, the band recorded their first promotional video for the song "Bando crvena" for the Afirmator TV show. During the same year, on April, they entered the finals of the Palilula Culture Olympics (POK) and in June the band performed at the students protest and on the Vidovdan gathering. At the time, Deca Loših Muzičara brass section started performing with the band, giving an opportunity to the band to develop their interest in ska music. The politically explicit titles of the band's songs caused the band to be disqualified off the 1992 Zaječar Gitarijada, even though they had entered the finals and were critically well acclaimed by both the jury and the audience. The band also had problems with the media as the Bulevar newspaper magazine released some anti-band texts with titles such as "Direktori smoke marijuana" or "Marijuana and anti-communism", but the fact only helped the band's popularity.

In October 1992, the band, in only twelve hours, recorded seven new songs which, beside the previous demo recordings, were released on the debut album Čistićete ulice (You'll Be Cleaning the Streets). In November, the band entered the finals of the Brzi Bendovi Srbije (Fast Bands of Serbia) festival and won the best musical video award of 1992. Due to a misunderstanding with the Carlo record label, which released the debut first album, the band moved to Take It Or Leave It Records, and even though having new material ready for recording in mid-1993, it was in March 1994 that the band started recording the second album. Lesli se vraća krući (Leslie Returns Stiffer, a play on words for Serbian translation for 'Lassie Come Home' title) was released in March 1995 and the vinyl edition appeared a year later. The album featured eighteen new songs, including the cover of Vatreni Poljubac song "Doktor za rokenrol" ("Doctor For Rock and Roll"). Guest appearances featured the Deca Loših Muzičara brass section, Plejboj member Dušan Petrović on saxophone, Ekatarina Velika keyboardist Margita Stefanović, former Logika Otkrića guitarist Goran Živković and Zion i Baga Baga percussionist Leša. At the time, German ska/reggae record label Pork Pie included the band's song "Skinhedi skankuju" ("Skinheads Skanking") on the various artists compilation United Colors Of Ska Vol. 2 featuring young ska acts from all over the world.

In May 1995, the band performed at the Belgrade Dom Omladine with most of the musicians involved with the album recording. In the meantime, they decided to leave Take It Or Leave It and move to LVO Records which rereleased the band's second album. In January 1996, the band recorded a new version of "Ide voz" for Red Star football chant compilation. The band also worked on the soundtrack and appeared in the movie Geto (Ghetto), performing the song "Životinjska farma" ("Animal Farm"). On October 25 of the following year, the band performed at the Belgrade's KST when Serbian bands performed cover versions of punk rock classics. The song "Old McDonald", performed at the concert, appeared on the various artists compilation Punk You All. The band also appeared on the various artists compilation Svi protiv svih (Everybody Against Everyone), released for the Paket Aranžman TV show 10th anniversary, with the tracks "Skinhedi skankuju", "Roboti od krvi i mesa" ("Blood and Flesh Robots") and "Mi volimo pivo" ("We Love Beer").

During the late 1999, the band independently rereleased the first two albums, previously available on MC and LP, on CD and released a new album, Evo vam ga (Here's It To You). The album did not feature Tošović on guitar due to his departure to Portugal and was produced by former Svarog and Overdose member Zoran Đuroski "Đura", who also recorded guitars and performed live with the band. Guest appearances featured Block Out guitarist Nikola Vranjković, Željko Markuš and the band's youth role-model Milić Vukašinović (Vatreni Poljubac leader) who did vocals on the track "Smor grad" ("Boredom Town"). The song "Naš brat" ("Our Brother") was written by Zoran Kostić "Cane" from Partibrejkers, the song "Jedite govna" ("Eat Shit") featured the theme from Cock Sparrer track "Chip On Your Shoulder", and the track "Dobro nam doš'o, direktore naš" ("A Welcome To You Executive of Ours") featured the Georges Bizet's "Habanera" from the opera Carmen and the lines from the TV show Servisna stanica (Service Station) by Radivoje Lukić "Lola".

=== 2006 – present ===
In 2006, after a long hiatus, the band released their fourth album UA direktori (BOO The Executives). In the meantime, bassist Srđan Marić started playing with the band Antifriz, with whom he recorded the album Strašno važno (Really Important) in 2005.

== Discography ==
=== Studio albums ===
Title	Released
Čistićete ulice	1994
Lesli se vraća krući	1994
Evo vam ga	1999
UA direktori	2006

=== Singles ===
Title	Released
"Skinhedi skankuju"	1995
"Old McDonald"	1996
"Skinhedi skankuju" / "Roboti od krvi i mesa" / "Mi volimo pivo"	1996
"Mi volimo pivo"	2000

== See also ==
Punk rock in Yugoslavia
