= Obojeni Program discography =

- Studio albums: 8
- Live albums: 1
- Compilation albums: 2
- Singles: 2
- Video albums: 1
- Other appearances: 6

The discography of the Serbian indie/alternative rock band Obojeni Program (Serbian Cyrillic: Обојени програм; trans. Colored Program), consists of eight studio albums, two compilation albums, one live album and two singles.

== Studio albums ==
| Year | Album details |
|---|---|
| 1990 | Najvažnije je biti zdrav: Released: 1990; Label: Search & Enjoy; Format: LP, CS |
| 1991 | Ovaj zid stoji krivo: Released: 1991; Label: Tom Tom Music; Format: LP, CS |
| 1994 | Verujem ti jer smo isti: Released: 1994; Label: Metropolis; Format: CS, CD |
| 1996 | Ili 5 minuta ispred tebe: Released: 1996; Label: Tarkus, PGP RTS; Format: LP, CD |
| 1999 | Sva sreća general voli decu: Released: 1999; Label: B92; Format: CS, CD |
| 2001 | Ako nisam dobra šta ćemo onda?: Released: 2001; Label: UrbaNS; Format: CD |
| 2005 | Da li je to čovek ili je mašina: Released: 2005; Label: UrbaNS; Format: CD |
| 2011 | Kako to misliš: mi: Released: 2011; Label: Exit Music; Format: digital download, CD |

== Live albums ==
| Year | Album details |
|---|---|
| 1991 | Prijatelju kočnice ti ne rade baš sve: Released: 1992; Label: Sorabia Disk; Format: CS |

== Compilation albums ==
| Year | Album details |
|---|---|
| 1993 | Obojeni program: Released: 1993; Label: Music YUser; Format: CD |
| 2009 | Kosmos u tvom srcu / Igračke se voze levom rukom: Released: 2009; Label: Exit Music, Hello Bing; Format: LP, digital download |

== Singles ==
| Year | Album details |
|---|---|
| 2005 | "Let's Go": Bonus material: The documentary about making the album Da li je to čovek ili je mašina; Released: 2005; Label: UrbaNS; Format: CD |
| 2009 | "Ja hoću te": B-side: 982; Released: 2009; Label: Hello Bing; Format: 7" |

== Other appearances ==
| Title | | Released |
|---|---|---|
| "Kad bi malo (7x) mozak stao" | Omladina '89 | 1989 |
| "981" | Nema ljubavi bez patnje i bola (Leto '92 u bašti KST-a) | 1996 |
| "Nebo nebo plavo je" | Radio Utopia (B92: 1989-1994) | 1994 |
| "Kočnice" | Ustani i kreni | 1997 |
| "Dragon" | Ovo je zemlja za nas?!? Radio Boom 93 (1992-1997) | 1997 |
| "Reforma u vašoj glavi" | Metropolis Vol.2 | 2002 |
