= Grrr! 2004 =

Live album by La Strada
- Released: December 21, 2011
- Recorded: October 2, 2004
- Genre: alternative rock, indie pop, neo-psychedelia, acoustic rock
- Length: 33:59
- Label: PMK Records; PMK018

La Strada chronology
Hokej klub Virginitas (1988)	Grrr! 2004 (2011)

Grrr! 2004 is a live official bootleg album by the Serbian alternative rock/indie pop band La Strada, recorded at the Pančevo 2004 Grrr! festival acoustic performance by the band's former vocalist Slobodan Tišma. The album was released by the independent record label PMK Records in a limited number of 150 copies.

Professional ratings
Review scores
Source	Rating
Time Machine Music	8.5/10 stars

== Track listing ==
No.	Title	Length
1.	"Intro"	4:03
2.	"Mlad i radostan" (Young and Joyful)	5:18
3.	"Mama Luna" (Mother Luna)	5:15
4.	"Došla su tako neka vremena" (Such Times Have Come)	4:57
5.	"Okean" (The Ocean)	4:19
6.	"Usamljeni vozač" (Lonesome Driver)	4:08
7.	"Dr. Draga"	5:57

== Personnel ==
- Slobodana Tišma — acoustic guitar, vocals
- Aleksandar Zograf — album cover design
