= Luna (1980s Serbian band) =

Serbian and former Yugoslav band

- Luna, from left to right: Zoran Bulatović, Ivan Fece, Jasmina Mitrušić and Slobodan Tišma

Background information
- Origin: Novi Sad, Serbia, Yugoslavia
- Genres: New wave, post-punk, gothic rock, dark wave, minimal music
- Years active: 1981 – 1984 (reunions: 1992, 2004, 2017)
- Labels: Helidon, Fatalamanga Records
- Past members: Zoran Bulatović; Slobodan Tišma; Ivan Fece; Jasmina Mitrušić; Marinko Vukmanović; Robert Radić; Zoran Lekić

Luna (Serbian Cyrillic: Луна; trans. The Moon) was a Serbian and former Yugoslav post-punk/gothic rock band from Novi Sad.

Formed on the ashes of the new wave band La Strada and named after the Bernardo Bertolucci film La Luna, Luna quickly gained the public's attention and established a cult status. Owing to Marko Brecelj, a former Buldožer member, who had approached them after a performance in Rijeka, Zoran Bulatović "Bale" (guitar), Slobodan Tišma (vocals), Ivan Fece "Firchie" (drums) and Jasmina Mitrušić "Mina" (keyboards, vocals) got the opportunity to release their debut album. However, their debut and only album Nestvarne stvari (Unreal Things) was released after the band disbanded. The album was critically well acclaimed and is considered one of the finest releases of the former Yugoslav rock scene. Twenty years after the album release, in 2004, the band reunited for a one-off performance at the Novi Sad Exit festival.

== History ==
=== Formation, rise to prominence ===
During the mid-1981, following a dispute between the band members of the band La Strada and the departure of the bassist Boris Oslovčan "Bora" and guitarist Predrag Ostojić, the band, at the time featuring Slobodan Tišma (guitar, vocals) and Ivan Fece "Firchie" (drums), was joined by the former Pekinška Patka member Zoran Bulatović "Bale" as the new bassist. At the time, the band was preparing for a three-date mini tour, including Novi Sad, Pančevo and Belgrade, organized by the Muzička Omladina concert agency, with the bands Lačni Franz, Čista Proza and Fotomodeli. Despite being well accepted at the performances, the band ceased to exist.

During the late 1981, Zoran Bulatović "Bale" (guitar), Slobodan Tišma (vocals) and Ivan Fece "Firchie" (drums) joined by the former Pekinška Patka member Marinko Vukmanović (bass) formed Luna, choosing the name by the Bernardo Bertolucci film La Luna. Since the band members were already well-known, the formation of the band caused great interest in the public. The band started writing new material, with Bulatović being responsible for the music writing and arrangement, while Tišma was the band's lyricist. A few days before the band's first public appearance, Vukmanović had left the band, forming his own pop group Primavera, and was replaced by Jasmina Mitrušić "Mina" (keyboards, vocals).

The lineup had their first live appearance in March 1982 in the Vienna club Arena at the Novosadski Novi Talas festival (Novi Sad new wave music festival). After the festival, Luna started performing at numerous Novi Sad and Belgrade venues, establishing itself a cult status and receiving positive reactions from the critics. The journalist Petar Luković in the April 1982 edition of the Duga magazine stated that "Luna is today probably the most mature Novi Sad band from this generation: their music is a strange symbiosis of avant-garde influences of the alternative music scene and a luster of pop philosophy, backed with a steady rhythm and striking vocals". Yet another critic, Dragan Kremer, in the December 1982 edition of the Omladinske novine stated that "Luna is the best band we have. Next year either belongs to them, or to nobody else".

In the meantime, in the Radio Novi Sad studios, the band recorded their first demo, featuring the song "Ogledalo lune" ("The Mirror of Luna"), which become a local hit and was often broadcast on the Studio B radio station. The demo, along with the La Strada two track demo, a live recording of the song "Metropolis" recorded at the Ben Akiba theatre June 27, 1983, and an entire March 11 performance at the KCM Sonja Marinković surfaced during the late 1980s on the bootleg album Hokej klub Virginitas (Hockey Club Virginitas) by Ding Dong records on compact cassette only. During the autumn of 1983, the band went on a tour of Croatia, performing in Zagreb and Rijeka, and Slovenia, performing in Ljubljana and Kopar. After the Rijeka performance, the band was approached by a former Buldožer member Marko Brecelj, who later took the demo recordings to his former bandmate Boris Bele, one of the head of the Helidon record label.

=== Debut album recording, breakup ===
Having returned from the tour, the band entered the Aquarius Studio in Belgrade, where, with the help of sound engineer Đorđe Petrović and producer Saša Habić. As Bulatović later stated in an interview, the band had entered the studio well-rehearsed, with the track-sheets written out and a clearly worked out strategy of the music recording process. The album recording was finished by September 1983 and, at the time, due to a quarrel between Bulatović and Tišma, the latter was expelled from the band. Jasmina Mitrušić followed Tišma and the two went on to reforming La Strada during the following year. Bulatović went to serve the Yugoslav People's Army after which he joined Imperium of Jazz and Fece joined Katarina II.

The debut album Nestvarne stvari (Unreal Things), was released by Helidon during the spring of 1984 and due to the band disbandment and the fact that there would be no album promotion it was released in 920 copies only. The album was marked by the poetic vignettes like "Lambo", "Okean" ("The Ocean", featuring lead vocals by Mitrušić), "Amazon" ("Amazonia"), and "Ogledalo Lune" ("The Mirror of Luna") with a consistent minimalist form. On the album Tišma signed himself as Artur, the pseudonym he started using under the influence of the poetry of Arthur Rimbaud. After the album release, the Rock magazine voted Nestvarne stvari the seventh best album of the year 1984, the band also got the award Sedam Sektetara SKOJ-a in Zagreb, and the album was acclaimed by the critics as one of the best debut releases in former Yugoslavia.

=== Post-breakup, brief reformation ===
With the reformed La Strada, Tišma and Mitrušić released the album La strada in 1987, before disbanding in 1989. After La Strada disbanded, Tišma quit his musical career and released two poetry books, the first Marinizmi (Marinisms) in 1995, and Vrt kao to (Garden Like That) in 1997. A collection of his texts released in literary magazines during the late 1980s and early 1990s were published as Blues Diary - Pitoma religiozna razmišljanja (Blues Diary - Cultivated Religious Meditations) in 2001 and he published an autobiographical novel Urvidek in 2005. He also wrote a libretto for a multimedia pseudo-opera Kralj šume (King of the Forest) by Andraš Urban. In 2012, he won a NIN Award for his novel Bernardijeva soba (Bernardi's Room). Mitrušić finished the Musical Academy studies and moved to Italy. In 2001 she participated the Pesme iznad istoka i zapada (Songs Above the East and the West), featuring Serbian rock musicians performing music to the poems by Bishop Nikolaj Velimirović, with the written music and arrangement for the poem "Vladaj, Bože" ("Reign, God").

In 1992 Bulatović, accompanied by former La Strada and, at the time, Obojeni Program members Robert Radić "Robi" (drums) and Zoran Lekić "Leki" (bass guitar), shortly reformed Luna, but the band dissolved soon after due to his moving to New York City. The material recorded during the short period was released fourteen years later as Bulatović's solo album Summer Without Syphilis and it featured Bulatović on lead vocals and guitar. In New York, with the former Igra Staklenih Perli bassist Draško Nikodijević "Dracula", he recorded the album ...And The Gods Made Wars as White Rabbit Cult, released in 1999, featuring sampled material related to the NATO bombing of Yugoslavia. The following year, he remastered the album Nestvarne stvari, featuring an alternate album cover, and released it through his own independent record label Fatamalanga Records. In 2010, Bulatović and Vukomanović reunited with their former Pekinška Patka bandmates, releasing a comeback single and announcing the release of a cover album.

Fece joined Katarina II which soon after evolved into Ekatarina Velika, with whom he recorded their eponymous debut album, after which he went to serve the Yugoslav People's Army, after which he joined Laboratorija Zvuka. In 1988 he had also promptly rejoined Ekatarina Velika on the tour promoting the album Ljubav (Love), shortly replacing Srđan Todorović before moving away to New York City in April 1988. Shortly before leaving, he had patented a drum set with an alternative way of drum tuning. In New York, Bulatović, Nikodijević and former Električni Orgazam keyboard player Ljubomir Đukić and former Bezobrazno Zeleno member Vojislav Bešić "Beške" he formed a supergroup Collateral Damage, but the band did not release any material. The funds earned on the performances, the band used to buy medications which were sent to the Novi Sad Children's Hospital. In 2007 he released the album EKV Revisited featuring the rerecorded material of the Ekatarina Velika songs, featuring only the original vocal tracks.

=== One-off reunion ===
Twenty years after disbanding the default Luna lineup reunited on July 3, 2004, at the Novi Sad Exit festival main stage. The band performed the album Nestvarne stvari in its entirety as well three songs which did not appear on the album, "Metropolis" and "Muzika" ("Music"), demo versions of both songs being released on the semi-official compilation album Hokej klub Virginitas in 1988, and the unreleased song "Hulica". At the time, the band had also entered the Radio Novi Sad studio and recorded the three unreleased tracks, intending to be released with the live recording of the Exit performance, however, the recordings have remained unreleased.

== Legacy ==
The lyrics of 4 songs by the band were featured in Petar Janjatović's book Pesme bratstva, detinjstva & potomstva: Antologija ex YU rok poezije 1967 - 2007 (Songs of Brotherhood, Childhood & Offspring: Anthology of Ex YU Rock Poetry 1967 - 2007).

== Discography ==
=== Studio albums ===
- Nestvarne stvari (1984)

=== Compilation albums ===
- Hokej klub Virginitas (with La Strada; 1988)

=== Other appearances ===
- "Ogledalo Lune" (Made In Yugoslavia - Πράξη Πρώτη; 1992)
