= De Ropta, Metslawier =

Smock mill in Friesland, Netherlands

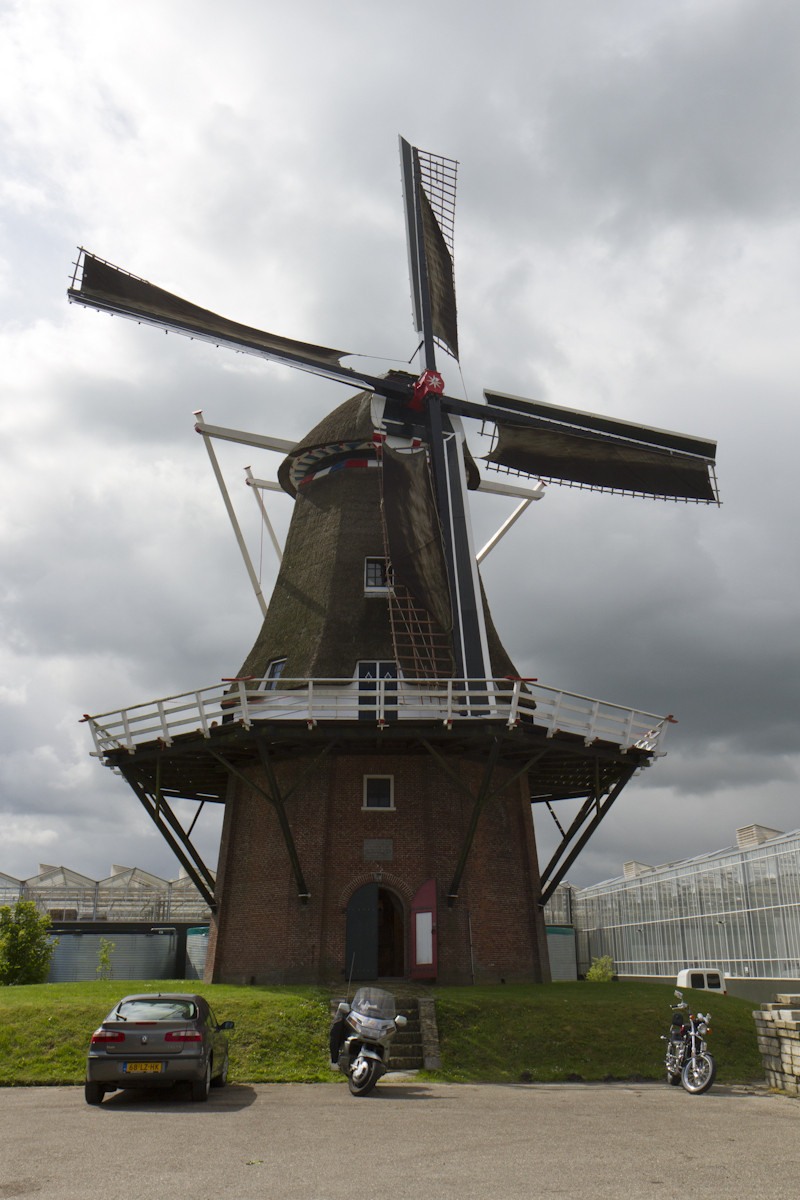
- De Ropta, June 2012

Origin
- Mill name: De Ropta
- Mill location: Roptaweg 2, 9123 JB Metslawier
- Coordinates: 53°22′09″N 6°04′13″E
- Operator(s): Stichting Monumentenbehoud Dongeradeel
- Year built: 1840

Information
- Purpose: Corn mill and pearl barley mill
- Type: Smock mill
- Storeys: Three storey smock
- Base storeys: Two storey base
- Smock sides: Eight sides
- No. of sails: Four sails
- Type of sails: Common sails
- Windshaft: Cast iron
- Winding: Tailpole and winch
- No. of pairs of millstones: Four pairs of millstones
- Size of millstones: Two pairs 1.70 metres (5 ft 7 in) diameter One pair 1.50 metres (4 ft 11 in) diameter One pair 1.40 metres (4 ft 7 in) diameter

De Ropta is a smock mill north of Metslawier, Friesland, Netherlands which was built in 1840 and is in working order. The mill is listed as a Rijksmonument.

== History ==
A mill was built by Romke van der Werf of Betterwird in 1836, but it was blown down in 1840. It was rebuilt on a 20 Dutch feet (approximately 6.22 metres (20 ft 5 in)) high brick base. The mill was struck by lightning in 1889, but no serious damage was caused. The mill ceased working commercially in 1961. It was sold to the municipality of Dongeradeel in 1962. It carried Patent sails until 1966, when they were replaced by Common sails. The mill was restored in 1966, 1971, and 1996. The mill is one of the most complete corn and pearl barley mills in Friesland. It is listed as a Rijksmonument, number 31577.

== Description ==
De Ropta is what the Dutch describe as a "stellingmolen". It is a smock mill on a two-storey base, there is a stage at second-floor level, 5.70 metres (18 ft 8 in) above ground level. The smock and cap are thatched. The mill is winded by tailpole and winch. The sails are Common sails. They have a span of 21.00 metres (68 ft 11 in). The stocks are of interest in that one pair is of rivetted construction, made by the Gorter shipyard of Hoogezand, Groningen. The other stock, of welded construction, is claimed to be the first made by the millwright Christiaan Bremer of Adorp, Groningen. The sails are carried on a cast-iron windshaft, which was cast in 1891 by De Prins van Oranje of The Hague, South Holland. The windshaft also carries the brake wheel, which has 61 cogs. This drives the wallower (32 cogs) at the top of the upright shaft. At the bottom of the upright shaft, the great spur wheel, which has 95 cogs. The great spur wheel drives two pairs of millstones via a lantern pinion stone nut which have 24 staves each. The millstones are 1.40 metres (4 ft 7 in) and 1.50 metres (4 ft 11 in) diameter, although one of the former is broken. The mill also drives two pairs of 1.70 metres (5 ft 7 in) diameter millstones which are used for milling pearl barley. These are driven by lantern pinion wallowers which have 20 staves each.

== Public access ==
De Ropta is open to the public by appointment.

== Interior ==
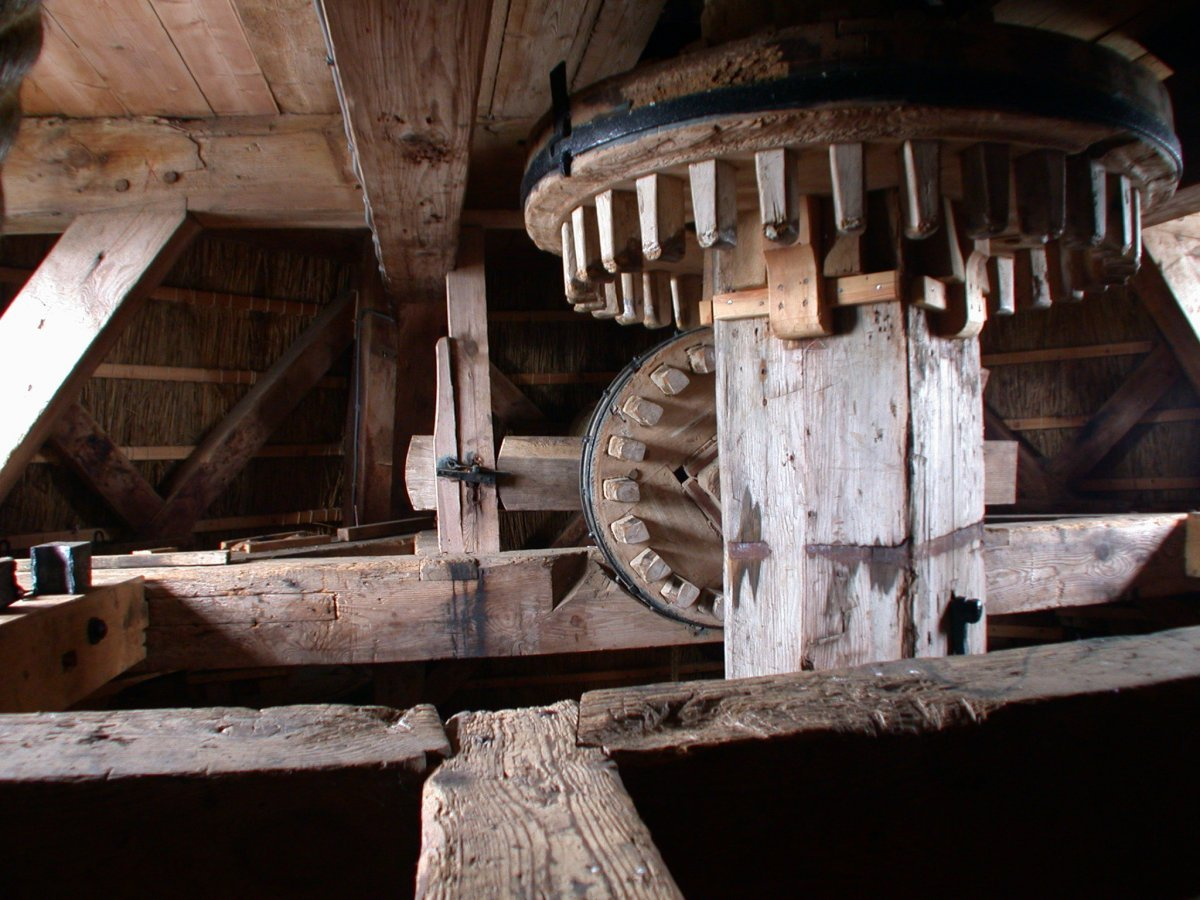

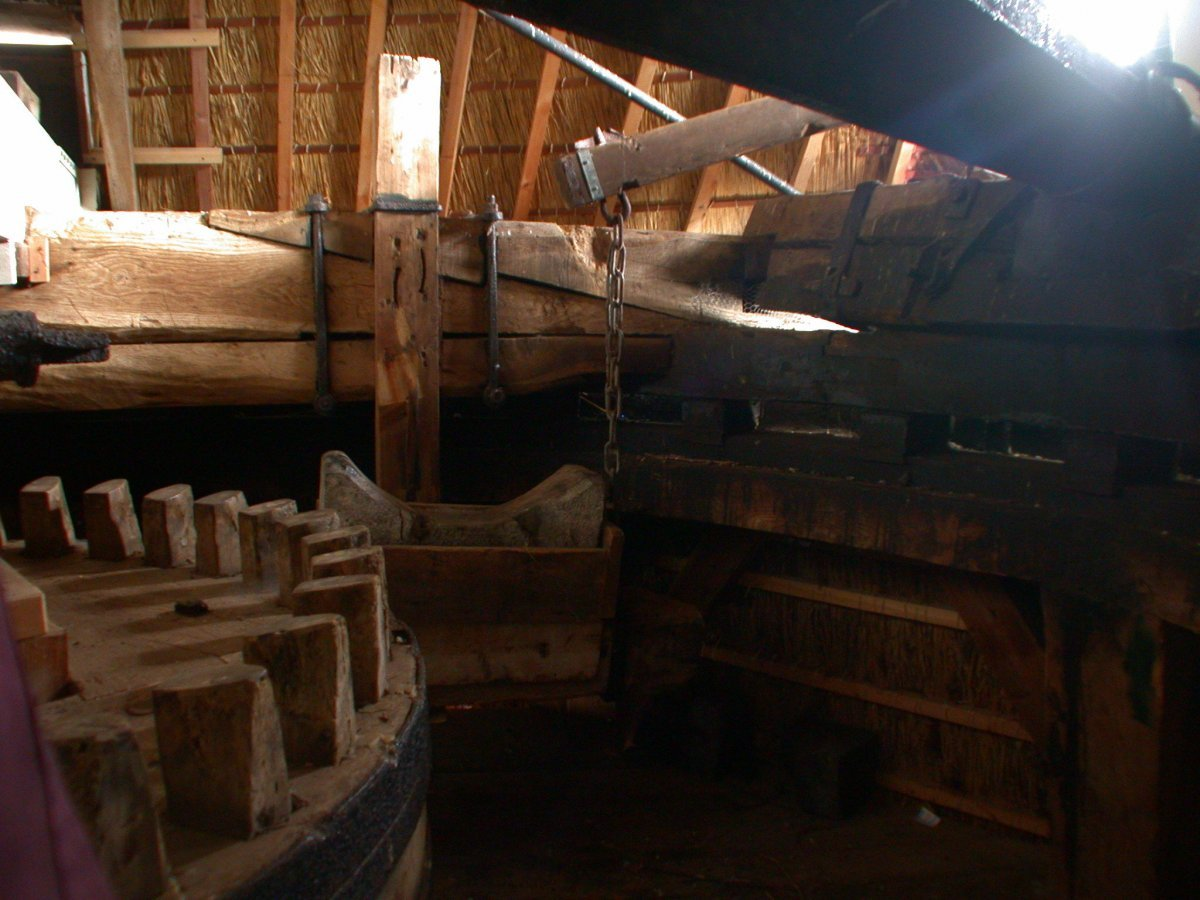

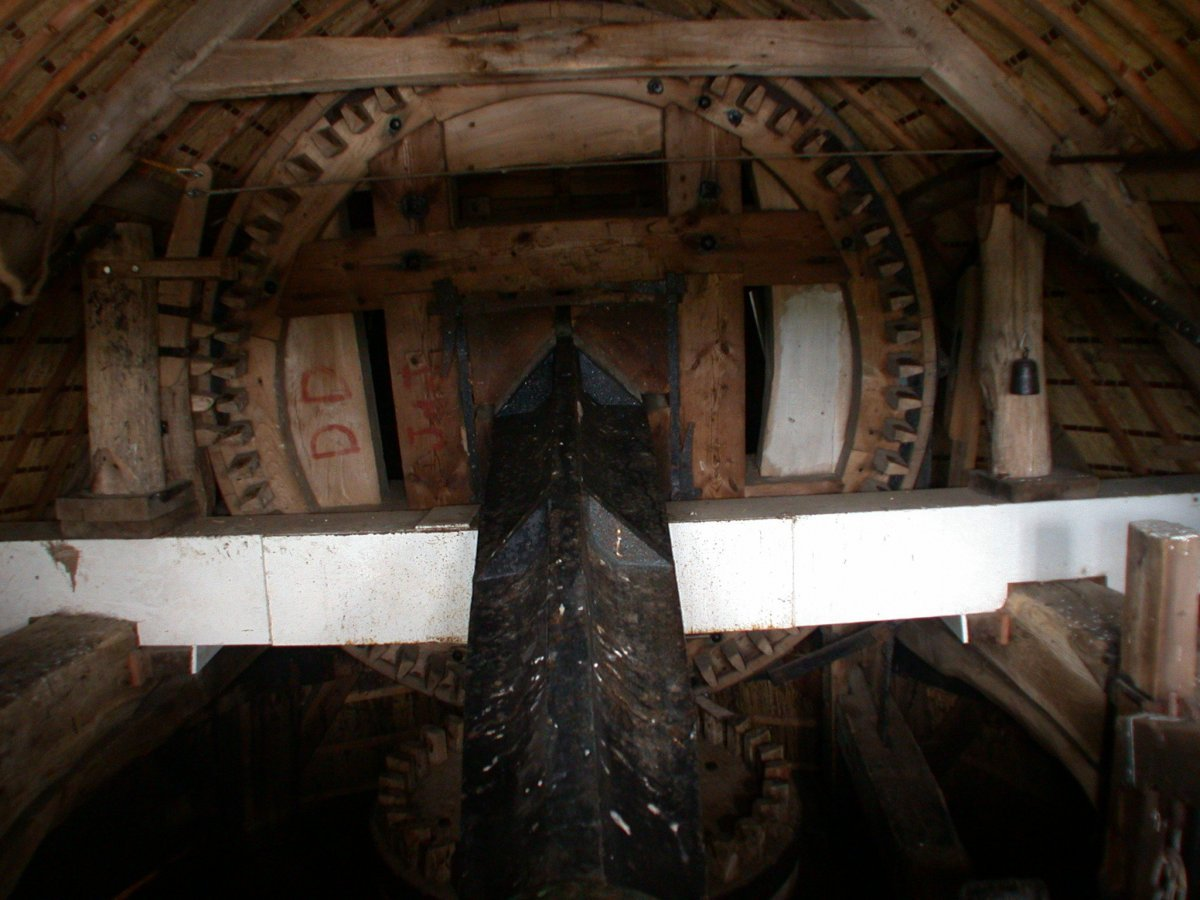
