= Prijatelju kočnice ti ne rade baš sve =

Obojeni program

Live album by Obojeni Program
- Released: 1992
- Recorded: 1 August 1992, KST, Belgrade
- Genre: Indie rock, alternative rock
- Length: 45:46
- Label: Sorabia Disk
- Producer: Obojeni Program, Miloš Grozdanović

Obojeni Program chronology
| Ovaj zid stoji krivo (1991) | Obojeni program (1992) | Obojeni program (1994) |

Prijatelju kočnice ti ne rade baš sve (My Friend Your Brakes are not Completely Working) is the debut live album by the Serbian indie/alternative rock band Obojeni Program released by the Serbian independent record label Sorabia Disk in 1993 on compact cassette only, and consists mostly of the live versions of the material from the first two studio albums, Najvažnije je biti zdrav and Ovaj zid stoji krivo released in 1990 and 1991.

== Track listing ==
All lyrics and music by Obojeni Program.

| No. | Title | Length |
|---|---|---|
| 1. | "Prijatelju kočnice ti ne rade baš sve" (My Friend Your Breaks are not Completely Working) |
| 2. | "Reči same govore" (Words Speak for Themselves) |
| 3. | "Čudan glas te poziva" (A Strange Voice is Calling You) |
| 4. | "Štipaljka" (Clothespin) |
| 5. | "Slobodan i nestvaran" (Free and Unreal) |
| 6. | "Ona je tu!" (She is Here!) |
| 7. | "U tvoj osmeh stane sve" (Everything Fits in Your Smile) |
| 8. | "Kad bi malo...sedam puta...mozak stao" (If Only... Seven Times... The Brain Would Stop A Little) |
| 9. | "Filadelfija" (Philadelphia) |
| 10. | "981" |
| 11. | "Poklanjam ti sebe" (I Give Myself to You) |
| 12. | "Kosmos u tvom srcu" |
| 13. | "Hladan kao sunce" (Cold as the Sun) |
| 14. | "Pozivamo tople reke" (We are Inviting Warm Rivers) |
| 16. | "Nebo, nebo plavo je" (The Sky, the Sky Blue Is) |

== Personnel ==
The band

- Branislav Babić "Kebra" — vocals
- Danica Milovanov "Daca" — vocals, backing vocals
- Dragan Knežević — guitar, backing vocals
- Jovan Pejić — drums

Additional personnel (Boye members)

- Ilija Vlaisavljević "Bebec" — bass guitar
- Biljana Babić — vocals, backing vocals
- Jelena Katjez — vocals, backing vocals
