= Da li je to čovek ili je mašina =

Studio album by Obojeni Program
- Released: 2005
- Recorded: May – June 2004, Sing Sing Studio, Metslawier, Netherlands and Alpha studio, Novi Sad
- Genre: Indie rock, alternative rock, electronic music, experimental music
- Length: 63:50
- Label: UrbaNS
- Producer: Ilija Vlaisavljević "Bebec"

Obojeni Program chronology
Ako nisam dobra šta ćemo onda? (2001)	Da li je to čovek ili je mašina (2005)	Kosmos u tvom srcu / Igračke se voze levom rukom (2009)

Professional ratings
Review scores
Source	Rating
Popboks	7/10 stars
Terapija	8/10 stars
Muzika.hr	3/5 stars
Plastelin	Favorable

Da li je to čovek ili je mašina (Is that a Human or a Machine?) is the seventh studio album by the Serbian indie/alternative rock band Obojeni Program released by the Serbian independent record label UrbaNS in 2005.

== Track listing ==
All music and lyrics by Obojeni Program.

No.	Title	Length
1.	"Let's Go"	2:40
2.	"Šole ili stroj" (Šole Or the Array)	4:20
3.	"All Okay"	4:46
4.	"Bebas" (Bebass)	4:10
5.	"Obećaj mi molim te" (Promise Me Please)	2:59
6.	"Silikon Color"	3:56
7.	"New Colours"	5:44
8.	"Gospodin Cinik" (Mister Cinical)	4:07
9.	"Mašina" (Machine)	4:04
10.	"Mix Max Tit"	5:35
11.	"Pod kontrolom" (Under Control)	3:46
12.	"Sve u redu" (All in Order)	2:57
13.	"Savršen" (Perfect)	2:57
14.	"Fabrike genoma" (Genom Factories)	3:25
15.	"Braunovo kretanje" (Brownian motion)	1:04
16.	"Mix Story"	7:11

== Personnel ==
The band

- Branislav Babić "Kebra" — vocals
- Tamara Dobler — vocals, backing vocals
- Dragan Knežević — guitar, backing vocals
- Mirko Topalski — drums
- Miloš Rašković — bass guitar
- Miloš Romić — DJ

Additional personnel

- Vladimir Cinocki "Cina" — design, photography
- Vlada Žeželj — recorded by
- Ilija Vlaisavljević "Bebec" — production
