= Boye (band) =

Serbian new wave/alternative rock band

- Boye in the mid-1980s

Background information
- Origin: Novi Sad, Serbia
- Genres: New wave; alternative rock; garage rock
- Years active: 1981–2000
- Labels: PGP-RTB, Search & Enjoy, Doranit Enterprises Ltd, B92
- Past members: Biljana Babić; Jasna Manjulov; Ljiljana Radaković; Klaudija Gavrilović; Vesna Branković; Milica Vezmar; Milica Žilnik; Vesna Milović; Darko Matić; Tanja Đajić; Ilija Vlaisavljević; Jelena Kajtez; Aleksandra Blažić; Vladimir Radusinović; Miloš Rašković; Đorđe Todorović; Robert Telčer

Boye (pronounced /bo.je/; a pun coming from feminine of boy and from boje, transl. colors) were a Serbian and Yugoslav rock band formed in Novi Sad in 1981. Until the late 1980s, Boye were an all-female band, but later lineups also featured male members, with drummer Biljana Babić being the only mainstay member during the band's career. Initially a part of the Yugoslav new wave scene, Boye later moved towards garage rock-influenced alternative rock. The band released four studio albums before disbanding in 2000.

== History ==
=== 1980s ===
The band was formed in October 1981 by Biljana Babić (drums), Jasna Manjulov (keyboards, vocals, lyrics author), Ljiljana Radaković (bass guitar) and Klaudija Gavrilović (guitar, vocals). The band had their first live appearance in December of the same year in the Novi Sad Medical School, presenting themselves as an energetic all-female new wave band.

In February 1982, they performed at Novosadski novi talas (Novi Sad New Wave) concert held in the Vienna club Arena, along with other Novi Sad new wave bands, Kontraritam, Ove Sezone Vedri Tonovi, Imperium of Jazz, Obojeni Program (fronted by Biljana Babić's brother Branislav Babić "Kebra"), Grad and Luna. During the year, they held a number of performances in Novi Sad and Belgrade clubs together with the bands Obojeni Program, Grad and Luna, attracting the attention of the Yugoslav music press. By the end of the year, Klaudija Gavrilović left the band, being replaced by Vesna Branković. In 1983, the band performed at the international rock festival Frauen in der Rock Music (Women in Rock Music) in Vienna, where they performed alongside The Raincoats and Au Pairs, and at Frauen Avantgarde (Avant-garde Women) festival in Linz, where they performed as the only rock band. At the time, Milica "Mica" Vezmar became the new lead vocalist, to be replaced by Milica "Maša" Žilnik after only several months.

The praise from the music press led to the band being offered a contract by the Zagreb-based record label Jugoton. In 1984, the band recorded the material for the debut album in Zagreb, but the recordings were never released. The recordings were produced in synth-pop manner, as the record label wanted to promote Boye as a synth-pop act, and the members of the band, dissatisfied with the recorded material, broke a contract with the label.

In 1985, the band made demo recordings with the Disciplina Kičme frontman Dušan Kojić "Koja" as the producer, presenting themselves with a more guitar-driven sound. During the year, the group made contacts with two other Yugoslav all-girl bands, pop rock band Cacadou Look from Rijeka and punk rock band Tožibabe from Ljubljana, organizing a joint concert at the Belgrade Youth Center. During the year, the band also performed at the Subotica Youth Festival. In mid-1986, Ljiljana Radaković left the band due to her pregnancy, and was replaced by Vesna Milović. The recorded demo tracks provided Boye with an opportunity to release the 7-inch single with the songs "Ja hoću te" ("I Want You"), and "Kralj dosade" ("King of Boredom") through Belgrade-based PGP RTB. The cover of the single was designed by Biljana Babić and featured the inscriptions "Prvi pravi ženski zvuk" ("The first true feminine sound") in Kojić's already familiar manner. For the recording of the single, Ljiljana Radaković made a brief return to the band, only to record bass lines, as the other members believed Vesna Milović did not fit in with the band's sound. The single would be the band's only release in an all-female lineup. After the release of the single, Boye's new bass guitarist became Darko Matić, the first male member of the band, and the group was joined by yet another singer, Tanja Milović.

The band's debut album, Dosta! Dosta! Dosta! (Enough! Enough! Enough!) was produced by Kojić and released by PGP-RTB in 1988. Under Kojić's influence, the band had maintained their original musical style and introduced rap vocal sections, and Kojić also played guitar on three tracks. The album featured the material written during the previous years, with the prominent songs "Mama Kivi" ("Mother Kiwi"), "Gde se možemo sresti" ("Where Could We Meet") and the title track. The cover was designed by Biljana Babić. Dosta! Dosta! Dosta! was met with positive reactions by the critics, and after its release the band went on their first solo tour across Yugoslavia. In 1989, the band was joined by new bass guitarist, Ilija Vlaisavljević "Bebec", formerly of the band La Strada, bringing new ideas and becoming a new leading figure of the band.

=== 1990s ===
In 1990, the band released their second studio album, 78, through the independent record label Search and Enjoy from Zagreb. The album producer was once again Kojić, who also appeared as the author of the tracks and a guest guitarist. The song "Ja sam radosna" ("I am Joyful"), present in the band repertoire since the beginning of their career, appeared on the album. The song lyrics were written by former La Strada leader Sloboan Tišma, with La Strada song "Mlad i radostan" ("Young and Joyful") sampled on the track.

The political circumstances in the country influenced the work within the group. The band had to end the 78 promotional tour after the outbreak of the Yugoslav Wars. With the outbreak of the wars, Tanja Đajić, Jasna Manjulov and Vesna Branković left the band, quitting their musical careers. Biljana Babić and Ilija Vlaisavljević continued to lead Boye featuring new members Jelena Kajtez (vocals) and Aleksandra Blažić "Caka" (vocals) and Vladimir Radusinović "Radule" (guitar), the member of the Novi Sad punk rock band Atheist Rap, who had left Boye after a short period of time. The new lineup appeared on the Ne računajte na nas (Do Not Count On Us) antiwar concert held at the Belgrade Republic Square during the spring of 1992.

The following year, the band recorded their third studio album, Boye se ne boje (Boye Are Not Afraid). The album was recorded in the Netherlands at the Sing Sing Studio owned by the former Čista Proza member Milan Ćirić. Boye se ne boje was the band's first album to feature Biljana Babić as lyricist. The album production was done by Vlaisavljević, who had also recorded the guitar sections, and as guests on the album appeared former Disciplina Kičme member Zoran Erkman "Zerkman" (trumpet) and David Gardeur (keyboards). With the help of the latter, the band recorded a promotional video for the track "Gleglegledaj!" ("L. L. Look!") which, along with the interview with the band, had been broadcast on Dutch national television. The album was released for the Western market by the Israel record label Doranit Enterprises Ltd, under the title Boye Aren't Afraid, and in Serbia it was released first by Music YUser and then by Metropolis Records. The album was met with positive reactions by the Serbian critics and got the award for the best release in 1993 by the Serbian magazine Ritam.

After Boye's return from the Netherlands, Aleksandra Blažić left the band, and Miloš Rašković (guitar) and Đorđe Todorović (trombone) became the new band members. During the early 1994, the band held three concerts in Athens. In 1995 they performed in Athens once again and at Crete as a part of the manifestation Za mir na Balkanu (For Peace on the Balkans). At the time, Robert Telčer became the new guitar player. The new lineup performed in March 1996 at the Balkans Art Festival in Komotini and Xanthi situated in Greece, near the Turkish border.

The fourth studio album, Prevariti naviku (To Trick a Habit), was released in July 1997, once again recorded at the Sing Sing Studio and produced by Vlaisavljević. The album featured the single "Ludilo mašina" ("Machine Madness"), presenting the band in a more modern musical direction than on the previous releases. During the same year, on the Slovenian live various artists compilation V živo v Štuki (Live in Štuk), the band appeared with the recording of their 1995 performance at the Maribor Štuk Hall, along with the performances of various bands from Slovenia and Croatia.

The band had their last performances during 2000. In the summer of 2000 they performed on the concerts organized by Radio B92, alongside Darkwood Dub, Obojeni Program and Voodoo Popeye. After Biljana Babić had a child, the band ended their activity.

=== Post breakup ===
After leaving Boye, Jasna Manjulov published two books of poetry, Različite pesme (Different Songs, 1988) and Lažno predstavljanje (Misrepresentation, 1996) and worked as a proofreader. Vlaisavljević, with the members of the band Obojeni Program, wrote and recorded music for Aleksandar Davić's 2004 film Party.

In 2023, the album Boye se ne boje was reissued on vinyl with two previously unreleased songs as bonus tracks, "Kuća i krik" ("The House and the Scream") and "Ti si taj" ("You're the One").

== Legacy ==
In 2009, the Serbian alternative rock band Obojeni Program covered the song "Ja hoću te" and released it on 7-inch single. During the same year, the Serbian indie rock band Autopark covered the song "Gde možemo se sresti" ("Where We Could Meet") on their album Sve dalje (Further On). In 2011, at the Belgrade Mikser Festival, Serbian alternative rock band Jarboli performed the album Dosta! Dosta! Dosta! in its entirety.

In 2015, Dosta! Dosta! Dosta! was polled No.71 on the list of 100 Greatest Yugoslav Albums published by the Croatian edition of Rolling Stone. In 2021, the album Prevariti naviku was polled 95th on the list of 100 Best Serbian Albums Since the Breakup of SFR Yugoslavia. The list was published in the book Kako (ni)je propao rokenrol u Srbiji (How Rock 'n' Roll in Serbia (Didn't) Came to an End).

In 2014, the cast of the Otvorena vrata TV series, covered the song "Dosta! Dosta! Dosta!", for the soundtrack for the episode "Idoli" ("Idols").

== Discography ==
=== Studio albums ===
- Dosta! Dosta! Dosta! (1988)
- 78 (1990)
- Boye se ne boje (1993)
- Prevariti naviku (1997)

=== Singles ===
- "Ja hoću te" / "Kralj dosade" (1987)
- "Fudbal" / "Fudbal (Mix bez reči)" (1990)

== See also ==
- New wave music in Yugoslavia
