= Pesme iznad istoka i zapada =

Compilation album by Various Artists
- Released: April 15, 2001
- Recorded: December 1999 – June 2000
- Studio: O Studio, Belgrade
- Genre: Christian rock; alternative rock; traditional music; garage punk; pop rock; electronic music
- Length: 74:12
- Label: PGP-RTS; Radio Svetigora
- Producer: Ivan Kljajić

Pesme iznad istoka i zapada (trans. Songs above East and West) is an album comprising the works of various artists, released in 2001, featuring thirteen songs recorded by Serbian rock musicians based on the poems of Bishop Nikolaj Velimirović (who has been canonized since the release of the album).

In 2021 Pesme iznad istoka i zapada was polled 69th on the list of 100 Best Serbian Albums Since the Breakup of SFR Yugoslavia. The list was published in the book Kako (ni)je propao rokenrol u Srbiji (How Rock 'n' Roll in Serbia (Didn't) Came to an End).

== Recording and release ==
The album features (at the time) current and former members of Bezobrazno Zeleno, Bjesovi, Galija, Darkwood Dub, Luna, La Strada, Partibrejkers, Plejboj, Hazari, Sunshine, Električni Orgazam, 357, Qrve, Džukele, Goblini, Night Shift, Ana Stanić's backing band, and other bands. The album also features Goran Trajkovski, member of Macedonian band Anastasia. Although the participation of former Idoli members Srđan Šaper and Nebojša Krstić was announced, the two did not participate in the album recording.

The album was edited by hieromonk Jovan Ćulibrk. The album was officially released on Easter, April 15, 2001, through PGP-RTS, in cooperation with Radio Svetigora, the radio of the Serbian Orthodox Church.

== Track listing ==
Pesme iznad istoka i zapada
No.	Title	Writer(s)	Performer	Length
1.	"Usliši nas, Bože naš"	Drago Senić	Goran Marić, Svetlana Spajić, Dragutin Aleksandrić, Bojan Vulin, Drago Senić, Miloš Velimir	3:43
2.	"Sve je tvoje, Bože"	Drago Senić	Drago Senić, Goran Marić, Dragutin Aleksandrić, Ivan Kljajić, Miloš Velimir	3:06
3.	"Sveta Tekla"	Zora Vitas	Zora Vitas, Marina Stojković, Predrag Stojković	3:25
4.	"Koga ću da hvalim?"	Zoran Kostić, Nebojša Antonijević	Zoran Kostić, Nebojša Antonijević, Marko Dacić, Leonid Pilipović, Miloš Velimir	4:04
5.	"Za ugašena ognjišta"	Aleksandar Gardašević, Boris Lješković	Aleksandar Gardašević, Boris Lješković, Veljko Vućurović, Svetlana Spajić, Olivera Kristić, Dragutin Jakovljević, Zoran Maksimović, Ognjen Popić, Goran Milošević	3:53
6.	"Gora visoka"	Drago Senić	Drago Senić, Svetlana Spajić, Dragutin Aleksandrić, Miloš Velimir	3:40
7.	"Istok s' visine"	Petar Toplaović, Milan Tica	Petar Topalović, Milan Tica, Goran Simić, Igor Kašiković, Dragan Ćurković, Draško Kremenović	6:19
8.	"Darovi Svetog Jovana Vladimira"	Svetlana Spajić, Drago Senić	Svetlana Spajić, Goran Marić, Drago Senić, Dragutin Aleksandrić, Miloš Velimir, Goran Milošević	4:26
9.	"Vladaj, Bože"	Jasmina Mitrušić	Jasmina Mitrušić, Julija Boroš, Svetlana Spajić, Manja Ristić	5:13
10.	"Molitva Blagom Hristu"	Darkwood Dub	Dejan Vučetić, Milorad Ristić, Vladimir Jerić	4:51
11.	"Znaš li ko te ljubi silno?"	357	Nikola Hadži-Nikolić, Miloš Velimir, Nebojša Čanković, Marko Dacić, Nebojša Potkonjak, Zoran Cvetković, Đorđe Petrović	5:25
12.	"Pesma Svetom Savi"	Drago Senić	Goran Marić, Drago Senić	3:59
13.	"Jovan ot Elbasan"	Goran Trajkovski	Svetlana Spajić	6:04

== Personnel ==
- Dragutin Aleksandrić (Qrve) - guitar
- Nebojša Antonijević (Partibrejkers) - guitar
- Julija Boroš - vocals
- Zoran Cvetković (357) - trumpet
- Nebojša Čanković (357) - guitar
- Dragan Ćurković (Revolt) - guitar
- Marko Dacić (357, Night Shift) - bass guitar
- Aleksandar Gardašević (DST) - vocals
- Nikola Hadži-Nikolić (357) - vocals
- Dragutin Jakovljević (Galija, Ana Stanić backing band) - guitar
- Vladimrir Jerić (Darkwood Dub) - guitar
- Igor Kašiković (Revolt) - bass guitar
- Ivan Kljajić (Bezobrazno Zeleno, Ana Stanić backing band) - guitar, producer, mixing
- Zoran Kostić (Partibrejkers) - vocals
- Draško Kremenović (Revolt) - vocals
- Olivera Kristić - backing vocals
- Boris Lješković (DST) - vocals
- Zoran Maksimović (Jazz Ba) - guitar
- Goran Marić (Bjesovi) - vocals, backing vocals
- Goran Milošević (Hazari) - percussion
- Goran Milošević (Plejboj, Ana Stanić backing band) - drums
- Jasmina Mitrušić (Luna, La Strada) - vocals
- Đorđe Petrović (DJ) - scratch
- Leonid Pilipović (Džukele, Goblini) - guitar
- Ognjen Popović (Jazz Ba, Ana Stanić backing band) - bass guitar
- Nebojša Potkonjak (357) - trumpet
- Manja Ristić - violin
- Milorad Ristić (Darkwood Dub) - guitar, bass guitar, backing vocals
- Drago Senić (Qrve) - vocals, bass guitar, backing vocals
- Goran Simić (Revolt) - drums
- Svetlana Spajić (Paganke, Moba, Drina) - vocals, backing vocals
- Marina Stojković - ison
- Predrag Stojković - kaval
- Milan Tica (Revolt) - guitar
- Petar Toplaović (Revolt) - vocals
- Goran Trajkovski (Anastasia) - producer (track #13)
- Miloš Velimir (Pussycat, Sunshine, Električni Orgazam, 357, Partibrejkers) - drums
- Zora Vitas - vocals
- Dejan Vučetić (Darkwood Dub) - vocals, programming
- Veljko Vućurović (DST) - backing vocals
- Bojan Vulin (Nesalomivi) - guitar

=== Additional personnel ===
- Oliver Jovanović - postproduction
- Marinko Lugonja - design
- Uroš Marković - assisting recording
- Goranka Matić - photography
- Bjanka Paunović - assisting recording

== Legacy ==
In 2021 Pesme iznad istoka i zapada was polled 69th on the list of 100 Best Serbian Albums Since the Breakup of SFR Yugoslavia. The list was published in the book Kako (ni)je propao rokenrol u Srbiji (How Rock 'n' Roll in Serbia (Didn't) Came to an End).
