= Obojeni program (album) =

Compilation album by Obojeni Program
- Released: 1993
- Recorded: 1989, Akademija studio, Belgrade; August–September 1991, Guru Sound studio
- Genre: Indie rock, alternative rock
- Length: 71:52
- Label: Music YUser
- Producer: Dušan Kojić "Koja"

Obojeni Program chronology
Prijatelju kočnice ti ne rade baš sve (1992)	Obojeni program (1993)	Verujem ti jer smo isti (1994)

Alternate cover
- The 2011 remastered edition cover

Obojeni program (Colored Program) is the debut compilation album by the Serbian indie/alternative rock band Obojeni Program released by the Serbian independent record label Music YUser in 1993, and consists of the material from the first two studio albums, Najvažnije je biti zdrav and Ovaj zid stoji krivo released in 1990 and 1991. The compilation was reissued in 1996 by Tarcus records and remastered and reissued in 2011 by Odličan Hrčak.

== Track listing ==
All lyrics and music by Obojeni Program.

No.	Title	Length
1.	"Štipaljka" (Clothespin)	3:26
2.	"To još nisam rekao" (I Still Haven't Said It)	2:18
3.	"U tvoj osmeh stane sve" (In Your Smile Everything Fits)	1:45
4.	"Kosmos u tvom srcu" (Cosmos In Your Heart)	3:24
5.	"O, da li?" (Oh, Is It?)	3:03
6.	"Ona je tu!" (She is Here!)	3:21
7.	"Filadelfija" (Philadelphia)	2:57
8.	"Reči same govore" (Words Speak for Themselves)	3:13
9.	"Hvala!" (Thanks!)	3:20
10.	"Uzmi me!" (Take Me!)	2:54
11.	"Kad bi malo...sedam puta...mozak stao" (If Only... Seven Times... The Brain Would Stop A Little)	3:07
12.	"Čudan glas te poziva" (A Strange Voice is Calling You)	3:40
13.	"981"	4:26
14.	"Umoran je ovaj dan" (This Day is Tired)	3:04
15.	"Poklanjam ti sebe" (I Give Myself to You)	4:29
16.	"Slobodan i nestvaran" (Free and Unreal)	3:06
17.	"Nebo, nebo plavo je" (The Sky, the Sky Blue Is)	4:50
18.	"Hladan kao sunce" (Cold as the Sun)	3:09
19.	"Krećem se u pravcu Raja" (I am Moving Towards Paradise)	3:13
20.	"Dejvi" (Davy)	3:59
21.	"Pozivamo tople reke" (We are Inviting Warm Rivers)	3:00
22.	"Nebo, nebo drugo je" (The Sky, the Sky Other Is)	3:08

== Notes ==
- Tracks 1–11 taken from Najvažnije je biti zdrav
- Tracks 12–21 taken from Ovaj zid stoji krivo
- Track 22 is a version of track 17 without the guitars and bass
