= Kosmos u tvom srcu / Igračke se voze levom rukom =

- Kosmos u tvom srcu cover

Compilation album by Obojeni Program
- Released: 29 June 2009
- Recorded: 2009, Sing Sing studio, Metslawier and Studio 150 Amsterdam, Netherlands
- Genre: Indie rock, alternative rock, electronic music, experimental music
- Length: 35:38 (LP); 64:11 (digital download)
- Label: Hello Bing (LP); Exit Music (digital download)
- Producer: Boris Mladenović

Obojeni Program chronology
Da li je to čovek ili je mašina (2005)	Kosmos u tvom srcu / Igračke se voze levom rukom (2009)	Kako to misliš: mi (2012)

Alternate cover
- Igračke se voze levom rukom cover

Professional ratings
Review scores
Source	Rating
Popboks	7/10 stars
Terapija	10/10 stars

Kosmos u tvom srcu / Igračke se voze levom rukom (Cosmos in Your Heart / Toys are Driven with the Left Hand) is the second compilation album by the Serbian indie/alternative rock band Obojeni Program released by the Serbian netlabel Exit Music for free digital download as well as the Dutch independent record label Hello Bing in 2009. The material released on the two releases consists of rerecorded versions of the previously released material. All the tracks had their titles changed on this release and some tracks are different versions on LP and digital audio. Single was released on vinyl as well (Ja hocu te / 982), track "Ja Hocu Te" is cover song (Boye) and "982" is new version of song "981", both tracks in this version exist only on this single. LP "Kosmos U Tvom Srcu" and Single "Ja Hocu Te / 982" were released in physical format on vinyl only, this was recorded all in the same session.

== Track listing ==
All lyrics and music by Obojeni Program.

=== Kosmos u tvom srcu ===
No.	Title	Length
1.	"Želim" (I Want)	3:40
2.	"Reči same govore" (Words Speak for Themselves)	2:52
3.	"Mozak..." (The Brain...)	3:31
4.	"Ja joj dajem sve" (I am Giving Her Everything)	2:30
5.	"Kosmos u tvom srcu" (Cosmos in Your Heart)	5:20
6.	"Čovek" (The Man)	4:07
7.	"Avioni" (Airplanes)	3:34
8.	"Svi" (Everybody)	3:21
9.	"Dejvi" (Davy)	3:27
10.	"Pop"	3:28

=== Igračke se voze levom rukom ===
No.	Title	Length
1.	"Plafu"	3:53
2.	"Mašina" (Machine)	4:08
3.	"Želim" (I Want)	3:39
4.	"Dragon"	2:04
5.	"Kočnice" (Breaks)	2:50
6.	"Dejvid" (David)	3:27
7.	"Reci" (Words)	2:53
8.	"Hitić" (A Tiny Hit)	3:00
9.	"Turbo"	2:30
10.	"H-1"	5:26
11.	"Obećaj" (Promise)	2:55
12.	"Pop"	3:28
13.	"Svi" (Everybody)	3:21
14.	"Avioni" (Airplanes)	3:33
15.	"Boye"	1:38
16.	"Mozak" (The Brain)	3:31
17.	"Dali" (Isit)	3:13
18.	"983"	3:27
19.	"Prijatelj" (Friend)	3:45
20.	"Go-Go"	2:46

== Personnel ==
The band

- Branislav Babić "Kebra" — vocals
- Ljubomir Pejić "Ljuba" — bass guitar, backing vocals
- Vladimir Cinkocki "Cina" — drums, backing vocals
- Dragan Knežević — guitar, backing vocals
- Miloš Romić — DJ

Additional personnel

- ShpiRa — effects, additional electronics
- Mile Ćirić — recorded by
- Boris Mladenović — producer
- Zlaya Hadzich — mastered by
