= Bilo jednom... =

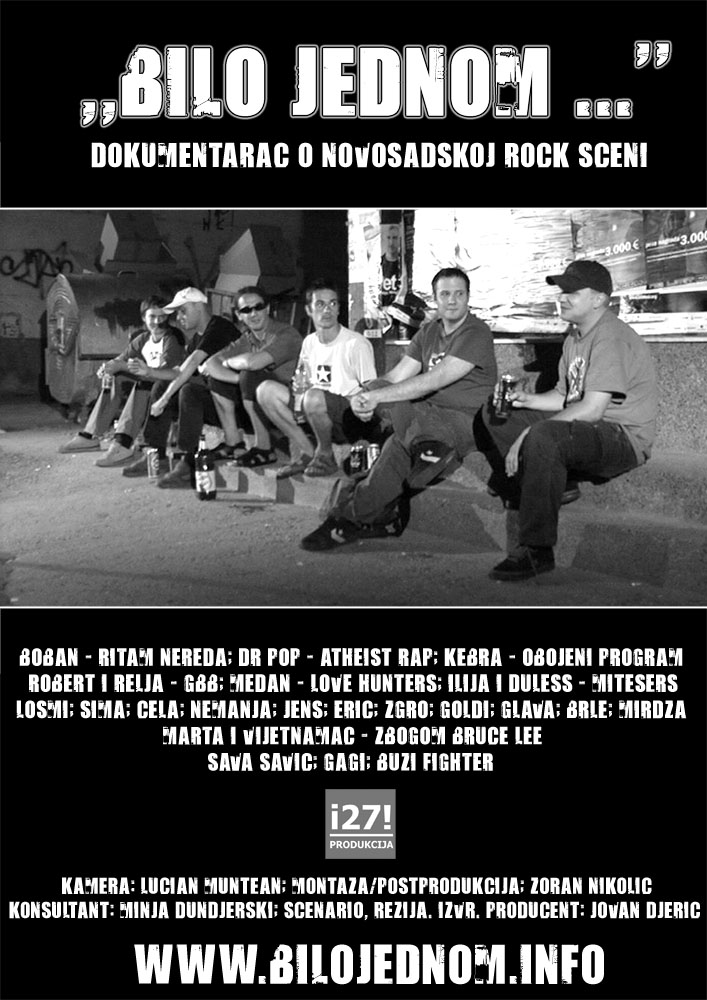
- Directed by: Jovan Đerić
- Written by: Jovan Đerić/ Minja Dunđerski
- Produced by: Jovan Đerić
- Starring: Dr. Pop, Boban, Kebra, Robert, Ilija
- Cinematography: Lučian Muntean
- Edited by: Zoran Nikolić
- Music by: Various bands
- Distributed by: Produkcija i27!
- Release date: October 27, 2006 (Serbia)
- Running time: 43 min.
- Language: Serbian

Bilo jednom... (English: Once Upon a Time) is a 2006 rockumentary by Serbian filmmaker Jovan Đerić. The film's premiere in a packed Arena cinema, was followed by live sets from punk-rock bands Mitesers and Generacija bez budućnosti. The film is about the punk-rock scene of Novi Sad, in the first half of the 1990s. People who made up this scene talk 15 years later about the rise and reasons for the fall in interest in this kind of music, widely popular in Serbia during the rule of the late Slobodan Milošević. As many of interviewees state, a common enemy—Milosevic and his regime—was a good focal point for the energy their music was making. When this enemy disappeared, the whole movement lost its edge and these days the story is very much low profile.

Film was part of "Made in Vojvodina" program of 2007 Motovun Film Festival (Motovun, Croatia), presenting cinematography of Vojvodina, and also as part of four-day event—"Enter UK"—about cultural influence of British sub-culture in Serbia, held in Novi Sad during the EXIT festival 2007. Bilo jednom... was part of the program of several festivals (Grossmann (Ljutomer, Slovenia), Filofest (Ljubljana, Slovenia), ), and had a theatrical screenings in Warsaw, Poland and Mostar, Bosnia and Herzegovina.

== Cast and crew ==
Most notable bands from the period are represented by their frontmen and/or other members, including Dr. Pop (Atheist Rap), Boban (Ritam nereda), Kebra (Obojeni Program), Robert and Relja (Generacija bez budućnosti - GBB), Vijetnamac and Marta (Zbogom Brus Li), Medan (Love Hunters), Ilija (Mitesers), Dules (Atheist Rap and Mitesers). The rest of the cast is made of people who took part in street-life during the 1990s (most of them former members of punk-rock bands)—Šima, Ćela, Nemanja, Lošmi, Jens, Erić, Goldi, Glava, Brle, Mirdža. Sava Savić and Zgro are authors of the book Novosadska punk verzija (English: Novi Sad Punk Version) that covers the Novi Sad Punk scene from its beginnings at the end of the 1970s (the book and Bilo jednom... are often wrongly perceived as part of the same project). Gagi is a character whose name is part of the title of a popular song from the period, and Buži acts as a guide through locations where gigs were happening and where youth hung out during the 1990s.

Authors used music videos by Generacija bez budućnosti, Obojeni Program, Ritam nereda, Atheist Rap, Zbogom Brus Li, Vrisak generacije, Boye, Love Hunters, DMT and Ska ringišpil.

The film was made with minimal crew—cinematographer Lučian Muntean and editor Zoran Nikolić were the only members besides director/producer, who also acted as boom operator.

== Background/Production ==
The idea for the film came to the author some months after he saw Sretno dijete, a musical documentary about trends in Yugoslavian urban sub-culture from the beginning of 80s. In December 2004 Đerić approached Minja Dunđerski, a prominent manager of rock acts and gig promoter, with the idea to make the film, and so the story starts. Dunđerski was credited as a co-writer, and also was a consultant and a contact for most of the people appearing in the film, as well as contributor of most of the archive materials. Filming started on July 3, 2006 on Belgrade promotion of book Novosadska punk verzija, continued during EXIT festival, and after pause continued from the second half of August through to mid-September 2006.

A Panasonic AG-DVX100 digital camcorder was used for filming, while archive footage was down-converted from Betacam tapes. Most of the interviews were shot in progressive scan, just to be converted to interlaced, due to archive materials that were all interlaced.

== See also ==
- Novi Sad
- Punk rock in Yugoslavia
- Popular music in the Socialist Federal Republic of Yugoslavia
