= Čista Proza (album) =

Studio album by Čista Proza
- Released: 1983
- Recorded: March 1–31, 1983
- Studio: Meta Sound studio, Novi Sad
- Genre: New wave
- Length: 28:23
- Label: PGP RTB; 2121298
- Producer: Čista Proza

Čista Proza (transl. Pure Prose) is the only studio album by the Yugoslav new wave band Čista Proza, released in 1983.

== Background and recording ==
Formed in 1980, the band spent initial three years of their activity gaining attention of the country's public and media. During the autumn of 1981, in Novi Sad's Meta Studio, the band made a promotional two-song recording, which was broadcast by major Yugoslav radio stations and provided the band with their first television appearances. During March 1983, at Meta Sound, the band recorded their debut album. The songs were composed by the band members, while all the lyrics were written by the band's guitarist Milan Ćirić, except for the song "Krug" ("Circle"), written by bass guitarist Đorđe Pilipović. Thealbum was produced by the band themselves. As guests on the album appeared Zoran Stojšin (keyboards), Fazekaš Tibor (keyboards) and Josip Kovač (saxophone).

== Track listing ==
All lyrics are written by Milan Ćirić, except where noted; all music is composed by Čista Proza.

Side A
No.	Title	Title translation	Length
1.	"U grču, nadam se prolaznog neraspoloženja"	"In Spasm, Hoping that the Dark Mood Is Temporary"	2:33
2.	"Simetrija"	"Symmetry"	2:19
3.	"Zabranjene zone"	"Forbidden Zones"	2:22
4.	"Srce"	"Heart"	2:30
5.	""Krug"" (lyrics by Đorđe Pilipović)	"Circle"	2:30

Side B
No.	Title	Title translation	Length
1.	"Leto"	"Summer"	2:10
2.	"Jutarnje face"	"Morning Faces"	2:41
3.	"Čudno je biti normalan"	"It's Strange Being Normal"	2:49
4.	"Slike"	"Pictures"	3:39
5.	"Neuroza"	"Neurosis"	1:55
6.	"Čista poza"	"Pure Pose"	2:35

== Personnel ==
- Milan Ćirić - guitar, vocals
- Đorđe Pilipović - bass guitar, vocals
- Steva Mijučić - vocals, guitar
- Bakoš Nador "Hati" - drums, guitar

=== Additional personnel ===
- Zoran Stojšin - keyboards
- Fazekaš Tibor - keyboards
- Josip Kovač "Kiki" - saxophone
- Ivica Vlatković - recorded by
- Ivan Ćulum - artwork

== Reception and aftermath ==
The album, released by PGP-RTB in 1983, brought the band's only hit song, "Leto" ("Summer"). After the album release, the band went on a promotional tour and started preparing new material for the second studio album. The album recording started in early 1985 at the Barbaro studio in Bukovac, but after recording only three songs, due to a disagreements between Ćirić and Pilipović, the band ceased to exist.
