= Ako nisam dobra šta ćemo onda? =

Ako nisam dobra, šta ćemo onda?

Studio album by Obojeni Program
- Released: 2001
- Recorded: 2001, band rehearsal room, Novi Sad
- Genre: Indie rock, alternative rock, electronic music, experimental music
- Length: 40:34
- Label: UrbaNS
- Producer: Ilija Vlaisavljević "Bebec"

Obojeni Program chronology
Sva sreća general voli decu (1999)	Ako nisam dobra, šta ćemo onda? (2001)	Da li je to čovek ili je mašina (2005)

Ako nisam dobra, šta ćemo onda? (And If I'm Not Good, What Do We Do?) is the sixth studio album by Serbian indie/alternative rock band Obojeni Program, released by the Serbian independent record label UrbaNS in 2001.

== Track listing ==
All music and lyrics by Obojeni Program.

No.	Title	Length
1.	"Kad se neko nečem dobrom nada" (When Someone is Hoping for Something Good)	3:25
2.	"Ja ne mogu da stanem" (I Cannot Stop)	3:25
3.	"Klonirani dečak" (A Cloned Boy)	3:52
4.	"Najbolji prijatelj" (Best Friend)	4:01
5.	"Uživaj u ludilu nekih malih stvari" (Enjoy the Madness of Some Small Things)	3:23
6.	"Zaštićena od reklame" (Protected From a Commercial)	2:50
7.	"Vidim kako stvari stoje" (I See How Things Stand)	2:35
8.	"Ohrabri me" (Encourage Me)	2:55
9.	"Želim svaki dan biti radostan" (I Want Every Day To Be Joyful)	3:47
10.	"Ruža lutanja" (Rose of Wandering)	2:35
11.	"Stvarno dobar" (Really Good)	4:03
12.	"Čini mi se kao da je skrenuo" (It Seems to Me He Has Gone Astray)	3:34

== Personnel ==
The band

- Branislav Babić "Kebra" — vocals
- Tamara Dobler — vocals, backing vocals
- Dragan Knežević — guitar, backing vocals
- Mirko Topalski — drums
- Zoran Geratović — bass guitar
- Miloš Romić — DJ

Additional personnel

- Saša Mihajlović — design, photography
- Vlada Žeželj — recorded by
- Ilija Vlaisavljević "Bebec" — production
