= Hokej klub Virginitas =

Compilation album by La Strada and Luna
- Released: 1988
- Recorded: 1980–1983
- Genre: New wave, post-punk, gothic rock, dark wave, minimal
- Label: Ding Dong Records 002
- Producer: Peđa Vranješević (tracks 1 and 2); Luna

Luna chronology
Nestvarne stvari (1984)	Hokej klub Virginitas (1988)

Hokej Klub Virginitas (Hockey Club Virginity) is a semi-official compilation album by the Serbian new wave/post-punk bands La Strada and Luna, released in 1988 by Ding Dong Records. The compilation, available on compact cassette only, features recordings made by La Strada at the Peđa Vranešević studio in Novi Sad, consisting of the tracks "On" ("Himself") and "Sat" ("Clock"), Luna recordings "Spori Metropolis", recorded at the Ben Akiba theatre June 27, 1983, an entire March 11 performance at the KCM Sonja Marinković, and the band's early demo recordings made at the Radio Novi Sad and Meta Sound Studio during 1982 and 1983.

== Track listing ==
No.	Title	Length
1.	"On" (Himself)
2.	"Sat" (Clock)
3.	"Hokej klub Virginitas" (Hockey Club Virginity)
4.	"Metropolis"
5.	"Spori Metropolis" (Slow Metropolis)
6.	"Ogledalo Lune" (The Mirror of Luna)
7.	"Intro"
8.	"Amazon" (The Amazon)
9.	"Scerzzo"
10.	"Muzika" (Music)
11.	"Vila" (Fairy)
12.	"Intima" (Intimacy)
13.	"Lambo"
14.	"Balder"

== Notes ==
- Tracks 1 and 2 recorded 1980 at Peđa Vranešević's studio.
- Tracks 3, 4 and 6 recorded at Studio Radio Novi Sad and Meta Sound Studio 1982-83.
- Track 5 recorded live at the Ben Akiba Theatre concert held on 27.VI '83.
- Tracks 7 to 12 recorded live in KCM Sonja Marinković 11.III '83.

== Personnel ==
La Strada

- Dragan Nastasić — guitar
- Siniša llić — guitar
- Boris Oslovčan — bass
- Ivan Fece "Firchie" — drum programming
- Slobodan Tišma — vocals

Luna

- Slobodan Tišma — vocals
- Zoran Bulatović "Bale" — guitar, backing vocals
- Ivan Fece "Firchie" — drums
- Jasmina Mitrušić — synthesizer, backing vocals
