= La Strada (band) =

Serbian and former Yugoslav band

- La Strada in 1985, from left to right: Daniel Stari, Žolt Horvat, Robert Radić, Jasmina Mitrušić and Slobodan Tišma

Background information
- Origin: Novi Sad, Serbia, Yugoslavia
- Genres: New wave; post-punk; alternative rock; neo-psychedelia; indie pop
- Years active: 1979 – 1981; 1984 – 1987
- Labels: PGP-RTB, "M" Produkcija Radio Novog Sada, Ding Dong, PMK
- Past members: see the members section

La Strada (Serbian Cyrillic: Ла Страда; Italian for The Road) was a Serbian and former Yugoslav new wave and later alternative rock band from Novi Sad.

Formed in 1979 by Slobodan Tišma, the band recorded a three-song demo which was often broadcast on Radio Novi Sad. Having changed several lineups and despite having well received live appearances, the band disbanded in 1981. Tišma with at the time La Strada members Zoran Bulatović "Bale" and Ivan Fece "Firchie" formed Luna. After the Luna disbandment, in 1984 Tišma re-formed La Strada with the former La Strada bassist Danijel Stari, former Luna member Jasmina Mitrušić "Mina", guitarist Žolt Horvat and drummer Robert Radić. The lineup entered the studio during the same year, however, it was in 1987 that the eponymous debut album La strada was released. After the album release the band lineup had changed but the band nevertheless disbanded soon afterward. In 2004, Luna reunited and performed at the Exit festival, and during the same year Tišma performed a solo concert with a half-hour set of La Strada songs at the Pančevo Grrr! festival, with the recording from the performance being released in 2011 under the La Strada moniker.

== History ==
=== New wave years (1979–1981) ===
In 1979, Slobodan Tišma (guitar, lead vocals) also known as "Deda" ("Grandpa"), a rock veteran and poet, inspired by the increasing popularity of new wave music in Yugoslavia formed La Strada, naming it after the Federico Fellini movie La Strada. The rest of the band consisted of Danijel Stari (bass guitar, arrangements), Boris Oslovčan "Bora" (bass guitar), Siniša Ilić "Siki" (guitar) and Dragan Nastasić "Gane" (guitar) and a temporary drummer Siniša Sekulić "Sekula". The band functioned with a studio and a live lineup as Stari did not want to perform live and bassist Oslovčan was his live replacement and drummer Sekulić also did not perform live so the band instead used a rhythm machine. The lineup made their first recordings in the Vranešević brothers studio, which consisted of three songs "On" ("Himself"), "Sat" ("Clock") and "Narcis" ("Narcicus") which were often broadcast on radio Novi Sad's shows Yu Pop Scena (Yu Pop Scene) and Novi Vidici (New Views) hosted by Dragan Gojković "Goja", one of the promoters of new wave music in Novi Sad. The former two tracks appeared on the semi-official compilation album Hokej klub Virginitas (Hokey Club Virginity), released in 1988 by Ding Dong Records.

After the recording of the tracks both of the band's guitarists left the band and were replaced by Predrag Ostojić "Preža" (guitar) and Ivan Fece "Firchie" (drums). The new lineup made their first live appearance in 1980 at the Novi Sad club No. 1 as an opening act for Električni Orgazam. In May of the following year, the band performed at Festival Omladina, and at the Novi Sad Danube park handball playground, performing as an opening act for the band Film. After the performance at the Belgrade KST club in June 1981, due to a misunderstanding between the band members, bassist Oslovčan and then guitarist Ostojić left the band. After their departure Tišma remained the only guitar player and the new bassist became the former Pekinška Patka member Zoran Bulatović "Bale". At the time, the band was preparing for a three-date mini tour, including Novi Sad, Pančevo and Belgrade, organized by the Muzička Omladina concert agency, with the bands Lačni Franz, Čista Proza and Fotomodeli. Despite being well-accepted at the performances, the band ceased to exist and Tišma, Fece and Bulatović went on to form Luna.

=== Re-formation (1984–1987) ===
After Luna disbanded, in 1984, Tišma and Stari, along with former Luna keyboard player and vocalist Jasmina Mitrušić "Mina", and former Gomila G and Kontraritam guitarist Žolt Horvat and drummer Robert Radić re-formed La Strada. During the early 1985, in the annual Džuboks magazine's poll La Strada was pronounced as the greatest expectation of 1985. During the spring of 1985, the song "Želje" ("Wishes") appeared on the various artists compilation Ventilator 202 vol. 3. After successful performances in Belgrade, Novi Sad, Zagreb, at the Yu Rock Momenat festival, the band entered the Radio Novi Sad studio 1 in order to record the material for their debut album with Mitar Subotić, also known as Rex Illusivi, as the album producer. The entire material was recorded in a single day, which was the reason why Tišma was not content with his vocal performance as he was exhausted after watching the entire Live Aid concert broadcast the day before. The recordings were then sent to the at the time editor of PGP RTB records Petar Popović, who was interested in releasing the material. However, after the label editor had changed, the new editor Oliver Mandić declined the material.

In 1987 the music editors of Radio Novi Sad agreed to release the debut La Strada and Rex Illusivi albums in order to mark the thirtieth anniversary of the show Randevu sa muzikom (A Rendezvous With Music), and both albums were released in a limited printing of 500 copies. Unlike Luna's debut, La strada brought a more calmer and melodic sound, reminiscent of the 1960s psychedelic music combined with Tišma's poetry. The album featured several radio hits, including the song "Okean" ("The Ocean") for which a promotional video had been recorded. After the album release, Jasmina Mitrušić and Daniel Stari left the band and the new band members became a former Ove Sezone Vedri Tonovi guitarist Zoran Lekić "Leki" and the talented teenage bassist Ilija Vlaisavljević "Bebec". The new lineup held a live promotion of the released material before entering the studio in order to record the material for the second studio album. However, after the concert in Subotica during the late 1987, Tišma decided to disband La Strada and the material from the second studio album remained unreleased.

=== Post-breakup ===
After La Strada disbandment, Tišma quit his musical career and released two poetry books, the first Marinizmi (Marinisms) in 1995, and Vrt kao to (Garden As It) in 1997; a collection of his texts released in literary magazines during the late 1980s and early 1990s were published as Blues Diary - Pitoma religiozna razmišljanja (Blues Diary - Cultivated Religious Meditations) in 2001 and he published an autobiographical novel Urvidek in 2005. He also wrote a libretto for a multimedia pseudo-opera Kralj šume (King of the Forest) by Andraš Urban. Mitrušić finished the Musical Academy studies and moved to Italy. In 2001 she participated the Pesme iznad istoka i zapada (Songs Above the East and the West), featuring Serbian rock musicians performing music to the poems by Bishop Nikolaj Velimirović, with the written music and arrangement for the poem "Vladaj, Bože" ("Reign, God"). In 2004, the two reunited with the rest of the default Luna lineup and performed at the annual Exit festival. During the same year, Tišma held a solo concert at the Pančevo Grrr! festival and the recording from the performance was released the independent record label PMK as La Strada official bootleg album Grrr! 2004, released on CD in a limited edition of 150 copies during the late 2011. In 2012, he won the NIN Award for his novel Bernardijeva soba (Bernardi's Room).

== Legacy ==
Several Serbian bands have covered La Strada songs. The Novi Sad indie rock band Boye on their 1990 album 78 in the song "Ja sam radosna" ("I am Joyful"), featuring the lyrics by Slobodan Tišma, sampled the song "Mlad i radostan". The Vrbas alternative rock band Veliki Prezir recorded a cover version of "Okean" on the 1999 cover various artists cover album Korak napred 2 koraka nazad, the Niš punk rock band Novembar recorded a cover of "Mlad i radostan" on their 2008 cover album Radulizam, and the Belgrade alternative music group Horkestar, consisting of a five-piece band and a thirty piece choir, covered the song "Neautentičan sneg" on their live appearances.

The song "Okean" was ranked on the No. 39 on the B92 Top 100 Domestic Songs, polled by the Radio B92 listeners in 2006.

== Members ==
Former members

- Slobodan Tišma "Deda" – vocals, guitar (1979–1981, 1984–1987)
- Daniel Stari – bass guitar (1979–1981, 1984–1987)
- Dragan Nastasić – guitar (1979–1980)
- Siniša Ilić "Siki" – guitar (1979–1980)
- Boris Oslovčan "Bora" – bass guitar (1979–1981)
- Siniša Sekulić "Sekula" – drums (1979–1980)
- Predrag Ostojić "Preža" – guitar (1980–1981)
- Ivan Fece "Firchie" – drums (1980–1981)
- Zoran Bulatović "Bale" – bass guitar (1981)
- Jasmina Mitrušić "Mina" – keyboards, backing vocals (1984–1987)
- Žolt Horvat – guitar (1984–1987)
- Robert Radić – drums (1984–1987)
- Zoran Lekić "Leki" – guitar (1987)
- Ilija Vlaisavljević "Bebec" – bass guitar (1987)

== Discography ==
=== Studio albums ===
- La strada (1987)

=== Live albums ===
- Grrr! 2004 (2011)

=== Other appearances ===
- "Želje" (Ventilator 202 vol. 3; 1985)
- "On" / "Sat" (Hokej klub Virginitas; 1988)
