= Sva sreća general voli decu =

Studio album by Obojeni Program
- Released: 1999
- Recorded: July 7 – November 1, 1998, Studio M Radio Television Novi Sad
- Genre: Indie rock, alternative rock, electronic music, experimental music
- Length: 53:23
- Label: B92
- Producer: Ilija Vlaisavljević "Bebec", UrbaNS

Obojeni Program chronology
Ili 5 minuta ispred tebe (1996)	Sva sreća general voli decu (1999)	Ako nisam dobra šta ćemo onda? (2001)

Sva sreća general voli decu (Such Good Fortune, The General Likes Children) is the fifth studio album by the Serbian indie/alternative rock band Obojeni Program released by a Serbian independent record label B92 in 1999.

== Track listing ==
All music and lyrics by Obojeni Program.

No.	Title	Length
1.	"Lizalica i jo-jo" (A Lollypop and Yo-Yo)	0:47
2.	"Bum-bum koma" (Boom-boom Coma)	2:12
3.	"Za tebe nosim papuče i kljun" (For You I am Wearing Slippers and a Beak)	3:13
4.	"Higijena, nebo, pa mi" (Hygiene, the Sky, Then We)	0:22
5.	"Haljina na cvetove od tebe do vrata" (A Floral Dress From You to the Door)	1:47
6.	"Srce srce srce - remix Smokin' J." (Heart Heart Heart - Remix Smokin' J)	3:32
7.	"Baš sam pametan - vau" (I'm So Smart - Wow)	3:58
8.	"Neonsko ljubavna idila na Jusi" (Neon Love Idyl at Jusa)	1:02
9.	"Lavor, mesec i pas protiv zidara i mađioničara" (Washbowl, the Moon and Dog Against Stonemasons and Magicians)	4:02
10.	"Fantastično brz šekspirolog" (A Fantastically Fast Shakespeareologist)	3:09
11.	"Autobran" (Autoshield)	3:20
12.	"Autobran - remix Smokin' J." (Autoshield - Remix Smokin' J.)	1:12
13.	"Ilustrovani namaz za kućnog ljubimca" (An Illustrated Smear for a Pet)	2:10
14.	"Sedmica od čarapa na ose" (A Seven Made of Socks on Wasps)	3:12
15.	"Lup krokodila u kadi" (A Knock of A Crocodile in the Tub)	1:33
16.	"A-A-A"	2:23
17.	"Kamioni, kameleoni i karamele" (Trucks, Chameleons and Caramels)	1:55
18.	"Federi" (Springs)	1:34
19.	"Da; mama" (Yes; Mama)	0:26
20.	"Srca srca srca" (Hearts Hearts Hearts)	3:08
21.	"Vatrogasci duge gase" (Firemen Extinguish Rainbows)	2:06
22.	"Lanac kroz rukav za srce" (A Chain Through the Heart Sleeve)	1:20
23.	"Intro"	0:25
24.	"Fudbal tehma - Boye + Smokin' J." (Football Tehme - Boye + Smokin' J.)	4:28

== Personnel ==
The band

- Branislav Babić "Kebra" — vocals
- Tamara Dobler — vocals, backing vocals
- Dragan Knežević — guitar, backing vocals
- Slobodan Levakov — drums, tambourine, whistle
- Zoran Geratović — bass guitar
- Smokin' J. — remixes

Additional personnel

- Saša Stojanović — artwork [design]
- AD Design Novi Sad — artwork [design]
- Vlada Žeželj — engineer [post-production]
- UrbaNS — executive producer
- Ilija Vlaisavljević "Bebec" — guitar, bass guitar, production
- Jan Šaš — recorded by
- Jovan Matić — recorded by [assistant]
