= Čista Proza =

Former Yugoslav band

- Čista Proza in 1983

Background information
- Origin: Novi Sad, SR Serbia, SFR Yugoslavia
- Genres: New wave
- Years active: 1980–1985
- Label: PGP-RTB
- Past members: Milan Ćirić; Đorđe Pilipović; Stevan Mijučić; Nandor Bakoš; Dragan Kašiković; Miroslav Papić

Čista Proza (Serbian Cyrillic: Чиста Проза; trans. Pure Prose) was a Yugoslav new wave band formed in Novi Sad in 1980. Despite releasing only one, self-titled album in 1983, the group was a notable act of the Yugoslav new wave scene.

== History ==
=== 1980–1985 ===
In the summer of 1979, guitarist Milan Ćirić and bass guitarist Đorđe Pilipović met at the island of Krk, where they both performed with their own bands. Pilipović lived in Novi Sad, where he studied law, and Ćirić lived in Opatija, but as the latter had already planned to move to Novi Sad in order to study English language and literature at the University of Novi Sad, the two decided to start a band after Ćirić moves to the city. The two started looking for musicians, mainly via adverts in Novi Sad daily Dnevnik. Rehearsing with different musicians, for a while they worked with Ivan Fece "Firchie", at the time playing with La Strada. With the arrival of Stevan Miljučić (guitar, vocals) and Nandor Bakoš "Hati" (drums) in 1980, Čista Proza was officially formed.

Initially, the band mainly performed at youth work actions and similar events organized by Novi Sad Musical Youth organization. They had their first notable performance at the 1981 Subotica Youth Festival, which was followed by a series of successful appearances in Novi Sad, Belgrade and Zagreb. During the autumn of 1981, in Novi Sad's Meta Studio, the band made a promotional two-song recording, which was broadcast by major Yugoslav radio stations and provided the band with their first television appearances. On the New Year's Eve of 1982, the band performed at the Grok festival in Novi Sad, along with Bulevar, Paraf, Patrola, Buldogi, Grad and other bands of the country's new wave scene. After the performance, Bakoš temporarily left the band, being firstly replaced by Gradski Magazin (City Magazine) member Dragan Kašiković, and then by Miroslav Papić. In the meantime, the band started preparing their debut album, for which the recording sessions started on Bakoš's return, during March 1983 at Novi Sad's Meta Sound studio.

The band's debut, titled simply Čista Proza, was released by PGP-RTB in 1983. All the lyrics were written by Ćirić, except for the song "Krug" ("Circle"), written by Pilipović. As guests on the album appeared Zoran Stojšin (keyboards), Fazekaš Tibor (keyboards) and Josip Kovač (saxophone). Produced by the band themselves, the album brought the band's only hit "Leto" ("Summer").

After the album release, the band went on a promotional tour, mainly performing in the province of Vojvodina, and started preparing new material for the second studio album. The album recording started in early 1985 at the Barbaro studio in Bukovac, but after recording only three songs, due to a disagreements between Ćirić and Pilipović, the band ceased to exist.

=== Post breakup ===
After the disbandment of Čista Proza, Ćirić opened a studio in Novi Sad. Having worked as a producer with acts such as KUD Idijoti, Partibrejkers, Instant Karma, Balkan and others, he moved to Netherlands, where he opened his Sing Sing studio. In his Dutch studio he worked with a number of bands from his home country, including Obojeni Program, Boye, Love Hunters and others, but also with Curtis Knight. For a while he worked as Motörhead sound technician. He died on 29 November 2021.

Pilipović gained a degree in law and worked as a judge in Novi Sad. Bakoš moved to Vienna and became a businessman, and Mijučić founded a marketing company.

== Discography ==
=== Studio albums ===
- Čista Proza (1983)
