= Nestvarne stvari =

Studio album by Luna
- Released: 1984
- Recorded: Aquarius studio, Belgrade; September, 1983
- Genre: Post-punk; Gothic rock
- Length: 42:00
- Label: Helidon (FLP 05-042); Fatalamanga Records (CD reissue)
- Producer: Aleksandar Habić, Luna

Reissue cover

Nestvarne stvari (trans. Unreal Things) is the only album by Serbian post-punk/gothic rock band Luna, released in 1984.

== Track listing ==
All lyrics and music written by Slobodan Tišma and Zoran Bulatović.

No.	Title	Length
1.	"Fakir" (Fakir)	3:21
2.	"Nestvarne stvari" (Unreal Things)	3:13
3.	"Vila" (Fairy)	2:25
4.	"Ogledalo Lune" (The Mirror of Luna)	6:44
5.	"Povratak" (Return)	2:27
6.	"Okean" (The Ocean)	3:23
7.	"Amazon" (The Amazon)	4:08
8.	"Lambo"	3:51
9.	"Intima" (Intimacy)	5:32
10.	"Balder na prozoru" (Balder at the Window)	6:57

== Personnel ==
- Artur (Slobodan Tišma) — vocals
- Balder (Zoran Bulatović "Bale") — guitar, backing vocals
- Firchie (Ivan Fece) — drums
- Jasmina Mitrušić — synthesizer, backing vocals

== Legacy ==
In 2015 Nestvarne stvari album cover was ranked 60th on the list of 100 Greatest Album Covers of Yugoslav Rock published by web magazine Balkanrock.

== External links and other sources ==
- Nestvarne stvari LP at Discogs
- Nestvarne stvari CD at Discogs
- EX YU ROCK enciklopedija 1960-2006, Janjatović Petar; ISBN 978-86-905317-1-4
- NS rockopedija, novosadska rock scena 1963-2003, Mijatović Bogomir; Publisher: SWITCH, 2005
