= Ili 5 minuta ispred tebe =

Studio album by Obojeni Program
- Released: 1996
- Recorded: September–October 1995, Tarcus studio, Zrenjanin
- Genre: Indie rock, alternative rock
- Length: 42:00
- Label: Tarcus, PGP RTS
- Producer: Obojeni Program, Slobodan Stojšić

Obojeni Program chronology
Verujem ti jer smo isti (1994)	Ili 5 minuta ispred tebe (1996)	Sva sreća general voli decu (1999)

Ili 5 minuta ispred tebe (If Not 5 Minutes Before You) is the fourth studio album by the Serbian indie/alternative rock band Obojeni Program released by the Serbian independent record label Tarcus, as well as PGP RTS in 1996.

== Track listing ==
All music and lyrics by Obojeni Program.

No.	Title	Length
1.	"Policajac" (Policaman)	3:21
2.	"Usne su mi zelene" (My Lips are Green)	2:42
3.	"Idem glav(n)om stranom" (I am Head(ing) the Main Side)	2:35
4.	"Tetka Suzi" (Aunt Suzie)	0:40
5.	"Dragon"	2:08
6.	"Neptun žuti" (Neptune the Yellow)	1:53
7.	"Pažnja" (Attention)	2:54
8.	"Mačka" (Cat)	2:46
9.	"Šta se njemu desilo" (What Has Happened to Him)	2:19
10.	"Sve u redu" (All in Order)	2:52
11.	"Tri sa sobom" (Three with Oneself)	2:03
12.	"Ostali su nam samo snovi" (Dreams are the Only Thing Left for Us)	2:15
13.	"Sepi Dru" (Sappy Drue)	5:02
14.	"Tri mornara" (Three Sailors)	2:03

== Personnel ==
The band

- Branislav Babić "Kebra" — vocals
- Danica Milovanov "Daca" — vocals, backing vocals
- Jovanka Ilić — vocals, backing vocals
- Dragan Knežević — guitar, backing vocals
- Vladimir Cinkocki "Cina" — drums
- Ljubomir Pejić "Ljuba" — bass guitar

Additional personnel

- Slobodan Stojšić — executive producer
- Branislav Đerić — recorded by
- Mileta Grujić — recorded by
- Miloš Romić "Šomi" — sampler
- Zoran Erkman "Zerkman" — trumpet
- Ivana Vince — backing vocals
- Jelena Ilić — backing vocals
