= Kako to misliš: mi =

Studio album by Obojeni Program
- Released: April 6, 2012
- Recorded: November 2011 – February 2012, Standard and Do-re-Mi studios, Novi Sad, Serbia; Studio 150, Amsterdam, Netherlands (mastering)
- Genre: Indie rock, alternative rock, electronic music, experimental music
- Length: 36:03
- Label: Exit Music (digital download); Odličan Hrčak (CD)
- Producer: Ilija Vlaisavljević "Bebec"

Obojeni Program chronology
Kosmos u tvom srcu / Igračke se voze levom rukom (2009)	Kako to misliš: mi (2012)

Professional ratings
Review scores
Source	Rating
Terapija	7/10 stars
Jelen Top 10	Favorable
Balkanrock.com	4/5 stars

Kako to misliš: mi (What Do You Mean By 'Us' ) is the eighth studio album by the Serbian indie/alternative rock band Obojeni Program released by the Serbian netlabel Exit Music for free digital download as well as the independent record label Odličan Hrčak in 2012.

== Track listing ==
All music and lyrics by Obojeni Program.

No.	Title	Length
1.	"Da li smo naučili živeti u kapsuli" (Have We Learned To Live in a Capsule)	2:41
2.	"Svi Mi Nekom Trebamo" (All of Us Are Needed by Somebody)	1:41
3.	"Kako To Misliš Mi" (What Do You Mean By 'Us')	3:57
4.	"Kako ja to ne primećujem" (How Come I Don't Notice It)	2:12
5.	"Ljudi znaju samo ono što im se kaže" (People Only Know What They Are Told)	3:12
6.	"Problem ne postoji" (The Problem Does Not Exist)	4:36
7.	"Samo ta ideja" (Only That Idea)	1:20
8.	"Ti si samo promaja" (You Are Just a Draught)	2:09
9.	"U tvoj osmeh stane sve" (Everything Fits In Your Smile)	2:42
10.	"Svaka definicija gubitak je slobode" (Every Definition is a Loss of Freedom)	2:53
11.	"Samo da ti kažem postalo je sve nevidljivo" (Let Me Just Tell You That Everything Has Become Invisible)	3:08
12.	"Mene to ne zanima" (I Am Not Interested in That)	4:13
13.	"Samo ono što im se kaže" (Only What They Are Told)	1:19

== Personnel ==
The band

- Branislav Babić "Kebra" — vocals
- Ilija Vlaisavljević "Bebec" — bass guitar, production
- Ljubomir Pejić "Ljuba" — bass guitar, backing vocals
- Vladimir Cinkocki "Cina" — drums, backing vocals

Additional personnel

- Biljana Babić — vocals, backing vocals
- Jelena Katjez — vocals, backing vocals
