= Ovaj zid stoji krivo =

Obojeni Program

Studio album by Obojeni Program
- Released: 1991
- Recorded: August–September 1991, Guru Sound studio
- Genre: Indie rock, alternative rock
- Length: 36:56
- Label: Tom Tom Music
- Producer: Dušan Kojić "Koja"

Obojeni Program chronology
| Najvažnije je biti zdrav (1990) | Obojeni Program (1991) | Prijatelju kočnice ti ne rade baš sve (1992) |

Ovaj zid stoji krivo (On One Side is this Wall Bended) is the second studio album by the Serbian indie/alternative rock band Obojeni Program released by the Serbian independent record label Tom Tom Music in 1991. The album was released in LP and cassette format only and was rereleased on CD only as a part of the compilation album Obojeni program consisting of the material from the first two studio albums.

== Track listing ==
All music and lyrics by Obojeni Program.

| No. | Title | Length |
|---|---|---|
| 1. | "Čudan glas te poziva" (A Strange Voice is Calling You) | 3:40 |
| 2. | "981" | 4:26 |
| 3. | "Umoran je ovaj dan" (This Day is Tired) | 3:04 |
| 4. | "Poklanjam ti sebe" (I Give Myself to You) | 4:29 |
| 5. | "Slobodan i nestvaran" (Free and Unreal) | 3:06 |
| 6. | "Nebo, nebo plavo je" (The Sky, the Sky is Blue) | 4:50 |
| 7. | "Hladan kao sunce" (Cold as the Sun) | 3:09 |
| 8. | "Krećem se u pravcu Ra" (I am Moving Towards Ra) | 3:13 |
| 9. | "Dejvi" (Davy) | 3:59 |
| 10. | "Pozivamo tople reke" (We are Inviting Warm Rivers) | 3:00 |

== Personnel ==
The band

- Bedov Miroslav — bass guitar
- Edi Keler — drums
- Zoran Lekić "Leki" — guitar
- Branislav Babić "Kebra" — vocals

Additional personnel

- Momir Grujić "Fleka" — design [logo]
- Toba — photography
- Dušan Kojić "Koja" — production
- Vlada Žeželj — recorded by
