= Verujem ti jer smo isti =

Studio album by Obojeni Program
- Released: 1994
- Recorded: February – June 1994, Studio R.N.S, Novi Sad
- Genre: Indie rock, alternative rock
- Length: 42:00
- Label: Metropolis Records
- Producer: Obojeni Program, Dragan Džolić

Obojeni Program chronology
Obojeni program (1993)	Verujem ti jer smo isti (1994)	Ili 5 minuta ispred tebe (1996)

Professional ratings
Review scores
Source	Rating
Ritam	5/5 stars

Verujem ti jer smo isti (Very Similar Indeed We are So I Believe You) is the third studio album by the Serbian indie/alternative rock band Obojeni Program released by the Serbian independent record label Metropolis Records in 1994.

== Track listing ==
All music and lyrics by Obojeni Program.

No.	Title	Length
1.	"Tebe tražim" (It is You I am Looking For)	4:02
2.	"Čarobna su osećanja" (Emotions are Magical)	3:46
3.	"Pa da!" (That's It!)	2:56
4.	"Kočnice" (Breaks)	3:08
5.	"ABCD avioni" (ABCD Airplanes)	3:54
6.	"Ruža lutanja" (Rose of Wandering)	3:25
7.	"Alo Alo" (Hello Hello)	4:51
8.	"Eliot je sreda" (Elliot is Wednesday)	3:41
9.	"Pametni i lepi" (The Intelligent and Pretty)	3:29
10.	"Reforma u vašoj glavi" (A Reform in Your Head)	2:06
11.	"Vi ste ljudi" (You Are Human)	3:31
12.	"Razgovor" (Conversation)	3:11

== Personnel ==
The band

- Branislav Babić "Kebra" — vocals
- Danica Milovanov "Daca" — vocals, backing vocals
- Jovanka Ilić — vocals, backing vocals
- Dragan Knežević — guitar, backing vocals
- Vladimir Cinkocki "Cina" — drums
- Ljubomir Pejić "Ljuba" — bass guitar

Additional personnel

- Miroslav Mandić — recitation on track 6
- Dragan Džolić — executive producer
- Jan Šaš — recorded by
- Vlada Žeželj — sampler
