= Betterwird =

- Hamlet
- Location in the Netherlands Betterwird (Netherlands)
- Country: Netherlands
- Province: Friesland
- Municipality: Noardeast-Fryslân
- Time zone: UTC+1 (CET)
  - Summer (DST): UTC+2 (CEST)
- Postal code: 9156
- Dialing code: 0519

Betterwird or Betterwurd is a hamlet in the municipality of Noardeast-Fryslân in Friesland, the Netherlands. Before 2019, the village was part of the Dongeradeel municipality.

Betterwird is not a statistical entity, and the postal authorities have placed it under Bornwird. The name Betterwird is nowadays also used for an industrial zone of Dokkum. It has no place name signs. In 1840, it was home to 203 people. Nowadays, it consists of about 7 houses.
