= Obojeni Program =

Serbian alternative rock band

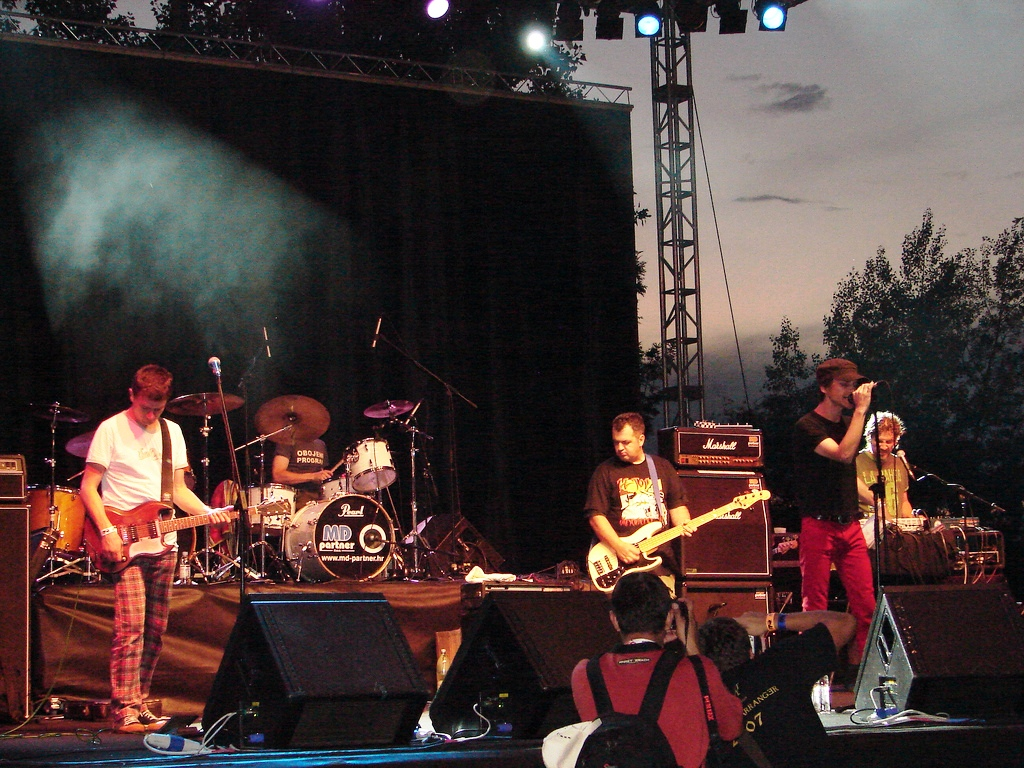
- Obojeni Program performing live at the 2007 VIP INmusic festival in Zagreb

Background information
- Also known as: Program, OP, Coloured Program, oBOYEni Program
- Origin: Novi Sad, Serbia
- Genres: New wave; post-punk; art punk; alternative rock; indie rock; electronic music; experimental music
- Years active: 1980 – present
- Labels: Search & Enjoy, Sorabia, Metropolis, Tarcus, Tom Tom Music, Radio B92, urbaNS, Hello Bing, Exit Music, Odličan Hrčak
- Members: Branislav Babić; Ilija Vlaisavljević; Ljubomir Pejić; Vladimir Cinkocki
- Past members: see the members section
- Website: www.obojeniprogram.rs

Obojeni Program (Serbian Cyrillic: Обојени Програм, trans. Colored Program) is a Yugoslav and Serbian alternative rock band from Novi Sad. The band are pioneers of the Serbian alternative rock scene. The first letters of the band's first seven studio albums form the name of their home town. They have performed at every Exit festival since the first in 2000, with the exception of the virtual Exit held in September 2020.

== History ==
=== Early career (1980–1988) ===
Before forming the band, vocalist Branislav Babić "Kebra" was a member of the two minor Novi Sad punk rock groups, Abortus and Pankreas. With the latter, Babić performed at the Zemun Punk festival, where the members of the Belgrade punk group Urbana Gerila approached him and asked to join them. He became their member, but only for a few months. One of the first Obojeni Program lineups was a trio, featuring Babić (vocals), Goran Ivčić "Tukša" (bass) and Edi Keler (drums). They sounded similar to the early period of Disciplina Kičme, which was formed two years later.

Lasting only for six months, the band was transformed into a quintet featuring Babić, Bora Oslovčan, Pera Telarov, Aleksandar Koledin "Kole" and Aleksandar Jocić "Cana", who used to change instruments during their performances. Moving towards a more post-punk oriented sound, influenced by the Manchester bands The Fall and Magazine, Babić renamed the group to Program, with the lineup which besides him featured Aleksandar Jocić "Cana" (guitar), Zoran Geratović "Gera" (bass) and Edi Keler (drums). Having performed for a year, the band renamed itself to Obojeni Program.

The first live appearance the band had in 1981, at the Novi Sad's club Bronx, performing their songs only, with Babić singing with his back towards the crowd, which became a part of his stage performance for a while. During the same year, at the first Novi Sad private studio Meta Sound, the band recorded four tracks, "Kad bi malo (7x) mozak stao" ("If the (7x) Brain Could Stop a Little"), "O, da li?" ("Oh, Is It?"), "Obojeni program" ("Coloured Program"), and "Ulični kerovi" ("Street Dogs"), produced by the former member Bora Oslovčan. The recordings were often broadcast on Radio Novi Sad, especially in the Yu pop scena (Yu Pop Scene) radio show hosted by Dragan Gojković "Goja".

After the media presentation, the band started performing across the former Yugoslavia, including Belgrade, Zagreb, Osijek and Ljubljana. In February 1982, as a part of the Novosadski novi talas (Novi Sad New Wave) manifestation, the band performed at the Vienna Arena, sharing the stage with the groups Grad, Ove Sezone Vedri Tonovi, Imperium of Jazz, Boye, and Luna. During the same year, with the latter two bands, Obojeni Program often performed in Novi Sad and Belgrade. The following year, the band appeared in the director Želimir Žilnik's movie Drugi talas (The Second Wave). The band would later appear another Žilnik movie, the 1988 Tako se kalio čelik (The Way Steel Was Tempered), and the TV drama Prvo tromesečje Pavla Hromiša (The First Quarter of Pavle Hromiš), with the band members appearing as well as their music being used as the soundtrack. During 1983, the band recorded three new songs, "Filadelfija" ("Philadelphia"), "Gradonačelnik se buni" ("The Mayor is Angry") and "Gospodar vaših stolica" ("The Lord of Your Chairs"), later renamed to "981", and a new version of the local hit "O, da li?". Once again, the recordings were made at the Meta Sound studio and produced by Bora Oslovčan.

After the song recording, the band refused to perform at the Festival Omladina, due to the mainstream popularity of the festival. At the time, bassist Geratović left the band, moving to Australia, being replaced by the former Pečat member Miroslav Bedov "Micke". However, the band went on an eighteen-months hiatus soon after this due to Babić's army obligations. Having returned from the army, in June 1985, Babić reformed the band as a trio, featuring bassist Bedov and Edi Keler on drums. Zoran Lekić "Leki", guitar player of Ove Sezone Vedri Tonovi who has been playing saxophone with Obojeni Program since 1982, occasionally performed as an additional member. During the same year, the band performed at the Split Alternative rock festival. For the following four years, the band had performed across the country, but with frequent member changes, which was the reason why the band did not record any material during the period.

=== Alternative period (1989–1998) ===
In 1989, the lineup which lasted for a while, featuring Branislav Babić "Kebra" (vocals), Robert Radić (drums), Branislav Bukurov (guitar), Miroslav Bedov (bass) and Maša Žilnik (backing vocals) performed at the Subotica Youth festival, winning the second place. The song "Kad bi malo (7x) mozak stao" performed at the Festival Omladina appeared on the festival official compilation. The band also performed at the YURM festival where they entered the finals and in Zagreb where they won the first place. At the festival, the band met Zagreb journalists Aleksandar Dragaš and Ante Čikara who founded the independent record label Search & Enjoy only to release the material recorded by the band. Having finished the album recordings, Bukurov left the band, and Zoran Lekić became the new guitarist.

In May 1990, the band released Najvažnije je biti zdrav (Necessity is To Remain Healthy), through Search & Enjoy. The album, recorded at the Belgrade Akademija studio, for which the album production was done by Disciplina Kičme frontman Dušan Kojić "Koja" and the album cover by the famous Belgrade underground painter Momir Grujić "Fleka", featured a selection from their decade-long career. The songs "Štipaljka" ("Clothespin"), "Filadelfija" ("Philadelphia") and "O, da li?" ("Oh, is it?"), featured Babić's unique vocal style and a stiff musical background, owing to which the band had often been compared to the Greater Manchester band The Fall. A promotional video was recorded for the song "Štipaljka", which became the album's greatest hit. After the album release, the band went on a promotional tour, including Belgrade, Zagreb, Ljubljana, Maribor, Split, Dubrovnik, Skopje and Novi Sad.

The followup, Ovaj zid stoji krivo (On the Side is this Wall Bended), recorded at the Guru Sound studio during August and September 1991, was released during the late 1991 and once again produced by Kojić. It featured the notable "Nebo, nebo plavo je" ("The Sky, the Sky Is Blue"), inspired by the outbreak of the Yugoslav Wars, "Čudan glas te poziva" ("A Strange Voice Is Calling You"), "Pozivamo tople reke" ("We Are Inviting Warm Rivers"), "981", and "Dejvi" ("Davy"), the latter two being recorded for the first album but were omitted, presented as an array of Babić's claustrophobic visions. Guest appearances on the album featured the producer Kojić, who played the guitar on several songs, the members of the Novi Sad band Boye, who did backing vocals, and Disciplina Kičme member Zoran Erkman "Zerkman", who played the trumpet. The band was pronounced the album of the year at the TV Revija magazine, and the gained popularity of the band provided album sales in former Yugoslav republics. By the end of 1991, the band had suddenly disbanded.

In early 1992, Babić reformed the band in the lineup featuring Danica Milovanov "Daca" (backing vocals), Dragan Knežević (guitar), Ljubomir Pejić (drums) and Boye bassist Ilija Vasiljević "Bebec" as a temporary member, promoting live the second album, for the first time in Serbian cities Kragujevac, Užice and Niš. On April, the band had performed at the Belgrade Republic Square in front of a crowd of fifty thousand people at an antiwar concert Ne računajte na nas (Do Not Count on Us), also featuring Rambo Amadeus, Boye, Električni Orgazam, and Rimtutituki, and on December, the band performed at the Subotica antiwar concert Muzika mira (The Music of Peace).

The recording of the Belgrade KST performance on 1 August 1992 was released the live album Prijatelju kočnice ti ne rade baš sve (My Friend, Not All of Your Breaks are Functioning), available on compact cassette only, which, besides the unreleased title track, featured live versions of the previously released songs. The following year, the Serbian independent record label Music YUser rereleased the material released on the first two studio albums with the bonus track "Nebo, nebo drugo je" ("The Sky, the Sky Is Different") on the compilation album Obojeni program. During the same year, Babić spent six months in London, and during the time he had made contacts with the people from MTV, and the music videos for the songs "981" and "Reforma u vašoj glavi" ("A Reform in Your Head") appeared on the show 120 Minutes, owing to which the songs appeared on several British various artists compilations.

In 1994, the band released the album Verujem ti jer smo isti (Very Similar Indeed We are so I Believe You), in a new lineup featuring backing vocalists Danica Milovanov "Daca" and Jovanka Ilić, guitarist Dragan Knežević, bassist Ljubomir Pejić (a former Vrisak Generacije member) and drummer Vladimir Cinkocki (a former Goblini and Generacija Bez Budućnosti member). With an effective cover done by Talenat and the production done by the band themselves, the band continued working in the same musical direction as on the previous releases. Important songs from the album were "ABCD avioni" ("ABCD Airplanes") and "Ruža lutanja" ("Rose of Wandering"), the latter featuring a recitative by the conceptual artist Miroslav Mandić, the creator of a project of walking around Europe on foot. During the same year, the song "Nebo, nebo plavo je" appeared on the various artists compilation album Radio Utopia, released by B92.

The following album, the 1996 Ili 5 minuta ispred tebe (If Not 5 Minutes Ahead of You), the band had recorded at the Zrenjanin Tarkus studio. Guest appearances on the album featured Zoran Erkman "Zerkman" on trumpet and Ivana Vince on backing vocals. The record label Tarcus, which released the album, also re-released the compilation album Obojeni program. After the album release, and for the first time since the breakup of former Yugoslavia, the band had performed in Slovenia. During the same year, the song "Kočnice" ("Breaks") appeared on the Metropolis Records various artists compilation album Ustani i kreni (Stand up and Go), and the following year, the band appeared on the various artists compilation album Ovo je zemlja za nas?!?, with the song "Dragon".

=== Electronic period (1999–2010) ===
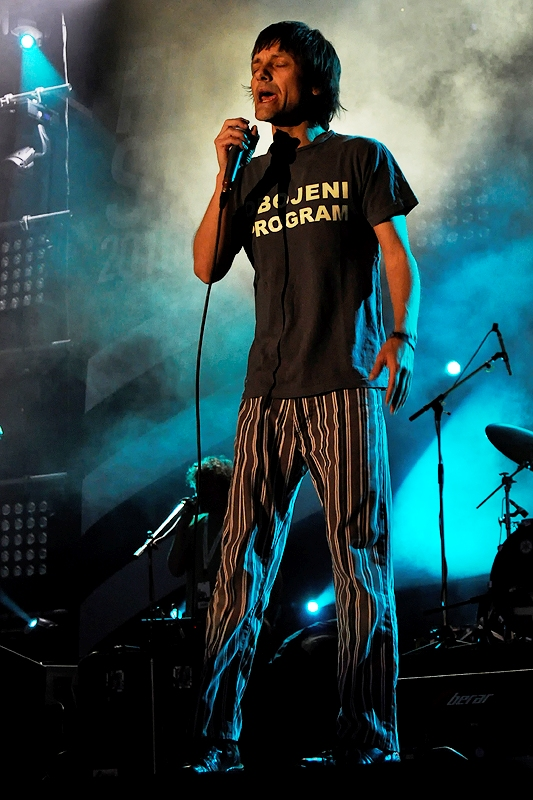
Branislav Babić "Kebra" performing live with Obojeni Program at the 2010 Novi Sad Exit festival

The fifth studio album Sva sreća general voli decu (Such Good Fortune, the General Loves Children), released in 1999 by B92 and produced by Boye bassist Ilija Vasiljević "Bebec", for which the album cover was designed by the painter Saša Stojanović, featuring an ironical drawing of a child displaying Serbian three-finger salute. The album, consisting of twenty four songs, brought a modernized sound, including samples and dance music remix of the Boye song "Fudbal" ("Football"). The lineup which recorded the album featured the new bassist Zoran Geratović "Gera", backing vocalist Tamara Dobler and drummer Slobodan Levakov "Coba". The album also featured two remixed songs, "Srce srce srce" ("Heart Heart Heart") and "Autobran" ("Cardefence"), done by Smokin' J.

In 2002, the album Ako nisam dobra, šta ćemo onda? (And What Do We Do If I Am Not Good?), beside the new songs, featured another miniature done by Miroslav Mandić from his book Ruža lutanja (Rose of wandering). The album received a special critical recognition by the famous disc jockey John Peel who had included the song "Uživaj u ludilu nekih malih stvari" ("Enjoy in the Madness of Small Things") on the BBC Radio playlist. During the same year, the song "Reforma u vašoj glavi" ("A Reform in Your Head") appeared on the Metropolis Records various artists compilation Metropolis vol. 2. The following year, the band performed as an opening act for Placebo at the Belgrade Sports' Hall.

The seventh studio album Da li je to čovek ili je mašina (Do I See a Man or a Machine), released in 2005, was recorded at the former Čista Proza frontman Milan Ćirić "Mile" analogue studio Sing Sing in Netherlands, and during the occasion, the band also held a concert in Amsterdam. Beside the seven new tracks, the album also included the remixed versions of the songs, done by both Serbian and foreign authors. The lineup which recorded the album featured Branislav Babić (vocals), Tamara Dobler (backing vocals), Dragan Knežević (guitar), Miloš Romić (groove box machine), and Miloš Rašković (bass). The journalist Brankica Drašković recorded the documentary about the album recording. The following year, Babić appeared in the Jovan Đerić rockumentary Bilo jednom... (Once upon a Time), dealing with the Novi Sad punk rock scene during the 1990s.

After a four-year discography break, the band, featuring Babić, Vladimir Cinkocki (drums), Ilija Vasiljević "Bebec" (bass) and Ljubomir Pejić (bass), started preparing the eight studio album Kosmos u tvom srcu / Igračke se voze levom rukom (Cosmos in Your Heart / Toys Are Driven with the Left Hand), released on 29 June 2009, recorded at the Sing Sing studio in Metslawier, available in LP format in Netherlands and for free download via the Exit festival record label Exit Music. The album was recorded with Milan Ćirić as the sound engineer and Boris Schmidt as the album producer. The record label Hello Bing, which released the album, also released the 7" single "Ja hoću te" ("I Want You"), a cover of the Boye single, with "981" as the B-side. The single, recorded at the Sing Sing studio in February 2009, was printed in 500 copies only. After the album release, on 18 September that year, the band shared the stage with their idols The Fall, at the Jelen Pivo Live festival, held at the Belgrade SKC.

=== Back to basics (2011–present) ===
The band's latest studio album, Kako to misliš: mi (What Do You Mean: We), was released on 6 April 2012. The album was released for download from the Exit music record label, and on CD through Odličan Hrčak record label. It contains a rerecording of the song "Ja sam idiot" from Najvažnije je biti zdrav. In 2013, the band's first guitarist, Aleksandar Jocić "Cana" returned to the band, the starting to perform in the lineup consisting of Branislav Babić (vocals), Ilija Vlaisavljević (bass guitar), Ljubomir Pejić (bass guitar) and Vladimir Cinkoski (drums). On 19 June 2015 the band celebrated 35 years of activity with a concert in Belgrade's Miskalište. The concert featured the band Virvel as special guests.

On 2 May 2016 the band released the single "Vrlo jednostavno" ("Very Simple"), and on 5 December that year the band released the single "Danas će se desiti nešto lepo" ("Something Nice Will Happen Today"). In December 2017, the band released the single "Kako ja to ne primećujem" ("How Come I Don't Notice That"), announcing the live album Exit 2017, with the recording of their performance on the 2017 Exit festival. The album will be released on vinyl in a limited number of copies.

== Legacy ==
The song "Nebo, nebo plavo je" ("The Sky, the Sky Is Blue") appeared on the 45th place of the B92 Top 100 Domestic Songs, polled by the Radio B92 listeners in 2006.

The lyrics of 4 songs by the band were featured in Petar Janjatović's book Pesme bratstva, detinjstva & potomstva: Antologija ex YU rok poezije 1967 - 2007 (Songs of Brotherhood, Childhood & Offspring: Anthology of Ex YU Rock Poetry 1967 - 2007).

== Members ==
Current members

- Branislav Babić "Kebra" – vocals (1980–present)
- Ilija Vlaisavljević "Bebec" – bass guitar, production (1992, 2011–present)
- Milorad Ristic "Miki" – bass guitar, backing vocals
- Vladimir Cinkocki "Cina" – drums, backing vocals (1994-1997, 2009–present)

Former members

- Edi Keler – drums (1980, 1981–1985, 1991)
- Goran Ivčić "Tukša" – bass guitar (1980)
- Bora Oslovčan – bass guitar, drums, guitar (1980)
- Pera Telarov – guitar, drums, bass guitar (1980)
- Aleksandar Koledin "Kole" – drums, guitar, bass guitar (1980)
- Zoran Geratović "Gera" – bass guitar (1981-1983, 1997–2004)
- Miroslav Bedov "Micke" – bass guitar (1983-1985, 1989–1992, 2001–2004)
- Robert Radić – drums (1988-1990, 2005)
- Branislav Bukurov "Koča" – guitar (1988-1990)
- Maša Žilnik – vocals, backing vocals (1988-1990)
- Zoran Lekić "Leki" – guitar (1991)
- Danica Milovanov "Daca" – vocals, backing vocals (1992-1996)
- Jovan Pejić – drums (1992)
- Dragan Knežević "Gagi" – guitar, backing vocals (1992-2010)
- Jovanka Ilić – vocals, backing vocals (1993-1994)
- Tamara Dobler – vocals, backing vocals (1997-2006)
- Slobodan Levakov "Coba" – drums (1997-1999)
- Mirko Topalski – drums (1999-2005)
- Miloš Romić – groove box (2000-2010)
- Miloš Rašković "Raša" – bass guitar (2004-2007)

== Discography ==
- Najvažnije je biti zdrav (1990)
- Ovaj zid stoji krivo (1991)
- Verujem ti jer smo isti (1994)
- Ili 5 minuta ispred tebe (1996)
- Sva sreća general voli decu (1999)
- Ako nisam dobra, šta ćemo onda? (2002)
- Da li je to čovek ili je mašina (2005)
- Kako to misliš: mi (2012)

== Videography ==
- Drugi talas (1983)
- Prvo tromesečje Pavla Hromiša (1983)
- Tako se kalio čelik (1988)
- Kad se neko nečem dobrom nada (2001)
- Da li je to čovek ili je mašina (2005)
- Bilo jednom... (2006)
