= La strada (album) =

Studio album by La Strada
- Released: 1987
- Recorded: Radio Novi Sad Studio 1, 1986
- Genre: Alternative rock
- Length: 31:01
- Label: M Produkcija Radio Novog Sada; NL 00082
- Producer: Rex Illusivi

La strada is the debut and only album by the Serbian alternative rock La Strada, released by M Produkcija Radio Novog Sada in 1987. Despite being released in LP format in 500 copies only and never rereleased on CD, the album is considered a highly influential release on the former Yugoslav scene.

== Track listing ==
All lyrics and music written by Slobodan Tišma.

No.	Title	Length
1.	"Mlad i radostan" (Young and Joyful)	3:32
2.	"Došla su tako neka vremena" (Such Times Have Come)	2:55
3.	"Neautentični sneg" (Inauthentic Snow)	3:57
4.	"Pesak i sunce" (The Sand and the Sun)	3:12
5.	"Okean" (The Ocean)	4:50
6.	"Plavi tonic" (Blue Tonic)	5:40
7.	"Mama Luna" (Mother Luna)	5:55

== Personnel ==
La Strada

- Daniel Stari — bass
- Robert Radić — drums
- Žolt Horvat — guitar
- Jasmina Mitrušić — keyboards
- Slobodan Tišma — vocals

Additional personnel

- Rex Ilusivii — producer
- Jan Šaš — sound engineer
- Boro Popržan — artwork by [design]

== Cover versions ==
- Serbian alternative rock band Veliki Prezir recorded a cover version of "Okean" on the 1999 cover various artists compilation Korak napred 2 koraka nazad.
- Serbian punk rock band Novembar recorded a cover version of "Mlad i radostan" on their 2008 cover album Radulizam.
- The Serbian alternative music group Horkestar, composed of a five-piece band and a thirty-piece choir, performs the song "Neautentičan sneg" on their live appearances.
