= Najvažnije je biti zdrav =

Studio album by Obojeni Program
- Released: 1990
- Recorded: 1989, Akademija studio, Belgrade
- Genre: Indie rock, alternative rock
- Length: 31:48
- Language: Serbo-Croatian
- Label: Search & Enjoy
- Producer: Dušan Kojić "Koja"

Obojeni Program chronology
| Omladina '89 (1989) | Najvažnije je biti zdrav (1990) | Ovaj zid stoji krivo (1980) |

Professional ratings
Review scores
| Source | Rating |
|---|---|
| Novi Ritam | 5/5 stars |

Najvažnije je biti zdrav (Being healthy is what's most important) is the debut studio album by the Yugoslav and Serbian indie/alternative rock band Obojeni Program released in 1990 by independent record label Search & Enjoy, based in Croatia. The album was released in LP and cassette format only and was rereleased on CD only as a part of the compilation album Obojeni program, which included of material from their first two studio albums.

== Track listing ==
All music and lyrics by Obojeni Program.

| No. | Title | Length |
|---|---|---|
| 1. | "Štipaljka" (Clothespin) | 3:26 |
| 2. | "To još nisam rekao" (I still haven't said that) | 2:18 |
| 3. | "U tvoj osmeh stane sve" (Everything fits inside your smile) | 1:45 |
| 4. | "Kosmos u tvom srcu" (The cosmos in your heart) | 3:24 |
| 5. | "O, da li?" (Oh, really?) | 3:03 |
| 6. | "Ona je tu!" (She's there!) | 3:21 |
| 7. | "Filadelfija" (Philadelphia) | 2:57 |
| 8. | "Reči same govore" (Words speak for themselves) | 3:13 |
| 9. | "Hvala!" (Thanks!) | 3:20 |
| 10. | "Uzmi me!" (Take Me!) | 2:54 |
| 11. | "Kad bi malo...sedam puta...mozak stao" (Imagine if for just a little... seven times... the brain stopped working) | 3:07 |

== Personnel ==
The band

- Bedov Miroslav — bass guitar
- Radić Robert — drums
- Bukurov Branislav — guitar
- Babić Branislav "Kebra" — vocals
- Žilnik Maša — vocals

Additional personnel

- Momir Grujić "Fleka" — design [colouring and packaging]
- Branislav Rašić — photography by
- Dušan Kojić "Koja" — production
- Miroslav Dukić "Geza" — recorded by
