= Mitselwier =

- Village
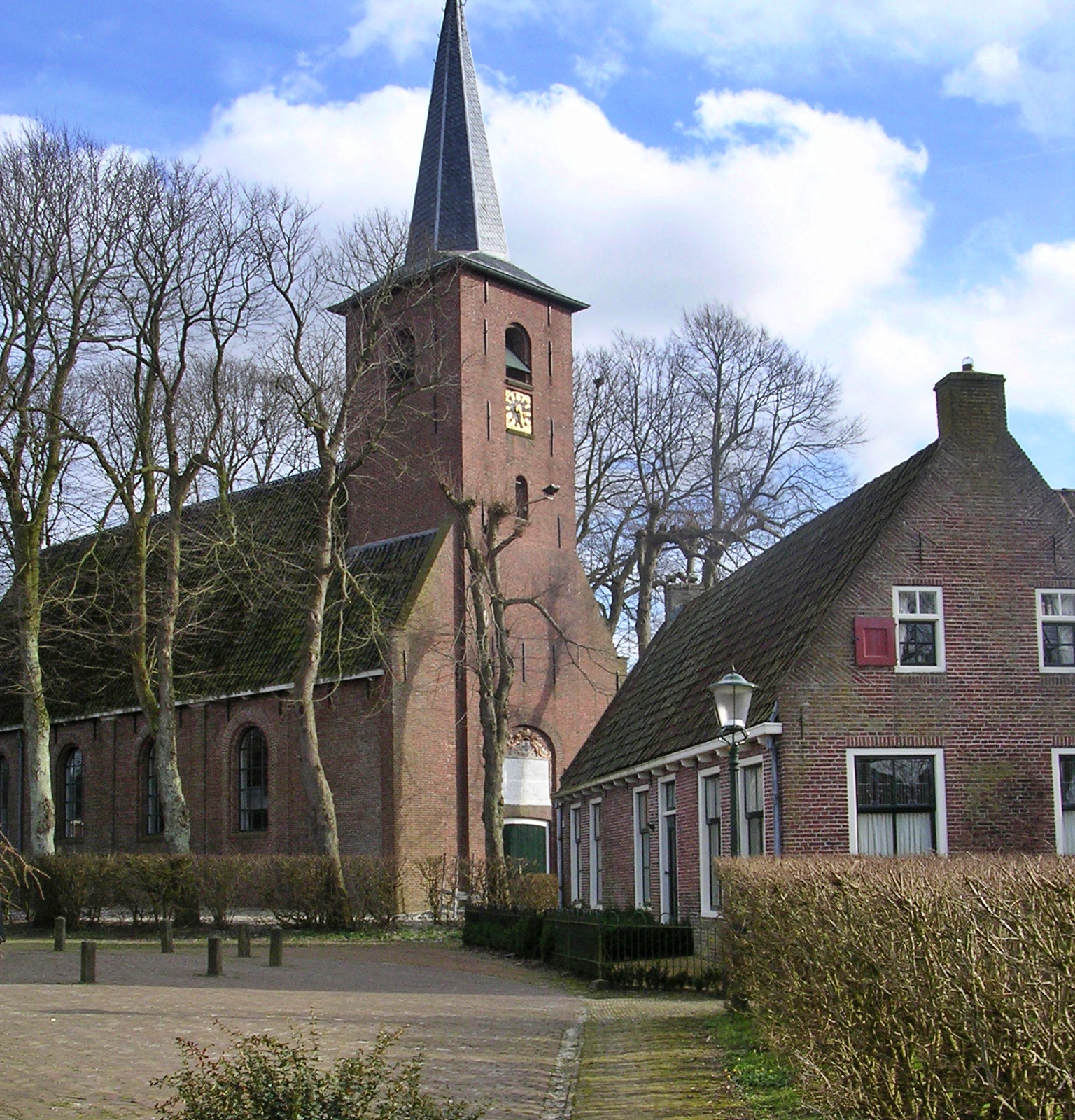
- Mitselwier church

- Flag Coat of arms

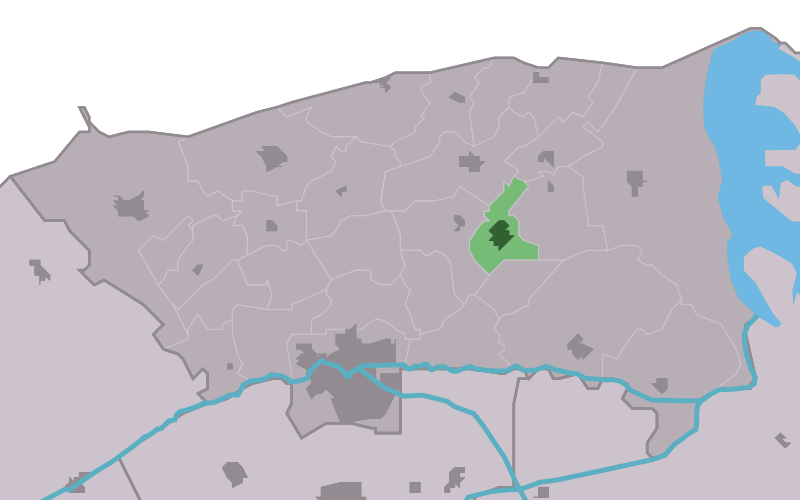
- Location in the former Dongeradeel municipality

- Location in the Netherlands Mitselwier (Netherlands)
- Country: Netherlands
- Province: Friesland
- Municipality: Noardeast-Fryslân

Area
  - Total: 12.15 km^{2} (4.69 sq mi)
- Elevation: 0.4 m (1.3 ft)

Population (2021)
  - Total: 1,420
  - Density: 117/km^{2} (303/sq mi)
- Time zone: UTC+1 (CET)
  - Summer (DST): UTC+2 (CEST)
- Postal code: 9123
- Dialing code: 0519
- Website: Official

Mitselwier (Dutch: Metslawier) is a village in Noardeast-Fryslân in the province of Friesland, the Netherlands. It had a population of around 908 in January 2017. Before 2019, the village was part of the Dongeradeel municipality.

The De Ropta windmill is located near the village.

== History ==
The village was first mentioned in 1417 as "tho Mitzlawere", and means terp of Metsila. Mitselwier is a terp (artificial living mound) village which developed before Christ. The Dutch Reformed church was built in 1776 as a replacement of a medieval church.

In 1840, Mitselwier was home to 491 people. The town hall is a former inn which was built in 1876. It served as town hall from 1909 until 1984. Jaersma State was a stins which dated from at least 1417. It was demolished in 1771, and later the terp around Jaersma State was excavated. The grist mill De Ropta was built in 1836 and 1971. It is no longer in active service.

The village's official name was changed from Metslawier to Mitselwier in 2023.

== Notable inhabitants ==
- Balthasar Bekker (1634–1698)
