= Bosnić =

Bosnić (Serbian: Боснић) is a South Slavic surname, derived from the toponym Bosna (Bosnia). It may refer to:

- Bilal Bosnić (born 1972), Bosnian Islamist
- Vedran Bosnić (born 1976), Bosnian basketball player
- Milka Bosnić, Yugoslav Partisan, youngest recipient of the Order of the People's Hero, only 15 when killed during the war
- Davorka Bosnić, Serbian musician, member of Odjila
- Želimir Bosnić, Croatian politician, former prefect of Dubrovnik-Neretva

== See also ==
- Bosnich
