= Jovan Nikolić (writer) =

Serbian Romani writer (born 1955)

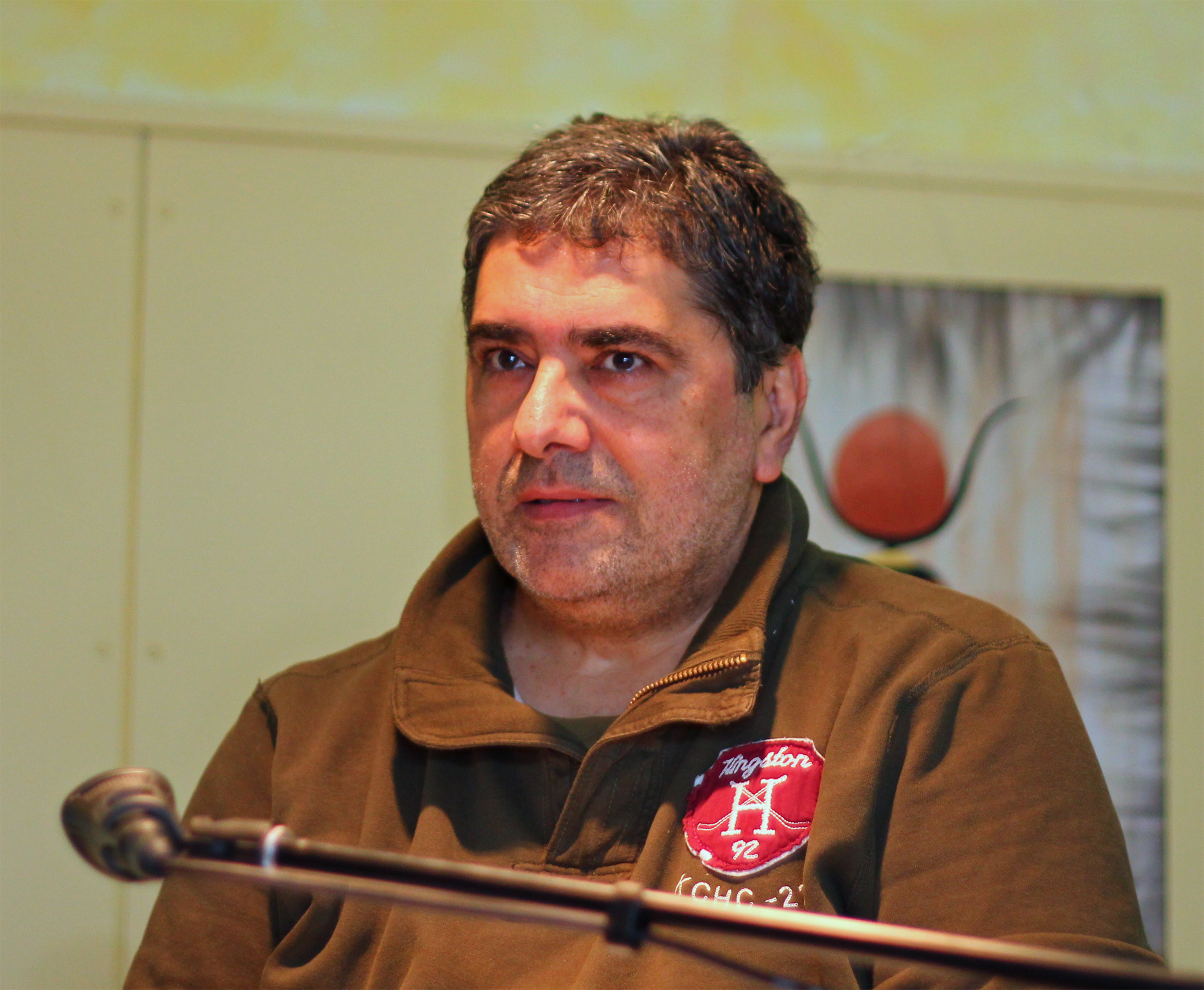
Jovan Nikolić

Jovan Nikolić (Serbian: Јован Николић; born 1955) is a Serbian Romani writer, currently resident in Germany. He is best known in Germany for Bela vrana, crno jagnje ("White Crow, Black Sheep") published in German translation by Bärbel Schulte as Weißer Rabe, schwarzes Lamm.

His parents moved around Yugoslavia, following his father's work as a musician, until returning at the age of 12 to the family's home town of Čačak. Nikolić returned to Belgrade in his 20s to work as performer and singer at nightclubs and freelance journalist. Nikolić moved to Germany following the NATO bombing of Serbia.

== Works ==
=== Novels ===
- Gost niotkuda (A Guest from Nowhere, in Serbian and Roma language, 1982)
- Đurđevdan (St George's Day, 1987)
- Neću da se rodim (I Don’t Want to Be Born, 1991)
- Oči pokojnog jagnjeta (The Eyes of the Late Lamb, 1993)
- Telo i okolina (Body and Environment, 1994)
- Mala noćna muzika (A Little Night Music, 1998)
- Soba s točkom (The Room with a Wheel, 2004, German edition, 2011 in Serbian).
- Bela vrana, crno jagnje (White Crow, Black Sheep) 2003

=== Song lyrics and poetry ===
He has written lyrics for Radomir Mihailović a.k.a. "Točak" and the groups Generacija 5, Zabranjeno pušenje and the romani band Ođila. His lyric Bubamara was featured in the film Black Cat, White Cat of Emir Kusturica.
