= Šipanska Luka =

- Village
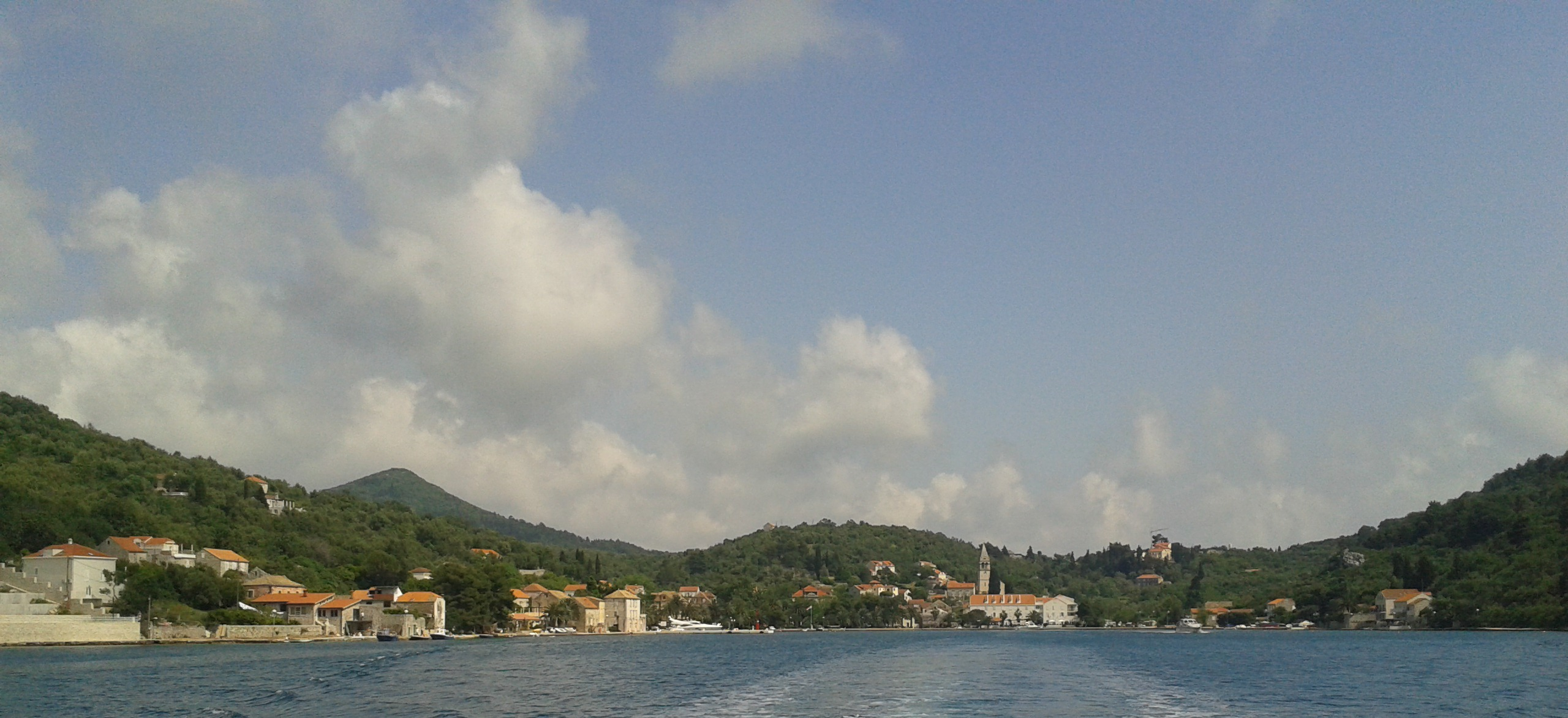

- Location within Croatia
- Coordinates: 42.7423613°N 17.7868714°E
- Country: Croatia
- County: Dubrovnik-Neretva County
- Municipality: Dubrovnik

Area
  - Total: 5.1 sq mi (13.3 km^{2})

Population (2021)
  - Total: 254
  - Density: 49.5/sq mi (19.1/km^{2})
- Time zone: UTC+1 (CET)
  - Summer (DST): UTC+2 (CEST)

Šipanska Luka is a village in Croatia, located on the western coast of Šipan which is one of the Elaphiti Islands.

== Demographics ==
According to the 2021 census, its population was 254.
