= Suđurađ =

- Village
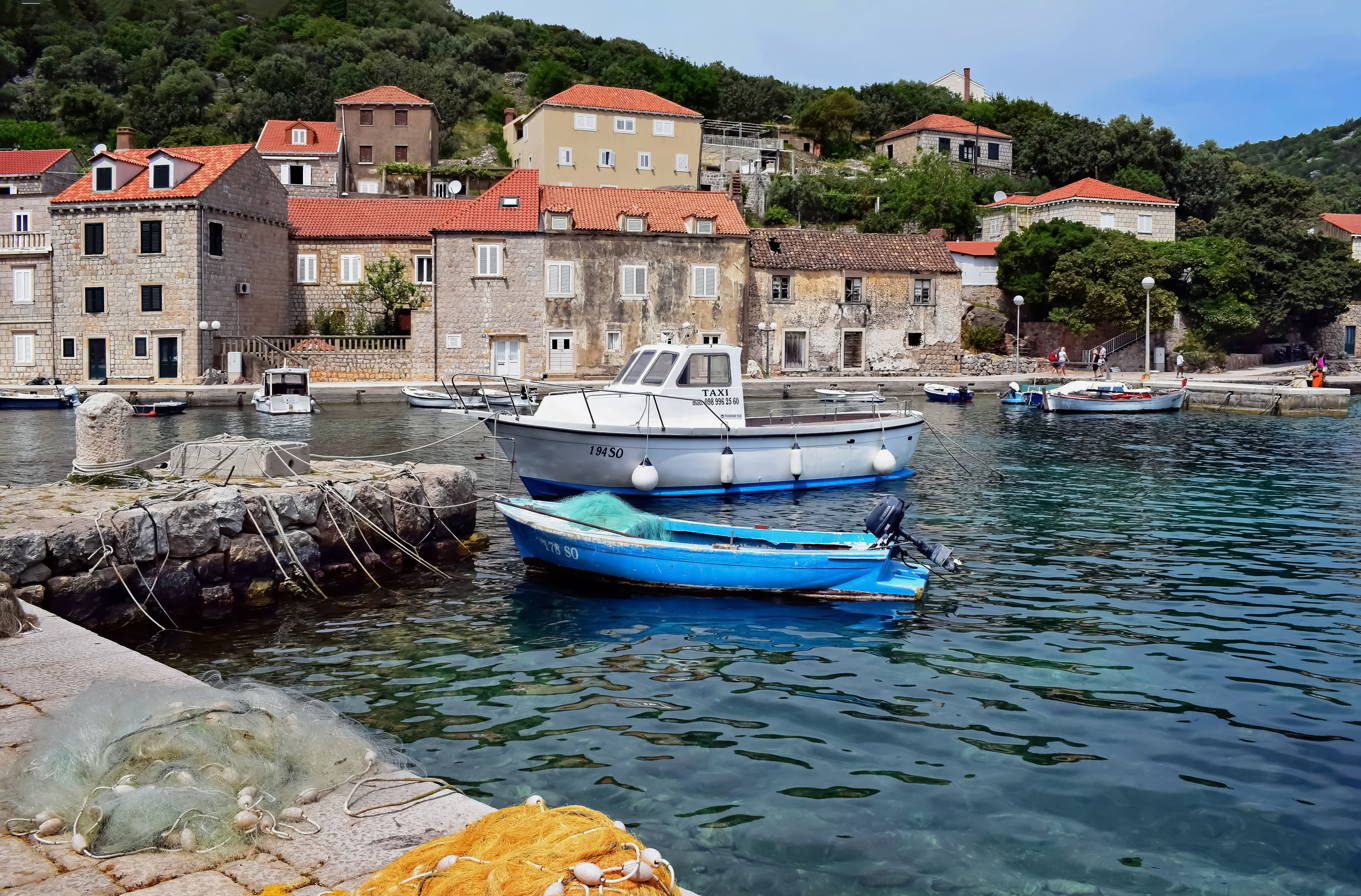
- Image of Suđurađ showing moored boats

- Location within Croatia
- Coordinates: 42.7172878°N 17.8862752°E
- Country: Croatia
- County: Dubrovnik-Neretva County
- Municipality: Dubrovnik

Area
  - Total: 2.8 sq mi (7.2 km^{2})

Population (2021)
  - Total: 222
  - Density: 80/sq mi (31/km^{2})
- Time zone: UTC+1 (CET)
  - Summer (DST): UTC+2 (CEST)

Suđurađ (locally known and pronounced as Suđurac) is a village in Croatia, located on the eastern coast of Šipan which is one of the Elaphiti Islands.

== Demographics ==
According to the 2021 census, its population was 222.
