= Bosnich =

Bosnich is a surname. Notable people with the surname include:

- Brice Bosnich (1936–2015), Australian chemist
- Dean Bosnich (born 1980), Australian rugby league footballer
- Mark Bosnich (born 1972), Australian soccer player and sports pundit

== See also ==
- Bosnić
