= Šipan =

Southern Croatian island in the Dubrovnik-Neretva county

Coordinates: 42.7286°N 17.8758°E

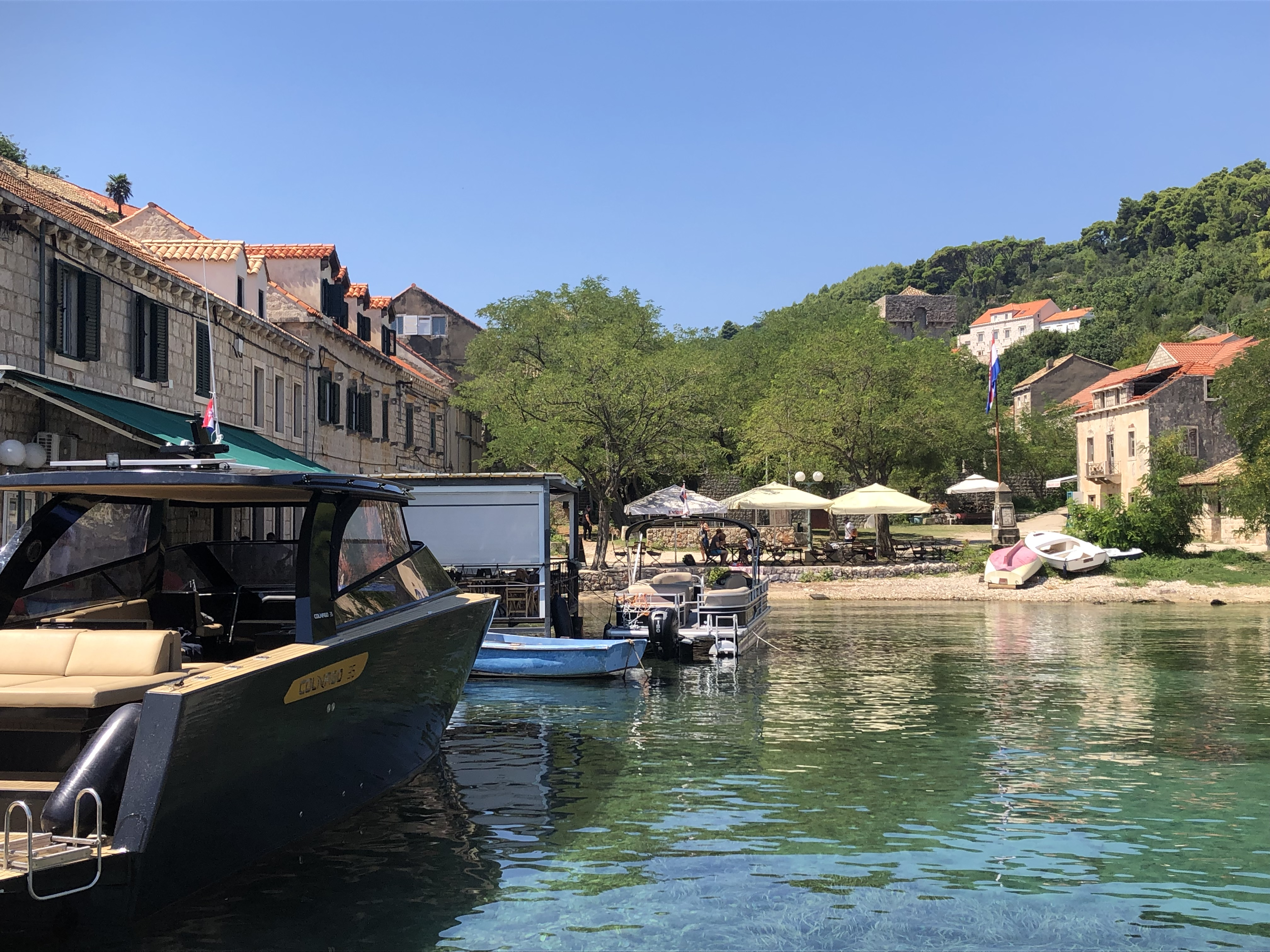
- Image of the center of Suđurađ, Šipan, showing houses and moored boats

- Šipan is one of the Elaphiti Islands

Geography
- Location: Adriatic Sea
- Archipelago: Elaphiti Islands
- Area: 16.22 km^{2} (6.26 sq mi)
- Length: 9.1 km (5.65 mi)
- Width: 2.6 km (1.62 mi)
- Highest elevation: 243 m (797 ft)
- Highest point: Velji Vrh

Administration
- Croatia
- County: Dubrovnik-Neretva

Demographics
- Population: ▲476 (2021)
- Pop. density: 29.34/km^{2} (75.99/sq mi)

Šipan (pronounced [ʃǐpan]) is an island located in southern Croatia and part of the city of Dubrovnik, the capital of the Dubrovnik-Neretva County. It is located 17 km (11 mi) northwest of Dubrovnik, and is separated from the mainland coast by the Koločep Channel, which has an area of 16.22 km^{2} (6.3 sq mi). The island is 9.1 km (5.7 mi) in length, and up to 2.6 km (1.6 mi) in width. It is a part of the Elaphiti Islands, and is the largest island in the archipelago. The name of the archipelago comes from the Ancient Greek word for deer (Greek: ἔλαφος, romanized: elaphos), which—according to Pliny the Elder—used to inhabit the Elaphiti Islands in large numbers.

Šipan's population was 476 as of 2021, an increase from the 416 people in 2011. Its highest point, the Velji Vrh, lies at 243 m (797 ft) above sea level, and is located in the northwestern part of the island. The Velji Vrh is one of two limestone crests on the island, the other being the Kameni Luk, located in the southeast. Fruits such as oranges and other citrus are cultivated on the island. It holds the Guinness World Record for the most olive trees relative to an island's size and population.

Šipan can be reached by ferries from Dubrovnik, which also go to Lopud and Koločep, locally known as Kalamota, the latter of which is the southernmost inhabited island in Croatia. The ports of Suđurađ and Šipanska Luka make up the only two inhabited towns on the island.

== History ==
There are some remnants from the Illyrian era and villae rusticae from the Roman era on the island. The island's name Tauris, known to be mentioned in the 16th century, led old writers from Dubrovnik, as well as some contemporary historians, to assume that the Battle of Tauris took place in 47 BC near Šipan, and not Šćedro. In historical sources, the island is first mentioned under the name Juppana and Italianized Giuppana in the 13th century. The first known mention under the Croatian name of Šipan is from 1371.

In the 16th and 17th century, the island was a site of belief in the living dead, which led some to mutilate corpses.

During the Napoleonic Wars and the Adriatic campaign of 1807–1814, the island was named Giuppana by the British Navy. British Admiral Thomas Fremantle ordered to invade the island, together with other Croatian islands, to prevent their use by the French. On 7 October 1807, sixth-rate HMS Porcupine, under the command of Captain Henry Duncan, chased the Italian gunboat Safo to the island. Boats from Porcupine then entered the harbour and seized the gunboat. On 18 June 1813, the island was again taken during the Siege of Ragusa by the British, after they forced the surrender of a French garrison on the island.

The beginning of the connection between Šipan and Dubrovnik was established by the noble Sagroević-Stjepović-Krivonosović-Skočibuha family, at around the 15th century. Although some associate their origin with Herzegovina, according to other sources, that surname is mentioned in Šipan before the fall of Bosnia under Turkish rule in 1463. Two brothers, Antun and Stijepo Sagroević-Krivonosović, were mentioned at the beginning of the 16th century, and the names of their nine descendants were also recorded. All of them were connected to seafaring and sailed throughout the Mediterranean and to the coasts of England and the Netherlands. Due to frequent conflicts with pirates and other dangers, such a life was risky and took victims. Only two sons survived, Vice Stjepović-Skočibuha, who would become the most respected representative of the merchant class of his time, and Marin, a priest who spent his life in Naples and Dubrovnik. The island became a part of the Republic of Ragusa in 1426.

The island was a site of fighting against the forces of Nazi Germany, with the island being liberated by Yugoslav Partisan forces from Mljet and Ston on 11 September 1944. The remains of Dr. Niko Koprivica—mayor of Dubrovnik accused of collaborating with the Ustaše—were located in Šipan. He was killed during the Daksa massacre in World War II.

During the Croatian War of Independence, more specifically the Siege of Dubrovnik, a fort located on the Velji Vrh was used as a defence against the Yugoslav People's Army. The fort was previously used by the Austro-Hungarian Empire, Nazi Germany, and the Yugoslav Partisans. As such, the island was a site of combat during the siege. A ship manned by six Croatian National Guard commandos was also intercepted off the island and sunk by the Yugoslav Navy, killing 3 Argentinian volunteers and 2 Croatian soldiers. As a result of the war, there are still minefields located on the island today.

== Economy ==
Coat of arms of the island of Šipan

Šipan flourished during the Republic of Ragusa when some of the most common activities were shipbuilding, seamanship, olive cultivation, fishing, and viticulture. Though, after a great earthquake, and a fire that destroyed Dubrovnik in the 17th century, the economy of the island began to decline as the island relied heavily on Dubrovnik. The worst economic decline of the island happened during The Great Depression, accompanied by strong emigration. With major investments in the last ten years, the economy of the island is improving and the island is once again experiencing revitalisation, though the island is still economically dependent on Dubrovnik.

For hundreds of years, Šipan's fishing culture was strong, with it having had a large population of fishermen living on the island. As such, Šipan became famous for its fishing culture. These fishermen preferred fishing european pilchards and tuna. These fishermen are also important in the island's economy. The island also brings in large income from tourism, even though Šipan did not have any tourist attraction until 1980. In addition, the island is home to a film school, which has been operating for 20 years.

== Geography and architecture ==
Šipan's highest point, named the Velji Vrh (lit. Great peak), lies at 243 m (797 ft) above mean sea level, and is located in the northwestern part of the island. The 2nd highest point on the island, the Kameni Luk, located in the southeast, is slightly smaller than the Velji Vrh, with both hills being limestone crests. On the island, there are multiple plants which are cultivated, such as olives, figs, almonds, carobs, and citrus. Šipan also holds the Guinness World Record for the most olive trees relative to the island's population and size, with the island being noted to have over 300 thousand olive trees.

The island is also famous for its wide variety of palm trees, which are located throughout the island. A well-preserved fresco from before the 11th century of St. John the Baptist is located in a church on the island. The residence of Vice Stjepović-Skočibuha is still intact, with the family playing a major role in the local architecture of Suđurađ.

== Gallery ==
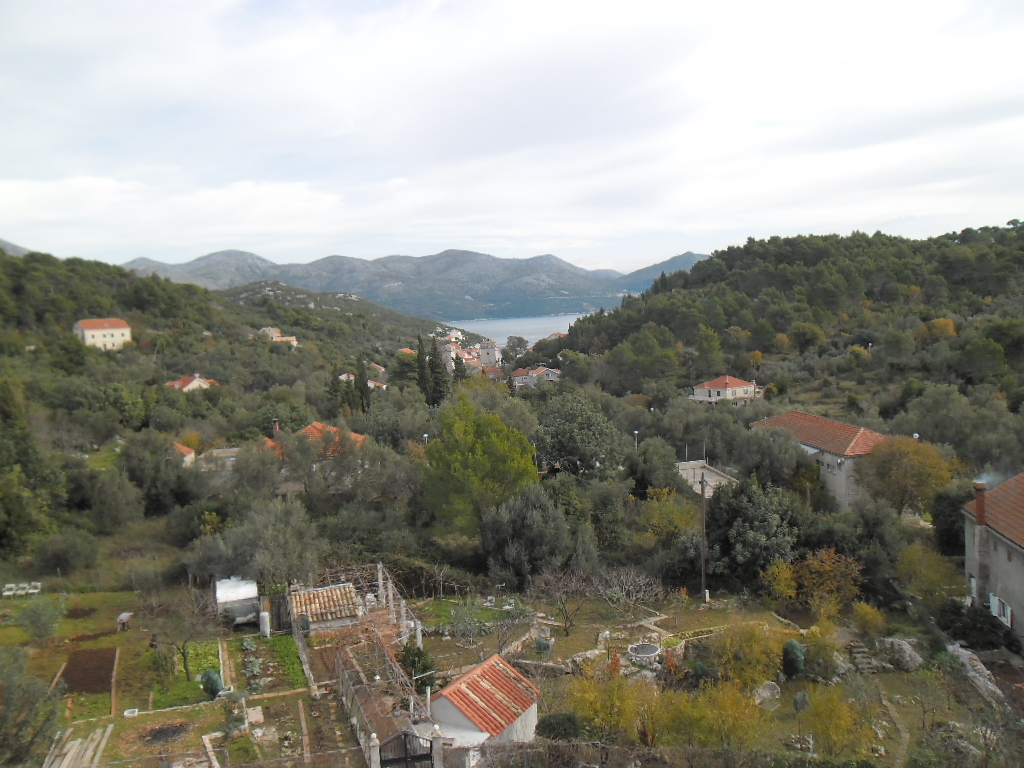
Suđurađ

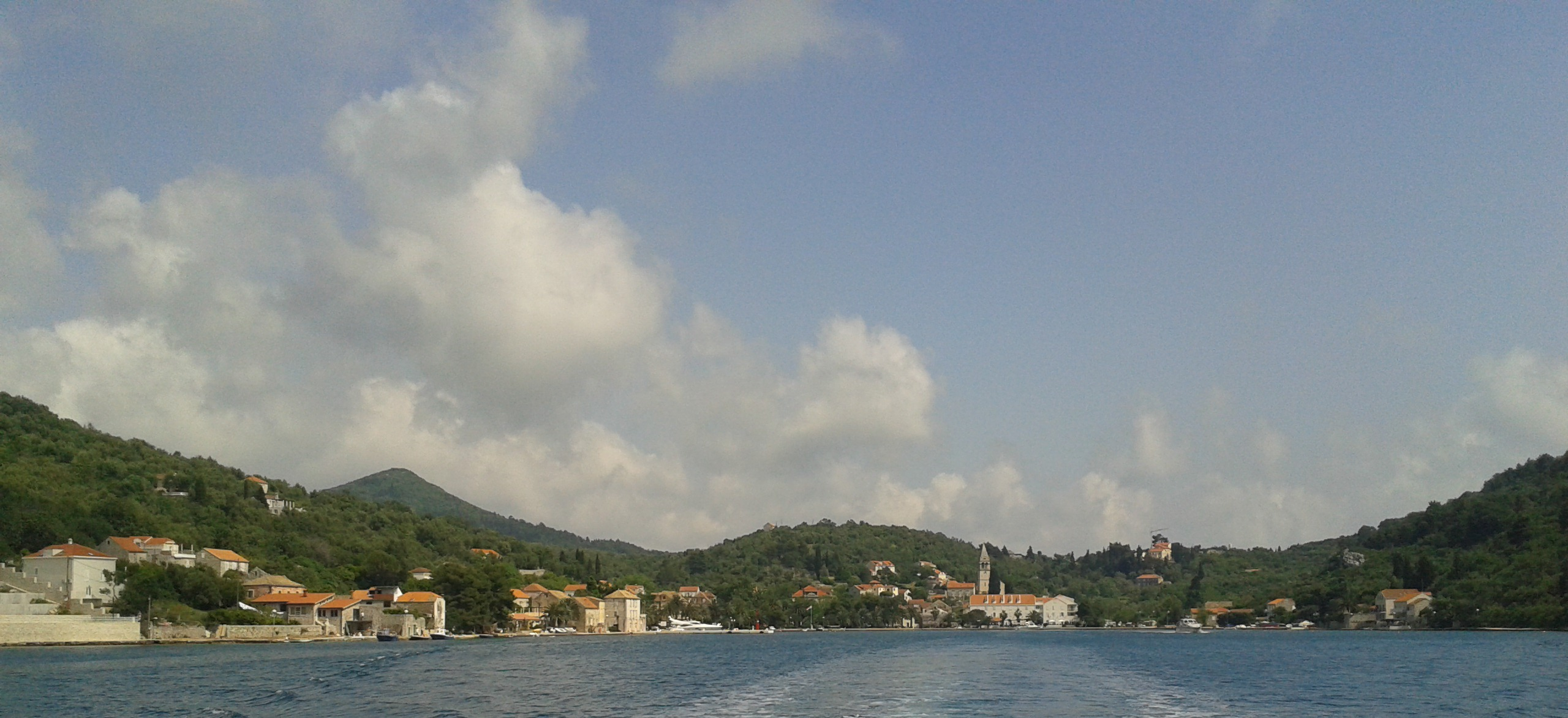
Šipanska Luka

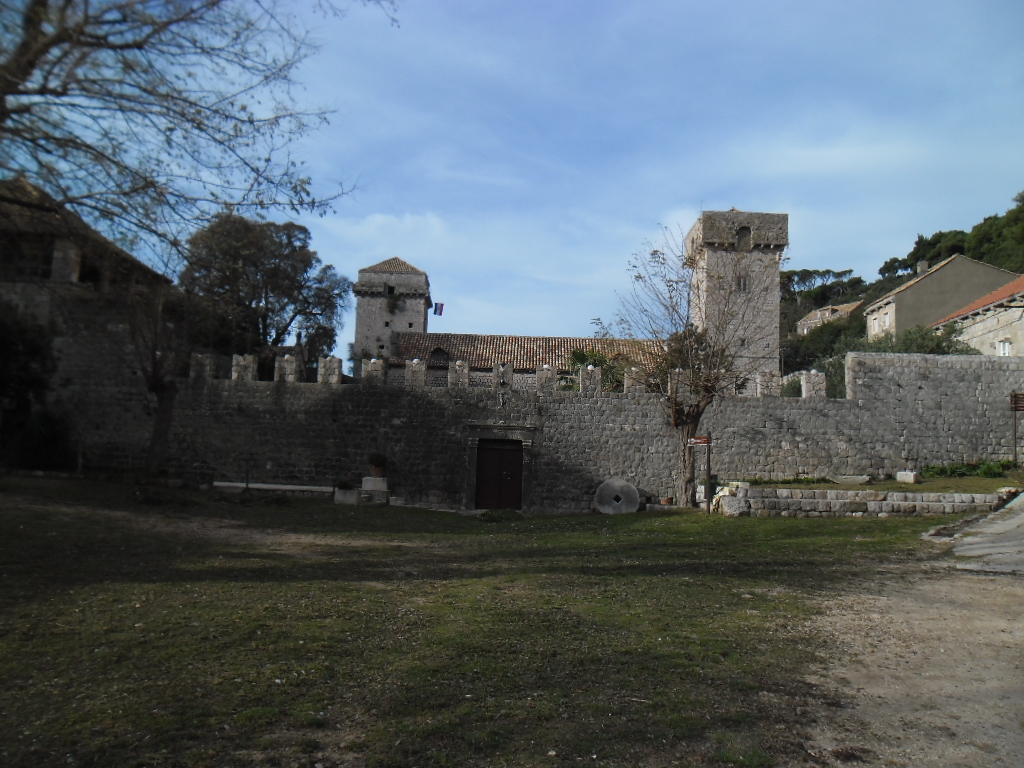
Summer residence of Vice Stjepović-Skočibuha

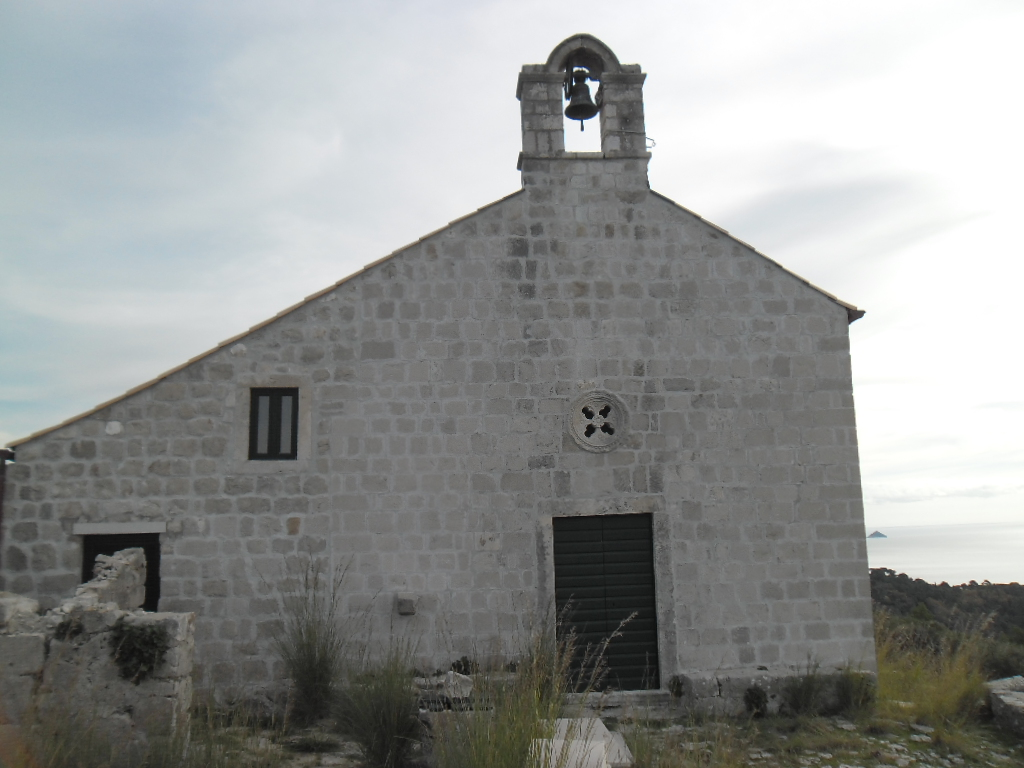
Church on Pakljena

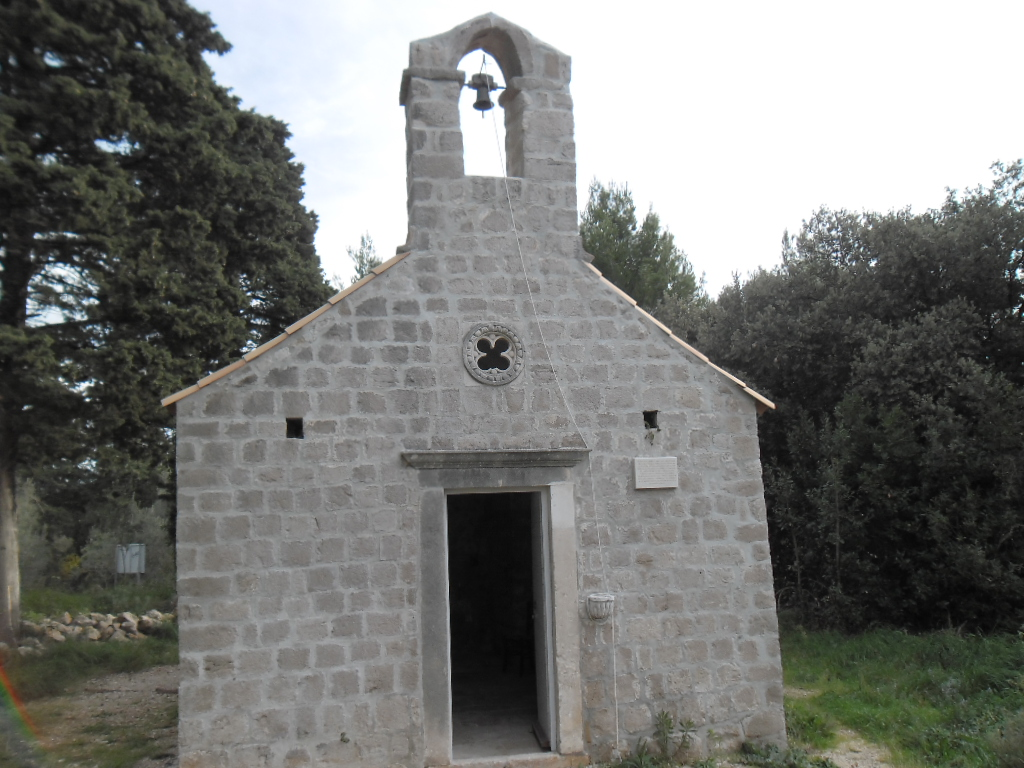
St. Stephen Church in Suđurađ

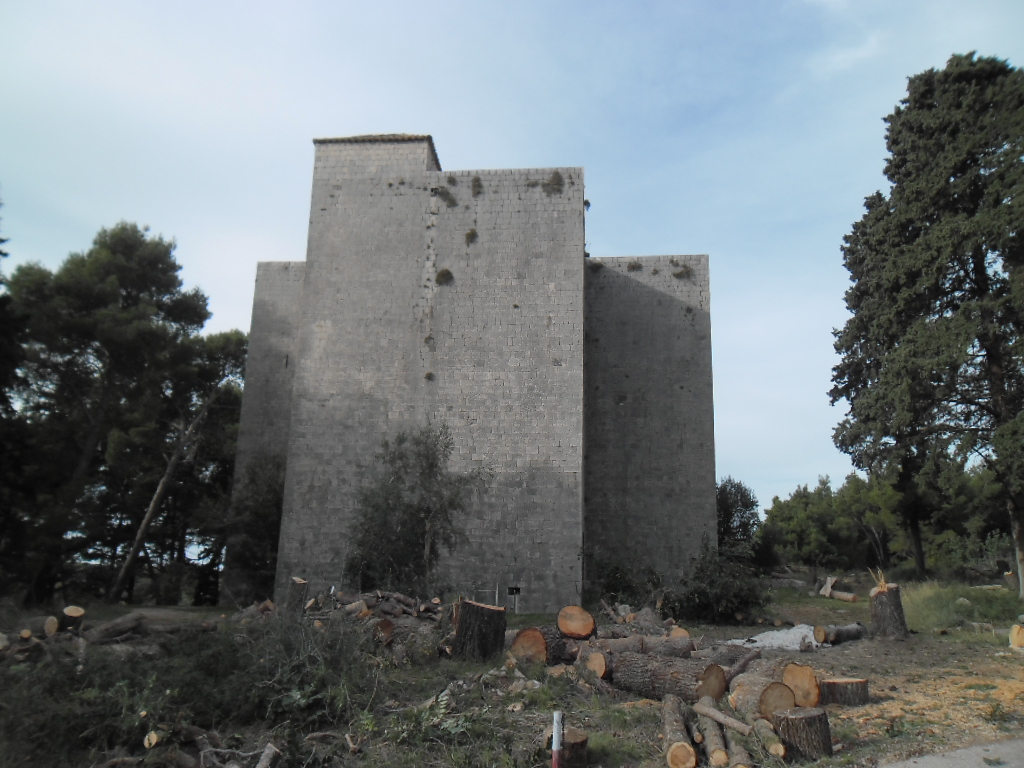
Church in Suđurađ

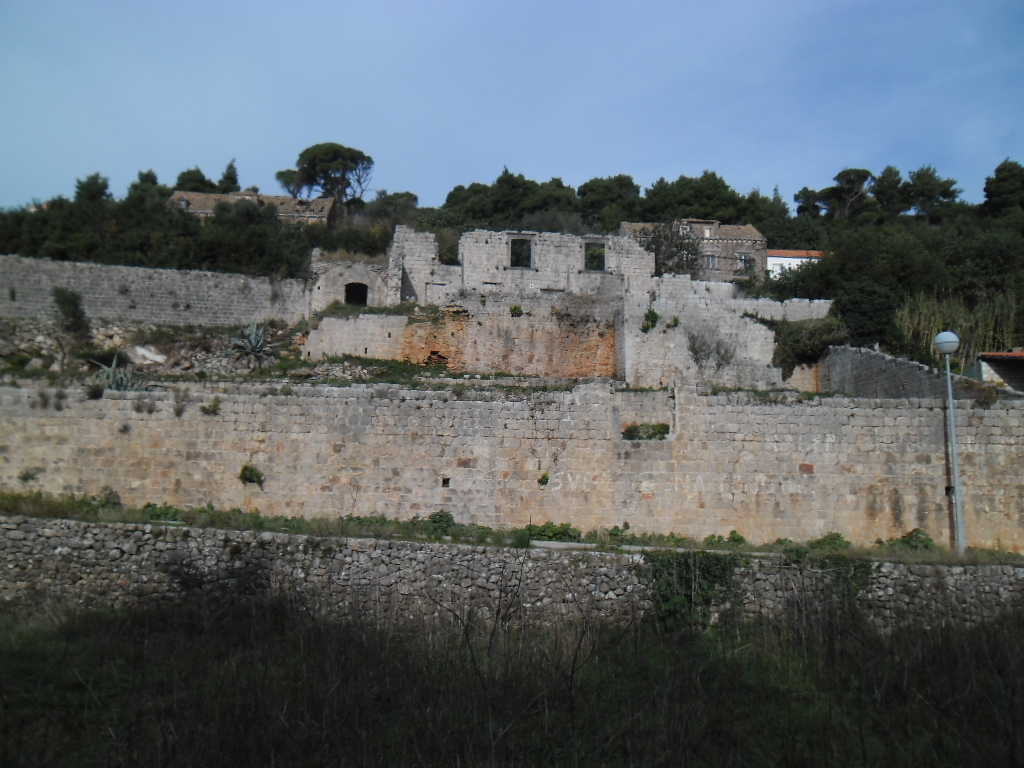
House of Getaldić

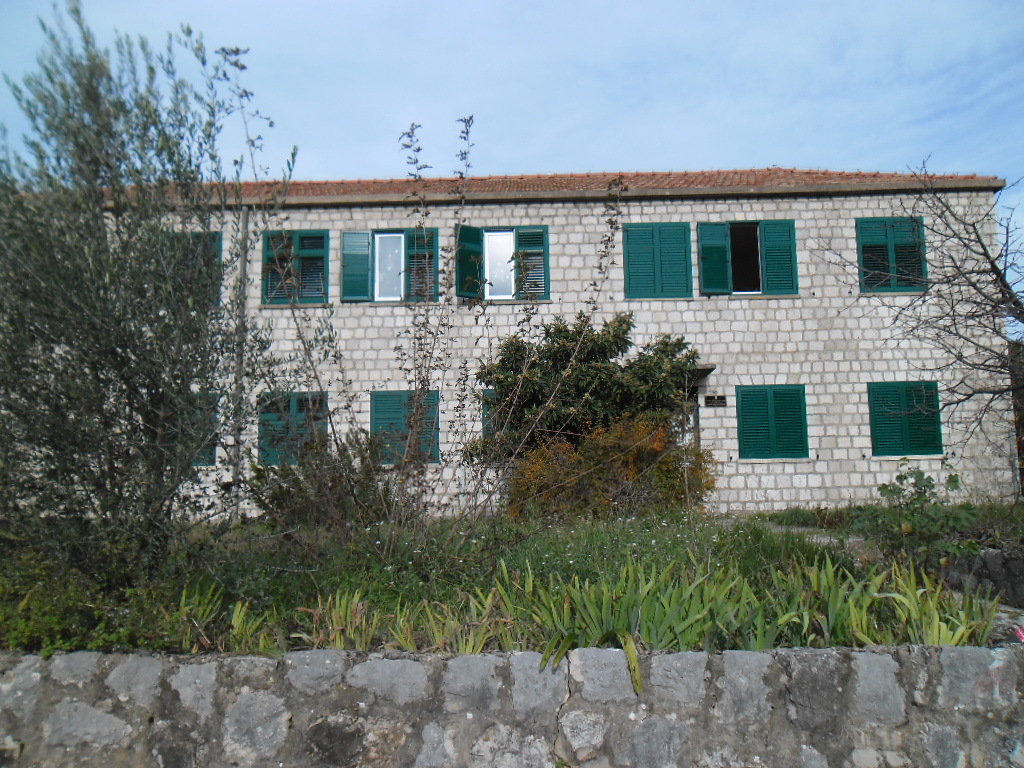
School and library, located in Suđurađ

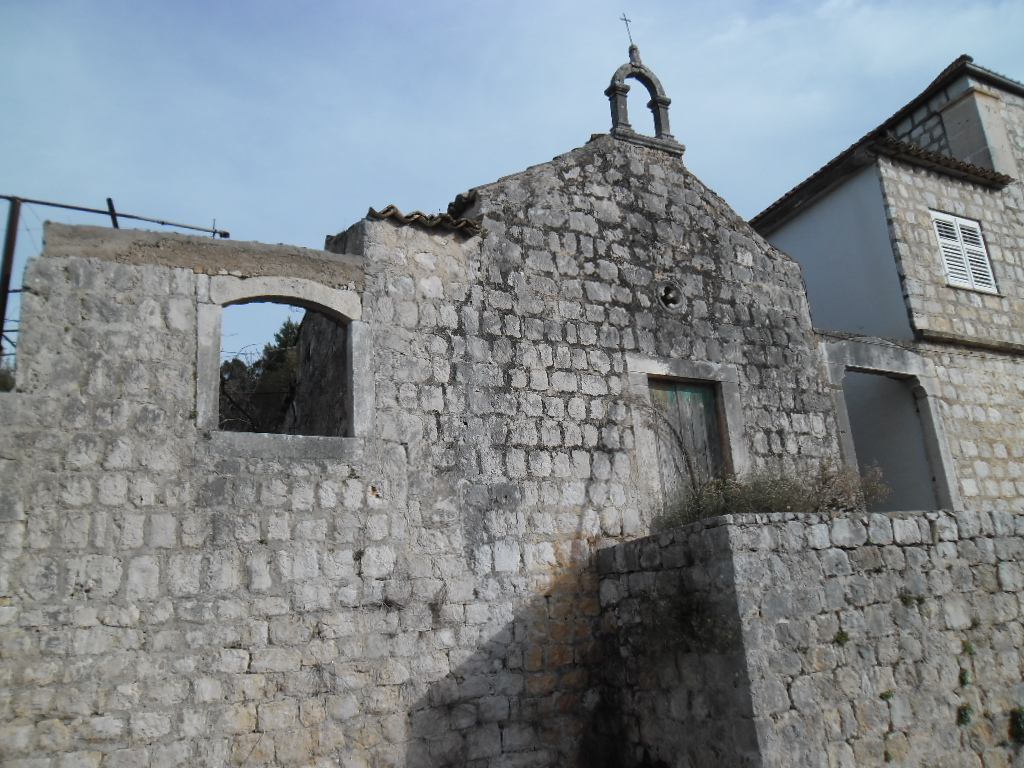
Church

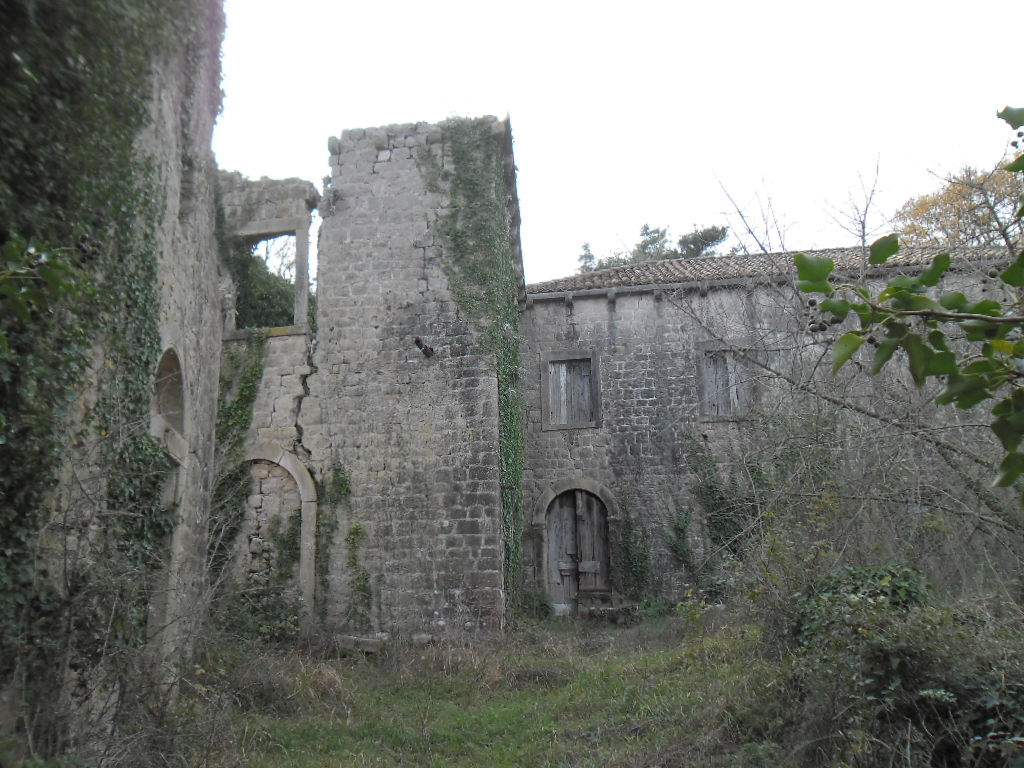
Old noble house

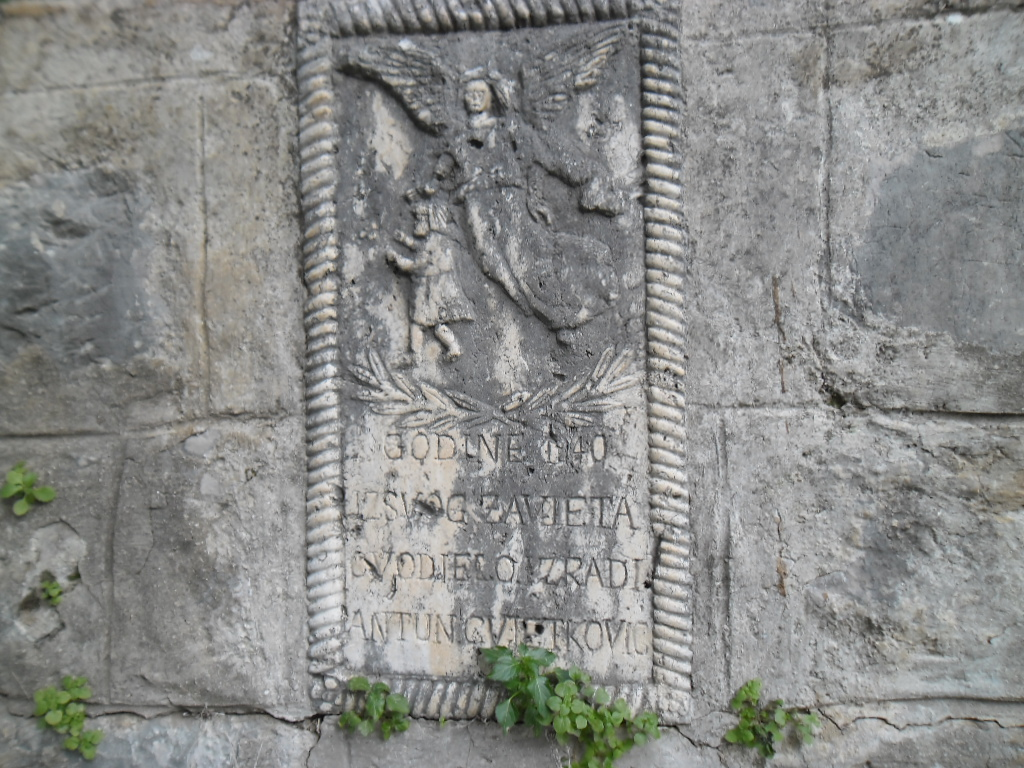
Old monument

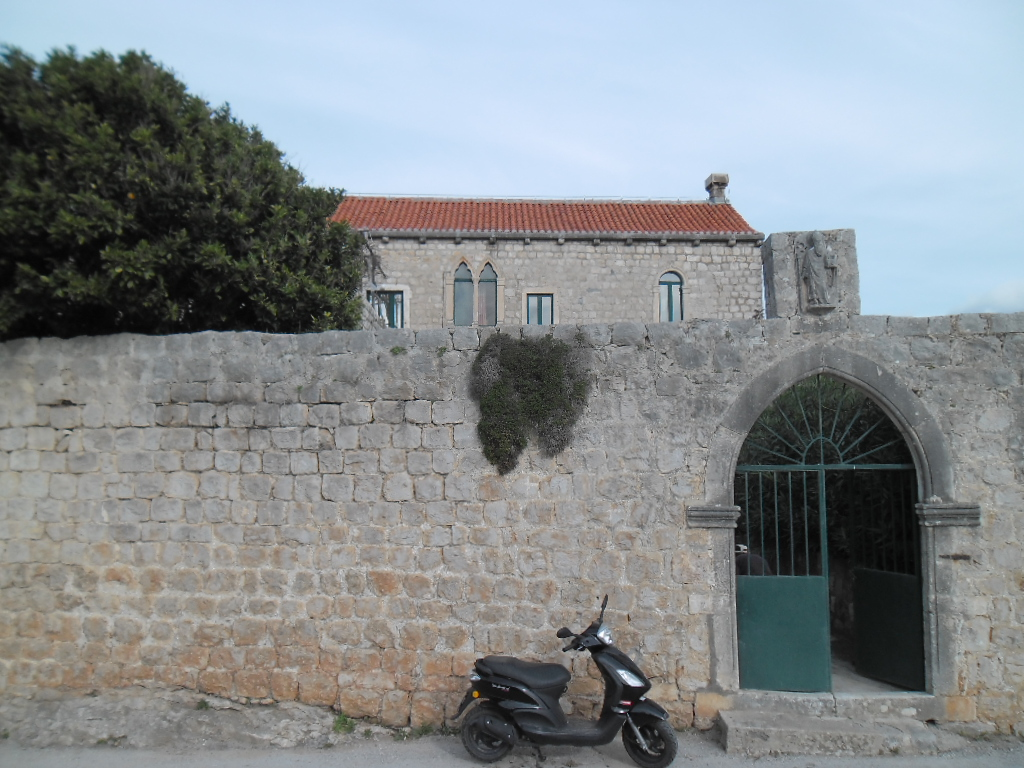
Rector's Palace on Šipan

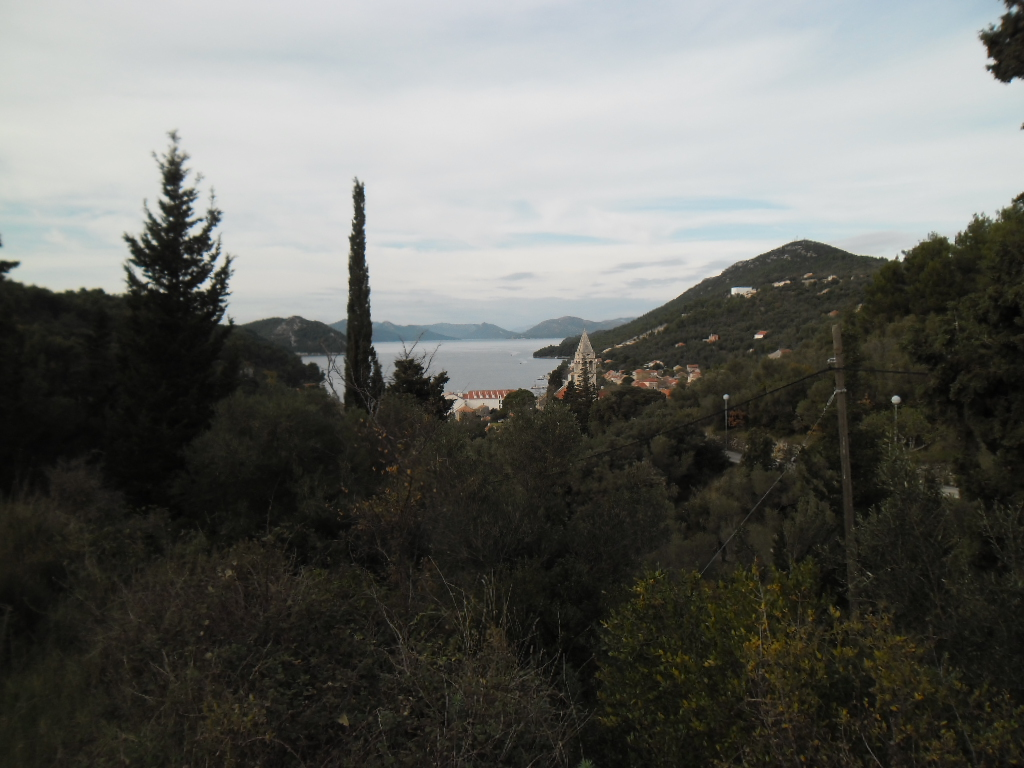
Behind Šipanska Luka

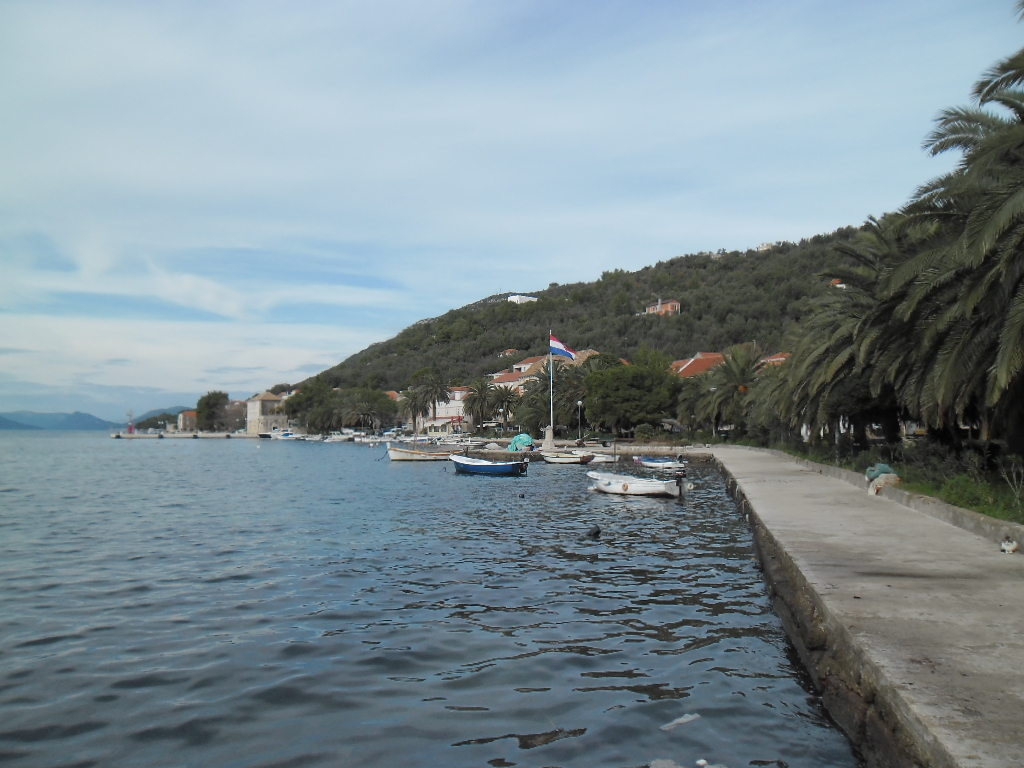
Šipanska Luka coast

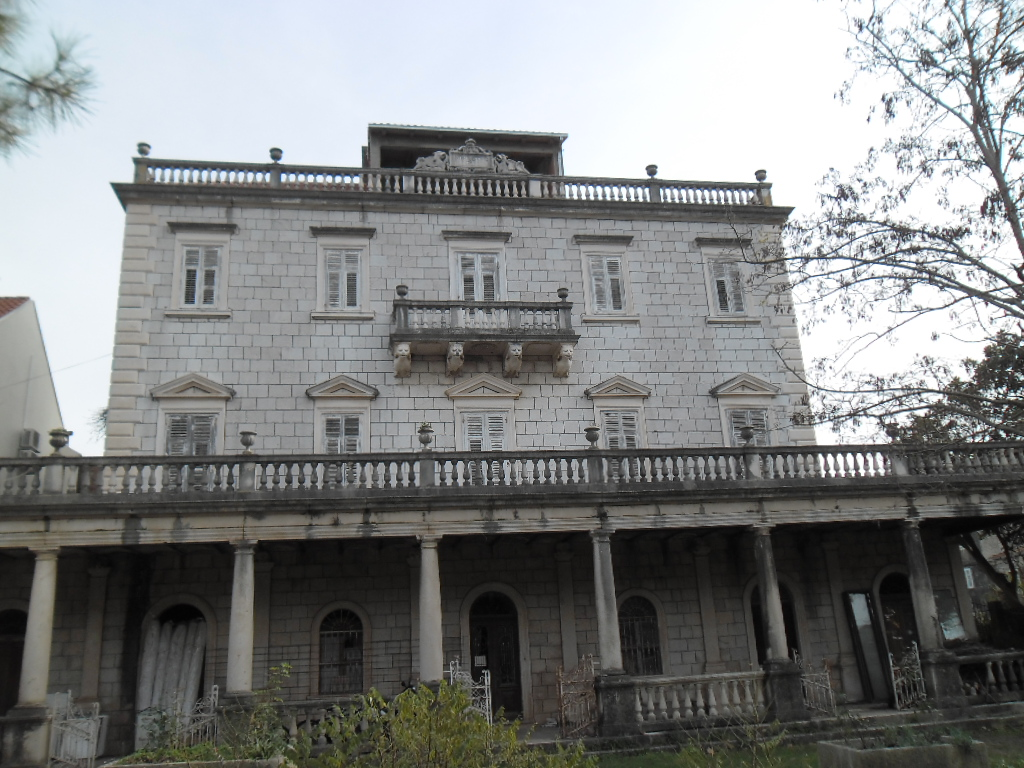
House in Šipanska Luka

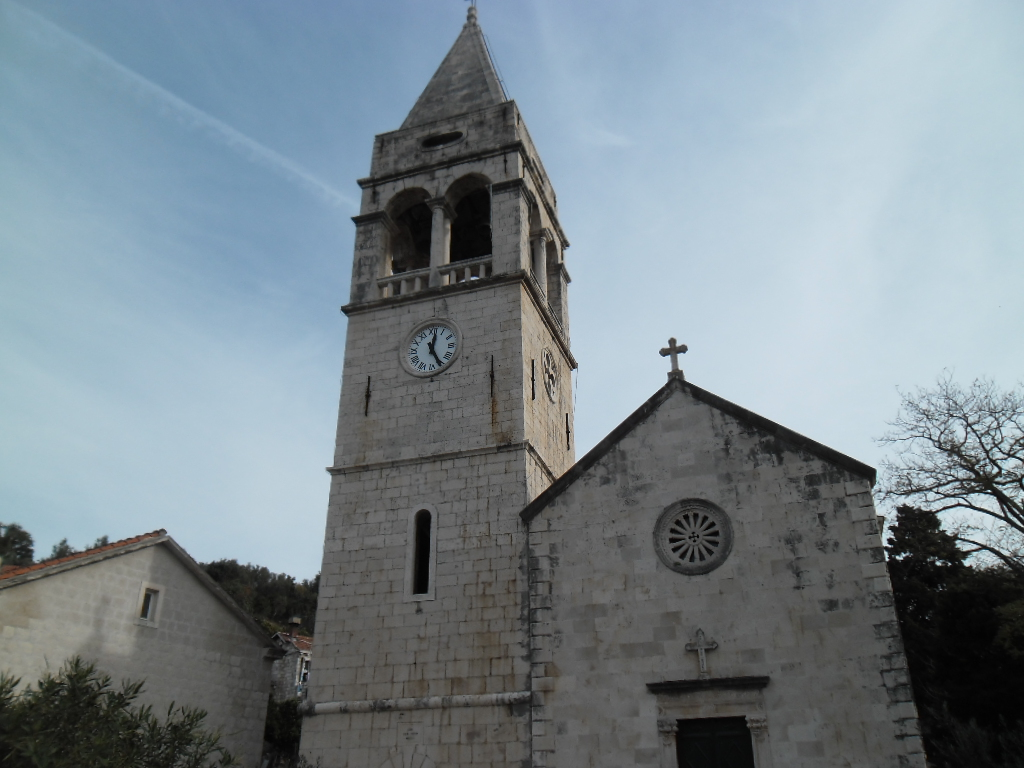
Church in Šipanska Luka

== See also ==
- Suđurađ
- Šipanska Luka
- Lopud
- Koločep
- Elaphiti Islands

== Bibliography ==
- Glamuzina, Martin; Glamuzina, Nikola (1999). "Suvremena geografska problematika otoka Lopuda i Koločepa" [Recent Geographical Issues of the Lopud and Koločep Islands]. Geoadria (in Croatian). 4 (1): 89–100. doi:10.15291/geoadria.152.
- James, William (2002) [reprint of 1827]. The Naval History of Great Britain, Volumes 4–6, 1807–1827. Conway Maritime Press.
- Clowes, William Laird (1997) [1900]. The Royal Navy, A History from the Earliest Times to 1900, Volume V. Chatham Publishing. ISBN 1-86176-014-0.
- Fisković, Igor (1999). "Painting". In Ivan Supičić (ed.). Croatia in the Early Middle Ages: A Cultural Survey. London, Zagreb: Philip Wilson Publishers, AGM, HAZU. pp. 493–512. ISBN 0856674990.
- Vojnović, Lujo (2009). Pad Dubrovnika (1797.-1806.). Fortuna. ISBN 978-953-95981-9-6.
