= Rujnica =

- Village
- Location within Bosnia and Herzegovina
- Coordinates: 44.4830171°N 18.1785982°E
- Country: Bosnia and Herzegovina
- Entity: Federation of Bosnia and Herzegovina
- Canton: Zenica-Doboj
- Municipality: Zavidovići

Area
  - Total: 4.04 sq mi (10.46 km^{2})

Population (2013)
  - Total: 1,248
  - Density: 309.0/sq mi (119.3/km^{2})
- Time zone: UTC+1 (CET)
  - Summer (DST): UTC+2 (CEST)

Rujnica is a village in the municipality of Zavidovići, Bosnia and Herzegovina.Rujnica is a settlement in the municipality of Zavidovići,Bosnia and Herzegovina. The village population was last counted in 2013 at 1,248,and in 2025 not known yet. Rujnica consists of five villages:Kazići,Luke,Jolde,Husići,Tursići. Teh largest,most developed,and most populous is Jolde.Jolde has a local school,a shop,a mosque,a madrasa,a monument,a bus station,etc. Around Rujnica are Ilići Hill and Blizna Mountain (635-685m). The Rujnica River and many streams flow through it. The terrain is hilly and mountainous. The population is 100% muslim.

== graphics ==
According to the 2013 census, its population was 1,248.

Ethnicity in 2013
Ethnicity	Number	Percentage
Bosniaks	1,248	100%
other/undeclared	0	0%
Total	1,248	100%
