= List of prefects of Dubrovnik-Neretva County =

This is a list of prefects of Dubrovnik-Neretva County.

== Prefects of Dubrovnik-Neretva County (1993–present) ==
Croatian Democratic Union (HDZ)
Croatian Social Liberal Party (HSLS)
Social Democratic Party of Croatia (SDP)
Independent List Stipe Gabrić "Jambo" (NLSG)

№	Portrait	Name (Born–Died)	Term of Office		Party
1		Jure Burić (1946–)	4 May 1993	11 May 1998	HDZ
—		Pero Cvjetović (1958–); Acting Prefect	11 May 1998	7 December 1998	HSLS
2		Ivan Šprlje (1947–2007)	7 December 1998	9 June 2005	SDP
3		Ivo Miletić (1954–)	9 June 2005	2 February 2006	HDZ
—		Želimir Bosnić (1960–); Commissioner	2 February 2006	23 May 2006	HDZ
4		Mira Buconić (1943–)	23 May 2006	5 June 2009	NLSG
5		Nikola Dobroslavić (1949–)	5 June 2009	9 June 2025	HDZ
6		Blaž Pezo (1978–)	9 June 2025	Incumbent	HDZ

== See also ==
- Dubrovnik-Neretva County
