= Dubrovnik-Neretva County =

County in southern Croatia

Coordinates: 42°39′13″N 18°05′41″E

Dubrovnik-Neretva County Dubrovačko-neretvanska županija (Croatian)
- County
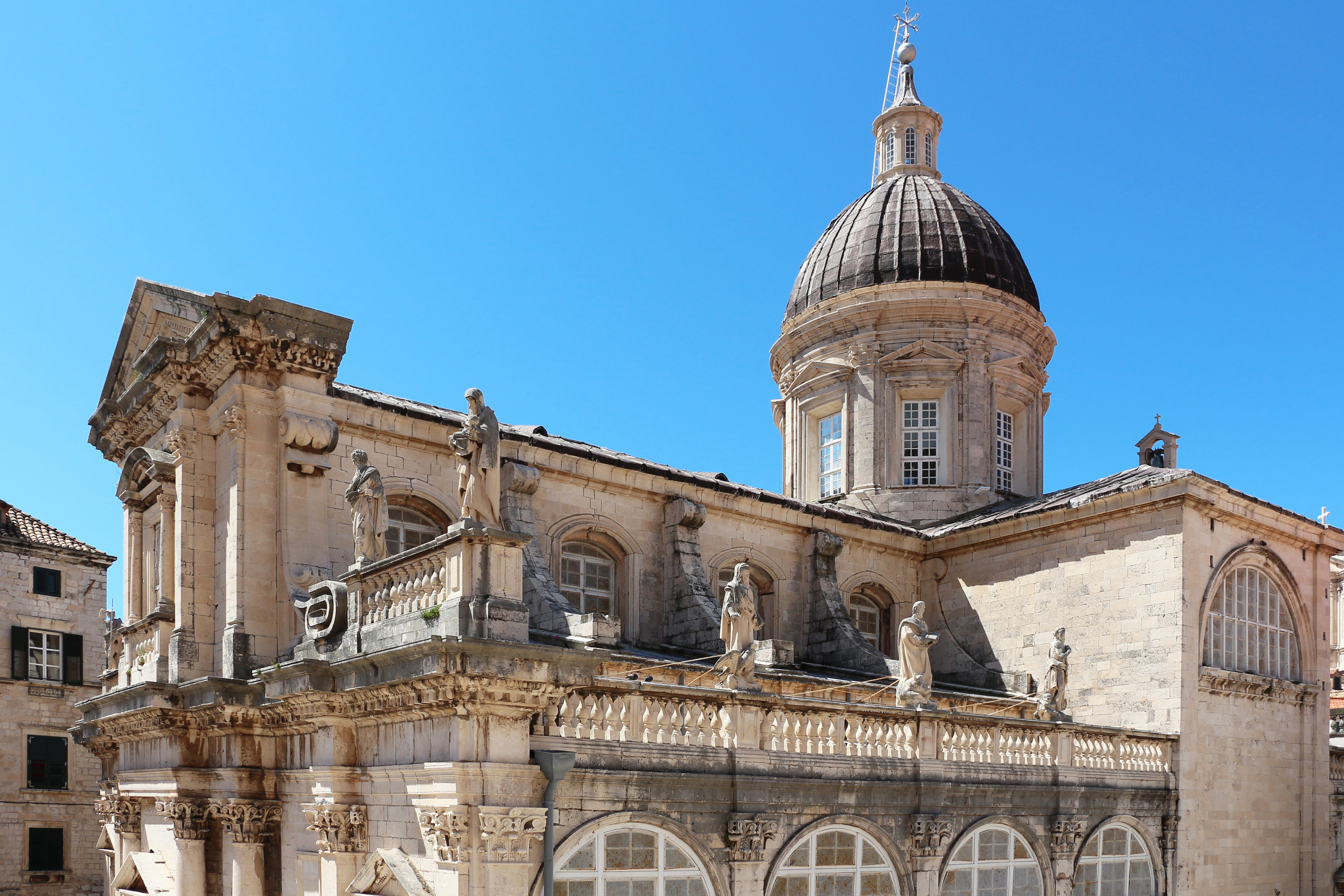
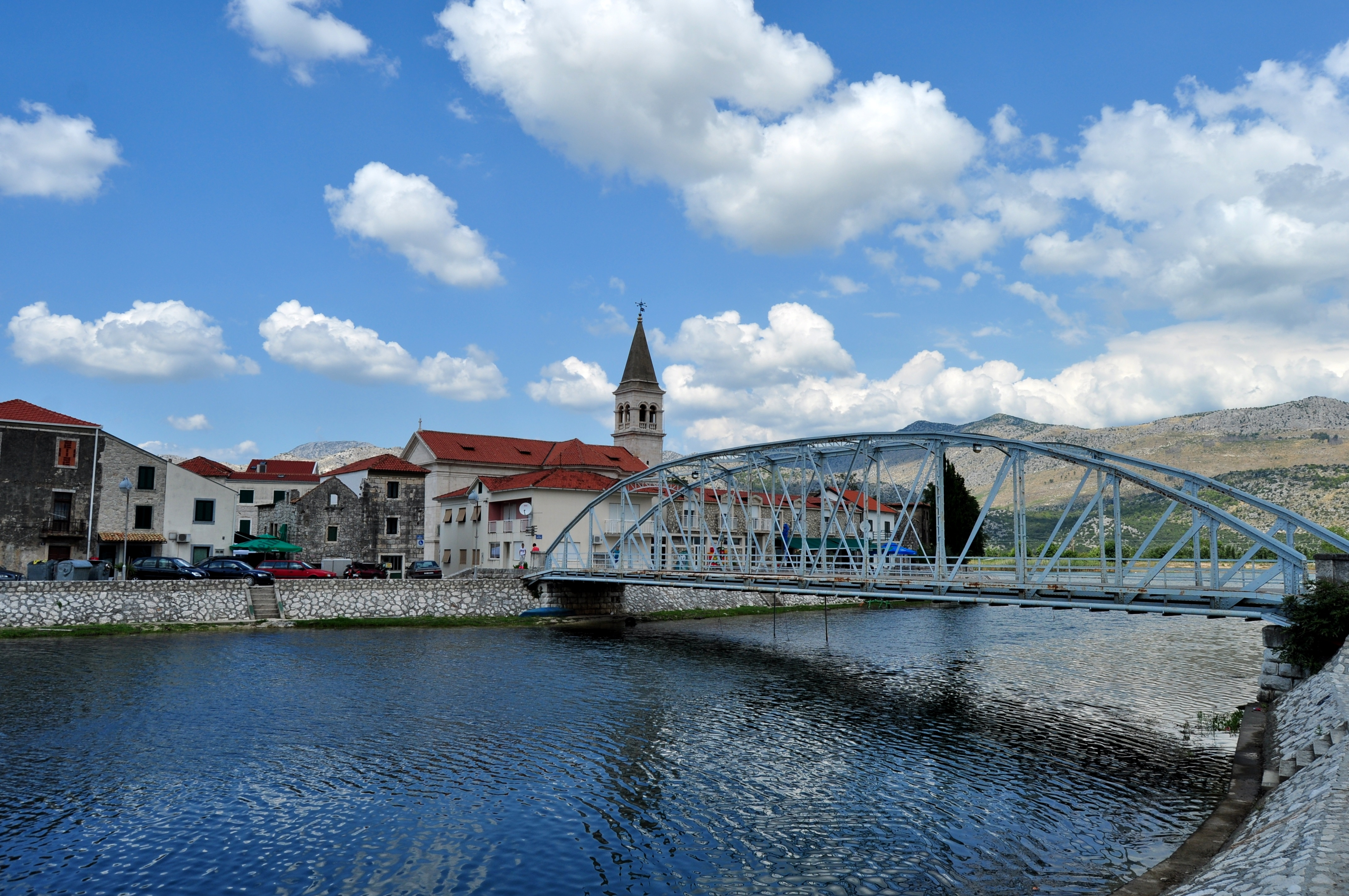
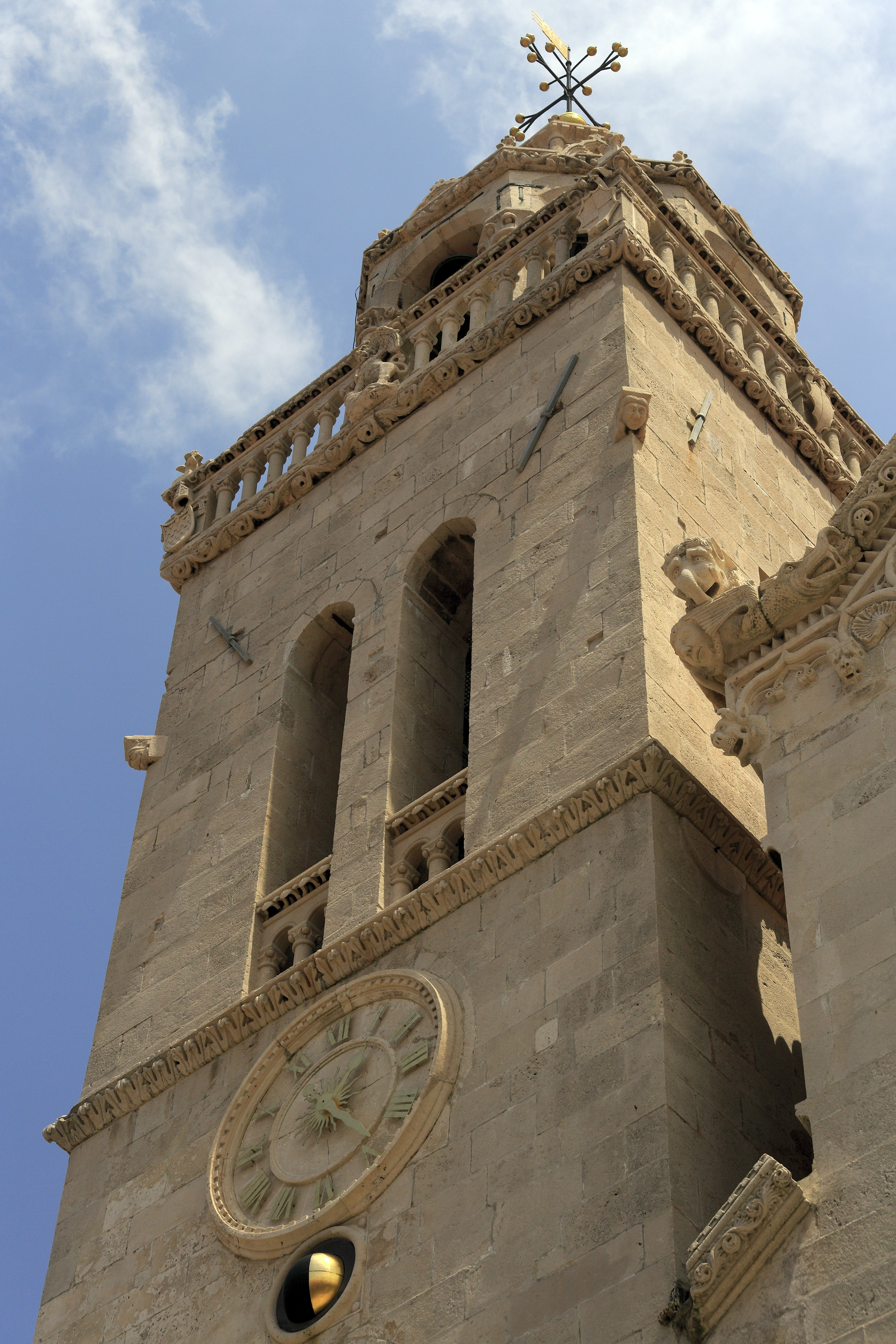
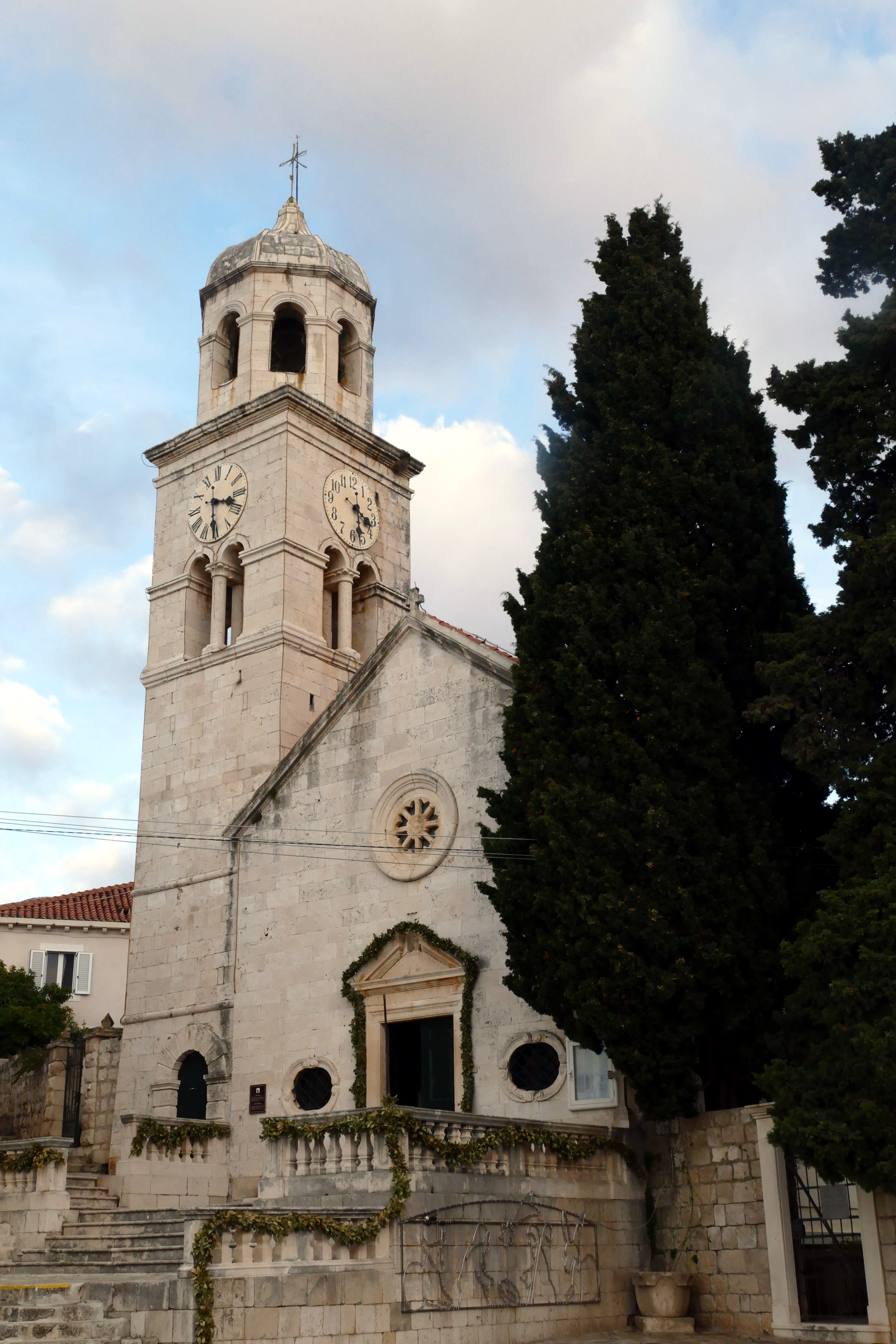
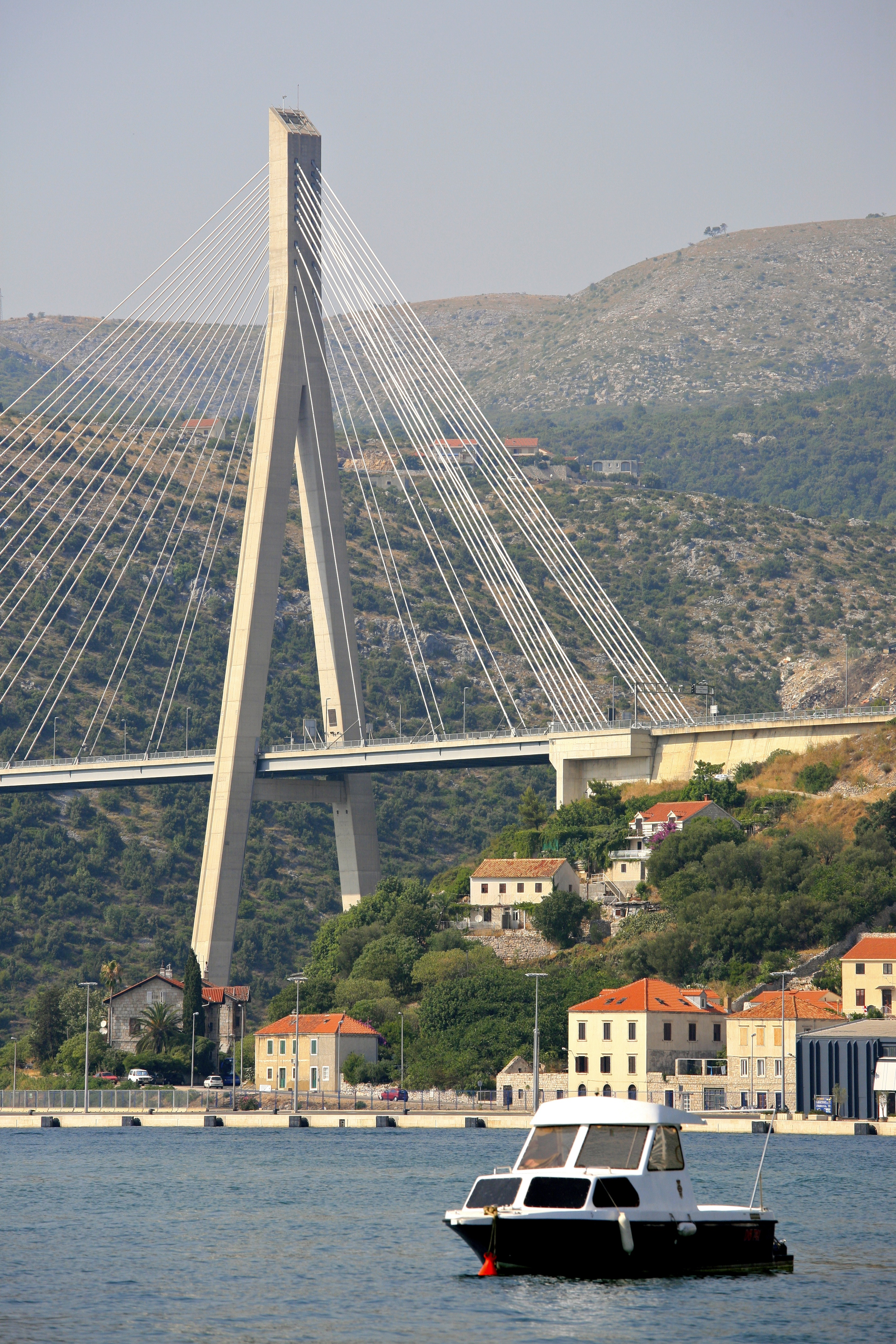
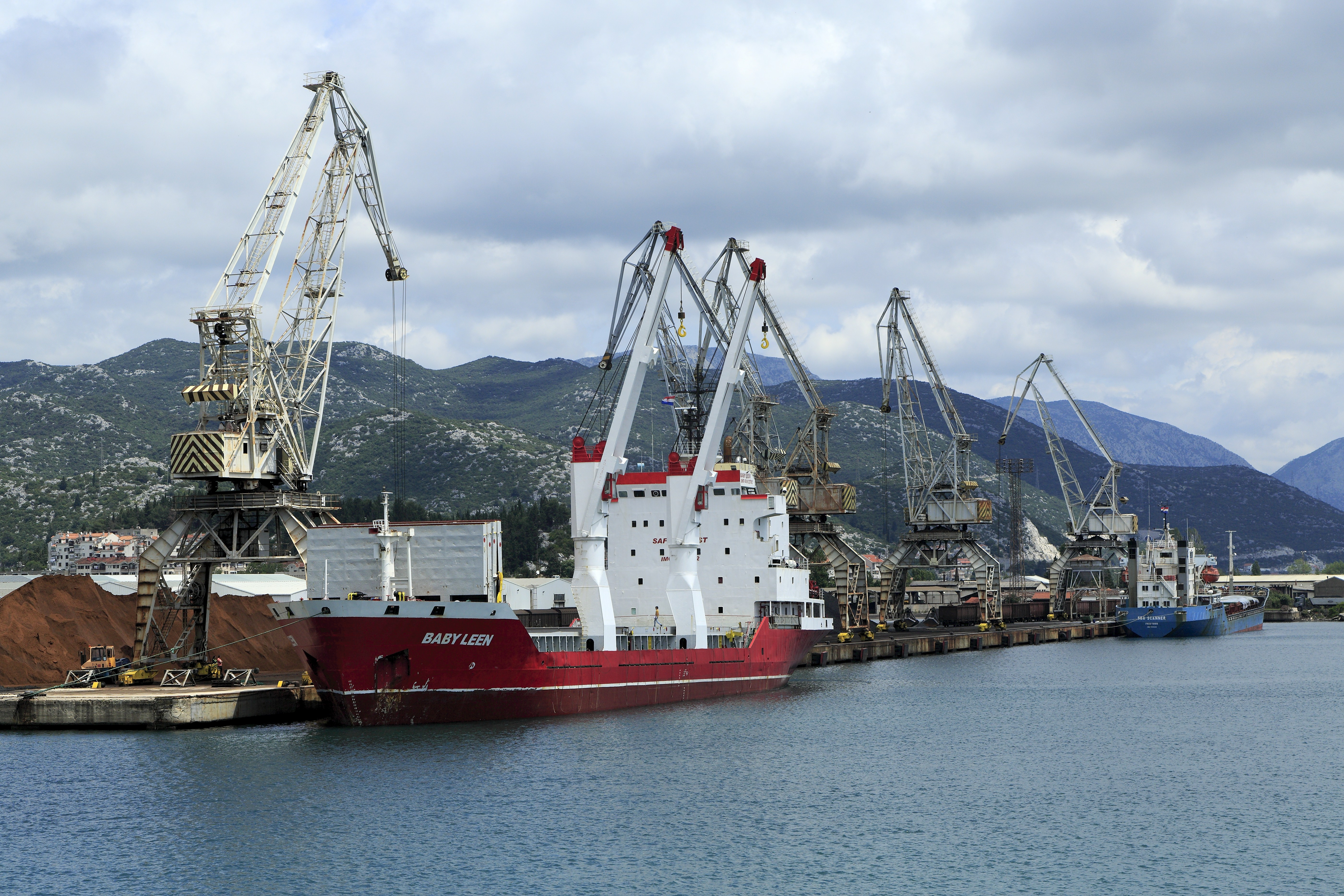
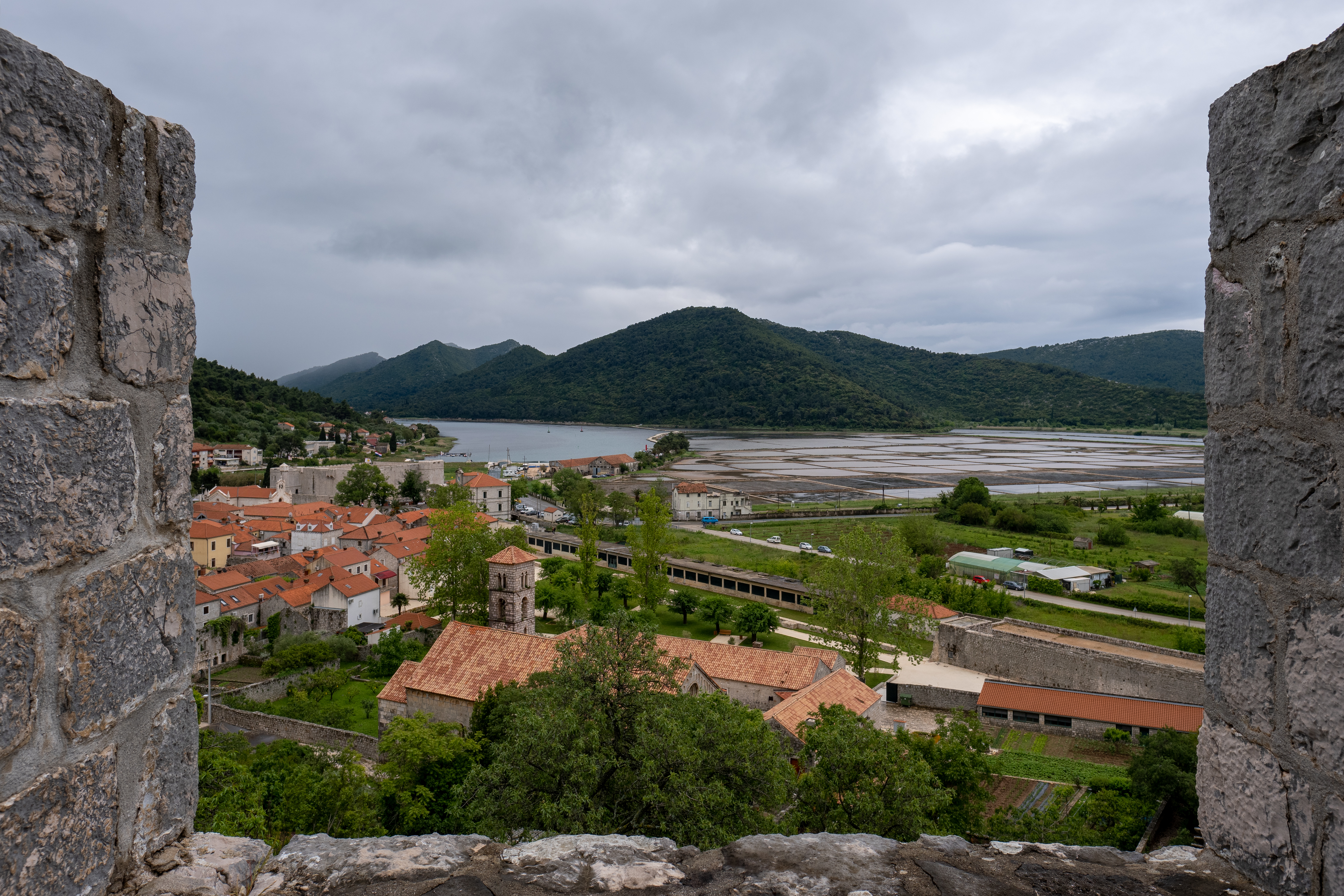
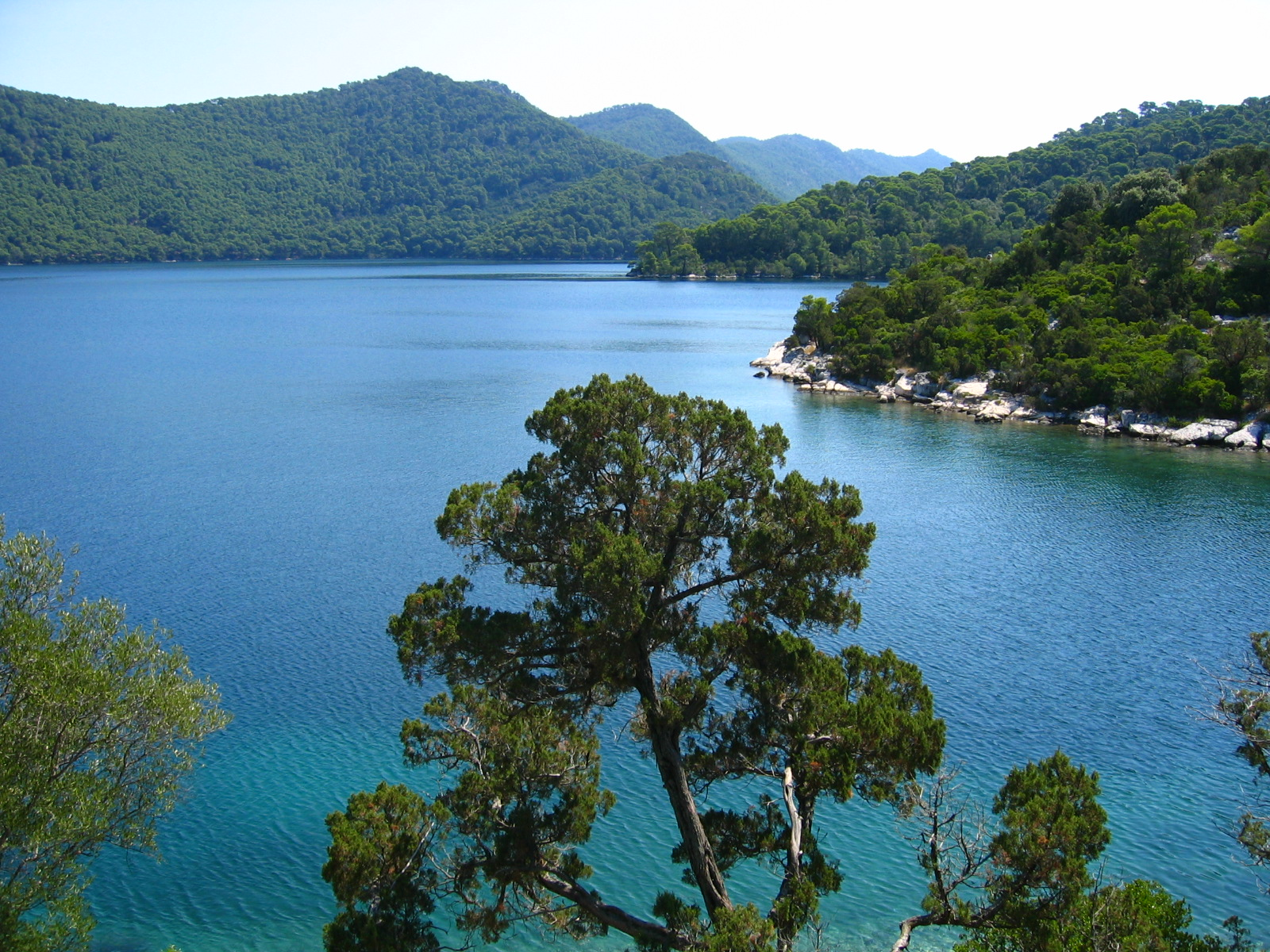
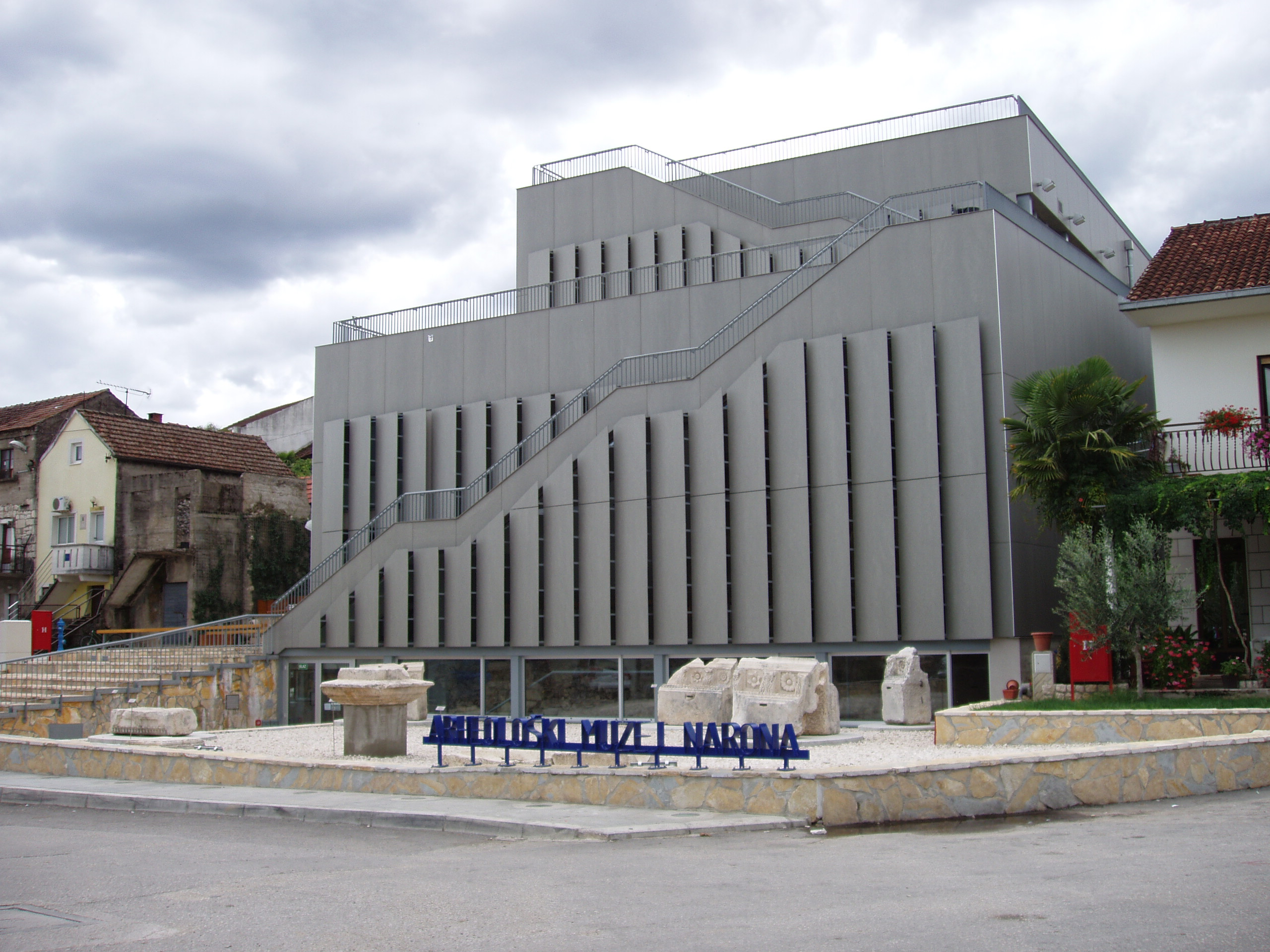

- Flag Coat of arms

- Dubrovnik-Neretva County within Croatia
- Country: Croatia
- County seat: Dubrovnik

Government
  - Župan (Prefect): Blaž Pezo (HDZ)
  - Assembly: 41 members: • HDZ, HSLS, HSP AS, HSU, DDS (21); • MOST (10); • SDP, HNS, HSS (9); • Independents (1)

Area
  - Total: 1,781 km^{2} (688 sq mi)

Population (2021)
  - Total: 115,564
  - Density: 64.89/km^{2} (168.1/sq mi)
- Area code: 020
- ISO 3166 code: HR-19
- HDI (2022): 0.887 very high · 4th
- Website: edubrovnik.org

The Dubrovnik-Neretva County (pronounced [dǔbroːʋniːk-něreːtʋa]; Croatian: Dubrovačko-neretvanska županija, pronounced [dǔbroʋat͡ʃko-nerěːtʋanskaː ʒupǎnija]) is the southernmost county of Croatia. The county seat is Dubrovnik and other large towns are Korčula, Metković, Opuzen and Ploče. The Municipality of Neum, which belongs to neighbouring Bosnia and Herzegovina, divides the county in two parts which are connected only by the Pelješac Bridge. The southern part of the county consists of Dubrovnik and the surrounding area, including the Pelješac peninsula, and the islands of Korčula, Lastovo, Mljet, Šipan, Lopud and Koločep. The northern part of the county includes the Neretva Delta, the Baćina lakes north of Ploče, and a swath of hinterland near the southernmost slopes of Biokovo and around the hill of Rujnica. The northern part of the Mljet island is a national park. The Lastovo archipelago is a designated nature park. The southernmost tip of the county is the Prevlaka peninsula at the border with Montenegro. It is the only Croatian county that borders Montenegro.

The 9 kilometres-long stretch of coast belonging to Bosnia and Herzegovina makes the southern part of Dubrovnik-Neretva County an exclave, disconnecting it from mainland Croatia. There is a road connection to the rest of the country via the Pelješac Bridge. Road traffic going to and from Dubrovnik through Neum is usually less subject to customs controls in order to reduce the traffic congestion. The road connecting Dubrovnik to the rest of the country via Neum has one lane per direction and bus lines passing through Neum often make rest stops there so that passengers can take advantage of lower Bosnian taxes and purchase tobacco and alcoholic beverages as they tend to be cheaper there.

== Administrative division ==
On the local level, the Dubrovnik-Neretva County is further subdivided into 5 towns (grad, pl. gradovi) and 17 municipalities (općina, pl. općine).

Towns
Town	Population (2021 census)
Dubrovnik	41,562
Korčula	5,415
Metković	15,235
Opuzen	2,838
Ploče	8,220

Municipalities
Municipality	Population (2021 census)
Blato	3,330
Dubrovačko primorje	1,636
Janjina	522
Konavle	8,607
Kula Norinska	1,414
Lastovo	748
Lumbarda	1,209
Mljet	1,062
Orebić	3,705
Pojezerje	943
Slivno	2,046
Smokvica	868
Ston	2,491
Trpanj	683
Vela Luka	3,772
Zažablje	553
Župa dubrovačka	8,705

== Demographics ==
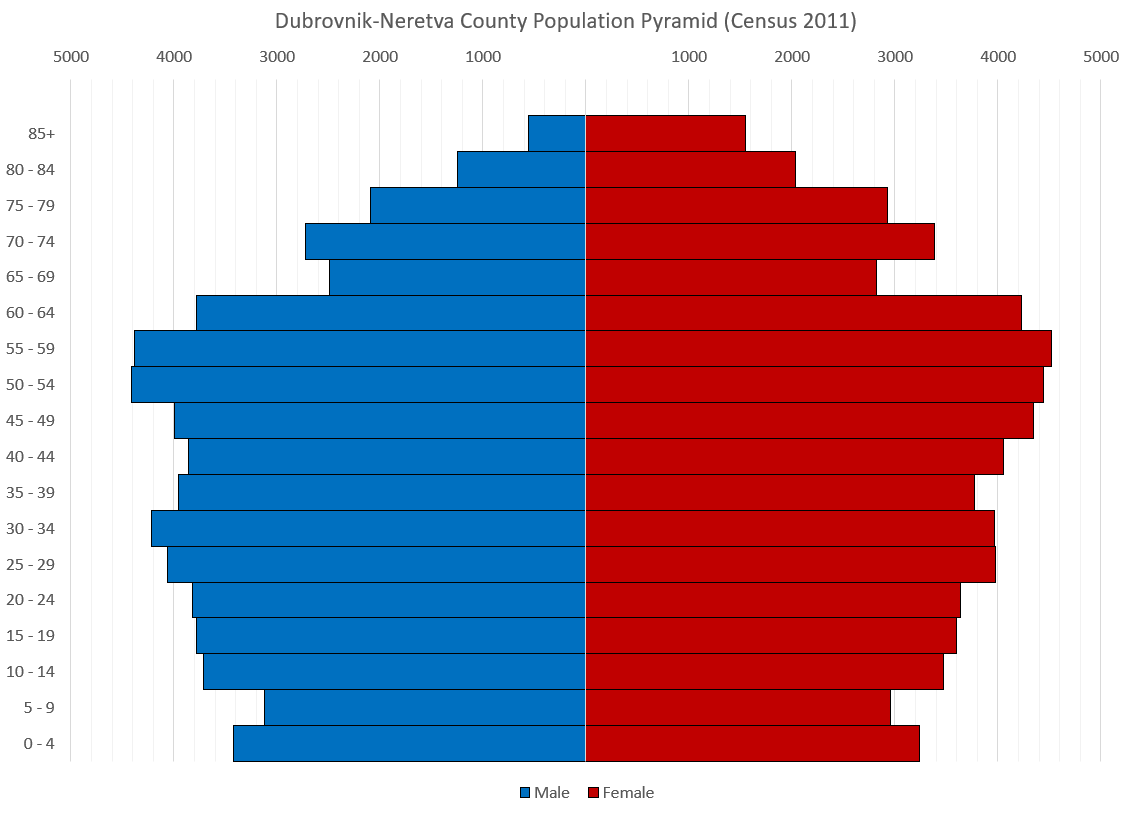
Population pyramid of Dubrovnik-Neretva County per the 2011 Census

Historical populations of Dubrovnik-Neretva County

Year	Pop.	±%
1857	63,379	—
1869	63,292	−0.1%
1880	69,185	+9.3%
1890	74,708	+8.0%
1900	83,135	+11.3%
1910	87,665	+5.4%
1921	86,610	−1.2%
1931	90,577	+4.6%
1948	88,535	−2.3%

Year	Pop.	±%
1953	94,812	+7.1%
1961	99,593	+5.0%
1971	108,131	+8.6%
1981	115,683	+7.0%
1991	126,329	+9.2%
2001	122,870	−2.7%
2011	122,568	−0.2%
2021	115,564	−5.7%

Source: Naselja i stanovništvo Republike Hrvatske 1857–2001, Croatian Bureau of Statistics, Zagreb, 2005

As of the 2021 census, the county had 115,564 residents. The population density is 65 people per km^{2}.

As of the 2011 census, the county had 122,568 residents. The population density is 69 people per km^{2}.

Dubrovnik-Neretva County: Population trends 1857–2021
v

population	63379	63292	69185	74708	83135	87665	86610	90577	88535	94812	99593	108131	115683	126329	122870	122568	115564
	1857	1869	1880	1890	1900	1910	1921	1931	1948	1953	1961	1971	1981	1991	2001	2011	2021

Sources: Croatian Bureau of Statistics publications

At the 2021 census, ethnic Croats formed the vast majority with 94.2% of the population, followed by Bosniaks at 1,4%, Serbs at 1.2% and 3.2% being other ethnic groups combined.

== Protected areas ==
- Mljet National Park
- Lastovo archipelago nature park
