= Odjila =

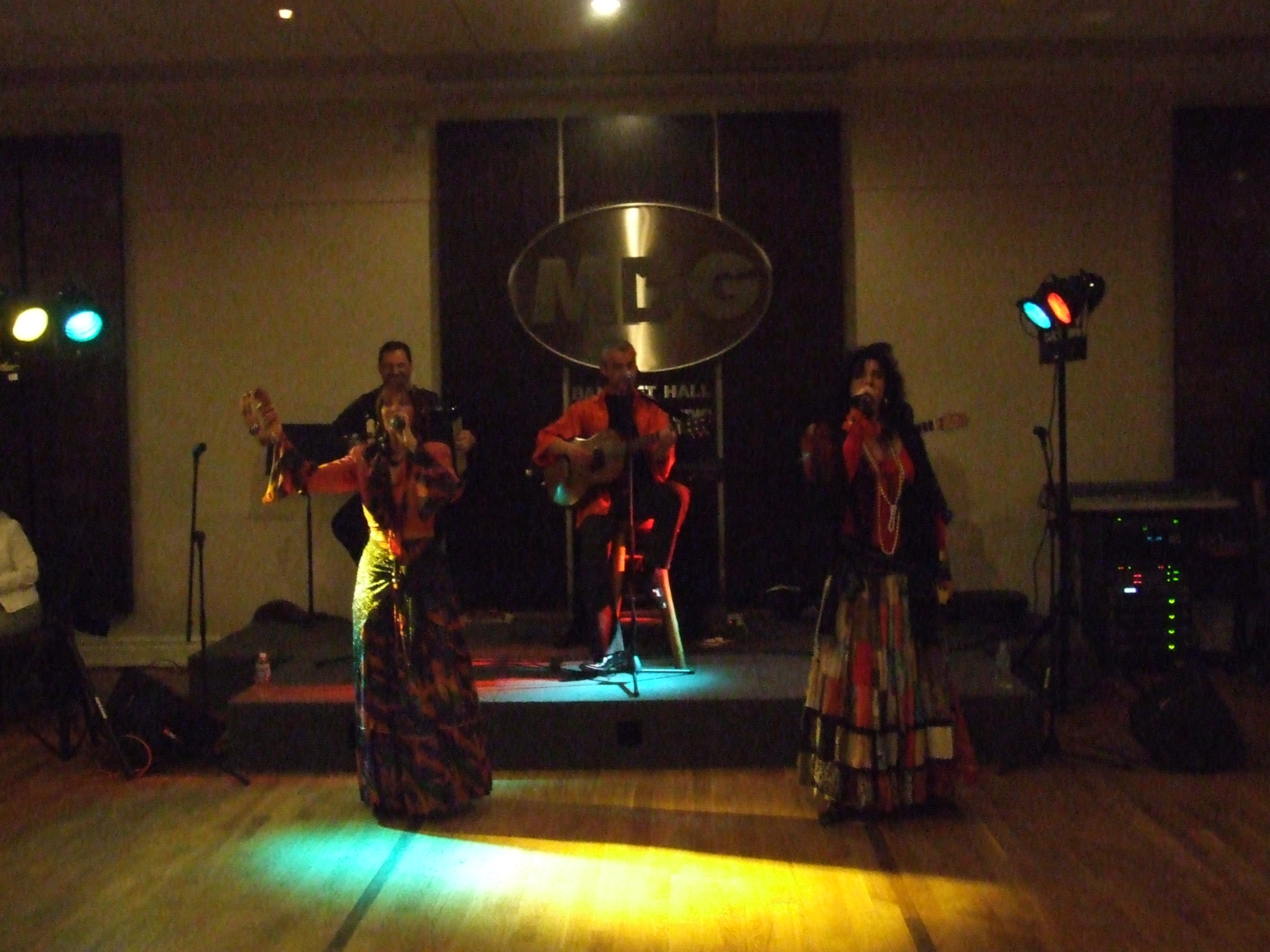
- "Odjila" in 2008

Background information
- Origin: Belgrade, Serbia
- Genres: Gypsy style, Romani music
- Years active: 1983–1990, 2003, 2007–present
- Labels: PGP-RTB
- Members: Sanja Uzelac; Davorka Bosnić; Slobodan Simonović; Boris Nikolić; Andrej Stefanović
- Website: www.grupaodjila.com

Odjila (Serbian Cyrillic: Ођила, Serbian Latin: Ođila) is a Serbian and former Yugoslav music band. It was founded in 1983. What they play is generally referred to as Gypsy music, which is the traditional music of the Romani people of Eastern Europe. The word Odjila is a compound of two words in the Romani language: Odji (oђи) meaning "soul" and djila (ђила) meaning "song" The band performs in the Romani language.

== History ==
Odjila was founded in October 1983 by Igor Dunjić-Zveržhanovski and Slobodan Simonović, who first performed as a duet. They were almost immediately joined by Davorka Bosnić and Sanja Uzelac, and subsequently by Boris Nikolić in 1986, Andrej Stefanović in 1988 and Nikola Diklić in 1989.

The group published five albums. Their third album, called "Odjila − muzika iz filmova" (Odjila - Film Music), featured the music from the films in which they participated − either as musicians or actors. Among these films are The Dark Side of the Sun - starring Brad Pitt in one of the first main roles in his career), Drugi čovek (Second Man), Osmi dan u nedelji (Eight Day of the Week - Davorka Bosnić playing the main role) etc. They also took part in the theatre play Letimo, srešćemo se (We Fly, We Will Meet) directed by Stevo Žigon, as both actors and singers.

Odjila was the first popular music band which had a concert in Kolarac hall in Belgrade, and the first band which played in Maribor theatre, ever since it was founded in the late 19th century. They used to enjoy huge popularity in former Yugoslavia, where they performed all around the country. They represented Yugoslavia in the World Festival of Gypsy Music in London in 1988.

In 1990 some members left the group, with the onset of Yugoslav Wars. Dunjić-Zveržhanovski left for the Netherlands, while Uzelac, Simonović, Nikolić and Stefanović formed a new band called Romano 4, continuing to play Romani music from Eastern Europe as well as their own music.

In 1991, Odjila continues its life. Davorka Bosnic and Nikola Diklic formed a new lineup. A project called “Ciganska Fantazija” (Gypsy Fantasy) was created, involving choir, string ensemble, actors and artists, under Nikola's musical leadership. Premier took place at Kolarac Concert Hall in Belgrade and SNP in Novi Sad. Later in 1994, they published a studio album with the same title, authored and produced by Nikola Diklic.

In 1995 Dasha and Nikola moved to Rome, Italy, and with an international lineup, Odjila has successfully performed at festivals, concert halls and TV shows, Teatro Ghione - Rome, Festival Effeto Venezia - Livorno, Festival LENT - Maribor, Universalhall - Skopje, to name but a few, until 1999, when this lineup stopped. Nikola continued his artistic career in Italy and Denmark.

In May 2003, the band published another album called Odjila in Nederland, which was published in the Netherlands. The album had all the members of Odjila except for Bosnić, who was replaced by Gordana Svilarević. Odjila was finally reunited in 2007. It is now composed of Bosnić, Uzelac, Nikolić, Stefanović and Simonović.

== Musical style ==
Odjila define their style as Gypsy music, based on the tradition of the Romen Theatre from Moscow and the music from legendary Yugoslav and foreign films dealing with Romani, such as Gypsies Are Found Near Heaven. In international festivals they were often wrongly announced as a Romani band from Moscow. When asked about their music, Davorka Bosnić described the band in the following words:

What are we similar to? A painter's canvas… The Moon, stuck in the poplar's tree crown… A land shaking from the force of the coming lava… Gentle caress of a warm wind… A tender touch of something known, of a palm… A lament and a cry, a prayer and a downpour… To mud on the shoes and a child in the womb… To the roaring of hungry lions… Wild horses, unbridled and free… Light in the darkness… A long road and a parcel carried in the heart."

== Discography ==
- Odjila (1984)
- Odjila (1988)
- Odjila - muzika iz filmova (1989)
- Odjila - Ciganska Fantazija (1994)
- Odjila in Nederland (2003)
