= Popular music in Croatia =

Music scene

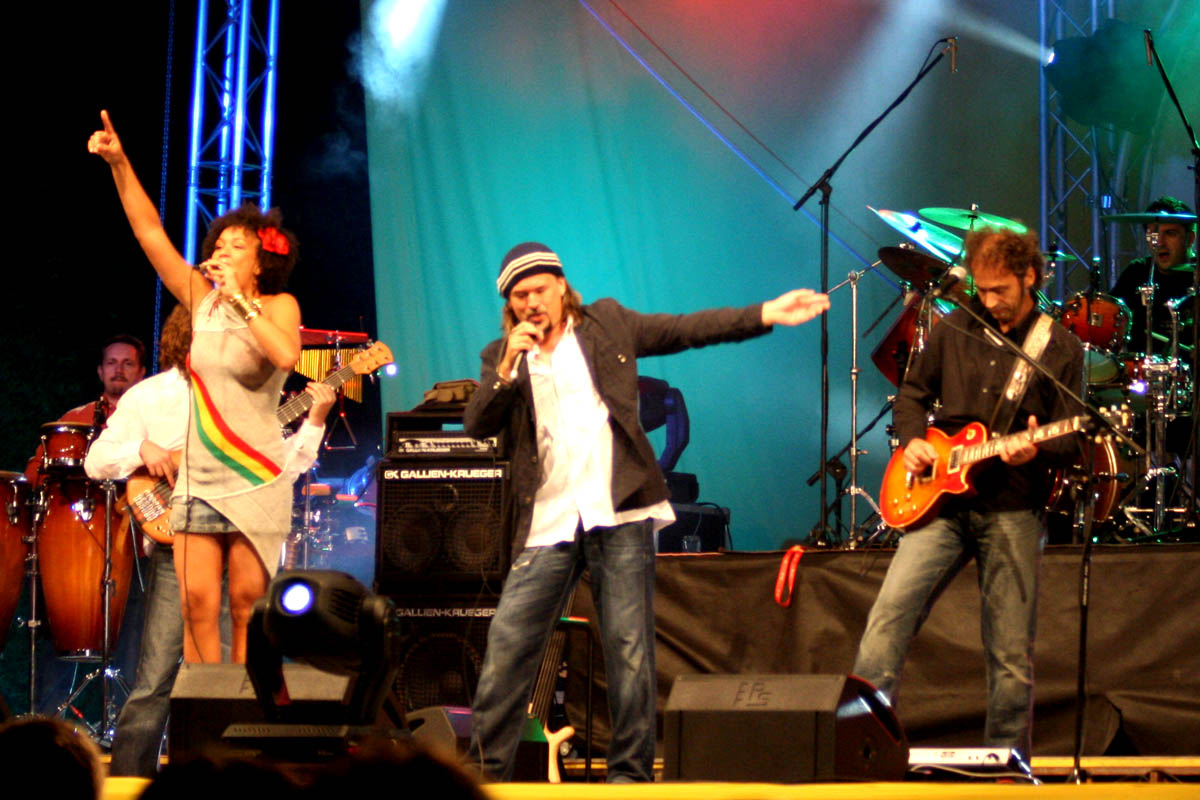
Gibonni performing live

Croatian popular music is the popular music of Croatia.

Prominent mainstream pop artists include: Oliver Dragojević, Gibonni, Dino Dvornik, Toni Cetinski, Thompson and others. Croatia is known for the specific Dalmatian sound performed at various festivals along the Adriatic coast with Oliver Dragojević being one of the most eminent artists. Some of the most successful and long-lasting rock music acts that are treated as "pop" in Croatia include Parni valjak and Prljavo kazalište. A highly acclaimed singer-songwriter is the chanson-inspired Arsen Dedić. Internationally successful singer and songwriter Ivo Robić is a representative of the Zagreb school of schlager. Hip hop bands such as The Beat Fleet and Elemental are also now treated as pop in Croatia. The underground music scene include popular punk rock bands Hladno Pivo, Let 3, and others. Two most popular pop-folk singers, and mainstream artists are Severina and Jelena Rozga.

== History ==
=== 1940s and 1950s ===
Ivo Robić was one of the first acclaimed popular music artists in Yugoslav Croatia. He emerged in the late 1940s and later launched a very successful international career as well, closely cooperating with the famous composer and Polydor producer Bert Kaempfert, whom he convinced to produce the then upcoming act The Beatles after seeing them performing in the Top Ten Club in Hamburg. Robić is the author of the famous schlager that was later popularized by Frank Sinatra as Strangers in the Night.

The Croatian rock music began in the 1950s, and one of the first classic rock-n-roll performers was Karlo Metikoš from Zagreb. He moved to Paris, France where he started a successful international career under the pseudonym Matt Collins. He recorded for Philips Records and had an opportunity to meet legends such as Jerry Lee Lewis and Paul Anka.

=== 1960s and 1970s ===
During the 1960s many prominent groups emerged such as Grupa 220, Crveni koralji and Roboti. The latter featured Ivica Percl, who, after leaving Roboti in September 1966 because "they were too loud," became a protest singer-songwriter influenced by the acoustic sound of Bob Dylan, Donovan and Joan Baez. In the same year, the internationally acclaimed Croatian chanson-influenced singer Tereza Kesovija represented Monaco in the Eurovision Song Contest 1966. Another notable female vocalist who emerged in this period was Josipa Lisac (later Karlo Metikoš's wife) who still enjoys huge popularity in Croatia.

The 1970s saw the emergence of artists who espoused hard rock, progressive rock and other styles. Notable artists of that decade included Dado Topić's Time, Atomsko sklonište and many others. Other important group formed in this period is Parni valjak led by Aki Rahimovski. The late 1970s were marked by the punk rock explosion. The group Paraf from Rijeka was one of the first punk bands in Croatia and the former Yugoslavia in general, and later they moved on to post-punk.

=== 1980s ===
From punk rock emerged the new wave, and Croatia developed a successful scene of its own called Novi val (meaning New wave).

The scene included some the most notable Croatian artists such as Prljavo Kazalište, Azra, Haustor, Film and Aerodrom. This period of the Croatian rock is covered in the rockumentary Sretno dijete released in 2003. Following the decline of the Novi val scene, many new artists emerged during the 1980s: the art rock and New Romantic bands such as Boa and Dorian Gray, the latter led by Massimo Savić, and also the synthpop duo Denis & Denis which featured Marina Perazić, originally from Rijeka, who later became a solo pop artist. Furthermore, from the 1980s to the early 1990s was a great generation which brought out Tomislav Ivčić whose famous song "Večeras je naša fešta" (meaning "Tonight is our night/party") was considered to be one of the best generational songs to have been written, and is also considered to be one of the most chosen karaoke songs to sing. Through this composer, Dalmatia (the Adriatic coast line region) has changed forever due to his great influence, musically and politically.

In another city on the Adriatic coast, in Split, a notable heavy metal group was Osmi putnik, formed in 1985, which featured the now popular solo pop singer Gibonni. Another popular act from this city was the pop group Magazin, where some of the most famous female pop singers began their careers, while one of the most popular mainstream pop acts in the country was Novi fosili, initially with Đurđica Barlović on vocals, later replaced by Sanja Doležal.

A late 1980s popular act was Boris Novković and his band Noćna straža. He is a son of the prominent Croatian composer of popular music Đorđe Novković. During the existence of the former Yugoslavia with SR Croatia as its constituent country, the Croatian music scene contributed a lot to the federal Yugoslav pop and rock. The Croatian candidates were very successful in the former Yugoslav national preselection for the Eurovision Song Contest called Jugovizija. For several consecutive years, Yugoslavia in the Eurovision Song Contest was represented solely by Croatian artists: Doris Dragović in 1986; Novi fosili in 1987; Srebrna krila in 1988, the winners of the Eurovision Song Contest 1989 – the Croatian group Riva, and Tajči in 1990.

=== 1990s ===
The Eurovision Song Contest 1990 was held in the Vatroslav Lisinski Concert Hall in Zagreb, where again, Yugoslavia was represented by a Croatian artist – Tajči. An important person behind most of these successful Croatian Eurovision acts was the prominent popular music producer and composer Zrinko Tutić.

With the outbreak of the Croatian War of Independence many Croatian musicians gathered to record humanitarian or tribute albums for the Croatian forces. Such projects included Hrvatski Band Aid and Rock za Hrvatsku. The latter included the famous song "E, moj druže Beogradski" (Hey my Belgrade comrade) by Jura Stublić, the frontman of the group Film. Following the proclamation of Croatia as an independent state, many new Croatian artists emerged. One of the most notable hits in this period was Tek je 12 sati by the dance-pop group ET (Electro-team). Croatia's national music awards, Porins, were established in 1994..

Croatian independence also introduced a new generation of performers such as Daleka Obala, Thompson and pop act Baruni.

== Festivals ==
Croatia is known for its specific Dalmatian folk music sound which mixed with various forms of popular music is represented at the festivals held on the Adriatic coast, such as the Split Festival and formerly the Opatija Festival. This style of music is similar to the Italian Canzone and the Sanremo Music Festival and some of its most notable act are Oliver Dragojević and Mišo Kovač. One of the most notable festival solo singer was Vice Vukov, who represented former Yugoslavia at the Eurovision Song Contest 1963 and 1965, before being accused of croatian nationalism during the Croatian Spring and subsequently persecuted by the Yugoslav authorities. Other eminent festival performers include: Tereza Kesovija, Doris Dragović, Jasna Zlokić, Meri Cetinić and formerly the group Dubrovački trubaduri. The latter featured elements of the Dubrovnik renaissance music traditions.

== Eurovision Song Contest ==
Croatia has taken part in the Eurovision Song Contest as an independent country since 1993. As of 2024, its best placing so far was 2nd in 2024.

== See also ==
- Music of Croatia
- Music of Yugoslavia
