= Boa =

Boa, BoA, or BOA may refer to:

== Snakes ==
- Any member of the Boidae, a family of medium to large, non-venomous, constricting snakes
  - Any member of the Boinae, a subfamily of boid snakes
    - Any member of Boa (genus), a group of boid snakes
- Any member of the Bolyeriidae, a.k.a. Round Island boas, a small family of non-venomous snakes from Mauritius and nearby islands
- Any member of the Tropidophiidae, a.k.a. dwarf boas, a family of non-venomous snakes found in Central America, South
- A common name for Boa constrictor

== Organisations ==
- Bank of America, a large American banking and financial services company
- Bank of Africa, a multinational bank
- Boliviana de Aviación (BoA), a Bolivian state airline
- Boun Oum Airways, a defunct Laotian Airline
- British Octopush Association, the controlling body for underwater hockey in the United Kingdom
- British Olympic Association, which oversees Britain's participation in the Olympic Games
- British Optical Association
- British Orthopaedic Association
- Biuro Operacji Antyterrorystycznych (Bureau of Anti-terrorist Operations), the anti-terrorist arm of the Police of Poland
- Başbakanlık Osmanlı Arşivleri (The Prime Minister's Ottoman Archives), one of the main Ottoman archives in İstanbul, Turkey

== Music ==
- Bôa, a rock band formed in London in 1993
- Bands of America, an organization that arranges high school marching band competitions
- Black Oak Arkansas, an American rock band
- Bloodstock Open Air, a British hard rock and extreme metal festival
- BoA (album), the debut English by the South Korean singer BoA
- Boa (album), the debut album by the Croatian band Boa
- Boa (Croatian band), a Croatian and former Yugoslav music group
- "Boa" (song), a song by American rapper Megan Thee Stallion

== Film ==
- New Alcatraz, also known as Boa, a 2001 direct-to-video B-horror film
- Boa... Nguu yak!, a 2006 Thai horror film also known as Boa

== People with the name Boa ==
- BoA (born 1986), South Korean singer
- Boa Sr. (1925–2010), last native speaker of the Aka-Bo language
- Kim Boa (born 1987), South Korean singer, member of the girl group Spica
- Phillip Boa (born 1962), German musician
- Luís Boa Morte, Portuguese footballer whose family name is Boa Morte
- Boa (wrestler), Chinese professional wrestler
- Ryan Boa, Canadian drag queen also known as BOA (Bitch On Arrival)
- Boa, former percussionist for Japanese heavy metal music ensemble Hanabie.
- Bruce Boa (1930–2004), Canadian actor

== Other ==
- Boa (clothing accessory), a type of scarf, typically made of synthetic or real feathers
- Boa (web server), a small-footprint web server
- Boa, Cagdianao, a barangay in the Philippines
- Boa Esporte Clube, a Brazilian football (soccer) club
- Boa Island, in Northern Ireland
- Born–Oppenheimer approximation, an approximation used in quantum chemistry and molecular physics
- Boa Hancock, a character in the manga One Piece
- Binary Optimization Architecture (or Binary-translation and Optimization Architecture) (BOA), an early dynamic binary translation from IBM Research, circa 1999

== See also ==
- Aboa (disambiguation)
