= Denis & Denis =

Croatian and Yugoslav synth-pop group

- Denis & Denis founding and best-known members, Davor Tolja and Marina Perazić.

Background information
- Origin: Rijeka, Croatia
- Genres: Synth-pop; pop rock; pop
- Years active: 1982–1988; 2012–2026
- Labels: Jugoton; Croatia Records; Dallas Records
- Past members: Davor Tolja; Marina Perazić; Edi Kraljić; Ruby Montanari Knez

Denis & Denis was a Croatian and Yugoslav synth-pop group formed in Rijeka in 1982. They were one of the most prominent and most popular acts of the Yugoslav synth-pop scene.

Formed as a duo consisting of keyboardist and vocalist Davor Tolja and vocalist Marina Perazić, Denis & Denis immediately gained attention of the Yugoslav audience with their first recordings broadcast on Yugoslav radio stations. Their debut album Čuvaj se!, released in 1984, brought them nationwide popularity, Perazić becoming one of the biggest stars of the Yugoslav rock scene and often described as sex symbol. Their second album Ja sam lažljiva was recorded during Tolja's military leaves from the Yugoslav army and released while he was still serving his army stint, so for promotional live performances he was replaced by Edi Kraljić, his former bandmate from the group Linija 32. Ja sam lažljiva brought new hits and increased the group's popularity. After Tolja's return from the army, the group continued working as a trio consisting of Tolja, Perazić and Kraljić. After Perazić left the group in 1986 to start a solo career, Tolja and Kraljić continued working as Denis & Denis, turning towards pop rock sound. After the release of the album Budi tu in 1988, the group disbanded, Tolja dedicating himself to studio work.

In 2012, Tolja, Perazić and Krajić reunited in order to mark 30 years since the group's formation with a series of concerts across Croatia and former Yugoslav republics. Simultaneously, Tolja recorded the fourth Denis & Denis album, entitled Restart, with new vocalist, Ruby Montanari Knez. Following Restart promotional tour, the group had made occasional live appearances only. In 2026, Tolja and Perazić held Denis & Denis farewell tour across Croatia, Serbia, and Slovenia.

== History ==
=== The beginnings (1977–1982) ===
Keyboardist Davor Tolja started his career at the end of the 1970s in the art rock band Vrijeme i Zemlja, recording the 1979 album Vrijeme i Zemlja with the group. After the group disbanded, he continued working with the bands Termiti and Beta Centaury, also making a guest appearance on the debut album by the band Xenia. He formed the band Linija 32 (Line 32), which featured former Beta Centaury member Edi Kraljić (vocals), Elvis Stanić (guitar), former Vrijeme i Zemlja member Marinko Radetić (bass guitar) and Damir Žudić (drums). The band managed to perform at the prominent Subotica Youth Festival, but was short-lived, as at one point all of the members except Tolja had to serve their mandatory stints in the Yugoslav army. For the 1981 edition of RI Rock festival, Tolja, Kraljić and Stanić formed the one-off band Toljina Funk Selekcija (Tolja's Funk Selection). The band featured vocalist Marina Perazić, who was at the time a civil engineering student. Prior to Toljina Funk Selekcija, Perazić was a member of the choir Jeka Primorja (Echo of the Coastline) and the multimedia group Sigma Tau. After Toljina Funk Selekcija disbanded, Tolja and Perazić recorded the song "Zimski vjetar" ("Winter Wind") with chanson singer Damir Pandur for the Zagreb Music Festival. Tolja played and did the arrangements for the song, and Perazić recorded backing vocals. The song was released on the festival's official compilation album ZagrebFest – Šansone (ZagrebFest – Chansons) in 1982, being the first song recorded together by Tolja and Perazić.

=== Marina Perazić years: Peak of popularity (1982–1986) ===
In the summer of 1982, Tolja and Perazić formed the synth-pop duo Denis & Denis. Tolja chose the name for the band after an imaginary law firm Denis & Denis & Partners from a science fiction short story he had read. The band made demo recordings which were broadcast on radio stations in Rijeka, Zagreb and Belgrade and attracted large attention of the Yugoslav audience. The duo had their first live performance on 30 December 1982, appearing as the opening band at Boa's concert in Rijeka's Youth Hall.

In 1984, the band released their debut album, Čuvaj se! (Take Care!), through Jugoton record label. The album was produced by Tolja and Andrej Baša and featured guest appearances by Dorian Gray frontman Massimo Savić on guitar, and Tolja's former bandmate from Linija 32 Edi Kraljić and future Let 3 member Zoran Prodanović "Prlja" on vocals, who was at the time a member of the band Umjetnici Ulice (Artists of the Street). The album's biggest hit was the song "Program tvog kompjutera" ("A Program of Your Computer"), originally named "San po san" ("Dream by Dream"), before Jugoton editor Siniša Škarica came up with new lyrics for the song refrain. Čuvaj se! brought nationwide popularity to the group with its radiophonic songs and sexually suggestive vocals of Perazić, who was often being described by the Yugoslav press as a sex symbol. At the end of the year, Čuvaj se! was polled the Album of the Year in the magazine Rock by both the magazine's music critics and readers.

During 1985, Tolja was serving his stint in the Yugoslav army. During his military leaves, he and Perazić recorded the mini-album Ja sam lažljiva (I Am Mendacious). The music was composed by Tolja, and the lyrics were written by Domenika Vasić, Alka Vuica and Mladen Popović. The audio cassette version of the album featured two additional tracks, two demo recordings from 1983, "Gluhi telefoni" ("Deaf Telephones") and "Mala noćna zadovoljstva" ("Little Night Pleasures"). On promotional performances, Edi Kraljić stepped in as the replacement for Tolja, and also appeared in promotional videos recorded for the songs from the album. The album brought the hits "Ja sam lažljiva", "Voli me još ovu noć" ("Love Me for Just One More Night") and "Soba 23" ("Room 23"), the latter followed by an erotic music video, and increased the group's popularity. During the same year, director Dinko Tucaković made the science fiction TV film entitled Denis & Denis for Television Belgrade. The film was shot at Košutnjak Film Studios, starred Perazić and Kraljić and featured Denis & Denis songs. During that year, Perazić also recorded the song "Plava jutra" ("Blue Mornings") with Rex Ilusivii and took part in the YU Rock Misija project, a Yugoslav contribution to Live Aid, contributing vocals to the song "Za Milion Godina". In addition, Denis & Denis performed at the corresponding charity concert held at the Red Star Stadium in Belgrade. At the end of the year, in Rock magazine Marina Perazić was polled Female Vocalist of the Year and the Sexiest Person on the Yugoslav Scene, and "Ja sam lažljiva" video was polled the Music Video of the Year.

After Tolja's return from the army, Denis & Denis continued as a trio consisting of Tolja, Perazić and Kraljić. The group appeared at the 1985 MESAM festival with the song "Oaze snova" ("Oases of Dreams"), winning the Best Female Vocalist Award, and at the 1986 Jugovizija festival in Pristina with the song "Braća Grim i Andersen" ("Brothers Grimm and Andersen"), winning third place. In September 1986, Perazić left the group to start a solo career.

=== Without Perazić: Shift to pop rock and disbandment (1986–1988) ===
Tolja and Kraljić continued to work as Denis & Denis, forming a backing band consisting of their former bandmates from Linija 32. In 1988, they released the album Budi tu (Be There), which marked the group's shift toward pop rock and power pop sound. The songs were composed by Tolja, who also wrote lyrics for one of the songs, while the rest of the lyrics were written by Kraljić, Mladen Popović and Riblja Čorba frontman Bora Đorđević. The album brought minor hits "Bengalski tigar" ("Bengal Tiger") and "Miris krila anđela"("Smell of the Angel's Wings"). After a series of promotional concerts, the group ended its activity.

=== Post breakup ===
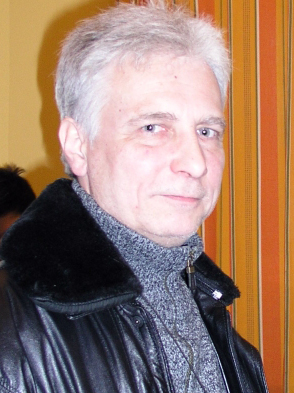
Davor Tolja in 2008

Perazić released her debut solo album, entitled Marina, in 1987. A year later, with husband Ivan Fece "Firchie" (former drummer of the band Ekatarina Velika) she moved to New York City. For a decade she did not record or perform. After Fece and her divorced in 1997, she returned to Rijeka, but choose Belgrade as her career base. In 1998, she released her comeback album Ista kao more (The Same as the Sea). In 2004, she released the single "Sex bez dodira" ("Sex Without Touch"), which is her latest solo release. During the following years, she performed in clubs across the region. In the 2010s, she started performing as a DJ.

Tolja turned towards work in studio, working as a producer. In 1989, he released the pop-oriented solo album Stari mačak (Old Cat), which he recorded with guitarist Elvis Stanić. After the outbreak of the Yugoslav Wars, he initiated Riječki Band Aid (Rijeka Band Aid) project, with which he recorded the single "Sretan Božić i Nova godina" ("Merry Christmas and a Happy New Year"). He participated in the Split '92 music festival with the song "S okusom mora" ("With the Taste of the Sea") and the 1993 Opatija festival with the song "Sanjaj me" ("Dream of Me"), performing the latter with vocalist Mateo of the band Putokaz (Signpost). For the various artist compilation album Zaje'no za mir (To'ether for Peace) he recorded the song "Techno Army". He wrote the song "Probudi me" ("Wake Me Up") performed by the Croatian group E.N.I. on the 1997 Eurovision Song Contest.

=== Reunion and new incarnation of the band, farewell tour (2012–2026) ===
In 2012, Tolja, Perazić and Kraljić reunited in order to mark 30 years since the band's formation. The reunited Denis & Denis also featured a new vocalist, young singer Ruby Montanari Knez. The group held their first performance since the late 1980s on 7 December 2012 in Tvornica kulture hall in Zagreb, and on the New Year's Eve they held a concert at Rijeka main city square, followed by concerts in the region. In 2013, Tolja and Ruby Montanari Knez recorded the fourth Denis & Denis album, entitled Restart. The songs were composed by Tolja, the lyrics were written by Alida Šarar, and the album featured guest appearances by Matija Dedić, Vava Simčić and Frano Lasić, the latter on the song "Nisam bila sa njim" ("I Haven't Been With Him"). The album was mostly pop-oriented and was met with lukewarm reactions by the audience and the critics. Despite the fact that only Montanari Knez took part in the album recording, on the concerts which followed the album release, Perazić and Kraljić also performed with the group. In 2015, the compilation Demo Tapes was released, featuring the group's demo recordings from 1982 and 1983 which had in early 1980s provided them the contract with Jugoton.

In 2015, Tolja joined the band Whiteheads, recording the 2021 album Whiteheads with them. Since Restart promotional tour, Tolja and Perazić have made occasional live appearances as Denis & Denis. In January 2026, the two announced that Denis & Denis will do their final concerts as a part of the Posljednji program tvog kompjutera (The Last Program of Your Computer) tour. The tour included dates in Slovenia, Croatia and Serbia. It began on 14 March in Ljubljana and ended on 10 April 2026 in Zagreb.

== Legacy ==
The song "Program tvog kompjutera" was covered by Croatian alternative rock band Gipps on their 1997 album Uh!. The song "Voli me još ovu noć" was covered by Croatian klapa Libar on their 2008 album Prvi (The First One). The same song was covered by Croatian singers Carla Belovari and Bojan Jambrošić on the 2013 album Zapisano u zvijezdama (Written in the Stars).

In 2015, Čuvaj se! was polled No.65 on the list of 100 Greatest Yugoslav Albums published by the Croatian edition of Rolling Stone.

In 2006, "Program tvog kompjutera" was polled No.77 on the B92 Top 100 Yugoslav songs list.

== Discography ==
=== Studio albums ===
- Čuvaj se! (1984)
- Ja sam lažljiva (1985)
- Budi tu (1988)
- Restart (2013)

=== Compilation albums ===
- Program tvog kompjutera (1995)
- The Best Of (2006)
- 2 na 1 (2010)
- Demo Tapes (2015)
- The Best Of Collection (2017)

=== Singles ===
- "Program tvog kompjutera" / "Noć" (1984)
- "Oaze snova" / "Voli me još ovu noć" (1985)
- "Bengalski tigar" / "Bio sam dijete" (1987)
