= YU Rock Misija =

Yugoslav rock charity supergroup

YU Rock Misija participants during the recording of the "Za milion godina" video.

YU Rock Misija (known in English as YU Rock Mission) was the Socialist Federal Republic of Yugoslavia's contribution to Bob Geldof's Band Aid campaign, which culminated with the Live Aid concert. It consisted of recording the "Za milion godina" charity single and staging a concert held at Red Star Stadium in Belgrade on 15 June 1985, both featuring top acts of the Yugoslav rock scene. The proceeds from both the single and the concert were given to Band Aid.

== Background ==
Talking about how YU Rock Misija came about, rock critic Petar "Peca" Popović stated in an interview for the Rockovnik documentary TV series:

YU Rock Misija was our response to what was going on in late 1984 and early 1985, when the campaign of solidarity with the hungry in Africa was initiated. Globally, Bob Geldof had been doing it. Locally [in Yugoslavia], some people at the 1984 Opatija Festival agreed something should be done. A [general] agreement was reached, but they weren't exactly sure what should be done and how it should be done, so some of them came to seek my opinion. I said: It's simple, we should make a record, release it as part of an issue of the Rock magazine thereby selling it in the same number of copies Rock is printed in, and then put on a concert.

== "Za milion godina" ==
"Za milion godina"

Single by YU Rock Misija
- B-side: "Za milion godina (Instrumentalna verzija)"
- Released: 1985
- Genre: Pop rock
- Label: PGP-RTB
- Songwriters: Dragoljub Ilić, Mladen Popović
- Producer: Saša Habić

The song, entitled "Za milion godina" ("For a Million Years") was composed by Dragoljub Ilić, former leader of the hard rock band Generacija 5, and the lyrics were written by Mladen Popović, who had previously written lyrics for Denis & Denis, Oliver Mandić and other acts, and was, at the time, an editor of the TV show Hit meseca (Hit of the Month).

In an interview for Rockovnik, Ilić stated:

Thanks to the institutional support, mainly from Radio-Television Belgrade and [its in-house record label] PGP-RTB, we made the song, [...] and we gathered literally the best that former Yugoslavia had [to offer musically], and in three days we did the video, music, arrangements.

A large number of musicians took part in the recording sessions, mostly as vocalists. At the time, Ilić's former band Generacija 5 had been defunct for three years, but former members of the group reunited to record instrumental sections: Ilić (keyboards), Dragan Jovanović (guitar), Dušan Petrović (bass guitar), and Slobodan Đorđević (drums). Additionally, Vlatko Stefanovski of Leb i Sol recorded the guitar solo. The song was produced by renowned producer Saša Habić.

=== Personnel ===
- Oliver Mandić – vocals
- Sergio Blažić (of Atomsko Sklonište) – vocals
- Željko Bebek – vocals
- Marina Perazić (of Denis & Denis) – vocals
- Momčilo Bajagić (of Bajaga i Instruktori) – vocals
- Vesna Vrandečić (of Xenia) – vocals
- Aki Rahimovski (of Parni Valjak) – vocals
- Zorica Kondža – vocals
- Slađana Milošević – vocals
- Dado Topić – vocals
- Massimo Savić (of Dorian Gray) – vocals
- Zdravko Čolić – vocals
- Jura Stublić (of Film) – vocals (choir)
- Husein Hasanefendić (of Parni Valjak) – vocals (choir)
- Snežana Stamenković (of Aska) – vocals (choir)
- Izolda Barudžija (of Aska) – vocals (choir)
- Snežana Mišković (of Aska) – vocals (choir)
- Alen Islamović (of Divlje Jagode) – vocals (choir)
- Sead Lipovača (of Divlje Jagode) – vocals (choir)
- Dejan Cukić (of Bajaga i Instruktori) – vocals (choir)
- Ljuba Ninković (of Tunel) – vocals (choir)
- Doris Dragović (of More) – vocals (choir)
- Anja Rupel (of Videosex) – vocals (choir)
- Srđan Šaper (of Idoli) – vocals (choir)
- Vlada Divljan (of Idoli) – vocals (choir)
- Peđa D' Boy (of Peđa D' Boy Band) – vocals (choir)
- Zoran Predin (of Lačni Franz) – vocals (choir)
- Igor Popović (of Jakarta) – vocals (choir)
- Vlatko Stefanovski (of Leb i Sol) – vocals (choir), guitar (solo)
- Dragan Jovanović – guitar
- Dušan Petrović – bass guitar
- Slobodan Đorđević – drums
- Dragoljub Ilić – keyboards

==== Additional personnel ====
- Saša Habić – producer
- Đorđe Petrović – recording
- Jugoslav Vlahović – cover

=== Single cover ===
The cover was designed by prominent cartoonist and designer Jugoslav Vlahović. The original design, which appeared in the March 1985 issue of Rock, featured skull and crossbones symbols on the black background, which were omitted from the final design.

=== Release ===
Rock magazine's 75th issue, which the "Za milion godina" single was distributed with.

The song was released on a 7-inch single, with its instrumental version as the B-side. The single was distributed with the 75th issue of the Rock magazine, published on 22 May 1985. The issue was printed in 150,000 copies, thus the initial number of the singles sold was 150,000. A number of records was given to Yugoslav radio stations in order to promote the single.

=== Notable absences ===
Bora Đorđević and Goran Bregović, leaders of Riblja Čorba and Bijelo Dugme respectively—two most popular Yugoslav bands at the time—did not take part in the recording sessions. It was later revealed that Đorđević's refusal to participate may have been based, at least partly, on his wrong assumption about the project being government-initiated, unaware that individual Yugoslav musicians and music industry people started it on their own accord. In a 1985 interview, published before the song recording, he stated:

No, I won't [appear on the record]! I took part in a [previously held] show to raise funds for the Ethiopians, and that's enough as far as I'm concerned. Everybody's initiating all kinds of campaigns to help them, and no one is trying to help Yugoslavia! I will play day and night for free, for charity, for whatever you want, but only after they [Yugoslav authorities] lower our [musicians'] monstrous [income] taxes, after they allow us to import musical instruments, after they give us [social] apartments... When we're needed to play for charity—we musicians are great, but otherwise we're [treated like] shit! If they'd finally give us the status of cultural workers, we could play for free, with pleasure!

However, the article published in Rock magazine in March 1985 as a companion piece to the release of "Za milion godina" stated that Bregović and Đorđević were prevented from appearing on the recording due to their respective bands' touring commitments. The piece further announced that the two would appear at the song's performance on the Hit meseca TV show alongside Bijelo Dugme vocalist Mladen Vojičić "Tifa". In late April 1985, Đorđević, Bregović and Vojičić did show up for the video shoot at RTB studios in Košutnjak and can be seen in the video for the song.

Dragoljub Ilić stated in an interview that Branimir "Džoni" Štulić, leader of the highly popular band Azra, was not considered for the song recording because he had already moved abroad to the Netherlands.

In an October 1985 interview for Džuboks magazine, Zabranjeno Pušenje frontman Nele Karajlić was asked about his absence from YU Rock Misija several months earlier. He stated:

I oppose it. In my opinion, it's an entirely manipulative thing without moral or economic justification. Americans are now like bosses. Here's the money, right? Those motherf... Should I now look at those troubadours drunk with joy [referring to Live Aid], giving away 0.03% of their paycheck [...] They won't give up smoking Marlboro, but are willing to give something [supposedly] out of solidarity, something they will get back in several months, in the form of raw materials or manpower. They will sell food to Somalia so the Somalis can buy arms from them. [...] It would be like me robbing a man on the street, leaving him 200,000 million dollars in the hole thus forcing him into starvation. And after five years I meet him again, and now I give him two dinars so he can survive. It's idiotic.

In an interview for the magazine Blitz, also in October 1985, Karajlić stated:

There's an old Indian proverb: There's no point in giving a man fish, the point is to teach him how to catch it. Capitalism (concerts at Wembley and in Philadelphia) keeps telling us that's the right thing to do, sending fish to Ethiopia. And at the same time, during the same night between 13 and 14 of July, they told us quite clearly that they won't be sending the fishing net to Ethiopia. Looking at the fat and old faces of the rockers entertaining the global youth during that evening, their message for Africa was clear: "We will always be displaying solidarity with you, but you will always be hungry".

Singer-songwriter Đorđe Balašević was not invited to participate. In an August 1986 interview for Rock magazine, he stated:

I'm a bit underrated, and maybe even wrongly presented. In the past, I've more often been in the company of [pop acts] Zlatko Pejaković and Novi Fosili, than in the company of [rock bands] Bijelo Dugme and Riblja Čorba, which I believe are my natural company. It stung me and hurt me when they didn't invite me to YU Rock Misija, because I believe I could have—not as a singer but as a songwriter—I could have written at least a strophe...

Footage from the studio recordings show Ekatarina Velika bass guitarist Bojan Pečar being present in the studio during the single recording, although neither him nor any other of the band members took part in the song. The band would appear on the corresponding charity concert at Red Star Stadium.

=== "Za milion godina" music video ===
The video shoot for the "Za milion godina" track took place on 29 April 1985 at Television Belgrade's studios in Košutnjak.

== The concert ==
The corresponding charity concert was held at Red Star Stadium on 15 June 1985, less than a month before Live Aid. Beside the musicians who had already participated in the song recording and the bands they were members of, additional acts performed at the live show. Some 20,000 spectators attended the concert. The following acts played the show, in the order of appearance:

- Magično Oko
- Avtomobili
- Piloti
- Partibrejkers
- Ekatarina Velika
- YU Rock Misija
- Plavi Orkestar
- Denis & Denis
- Atomsko Sklonište
- Jakarta
- Peđa D'Boy Band
- Film
- Videosex
- Željko Bebek
- Bajaga i Instruktori
- Slađana Milošević
- Elvis J. Kurtovich & His Meteors
- Tunel
- Vatreni Poljubac
- Lačni Franz
- Aska
- Električni Orgazam
- Kerber
- Balkan

Marked by uncooperative weather and technical issues, the eight-hour concert was broadcast live on Radio Television of Belgrade. The broadcast was also carried in Cuba and Czechoslovakia.

In a mid-2000s interview for Rockovnik, Hit meseca's host and producer Dubravka Marković talked about the weather and logistical issues during the live show:

We had weather-related problems. It was raining, then it stopped. The second problem was that [in an effort of preserving the grass for their ongoing football season], the Red Star Stadium management people did not allow the crowd to get out on the pitch, so the audience and the performers shouted at each other from the opposite ends of the stadium.

In an interview for Rockovnik, Bajaga i Instruktori frontman Momčilo Bajagić complained about the unusual setup and sound issues during the stadium show:

They didn't let the crowd onto the pitch, so we [performers] got positioned at the stadium's western stand while the crowd was opposite us at the eastern stand. All of which was a "brilliant" solution because we'd look out from the stage over the empty pitch without even being able to see if there's anybody on the other side. And the echo was so huge, I remember Milić Vukašinović cursing into the microphone while we were live on air because he thought someone turned on the delay. When you would say "good evening", the people over on the east stand heard it as "good evening, good evening, good evening, good evening..."

Milić Vukašinović, performing with his band Vatreni Poljubac, dissatisfied with constant echo, stopped playing in the middle of the song "Živio Rock 'n' Roll" ("Long Live Rock 'n' Roll"), saying angrily into the microphone: "It's not good... Fuck it, it's not good!". His profane outburst was later criticized by a sizable section of the public.

== Airing during Live Aid ==
The song was, alongside a corresponding message from Belgrade, conveyed by Mladen Popović, aired on Wembley Stadium during Live Aid concert, between Run–D.M.C. and Black Sabbath performances in Philadelphia.

== Funds raised ==
According to Peca Popović, the funds raised from the sales of the "Za milion godina" single were US$256,000 and further US$170,000 from the concert tickets, for a grand total of US$426,000.

== Legacy ==
In 2007, Serbian critic Dimitrije Vojnov named "Za milion godina" one of ten most important records in the history of Yugoslav rock music, writing:

This project is one of the best indicators of how vibrant Yugoslav rock scene used to be because, with it, our pop and rock performers managed to start a relevant charity campaign and join a global movement that featured representatives from the developed [musical] scenes globally. Today, it would be completely absurd to gather our performers of this genre and expect them to articulate something which could be notable at the local level at least. [...] In the video [...] everybody is smiling and dancing, and no one's face indicates what would happen to us soon after. Besides political unity [in Yugoslavia], this video shows the unity of the [musical] scene, where [highly commercial] Bijelo Dugme isn't strictly and militantly separated from [more artistic] Idoli, which is what would later happen, when all other separations also become militant. In extreme case, this project remains a symbol of the time when we were helping the people in need, and several years later we would become the ones receiving aid from charity projects of this type.

In 2011, Mladen Popović made a similar statement for the documentary series Rockovnik:

It was significant that, at the time, we were the ones helping the people in need, and, unfortunately, only several years later, it was us receiving [humanitarian] aid from the world.

The piano version of "Za milion godina" appeared at the end of the last episode of Rockovnik series, where it follows footage of former Yugoslav rock acts.

In 2020, in the midst of COVID-19 pandemic, a group of public figures from Serbia recorded a new version of the song, accompanied by the message "Be a Hero, Stay at Home". The participants included musicians Aleksandra Radović, Sergej Ćetković, Aleksandra Kovač, Zoran Živanović and Jelena Galonić, Bojana Stamenov, Dženan Lončarević, Nevena Božović, Ivana Peters, Goran Šepa, Nenad Milosavljević, Tijana Bogićević, Lena Kovačević, Zoran "Kiki" Lesendrić, Bilja Krstić, Ana Stanić, Leontina Vukomanović and Tijana Dapčević, actors Gordan Kičić, Nebojša Milovanović, Marko Živić (who would himself die from COVID-19 in October 2021) and Gorica Popović, alongside other musicians and actors.

"Za milion godina" was heavily used during 2024–2025 Serbian anti-corruption protests, performed by choirs and played on a number of protests across Serbia. Generacija 5 members publicly supported the protests, and Ilić stated about the usage of the song:

It isn't accidental that the song became "active" it its glory on its 40th anniversary. It started to live its new life spontaneously, as a symbol of a new battle, led primarily by students in their magnificent fervour, together with the citizens joining them.

== See also ==
- Popular music in the Socialist Federal Republic of Yugoslavia
- Live Aid
