= Bel Tempo =

- Bel Tempo: Vladimir Petričević (left) and Suzana Petričević (right)

Background information
- Origin: Belgrade, SR Serbia, SFR Yugoslavia
- Genres: Pop rock; smooth jazz; jazz pop
- Years active: 1986–1992 (Reunions: 1996)
- Labels: PGP-RTB
- Past members: Vladimir Petričević; Suzana Petričević

Bel Tempo (Serbian Cyrillic: Бел Темпо, transliteration for Belle Tempo, Italian for Nice Weather) was a Serbian and Yugoslav musical duo formed in Belgrade in 1986 and consisting of siblings Vladimir Petričević (guitar, keyboards and vocals) and Suzana Petričević (vocals).

At the time of Bel Tempo formation, Suzana Petričević had already gained prominence as a theatre actress. Their eponymous debut album, which featured the combination of pop rock and jazz, made them a prominent act of the Yugoslav rock scene. In 1992 the duo released their second album, Modesty, featuring similar sound, ending their activity soon after. They had made only one brief reunion, appearing on the 1996 MESAM festival.

== History ==
=== 1986–1992 ===
Bel Tempo was formed in 1986 in Belgrade by siblings Vladimir "Vlada" Petričević (guitar, keyboards, vocals) and Suzana Petričević (vocals), children of trumpeter Momir Petričević, who played trumpet in the Belgrade National Theatre orchestra. The siblings chose the name for the duo after Bora Ćosić's play Bel Tempo. At the time of the band formation, Vladimir was 20 and Suzana was 27. Vladimir was studying philosophy, and Suzana had already graduated at the Belgrade Faculty of Dramatic Arts and had become an actress of the National Theatre in Belgrade, having also acted in Zvezdara Theatre and Atelje 212. She had her singing debut on Momčilo Bajagić's 1984 album Pozitivna geografija, with her guest appearance in the song "Papaline" ("Bristlings").

Initially the band rehearsed in the Boško Buha Theatre hall. They released their eponymous debut album in 1987 through PGP-RTB. Initially, PGP-RTB editors hesitated in publishing the album, perceiving its sound as non-commercial. The album featured pop rock sound combined with jazz, with some songs featuring brass section. All the songs were written by Vladimir, with the exception of the lyrics for the song "Povedi me" ("Take Me"), provided by Suzana. The album also featured the song "Zašto ne smem da te ljubim" ("Why I Can Not Kiss You"), a cover of a Hungarian romance. Bel Tempo was produced by Vladimir Racković (former leader of the acoustic rock band Odiseja), and featured Nenad Stefanović "Japanac" on bass guitar, Alekandar Ralev on keyboards, and Papa Nik on percussion. The album was better received by Zagreb audience than in Bel Tempo's home city of Belgrade, so the band often performed in Zagreb club Kulušić.

Due to Suzana Petričević's theatre obligations, the duo's second album appeared five years later, in 1992. The album was entitled Modesty, with its concept inspired by the comic character Modesty Blaise. The authors of the songs were both Vladimir and Suzana. The album featured Saša Lokner on keyboards, Aleksandar Jelić on bass guitar, Nenad Petrović on saxophone, and other musicians. After the album was released, Bel Tempo ended their activity, largely due to Suzana's pregnancy and the ongoing Yugoslav Civil War.

=== Post breakup ===
After Bel Tempo ended their activity, Suzana performed for a year in Belgrade jazz club Tabu. On these performances she was backed by Serbian jazz veterans Miša Blam, Miša Krstić, Miša Komnenić and Saša Radojčić. Vladimir started working as an editor on Radio Television of Serbia. Bel Tempo made a brief comeback to appear on the 1996 MESAM festival with the song "Ljubomora" ("Jealousy").

Following Bel Tempo's 1996 reunion, Vladimir wrote the songs "Budi mi drug" ("Be My Friend") and "Jedna pesma koju volim" ("A Song that I Love") for Marina Perazić's 1998 album Ista kao more (The Same as the Sea) and turned towards composing music for television, theatre and film. He wrote music for numerous Radio Television of Serbia shows. He wrote music for numerous feature and short films, most notably the films Goodbye in Chicago (1996), Virtual Reality, Doctor Ray and the Devils (2012) and From Love (2019). He composed music for numerous plays by National Theatre in Belgrade, Serbian National Theatre, National Theatre in Niš, Bitef Theatre, Zvezdara Theatre, Boško Buha Theatre, Pinocchio Puppet Theatre and other Serbian theatres. He worked as the music producer for the Belgrade National Theatre. He has received numerous awards for his work.

Suzana Petričević continued her acting career in theatre, on television and film, occasionally returning to music. Together with Zoran Erić she wrote music for the play Doctor Faustus, in which she played the role of God. With the song "Pusti me da spavam" ("Let Me Sleep") she appeared on the 1999 various artists album Proleće na trgu – Moj Beograd srce ima (A Spring at the Square – My Belgrade Has a Heart), featuring protest songs against NATO bombing of Yugoslavia. In 2004, she released a multimedia CD through PGP-RTS, the disc featuring her version of the song "Summertime", a video for the song and photographs. She appeared on the Beovizija 2004 festival with the song "Nikad više" ("Never Again").

== Discography ==
=== Studio albums ===
- Bel Tempo (1987)
- Modesty (1992)
