= Mirko Ilić =

American art director

Mirko Ilić (born 1 January 1956) is a Bosnian-born comics artist and graphic designer based in New York City.

== Yugoslavian period ==
Ilić was born in Bosnia and Herzegovina. His life, schooling and most of his Yugoslav-period-career was located at Zagreb, Croatia.

He graduated from the School of Applied Arts in Zagreb, published his first works in 1973, and has since been publishing comics and illustrations in magazines, such as Omladinski tjednik, Modra Lasta, Tina, Pitanja, and Start and has become the art and comics editor of the students' magazine Polet in 1976. That's when he organized an informal organization of the comic book creators Novi kvadrat (The New Square), that has been widely connected to the Novi val musical movement in Zagreb. Ilić design album covers of some of the most prominent Yugoslav bands of the time, such as Bijelo dugme, Prljavo kazalište, Parni Valjak, Azra, Film and many others. He designed the cover for the first album of Prljavo kazalište, which became a widely recognizable and iconic symbol for Punk rock in ex-Yugoslavia. He even wrote lyrics for the song Čovjek za sutra. Ilić appears in Sretno dijete, Igor Mirković's documentary about the Novi val (New wave) movement in Zagreb, as one of the most prominent figures of the movement. He also designed covers for the Croatian political weekly magazine Danas, as well as posters for theaters such as Teatar & TD and posters for movies. His most famous movie poster is for cult film Ko To Tamo Peva.

== International career ==
In 1977, Ilić started publishing his works in the established comics magazines outside Yugoslavia, such as Alter Alter, Métal Hurlant, Heavy Metal and Marvel's Epic Illustrated. In 1980, Novi kvadrat ceased to exist and Ilić entirely stopped working on the comics, and focused upon illustration and graphic design. In 1982, he started working for the Italian magazine Panorama.

== American period ==
In March 1986 he moved to New York. He started publishing his illustrations in Time, The New York Times, The Wall Street Journal, and many other prominent and influential newspapers and magazines. In 1991, he became an art director of Time International, and the following year he became art director of the op-ed in The New York Times.

In 1995 he founded Mirko Ilić Corp., a graphic design and 3-D computer graphics and motion picture title studio. In 1998, he created the title sequence for the romantic comedy You've Got Mail with Milton Glaser and Walter Bernard.

In 1999, Mirko Ilić Corp. began designing visual identities for luxury hotels and restaurants. Some of his hotel clients include The Time Hotel in New York City, The Joule Hotel in Dallas, TX, Casa Moderna Hotel in Miami, FL, and Alpina Gstaad in Switzerland. Some restaurant clients include Le Cirque and La Fonda Del Sol in New York City, "Summit" and "Play" at The Broadmoor Hotel in Colorado Springs, Charlie Palmer in Dallas, TX, and "The Seafood Bar", "Echo", "Flagler Stakehouse", and "HMF" at The Breakers (hotel) in Palm Beach Florida.

From 1999 until 2022, Ilić was a professor at the School of Visual Arts for their MFA in Illustration program. In 2023 Ilić received an honorary title as university professor from MOME, The Moholy-Nagy University of Art and Design in Budapest, Hungary.

In 2012, Print published his monograph by Dejan Kršić with preface by Milton Glaser and introduction by Steven Heller.

In 2015, 38 pieces of his artwork were included in the collection of the Museum of Modern Art (MoMA). MoMA acquired artwork including posters, LP designs from his Yugoslavian period, and his designs of The New York Times OP-ED pages. In September 2015, four of his pieces were exhibited for the first time in MoMA's exhibition Making Music Modern.

His work is also in collections of Smithsonian Institution, San Francisco Museum of Modern Art, and many other institutions and museums.

His original illustrations for the covers of Time Magazine, among other pieces are a part of the Smithsonian National Portrait Gallery in Washington D.C.

Since 2017, Ilić is the creator and organizer of the Tolerance Traveling Poster Show, an international exhibition that brings together leading designers from around the world to create posters on the topic of Tolerance. Past participating designers have included Milton Glaser, Paula Scher, Ralph Steadman, David Hillman, and Gunter Rambow, among others. To date, the show was exhibited over 216 times in 50 different countries. In 2019 he established the Tolerance Project Inc., a non for profit organization.

== Books about graphic design ==
Ilić is a co-author of several notable books about graphic design.

Co-authored with Steve Heller:

- Genius Moves: 100 Icons of Graphic Design
- Handwritten - expressive lettering in digital age
- Anatomy of Design
- Stop Think Go Do
- Lettering Large: Art & Design of Monumental Typography
- Presenting Shakespeare: 1,100 Posters from Around the World
- Head To Toe: The Nude in Graphic Design
- Milton Glaser: POP

Co-authored with Milton Glaser:

- Design of Dissent
- Design of Dissent - Expanded Edition

== See also ==
- Yugoslav rock
- New wave music in Yugoslavia
- Punk rock in Yugoslavia
