= Marina Perazić =

Croatian pop-rock singer (born 1958)

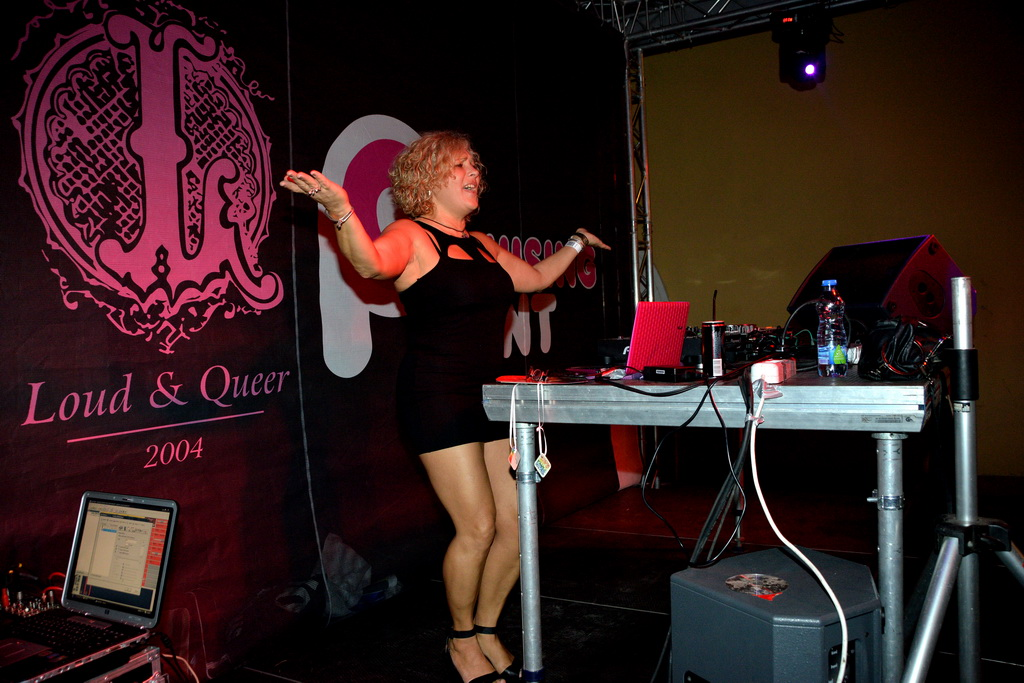
- Perazić performing a DJ set at the 2012 Exit festival.

Background information
- Born: 29 May 1958 (age 68); Rijeka, PR Croatia, FPR Yugoslavia
- Genres: Synth-pop; pop rock; electronic music
- Occupations: Singer; songwriter; DJ
- Instrument: Vocals
- Years active: 1981–present
- Labels: Jugoton; City Records; Dancing Bear
- Formerly of: Denis & Denis

Marina Perazić (born 29 May 1958) is a Croatian and former Yugoslav singer and DJ. Born in Rijeka, she gained prominence as a member of the synth-pop group Denis & Denis, which she formed with keyboardist and vocalist Davor Tolja, the two later joined by vocalist Edi Kraljić. As a member of Denis & Denis, Perazić gained nationwide popularity, becoming one of the biggest stars of the Yugoslav rock scene and often being described as a sex symbol. In 1986, she left Denis & Denis to start her solo career.

After releasing her debut album Marina in 1987, she moved to New York City, where she spent the following ten years without recording or performing. She returned to Rijeka in the late 1990s, releasing her second and latest solo album Ista kao more in 1998. Since the 2010s, she has been performing as a DJ. From 2012 to 2026, she took part in Denis & Denis reunions.

== Musical career ==
=== Early career ===
Marina Perazić started her singing career as a member of the Rijeka choir Jeka Primorja (Echo of the Coastline) and the multimedia group Sigma Tau. In 1981, she was invited by Davor Tolja, former member of the bands Vrijeme i Zemlja and Linija 32 (Line 32), to join his one-off band Toljina Funk Selekcija (Tolja's Funk Selection), formed to perform on the 1981 edition of RI Rock Festival. Perazić was at the time a civil engineering student. After Toljina Funk Selekcija disbanded, Tolja and Perazić recorded the song "Zimski vjetar" ("Winter Wind") with chanson singer Damir Pandur for the Zagreb Music Festival. Tolja played and did the arrangements for the song, and Perazić recorded backing vocals, which was her first studio recording. The song was released on the festival's official compilation album ZagrebFest – Šansone (ZagrebFest – Chansons) in 1982.

=== Denis & Denis (1982–1986) ===
In 1982, Tolja and Perazić formed the synth-pop duo Denis & Denis. They attracted large attention of the Yugoslav audience with their demo recordings broadcast on radio stations in Rijeka, Zagreb and Belgrade. The duo had their first live performance on 30 December 1982, appearing as the opening band at Boa's concert in Rijeka's Youth Hall. In 1984, they released their debut album, Čuvaj se! (Take Care!). Čuvaj se! brought praises of the Yugoslav music press and nationwide popularity to the group with its radiophonic songs and sexually suggestive vocals of Perazić, who was often being described by the Yugoslav press as a sex symbol. During 1985, Tolja was serving his mandatory stint in the Yugoslav army, and during his military leaves, he and Perazić recorded the mini-album Ja sam lažljiva (I Am Mendacious), which repeated the commercial and critical success of the band's debut. On promotional performances, Tolja's former Linija 32 bandmate Edi Kraljić stepped in as the replacement for Tolja, and also appeared in promotional videos recorded for the songs from the album. During 1985, Perazić also starred, alongside Kraljić, in the science fiction TV film Denis & Denis, directed by Dinko Tucaković, recorded the song "Plava jutra" ("Blue Mornings") with Rex Ilusivii, and took part in YU Rock Misija project, a Yugoslav contribution to Live Aid, contributing vocals to the song "Za milion godina". After Tolja's return from the army, Denis & Denis would continue as a trio, consisting of Tolja, Perazić and Kraljić. In 1986, Perazić debuted as a solo artist by performing the song "Ljubi me, ljubi" ("Kiss Me, Kiss") on the MESAM festival. After the group's several successful appearances on Yugoslav pop music festivals, Perazić left Denis & Denis in September 1986 to start her solo career.

=== Solo career (1987–1988, 1997–present) ===
In 1987, Perazić released her first solo album, entitled simply Marina, written and recorded with a large number of collaborators. The songs were composed by Srđan Jul, Zoran Aničić, Zoran "Kiki" Lesendrić (of Piloti), Zoran Funčić (formerly of Xenia) and Miloš Kozić (of Ruž), and part of the lyrics was written by Marina Tucaković and Alka Vuica. The album was produced by Mato Došen, and the musicians who took part in the recording included Branko Bogunović (guitar), Vedran Božić (guitar), Hrvoje Grčević (bass guitar) and Ozren Depolo (saxophone). The album brought nationwide hits "Kolačići" ("Cookies"), composed by Lesendrić, and "U ritmu me okreni" ("Turn Me Around in Rhythm"), composed by Aničić. After the release of the album, she performed mostly in Yugoslav discoteques. In 1987, Perazić also appeared on the MESAM festival, performing the song "Dignimo ruke do oblaka" ("Let's Raise Our Hands to the Clouds"), the audience awarding her with the second place.

In 1988, she moved to New York with her husband Ivan Fece "Firchie" (former drummer of the band Ekatarina Velika). For the following ten years, she did not record and perform. After her divorce in 1997, she returned to Rijeka, choosing Belgrade as her career base.

She worked on her second studio album with songwriters and musicians from both Rijeka and Belgrade. The songs were composed by Davor Tolja, Kiki Lesendrić, Damir Urban, Dragan Ilić (of Generacija 5), Zorko Opačić and Miro Tešević (formerly of Fit), Miodrag "Bata" Kostić (formerly of YU Grupa), Vladimir Petričević (formerly of Bel Tempo), Zoran Cerar (formerly of TV Moroni) and Ivanko Rosić. The album was produced by Voja Aralica and recorded by studio musicians, with the exception of the Lesendrić's song "San za jedan dan" ("A Dream for a Day"), recorded by the members of Piloti. The album was entitled Ista kao more (The Same as the Sea), after the 1973 Indexi song "Budi kao more" ("Be like the Sea"), covered by Perazić for the album.

In 2004, Perazić issued her latest release, the CD single featuring techno song "Sex bez dodira" ("Sex without Touch") and the new version of the song "Pogledaj, sve zvijezde padaju" ("Look, All the Stars Are Falling"), written by Srđan Jul and originally recorded for her 1987 debut album. During the following years, she performed in clubs across the region. In the 2010s, Perazić started performing as a DJ.

=== Denis & Denis reunion (2012–2026) ===
In 2012, Tolja, Perazić and Kraljić reunited in order to mark 30 years since the band's formation. The reunited Denis & Denis also featured a new vocalist, young singer Ruby Montanari Knez. The reunited group held their first performance on 7 December 2012 in Tvornica kulture hall in Zagreb, and on the New Year's Eve they held a concert on Rijeka main city square, which was followed by concerts in the region.

During the following years, Tolja and Perazić had made occasional live appearances ad Denis & Denis. In January 2026, the two announced that Denis & Denis will do their final concerts as a part of the Posljednji program tvog kompjutera (The Last Program of Your Computer) tour. The tour included dates in Slovenia, Croatia and Serbia. It began on 14 March in Ljubljana and ended on 10 April 2026 in Zagreb.

== Other activities ==
Perazić made a cameo appearance in the Croatian TV series Black & White World portraying a journalist. She participated in the reality TV show Farma, both in the Serbian and the Croatian versions.

== Personal life ==
In her public appearances more than twenty years after the events in question, Perazić revealed that she had briefly dated the Riblja Čorba guitarist Momčilo Bajagić during early-to-mid 1980s and further claimed his hit ballad "Kad hodaš" (off Riblja Čorba's 1984 studio album Večeras vas zabavljaju muzičari koji piju) had been inspired by their relationship. For his part, Bajagić never publicly confirmed nor denied the relationship with Perazić, however, he did explicitly deny that he had written "Kad hodaš" with her in mind.

In 1986, Perazić began a relationship with the musician Ivan "Firchie" Fece, best known as one-time Ekatarina Velika drummer. Having already met three years earlier at Subotica's Youth Festival, the two began dating following an encounter at the 1986 MESAM festival in Belgrade's Sava Centar and moved in together only weeks later. In 1988, Fece emigrated to the United States, settling in New York City, and Perazić soon joined him thereby giving up on her solo music career in Yugoslavia. Their first child, daughter Mia Katarina, was born in 1993. Two years later, they had another daughter, Luna Maria. The couple's co habitual relationship was reportedly a turbulent one, with Perazić accusing Fece of verbal and physical abuse. It ended in 1996, with Perazić leaving New York City with their two infant daughters and moving back to her hometown Rijeka.

She was in a relationship with pop singer Vlado Georgiev.

== Legacy ==
Denis & Denis song "Program tvog kompjutera" was covered by Croatian alternative rock band Gipps on their 1997 album Uh!. The group's song "Voli me još ovu noć" was covered by Croatian klapa Libar on their 2008 album Prvi (The First One). The same song was covered by Croatian singers Carla Belovari and Bojan Jambrošić on the 2013 album Zapisano u zvijezdama (Written in the Stars). Perazić's song "Kolačići" was covered by sister singers Ivana and Marija Husar on their 2007 album Familija (Family).

In 2015, Čuvaj se! was polled No.65 on the list of 100 Greatest Yugoslav Albums published by the Croatian edition of Rolling Stone.

In 2006, "Program tvog kompjutera" was polled No.77 on the B92 Top 100 Yugoslav songs list.

== Discography ==
=== With Denis & Denis ===
==== Studio albums ====
- Čuvaj se! (1984)
- Ja sam lažljiva (1985)

==== Singles ====
- "Program tvog kompjutera" / "Noć" (1984)
- "Oaze snova" / "Voli me još ovu noć" (1985)

=== Solo ===
==== Studio albums ====
- Marina (1987)
- Ista kao more (1998)

=== Singles ===
- "Sex bez dodira" (2004)
