= Suzana Petričević =

Serbian actress and singer (born 1959)

- Born: 16 February 1959 (age 67); Šibenik, PR Croatia, FPR Yugoslavia
- Genres: Pop rock, jazz
- Occupations: Actress, singer
- Years active: 1984–present
- Label: PGP-RTB
- Formerly of: Bel Tempo

Suzana Petričević (Serbian Cyrillic: Сузана Петричевић, born 16 February 1959) is a Serbian actress and singer.

== Acting career ==
Suzana Petričević graduated from the Belgrade Drama Arts Academy on the Department for Actors. She became a member of the National Theatre in Belgrade in 1982.

She received the Award for Best Acting Achievement of the National Theatre in 1999 for her role in play Suze su OK (Tears are OK); The Award at Festival of Monodrama and Pantomimes in Zemun (Belgrade) for the role of Gocili in play Poslednja Šansa (The Last Chance); The Award of Festival of Monodrama in Sarajevo (Bosnia and Herzegovina).

=== Plays ===
National Theatre in Belgrade	Role
Kabare kod B.Brehta	Nana
Krticnjak	Vesna
Kostana	Kostana
Zene u narodnoj skupstini	Erinija
Veciti mladozenja	Bela
Vestice iz Salema	Ana Patnem
Posle milion godina	Svetlana
Poslednja bitka	Jefimija
Trojanke	Kasandra
Suze su O.K.	Nadja
Faust	Gospod
Faust II	Gospod
Putujuce pozoriste Sopalovic	Gina
Kostana	Salce
Opasne veze/Kvartet	Emili

Atelje 212
Bel Tempo	Gosca
Optuzeni Pera Todorovic	Advokat
Caplja	Vanjuska

Bosko Buha
Stara prodavnica retkosti	Anny

Zvezdara teatar
Hamlet u Mrdusi donjoj	Andjelija

Pozorište Duško Radović
Blazenstvo	Ninicka

Pozorište Dvorište
Venecijanke	Nena

Bitef Teatar
Budite Lady za jedan dan	Billie Holiday

UK Vuk Karadžić
Poslednja šansa	Gocili

=== Filmography ===
- Boj na Kosovu (Andja)
- 13.jul (Verica)
- Da cappo (Marja)
- Protestni album (Goca)
- Prepolovljeni (Branka)
- S. O. S. - Spasite naše duše (Nives)
- Absurdistan (Eleni)
- Selo gori, a baba se češlja (Cveta)

== Music career ==
She graduated from the music school Kosta Manojlović in Belgrade. She had her singing debut in the song "Papaline" released on Momčilo Bajagić's album Pozitivna geografija. In 1986, she formed the pop rock duo Bel Tempo with her brother Vladimir Petričević. Their debut self-titled album was published by PGP-RTB on December 10, 1987. Their second album, Modesty was released on the April 15, 1992, released by PGP-RTB. After Modesty was released they ended their activity, making only a brief comeback with the song "Ljubomora" on the 1996 MESAM festival.

=== Discography ===
==== With Bel Tempo ====
===== Studio albums =====
- Bel Tempo (1987)
- Modesty (1992)

===== Singles =====
- "Ljubomora" (1996)

== Personal life ==
Petričević lives in Belgrade with her daughter Dorotea.
