= Samonikli =

Yugoslav rock group active 1964–1969

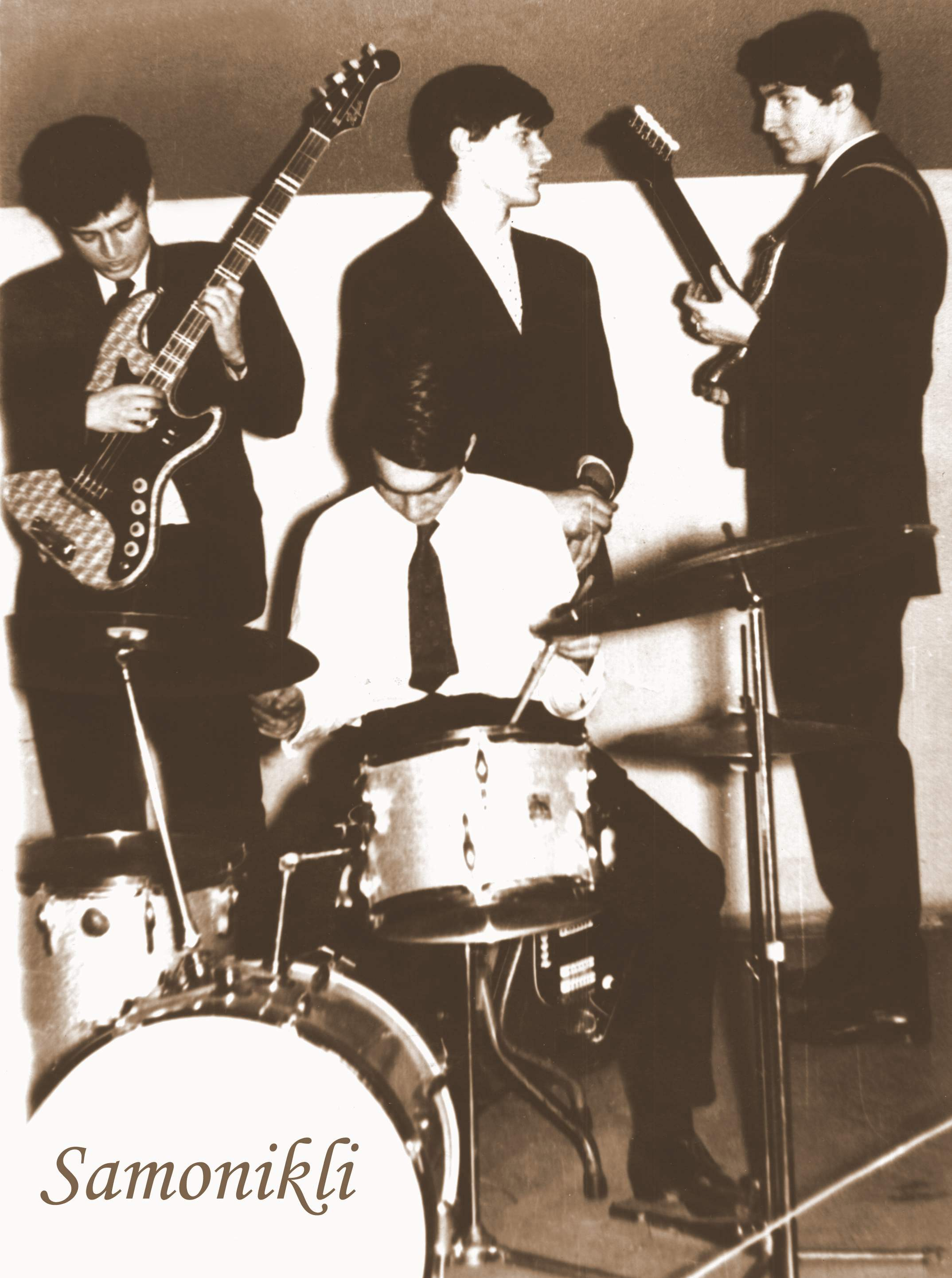
- Samonikli, standing, from left to right: Marko Novaković, Milan Pavlov, Bojan Drndić; sitting: Vukašin Veljković

Background information
- Origin: Belgrade, SR Serbia, SFR Yugoslavia
- Genres: Beat music; rock; folk rock; instrumental rock; soul
- Years active: 1963–1969 (Reunions: 1985, 2003, 2005, 2006)
- Past members: Milan Pavlov; Marko Novaković; Bojan Drndić; Vukašin Veljković; Branislav Grujić; Slobodan Matijević; Aleksandar Marinković; Karlo Krajp

Samonikli (Serbian Cyrillic: Самоникли, trans. The Indigenous Ones) were a Yugoslav rock band formed in Belgrade in 1963. Despite having no official releases, the band made a number of recordings for Yugoslav radio and television and are notable for being among the pioneers of the Yugoslav rock scene.

== History ==
=== 1964-1969 ===
The band Samonikli was formed in 1963. They chose their name after a book of short stories by Slovene writer Prežihov Voranc. Initially, the band held rehearsals at Belgrade's Center for Culture and Arts Nikola Tesla. Group members changed frequently in the early period, but by 1966 they stabilized in the following lineup: Milan Pavlov (guitar), Marko Novaković (bass guitar), Bojan Drndić (rhythm guitar), and Vukašin Veljković (drums).

Initially, the band performed at school and college dances. They covered beat hits, as well as traditional songs and 1930s and 1940s schlagers, often introducing elements of jazz into these covers, while their original songs were mostly The Shadows-inspired instrumentals. During 1965 and 1966 they played regularly at dances at Belgrade Faculty of Technology and Cultural Center Vuk Karadžić, with brothers Marin and Nikola Pečjak often performing with them as vocalists. The group became widely popular, with their performances at the Faculty of Technology usually attended by 700 to 800 young people. In 1966, they won the battle of the bands festival Majski susreti VIS-ova Jugoslavije (May Meetings of Vocal-Instrumental Ensembles of Yugoslavia), thus being chosen by the League of Socialist Youth of Yugoslavia as the country's representatives at an international Festival of Youth Orchestras in Hungary. Samonikli performed on the Budapest's People's Stadium alongside well-known Eastern European bands Illés, Metró, Omega, and others, themselves being viewed as a "Western" group and thus not participating in the competition of the groups.

At the end of 1966, they were joined by the drummer Branislav Grujić, a former member of Smeli (The Brave Ones). This lineup held regular performances at Belgrade Youth Center with vocalist Karlo Klemenčić. The band recorded several songs for Radio Belgrade. For the recording of the songs "Dozvoljavate li gospodine" ("Do You Allow, Sir") and "Povetarac i ja" ("The Breeze and I"), the latter of which became a hit on a popular Radio Belgrade music program called Muzički automat (Music Automaton), the band worked with six violinists, being one of the rare Yugoslav bands at the time to include bowed string instruments into their sound. Their recordings were featured in many popular radio programs, most notably Nedeljom u devet i pet (Sunday at 9:05). They were featured in a very popular series of shows on Television Belgrade called Koncert za ludi mladi svet (Concert for a Young and Crazy World) twice, with the songs "Viđaju te s njim" ("They're Seeing You with Him") and "Da li vidiš" ("Can You See").

However, in the late 1960s the audience's interest in their performances faded, and the Yugoslav music press described their sound as archaic. The band turned towards polyphonic singing, and the group changed eight different drummers, before they were eventually joined by former Batali (Forget About It) drummer Slobodan "Dina" Matijević. They moved towards more contemporary repertoire, adding an organist and including covers of The Jimi Hendrix Experience and other contemporary rock acts' songs into the set list. Eventually, the band was joined by trombonist Aleksandar Marinković and saxophone player Karlo Krajp, including covers of popular soul songs into the set list. During the last period of their activity, they performed as a backing band for popular singers Bisera Veletanlić, Gordana Krisper, Miki Jevremović and others. In interviews, the band announced that they are working on the songs for their first official release; however, their efforts failed, and the band disbanded in 1969.

=== Post breakup ===
In December 1985, Samonikli reunited to play in Belgrade's Trade Union Hall, along with other popular 1960s groups, at a commemorative concert marking the 25th anniversary of rock music in Belgrade. In 2003, marking their 40th anniversary, Samonikli held a dance concert for their friends and fans at the Duga club in Belgrade, returning to their instrumental music. In 2005 and 2006 they held two dance concerts for their fans in Belgrade's Park restaurant.

Marko Novaković died on 7 September 2010. Vukašin Veljković died on 29 January 2013.

== Recordings ==
Through the years, Samonikli made a number of recordings for radio and television shows. Some of the recordings include:

- "Povetarac i ja" ("The Breeze and I", Radio Belgrade)
- "Dozvoljavate li gospodine" ("Do You Allow, Sir", Radio Belgrade)
- "Usamljena gitara" ("Lonely Guitar", Radio Belgrade)
- "Ne ustupam vam svoje mesto" ("I Won't Give You My Seat", Radio Belgrade)
- "Gde su ruže nestale" ("Where Did All the Roses Go", Radio Belgrade)
- "Massachusetts" (Radio Belgrade)
- "Mene moja nana" ("My Mom", Radio Belgrade)
- "Izgubljena ljubav" ("Lost Love", Radio Belgrade)
- "Budi se Istok i Zapad" ("The East and West Awaken", Radio Belgrade)
- "Heroj Tito" ("Hero Tito", Radio Belgrade)
- "Napisao sam volim te u pesku" ("I Wrote I Love You in the Sand", Television Belgrade)
- "Takav čovek" ("That Sort of Man", TV Belgrade)
- "Viđaju te s njim" ("They're Seeing You with Him", TV Belgrade)
- "Da li vidiš" ("Can You See", TV Belgrade)

No Samonikli recordings were ever officially released on vinyl record or any other format.
