= Sretno dijete =

- Directed by: Igor Mirković
- Produced by: Rajko Grlić
- Starring: Igor Mirković; Davorin Bogović; Vlada Divljan; Srđan Gojković; Jasenko Houra; Mirko Ilić; Maks Juričić
- Cinematography: Silvestar Kolbas; Domagoj Lozina
- Edited by: Ivana Fumić
- Music by: Prljavo kazalište Film; Azra; Električni orgazam Haustor; Idoli; Pankrti
- Distributed by: Gerila DV film
- Release date: July 23, 2003 (Pula Film Festival)
- Running time: 97 minutes
- Country: Croatia
- Language: Croatian

Sretno dijete (English: Happy child) is a Croatian documentary film directed by Igor Mirković, and produced by Rajko Grlić, an Ohio University professor of film, in 2003. The film is a nostalgic autobiographical overview of the author's adolescence in SR Croatia in the former Socialist Federal Republic of Yugoslavia during the late 1970s and early 1980s which corresponded with the emergence of the Yugoslav punk rock and new wave scenes, both which the author affiliated to, thus turning this film into a rockumentary. The film features interviews and rare footage of some of the top former Yugoslav rock acts ever such as: Azra, Film and Haustor from the author's hometown Zagreb, Croatia where most of the story takes place; then members of Električni orgazam and Idoli whom the author visits in Belgrade, Serbia; as well as Pankrti and Buldožer from Ljubljana, Slovenia. Beside materials filmed around former Yugoslavia, the film also contains interviews with important former Yugoslav artists who currently live abroad. For example, Darko Rundek is interviewed in Paris, France, Mirko Ilić in New York City in the United States, and there are also scenes shot on locations in the Netherlands, Germany, Hungary and other countries. The film is named after a song by Prljavo kazalište from their first self-titled album.

== See also ==
- Yugonostalgia
- New wave music in Yugoslavia
- SFR Yugoslav pop and rock scene
- Cinema of Croatia
