= Xenia (band) =

Yugoslav pop rock band

- Origin: Rijeka, SR Croatia, Yugoslavia
- Genres: Pop rock
- Years active: 1981–1985
- Labels: Jugoton; Croatia Records (comps.)
- Past members: Vesna Vrandečić; Robert Funčić; Marinko Radetić; Joško Serdarević

Xenia was a Yugoslav pop rock band from Rijeka, active from 1981 to 1985. Their discography includes two 7-inch singles singles and two studio albums.

== Biography ==
The band was formed in 1981 by Vesna Vrandečić and Robert Funčić. Their debut album Kad nedjelja prođe (When Sunday's Over) was recorded in Tira Recording Studio in Torsby, Sweden, produced by Tihomir Varga, and was released by Jugoton. The two biggest hits from this album were Iznenadi me and Moja prijateljica. The line-up on this album was: Vesna Vrandečić (vocals), Robert Funčić (guitar), Marinko Radetić (bass) and Joško Serdarević (drums). In 1998, Kad nedjelja prođe was voted the 89^{th} greatest album of Yugoslav pop and rock music by the critics in the book YU 100: najbolji albumi jugoslovenske rok i pop muzike.

The second album, titled Tko je to učinio? (Who Did It?) was recorded in JM Sound studio in Zagreb and produced by Vedran Božić. It was released by Jugoton in 1984. All the songs were composed by Robert Funčić and the original line-up was kept. This album brought their greatest hit Troje (with two different music videos), and other notable songs Svejedno and Sasvim slučajno. Troje was voted the 73^{rd} best Yugoslav song of all time by radio B92 in 2006.

The band disbanded in 1985 with only two studio albums released, but is considered one of the most important representatives of the Yugoslav rock music of the '80s. Croatia Records rereleased their two studio albums as a compilation in February 2010.

== Legacy ==
The album Kad nedjelja prođe was polled in 1998 as 89^{th} on the list of 100 greatest Yugoslav popular music albums in the book YU 100: najbolji albumi jugoslovenske rok i pop muzike (YU 100: The Best albums of Yugoslav pop and rock music). In 2006 the song Troje was ranked #73 on the B92 Top 100 Domestic Songs list.

== Discography ==
=== Studio albums ===
- Kad nedjelja prođe (Jugoton, 1983)
- Tko je to učinio? (Jugoton, 1984)

=== Compilations ===
- 2 na 1 Collection (Croatia Records, 2010)

=== Singles ===
- Moja prijateljica/Povezi me (Jugoton, 1982)
- Troje/Zadnji put (1983)
