= Boa... Nguu yak! =

- Theatrical release poster
- Directed by: Chaninton Muangsuwan
- Written by: Chalart Sriwanda; Manop Udomdej
- Produced by: Manop Udomdej; Somsak Techaratanaprasert
- Starring: Pimpan Chalaikupp; Sittha Lertsrimonkol; Kiratikorn Ratkulthorn
- Cinematography: Thanut Kruewan
- Edited by: Manop Udomdej
- Music by: Phatai Puangjeen
- Production company: Sahamongkol Film International
- Release date: April 27, 2006
- Running time: 95 minutes
- Country: Thailand
- Language: Thai
- Box office: $302,950

Boa... Nguu yak! also known as just Boa and Constrictor, is a 2006 Thai horror monster film directed by Chaninton Muangsuwan and stars Pimpan Chalaikupp and Sittha Lertsrimonkol.

== Synopsis ==
A group of teenagers journey by balloon to a remote forest in search of a friend who's gone missing after his trip that he took for a film project. En route, a brutal storm takes them down in the middle of the forest. The teenagers are forced to take shelter in a dark cave, unaware that an unusual creature is silently resting there. It is not too long before they discover the terrible thing deep inside the cave, a ferocious and enormous Boa. They have no choice but to fight for their lives.

== Cast ==
- Pimpan Chalaikupp as Nattacha
- Sittha Lertsrimonkol as Soet
- Kiratikorn Ratkulthorn as Phrae
- Nophand Boonyai as Khin
- Tawngrak Assawarat as Sida
- Phoophan Khannathap as Go

== Release ==
The film was released in Thailand on April 27, 2006, in the Philippines on November 1, 2006, and in Kuwait on October 8, 2009. As of 2018 there are no plans for it to be released in the United States.

== Reception ==
The film has received very negative reviews.

Robert Beveridge of Popcorn for Breakfast: "All the SFCOM markers are here. There’s bad CGI, awful script, generic cute chicks (and one who’s supposed to be the “plain” intelligent one who's actually hotter than the rest of the bunch: in this movie, that's Kiratikorn Ratkulthorn, in her first but hopefully not last film), monsters that do nothing you'd think they would do, etc.

AnimalAttack called the film average and gave it a score of 3 out of 6.

=== Box office ===
In its opening weekend in Thailand the film came in second at the box office grossing $167,154. In its second weekend the film dropped 74.8% and grossed $42,150. The film went on to gross $302,950.

== Home media ==
The film was released on DVD in Hungary on January 15, 2010, and was later released in France on July 20, 2010.

== See also ==
- List of killer snake films
