= Boa (album) =

Studio album by Boa
- Released: January 21, 1982
- Recorded: November–December 1981
- Studio: Tiva Recording Studios, Torsby
- Genre: New wave
- Length: 34:42
- Label: Suzy
- Producer: Tinnie Varga

Boa chronology
Boa (1982)	Ritam strasti (1982)

Boa is the debut album by the Croatian and former Yugoslav rock band, Boa. It was released in 1982.

== Track listing ==
Side one
No.	Title	Lyrics	Music	Length
1.	"Milion" (Million)	Slavko Remenarić	Boa	2:51
2.	"Stol" (The Table)	Remenarić	Mladen Puljiz	3:08
3.	"Davni trag" (The Ancient Trace)	Remenarić	Puljiz	3:52
4.	"Noćne sjene" (Night Shadows)	Remenarić	Boa	3:09
5.	"Melodrama" (Melodrama)	Željko Marković	Puljiz	4:43

Side two
No.	Title	Lyrics	Music	Length
1.	"Živjeti od mraka" (To Live on Darkness)	Remenarić	Puljiz	4:18
2.	"Na nišanu" (At Gunpoint)	Remenarić	Puljiz	3:22
3.	"Sela gore" (Villages are Burning)	Remenarić	Puljiz	4:08
4.	"Pored zida" (By the Wall)	Remenarić, Marković	Puljiz	5:08

== Personnel ==
- Mladen Puljiz: keyboards, synthesizers, lead vocals
- Slavko Remenarić: guitars, synth guitar, backing vocals
- Damir Košpić: bass, backing vocals
- Igor Šoštarić: drums, percussion
- Gunnar Bylinn: percussion
