= Music of Yugoslavia =

Overview of musical traditions in Yugoslavia

The music of Yugoslavia refers to music created during the existence of Yugoslavia, spanning the period between 1918 and 1992. The most significant music scene developed in the later period of the Socialist Federal Republic of Yugoslavia (SFR Yugoslavia), and includes internationally acclaimed artists such as: the alternative music acts Laibach and Disciplina Kičme which appeared on MTV; classical music artists such as Ivo Pogorelić and Stefan Milenković; folk artists such as the Roma music performer Esma Redžepova; the musicians of the YU Rock Misija contribution to Bob Geldof's Band Aid; the Eurovision Song Contest performers such as the 1989 winners Riva and Tereza Kesovija, who represented Monaco at the Eurovision Song Contest 1966 and her own country in 1972, and plenty of others.

== History ==
Different music genres rose, evolved, and declined at different times and in different places across and throughout the component republics of Yugoslavia. For example, Yugoslav punk and new wave rose in the late 1970s; disco, both foreign and "Yu-disco", was making inroads by the early 70s, with international stars such as Earth, Wind & Fire performing in Zagreb, Belgrade, and Ljubljana in 1975.

The communist government confiscated Edison Bell Penkala and Elektroton, companies that had been active in the interwar period, and used them to create the state-sponsored, Zagreb-based record label Jugoton in 1947. It became the largest Eastern European label outside of the USSR and was instrumental in the development of pop music in SFR Yugoslavia. From its founding in 1947 to 1953, it was under the direct purview of the Yugoslav Communist Party and produced classical, revolutionary, and tradition folk music repertoires in the tradition of social realism.

=== Disco ===
Yu-disco was heavily influenced by earlier genres, including jazz, funk, and rock; the Zagreb band, Clan, became combining disco with their earlier rock, while the Belgrade-based disco group Zdravo mixed funk with disco.

Disco also influenced the local entertainment and music industry, known as the estrada, including artists such as Zdravko Čolić.

=== Folk music ===
The post-war stance in Yugoslavia towards folklore, and with it folk music, was inspired by the Soviet ideals of a culture that was neither bourgeois nor peasant, but new. Many of the Yugoslav folk music that emerged at the beginning of the post-revolutionary period were seen as a reflection of the project of building an ideologically and physically new vision of Yugoslavia. In the 1970s, Belgrade, Zagreb, Ljubljana, and Sarajevo became major production centres of newly composed folk music, before the folk "market" fell off in 1983.

== Politics ==
During the Yugoslav Wars, music was at times used for militaristic and nationalistic purposes and as a form of violence; journalists documented instances where captives were forced to sing the nationalist songs of their captors.

== Categories ==
=== Music of SFR Yugoslavia ===
- SFR Yugoslav pop and rock scene - which includes pop music and rock music including all their genres and subgenres.
  - New wave music in Yugoslavia
  - Sarajevo school of pop rock
  - Punk rock in Yugoslavia
  - New Primitivism
  - Yu-Mex
  - YU Rock Misija
  - Yugoslavia in the Eurovision Song Contest
  - Novokomponovana narodna muzika or Novokomponirana narodna muzika - lit. 'newly composed folk music' (not including Turbofolk, which rose to popularity after the breakup of Yugoslavia)
- Narodna muzika - which includes traditional folk music, both rural and urban.
- Yugoslav Partisan songs

=== Record labels ===
- Jugoton (Zagreb, 1947)
- PGP-RTB (Belgrade, 1959)
- Diskos (Aleksandrovac, 1962)
- Helidon (Ljubljana, 1967)
- Jugodisk (Belgrade, 1968)
- Suzy (Zagreb, 1972)
- ZKP RTLJ (Ljubljana, 1974)
- Diskoton (Sarajevo, 1974)
- Sarajevo Disk (Sarajevo, 1978)

=== Ex-Yugoslav countries ===
For the music of the entities that emerged after the breakup of Yugoslavia in 1991 see:

- Music of Bosnia and Herzegovina
- Music of Croatia
- Music of Kosovo
- Music of Montenegro
- Music of North Macedonia
- Music of Serbia
  - Music of Vojvodina
- Music of Slovenia

== See also ==
- Yugoslavia in the Eurovision Song Contest
- Rock Express Top 100 Yugoslav Rock Songs of All Times
- YU 100: najbolji albumi jugoslovenske rok i pop muzike
- Kako (ni)je propao rokenrol u Srbiji
- B92 Top 100 Domestic Songs
- Ex YU rock enciklopedija 1960 - 2006
