= Popular music in Yugoslavia =

Popular music in Yugoslavia includes the pop and rock music of the former Socialist Federal Republic of Yugoslavia, including all their genres and subgenres. The scene included the constituent republics: SR Slovenia, SR Croatia, SR Bosnia and Herzegovina, SR Montenegro, SR Macedonia and SR Serbia and its subunits: SAP Vojvodina and SAP Kosovo. The pop and rock scene was a part of the general Music of Yugoslavia, which also included folk, classical music, jazz etc. Within Yugoslavia and internationally, the phrases ex-YU or ex-Yugoslav Pop and Rock both formally and informally generally to the SFRY period, though, in some cases, the Federal Republic of Yugoslavia is included, along with Serbia and Montenegro, which existed until 2006 (such as the book title Ex YU rock enciklopedija 1960 - 2006).

== History ==
Although sometimes considered as an Eastern Bloc country, the Socialist Federal Republic of Yugoslavia was a founding member of the Non-Aligned Movement and as such, it was far more open to western influences compared to the other socialist states. Yugoslavs enjoyed freedom of travel greater than that of other socialist states and had an easy access to Western popular culture. The western-influenced pop and rock music was socially accepted, the Yugoslav pop and rock music scene was well developed and covered in the media, which included numerous magazines, radio and TV shows. Numerous artists even played for president Josip Broz Tito himself, notably Bijelo Dugme, Zdravko Čolić and Rani Mraz. SFR Yugoslavia was the only communist country which was taking part in the Eurovision Song Contest. It joined in the 1961 contest even before some Western and NATO nations such as Portugal, Ireland, Greece and Turkey, which joined in 1964, 1965, 1974 and 1975 respectively.

=== 1940s ===
One of the first stars in the former Socialist Yugoslavia and one of its first internationally acclaimed artists, was the traditional pop singer Ivo Robić from Croatia, who emerged in the Yugoslav music scene in the late 1940s. Later, he went abroad, where he made a successful international career. He's claimed to have been the original performer of the Strangers in the Night song by Bert Kaempfert, predating Frank Sinatra who recorded his version later in 1966.

=== 1950s ===
The rock and roll scene in Yugoslavia started to emerge in the 1950s influenced by the classic rock and roll and rockabilly acts such as Elvis Presley, Chuck Berry, Bill Haley, Carl Perkins, Buddy Holly and others. Many young people started to play this new "electric music", as they called it, naming themselves "električari" (transl. electricians). One of the first who rose to prominence in this way was the guitarist Mile Lojpur from Belgrade (born in Zrenjanin in 1930). Many musicians later dedicated tributes to him, notably Nikola Čuturilo. Other eminent act that started in the 1950s rock 'n' roll scene was Karlo Metikoš from Zagreb, who after moving to Paris started an international career under the pseudonym Matt Collins. He recorded for Philips Records and had an opportunity to meet legends such as Jerry Lee Lewis and Paul Anka.

A notable singer who emerged in the late 1950s was Đorđe Marjanović, who became the first Yugoslav megastar.

=== 1960s ===
The beginning of the 1960s saw the emergence of numerous bands, many of them initially inspired by the then-popular Cliff Richard and The Shadows: in 1960 Uragani were formed in Rijeka, Bijele Strijele and Siluete, formed in 1961; the Zagreb-based Crveni Koralji and Belgrade's Zlatni Dečaci in 1962; in 1963 two other important Belgrade bands were formed, Samonikli and Crni Biseri, the latter featuring Vlada Janković-Džet, a prominent Yugoslav musician, who got his nickname after Jet Harris. The Zagreb-based Delfini were also formed the same year. After the British Invasion, many of these bands later moved on to British rhythm and blues. In Skopje, a popular 1960s rock 'n' roll group was formed named Bisbez who were considered "The Macedonian Beatles". They were formed by merging two already existing bands Biseri and Bezimeni.

The 1960s also saw the expansion of Beatlemania. Many new bands formed influenced by The Beatles or by the Rolling Stones, both of whom had large fanbases in SFR Yugoslavia. There were frequent arguments between the fans of both groups, though not necessarily violent. An important source of information for the youth to stay up-to-date with the rock music developments around the world was Radio Luxembourg. Certain British artists held concerts in Yugoslavia (e.g. The Searchers, The Hollies) and also Yugoslav artists performed around Europe, especially neighbouring Italy and Austria. On the border with Italy, several Yugoslav-Italian beat music festivals took place.

In the mid-1960s many bands such as Džentlmeni, Roboti and the reformed Siluete were influenced by the rhythm and blues artists, while others were more pop oriented. Mod oriented bands also emerged. The most popular foreign bands were The Animals, The Byrds, The Monkees, The Kinks, The Who, Manfred Mann and others. The garage rock sound (also labeled as "1960s Punk") was also popular. The charismatic frontman of Siluete, Zoran Miščević, became an idol of the new generation and a sex symbol. The band had a bad reputation for causing scandals and riots at their concerts. Their main rivals were the group Elipse, which, after getting a new vocalist, the African student from Congo Edi Dekeng, went on to play soul music.

The prominent Croatian singer Tereza Kesovija represented Monaco at the Eurovision Song Contest 1966.

One of the most eminent and influential former Yugoslav group formed in the 1960s was Indexi. They were formed in Sarajevo in 1962. In their early beginnings they were notably influenced by The Shadows and later by The Beatles. Along with the numerous evergreen songs they wrote featuring Davorin Popović's trademark nasal voice, they also covered the Beatles song "Nowhere Man". In some of their songs they also experimented with the sound in a similar way to Sgt. Pepper's Lonely Hearts Club Band. Indexi gradually moved to a more psychedelic sound, with more complex guitar and keyboard solos adding occasional folk and even classical music elements. One of the band's notable members Kornelije Kovač, left Indeksi to form another legendary band, Korni Grupa, in Belgrade in 1968.

As the end of the 1960s was approaching, the hippie movement expanded around the world as well as in SFR Yugoslavia. Notable group was the Croatian-based Grupa 220, which during a certain period featured Piko Stančić. Later he rose to one of the most important musicians, producers and arrangers in the whole former Yugoslav scene.

Under influences such as Bob Dylan and Joan Baez, many young people embraced the acoustic sound and thus were called "akustičari" (transl. acousticians) contrary to "električari". Prominent acoustic artist was Ivica Percl, formerly of Roboti. He was an acoustic musician and peace activist playing guitar and harmonica influenced by Bob Dylan and Donovan.

The year of 1968 was marked by youth protests around the world including massive student demonstrations in many cities all over SFR Yugoslavia.

Another popular act at the time was the group Ambasadori. One of the members of both Ambasadori and Korni Grupa was Zdravko Čolić, who went solo later and was acclaimed as the biggest pop star in the former Yugoslavia. The most notable female vocalist was Josipa Lisac who still enjoys huge popularity across the former SFR Yugoslavia. Boba Stefanović was one of the most prominent Yugoslav male solo vocalists.

The Hippie era was marked by the musical Hair. Numerous subsequent productions were staged around the world since its American debut in 1967, for example in Germany, France, Italy, Switzerland, Brazil, Argentina, Israel and Japan. The Yugoslav production was the first staged in a Socialist state, and it was highly praised by the Hair's original authors Gerome Ragni and James Rado, who were travelling from one country to another to watch each of the performances. As Ragni said, they found the Belgrade show "so beautiful, so spontaneous that we had to go right on the stage to share their enthusiasm". While being in Belgrade he also added "There exist no middle-class prejudices here".

==== Festivals ====
Many pop music festivals existed across SFR Yugoslavia including the Split Festival, Opatija Festival, Beogradsko proleće in Belgrade, Skopje Fest, Vaš šlager sezone in Sarajevo, and later also Makfest in Štip was established. The family-friendly pop music played at those festivals was comparable to older Eurovision Song Contests, the German schlager genre, the Italian Sanremo Music Festival or the adult oriented pop music category.

The specific Dalmatian pop sound featuring local folk elements performed at festivals held along the touristy Adriatic coast was very popular and some of its most notable exponents were Oliver Dragojević and Mišo Kovač. Dragojević's first performance was at the "Split Children's Festival" in 1961 with the song "Baloni". In a competition of amateur singers, his cult band from Split, "Batali" won first place for their rendition of "Yesterday", a Beatles classic. In 1972, Oliver went abroad to further develop his craft. He played in clubs across Germany, Sweden and Mexico. His solo singing career began in 1974 at the Split Festival, where he won with the song "Ča će mi Copacabana".

Oliver Dragojević, a Croatian pop star

A year later, composer Zdenko Runjić and Dragojević, released the song "Galeb i ja". It proved to be a big hit across the former SFR Yugoslavia and made Dragojević a household name. This was followed by hits "Romanca", "Oprosti mi, pape", "Stari morski vuk". Between 1975 and 1980, the Dragojević/Runjić duo dominated the music scene of the former SFR Yugoslavia. Part of the secret of their success was a third contributor, Jakša Fiamengo, who wrote the lyrics to some of Dragojević's most iconic songs, namely: "Nadalina", "Piva klapa ispod volta", "Karoca", "Ništa nova", "Infiša san u te", and "Ostavljam te samu". In 1990, Dragojević won the Split Festival with Ti is moj san, and got third place at the Yugoslav selection for the Eurovision Song Contest with the song Sreća je tamo gdje si ti, both in collaboration with Zorica Kondža. His style blended traditional klapa melodies of Dalmatia with jazz motifs wrapped up in a modern production. For his influential musical career, he reached critical and commercial acclaim in Yugoslavia and later Croatia, and his music continues to be popular today in the ex-Yugoslavian countries. Dragojević achieved numerous accolades, including numerous Porin and Indexi awards. He is one of the few Croatian musicians who performed at major international venues such as Carnegie Hall, Royal Albert Hall, L'Olympia and Sydney Opera House.

=== 1970s ===
The 1970s were marked by rock genres such as hard rock, progressive rock, jazz rock, art rock, glam rock, folk rock, symphonic rock, blues rock and boogie rock. In that period, some of the greatest Yugoslav stadium rock bands emerged: YU grupa, Time, Smak, Parni valjak, Atomsko Sklonište, Leb i Sol, Teška industrija and Galija.

In 1974 one of the most renowned rock groups ever formed in SFR Yugoslavia came to prominence, the Sarajevo based Bijelo Dugme, with Željko Bebek as its first singer.

Many foreign pop and rock stars visited Yugoslavia. In July 1970, the American rock band Blood, Sweat & Tears played five concerts across Yugoslavia, received in a subdued or indifferent fashion by the audiences. The 2023 documentary film What the Hell Happened to Blood, Sweat & Tears? shows footage from the Zagreb and Belgrade dates. Significant appearances include the Deep Purple concerts in Zagreb and Belgrade in 1975 with the local support acts Hobo and Smak in each of the cities respectively, and the Rolling Stones concert in Zagreb in 1976.

Several rock music festivals existed of which BOOM was one of the most popular. A rock music event that marked the decade, but also the Yugoslav rock history in general, was the Bijelo Dugme's concert at Hajdučka česma in Košutnjak Park in Belgrade on August 22, 1977, which was attended by around 80,000 people. (Parts of) the recorded material were released on the live album Koncert kod Hajdučke česme.

1975 saw the emergence of a very influential act, Buldožer from Slovenia, noted for its experimental rock, which was a reaction pointed against the musical scene of the time.

==== Singer-songwriters ====
The Yugoslav scene also featured several notable singer-songwriters, who emphasized their poetry over music, and usually performed accompanying themselves by an acoustic guitar or piano. Some of them were inspired by the French chanson or folk rock. One of the first critically acclaimed singer-songwriters was the Croatian artist Arsen Dedić who started his career in the 1960s and is still popular in his homeland and around the former Yugoslav countries, especially among the older generation. Another important author was also Đorđe Balašević from Novi Sad. He started his music career in the 1970s as a member of Žetva and Rani Mraz, before beginning a very successful solo career that continued up to his death in 2021. Despite being into acoustic rock initially, later he often used various elements of pop and rock often spiced up either with typical Vojvodinian humour or a ballad type of melancholy. A notable female artist in this category was Jadranka Stojaković from Sarajevo, Bosnia and Herzegovina. She was an author of the main music theme for the 1984 Winter Olympics held in Sarajevo. An artist notable for socially engaged lyrics was Marko Brecelj, formerly a member of Buldožer.

==== Disco ====
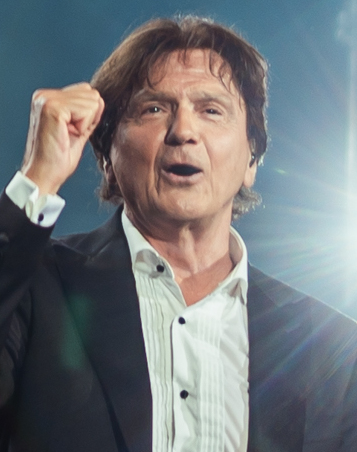
Zdravko Čolić, a former Yugoslav pop star

The disco craze spread around the world in the 1970s, conquering Yugoslavia as well. Similarly to the disco movie Saturday Night Fever, Zdravko Čolić became a sort of "Yugoslav John Travolta" dancing in stadiums across the country, dressed in a tight white suit and the then-fashionable bell-bottoms. At the legendary concert at the Belgrade stadium Marakana on September 5, 1978, about 70,000 people gathered to see him. The concert was also attended by representatives of a West German record label. Impressed by Čolić's popularity they offered him a record contract. He released the songs "Jedina" and "Zagrli me" for the Western German market and also an English language single featuring the songs "I'm not a Robot Man" and "Light Me". Čolić was offered to move to West Germany and start a career there, but he refused favouring the popularity he had at home. His song about a relationship with a posh girl "Pusti, Pusti modu" became a nationwide disco megahit in 1980. Despite that the disco fashion soon faded, Čolić continued his successful career as a pop music singer occasionally using folk music elements and remained popular in the former Yugoslav countries up to this day.

This era also brought in a one-hit wonder called Mirzino Jato, labeled by the media as kitschy euro disco band obviously influenced by Boney M., who were quite popular in Yugoslavia, especially after their only male member Bobby Farrell married a girl from Skopje's predominantly Romani inhabited municipality Šuto Orizari. Mirzino Jato's style encompassed the deep, subwoofer shaking voice of Sarajevo opera and classical choir singer Mirza Alijagić and the three back vocalists called "Jato" (English: Flock). Music was written and produced by Divlje Jagode guitarist Sead Lipovača, while the author of most lyrics was Marina Tucaković, who later wrote lyrics for other musical styles. Despite their huge popularity at the time, Mirzino Jato never got past the first album. Its only considerable hit was "Apsolutno tvoj".

One of the best known dance songs in this period was also the Dado Topić's opening track of the 1979 film Nacionalna klasa starring Dragan Nikolić as Floyd, the fanatic car racer.

==== Hard rock and heavy metal ====
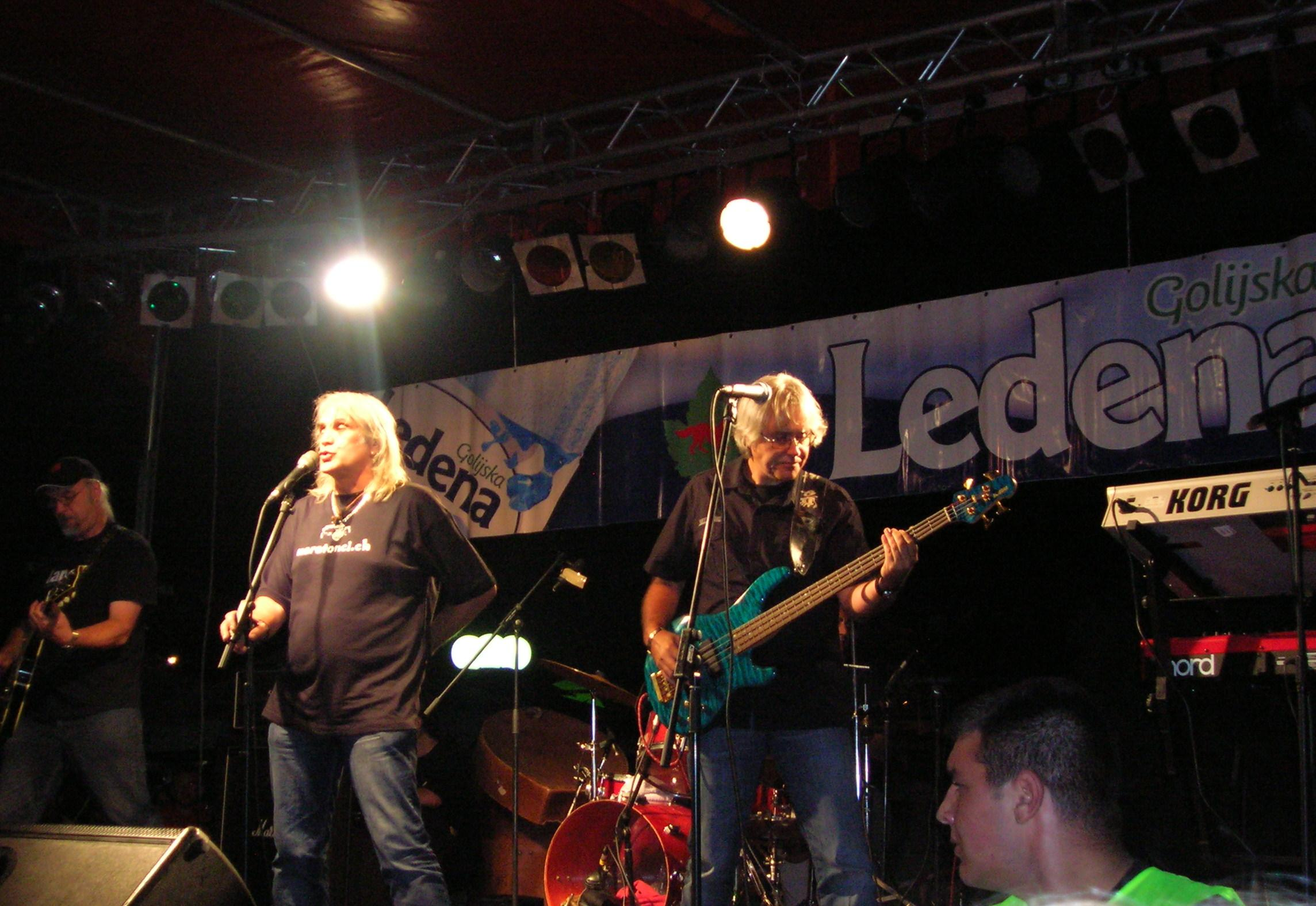
Riblja čorba in 2008.

Gordi were one of the first Yugoslav heavy metal bands and are considered one of the pioneers of classic heavy metal in Yugoslavia. Hard rock group Riblja Čorba, known for their provocative social-related lyrics and controversial political attitudes of the band's frontman Bora Đorđević was one of the most important groups of the Yugoslav and Serbian rock in general. Riblja Čorba drummer Vicko Milatović formed heavy metal band Warriors, which later moved to Canada and recorded an album for the foreign market. The eminent heavy metal group Divlje Jagode from Bihać, led by guitarist Sead "Zele" Lipovača started a short-lasting international career in 1987 under the name Wild Strawberries. Another notable Bosnian hard rock group was Vatreni Poljubac led by charismatic Milić Vukašinović, formerly a member of Bijelo Dugme. Other notable hard rock and heavy metal bands include Generacija 5, Rok Mašina, Kerber and Griva from Serbia; Atomsko sklonište, Osmi Putnik (whose frontman Zlatan Stipišić Gibonni, later started a successful pop music career) and Crna Udovica (later changed their name to Big Blue) from Croatia; Pomaranča from Slovenia, and others. Yugoslav glam metal scene featured few acts, most notable being Krom, Karizma and Osvajači.

==== Punk rock ====
The Yugoslav punk rock scene emerged in the late 1970s, influenced by the first wave of punk rock bands from the United Kingdom and United States, such as Sex Pistols and The Clash and others, but also the proto-punk bands such as MC5, The Stooges and New York Dolls. The DIY punkzine scene also started to develop. The Yugoslav punk bands were the first punk bands ever formed in a socialist state. Some of the first ones were formed in SR Slovenia and SR Croatia: Pankrti from Ljubljana (formed in 1977) and Paraf from Rijeka (depending on the source, formed in 1976 or 1977). The Slovenian and Croatian scene of that period is featured in the compilation album Novi Punk Val, compiled by Igor Vidmar. Late 1970s-early 1980s Belgrade scene included: Urbana Gerila, Radnička Kontrola and many others. This generation of bands was included on the Artistička Radna Akcija compilation. Pekinška Patka was a cult band coming from Novi Sad. Some of the notable punk bands in SR Macedonia included: Fol Jazik, arguably the first punk band in Skopje, formed in 1978; Afektiven naboj from Struga formed in 1979 feat. Goran Trajkoski; Other notable acts from Skopje included Badmingtons and Saraceni, both led by Vladimir Petrovski Karter. In Sarajevo, SR Bosnia and Herzegovina, the following artists emerged: Ozbiljno Pitanje (which later evolved into the pop-rock star band Crvena Jabuka), Ševa (which later evolved into Bombaj Štampa led by the charismatic Branko Đurić), and the cult band Zabranjeno Pušenje. These Sarajevian bands later formed the punk-inspired New Primitives movement, an important phenomenon in the former Yugoslav culture.

In the late 1970s, some punk bands were affiliated with the new wave music scene, and were labeled as both punk rock and new wave. During a certain period, the term "new wave music" was interchangeable with "punk".

The end of the 1970s and the beginning of the 1980s saw the emergence of various subgenres of punk rock, such as street punk and Oi!. Later came hardcore punk, followed by various extreme styles such as crust punk, crossover thrash all the way to grindcore. Notable hardcore punk acts during the 1980s included: Niet, Patareni, KBO! and others. A notable mainstream pop punk band was Psihomodo Pop from Croatia (heavily influenced by The Ramones). Many eminent foreign punk bands played concerts around former Yugoslavia including: The Ruts, Siouxsie and the Banshees, U.K. Subs, Angelic Upstarts, The Exploited and The Anti-Nowhere League. In 1983 The Anti-Nowhere League released their album Live in Yugoslavia, while Angelic Upstarts released a live album with the same title in 1985. Beside musicians, the Yugoslav punk subculture also included punk writers and artists, with Ivan Glišić from Šabac being one of the notable ones.

==== New wave music ====
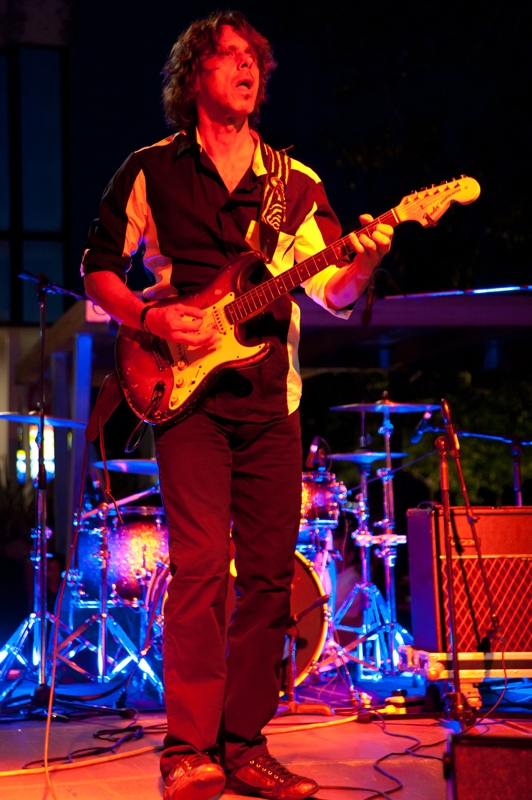
Jurica Pađen, the guitarist of Azra, one of the most popular groups across Yugoslavia

The new wave music scene emerged in the late 1970s and had a significant impact on Yugoslav culture. As its counterparts – the British and the US new wave music scenes, from which the main influences came from, the Yugoslav new wave scene was also closely related to Punk rock, Ska, Reggae, 2 Tone, Power pop, Mod Revival etc. The new wave was especially advocated by the music magazines Polet from Zagreb and Džuboks from Belgrade, and by the TV show Rokenroler, which was known for its artistic music videos.

Important bands of the Yugoslav new wave are: Prljavo kazalište, Novi fosili, Šarlo Akrobata, Idoli, Azra, Električni orgazam, Haustor, Film, Laboratorija Zvuka, Lačni Franz, Cilindar, Gjurmet and many others. This period in the former Yugoslav music is considered a "Golden age". All of these artists still have status of cult bands.

Symbols of the Yugoslav new wave era are the compilation albums Paket aranžman, Novi Punk Val, Artistička Radna Akcija and especially movies Davitelj protiv davitelja (starring Idoli member Srđan Šaper) and Dečko koji obećava (starring Aleksandar Berček and featuring appearances by members of Šarlo Akrobata and Idoli).

An important rockumentary covering this period is Sretno dijete.

=== 1980s ===
As the new wave perished in the beginning of the 1980s, some of the bands split or took different musical directions. The period around 1982 is considered especially crucial concerning the decline of the new wave in Yugoslavia, but also around the world. Many new important bands formed in 1982 after the new wave faded: Dušan Kojić-Koja, the former bass player of Šarlo Akrobata formed the legendary group Disciplina Kičme (a unique noisy mix of punk rock, funk, jazz fusion and many other styles). The band later rose to international prominence and appeared on MTV. Zoran Kostić-Cane, the former vocalist of Radnička Kontrola, formed the furious garage punk group Partibrejkers and achieved huge success. Idoli, Prljavo Kazalište and Film (the latter under the moniker Jura Stublić i Film) became pop-rock and all of them respectively achieved great mainstream success; The cult band Azra gradually moved on to a more conventional rock sound with occasional use of folk rock. Johnny Štulić's poetic trademarks were still notable throughout their lyrics. Električni Orgazam went through a psychedelic phase and later became a successful mainstream rock band inspired mostly by the 1960s sound.

One of the most prominent mainstream dance pop acts during the decade, especially in the early 1980s, was Oliver Mandić. He used transvestite elements in his stage and video performances long before Boy George emerged. His music utilized much funk dance music. The national Radio-Television Belgrade filmed the TV show featuring a collection of his music videos called Beograd noću (Belgrade by Night) directed by Stanko Crnobrnja. The ambitiously avantgarde program won Rose d'Or award at the 1981 Montreux TV festival. Mandić's controversial image in the show, created by the conceptual artist Kosta Bunuševac, raised quite a public furor due to the singer's cross-dressing and aggressive makeup.

A former Riblja čorba member, Momčilo Bajagić Bajaga formed one of the most popular ex-Yugoslav acts ever, Bajaga i Instruktori. Later, Dejan Cukić, one of the members of Instruktori left the band and started a successful solo career.

Family-friendly pop acts during the 1980s were Novi Fosili and the Split based group Magazin, both featuring female vocalists.

1983 was marked by Danijel Popović, the Yugoslav performer at the Eurovision Song Contest in Munich. He instantly became a nationwide pop star, but was also acclaimed around Europe. West German and Swedish artists released cover versions of his hit "Džuli".

In the following year, at the national ESC pre-selection in Skopje, Dado Topić performed a duet with Slađana Milošević, known for her extravagant style comparable to that of Nina Hagen. Although their song "Princeza" did not win, it remained an evergreen pop ballad. Another notable duet was the song "Jabuke i vino" by Željko Bebek and Zana Nimani.

Zana Nimani was a notable artist from the Albanian minority, she was a frontress of the band Zana from Belgrade and later started a solo career.

The most popular TV show during the decade was Hit meseca (Hit of the Month) which was a sort of Yugoslav Top of the Pops. The host of the show was Dubravka "Duca" Marković. A popular magazine among the youths was ITD, which also had a version called Super ITD in a bigger format. The most prominent rock music magazines were Rock and Džuboks.

Musical genres such as Post-punk, Gothic rock, Darkwave, New Romantic and Synthpop were already expanded in SFR Yugoslavia during the early 1980s, and especially at the end of 1980s because of coming of new technologies such as Video recorders and Satellite Television in many homes in SFR Yugoslavia.

==== Post-punk ====
The former punks Pekinška Patka moved to post-punk and darkwave on their second, less acclaimed album Strah od monotonije released in 1981 and soon disbanded. Another legendary band, Paraf, moved from their initial punk rock phase and released their psychedelic album Izleti in 1982 with elements of post-punk and gothic rock. Električni Orgazam had a notable psychedelic phase, during which, they released their album Lišće prekriva Lisabon in 1982.

Milan Mladenović, formerly a guitarist of Šarlo Akrobata, in that same 1982 formed the cult band Ekatarina Velika, initially named Katarina II. The band is remembered for its darker poetic post-punk sound and its intellectual attitude. Some of its members included the bass guitar player Bojan Pečar, formerly a member of Via Talas and the drummer Srđan Todorović, who later rose to internationally acclaimed film actor. Margita Stefanović-Magi, the keyboard player, and Milan, the frontman both rose to a status of "alternative celebrities".

==== Art rock ====
Notable art rock groups included the arty and extravagant Dorian Gray and Boa, both from Zagreb. The former, named after Oscar Wilde's Dorian Gray, formed in 1982, influenced by Roxy Music and Japan. It was led by Massimo Savić, later a successful pop singer. Boa formed in the 1970s, influenced by Yes, King Crimson and Genesis, but later turned to New Romantic. In 1990, it performed as David Bowie's opening act at Stadion Maksimir.

==== New Romantic ====
During the New Romantic era popularized around the world by Duran Duran and Spandau Ballet, prominent acts in Yugoslavia were the aforementioned Zagreb based group Boa and Jakarta from Belgrade.

==== Synthpop ====
Notable synthpop artists in the former Yugoslavia included: Beograd, formed in 1981, named after their hometown Belgrade; Videosex from Ljubljana, Slovenia, led by their charismatic frontress Anja Rupel; the duo Denis & Denis from Croatia featuring the sex-symbol Marina Perazić, who later started a solo career, and her boyfriend Davor Tolja; the humorous bunch Laki Pingvini and a similar act named D' Boys (pronounced as "The Boys") led by Peđa D' Boy, formerly a vocalist of the West German rock band Jane. In Macedonia, a notable synthesizer-led act was the group Bastion which featured the now internationally acclaimed electronic musician Kiril Džajkovski on electronic keyboards and Milcho Manchevski as a lyrics writer. Many Yugoslav artists in this period were already experimenting with the use of personal computers in creating of their music. The cover of the single "Neka ti se dese prave stvari" / "Ne zovi to ljubavlju" by the Belgrade-based group Data featured the then popular Commodore 64.

==== New Primitives ====
The New Primitivism was an urban subcultural movement in Sarajevo in the early 1980s. Some of projects that came from the New Primitives were the band Zabranjeno Pušenje, the Top lista nadrealista TV and radio show, the legendary group Elvis J. Kurtović & His Meteors, Bombaj Štampa and others. Its creators include Elvis J. Kurtović, dr. Nele Karajlić, mr. Sejo Sexon, Bombaj Stampa (featuring actor/director Branko Đurić — Đuro), Boris Šiber, Zenit Đozić from the Sarajevo neighbourhood of Koševo. The film director Emir Kusturica was an associate and friend of the crew.

The fresh spirit that the group left in the urban Bosnian culture and a quite new way of expression, flooding directly from street subculture, attracted significant popularity and made it one of monuments of modern Bosnian culture.

The discourse of New Primitivism was primarily humorous, based on the spirit of Bosnian ordinary people from the cultural underground. They introduced the jargon, rich in Turcisms, of Sarajevo "mahalas" (suburban neighborhoods) into the official musical and TV scene. Most of their songs and sketches involve stories about small people – coalmine workers, petty criminals, provincial girls etc. - put in unusual or even absurd situations. There are comparisons between Monty Python's Flying Circus show and New Primitives methods, as they share the form of short sketches and utilize absurdity as means to illicit laughs from the audience.

The name of the movement arguably came as a reaction to two then-actual movements: New Romantic in global pop music and Slovenian Neue Slowenische Kunst (NSK).

==== Band Aid ====
In the late 1984 Bob Geldof and Midge Ure organized the famine relief campaign named Band Aid, which continued throughout 1985 until its finale – the historical Live Aid concert on 13 July 1985. The concert was broadcast worldwide including SFR Yugoslavia. Beside "Do They Know it's Christmas?" and USA for Africa projects from the UK and USA respectively, plenty of other countries also joined in. For example: Canada, West Germany, Austria, Norway etc. The SFR Yugoslav pop and rock elite also joined Geldof's campaign and formed a Yugoslav Band Aid under the name YU Rock Misija. The group included Oliver Mandić, Željko Bebek, Marina Perazić, Momčilo Bajagić, Aki Rahimovski, Husein Hasanefendić, Slađana Milošević, Jura Stublić, Dado Topić, Massimo Savić, Zdravko Čolić, Izolda Barudžija, Snežana Mišković, Alen Islamović, Sead Lipovača, Dejan Cukić, Doris Dragović, Anja Rupel, Srđan Šaper, Vladimir Divljan, Peđa D' Boy, Zoran Predin and other eminent musicians. They recorded the Yugoslav Band Aid song "Za million godina" ("For a Million Years") written by former Generacija 5 leader Dragan Ilić and Mladen Popović. The guitar solo in the song is played by Vlatko Stefanovski. The song was released as a single. Also a corresponding video was filmed. Bora Đorđević and Goran Bregović, leaders of Riblja Čorba and Bijelo Dugme were not credited on the record's back cover, however they appeared in a TV performance of the song. At the end of the campaign, the Yugoslav musicians played a big 8 hour stadium concert on June 15, 1985, in Belgrade. The video for "Za million godina" was played on many TV stations worldwide and also, on July 13 at the Wembley Stadium on large video screens during a video interlude. It is included, though not completely, in the Overseas contributors section in the official Live Aid DVD that was released in the 2004 by Warner Music Group.

- The Yugoslav message to Live Aid and YU Rock Misija video incl. subtitles

==== Sarajevo school of pop rock ====
Sarajevo developed a distinguishable pop and rock sound, often (but not necessarily) featuring Bosnian folk music elements, which became popular across the whole Yugoslav federation. It was the birthplace of one of the top Yugoslav rock bands Bijelo Dugme and the pop star Zdravko Čolić.

The scene began to develop in the 1960s with groups such as Indexi, Pro Arte and singer/songwriter Kemal Monteno. It continued into the 1970s with Ambasadori, Bijelo dugme and Vatreni poljubac, while the 1980s brought artists such as Plavi Orkestar, Crvena Jabuka, Hari Mata Hari, Dino Merlin, Valentino, Regina, Bolero and Gino Banana.

Sarajevo was also the home of the authentic punk-influenced subculture known as the New Primitives, which developed in the early 1980s and was brought into the mainstream by artists such as Zabranjeno Pušenje, Elvis J. Kurtović & His Meteors, Bombaj Štampa and the radio and TV comedy show Top lista nadrealista.

==== Industrial ====
Notable industrial music acts in Yugoslavia were Autopsia from Ruma and SCH from Sarajevo.

==== Neo-rockabilly ====
The Yugoslav scene also included numerous neo-rockabilly, psychobilly and retro-rock and roll acts.

A noted artist was controversial Velibor "Bora" Miljković, better known as Toni Montano, nicknamed after Tony Montana, the main character of the movie Scarface. He was a former vocalist of the punk rock group Radost Evrope, ironically named after the international children's music festival Joy of Europe held annually in Belgrade. Toni often stirred controversy in his interviews and frequently attacked other musicians, like Ekaterina Velika and such, whom he considered pseudointellectuals who alienated themselves from the "street", where, according to him, the real rock music should emerge from. He arrogantly proclaimed himself a "real rock star" whose time is yet to come. However, he never really managed to achieve the success of his adversaries, who never bothered much with him anyway. His albums often included cover versions of punk rock tracks, such as the Sex Pistols' "Friggin' in the Riggin'" and "Lonely Boy". Espousing an old school macho rocker attitude and image, Toni's songs often featured sexist lyrics.

On the other hand, the group Đavoli from Split led by Nenad "Neno" Belan were a softer retro-rock 'n' roll act, they released several summer hits and also twist or surf music influenced tracks. Some of its members also had punk rock background.

The rockabilly group Fantomi was another act in Croatia, while in Serbia the group called Vampiri emerged with their trademark doo-wop style of singing and performed as a support act of the internationally acclaimed retro jazzy pop group Vaya Con Dios at their concert in Belgrade.

==== Neue Slowenische Kunst ====
In Slovenia, the cult avant-garde band Laibach emerged in 1980. Experimenting with various styles such as industrial, martial and neo-classical music they rose to international prominence and influenced acts such as the group Rammstein for instance. They appeared on MTV with their cover version of "Across the Universe" by The Beatles, featuring a guest-appearance by Anja Rupel. One of the groups connected with NSK were Abbildungen Variete from Maribor.

The most notable electronic body music act was Borghesia, from Ljubljana, Slovenia.

==== Macedonian darkwave and gothic scene ====
While Slovenia had the Neue Slowenische Kunst movement, in Macedonia, the collective Makedonska Streljba was formed. The Macedonian darkwave and gothic rock scene featured some of the most prominent Macedonian acts ever, such as Mizar, Arhangel and Padot na Vizantija, the latter featuring Goran Trajkoski.

==== Extreme metal ====
The extreme metal music scene across SFR Yugoslavia was also developed. It included various thrash metal, speed metal and death metal acts. A festival called Hard Metal was taking place in Belgrade and also a magazine with the same name was published.

Notable acts included speed metal band Bombarder (initially formed in Sarajevo, later moved to Belgrade), Bloodbath (not to be confused with the Swedish band Bloodbath), Heller (the pioneers of Yugoslav thrash metal) and others. The thrash metal band Sanatorium was formed in Skopje in 1987. During its 20 years of existence, it shared stage with many prominent international stars such as Motörhead, Halford, Soulfly and others.

==== Rap music ====
Many rap music artists emerged in SFR Yugoslavia throughout the 1980s. Breakdance groups also existed especially in the first half of the 1980s. A prominent breakdance rap act was The Master Scratch Band. They have released some works for Jugoton in 1984 including the track Break War featuring Hit Meseca host Dubravka "Duca" Marković. Disciplina Kičme also used rap music elements, though in their own specific way, always mixed with numerous other styles.

But there was an artist who utilized rap music in a very distinguishable manner. In the late 1980s, a musician of Montenegrin origin came into nationwide prominence: Rambo Amadeus. His pseudonym as well as his music encompassed an intellectual attitude on one side, but also a distinguishable Balkan-flavoured humour and macho camp on the other. He often, if not always used rap music combined with folk music parody and political-social satire, although he doesn't fit into the conventional rap music category because he went beyond the style. He also coined the term "turbo folk", though he was one of its greatest enemies. He is still a cult personality in the ex-Yugoslav territories.

He often closely cooperated with another musician, Dino Dvornik, the son of the Croatian actor Boris Dvornik. Dino Dvornik was a popular funk-inspired dance-pop artist.

=== Yugoslav Wars and aftermath (1990s) ===
Two years after the group Riva won the Eurovision Song Contest 1989 and one year after the Eurovision Song Contest 1990 took place in Zagreb, the SFR Yugoslav music scene ceased to exist with the breakup of Yugoslavia. Ironically, the 1990 winning song performed by Toto Cutugno was called Insieme: 1992 (in Italian: Together in 1992) featuring the lyrics Together, Unite, Unite Europe! acclaiming the approaching European unification that took place in 1992.

Tajči became one of the last breakout pop stars in Yugoslavia, before the disintegration of the country cut her career short and she emigrated to the United States.

With the outbreak of the Yugoslav Wars many of the former Yugoslav musicians participated in anti-war activities, often being attacked by the nationalists in their countries. In 1992, the Serbian rock supergroup Rimtutituki featuring members of Partibrejkers, Ekatarina Velika and Električni Orgazam released an anti-militarist song, and after the authorities forbade them to promote it with a live show, they performed on a trailer towed by a truck through the streets of Belgrade. However, others previously involved in the Yugoslav pop and rock scene embraced national chauvinism, and even saw active combat.

A notable example is the song "E, moj druže Beogradski" ("Hey my Belgrade comrade"). Although generally seen as an emotional anti-war song pointed against the Serbian nationalism written by Jura Stublić from the Croatian group Film, at the time of its appearance it caused different reactions. Bora Đorđević, who had a cult status in the Serbian rock scene as a frontman of Riblja Čorba, soon "replied" with the controversial song "E moj druže Zagrebački" ("Hey my Zagreb comrade"), a cynical parody featuring nationalist messages.

Many Croatian pop and rock artists took part in projects such as "Moja domovina" and Rock za Hrvatsku during the Croatian War of Independence.

When the Bosnian War broke out, the Sarajevo based group Zabranjeno Pušenje split into two separate fractions. The latter based itself in Belgrade and received international exposure under the name No Smoking Orchestra led by Nele Karajlić, also featuring the movie director Emir Kusturica. They played with Joe Strummer and that concert footage is included in the Super 8 Stories film directed by Kusturica. Newly established folk singer Zehra Bajraktarević's career was met with the harshness of siege of Sarajevo, nonetheless she continued to produce albums despite the conditions of the war.

While Slovenia, Croatia, Bosnia and Herzegovina and Macedonia proclaimed themselves independent states, the leaderships of Serbia and Montenegro decided to form a new federal state called the Federal Republic of Yugoslavia which existed from 1992 until 2003, however it was not recognized as a legal successor to the former Socialist Federal Republic of Yugoslavia.

The local scenes in the independent countries that emerged after the breakup of Yugoslavia continued to exist, some of them heavily suffering during the war. The music scene continued even in the shelters during the Sarajevo siege and a compilation album Rock under siege (Radio Zid Sarajevo, Stichting Popmuziek Nederland) was released in 1995.

The music of the Yugoslav Wars has gained a cult following on the internet, mostly among foreigners. This is evidenced by the wide popularity of the YouTube channels Kocayine and Наша Српска Архива (Our Serbian Archive). Some notable artists in this style of music are Lepi Mića and Baja Mali Knindža.

=== 2000s ===
After the end of the conflicts and especially later, after the departure of leaders such as Slobodan Milošević and Franjo Tuđman, the former Yugoslav nations started to normalise their relations. Thus their music scenes could freely restore their former cooperation. Many of the former pop and rock stars re-emerged and toured the former Yugoslav countries: Bijelo Dugme, Leb i Sol, Crvena Jabuka, Plavi Orkestar, Massimo Savić (formerly of Dorian Gray) and Boris Novković (formerly of the group Boris i Noćna Straža), while Anja Rupel, formerly of Videosex, recorded a duet with Toše Proeski, a young Macedonian pop singer who became respected in all the former Yugoslav countries.

Following the reconciliation of Serbia and Croatia, the aforementioned Croatian musician Jura Stublić held three sold-out concerts in Belgrade in 2003. Asked by the media about "E, moj druže Zagrebački" case, Bora Đorđević replied that "it was just a joke". He also expressed approbation for Stublić's comeback to Belgrade after so many years. On the other hand, Bajaga and Đorđe Balašević had respectively made numerous concert appearances in Croatia and Bosnia.

In 2003 Igor Mirković from Croatia made the rockumentary Sretno dijete (Happy Child) named after a song by Prljavo Kazalište. The movie covers the early Yugoslav punk rock and new wave scenes featuring eminent artists from Zagreb, Ljubljana and Belgrade.

== Music for children ==
Many eminent former Yugoslav Pop and Rock artists composed children's music, mostly educational. The SFR Yugoslav system through its media encouraged children to practise the traditional folk music and dances, as well as to listen to pop and rock music, contrary to the kitschy "novokomponovana narodna muzika".

- In Serbia, Vranešević brothers from Laboratorija Zvuka were especially active in composing music for children TV programs, mostly for Radio-televizija Beograd and Radio-televizija Novi Sad. Their music was featured in the popular shows: Poletarac; Priče iz Nepričave starring Zoran Radmilović and Milena Dravić, and Čik pogodi ko sam in which, one of the episodes featured Zoran Simjanović who invited the kids to a recording studio.
- The Macedonian children show Bušava azbuka (Бушава Азбука) created for Macedonian Radio-Televizija Skopje (now Macedonian Radio-Television) by Goran Stefanovski and Slobodan Unkovski featured music by Leb i Sol and Ana Kostovska, the frontress of Bastion.
- The popular children TV show Fore i fazoni created for Radio-televizija Beograd by Ljubivoje Ršumović featured performances by Laboratorija zvuka, the Croatian pop star Oliver Dragojević, the Bosnian singer Seid Memić- Vajta and the Belgrade-based group Poslednja Igra Leptira.
- Branko Kockica gained nationwide popularity as a children show host of Kocka, kocka, kockica (Radio-televizija Beograd). He often used rock music in his show. Once he appeared in a stereotypical rock outfit playing Riblja Čorba's "Rokenrol za kućni savet", a song about irritating the neighbours with loud rock music. He also released various children music albums like 1988's Deca bez adrese with Oliver Mandić.
- Arsen Dedić the prominent Croatian chanson artist released an album Arsen pjeva djeci (Arsen sings to the children).
- Vlado Kalember from Srebrna Krila released a children song for peace "Nek živi ljubav".
- Srđan Gojković - Gile from Električni Orgazam together with Vlada Divljan from Idoli released two educational children albums: Rokenrol za decu and Rokenrol bukvar under the label of PGP RTS.

== Record labels ==
- Jugoton
- PGP-RTB
- Suzy
- ZKP RTLJ
- Diskoton
- Jugodisk

== Related films and TV shows ==
- The Girl in the Park
- The Naughty Ones
- Sretno dijete
- The Promising Boy
- Rockuments
- Rockovnik
- Strangler vs. Strangler
- The Fall of Rock and Roll
- When I Am Dead and Gone

== See also ==
- New wave music in Yugoslavia
- Punk rock in Yugoslavia
- YU Rock Misija
- Neue Slowenische Kunst
- New Primitives
- Sarajevo school of pop rock
- YU 100: najbolji albumi jugoslovenske rok i pop muzike
- Yugoton
- Slovenian rock
- Bosnian rock
- Serbian rock
- Croatian popular music
- Music of Slovenia
- Music of Croatia
- Music of Bosnia and Herzegovina
- Music of Serbia
- Music of Montenegro
- Music of the Republic of Macedonia
- Music of Yugoslavia
- Yugonostalgia
- Rokeri s Moravu
