= Aboa =

Aboa may refer to:

- Turku (Latin: Aboa)
- Aboa (research station)
- Aboa Vetus & Ars Nova
