= Boško Buha Theatre =

Theater in Belgrade, Serbia

Pozorište Boško Buha
- Boško Buha Theatre
- Official logo

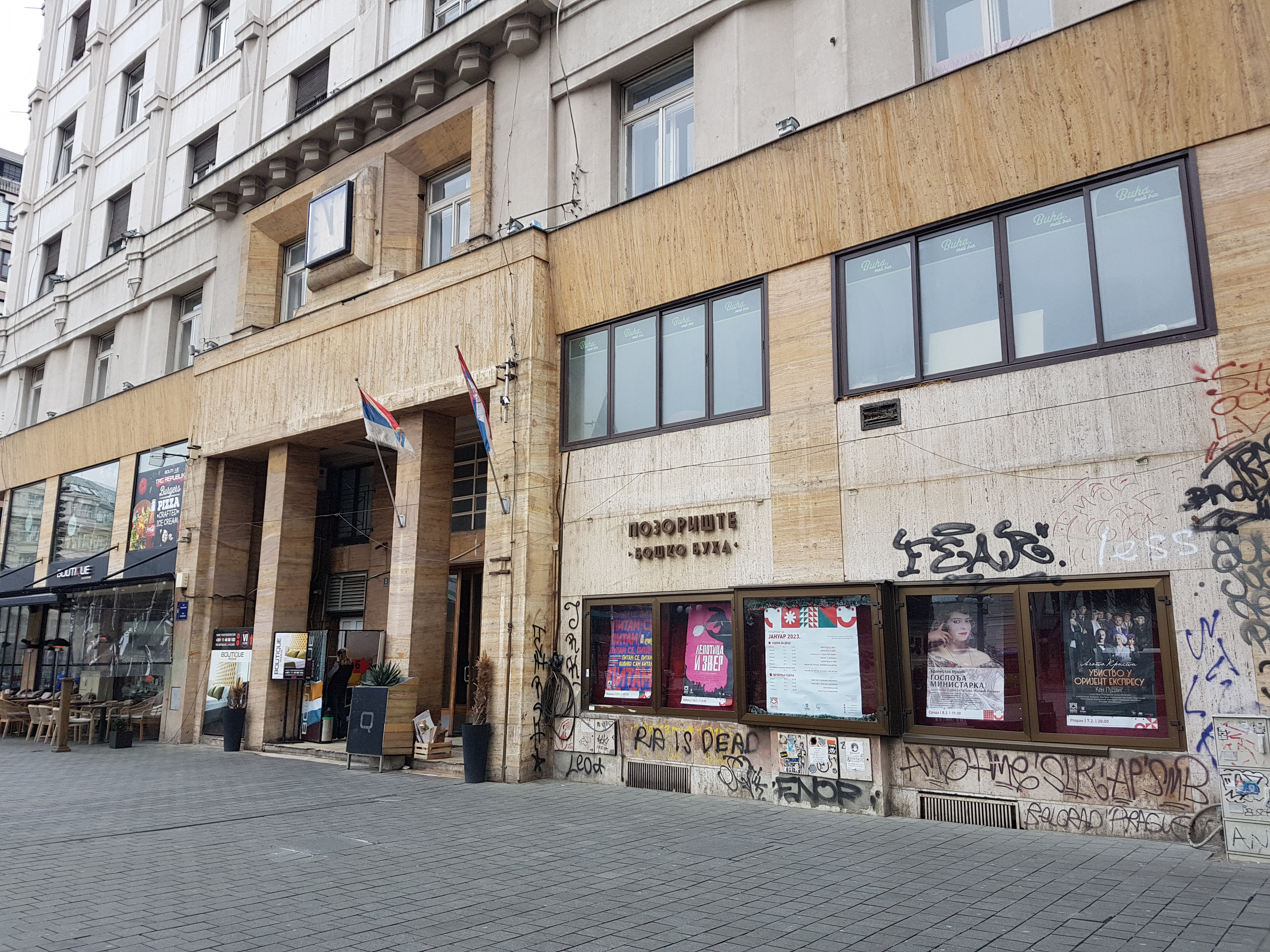

- Location within Belgrade
- Address: Trg Republike 3 Belgrade; Serbia
- Coordinates: 44.8161°N 20.4594°E
- Owner: City of Belgrade

Construction
- Opened: 1950; 76 years ago
- Years active: 1950–present

Website
- www.buha.rs

Boško Buha Theatre is a theater in Belgrade, the capital of Serbia.

== History ==
It was founded in 1950 by Gita Predić-Nušić and Đurđinka Marković, as first Serbian professional theater for the children. It was named after Boško Buha, who was a young Partisan who used to be one of the greatest icons of World War II in the former Yugoslavia.

As of 2010, despite being one of twenty largest theaters in Belgrade, it is among the least popular.
