= Dorian Gray (band) =

- Origin: Zagreb, SR Croatia, SFR Yugoslavia
- Genre: Art rock
- Years active: 1982–1986
- Label: Jugoton

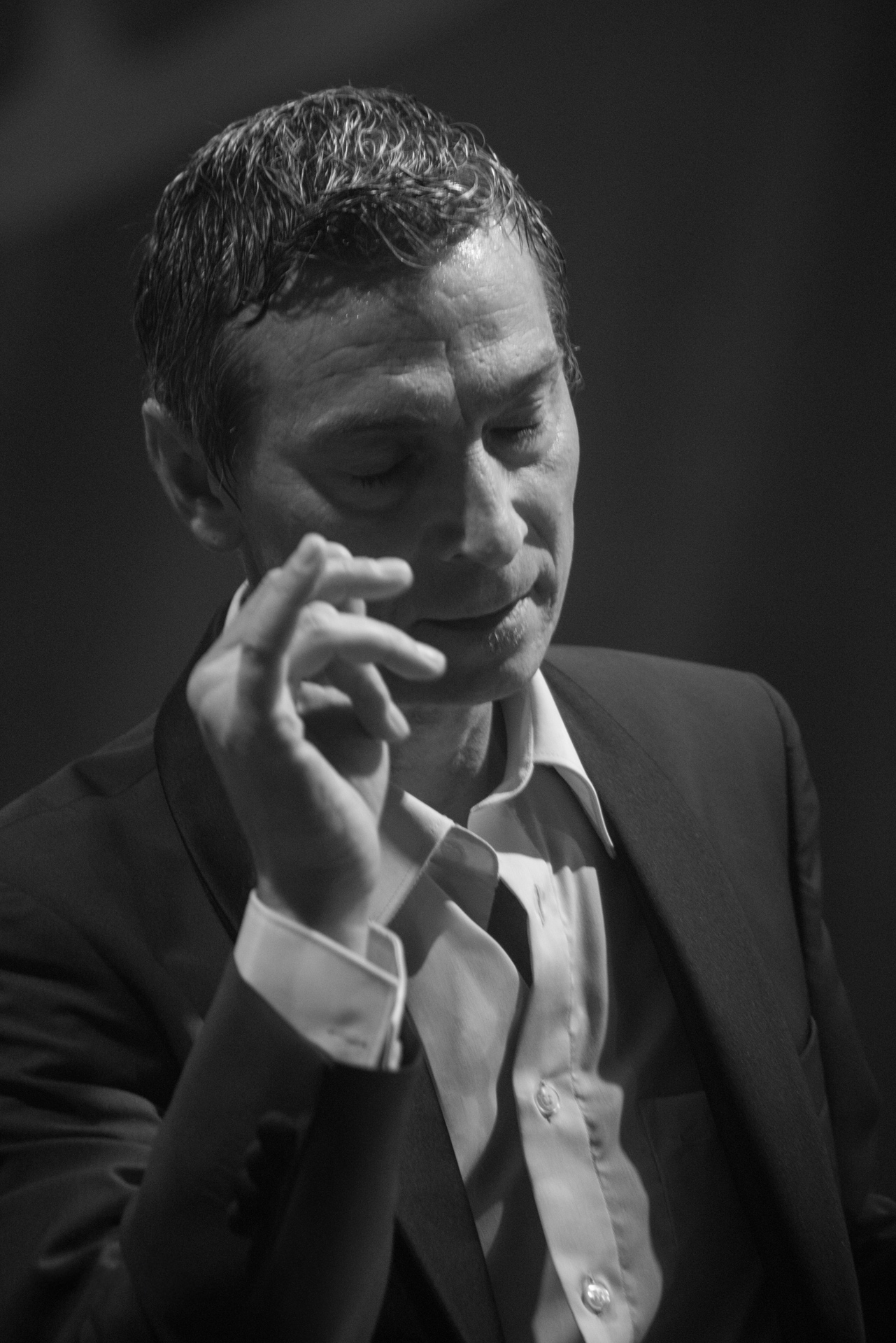
Massimo Savić, shown here in 2013, was the lead singer of Dorian Gray throughout its 1980s run.

Dorian Gray was a 1980s Yugoslav music group which achieved great prominence in the former Yugoslav rock scene for its artistic and extravagant style and stage performances. It was led by Massimo Savić, who later started a successful solo career. It should not be confused with the short-lived 1970s German band of the same name.

== Biography ==
The band was formed in 1982 in Zagreb, then SR Croatia, SFR Yugoslavia consisting of the frontman Massimo Savić (vocals, guitar), Vedran Čupić (guitar), Emil Krnjić (bass guitar), Toni Ostojić (keyboards), and Branko Terzić (drums), who suggested the name Dorian Gray after the Oscar Wilde's fictional character Dorian Gray. Since the group was into art rock, influenced by artists such as David Sylvian's Japan, Bryan Ferry's Roxy Music and some David Bowie's works, the other members found the suggested name appropriate and gladly accepted it.

Their early rehearsals and gigs were taking place in the art gallery of the Zagreb's Student Centre. After performing in Croatia and the then-SR Slovenia the group soon got critically acclaimed across the whole former Yugoslav federation and took part in the notable music festival YURM (Yugoslav Rock Moment).

In the late-1983 Dorian Gray recorded its debut album Sjaj u tami ("Glow in the Darkness") produced by Saša Habić, who played the electric piano in the recording sessions, which also featured guest appearances by the bassist Jadran Zdunjić and the saxophone player Miroslav Sedak Benčić. The album, which was a major success was also noted for its artistic record sleeve which was designed by Sanja Baharah and Mario Krištofić. Notable hit single was "Sjaj u tami", a cover version of the famous song "The Sun Ain't Gonna Shine (Anymore)". After the release of the album, the line up was changed since Terzić, Čupić and Krnjić decided to leave the group. New members became: Zdunjić, the drummer Dragan Simonovski and the guitarist Zoran Cvetković Zok, a former member of the eminent Croatian and Yugoslav Rock acts Prljavo kazalište and Parni valjak. The second album Za tvoje oči ("For Your Eyes Only") which was recorded in Sweden and produced by Sjunne Ferger, was released in 1985.

After Dorian Gray disbanded in 1986 due to overspending the production budget for their second album and pressures from Jugoton, Massimo Savić started a successful solo career as a pop music singer.

== Discography ==
- Sjaj u tami (Jugoton, 1983)
- Za tvoje oči (Jugoton, 1985)
- Dorian Gray (Croatia Records, 1997)
