= Massimo Savić =

Croatian pop singer (1962–2022)

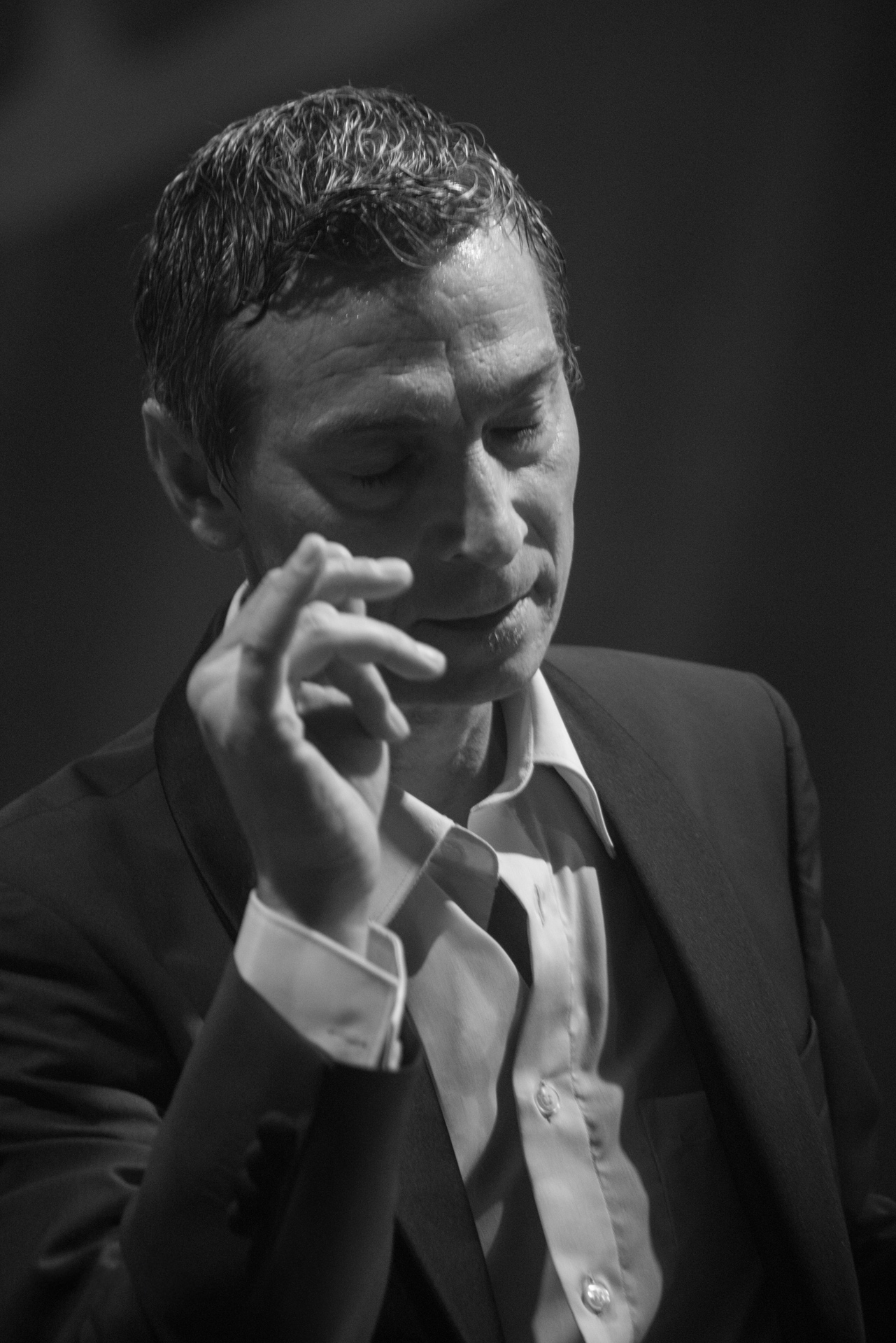
- Massimo in 2013
- Born: Massimo Moreno Savić; 6 June 1962; Pula, PR Croatia, FPR Yugoslavia
- Died: 23 December 2022 (aged 60); Zagreb, Croatia
- Burial place: Zadar City Cemetery
- Occupation: Singer
- Spouse: Eni Kondić (m. 1992)
- Children: 1
- Parents: Sergio Savić (father); Elda Klapčić (mother)
- Musical career
- Genres: Pop
- Instruments: Vocals; guitar
- Years active: 1982–2022
- Label: Aquarius Records
- Formerly of: Dorian Gray

Massimo Moreno Savić (6 June 1962 – 23 December 2022), also known simply as Massimo, was a Croatian pop singer.

== Biography ==
Savić was born in Pula. His father Sergio was from Banjevci, Municipality of Stankovci, near Lake Vrana. His mother Elda (née Klapčić) was an Italian from Nedešćina.

He first became popular in the 1980s with his band Dorian Gray, and then soon embarked on a successful solo career. He won eleven Porin awards for best male vocal performance, 2004–2007, 2011-2016 and 2023.

In 2013, Massimo's thirty-year anniversary concert sold out the Pula Arena. It featured Vlado Kreslin, Neno Belan, and Nina Badrić as guests, and was also broadcast live by the Croatian Radiotelevision. He was one of the judges on the second series of X Factor Adria.

Massimo died from lung cancer at Sisters of Charity Hospital in Zagreb on 23 December 2022, at the age of 60. He was buried at the Zadar City Cemetery on 3 January 2023.

== Discography ==
=== Albums ===
- with Dorian Gray – Sjaj u tami, Jugoton, 1983
- with Dorian Gray – Za tvoje oči, Jugoton, 1985
- Stranac u noći, Jugoton, 1987
- Riječi čarobne, Jugoton, 1988
- Muzika za tebe, Jugoton, 1989
- Zemlja plesa, Jugoton, 1990
- Elements, Helidon, 1992
- with Labin Art Express – Metal Guru - Body, Energy & Emotions, 1993
- Benzina, Croatia Records/Tutico, 1995
- with Labin Art Express – Metal Guru - Hero in 21st Century, 1998
- Massimo, Aquarius Records/Multimedia Records, 2003
- Vještina, Aquarius/Multimedia Records, 2004
- Massimo - Zlatna kolekcija, Croatia Records, 2004
- Apsolutno Uživo - live Iz Kluba Aquarius, Aquarius, 2005
- Vještina 2, Aquarius, 2006
- Sunce se ponovo rađa, Aquarius, 2008
- Massimo Sings Sinatra, Aquarius, 2010
- Dodirni me slučajno, Aquarius, 2011
- 1 dan ljubavi, Aquarius, 2015
- Sada (2018)

=== Singles ===
Title	Year	Peak chart positions	Album
Title	Year	CRO Airplay	Album
"Gdje smo sad"	2013	1	Dodirni me slučajno
"Učini sve za nju" (with Ivana Husar)	2013	2	Učini sve za nju
"Suze nam stale na put"	2013	1	1 dan ljubavi
"Ispod nekog drugog neba"	2015	1	1 dan ljubavi
"1 dan ljubavi"	2015	1	1 dan ljubavi
"Kladim se na nas"	2015	2	1 dan ljubavi
"Neka ti plove brodovi"	2017	2	Sada
"Nama se nikud ne žuri" (with Vatra)	2018	1	Nama se nikud ne žuri
"Mali krug velikih ljudi"	2020	1	Non-album single
"Putujemo i kad stojimo"	2021	1	Non-album single
"Zamisli"	2022	1	Non-album single
"—" denotes releases that did not chart or were not released in that territory.
