= Boa (Croatian band) =

Croatian pop rock music group

- Origin: Zagreb, Yugoslavia (present-day Croatia)
- Genres: Art rock; pop; rock
- Years active: 1979–present
- Labels: Suzy; Croatia Records; Hit Records; Dancing Bear
- Members: Mladen Puljiz; Slavko Remenarić; Paolo Sfeci; Zvonimir Bučević; Gojko Tomljanović
- Past members: Igor Šoštarić; Damir Košpić

Boa is a Yugoslav and Croatian pop rock music group, which was especially active during the 1980s around the former SFR Yugoslavia.

== History ==
The band's early history started in Zagreb, then SR Croatia in 1974, when its founding members Mladen Puljiz and Slavko Remenarić switched their interest from classical music to rock music, inspired by art rock acts such as Yes, King Crimson, Genesis, David Bowie, Roxy Music and Peter Gabriel.

The group started its concert activity in 1979 with a line-up consisted of Mladen Puljiz (keyboards, vocals), Slavko Remenarić (guitar), Igor Šoštarić (drums) and Damir Košpić (bass guitar). The band moved towards the then-actual New Romantic sound and fashion, and after the release of their debut album for Suzy in 1982, they were voted by the readers of the prominent Yugoslav musical magazine Džuboks as the best upcoming act of the year.

Their next album, Ritam strasti (Rhythm of passion), followed by around a hundred concerts around former Yugoslavia brought them even higher popularity. Despite the fact that their next album, Govor tijela (Body language), included some successful hits, the band fell into a creative crisis, and thus the group halted its activities until 1989, when the group got a new rhythm section consisting of the drummer Paolo Sfeci (former member of Aerodrom and Parni valjak) and the bass player Zvonimir Bučević (prominent session musician).

In 1990 the band released the album Prvi val (First Wave) and performed as a support act of David Bowie's concert at Maksimir stadium in Zagreb in front of over 50,000 people. Two years after, they released the compilation album 81-92 featuring live performances and studio recordings with new arrangements. The CD also included the song Zemlja, which was recorded in 1991 for the Rock za Hrvatsku (Rock for Croatia) music project, a tribute to the Croatian War of Independence. In 1993, a new member of the group was the keyboard player Gojko Tomljanović. In the next year they release the CD Kraj djetinjstva (End of Childhood) featuring guest appearances by prominent artists such as Josipa Lisac, Dino Dvornik and Vanna. The feature song "Kao mir" (Like peace), a duet with Josipa Lisac, was nominated in two categories for the prestigious Croatian music award Porin.

In 2002 Croatia Records released the integral versions of the two first albums on Audio CD, which was awarded with Porin in the Re-release of the year category. Following this success, the band also released a compilation featuring songs from their third and fourth albums in 2004 under the title Kao nekad (Like in the old days). All of the songs were remastered and in some of them the authors modified the arrangements. The CD also contains bonus tracks such as "Boa Constrictor", an experimental instrumental, which includes sound effects that Puljiz and Remenarić recorded back in 1974 on their old Grundig 2-track open-reel tape recorder.

The group is still active.

== Discography ==
- LP Boa (Suzy, 1982)
- LP Ritam strasti (Suzy, 1982)
- LP Govor tijela (Suzy, 1983)
- LP Prvi val (Suzy, 1990)
- CD 81-92 (Orfej/DEA Music, 1992)
- CD Kraj djetinjstva (Orfej 1994)
- CD Boa/Ritam strasti (Suzy/Croatia Records, 2002)
- CD Kao nekad (Suzy/Hit Records, 2004)
- CD Dnevnik putovanja, skice ostanka (Dancing Bear, 2006)
