= Novembar =

Serbian punk rock band

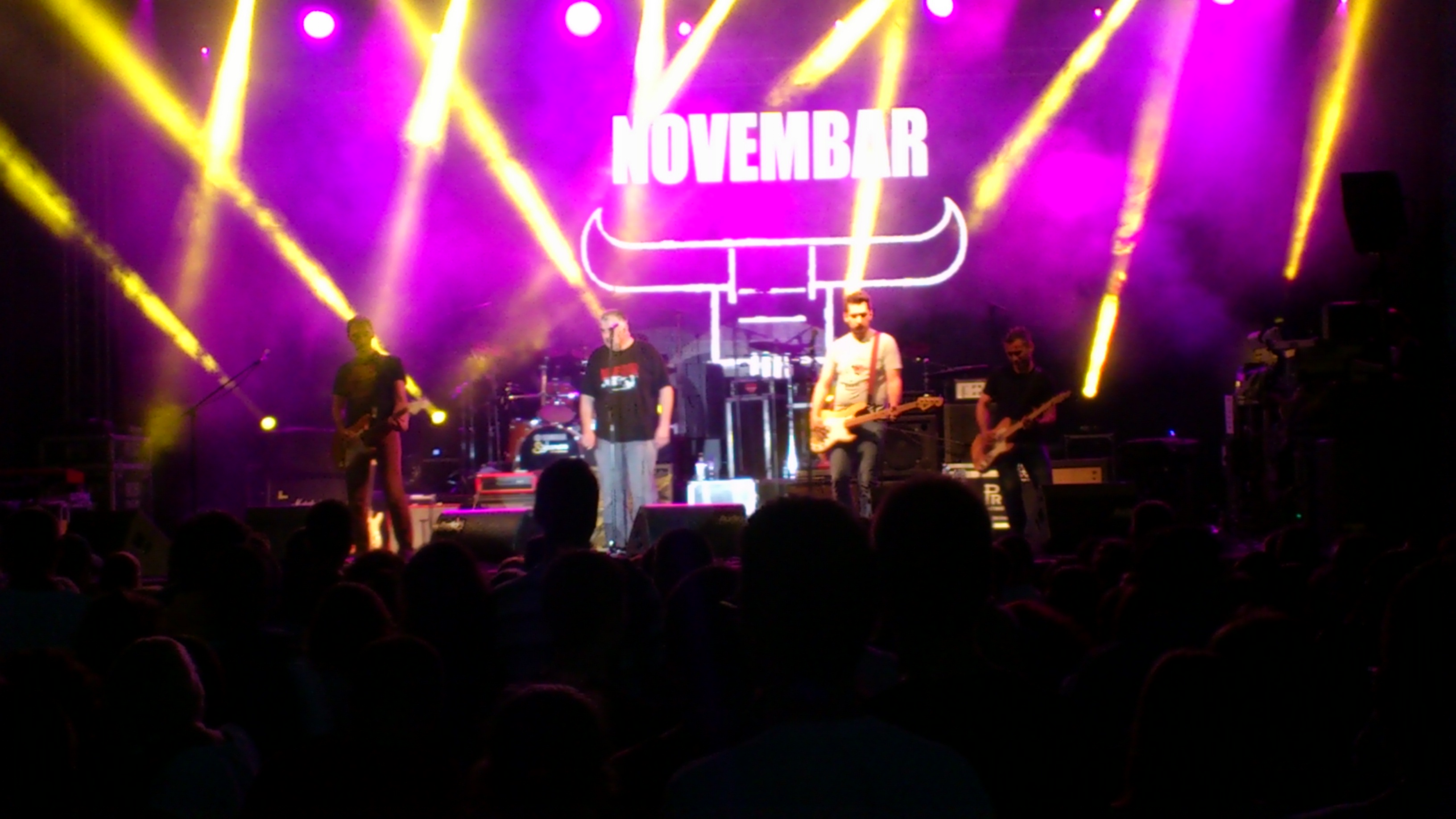
- Novembar performing in Niš in 2016

Background information
- Origin: Niš, Serbia
- Genres: Punk rock; power pop; new wave revival
- Years active: 1991–2019(Reunions: 2021)
- Labels: No Man's Land, B92, SIIC, Basement Blues Records, SKC NS, Hardwired Records
- Past members: Goran Kostić; Aleksandar Đokić; Toni Kostadinov; Goran Savić; Zoran Ranđelović; Zoran Vidaković; Saša Jablanović; Milan Stanimirović; Dragan Stojiljković; Bojan Ranđelović; Milan Vidaković; Nenad Pejčić

Novembar (Serbian Cyrillic: Новембар; transl. November) was a Serbian punk rock band formed in Niš in 1991. Led by vocalist Goran Kostić "Kosta", the band eslablished themselves as one of the most prominent acts of the 1990s and 2000s Serbian punk rock scene. The group released five studio albums prior to Kostić's death in 2017. Their sixth and last studio album was released posthumously in 2019, followed by the band's farewell performance.

== History ==
=== The beginnings: Studeni Studeni and band formation (1986–1991) ===
The band's origins can be tracked back to the band Studeni Studeni (Cold November) from Zagreb (at the time capital of SR Croatia within SFR Yugoslavia). Studeni Studeni, formed in 1986, described by the Yugoslav music press as a promising young act, performed melodic punk rock influenced by American punk rock acts. The band recorded only an EP, Čisto kao suza (Bright as a Teardrop), released in 1990, before disbanding due to the outbreak of the Yugoslav Wars. The band's frontman, guitarist and vocalist Goran Kostić moved to Belgrade, and then, during the summer of 1991 to Niš, where he immediately started playing bass guitar in the band Glas Amerike (Voice of America). A month later, Kostić switched to guitar, and the band changed the name to Novembar, the lineup consisting of Kostić (guitar, vocals), Aleksandar Đokić (guitar), Toni Kostadinov (bass guitar) and Goran Savić (drums), the latter formerly of the Niš bands Fleke (The Spots) and Dead Carrington. The band had their first performances in Niš club Underground.

=== Nationwide breakthrough and popularity (1992–2017) ===
The following year, the band performed at Palilula Culture Olympics festival in Belgrade as the festival's special guests, as Studeni Studeni had won the first place at the festival the previous year. At the time, the band changed the lineup: bassist Zoran Ranđelović, who previously played with a number of Karlovac bands and with Boris Novković's backing band Noćna Straža (Night Watch), replaced Kostadinov, drummer Savić switched to guitar, and the new drummer became Zoran Vidaković. Simultaneously, Kostić started working as a music editor at Radio Niš.

The band released their debut album Deguelo in 1994, to positive reactions of Serbian music critics. The album featured a guest appearance by Ekatarina Velika leader Milan Mladenović, who played the guitar solo in the track "Gledaj kako ljubav umire" ("Watch as Love Is Dying"), a song from the Studeni Studeni period. The album was entirely written by Kostić, except for "Rođendan" ("Birthday") lyrics, written by poet Zvonko Karanović, and "Ja sam je volio" ("I Used to Love Her") lyrics, originally written by Denis Romac, guitarist of the Zagreb rock band Sin Albert (Son Albert). The album was released by the independent record label No Man's Land, founded by the band themselves with Zvonko Karanović and Milan Jelenković.

The band promoted the material with series of concerts across Serbia and the region, including appearances at the Urban Rock festival, held in Skopje, Republic of Macedonia, with the bands from Croatia, Albania, Slovenia and Greece, and the No Man's Land festival in Niš, performing with the Dutch band Blind, Macedonian band Suns, and Serbian bands KBO!, Obojeni Program and Džukele. At the end of June 1996, they performed at punk rock festival Zgaga held at Hotič pri Litji near Ljubljana, Slovenia, with the bands KUD Idijoti, Majke and Goblini.

In early 1997, the band released their second album, Blues južne pruge (Southern Railway Blues), through B92. The album was produced by Kostić, and featured covers of "Baby, baby" by the Niš band Fleke and "Mjesto pod Suncem" ("Place under the Sun") by the Zagreb band Zvijezde. Once again, the band collaborated with Zvonko Karanović, who authored the lyrics for "Posle svega kiša" ("After Everything, Rain").

The band's third album, Licem prema zemlji (Face towards the Ground), released in 2000, was produced by Marinko Vukomanović and featured guest appearances by the Atheist Rap members Vladimir Radusinović "Radule" and Zoran Lekić "Leki" on backing vocals. The album was recorded by a new lineup, featuring Kostić, guitarist Saša Jablanović, rhythm guitarist Bojan Ranđelović, bass guitarist Milan Stanimirović and drummer Dragan Stojiljković. Karanović once again appeared on the album as lyricist, authoring the lyrics for "Jača nego ljubav" ("Stronger than Love"). In 2002, the band participated in the Milan Mladenović tribute album Kao da je bilo nekad... Posvećeno Milanu Mladenoviću (As if It Had Happened Sometime... (Dedicated to Milan Mladenović)) with the cover version of Šarlo Akrobata song "O, O, O...".

In 2005, the band continued their activity after a hiatus, in the lineup consisting of Goran Kostić (bass guitar, vocals), Aleksandar Đokić (guitar), Bojan Ranđelović (guitar), and Milan Vidaković (drums), having their first performance since the reformation at the Nisomnia festival held at the Niš Fortress. In 2006, the band appeared on the Pankrti tribute album Pankrti 06 with the cover version of the song "Kdo so ti ljudje" ("Who Are These People"). The song, with the previously released covers "O, O, O...", "Baby, baby", and "Mjesto pod Suncem", appeared on Novembar cover album Radulizam (Radulism, named after the Atheist Rap member and Kostić's kum Vladimir Radusinović "Radule"), released in 2008. The album also featured cover versions of songs by Petar i Zli Vuci, Termiti, La Strada, Azra, Bezobrazno Zeleno and KBO!. Originally intending to include the cover version of Prljavo Kazalište song "Neka te ništa ne brine" ("May Nothing Make You Worry"), the band did not get the approval to release it from Prljavo Kazalište leader Jasenko Houra, so the track was left out of the release.

In 2007, the band released the compilation Ko je Sunce ubio (Who Killed the Sun), featuring Studeni Studeni demo recordings, material from Studeni Studeni only EP, and the previously unreleased Novembar live and demo recordings. In 2009, Multimedia Records released a live various artists compilation Groovanje devedesete uživo featuring the band's song "Irena", recorded live at the Belgrade club Prostor on 2 September 1994. The band celebrated their 20th anniversary with two concerts in Niš club Feedback, on 19 and 20 January 2012. The concerts featured guest appearances by 14 bands, including Atheist Rap, Grandpa Candys, Grupa Tvog Života, and others. Every band, beside their own songs, performed a song by Novembar during their set.

In March 2013, Novembar released their fifth studio album, entitled Proklet (Damned One). The album was produced by Nenad Pejčić, who also played bass guitar on the album recording. The album featured a guest appearance by Kris Pantelas of the Greek band Voodoo Healers, on the track "Punk Rock Story". During the same year, Kostić's side project Protektori (The Protectors), which he started with Vladimir Radusinović, released the album Kretenov let (Flight of the Jerk).

In February 2015, the members of the band announced that they are working on a new studio album. The band celebrated their 25th anniversary on the festival 5 do 100 (5 to 100), held on 4 July 2016 at Niš Fortress. The festival featured Novembar, the band Van Gogh celebrating their 30th anniversary, and the band Galija, celebrating their 40th anniversary (the combined "age" of the bands was 95, thus the title of the festival). In the autumn of 2016, the band participated in the tribute album to KUD Idijoti entitled Za tebe — A Tribute to KUD Idijoti (For You — A Tribute to KUD Idijoti) with a cover of KUD Idijoti song "Baj, baj, bejbe" (transliteration for "Bye, Bye, Baby"). In March 2017, Novembar released the single "Magla" ("The Fog"), recorded with singer-songwriter Nikola Vranjković, as an announcement of their new studio album.

=== Kostić's death, posthumous album and farewell performance (2017–2019) ===
On 30 June 2017, Goran Kostić died in Niš of heart attack at the age of 51. Two weeks later, the rest of the members held the band's previously announced concert at Rock in Niš festival in honor of Kostić. The band's final studio album, entitled simply Novembar, was released posthumously in 2019. The only album track completed before Kostić's death was "Sve zaboravljam" ("I'm Forgetting Everything"). The rest of the album tracks featured vocals recorded by Pero Lovšin, Sejo Sexon, Nikola Vranjković, Branko Golubović "Golub", and others. On 19 January 2019, the members of Novembar held their farewell concert at Belgrade club Elektropionir, featuring numerous guests. The members of the group reunited on 24 September 2021, to perform at a concert in Niš dedicated to Kostić.

== Legacy ==
Following Kostić's death, a street in Niš municipality Palilula was named after him. In 2017, a newly-initiated festival in Srebrenica was named Novembar Fest in honor of Kostić.

In 2014 a tribute album to Novembar was released, entitled Tako mlad i tako čist (So Young and So Clean) and featuring cover of Novembar songs recorded by Atheist Rap, Zvoncekova Bilježnica, KBO!, and other acts.

In 2021, the band's album Deguelo was polled 16th on the list of 100 Best Serbian Albums Since the Breakup of SFR Yugoslavia. The list was published in the book Kako (ni)je propao rokenrol u Srbiji (How Rock 'n' Roll in Serbia (Didn't) Came to an End).

== Discography ==
=== Studio albums ===
- Deguelo (1994)
- Blues južne pruge (1996)
- Licem prema zemlji (2000)
- Radulizam (2008)
- Proklet (2013)
- Novembar (2019)

=== Compilation albums ===
- Ko je Sunce ubio (2007)

== See also ==
- Punk rock in Yugoslavia
