= Arsenal Fest =

Summer music festival held in Kragujevac, Serbia

Arsenal Fest Арсенал Фест
- Official logo
- Genre: Rock, electronica, electronic dance music, metal, hip hop, punk, drum and bass
- Dates: 3 days, late June
- Locations: Kragujevac, Serbia
- Years active: 2011–present
- Website: www.arsenalfest.rs

Arsenal Fest (Serbian Cyrillic: Арсенал Фест) is a summer music festival held in Kragujevac, Serbia. It is staged annually since 2011 and occurs for three days every late June.

== History ==
When it started in 2011, the festival had only a single stage. The next year, 2012. the festival got its second stage – "Zastavina bašta", later renamed as "Garden Stage". The third one, "Red Bull Stage" was put in use in 2013, but renamed next year as "Explosive DJ Stage".

In 2011, the festival had 14,000 visitors. In 2012, it was visited by 15,000 people. In 2013 and 2014 it was visited by approximately 25,000 people.

The visitors of Arsenal Fest with tickets also have a possibility of having accommodation in the festival camp named "Arsenal Rock Camp" which is situated near the main city stadium “Čika Dača”.

== Location ==
It is held in the historical place where the Serbian industry revolution has started in the mid-19th century by opening a gun factory which later led to opening automotive facility Zastava Automobiles. The festival is famous for offering extraordinary mixture of modern sound and light systems and specific 19th century industrial architecture. The location of Arsenal Fest is a huge advantage of the festival, because it is situated just a few hundred meters from the downtown Kragujevac, but is, at the same time, completely isolated from the tumult of the city that has 175,000 residents.

== Festival by year ==
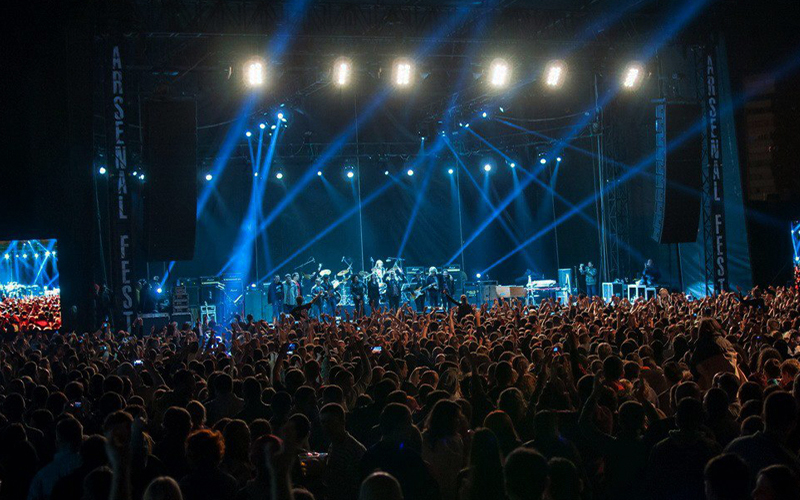
Main Stage, 2016

#	Year	Dates	Attendance	Headliners	Notable acts	Ticket price in RSD
1	2011	16–18 June	14,000		Jinx, S.A.R.S., Čovek Bez Sluha, Orthodox Celts, Hladno Pivo, Del Arno Band, Partibrejkers, Dubioza Kolektiv, The Dibidus, Rambo Amadeus.	1000
2	2012	14–16 June	15,000		Stereo MCs, Therapy?, Psihomodo Pop, Eyesburn, Block Out, LUR, Disciplin A Kitschme, Pips, Chips & Videoclips, Dubioza Kolektiv, Marčelo, Darko Rundek, Darkwood Dub, Zemlja Gruva.	1900
3	2013	27–29 June	24,000		Smak, Babe, KBO!, Partibrejkers, Bajaga i Instruktori, Kanda, Kodža i Nebojša, E-Play, Pero Defformero, Ritam Nereda, Goblini, Hladno Pivo, Repetitor, Popečitelji, Eva Braun, Zaa.	1800
4	2014	26–28 June	25,000		Čovek Bez Sluha, Dubioza Kolektiv, Ničim Izazvan, Vlatko Stefanovski, Gibonni, Brainwashed, Atheist Rap, Bad Copy, Goblini, Sajsi MC & B.K.O, Marčelo & Iskaz, Violet.	1800
5	2015	25–27 June	21,000		Debela Nensi, Babe, Elemental, Hladno Pivo, Orthodox Celts, Ritam Nereda, Brkovi, S.A.R.S., Zabranjeno Pušenje, Forever Storm, Van Gogh, Goran Bregović & Weddings and Funerals Orchestra, Let 3.	1800
6	2016	24–26 June	23,000		Bajaga i Instruktori, Skunk Anansie, DJ David Lesse, Obojeni Program, Ničim Izazvan, Massimo Savić, KBO!, Eyesburn, Neno Belan, E-Play, Siddharta, Partibrejkers, Atheist Rap, Asian Dub Foundation, Beogradski Sindikat, Irish Stew of Sindidun.	1900
7	2017	22–24 June	30,000		Anthrax, Buzzcocks, Dub FX, Skindred, Thievery Corporation, Ana Popović, Rambo Amadeus, Damir Urban, Darko Rundek, Forever Storm, Goblini, Kerber, Orthodox Celts, Repetitor, Ritam Nereda, Brkovi, Elvis Jackson.	2300
8	2018	21–23 June	22,000		YU Grupa, The Kills, Editors, Marky Ramone, Dub Inc, Viva Vox, Jinx, Bad Copy, Kultur Shock, Plavi Orkestar, Enter Shikari, Morcheeba, Disciplin A Kitschme, Čovek Bez Sluha, Kolja, Let 3, Mortal Kombat, E-Play, Letu štuke, Nikola Vranjković, Nipplepeople.	3000
9	2019	19–22 June	32,000	Testament · Little Steven and the Disciples of Soul · Dr Nele Karajlić · Kurt Vile and the Violators	Vlatko Stefanovski Trio, Darko Rundek & Ekipa, Eyesburn, Hladno Pivo, Partibrejkers, Goblini, Mud Factory, Atomsko Sklonište, Ritam Nereda, Mile Kekin, Dejan Cukić & Spori Ritam Bend, Đorđe Miljenović, Red Fang, Buč Kesidi, Atheist Rap	2800
10	2020 (cancelled)	24–27 June	N/A	Sum 41 · Gogol Bordello · Yngwie Malmsteen · Dubioza Kolektiv	Still Corners, Inner Circle, Djaikovski	2000 (presale)
11	2021	24–26 June	23,000	Yngwie Malmsteen · Dubioza Kolektiv · Dub FX	Riblja Čorba, Bajaga & Instruktori, Hladno Pivo, Partibrejkers, Kolja, Kanda, Kodža i Nebojša, Osvajači, Orthodox Celts, Obojeni Program, Repetitor, Texas Flood, KBO!, Bjesovi	3000
12	2022	30 June–2 July	N/A	Gogol Bordello (cancelled) · Buč Kesidi · Negative · Rock El Clasico (Stefan Milenković & Dr Nele Karajlić) · Placebo · Roni Size · Ana Popović · Senidah · Van Gogh · Thievery Corporation · Goblini · Konstrakta	Električni Orgazam, Deca Loših Muzičara, Pips, Chips & Videoclips, Ritam Nereda, Sunshine, Zvoncekova Bilježnica, E-Play, Eyesburn (cancelled), Goran Bare & Majke, Tam, Inner Circle (cancelled), Six Pack, Popečitelji, Punkreas, Rundek & Ekipa	4000
13	2023	28 June–1 July	40,000	The 1975 (cancelled) · Parni Valjak feat. Igor Drvenkar · Buč Kesidi · Joker Out · The Cult · Clutch · Dubioza Kolektiv · Beogradski Sindikat · Smak+ · Gibonni · Parov Stelar · Pendulum DJ set	Sajsi MC, Kanda, Kodža i Nebojša, Let 3, Vlatko Stefanovski, Shortparis, Elemental, Nemanja Radulović & Orkestar Double Sens, Seun Kuti & Egypt 80, Bojana Vunturišević, Atheist Rap, Built to Spill, Kolja i Grobovlasnici, Zoster, Irish Stew, KBO!	5000
14	2024	27–29 June	10,000 (day 3 only)	Dogstar · Lil Pump · Zdravko Čolić & Simfonijski Orkestar	Asian Dub Foundation, Partibrejkers, Bijelo Dugme, Coby, Nouvelle Vague, Palaye Royale, Circa Waves, Sivert Høyem, Jarboli, Ritam Nereda, Goblini, Letu Štuke, E-Play, Mimi Mercedez, Ian Pooley, Iva Lorens	5500
15	2025	25–28 June	35,000	Massive Attack · Faithless · Michael Kiwanuka · The Hu	Rambo Amadeus, Sajsi MC, Bad Copy, Orthodox Celts, Ida Prester & Lollobrigida, Kanda, Kodža i Nebojša, Valentino Kanzyani, La Femme, Joker Out, Buč Kesidi, Zoster, Senidah, Bajaga i Instruktori, Rundek i Ekipa, Osvajači, Bjesovi, KBO!, Six Pack, Lavina	7500
16	2026	25–27 June	25,000	The Cardigans · Underworld · Paradise Lost	Partibrejkers, Jakov Jozinović, Lavina, Sonata Arctica, Napalm Death, Cockney Rejects, Negative, Matija Cvek, Concrete Sun, Aril Brikha, Konstrakta (cancelled), Destruction, Magnifico, The Hellfreaks, Obojeni Program, Tom Novy, S.A.R.S., Goran Bare & Majke, Babe, Silente, Repetitor, Timo Maas	8500
17	2027	24–26 June	TBD	Russel Crowe's Indoor Garden Party · Anti-Nowhere League · The Exploited	TBA	6000 (presale)

== See also ==
- List of electronic music festivals
