= Igor Vidmar =

Slovenian journalist

Igor Vidmar (born 10 December 1950) is a prominent Slovenian and former Yugoslav journalist, rock music promoter and manager, music producer and political activist.

== Biography ==
Vidmar was born in Ljubljana, Yugoslavia, but spent most of his childhood in Nova Gorica, where he attended the Nova Gorica Grammar School.

As an important personality in the Slovenian and Yugoslav rock scene, Vidmar worked with many artists, most of them having a cult status in the underground music scene, especially the punk rock of Slovenia and the former SFR Yugoslavia, such as the Yugoslav punk rock pioneers Pankrti and Paraf, the internationally acclaimed Laibach and many others. The tracks for the famous Yugoslav compilation album Novi Punk Val were compiled by him. He also worked in the only independent student radio existing in a communist country- Radio Student Ljubljana. As a concert organizer, he established the important Novi Rock festival, and brought numerous eminent international acts to Slovenia and/or Yugoslavia, including: 23 Skidoo, Amebix, Angelic Upstarts, Anti-Nowhere League, Christian Death, DOA, Dinosaur Jr., Discharge, Dubliners, Einstürzende Neubauten, The Fall, GBH, Henry Rollins, Iggy Pop, Jane's Addiction, The Jesus & Mary Chain, Killing Joke, The Mission, Nick Cave, Pere Ubu, Pixies, Ramones, Siouxsie and the Banshees, The Sisters of Mercy, Sonic Youth, UK Subs, Youth Brigade, Swans and others. He was also active in the famous ŠKUC Art Gallery.

His behaviour and his journalistic or artistic works, which were often too avant-garde and politically incorrect for the time, (intentionally or unintentionally) provoked reactions from the communist regime of the then-Socialist Republic of Slovenia and SFR Yugoslavia: he lost his membership in the ruling political party- the League of Communists of Slovenia, faced prosecution and even served short prison terms few times. He also criticized the Western imperialism as well. In 1983 he was arrested for wearing the Dead Kennedys Nazi Punks Fuck Off! badge with a crossed out swastika which was mistaken as a pro-nazi symbol. Namely, at that time the Communist authorities were obsessed witch hunting nazi punks, whom Vidmar never belonged to. In the next year, as a retaliation, he "tested" the authorities' and citizens' nerves by playing Deutschland über alles on the air in his radio show (a version performed by Nico). Although it is not a fascist song, the authorities and some of the listeners saw hidden allusions in his action and reacted. Soon he was on court again with an explanation that he wanted to test the "national defense preparement" and the reaction of the people against an eventual fascist provocation.

In the late 1980s, as the fall of Communism and the subsequent breakup of Yugoslavia were approaching, he supported the Slovenian opposition, human rights and pro-independence movements.

In a press interview regarding his work as a musical promoter published in the post-communist and post-Yugoslav period, Vidmar was quoted saying that despite the problems he once had with the previous system, "It is an irony that it is harder to work now in this liberal democracy, than in the final 10 years of SFRY's communism". The system of the non-aligned SFR Yugoslavia was not so rigid as the other communist states, such as those in the Eastern Bloc for instance, so most of the time the Yugoslav rock scene was left alone to work freely. For example, in 1982, Vidmar organized a concert in support of the independent Polish trade union Solidarity; he also worked with the highly provocative act Laibach, a member of the Neue Slowenische Kunst collective which used totalitarian Nazi art and Socialist Realism for artistic reasons as camp or for stirring controversy etc.
