= Glišić =

Glišić (Serbian: Глишић) is a Serbian surname. In Macedonian, it is spelled Glishikj (Macedonian: Глишиќ). It may refer to:

- Darko Glishikj (born 1991), Macedonian footballer
- Ivan Glišić (born 1942), Serbian writer and journalist
- Milovan Glišić (1847–1908), Serbian writer and translator
- Nikola Glišić (born 1999), Serbian footballer
