= Punk rock in Yugoslavia =

Punk rock in Yugoslavia was the punk subculture of the former Socialist Federal Republic of Yugoslavia. The most developed scenes across the federation existed in the Socialist Republic of Slovenia, the Adriatic coast of the Socialist Republic of Croatia, the Socialist Autonomous Province of Vojvodina and Belgrade, the capital of both Yugoslavia and the Socialist Republic of Serbia. Some notable acts included: Pankrti, Paraf, Pekinška patka, KUD Idijoti, Niet, Patareni and KBO!.

== History ==
The punk scene emerged in the late 1970s, influenced by the first wave of punk rock bands from the United Kingdom and the United States, such as the Sex Pistols, The Clash and the Ramones. The DIY punkzine scene also began to develop. The Yugoslav punk rock bands were the first ones formed in a communist country.

Punk rock spread across Yugoslavia in northwest–southeast direction, finding its earliest supporters in: Ljubljana, Rijeka, Zagreb, Novi Sad and other cities. The first punk rock bands in the country were Pankrti from Ljubljana and Paraf from Rijeka, both formed around 1977. Other notable acts were: Buldogi, Berlinski Zid, Grupa 92, Problemi, Termiti and others. Among this generation of bands was the early Prljavo kazalište, but they became a mainstream rock act later. These artists were featured on the compilation album "Novi Punk Val 78-80", compiled by Igor Vidmar. Meanwhile, in Novi Sad, the notable band Pekinška patka emerged.

The late-1970s and early 1980s bands from Belgrade included: Defektno Efektni, Urbana Gerila and Radnička Kontrola. Notable members of these bands were: Cane, who later came to prominence as a vocalist of Partibrejkers; Srđan Todorović, later a movie actor; and Vladimir Arsenijević, later a notable punk writer. This generation of bands was included on the Artistička Radna Akcija compilation.

Električni orgazam was also a punk rock band during its early period, but it became a mainstream rock act later. During this period, the punkabilly artist Toni Montano emerged, first as a vocalist of the band Radost Evrope, but later became a solo artist. Also, the punk writer Ivan Glišić from Šabac emerged in this period.

The first punk band in Skopje, is considered to be Fol jazik, formed in 1978. Other notable acts from Skopje included Badmingtons and Saraceni, both led by Vladimir Petrovski Karter. The bass player of Saraceni, Goran Trajkoski, previously played with Klime Kovaceski in the punk band Afektiven naboj from Struga. Later they went into post punk and gothic rock and together formed the bands Padot na Vizantija and Anastasia.

In Sarajevo, the following acts emerged: Ozbiljno pitanje (which later evolved into the mainstream act Crvena Jabuka), Ševa (later Bombaj Štampa led by the internationally acclaimed actor Branko Đurić), and the cult band Zabranjeno pušenje. These bands formed the punk-inspired New Primitives movement.

In the late 1970s, some punk bands were affiliated with the Yugoslav new wave scene, and were labeled as both punk rock and new wave. During a certain period, the term new wave music was interchangeable with punk. One of the most important compilations of the Yugoslav new wave era is Paket Aranžman.

The 1980s saw the emergence of streetpunk and Oi!, followed later by: hardcore punk and other subgenres. Notable hardcore punk acts during the 1980s included: Niet, U.B.R., Ćao pičke, Odpadki civilizacije, Tožibabe, III Kategorija, Stres DA, Epidemija and Quod Massacre (all from Ljubljana); S.O.R. (from Idrija); C.Z.D. (Maribor); Blitzkrieg, Z.R.M., Patareni and Sköl (Zagreb); KUD Idijoti, Gola jaja, Besposličari and Pasmaters (all from Pula); Rukopotezno povlačilo (Slavonska Požega); The Dissidents (Prijedor) and Ženevski Dekret (Mostar); Solunski front, Distress, Necrophilia, Crist and Mrgudi (all from Belgrade); KBO! (Kragujevac); Nade iz Inkubatora, Giuseppe Carabino, Marselyeza and Process (all from Subotica); Incest (Novi Bečej); Napred U Prošlost (Banatsko Novo Selo); and the Oi! or streetpunk bands Dva minuta mržnje and Vrisak generacije (both from Novi Sad).

A notable pop punk band during the 1980s was Psihomodo pop from Zagreb, which was very much influenced by the Ramones.

Many foreign punk bands played concerts in former Yugoslavia in the late 1970s and throughout the 1980s: The Ruts, Siouxsie and the Banshees, UK Subs, Angelic Upstarts, The Exploited, Charged GBH, The Anti-Nowhere League, Discharge, Youth Brigade and Amebix. In 1983 The Anti-Nowhere League released their album Live in Yugoslavia, while Angelic Upstarts released a live album of the same title in 1985.

=== Punk ideology ===
Although the Yugoslav punk musicians were working in a one-party state, they were still allowed to include social commentary in their songs, with only occasional cases of censorship. Anarcho-punk and Straight Edge scenes also existed, while some bands were purely nihilistic. The Yugoslav punk lyrics often included social and political criticism, anti-war, anti-chauvinist, anti-fascist, anti-authoritarian and anarchist messages, which was reflected in the bands' names, such as: Vrisak Hirošime (meaning: The Cry of Hiroshima), Apatridi (Stateless persons), The Dissidents (Dissidents), Patareni (Patarenes), Marselyeza (La Marseillaise), Stres Državnega Aparata (Stress Of The State Apparatus), Sistem Organizirane Represije (System Of Organized Repression), etc. But there were also many apolitical acts, whose songs dealt with personal subjects, humour, substance abuse, sex, or just innocent youth rebellion.

A significant scandal emerged in communist Yugoslavia when the authorities arrested a nazi punk and nazi skinhead group called The Fourth Reich in Ljubljana, in 1981. Though largely obscure, the band was put on trial and its members were imprisoned before having a chance to release any recordings or play live, hence leaving no legacy. They were also once turned down by the notable promoter and Pankrti's manager Igor Vidmar, who refused to sign them as he disapproved of their lyrics.

Although punk rock was tolerated in Yugoslavia, the system still viewed it with suspicion. The authorities used this scandal as an opportunity to label the movement as subversive and to indiscriminately persecute all punks and skinheads, although the majority of them was actually anti-fascist. Ironically, both Pankrti and KUD Idijoti have their respective cover versions of the Italian antifascist and communist song Bandiera Rossa.

The scandal led to moral panic. The authorities' reaction to punks, labeling them as "neonazis", reached its crescendo during the prosecution of Igor Vidmar, who was arrested for wearing the Dead Kennedys' Nazi Punks Fuck Off! badge with a swastika crossed out. That anti-fascist badge was misinterpreted as a "nazi provocation" and Vidmar was detained.

After the scandal faded, the Yugoslav punk scene continued to exist, albeit with less mainstream media coverage. While the first generation of bands such as: Pankrti, Paraf, Prljavo kazalište and Pekinška patka were well exposed in the media, having appearances on the public TV stations and record contracts for major labels such as: Jugoton, Suzy Records and ZKP RTL, the bands that came afterwards, faced problems and gained prominence only in the underground circles.

Also, some media considered punk rock outdated, so they turned their attention to other genres, leaving much of the new punk generation underestimated or unnoticed. This opinion was shared by some musicians, so for example, Paraf and Pekinška patka went post-punk, while Prljavo kazalište and Električni orgazam became conventional rock bands.

The late 1980s and early 1990s saw transition to parliamentary democracy, which brought liberalisation to the country, but also a rise in extreme nationalism, previously kept under control by the communist regime. These processes led to the breakup of SFR Yugoslavia.

Despite the problems that Igor Vidmar once had with the Yugoslav communist system, in an interview published in the post-communist and post-Yugoslav period, he was quoted saying: "It is an irony that it is harder to work now in this liberal democracy, than in the last 10 years of SFRY's communism".

=== The breakup of Yugoslavia ===
With the violent breakup of Yugoslavia in the early 1990s, its punk rock scene ceased to exist. Its former adherents took different positions on the issue. Some musicians participated in anti-war, anti-nationalist, and anti-fascist activities and were attacked by the nationalists in the independent countries that emerged after the breakup of Yugoslavia. Some musicians were forcibly mobilized and sent to the war, but others embraced nationalistic views (in their opinion, patriotic views) and voluntarily joined the armed forces and even saw active combat.

In 1992, the supergroup Rimtutituki featuring members of Partibrejkers, Električni orgazam and Ekatarina Velika released a pacifist single, but since the authorities didn't allow them to promote it with a gig, they performed on a truck trailer driven through the streets of Belgrade, as their stage. The Serbian musician Branislav Babić Kebra of Urbana Gerila and Obojeni program was mobilized in the army and sent to the war in Croatia, but he deserted with the help of his Croatian friend, Goran Bare of Majke. A 1993 compilation of anti-war punk songs, Preko zidova nacionalizma i rata (Over the walls of nationalism and war), included bands from the ex-Yugoslav countries. After the Ten Day War and the withdrawal of the Yugoslav Army from Slovenia, its former barracks were squatted and the Metelkova City Autonomous Cultural Center was established. Metelkova was attacked by nazi-skinheads because it hosted punk rockers, anarchists, anti-racist, ecological and lesbian and gay rights activists.

In Croatia, some musicians joined the Croatian forces. A notable example was Ivica Čuljak, better known as Satan Panonski, a punk singer, punk poet and body artist from Vinkovci. Before the war, he was a convict charged with homicide (in self defence) and he spent several years in mental institutions. He was an outspoken opponent of nationalism and was openly gay, but after the war began, he decided to join the Croatian forces. He was killed on January 27, 1992. Before the war, he was a close friend of Ivan Glišić, a punk writer from Serbia. Some musicians also performed live on the frontlines or recorded songs, such as "Hrvatska mora pobijediti" ("Croatia Must Win") by Psihomodo pop, which boosted the morale of poorly-armed Croatian forces. During this period, especially skinheads and football hooligans expressed nationalistic views.

The local punk scenes in the independent countries that emerged after the breakup of Yugoslavia continued to exist, some of them heavily suffering during the war. The underground music scene continued, even in the shelters during the Sarajevo siege, and a compilation album, Rock under siege (Radio Zid Sarajevo, Stichting Popmuziek Nederland), was released in 1995.

After Slovenia, Croatia, Macedonia, and Bosnia and Herzegovina proclaimed independence, and SFR Yugoslavia was dissolved, a new federal state comprising only Serbia and Montenegro, named "Federal Republic of Yugoslavia", was established. The punk rock bands in the Federal Republic of Yugoslavia included: Atheist rap, Ritam Nereda and Zbogom Brus Li from Novi Sad; Direktori and Šaht from Belgrade; and Goblini from Šabac.

=== 2000s and later ===
After the end of the war and the departure of nationalist leaders such as Slobodan Milošević and Franjo Tuđman, the former Yugoslav nations began to normalise their relations. Their music scenes could now restore their former cooperation. Anti-Nowhere League came once again to former Yugoslav soil (in Croatia) and released their live album, Return to Yugoslavia. In 2003 Igor Mirković from Croatia made the rockumentary Sretno dijete (Happy Child), named after a song by Prljavo kazalište. The movie covers the early Yugoslav Punk and new wave scene featuring artists from Zagreb, Ljubljana, and Belgrade. Inspired by "Sretno dijete", the rockumentary "Bilo jednom..." was made in 2006, featuring punk-rockers from Novi Sad who were active during the first half of the 1990s.

Current notable acts in the former Yugoslav countries include: Niet, Scuffy Dogs, Aktivna Propaganda, GUB, Pero Lovšin (formerly of Pankrti), Golliwog, In-Sane, Kreshesh Nepitash, No Limits, all from Slovenia; Hladno pivo, Pasi, KUD Idijoti, Let 3 (featuring the former Termiti member Damir Martinović Mrle), Kawasaki 3P, Fat Prezident, Deafness By Noise, Overflow, FOB, No More Idols, Hren, Lobotomija, Brkovi, Grupa tvog života, FNC Diverzant, Tito's Bojs and Gužva u 16ercu from Croatia; Superhiks, Two Sides, Noviot Pochetok, and Denny Te Chuva from the Republic of Macedonia; Red Union, Zbogom Brus Li, Atheist Rap, Six Pack, Vox Populi, SMF, BOL, Ritam Nereda, Šaht, Miki Pirs, Birtija, Prilično Prazni, KBO!, Potres, Gavrilo Princip, Zvoncekova Bilježnica, Mitesers, Pogon BGD, Hitman, Nor, Concrete Worms, Ringišpil, The Bayonets, The Bomber from Serbia, and others.

== Reunions ==
Pankrti played a reunion concert in Tivoli Hall in Ljubljana, Slovenia, on December 1, 2007, as a celebration of their 30th anniversary. They also toured across parts of former Yugoslavia with a new guitarist, Ivan Kral, who previously played with Patti Smith, Blondie, and Iggy Pop. Meanwhile, in Skopje, Republic of Macedonia, the group Badmingtons reformed, and their music was included in the soundtrack for the feature film Prevrteno (Upside Down), directed by Igor Ivanov Izy. At the Exit festival in Novi Sad on July 13, 2008, Pekinška Patka played a reunion concert, sharing the stage with the Sex Pistols, who played afterwards that evening.

== Related movies ==
- Dečko koji obećava
- Sretno dijete
- Outsider
- Bilo jednom...
- Pejzaži u magli
- Kako je propao Rocknroll

== See also ==
- SFR Yugoslav pop and rock scene
- New wave music in Yugoslavia
- Novi Punk Val
- Paket aranžman
- Artistička Radna Akcija
- New Primitives
- Neue Slowenische Kunst
- Yugoton

== Bibliography ==
- Dragan Pavlov and Dejan Šunjka. (1990) Punk u Jugoslaviji (Punk in Yugoslavia). Yugoslavia: IGP Dedalus.(in Serbian, Croatian, and Slovene)
- Janjatović, Petar. Ilustrovana Enciklopedija Yu Rocka 1960-1997, publisher: Geopoetika, 1997 (in Serbian)
- Janjatović, Petar. EX YU ROCK enciklopedija 1960-2006. ISBN 978-86-905317-1-4
- Janjatović, Petar. Drugom stranom - Almanah novog talasa u SFRJ (co-authors David Albahari and Dragan Kremer), 1983
- Sava Savić and Igor Todorović Novosadska punk verzija (Novi Sad Punk version), publisher: Studentski Kulturni Centar Novi Sad, 2006 ISBN 86-85983-05-3
