= Zvoncekova Bilježnica =

- Also known as: Zvonceki
- Origin: Aranđelovac, Serbia
- Genres: Punk rock, hardcore punk, post punk
- Years active: 1988 – present
- Labels: Take It Or Leave It Records, Neprijatelj Prelazi Rijeku Records, Hi-Fi Centar
- Formerly of: KBO!
- Members: Svetislav Todorović; Saša Vujić; Andreja Vlajić; Vuk Stefanović
- Past members: Darko Branković; Ivan Matić; Dejan Novaković; Dragan Vesković; Dragan Mitić; Vlada Janković; Slobodan Vujić; Nenad Jakovljević; Branko Lazarević
- Website: Official Myspace page

Zvoncekova Bilježnica (Serbian Cyrillic: Звонцекова Биљежница; trans. Zvoncek's Notebook) is a Serbian punk rock/hardcore punk band from Aranđelovac.

== History ==
The band was formed in 1988 by the former Kralj Vuk member Svetislav Todorović "Tozza Rabassa" (vocal) with Darko Branković (backing vocals), Dejan Novaković "Fumarone" (bass), Dragan Vesković "Vesko" (drums), Dragan Mitić "Mita" (guitar) and Vlada Janković "Tripon" (guitar). By the end of 1988, the band had already started performing live and released their official demo release, studio release, Lorka nije pisao moju pesmu (Lorca Did Not Write My Song).

In 1991, the band released a live compilation album consisting of selected live recordings made from 1988 until 1991 entitled Retrospektiva '88-'91 (A Retrospective '88-91), after which the band lineup had changed and on the departure of the remaining members, Toza, with KBO! members Saša Vujić "Vuja" (guitar) and Slobodan Vujić "Boban" (drums), continued working, but moving towards a more melodic punk rock sound.

The new lineup started recording new material at the Kragujevac Češnjak studio, owned by the Vujić brothers. The recordings resulted in the release of the second demo album Inženjeri ljudskih duša (Human Soul Engineers), which got the name by a Stalin's definition for artists, which beside their own material also featured cover versions of the Devo song "Mongoloid" and the Termiti song "Vjeran pas" ("Faithful Dog").

Two years later, in 1994, the band released their first studio album, Mrzim svoju mesnu zajednicu (I Hate My Municipality), released by Take It Or Leave It Records on both MC and 300 copy limited edition LP, featuring a cover version of the Paraf single "Moj život je novi val" ("My Life is New Wave"), and a cover version of the song made by the original band member Vlada Janković "Tripon". Song's original title "Prijatelju" was changed to "Brus-Walter na golu Sarajeva". The album, recorded at the Češnak studio from December 1993 until March 1994 and produced by Saša Vujić, also featured the original band members Dragan Vesković "Vesko" (harp, oboe) and Dejan Novaković "Fumarone" (bass). In order to promote the album, the band recorded their first promotional video, for the track "A slanina, slanina forever" ("But Bacon, Bacon Forever").

In 1996, the band performed at the Belgrade KST at a concert organized by the TV Politika show Paket Aranžman (Package Deal), featuring prominent Serbian bands performed cover versions of punk songs, and the live versions of "Moj život je novi val", "Mongoloid" and "Vjeran pas", recorded at the event, were released on the live various artists compilation Punk You All by Hi-Fi Centar. At the fifth anniversary celebration of the Paket Aranžman TV show, the band appeared as one of the performers and the live versions of the songs "Balkanski varvari" ("Barbarians from The Balkans") and "Aluvijalne ravni" ("Alluvial Plains") appeared on the live various artists compilation Svi protiv svih (Everybody Against Everyone), released in 1998 by Hi-Fi Centar.

During the same year, the band founded their own independent record label Neprijatelj Prelazi Rijeku Records (The Enemy Is Crossing the River Records) under which they released their second studio album Gavrilov princip (Gavrilo's Principle, a pun for Gavrilo Princip's name), produced by Saša Vujić, which, beside the three, featured the new bassist Nenad Jakovljević "Jakob". Not minding the witty titles, the material, including "Toširo Mifune A Kolo", "Koka Kolo", "Ska kolo" and "Dilerovo kolo", dealt with serious social topics.

In 2002, Todorović and Saša Vujić had cameo appearances in the Ðorde Milosavljević movie Ringeraja, performing a cover version of the Indexi hit "Bacila je sve niz rijeku" ("She Had Thrown Away Everything Down The River").

On early 2011, the band started a mini-tour promoting the upcoming studio album '’Beš muziku uz koju ne može da se igra (Fuck The Music You Cannot Dance To), expected to be released during the same year. Album was in making since early 2000's. In 2013, the band released the single "Samo pravo" ("Just Straight Ahead"), featuring rock journalist Petar Janjatović as guest.

In the autumn of 2014, the band participated in a tribute album to Novembar, entitled Tako mlad i tako čist (So Young and So Clean), with a cover of Novembar song "Buntovnik" ("Rebel").

In 2016, the band finally released the new album '’Beš muziku uz koju ne može da se igra (Fuck The Music You Cannot Dance To)". It was produced by Saša Vujić and released under Neprijatelj Prelazi Rijeku Records. The album was described by critics as a "synthesis of hardcore and melodic punk with a plenty of post punk characteristics". Album had a huge success, and it was placed in Radio Beograd 202's list of 10 best albums released in Serbia that year. Band continues to work to this day and even had appearances on remarkable festivals such as Arsenal fest in Kragujevac and Belgrade Beer fest.

== Discography ==
=== Official demo releases ===
- Lorka nije pisao moju pesmu (1988)
- Inženjeri ljudskih duša (1992)

=== Studio albums ===
- Mrzim svoju mesnu zajednicu (1994)
- Gavrilov princip (1998)
- 'Beš muziku uz koju ne može da se igra (2016)

=== Live albums ===
- Retrospektiva '88-'91 (1991)

=== Other appearances ===
- "Moj život je novi val" / "Mongoloid" / "Vjeran pas" (Punk You All; 1998)
- "Balkanski varvari" / "Aluvijalne ravni" (Svi protiv svih; 1998)
- "Buntovnik" (Tako mlad i tako čist; 2014)
