= Butch Cassidy (disambiguation) =

Butch Cassidy was an American outlaw named Robert LeRoy Parker (1866–1908).

Butch Cassidy may also refer to:

- Butch Cassidy (singer), stage name of Danny Elliott Means II (born 1973), American singer
- Butch Cassidy's Wild Bunch, an American outlaw gang
- Butch Cassidy (TV series), an American children's animated television series
- Butch Cassidy and the Sundance Kid, a 1969 American Western film
- Bruce Cassidy (born 1965), Canadian ice hockey coach and former player nicknamed "Butch"
- Buč Kesidi, Serbian indie rock band

== See also ==
- Butch and Cassidy, characters in the Pokémon anime television series
