= Ivan Glišić =

Serbian musician

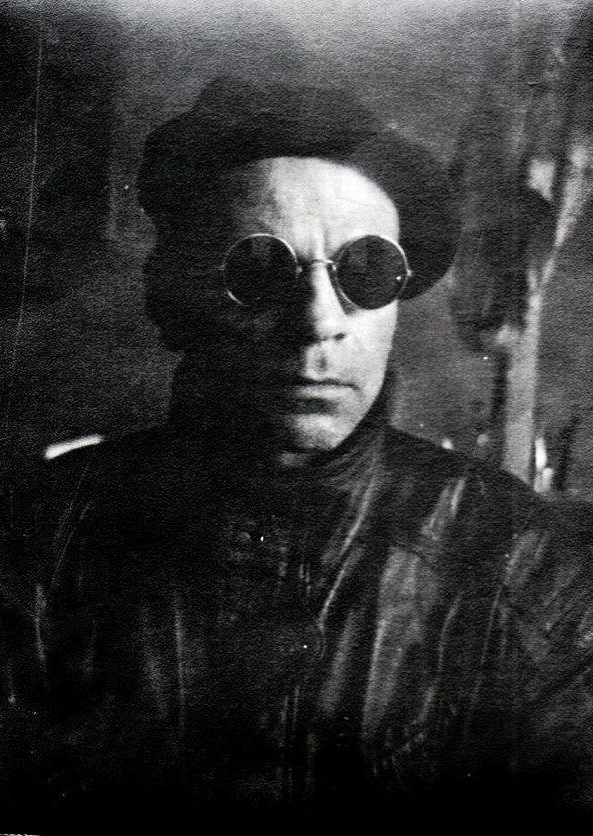
- Glišić in 1992
- Born: 14 June 1942 (age 84); Pirot, Serbia
- Occupations: Writer, painter, journalist
- Years active: 1960–present
- Movement: Punk
- Parent(s): Aleksandar.

Ivan Glišić (Serbian Cyrillic: Иван Глишић; born 1942) is an intellectual, writer, artist, journalist and songwriter who achieved prominence both in Serbia and across the former Yugoslavia. He was involved in the Yugoslav pop and rock and even folk music scene, and beside his mainstream success, being one of the pioneers of the Yugoslav punk rock, he also gained a status of an underground culture celebrity.

== Biography ==
=== Beginnings ===
Ivan Glišić was born in 1942 during World War II in Yugoslavia in Pirot, Serbia, but 10 years later he moved with his family to Šabac, his new hometown in what was then the Socialist Republic of Serbia. He became interested in rock-n-roll in the late 1950s as a teenager, after hearing artists such as Tommy Steele, Cliff Richard and The Drifters on Radio Luxembourg, which was a usual source for music information of the Yugoslav youths of the time. In the following years, throughout the early 1960s he became a fan of The Beatles and The Rolling Stones, and an avid record collector, although, bizarrely, he didn't have a record player yet. He purchased his first one in 1964 together with a group of friends, who were also rock music fans and with whom he participated in his hometown's rock subculture. Although they faced occasional problems with the authorities, they were permitted to use the publicly owned youth cultural centre, such as all major towns in Yugoslavia had, for their musical and artistic activities. There emerged art collectives, youth magazines and a writing workshops led by Glišić, and several local bands were formed, such as Čivije, Slatki Limunovi and Baš Čelik, while concert was held by the prominent group Siluete from Belgrade. Ivan Glišić's favourite artists at the time included: The Who, Pretty Things, The Kinks, The Animals, The Troggs and Them. He was impressed by the 1960s social revolution, but gradually became disillusioned with it. His heroes, The Beatles, received MBE by the Queen, and during a certain period, went into what he perceived as escapism under Maharishi's influence, instead of supporting the then vibrant student movement, especially active during the global protests of 1968, which also took place in Yugoslavia, leaving strong impressions on Glišić.

=== Songwriter ===
In the early 1970s, Ivan Glišić became involved in the pop and rock music scene of Zagreb, then Socialist Republic of Croatia, where he cooperated with the notable group Roboti, whose bassist was Rajmond Ruić. As a tandem consisting of Glišić as a songwriter, and Ruić as a composer and arranger, they were active in writing songs for the prominent Croatian pop and rock artists: Josipa Lisac, Time, Darko Domjan and Dalibor Brun, achieving great prominence not only in Croatia, but also in the wider Yugoslav pop and rock scene.

Glišić was eventually employed by former Yugoslav major label, the Zagreb-based Jugoton. paying for weekly round trip-airline tickets from Belgrade to Zagreb, and providing accommodation in hotels and recording schedules. Glišić went to Zagreb every Sunday and returned to Šabac every weekend.

Some of his successful hits included "Ulica jorgovana" and "Laku noć, Katarina" performed by Darko Domjan. Glišić also participated in many domestic and international music festivals and was awarded on several occasions.

He joined Nikola Karaklajić, one of the first Yugoslav rock DJ's, who ran a famous radio show on Radio Belgrade called Veče uz radio (An Evening by the Radio). Glišić wrote the lyrics for the show's "anthem" which was recorded jointly by the groups S.O.S. and Zajedno. The former included Miša Aleksić, also a co-author of the song, while the latter, Bora Đorđević. They both later formed the prominent Serbian rock act Riblja Čorba. The second co-author was Laza Ristovski, the keyboardist of the Bosnian and Yugoslav cult band Bijelo dugme.

During the 1970s, Glišić wrote lyrics for various rock bands, such as: the aforementioned S.O.S., Rondo, Tetrapak, and others. After finishing his university studies, he became a school teacher, and also wrote lyrics for the rock band Mudra sova consisting of his pupils, early teenagers. Initially, the band was successful, it released its first single promoted with a well attended live gig and recorded the material for its first LP. However some media criticised Glišić, claiming that he abused his position for manipulating children, therefore he abandoned the whole thing. Unusually, although he was into pop and rock music, Glišić also began writing songs for pop folk acts as well, including Lepa Brena and her backing band Slatki greh who became very popular across Yugoslavia in the 1980s.

Glišić and Jugoton had a fruitful co-operation, and his royalties were regularly received on his bank account, however as the break-up of Yugoslavia was evidently approaching, he was suggested by Jugoton, which was located in Croatia, to withdraw his payments and transfer them into a bank in his homeland Serbia. Glišić followed the advice, but during the 1990s economic and political turmoil in Milošević's led Serbia, he lost them all.

=== Literature ===
Ivan Glišić is an author of many literary works, some published as books, some in the press, including poetry, prose, essays etc. He also received several literary awards. His works include (Serbian language titles): "Jer znala je mama, mene će skrckati levi elementi", "Zdravo Kolumbo, ovde Amerika", "Plastično lice", "Rock and roll Warriors", "Dogfucker", "Ura, ura, matura", "Loši dečaci", "Ponoćni očajnik", "Čizme slobode", "Mars, punk struggle for life", "La džungla ili Niža rasa", "Diler – Život u svetlosti", "Bure i osame Miloša Crnjanskog", "Mikelanđelo – avanture tela i duha", "Ključ od sebe ili Isidora Sekulić", the series of books titled "Gorila" and many others. He also finished and redacted the posthumous autobiography "Zub šestica" by Dušan Savković. Unusually, Glišić never held a public book promotion, as a result of a bad experience from the early 1970s, when his first poetry book "Svadbarenje" was widthdrawn from the book stores and its promotion was banned. The reason for this was that the book reviewer was Mika Antić, its cover was designed by Milić od Mačve, while the poetry reader at the event should have been Zoran Radmilović, all of whom the communist regime considered suspicious and somewhat dissident at that moment. After becoming affiliated with the punk subculture in the late 1970s, Glišić became one of the first punk writers in Yugoslavia.

=== Punk ===
After graduating university studies and becoming a school professor, Ivan Glišić went to London, UK in the late 1970s on an excursion with his students. There he got acquainted himself with punk rock, new wave and the skinhead subculture, and had an opportunity to watch The Adverts performing live, but also he witnessed the violent clashes between punks and teddy boys. He embraced punk as it reminded him of his youth's music and rebellion, and after returning home, he formed a band called N.T. (an abbreviation for novi talas, meaning in "new wave" in Serbian) consisting of some of his students who accompanied him in London, and himself as vocalist. Soon before it recorded its first single, the Mudra sova event described before repeated itself. The group split as the student's parents forbade them from hanging around with Glišić any more, and he was expelled from his workplace. He heavily involved himself in the Yugoslav punk and hardcore punk scene, publishing D.I.Y. punkzines featuring his punk literature and punk visual art. His favourite groups included: The Damned, Generation X, Dead Kennedys, The Lurkers, Magazine, UK Subs, Rich Kids, The Exploited and others.

During this period Glišić became close friend with Satan Panonski, the controversial punk musician, poet and body artist from Vinkovci area, Socialist Republic of Croatia, notorious not only for his excessive behaviour, stage performance, transvestitism and homosexuality, but also because he was serving in a psychiatric hospital following a homicide he committed. After a mail correspondence, the two met each other on several occasions, whenever the latter was permitted to leave the institution on a time off for socialisation for a good behaviour. One of the meetings took place on a concert performed by the prominent British band Charged GBH. After the dissolution of Yugoslavia and the Yugoslav Wars broke out, they maintained the contact although under very harsh circumstances using the Red Cross as a mediator. According to some media reports, Satan Panonski, embraced nationalist chauvinism, although he was previously known to be uncompromisingly against it. After learning about this, Glišić tried to reach him by phone from Budapest, in neighbouring Hungary, where he went on a Nick Cave concert. He succeeded to find him, and during the conversation, Satan Panonski denied the allegations. However, reportedly, he joined the Croatian forces during the War in Croatia, and he was killed in action.

Ivan Glišić opposed the war and supported the opposition represented by Otpor! against Slobodan Milošević who ruled the then so called Federal Republic of Yugoslavia. The struggle resulted with Milošević's fall during the Bulldozer Revolution in 2000. Currently, Glišić is still an active participant in the cultural life of Serbia, including literature, art exhibitions, literary contests etc.

== List of books ==
Prose

- Dogfucker
- Čizme Slobode
- Plastično Lice
- Smorvil
- Bure i osame Miloša Crnjanskog
- Mikelanđelo
- Amor u Borinom vranju
- Moje druženje s Lorensom
- Moje druženje s Milovanom Glišićem
- Žuti ker
- Ponoćni očajnik
- La Džungla, niža rasa
- Loši Dečaci
- Ura!Ura!Matura!
- Rock 'n' Roll Warriors
- Pozitivno ludilo
- Deca ulice
- Lađa Argo
- Mozak u tegli
- Pasja nedelja
- Šljamhaus
- Kabare Čivija
- Gvozdeni jahač – Gorila IV
- Ekskurzije u svetlost
- Vodič kroz Krležu
- Šabac moje mladosti
- Slike sa izložbe ili Teorija zaokreta
- Jer znala je mama mene će skrckati levi elementi
- Zdravo Kolumbo ovde Amerika
- Crvena zevalica
- Diler – Život u svetlosti
- Orlove Kandže
- Cvrčak
- Goli sin
- Pazolini – varijacije na jedan život i jednu smrt

Poetry

- Pastir kraj vatre
- Jesenjin
- Lorka je umro od ljubavi
- Kamenolom ljubavi
- Upomoć! Bitlsi!
- Sve što znam o Junkyu ili gde je pogrešio Majakovski
- Lađa Arđo
- Ljubav preko oglasa
- Orfej
- Ratni album
- Srpski cvetnik
- Svadbarenje
- Pesme o Pesniku
- Moje pesme moji snovi

Punk

- Dogfucker
- Čizme Slobode
- Plastično Lice
- Žuti ker
- Šljamhaus
- La Džungla, niža rasa
- Loši Dečaci
- Ura!Ura!Matura!
- Rock 'n' Roll Warriors
- Deca ulice
- Slikarsko pesnička poema
- Oi! This is Serbia!
- Šabački graffiti
- Mozak u tegli
- Diler – Život u svetlosti
- Deca starog Bakunjina
- Diler – Život u svetlosti
- Bunkerbuster klub Belih Miševa
- Ponoćni očajnik
- Nuda veritas – Gola istina
- Polni život
- Sveta devalvacija
- Orlove Kandže
- Rat žena

== See also ==
- Igor Vidmar
- Aleksandar Prokopiev
