= Fol Jazik =

- Fol Jazik in 1979

Background information
- Origin: Skopje, Macedonia
- Genres: Punk rock, hardcore punk, Yugoslavian punk
- Occupation: Punk rockers
- Years active: 1978–1980

The Fol Jazik (Macedonian: Фол Јазик; English translation: Fake Tongue) is considered to be the first Macedonian punk rock band, founded in Skopje by Vlado Hristov – KRLE (vocals) in 1978. The band members were: Vlado Hristov – KRLE (vocals), Saso Nikolovski – GZLA (drums), Petar Georgievski – PERO KAMIKAZA (bass), Bratislav Grkovic – BATA PANKER (guitar). The band has recorded two songs, "Children of the XXth century" and "Advertisement", and has appeared in several rock festivals in Skopje (Boom Rock Festival, Skopski Rock Festival and others). In a short period of time, they achieved huge popularity in Macedonian and ex Yugoslavian scene. The band is still considered to be one of the most eccentric and controversial bands in former Yugoslav music, with music, stage, energy, and explosivity. In the middle of 1979, they were disbanded.

In 1979, the singer Vlado Hristov – KRLE (vocals) formed a new structure of Fol Jazik, with Vladimir Petrovski – KARTER (guitar), Branko Spasovski – PUMA (bass) and Spend Ibraimi – SPEND (drums). They had many concerts in Skopje and Macedonia and they record 10 demo tapes (but at this moment they are lost) In the end of the 1980 this band has disband.

Fol Jazik left a deep influence over Macedonian punk rock scene for generation of musicians to come.

== See also ==
- Music of the Republic of Macedonia
- Punk rock in Yugoslavia
- Popular music in the Socialist Federal Republic of Yugoslavia
