= Niet =

Rock band from Slovenia

NIET

Background information
- Origin: Ljubljana, Slovenia
- Genres: Punk rock, hardcore punk
- Years active: 1983–1988; 1993–1994; 2008–2017; 2019–
- Members: Borut Marolt; Igor Dernovšek; Janez Brezigar; Robert Likar; Tomaž Bergant
- Past members: Primož Habič (deceased); Tomaž Dimnik; Tanja Ukmar; Šani Kolbezen; Tadej Vobovnik; Slavc Colnarič; Aleš Češnovar (deceased)

Niet is a punk rock and hardcore punk band from Ljubljana, Slovenia. They were one of the most iconic and influential music groups of the Slovenian punk movement and the punk rock in Yugoslavia in general. The band was active from 1983 to 1988, from 1993 to 1994 and 2008 to 2017 and has been active since December 2019.

== Band members ==
First era (1983–1988)

- Primož Habič - vocals (1983–1988)
- Igor Dernovšek - guitar (1983–1988)
- Aleš Češnovar - bass (1983–1988)
- Tomaž Dimnik - drums (1983–1985)
- Tanja Ukmar - female vocals (1984–1985)
- Tomaž Bergant - drums (1985–1988)
- Robert Likar - guitar (1985–1988)

Second era (1993–1994)

- Igor Dernovšek - guitar, vocals (1993–1994)
- Šani Kolbezen - guitar (1993–1994)
- Tadej Vobovnik - bass (1993–1994)
- Slavc Colnarič - drums (1993–1994)

The return (2008–2017)

- Borut Marolt - vocals
- Igor Dernovšek - guitar
- Aleš Češnovar - bass (2008-2010)
- Janez Brezigar - bass (2010-2017)
- Robert Likar - guitar
- Tomaž Bergant - drums

== Discography ==
- Srečna mladina (1984, FV založba)
- Niet (1993, Kif Kif)
- Live (1995, Vinilmanija)
- Lep dan za smrt (1996, Vinilmanija)
- Bil je maj (2008, Menart Records)
- Izštekani na Valu 202 (2008, ZKP RTVS)
- Trinajst (2010, ZKP RTVS)
- Rokovnjači (2012, ZKP RTVS)
- V bližini ljudi (2015, ZKP RTVS)

== See also ==
- SFR Yugoslav pop and rock scene
- New wave music in Yugoslavia
- https://web.archive.org/web/20131203003007/http://www.niet.si/
- Niet Official (Facebook)
