= Buč Kesidi =

Serbian indie rock band

Buč Kesidi Буч Кесиди
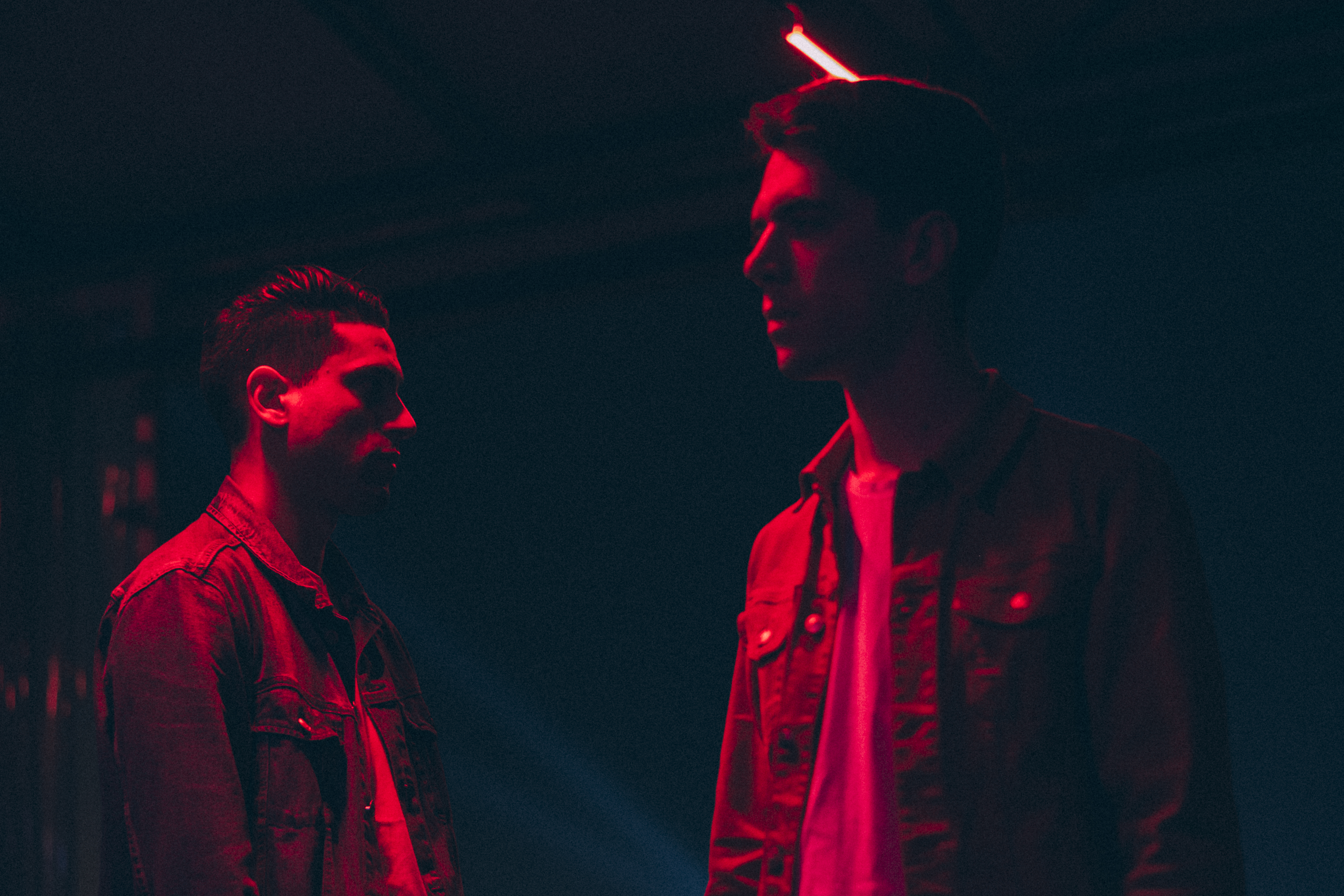
- Zoran Zarubica (left) and Luka Racić (right)

Background information
- Origin: Pančevo, Serbia
- Genres: Indie rock; indie pop; electropop; art pop
- Years active: 2013–present
- Label: Kontra
- Members: Luka Racić; Zoran Zarubica
- Past members: Alen Duš
- Website: buckesidi.com

Buč Kesidi (Serbian Cyrillic: Буч Кесиди, pronounced [bûtʃ kêsidi], Serbian for "Butch Cassidy") is a Serbian indie rock band from Pančevo, formed in 2013.

== History ==
=== 2013–2016: Formation and debut album ===
The band was formed in 2013 by Luka Racić (guitar, vocals, keyboards), Zoran Zarubica (drums, vocals) and Alen Duš (bass guitar, backing vocals). All three members have known each other from high-school, and have been playing together in various cover bands since 2009, the last one being "Aleksandar Mitrović i bend", which covered former Yugoslavian pop, rock, new wave, and 1960s schlager songs.

With aspirations to write original songs, Racić, Zarubica and Duš go on to form Buč Kesidi, and start rehearsing the first original songs written by Racić and Zarubica – "Jaa (imam plaan)", "Draga", "Čekam te", "Ne mogu da". During this period, the band begin their collaboration with music producer Milan Bjelica, and the recording studio Studio Krokodil, run by Pančevo-based musicians Petar and Vuk Stevanović from the band Ljubičice.

In November 2015, Buč Kesidi release their first single for the song "Jaa (imam plaan)" with an accompanying music video. This release also marks the beginning of the band's collaboration with publishing label Lampshade Media. The single is soon followed by their first EP, "Španska serija", released in early 2016 and consisting of the songs "Jaa (imam plaan)", "Draga?" and "Pola pet".

The band finished writing and recording their debut album "Posesivno-ospulsivni hospul" during 2016, and released it on November. The album, as the singles before it, was recorded, engineered, mixed and mastered in Studio Krokodil in Pančevo, written by Buč Kesidi and produced by Milan Bjelica, and has spawned a further four music videos, for the songs "Pola pet", "Stani!! Stani!!!" (directed by Duš), "Draga?" and "Kafe aparat".

=== 2017–2020: Nema ljubavi u klubu, Euforija and regional success ===
During 2017, the band have started writing songs for their next album, most notably "Nema ljubavi u klubu", which was decided to be the next single. After a series of regional concerts promoting "Posesivno-ospulsivni hospul", bass guitarist Alen Duš decides to leave the band, citing disinterest in further work. "Nema ljubavi u klubu" was recorded during the summer of 2017, and released as a single in November 2017 with an accompanying music video, under the label Kontra.

After a period of looking for a replacement for Duš, including a few concerts during 2017 with other bass players, the band decide to continue working and playing as a duo, with Zarubica now taking the role of lead vocal and principal songwriting alongside Racić. This has also induced a shift in the band's sound, moving on from a traditional guitar-driven indie rock setup to a more modern production, which included the use of synthesizers and a more layered production while recording, and live use of samples and guitar effects to achieve a fuller sound.

This gradual sonic change, along with the success of "Nema ljubavi u klubu", has quickly started attracting a wider audience and more media coverage for the band. In 2018 the band quickly released a follow up single, "Đuskanje ne pomaže", the first song featuring Zoran Zarubica on lead vocals. This single was met with equal praise, and an increasing interest for the band's second album it announced.

"Euforija" was published in November 2019, after the band's appearance on a series of summer festivals, including Arsenal Fest, Belgrade Beer Fest, and EXIT Festival's Main Stage, and the release of a third single "TIHO" in August, again featuring Zarubica on lead vocals but presenting a calmer atmosphere. The album featured 10 songs, with Racić and Zarubica taking the role of lead vocal and principal songwriter on 5 of the 10 songs each. The album was once again recorded and engineered in Studio Krokodil, and produced by Milan Bjelica. Along with Racić and Zarubica, the album featured musicians Petar Pupić on many of the recorded synthesizer and keyboard parts, and Petar Stevanović, who recorded most bass guitar parts, as well as some additional guitar and piano sections.

A music video for the song "Subota" was released alongside the album, and the release was followed by a regional promotional tour of the album, which began in November 2019, and featured sold-out concerts in Belgrade, Novi Sad, Niš, Zagreb, Sarajevo, Skopje, among other cities. After a short break in February, the tour was planned to continue throughout 2020, but was forcefully stopped by the COVID-19 pandemic.

In August 2020 the band released the song "Nedelja ujutru" as a single. The music video for "Nedelja ujutru" was shot on 35 mm film. In November 2020 "Euforija" was released on a limited series of red vinyl, previously only being available digitally.

=== 2021–present: Resurgence of concerts and third album ===
In July 2021, the band kicked off their first post-pandemic festival tour by headlining the main stage of EXIT Festival. Between 2021 and 2023 the band performed at over fifty regional festival and concert shows in Serbia, Croatia, Bosnia and Herzegovina, Montenegro, North Macedonia and Slovenia.

The band released the first single from the yet unnamed third album, Curimo po asfaltu, in December 2022. This was followed by further two singles, Skupi snagu and Trebaš mi in the following year.

2023 saw the band play their biggest solo shows to date, sold-out shows in Novi Sad's Spens sports centre, Zagreb's Šalata sports centre, and Tašmajdan stadium in Belgrade, along with further regional touring.

They were originally set to compete in the Pesma za Evroviziju '25 with there song “Tužne ljubavi” for a spot in Eurovision Song Contest 2025, but were later disqualified as they had performed the song before September 1.

== Band members ==
Current members

- Luka Racić – lead vocals, lead and rhythm guitar (2013–present) backing vocals (2018–present)
- Zoran Zarubica – lead vocals (2018–present) drums, percussion, backing vocals (2013–present)

Former members

- Alen Duš – bass guitar, backing vocals (2013–2017)

== Discography ==
=== Studio albums ===
- Posesivno-ospulsivni hospul (2016)
- Euforija (2019)
- Moderne veze (2025)

=== Singles and EPs ===
- "Jaa (imam plaan)" (2015)
- "Španska serija (EP)" (2016)
- "Nema ljubavi u klubu" (2017)
- "Đuskanje ne pomaže" (2018)
- "TIHO" (2018)
- "Nedelja ujutru" (2020)
- "Curimo po asfaltu" (2022)
- "Skupi snagu" (2023)
- "Trebaš mi" (2023)
- ”Tužne ljubavi” (2024)

=== Live albums ===
- Euforija uživo (2021)

== Awards and nominations ==
Year	Award	Category	Result
2020	IMPALA European Independent Album of the Year Award	Independent Album of the Year (for Euforija)	Nominated
2020	2020 Music Awards Ceremony	Alternative Pop Song of the Year (for Nema ljubavi u klubu)	Won
2021	Runda Award	Best Performer	Won
2023	2023 Music Awards Ceremony	Album of the Year (for Euforija uživo)	Nominated
2023	2023 Music Awards Ceremony	Concert of the Year (for their concert in Banovina, Niš)	Nominated
2023	2023 Music Awards Ceremony	Rock Song of the Year (for Idemo do hodnika (uživo))	Won
2023	Runda Award	Best Performer	Won
