= The Hellfreaks =

Hungarian rock band

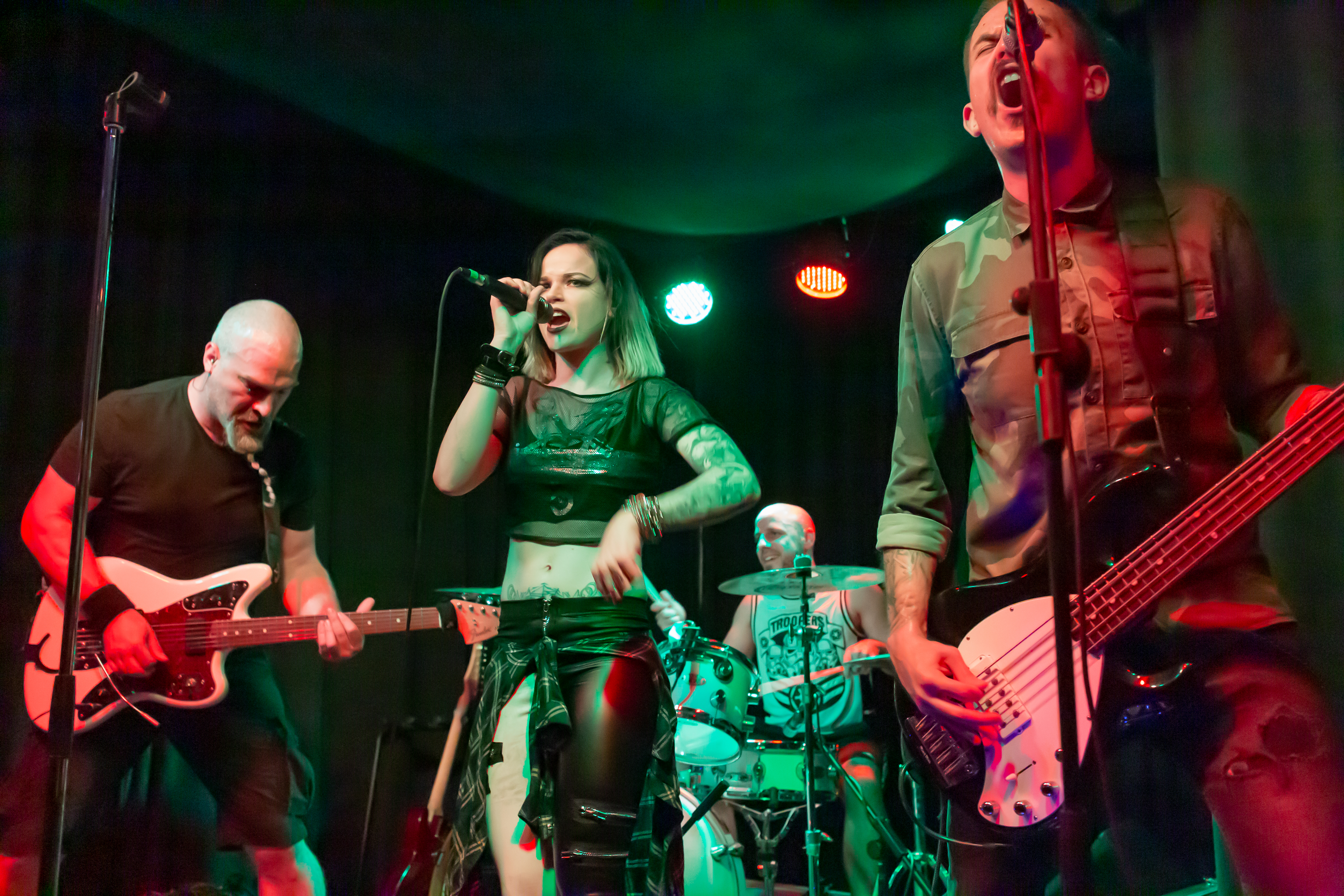
- The Hellfreaks at a concert in Erfurt, Germany on 2 November 2018

Background information
- Origin: Budapest, Hungary
- Genres: Punk rock; psychobilly; horror punk; Hard Rock; Alternative metal; Gothic metal
- Years active: 2009–present
- Label: Napalm Records
- Members: Shakey Sue; József Takács; Gábor Domján; Béla Budai
- Past members: See below

The Hellfreaks are a Hungarian punk rock band from Budapest, formed in 2009. Originally a psychobilly band, the band switched to punk rock on their third album Astoria.

== History ==
The Hellfreaks were formed in February 2009. However, the band's history began back in 2007 when the two founders played in a surf psycho band called Los Tiki Torpedoes. Freaky Tiki was a guitarist and Shakey Sue was a drummer. After many performances together, the two decided in 2009 that they wanted to take a harder musical stance. This is how The Hellfreaks were formed, who stylistically locate themselves between psychobilly, horror punk and metal.

In 2010, they released their first album entitled Hell, Sweet Hell. Their second album, Circus of Shame, was released in the summer of 2012, which was pressed on red vinyl in a limited edition in addition to the CD.

After the band hadn't been heard from for a long time, Shakey Sue announced in early 2015 that the band was back with a new line-up and that they would be touring in the US and Europe in 2015 and 2016. The double bass was replaced by an electric bass.

The Hellfreaks released their third studio album Astoria in 2016, with which the band says it represents a change in style from psychobilly/horrorpunk to female fronted modern punk-rock-riot! was completed. The style on Astoria is reminiscent of the early sound of the band The Distillers. They released their fourth album God on the Run in 2020. On 14 April 2023, The Hellfreaks released their fifth studio album, Pitch Black Sunset. On the same day, they released their music video for PBSS, which is their abbreviated title track for that album.

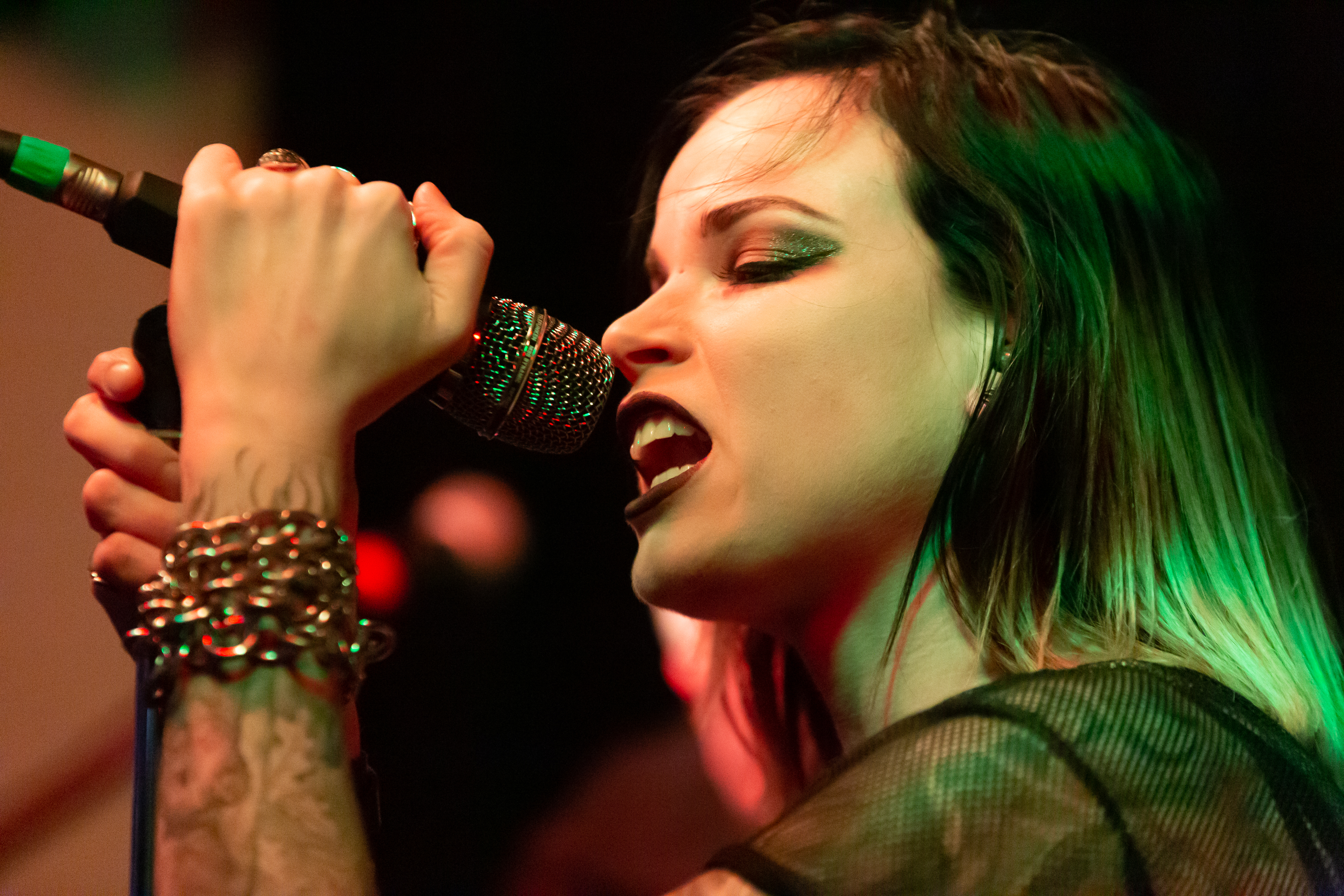
Shakey Sue at a concert in Erfurt (2018)

== Members ==
=== Current members ===
- Shakey Sue (Zsuzsa Radnóti) - vocals (2009-present)
- József Takács - guitar (2018-present)
- Gábor Domján - electric bass (2015-present)
- Béla Budai - drums (2016-present)

=== Former members ===
- Freaky Tiki - guitar (2009-2014)
- Tamás Bánhegyi - guitar (2015-2018)
- Zsolt Weinhandl - double bass (2009-2010)
- Kevin Crime (Balázs Mácsik) - double bass (2010-2014)
- Gábor Szövetes - drums (2009-2010)
- Vilmos Mucsi - drums (2010-2011)
- Péter Vincze - drums (2011-2012)
- Sick Rick (Richárd Szanics) - drums (2012-2015)
- Ádám Szumper - drums (2015-2016)

== Discography ==
=== Studio albums ===
- 2010: Hell, Sweet Hell
- 2012: Circus of Shame
- 2016: Astoria
- 2020: God on the Run
- 2023: Pitch Black Sunset

=== Compilations ===
- 2011: Psychomania Magazine,
- 2011: Big Five Magazine #6
- 2012: Gothic Compilation Part LVI,
- 2012: We Are Rockers: Godless Wicked Creeps Tribute Album, Longneck Records
- 2013: Dynamite Vol. 35 (supplement to the Dynamite magazine Vol. 80, 1/2013)
- 2013: Roots! Riot! Rumble!, Wolverine Records
- 2013: Punkabilly Shakes The World Vol. 2, Rude Runner Records
- 2014: Punkabilly Shakes The World Vol.3, Rude Runner Records
- 2014: Don't Mess With The Girls, Wolverine Records
- 2017: Saving Souls With Rock'n Roll, Wolverine Records

=== Music videos ===
- 2011: Boogieman
- 2013: Godless Girl's Fun
- 2016: Rope
- 2017: Burn The Horizon
- 2017: I'm Away
