= Satan Panonski =

Croatian singer

- Also known as: Kečer II.
- Born: Ivica Čuljak; 4 June 1960; Cerić, PR Croatia, FPR Yugoslavia
- Origin: Vinkovci, Croatia
- Died: 27 January 1992 (aged 31) Vinkovci, Croatia
- Genres: Punk; shock rock
- Occupations: Musician, poet, singer, songwriter, painter
- Years active: Early 1980s–1992

Ivica Čuljak (4 June 1960 – 27 January 1992), better known as Satan Panonski, was a Croatian punk musician, poet, artist and freak performer.

== Early life and career ==
Čuljak was born on 4 June 1960 in Cerić, near Vinkovci. In 1977, he first appeared in the Vinkovci punk scene as Kečer II. In 1978, Čuljak moved to Hamburg, where he claimed to have had his "punk communion". By then, Čuljak already had problems with the law; he spent three months in a correctional facility as punishment for avoiding mandatory military service. In 1980, Čuljak became a singer for the alternative punk band Pogreb X, enjoying minor success with the song "Trpi, kurvo" ("Suffer, Whore").

While performing, Čuljak would engage in gruesome acts of self-harm (which he labeled as "autodestruction") by cutting, smashing bottles on his head, and stabbing himself with safety pins. He justified his acts as a form of catharsis, to liberate the audience from "barricades put on by education and other brainwashing tortures". His acts of self-harm were also described as partially influenced by the body art of Marina Abramović. On 29 November 1981 (Yugoslavia's Republic Day), following a violent altercation at a Meri Cetinić concert, Čuljak stabbed a man 15 times, arguing that the man had previously molested his brother. Čuljak defended himself on the count of self-defence. He was sentenced to 12 years in prison and was expected to serve his sentence at the notorious Goli Otok, but ended up in Popovača prison hospital. He would spend nine years in Popovača, where he was diagnosed with borderline personality disorder. The murder would leave a lasting effect on Čuljak.

Following his release in 1989, Čuljak released two albums — Ljuljajmo ljubljeni ljubičasti ljulj ("Let's Swing the Beloved Purple Ryegrass" (Note: This is intended as a tongue twister.)) and Nuklearne olimpijske igre ("Nuclear Olympic Games") — and a book — Mentalni ranjenik ("The Mentally Wounded Man"). He then adopted the alter ego Satan Panonski ("Satan of Pannonia"), an alias allegedly based on a comment from a passer-by. Čuljak's bizarre performances continued. During his concert at KSET, he cut himself heavily while giving a tirade against "punkers with nationalities".

In 1991, Čuljak joined the Croatian Army in the Croatian War of Independence. During an interview with Globus in November 1991, which took place during the war, he admitted to killing prisoners of war. Čuljak subsequently revoked the statements and argued that he was "supporting Croatians in the process of liberation". His musical direction changed – Čuljak's last album, Kako je panker branio Hrvatsku ("How a Punk Was Defending Croatia") openly discusses killing Serbs and promotes the use of violence, an attitude which Čuljak had previously opposed. Some fans criticized the change of Čuljak's musical direction, attributing it to his alcohol or drug addiction.

Čuljak died in 1992 while still a Croatian soldier during the War of Independence. The cause of his death is unknown. It was rumored that he died after slipping and accidentally discharging the gun he was carrying. This was confirmed by Vlado Čuljak, Čuljak's brother.

== Legacy ==
Čuljak had an influence on Goran Bare, who called him a "Satan, but a deeply unhappy man". Zdenko Franjić, the owner of the record label Slušaj najglasnije!, on which most of Čuljak's work has been released, referred to Čuljak as a "renaissance artist".

Čuljak was the subject of a 33-minute documentary film, the graduate thesis of Serbian director Milorad Milinković. Named Satan Panonski and filmed in 1990, it is the only film about Čuljak made during his lifetime. It portrays his performance in Belgrade, at the Studentski kulturni centar and on air with Fleka on Radio B92. Ivan Glišić wrote about Čuljak's life in his book Čizme slobode.

== Discography ==
- Ljuljajmo ljubljeni ljubičasti ljulj (1989)
- Nuklearne olimpijske igre (1990)
- Kako je panker branio Hrvatsku (1992)

== Bibliography ==
- Mentalni ranjenik (1990)
- Prijatelj (2004)
- Zvali su me Satan Panonski (2019)

== See also ==
- GG Allin
