= KBO! =

Serbian punk rock band

- KBO! performing live at the 2009 Nisomnia festival

Background information
- Origin: Kragujevac, Serbia
- Genres: Punk rock, hardcore punk
- Years active: 1982 – present
- Labels: KBO! Records, Wipe Out! Records, Start Today Records, Onkra
- Members: Ivan Ivezić; Slobodan Vujić; Saša Vujić
- Past members: Milorad Mišić; Rajko Todosavljević; Aleksandar Vojinović
- Website: Official website

KBO! is a Serbian punk rock band from Kragujevac, Serbia. They are one of the first hardcore punk acts on the former Yugoslav punk scene. Since the very beginning, the band accepted the DIY ethic by forming their own record label KBO! Records, through which they have released all their official releases. The band have toured across several European countries including Hungary, Austria, Greece, Belgium and Netherlands and shared the stage with acts such as Gorilla Biscuits and Babes in Toyland. They released several studio and live albums, some of them for foreign record labels and were included in numerous international punk compilations featuring eminent bands.

== History ==
=== 1980s ===
The band was formed in January 1982 by 17-year-old high school friends, guitarists Saša Vujić "Vuja", Aleksandar Vojinović "Aca", bassist Milorad Mišić "Miša" and drummer Rajko Todosavljević, becoming the first punk rock band in Kragujevac. Getting the name by an onomatopoeic sound "kvo" made by a frog in a cartoon, written in Cyrillic, the band name is often misspelled. The band had their first recordings released by English record labels on various artists compilations International Brigade, released in 1984, and Liberate, released in 1985. They also performed at local festivals, until the band members went to serve the army.

On their return, in 1986, the band lineup changed as Mišić and Todosavljević left the band, Saša Vujić switched to vocals and his brother, Slobodan Vujić "Boban", joining the band as the new drummer. The new lineup started recording demos, releasing them independently through their own independent record label KBO! Records, and so the 1986 Tama (Darkness), 1987 Nove obrade starih stvari (New Covers of Older Stuff), 1988 !OBK, and 1989 Moja sloboda (My Freedom), gave the band the opportunity to overreach local prominence. It is partially due to this fact that the band got the opportunity to perform in Budapest, Hungary, in March 1988, recording the show and releasing it as Live in Budapest. On May of the following year, the band performed in Thessaloniki, Greece, and having performed four times in Hungary, in October, the band went to Vienna, Austria, performing as an opening act for Emils and Gorilla Biscuits.

=== 1990s ===
The band's debut album, Forever Punk, recorded at the Belgrade O studio for only four hours, was released by the Greek record label Wipe Out Records in 1991, and the following album, Pozovi 93 (Call 93) was released by the Novi Sad record label Start Today Records in 1992. The band promoted the materials on tours of Yugoslavia, Hungary and Austria, and during the summer of 1991, the band toured Belgium and Netherlands. During 1992, the band performed in Skopje, Republic of Macedonia and prepared new material released on the CD Za jedan korak (For a Single Step) by the French record label Onkra from Toulouse in 1992. The band also performed at Ilirska Bistrica and Koper, Slovenia. In 1993, the band's song "Ubijte me" ("Kill Me") appeared on the various artists compilation The Dignity Of Human Being Is Vulnerable, released in Netherlands. In 1995, the band's song "IdI+odlazi" ("Go+leave") appeared on the anti-war compilation Mi za mir (We for Peace). The band's fourth official album, Svetlo ludila (The Light of Craziness), prepared for about two years, was released by their own record label in 1997, and featured cover versions of Beethoven's "Ode to Joy" and "Grk" ("Greek") by Mikis Theodorakis.

In October 1996, the band performed in KST in Belgrade and the cover versions of UK Subs' "Organized Crime", Alphaville's "Forever Young", renamed to "Forever Punk" and Abrasive Wheels' "When the Punks Go Marching In", performed at the concert, appeared on the various artists compilation Punk You All, released in 1998. In December 1996, the band performed at the TV Politika Paket Aranžman TV show fifth anniversary, and the live versions of "Ubijte me", "Samoća" ("Solitude") and "Lopovi" ("Thieves") appeared on the various artists compilation Svi protiv svih (Everybody against everyone) in 1998. The band, with Drama and Propaganda 117, appeared on the Goran Matić Život za sebe (Life on Its Own) movie soundtrack, with the songs "Balkanska rapsodija" ("The Balkans Rhapsody"), "Ludilo" ("Madness") and "Pada noć" ("The Night is Falling") and rereleased on CD the first two studio albums through KBO! Records.

=== 2000s ===
The band recorded a cover album (Ne) Menjajte stanicu ((Don't) Change the Station), released in 2001, featuring cover versions of ABBA, Električni Orgazam, Pet Shop Boys, Mike Oldfield, Orchestral Manoeuvres in the Dark, Billy Idol, Black and Prince songs. The band also appeared on the Know Your Rights various artists compilation with the songs "Zgubidan" ("Absent") and "What Can I Say", released by NGO Millennium in 2001.

In 2002, the band appeared on the Ringeraja movie soundtrack with the cover of the Indexi single "Bacila je sve niz rijeku" ("She has Thrown away Everything down the River"), featuring Zvoncekova Bilježnica member Toza Rabassa on guest vocals, for which a promotional video was also recorded. The band also released the studio album Drugarska stvar (A Friendly Matter), which featured more politically themed songs. This was the last release to feature Aleksandar Vojinović who left the band in 2005, being replaced by Thimble member Ivan Ivezić "Iveza". The new lineup recorded the new studio album in 2008 with the work title Prosta proza (Simple Prose), the album was mixed and post-produced during the following year.

=== 2010s ===
In October 2010, it was announced that during the following month the band would release the seventh studio and twelfth official band release Prosta proza, featuring the single "Tačka" ("Full Stop"), previously released on the Internet for streaming and digital download as the first single The material to be released, featuring the tracks written since 1996, consists of thirteen out of thirty six new songs the band have so far recorded.

In the autumn of 2014, the band participated in a tribute album to Novembar, entitled Tako mlad i tako čist (So Young and So Clean), with a cover of Novembar song "Blues južne pruge" ("Southern Railroad Blues").

== Discography ==
=== Official demo recordings ===
Title	Released
Tama	1986
Nove obrade starih stvari	1987
!OBK	1988
Live in Budapest	1988
Moja sloboda	1989

=== Studio albums ===
Title	Released
Forever punk	1989
Pozovi 93	1990
Za jedan korak	1992
Svetlo ludila	1997
Drugarska stvar	2002
Prosta proza	2017

=== Cover albums ===
Title	Released
(Ne) Menjajte stanicu	2001

=== Singles ===
Title	Released
"Jebeni život"	1996
"Instrumental" / "Ultranova" / "Ringišpil"	1989
"Forever punk"	1990
"Ubijte me"	1993
"Forever punk"	1993
"Idi+odlazi"	1995
"Nikad"	1996
"Ubite me" / "Samoća" / "Lopovi"	1998
"Organized Crime" / "Forever punk" / "When The Punks Go Marching In"	1998
"Balkanska rapsodija" / "Ludilo" / "Pada noć"	1998
"Zgubidan" / "What Can I Say"	2001
