= Novi Punk Val =

Compilation album
- Released: 1981
- Genre: Punk rock, new wave
- Label: ZKP RTLJ

Novi Punk Val (meaning New Punk Wave) is a compilation album of punk rock and new wave music from the SFR Yugoslavia. It covers the period from 1978 till 1980. It was released by ZKP RTLJ in 1981. It includes songs by notable Slovenian and Croatian artists from the former Yugoslav punk rock and new wave scenes including: Pankrti, Paraf, Prljavo kazalište, Termiti and others.

Along with Paket aranžman and Artistička radna akcija compilations which featured artists from Belgrade, Serbia it is considered a symbol of the former Yugoslav punk and new wave era.

== Track listing ==
1. "Anarhist" - Pankrti
2. "Tovar'ši, jest vam ne verjamem" - Pankrti
3. "Lublana je bulana" - Pankrti
4. zd - Prljavo kazalište
5. "Narodna pjesma" - Paraf
6. "Sranje" - Problemi
7. "Grad izobilja" - Problemi
8. "Možgani na asfaltu" - Berlinski zid
9. "Po cestah mesta" - Berlinski zid
10. "Videti jih" - 92
11. "Kontroliram misli" - 92
12. "To ni balet" - Buldogi
13. "Vjeran pas" - Termiti
14. "Mama, s razlogom se brineš" - Termiti
15. "Vremenska progonoza" - Termiti

== See also ==
- Paket aranžman
- Artistička radna akcija
- Svi marš na ples!
- Vrući dani i vrele noći
- Punk rock in Yugoslavia
- New wave music in Yugoslavia
