= Pankrti =

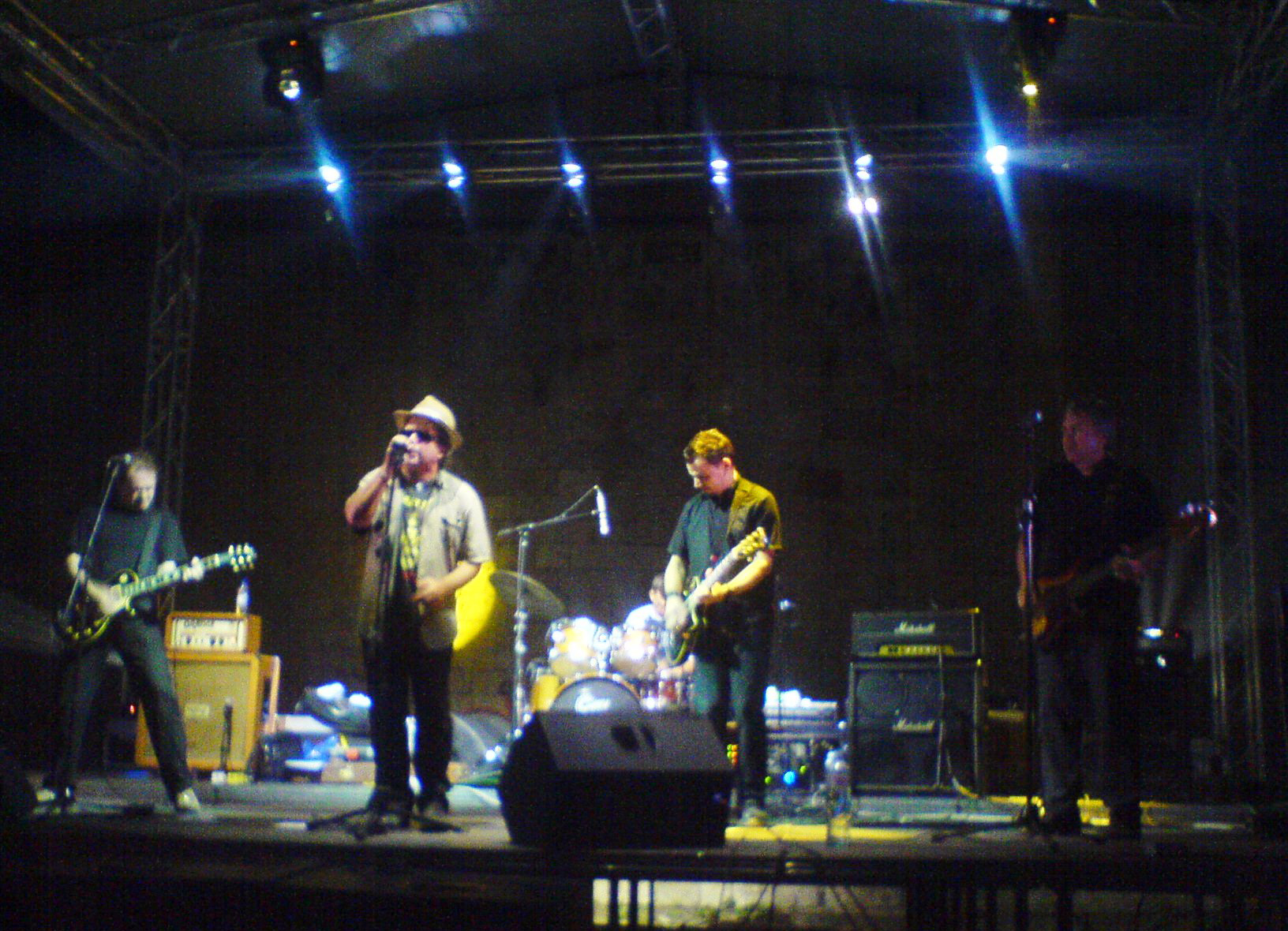
- Pankrti performing at the 2009 Nisomnia festival.

Background information
- Origin: Ljubljana, SR Slovenia, Yugoslavia
- Genres: Punk rock
- Years active: 1977–1987, 2007–present

Pankrti ([paŋkərti], lit. The Bastards) are a Slovenian rock band formed in Ljubljana in 1977. They're most known for provocative and political songs in the context of Yugoslav music. They billed themselves as The First Punk Band Behind The Iron Curtain (one of their songs was titled, Behind the iron curtain old broads pull red beet). They are one of the most important former Yugoslav punk groups and one of the first punk rock bands ever formed in a communist country.

== Biography ==
Gregor Tomc and Peter Lovšin, two young men from the Ljubljana suburb of Kodeljevo, came up with the idea of forming a band in 1977. From the start, the band was heavily influenced by the UK punk scene. Tomc and Lovšin were the primary songwriters. Lovšin was the lead singer in the band, while Tomc came up with the band name and was the band's manager.

The band started playing in the fall of 1977, practicing in the basement of Kodeljevo's music school, and held their first concert at Moste General middle School. Initially, they played covers of established punk bands, including the Sex Pistols, The Clash and New York Dolls. Some of the first original songs by the band that became popular were: "Za železno zaveso" (Behind the Iron Curtain), "Anarhist" (Anarchist), and "Lublana je bulana" (Ljubljana is Sick). They were included in the Novi Punk Val compilation album. They released their debut studio album "Dolgcajt" (Boredom) in 1980 and gained the status of a cult band all over former Yugoslavia.

Their second studio album “Državni ljubimci” (State Lovers) was highly acclaimed by the public and gained an award for best Yugoslav album of the year.

In 1984, they released their third studio album, Rdeči album (Red Album). The title is a pun on The Beatles' White Album, with the colour red used as a symbol of communism. The album featured a cover version of the famous Italian communist revolutionary song Bandiera Rossa (Red Flag), which is one of their most famous tracks.

The last Album was Sexpok (1987, ZKP RTVLJ) produced by Tomo in der Muhlen at SIM studio, Zagreb.

One of their last concerts was in Tivoli Hall in Ljubljana in 1987, named Zadnji pogo (The Last Pogo Dance).

In 1996, the group temporarily reunited to perform as a support act for the Sex Pistols concert in Ljubljana during their Filthy Lucre Tour. In 2003, Pankrti were included in the 2003 Yugonostalgic Croatian rockumentary Sretno dijete, which deals with the former Yugoslav punk and new wave scene of the late 1970s and early 1980s.

== Reunion ==
On December 1st, 2007, the band's founding members, Gregor Tomc and Peter Lovšin, who is now a solo artist backed by the band Španski borci (Spanish Fighters, referring to Yugoslavs who fought for the Republicans the Spanish Civil War), announced Pankrti's reunion concert in the Hall Tivoli . The reunion was announced as a celebration of their 30th anniversary. The concert in which they returned immediately sold out. This show was followed by performances in Serbia and Croatia. These events coincided with the 2007 Sex Pistols reunion for the 30th anniversary of Never Mind The Bollocks.

Pankrti also played in 2017 at their 40th anniversary in sold-out Arena Stožice where the guest Glen Matlock. The venue was opened by all-women hard rock/heavy metal band Hellcats.

== Popular references ==
- A movie was made about their first album Dolgcajt (Boredom).
- Another movie named for one of their greatest songs "Totalna revolucija" (Total Revolution), examined the band's role in the appearance of punk-rock in socialist Slovenia.
- In the Croatian-produced movie Sretno dijete (Fortunate Child) they were also portrayed as having played a very important role as the initiators of a new music scene in Yugoslavia.
- An exhibition of their photos was held at the Modern Culture Museum in Slovenia.
- The rock band Azra mentions Pankrti in its song "Balkan":

Brijem bradu, brkove, da ličim na Pankrte
Translation: I shave my beard, moustache to resemble Pankrti (regarding Azra's frontman Johnny Štulić's transition from hippie to new wave).

- In the Slovenian film Outsider, some of the soundtrack is original Pankrti music and most of the characters were named after those from Pankrti songs.
- The Slovenian punk band Racija recorded a song entitled "To ni bla Metka" (That Was Not Metka), apparently parodying Pankrti's song "Metka". This Pankrti song was included in the Yugoslav new wave-related movie Dečko koji obećava in the scene in the student campus restaurant.
- The legendary BBC Radio DJ John Peel introduced them to a wider audience in Great Britain.
- NME wrote a few articles about them.

== Members ==
- Peter Lovšin (songwriter/singer)
- Gregor Tomc (songwriter/manager)
- Bogo Pretnar (guitar)
- Dušan Žiberna (guitar)
- Marc Kavaš (guitar)
- Boris Kramberger (bass)
- Slavc Colnarič (drums)

== Discography ==
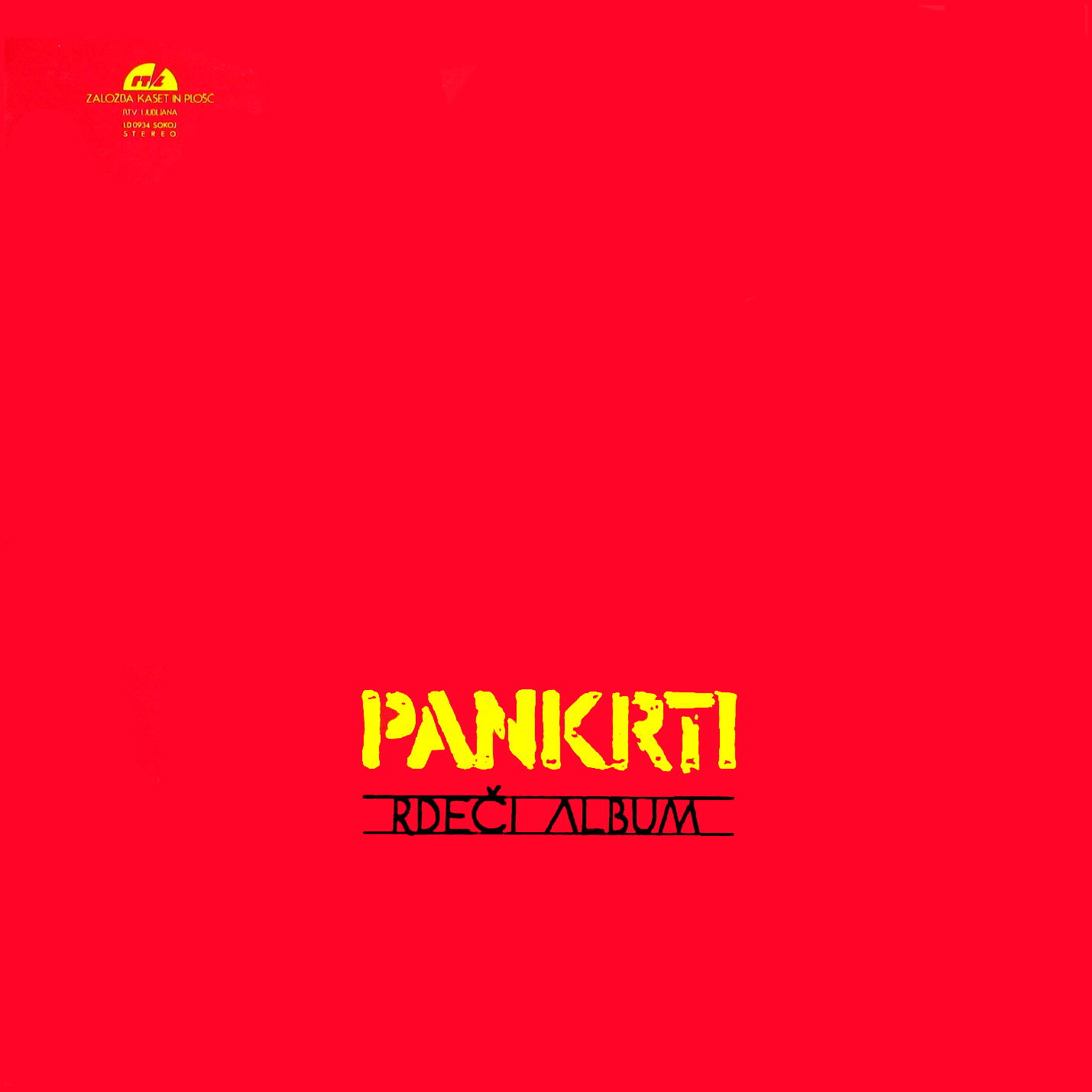
Rdeči album (1984)

- "Lublana je bulana" (1978, ŠKUC)
- "Dolgcajt" (1980, ZKP RTLJ)
- "Novi Punk Val" (1981)
- "Namesto tebe" (1981, ZKP RTLJ)
- "Državni ljubimci" (1982, ZKP RTLJ)
- "Svoboda" (1982, ZKP RTLJ)
- "Rdeči" (1984, ZKP RTLJ)
- "Pesmi sprave" (1985, ZKP RTLJ)
- "Slovan" (1985, Slovan)
- "Sexpok" (1987, ZKP RTVLJ)

== See also ==
- Punk rock in Yugoslavia
