= Paraf =

Croatian punk rock/post-punk band

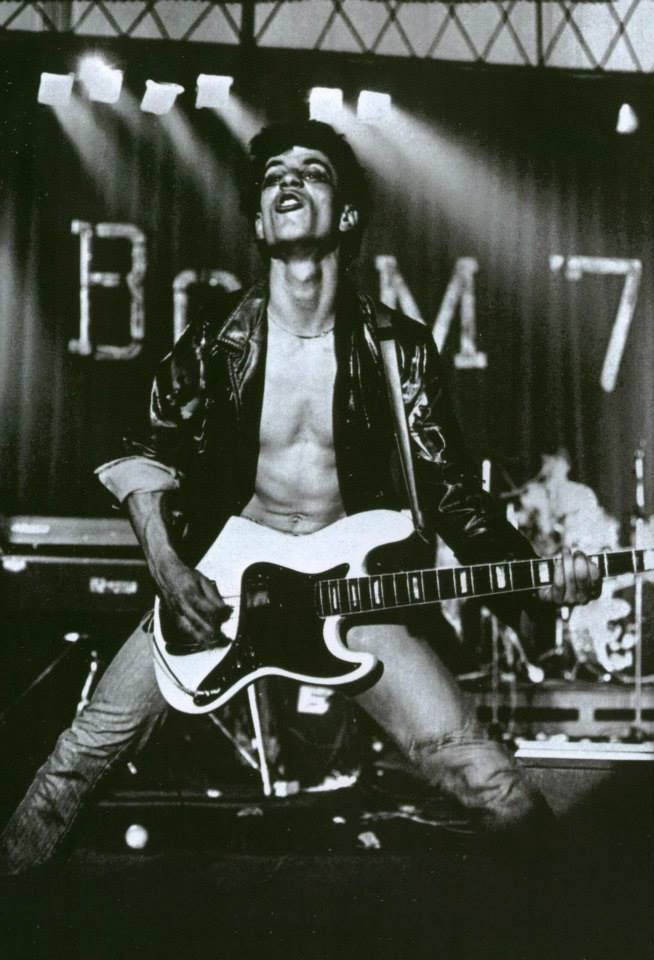
- Paraf's bassist Zdravko Čabrijan at the 1978 BOOM Festival in Novi Sad, Serbia. Photo by Dražen Kalenić.

Background information
- Also known as: Papak
- Origin: Rijeka, Croatia, Yugoslavia
- Genres: Punk rock, new wave (early period); Post-punk, gothic rock (later period)
- Years active: 1976–1986; Reunions: 1994, 2003, 2008
- Labels: ZKP RTLJ, Helidon
- Past members: Valter Kocijančić; Zdravko Čabrijan; Dušan Ladavac; Mladen Vičić; Pavica Mijatović; Raoul Varljen; Robert Tičić; Klaudio Žic; Goran Lisica

Paraf was a punk rock and later post-punk band from Rijeka, Croatia, known as one of the pioneers of punk rock in the SFR Yugoslavia.

== History ==
=== Punk rock years (1976–1980) ===
Following the expansion of punk rock in Europe, teenagers Valter Kocijančić (guitar, vocals), Zdravko Čabrijan (bass) and Dušan Ladavac "Pjer" (drums) formed Paraf in 1976. They played their first gig at Belvedere in Rijeka on December 31, 1976. The band's early live appearances were at Rijeka high-school parties along with the bands of similar musical orientation, Termiti, Protest and Lom. During the late 1978, the band started performing frequently, even outside Rijeka. They played in Ljubljana, Belgrade, Zagreb. The band also performed at the Novi Sad BOOM festival, as well as an opening act for The Ruts concert in Zagreb. In 1979, they released their debut single "Rijeka", a cover version of the Ramones song "Chinese Rocks", but Kocijančić signed as the song author in order to test the Yugoslav critics of the time. Despite the intention, it was the Džuboks magazine journalist Petar Luković who recognized that the song was a cover version. The band also appeared on the various artists compilation album Novi punk val 78-80, released by ZKP RTLJ in 1980, with the song "Narodna pjesma" ("Folk Song").

After several delays, the band debut album A dan je tako lijepo počeo... (And The Day Started Out So Nicely...) was released by ZKP RTLJ in the Spring of 1980. Due to provocative lyrics, the album was classified as kitsch product, and thus liable to additional taxation, despite subsequent changes to some of the lyrics as well as the selection of a different album cover. In line with the punk rock ideology, the band addressed several topics which were at the time new to the Yugoslav rock: the songs featured ironic usages of communist slogans, mocked, at the time, one of the most popular bands, Bijelo Dugme, in the song "Pritanga i vaza", insulting the police in the censored version of "Narodna pjesma", and dealt with social themes typical for a port city. The album was produced by the band's close associate Goran Lisica "Fox", assisted by Igor Vidmar.

After the album release Valter Kocijančić left the band, later joining the band Istočni Izlaz, until quitting his musical career and becoming a teacher, which is also his current occupation. He was replaced by a female vocalist Pavica Mijatović, under the pseudonym Vim Cola, and the former Zadnji guitarist Klaudio Žic. The latter soon left, while two new members - guitarist Mladen Vičić "Riči" and keyboard player Raul Varlen - joined the band. With the arrival of the new members, the band also changed their musical style, moving towards post-punk, influenced by British bands such as Gang of Four and Wire.

=== Post-punk years (1980–1986) ===
The new musical orientation was presented to the wider audience on the second synth-laden studio album "Izleti" ("Excursions"), featuring songs "Pobuna bubuljica" ("Acne Uprising"), "Nestašni đački izleti" ("Naughty School Excursions"), "Javna kupatila" ("Public Bathrooms") and "Federico u bačvi" ("Federico in a Barrel"), the latter being inspired by the Federico Fellini film Casanova. The album also featured their classic cold-wave single "Tužne uši" ("Sad ears") with the memorable chant "Ležim na leđima, plačem za tobom, a suze mi teku u uši" ("I am lying on my back crying for you and tears are flowing into my ears").

Guitarist Vičić left the band after a series of promotional concerts and was replaced by a former Termiti (Termites) member Robert Tičić. The new lineup started working on the third studio album. However, before the album was mixed, the twenty-two-year-old Tičić suffered a fatal brain hemorrhage. His replacement was former Konjak guitarist Mladen Ilić, later the founder of the band Psi (Dogs).

Their third album Zastave (Flags), released in 1984, was produced by the band themselves with Borghesia member Aldo Ivančić. Inspired by Miroslav Krleža's multi-volume novel of the same name, the album featured lyrical themes related to the recent European political history. Most of the album featured somewhat obscure thematic references and occasionally absurd lyrics set to sparse, post-punk-influenced melodies such as the Gang of Four-like "Kad se oglasi" ("When the [Trumpet] Sounds") or Wire-influenced "Zastave". In other songs, such as the ethereal "Oj ponose moj" ("Oh, my Pride") and the bizarre collage "Zlatno Doba" ("Golden Age"), Paraf explored interesting and fresh approaches to both songwriting and production. Perhaps unsurprisingly, the album was largely ignored by the mainstream audiences.

Paraf eventually disbanded in 1986. Pavica Mijatović and Zdravko Čabrijan got married, moved to island Krk and started a tourist business. Drummer Dušan Ladavac joined Let 2 but left the band before it evolved into long-lived and influential alternative rock-act Let 3.

=== Reunions ===
The original Paraf lineup reunited in 1994 in order to perform at the Ri-Rock festival, the third Fiju Briju festival, as well as to perform several solo concerts. In 1996, Kocijančić performed the song "Rijeka" with the ad hoc group Blagdan Band, and the recording of the song appeared on the live album Pallach's not dead. The original lineup reunited again on December 13, 2003, and the recordings of the songs "Rijeka" and "Hit tema" ("Hit theme") from the performance were released on the various artists live album 25. Ri-Rock, released by Dallas Records in 2004. Four years later, in 2008, the band reunited in both the punk rock and post-punk lineups at the promotion of the Riječki Novi Val box set.

== Unreleased material ==
"Goli Otok" ("The Barren Island") was a rather provocative and highly controversial song about the maximum-security, top secret prison and labor camp on the inhospitable island near Rijeka (where, aside from common criminals, the authorities also kept some of the political prisoners well into the 1970s), that was officially released in 2019.

Another suppressed song from the period was "Narodna pjesma" which featured censored lyrics on the debut album, but the original version appeared on the Novi punk val 78-80 compilation album.

== Discography ==
=== Studio albums ===
- A dan je tako lijepo počeo... (1980)
- Izleti (1982)
- Zastave (1984)

=== Singles ===
- "Rijeka" (1979)
- "Fini dečko" (1981)

=== Other appearances ===
- Novi punk val 78-80 (1980)

== Sources ==
- PARAF: riječki punkeri konačno dobili internet-stranicu (in Croatian)
- Paraf: Priča o bendu koji je kod nas pokrenuo punk revoluciju (in Croatian)
