= VIS Simboli =

Fictional band in the Yugoslavian film Strangler vs. Strangler

- Origin: Belgrade, Serbia, Yugoslavia
- Genres: Rock
- Years active: mid-1980s
- Members: Spiridon Kopicl (Srđan Šaper)

VIS Simboli are a fictional band from the Yugoslavian film Strangler vs. Strangler.

== Fictional history ==
The band was formed by Spiridon Kopicl (played by Srđan Šaper, at the time of the film recording member of the band Idoli, which was also known as VIS Idoli) and recorded only one song, "Bejbi, bejbi", inspired by the experience of Kopicl after seeing a television report on a victim of the Belgrade Strangler. Initially, the song only featured the lyrics "Bejbi, bejbi, hoću da te davim" ("Baby, baby, I want to strangle you") repeated for several times. However, encouraged by the previous experience with the Belgrade Strangler, Kopicl tried to live the role of the strangler, moving around Belgrade streets and eventually expanding the song lyrics.

"Beogradski davitelj" became a nationwide hit and was broadcast on the popular music radio show host by Sofija Mačkić (Sonja Savić). Kopicl had a live radio interview on the show and announced the date of the first live appearance of the band. VIS Simboli had their first show on a Friday the 13th. During the sold-out concert, Pera Mitić (Taško Načić), the Belgrade Strangler, who stated that the song was his favorite, killed the police undercover agent Rodoljub Jovanović (Branislav Zeremski). A review of the concert appeared on the Mozaik kulture TV show hosted by Sofija and the song was reviewed extremely negative.

After the band disbanded, Kopicl became a famous composer and conductor and his symphony inspired by the Strangler brought him international fame.

== Discography ==
- "Bejbi, bejbi" (single)

== Legacy ==
The song "Bejbi, bejbi" was covered by many artists. In 1993, a cover version of the song, featuring Dža ili Bu frontman Nebojša Simeunović "Sabljar" and BAAL frontman Andrej Aćin on vocals, was recorded for the opening titles of the radio show Paket aranžman. Serbian britpop band Kristali covered the song on the various artists cover album Korak napred 2 koraka nazad (A Step Formward 2 Steps Backwards), released in 1999. Serbian punk rock band Čovek Bez Sluha covered "Bejbi, bejbi" on their 1999 album Sećanje na zadnjeg klovna (In Memory of the Last Clown). Serbian hard rock/heavy metal band Trigger covered the song on their 2012 cover album EX.

== See also ==
- Davitelj protiv davitelja
- Idoli
