= Ex (Trigger album) =

EX

Studio album by Trigger
- Released: May 10, 2011 (Part 1); May 23, 2012 (Part 2); November 23, 2012 (Part 3)
- Recorded: Studio Dž; 2010 – 2012
- Genre: Hard rock Heavy metal Alternative metal
- Length: 33:34
- Label: Self-released

Trigger chronology
Metropolis Live (2009)	EX (2011)

Professional ratings
Review scores
Source	Rating
Serbian-metal.org	10/10 stars

EX is a cover and the second studio album by the Serbian hard rock/heavy metal band Trigger. The album, featuring covers of songs by acts from the former Yugoslav rock scene (the album title refers to the phrase "ex yu rock" commonly used in the successor states), was released in three parts, all three available for free download from the band's official website.

== Concept and release ==
The album mainly features songs by the acts from the former Yugoslav new wave scene, but also from Jakarta and Beograd, who were not a part of the scene, but were closely associated with it. The album also features a cover of Haustor song "Ena", from the band's post-new wave phase, as well as a cover of the song "Bejbi, bejbi" by the fictional band VIS Simboli from the 1985 film Strangler vs. Strangler. The band's leader, Dušan Svilokos Đurić stated in an interview that the band "didn't want to record an album with 'pure' new wave songs, but rather choose the ones that represent the spirit of the time".

The album was released in three parts. The first part, featuring the first three tracks, was released in May 2011, the second, featuring the following three tracks, was released in May 2012, and the third part, featuring the last two tracks from the album, was released in November 2012. All three parts of the album were available for free download from the band's official website.

Đurić stated that several more covers were recorded, but were not released on the album because the band did not get permission from the songs' authors to do so.

== Track listing ==
No.	Title	Writer(s)	Original artist	Length
1.	"Ne veruj u idole" ("Do Not Believe in Idols")	Kiki Lesendrić	Piloti	3:30
2.	"Ena"	Darko Rundek	Haustor	4:13
3.	"Kurvini sinovi" ("Sons of Whores")	Branimir Štulić	Azra	4:23
4.	"Trenutni lek" ("Momentary Remedy")	Nenad Stamatović, Marina Tucaković	Bulevar	5:03
5.	"Ogledalo" ("Mirror")	Bojan Banović, Goran Sinadinović, Vojin Jovanović	Petar i Zli Vuci	4:56
6.	"Bejbi, bejbi" ("Baby, Baby")	Srđan Šaper	VIS Simboli	3:38
7.	"Spiritus"	Jane Parđovski, Igor Popović	Jakarta	4:27
8.	"Opasne igre" ("Dangerous Games")	Dejan Stanisavljević	Beograd	3:24
Total length:				33:34

== Personnel ==
- Milena Branković - vocals
- Dušan Svilokos Đurić – guitar, arrangements, recording, production
- Petar Popović - bass guitar
- Marko Antnonić - keyboards
- Zoran Jović - drums

=== Additional personnel ===
- Vladimir Petrović - design
- Sibin Arsenijević - photography
