= Petar i Zli Vuci =

Yugoslav band

- Petar i Zli Vuci: Vojin Jovanović (left) and Saša Lukić (right)

Background information
- Also known as: PiZV
- Origin: Belgrade, SR Serbia, SFR Yugoslavia
- Genres: New wave, punk rock, ska, reggae
- Years active: 1980 – 1983
- Labels: Jugoton, PGP-RTB
- Past members: Bojan Banović; Dragoljub Ljubičić; Goran Sinadinović; Milan Popović; Relja Obrenović; Saša Lukić; Siniša Nojković; Vojin Jovanović

Petar i Zli Vuci (Serbian Cyrillic: Петар и Зли Вуци; trans. Peter and the Wolf Pack) were a former Yugoslav new wave/ska band from Belgrade, notable as the participant of the Artistička radna akcija project.

== History ==
During the early 1980s, former Hipnotisano Pile vocalist Bojan Banović together with a former Električni Orgazam guitarist Goran Sinadinović founded the band called Petar i Zli Vuci. The idea for the name came from Sinadinović and was inspired by the band-names from the 1960s. Soon after, vocalists Saša Lukić and Milan Popović, guitarist Vojin Jovanović "Voja", bassist Siniša Nojković and drummer Relja Obrenović joined the band. Most of the band members were high school friends from the Eleventh Belgrade High School.

The band got the public's attention by numerous club performances in Belgrade and Zagreb. Ska style and unique live performances provided the band an opportunity to perform and win the Festival Omladia, in May 1981, with the song "Ogledalo" ("Mirror"). The song, with "Ubica" ("Killer") and "Na plaži" ("On the beach") as the B-sides was released on single by Jugoton during the summer of 1981. The single, recorded at the Druga Maca Studio and produced by Enco Lesić, featured guest appearance by a former The End Band member Saša Stojanović "Sax" on saxophone.

"Ogledalo", with the song "Kozaci" ("Cossacks"), also appeared on the Artistička radna akcija various artists compilation, featuring the second generation of new wave and punk rock bands from Belgrade. After the compilation release, Saša Lukić, Milan Popović and Voja Jovanović left the band and Dragoljub Ljubičić "Mićko" (guitar, vocals) became the new band member. The new lineup recorded the single "Moroni" ("Morons"), released on the various artists compilation Ventilator 202 Demo Top 10 by PGP-RTB in April 1983. The band split up during the same year.

In 1994, Komuna released a compilation Yu retrospektiva - Jugoslovenski novi talas (Yu retrospective - Yugoslav New Wave) featuring "Ogledalo", which is the only Petar i Zli Vuci song released on CD.

== Post-breakup ==
Relja Obrenović joined Rambo Amadeus' backing band, and appeared as performer on the album Hoćemo gusle, released in 1989, and in 2007 he appeared as guest on the Partibrejkers studio album Sloboda ili ništa.

Banović worked with Indexovo radio pozorište for four years, finished Architecture studies and got the master's degree in the United States. Sinadinović appeared as guest on the album title track of the Point Blank studio album Južnjačka uteha (Southern Comfort), released in 1991.

Ljubičić was also involved with the Indexovo radio pozorište. In 1993, he appeared in director Želimir Žilnik's semi-documentary film Tito po drugi put među Srbima. From 1985 and onward, he founded and became the director of Tim Talenata (Talents Team) marketing agency. He has since been involved with several productions and radio shows as well as written the book Nacionalni park Srbija (National Park Serbia). He also recorded a solo album Truba... i druge priče (Trumpet... and Other Stories), released by Mascom Records in 2005, on which Banović appeared as the co-author of the song "Kiše" ("Rains").

== Legacy ==
In 1998, the various artists compilation Ventilator 202 vol. 1, featuring the band's song "Moroni", appeared on the 100th place on the 100 greatest Yugoslav popular music albums list, released in the book YU 100: najbolji albumi jugoslovenske rok i pop muzike (YU 100: The Best albums of Yugoslav pop and rock music). In 2006, the B92 list of the 100 Greatest Yugoslav popular music songs, "Ogledalo" was ranked No. 90.

In 2008, the song "Ogledalo" was covered by Serbian punk rock band Novembar on their album 2008 cover album Radulizam In 2011, "Ogledalo" was covered by Serbian hard rock/heavy metal band Trigger for their cover album EX.

The "Ogledalo" lyrics were featured in Petar Janjatović's book Pesme bratstva, detinjstva & potomstva: Antologija ex YU rok poezije 1967 - 2007 (Songs of Brotherhood, Childhood & Offspring: Anthology of Ex YU Rock Poetry 1967 - 2007).

== Discography ==
=== Singles ===
Title	Released
"Ogledalo" / "Ubica" / "Na plaži"	1981

=== Other appearances ===
Title	Album	Released
"Ogledalo" / "Kozaci"	Artistička radna akcija	1981
"Moroni"	Ventilator 202 demo top 10	1983
"Ogledalo"	Yu retrospektiva - Jugoslovenski novi talas	1994

== See also ==
- New wave music in Yugoslavia
