= Kristali =

Serbian pop rock band

Background information
- Origin: Belgrade, Serbia
- Genres: Pop rock; britpop
- Years active: 1993–2025
- Labels: L.V.O. Records, Metropolis Records, PGP-RTS, B92, Multimedia Records
- Past members: Dejan Gvozden; Željko Markuš; Dejan Kostić; Milan Popović; Nenad Potije; Aleksandar Šišić; Bojan Dmitrašinović; Dejan Škopelja; Ratko Ljubičić; Ivan Krstić; Predrag Manov; Marko Orlović; Ernest Džananović; Branko Karapandža

Kristali (Serbian Cyrillic: Кристали; trans. The Crystals) were a Serbian pop rock band formed in Belgrade in 1993. The group gained mainstream popularity in mid-1990s with their britpop-influenced pop rock sound, scoring several hit songs. Having released four studio albums and a live album, the band ended their activity in 2025, following the death of the group's frontman and leader Dejan Gvozden.

== History ==
=== 1990s ===
Prior to the band formation, vocalist and bass guitarist Dejan Gvozden and guitarist Željko Markuš performed blues and rock standards in Belgrade cafes. They started working under the name Kristali in January 1993, after they were joined by drummer Dejan Kostić. Only six months later, the band had their first hit with the single "Dva metra" ("Two Meters"), for which the music video was directed by Milutin Petrović. Soon after, they were joined by bass guitarist Milan Popović, Gvozden continuingas vocalist only. The band was further expanded with the arrival of former Del Arno Band member Nenad Potije on trombone. During the same year, the band had their first song released, with "O kako si lepa" ("Oh, How Beautiful You Are") appearing on the L.V.O. Records various artists compilation Academia vol.1. The live version of the song, recorded at the band's performance in Belgrade club Prostor on 9 February 1994, appeared on the 1995 live various artists compilation Groovanje Vol. 1 (Grooving Vol.1).

The band's debut album Kristali was released by L.V.O. Records in 1994. The album featured guest appearances by Eyesburn frontman Nemanja Kojić on trombone, Borivoje Borac on saxophone, Vladimir Lešić on percussion and Đorđe Vasović on keyboards, with Dža ili Bu member Aleksadar Mitanovski playing the guitar solo on the track "Emili" ("Emily"). The album was produced by Goran Živković "Žika" and Rodoljub Stojanović, and the album cover was designed by renowned photographer Goranka Matić. With songs "Dva metra" ("Two Meters"), "O kako si lepa", "Znam" ("I Know") and "Osmi dan" ("The Eighth Day"), the band promoted pop-structured songs inspired by the current britpop trends in Great Britain.

The band's second studio album, Dolina ljubavi (The Valley of Love), was produced by Igor Borojević and released in April 1977. It featured guest appearances by Block Out member Aleksandar Balać (bass guitar), Aleksandar Tomić (saxophone), and Rambo Amadeus, who played acoustic guitar on the track "Sad se svega sećam" ("Now I Remember Everything"). With the song "Talasi" ("The Waves"), "Novi dan" ("New Day"), and "Hajde, hajde" ("Come On") the band followed the same musical patterns found on their debut. The following year, the band recorded the music for the theatre play Furka (Rush), performed in Belgrade's Boško Buha Theatre, and in 1999, they appeared on the various artists cover album Korak napred 2 koraka nazad (A Step Forward 2 Steps Backwards) with a cover version of the song "Baby, baby", originally performed by the fictional band VIS Simboli in Slobodan Šijan's 1984 film Strangler vs. Strangler.

=== 2000s ===
In 2001, the band released their third studio album, Sve što dolazi (All That Is To Come), featuring new members, bass guitarist Aleksandar Šišić and drummer Bojan Dmitrašinović, whereas Gvozden, beside the vocal duties, also took up playing the rhythm guitar. With all the songs authored by Gvozden and Markuš, including the hits "Ustani, kreni" ("Stand Up, Go"), "Menjam se" ("I am Changing") and "Moje srce" ("My Heart"), the album was produced by Mirko Vukomanović. The following year, the remix of the song "Ustani, kreni" by the electronic band Intruder appeared on Intruder album Collector's Item.

The band celebrated their tenth anniversary with the release of the live album Live @ Studio 6, recorded at PGP RTS Studio 6 by the band's new lineup, featuring Gvozden, Markuš, bassist Dejan Škopelja (formerly of U Škripcu), drummer Ratko Ljubičić and keyboardist Ivan Krstić. During the same year, the band appeared in Srđan Koljević's film The Red Colored Grey Truck, performing the song "Mesto za nas" ("A Place for Us"). In 2006, Gvozden acted in two popular Hello Juice commercials, also providing vocals for a pop punk cover of "Jingle Bells" used in the commercials.

=== 2010s ===
In 2010, the band recorded the song "Drvoseča" ("The Woodcutter"), a cover of the Crveni Koralji version of Tim Hardin's "If I Were a Carpenter", for Srđan Koljević's film The Woman with a Broken Nose. In March 2013, Kristali released their fourth studio album, Samo bluz (Only Blues), in the linuep featuring Gvozden, Predrag Manov (guitar), Marko Orlović (bass guitar) and Ernest Džananović (drums). During the same year, they recorded the song "Proleće" with the children's choir Kolibri for the choir's album Kolibri planeta (Hummingbird Planet).

On 22 February 2014, the band held an unplugged performance at the Parobrod club in Belgrade. The recordings of the songs "Znam", "Talasi" and "Moje srce" appeared on the 2014 various artists live album Parobrod Unplugged, featuring recordings from different unplugged performances held at the club. In June 2014 appeared the band's last release, the single "Divan dan" ("Beautiful Day"), and in October of the same year, they celebrated their 20th anniversary with a concert in Belgrade Youth Center, featuring guest appearances by the band's former members Željko Markuš–who had a year earlier started his new band Pacifik (Pacific)–and Milan Popović.

=== 2020s ===
The band's frontman and the only remaining original member Dejan Gvozden died on 5 October 2025, aged 55, Kristali thus ending their activity.

== Legacy ==
In 2006, the song "Osmi dan" was ranked No. 74 on the B92 Top 100 Domestic Songs list.

In 2021, the band's album Dolina ljubavi was polled 73rd on the list of 100 Best Serbian Albums Since the Breakup of SFR Yugoslavia. The list was published in the book Kako (ni)je propao rokenrol u Srbiji (How Rock 'n' Roll in Serbia (Didn't) Came to an End).

== Discography ==
=== Studio albums ===
- Kristali (1994)
- Dolina ljubavi (1997)
- Sve što dolazi (2001)
- Samo bluz (2013)

=== Live albums ===
- Live @ Studio 6 (2004)

=== Other appearances ===
- "Kako si lepa" (Academia vol. 1; 1993)
- "Kako si lepa" (Groovanje vol. 1; 1995)
- "Baby, baby" (Korak napred 2 koraka nazad; 1999)
