= In the Name of Father and Son =

1999 film

- Directed by: Božidar Nikolić
- Written by: Božidar Nikolić; Željko Mijanović
- Produced by: Bogdan Stojiljković; Maša Nikolić; Milenko Stanković
- Starring: Danilo Stojković; Branimir Popović; Petar Božović; Milutin Karadžić; Boro Stjepanović; Slobodan Marunović
- Music by: Zoran Simjanović; Aleksandar Milić
- Release date: 1999
- Running time: 115 minutes
- Country: FR Yugoslavia
- Language: Serbian

In the Name of Father and Son (Serbian: U ime oca i sina, Serbian Cyrillic: У име оца и сина) is a 1999 film directed by Božidar Nikolić.

== Plot ==
The film is a story of a typical Montenegrin family whose son is no longer the same after returning from war.

In a small provincial town, in the days when the Yugoslav wars began, a young journalist from a local television station writes a fiery article that inflames the already boiling passions among the locals. While the men enthusiastically respond to the mobilization and enroll in the volunteer lists en masse, only the journalist's father, an ordinary man from the people, intends to break the family tradition of glorious warriors and prevent his only son from going to the front. When his anti-war operation succeeds, the dilemma remains whether its cost may have been too high.

== Cast ==
- Danilo Stojković as Mrgud Miletić
- Branimir Popović as Mirko Miletić
- Sonja Jauković as Marica Miletić
- Petar Božović as Živko Lakić
- Milutin Karadžić as Vukota
- Varja Đukić as Journalist
- Boro Stjepanović as Brica
- Ivana Tomičić as Mikača
- Milo Miranović as Spasoje
- Brano Vuković as Savo
- Slobodan Marunović as Professor
- Neda Arnerić as Ceca
- Branimir Brstina as Slavko
