= Čovek Bez Sluha =

Serbian punk rock band

- Čovek Bez Sluha performing in Kragujevac in 2007

Background information
- Also known as: ČBS, ChBS
- Origin: Kragujevac, Serbia
- Genres: Punk rock, pop punk, power pop, post-grunge
- Years active: 1994 – present
- Labels: Češnjak Records, Mettletvica Alien Noise, Millenium Records, ČBS Records, Automatik Records, Long Play
- Members: Milan Radojević; Zoran Lazarević; Vladimir Lazarević
- Past members: Aleksandar Marković; Dejan Ilić; Nemanja Obradović; Radomir Mirković; Željko Maksimović; Mikica Zdravković
- Website: Official myspace

Čovek Bez Sluha (Serbian Cyrillic: Човек Без Слуха; trans. A Tone-deaf Man) is a Serbian punk rock band from Kragujevac.

== History ==
=== 1990s ===
The band was formed in late 1994 by Mikica Zdravković (guitar, bass guitar) and Aleksandar Marković "Coa" (vocals) with Željko Maksimović "Maks" (drums) and Radomir Mirković (vocals). The band was soon joined by the former Van Gogh bassist Dejan Ilić "Cvika". Having performed as an opening act for numerous acts, and changing several lineups including a saxophone introduction, the band got its default lineup: Mirković, Zdravković, Maksimović and guitarist Zoran Lazarević "Laza". The band got the chance to present their work at the Kragujevac local festival Šraf 95, and soon after recorded their first demo entitled Sat (Hour).

The following year the band recorded the song "Problem", a cover version of the Idoli track "Zašto su danas devojke ljute" ("Why are the Girls Angry Today") featuring altered lyrics, which appeared on the various artists compilation KG United. The song also appeared on their debut album Mrzim ovaj grad (I Hate This Town), recorded at the Kragujevac Češnjak studio with the producer Saša Vujić of KBO!, released by Metletvica Alien Noise and Češnjak Records in 1998. During the same year, the band also appeared on the various artists compilation Volim ovaj grad (I Love This Town) with the track "Himna radničkom" ("Radnički Anthem").

In 1999, the band appeared on the festival in Kladij, Bosnia and Herzegovina, organized by SFOR, and won the third place. During the same year, the band released their second album Sećanje na zadnjeg klovna (Memory of the Last Clown), featuring the single "Paranoik" ("Paranoid"). The album, recorded at the Češnjak studio in November 1999, also featured cover versions of the Kim Carnes song "I'll Be Here Where the Heart Is", originally released on her 1983 album Café Racers, and the song "Davitelj" ("The Strangler"), a cover version of the VIS Simboli song "Bejbi, bejbi" ("Baby, Baby") from the movie Strangler vs. Strangler.

=== 2000s ===
On June 21, 2001, the band performed at a festival in Paris with the songs "Umesto osmeha" ("Instead of a Smile"), and the cover of Billy Joel's hit "We Didn't Start the Fire". Six Pack vocalist Milan Radojević appeared as guest on the tracks and the recordings were included on the NGO Millenium various artists compilation Know Your Rights. During the eighth years anniversary performance at Kutija šibica club, the band recorded a biographical documentary on November 16, 2002. At the same time Radojević became the band's official vocalist, as Mirković moved to Switzerland.

In 2003, the band released the single "Dosadan dan" ("A Boring Day"), promoting the upcoming studio album. The new lineup also wrote music for Kragujevac SKC amateur play Ubu Roi and started recording the third studio album Second Hand, released in 2004 by their own ČBS Records, featuring rerecorded versions of "Paranoik" and "Umesto osmeha" and a cover version of the Parni Valjak song "Samo sjećanja" ("Only Memories"), renamed to "Sećanja" ("Memories"). Beside the band, the album was co-produced by Saša Vujić, who also appeared as guest on the track "Jutro ozbiljnih planova" ("A Morning of Serious Plans"), Dobrica Andrić and Leb i Sol keyboardist Nikola Dimuševski.

In 2006, Second Hand was rereleased by Automatik Records. The band also performed at the movie premiere of the We Are Not Angels 3: Rock and roll Strikes Back, fashion week opening at the Intercontinental Hotel in Belgrade, and, in 2007, at the Belgrade Beer Fest. The following year, the band performed at the EXIT festival Fusion stage, and in the meantime started preparing a new album, recorded at the Barba studio with the producer Dejo Vučković.

=== 2010s ===
In June 2011, the band released their fourth studio album Događaj dana (Event of the Day) through Long Play. The album was preceded by the video for the song "Gotovo je" ("It's Over"), which premiered in May on MTV Adria. In Autumn the band went on the promotional tour, which included performances in Serbia, as well as in other former Yugoslav republics, during which they performed as the opening band for Hladno Pivo on their concert in Belgrade Sports Hall.

On November 18, 2012, the band released the song "Ne veruj nikome" ("Trust No One") for free download, in order to celebrate "the band's legal age" (eighteen years of activity). In November 2014, the band released the single "Ti samo misliš da me znaš" ("You only Think that You Know Me").

On December 6, 2014, the band celebrated 20 years of activity with a concert in Belgrade Youth Center. The concert featured guest appearances by the bands Gužva u 16-ercu i Ućuti Pas!, Orthodox Celts frontman Aleksandar Petrović, Goblini guitarists Alen Jovanović and Leonid Pilipović and KBO! and Trula Koalicija guitarist Saša Vujić "Vuja".

== Discography ==
=== Studio albums ===
- Mrzim ovaj grad (1998)
- Sećanje na zadnjeg klovna (1999)
- Second hand (2004)
- Događaj dana (2011)
- Stanimo u gard (2018)

=== Singles ===
- "Dosadan dan" (2003)
- "Ne veruj nikome" (2012)

=== Other appearances ===
- "Problem" (KG United; 1996)
- "Himna Radničkom" (Volim ovaj grad; 1998)
- "Umesto osmeha" / "We Didn't Start the Fire" (Know Your Rights; 2001)

== See also ==
- Punk rock in Yugoslavia
