= Who's Singin' Over There? =

- Yugoslav cinema release film poster, designed by Mirko Ilić
- Serbo-Croatian: Ko to tamo peva
- Directed by: Slobodan Šijan
- Written by: Dušan Kovačević
- Produced by: Milan Zmukić
- Starring: Pavle Vujisić; Dragan Nikolić; Danilo Stojković; Aleksandar Berček; Neda Arnerić; Milivoje Tomić; Taško Načić; Boro Stjepanović; Slavko Štimac; Miodrag Kostić; Nenad Kostić
- Cinematography: Božidar Nikolić
- Edited by: Ljiljana_Lana_Vukobratović
- Music by: Vojislav Kostić
- Production company: Centar Film
- Distributed by: Radio Television Belgrade (Yugoslavia, video); International Home Cinema (USA, all media)
- Release date: 3 October 1980
- Running time: 87 minutes
- Country: Yugoslavia
- Language: Serbo-Croatian
- Budget: DEM180,000

Who's Singin' Over There? (Serbo-Croatian: Ko to tamo peva) is a 1980 Yugoslav film written by Dušan Kovačević and directed by Slobodan Šijan. It is a dark comedy and features an ensemble cast. The film tells a story about a group of passengers traveling by bus to Belgrade in 1941, during the last days of the Kingdom of Yugoslavia, just before its invasion by the Axis.

The film was screened in the Un Certain Regard section at the 1981 Cannes Film Festival. In 1996, the Yugoslav Board of the Academy of Film Art and Science (AFUN) voted this movie the best Serbian movie made in the 1947–1995 period.

== Plot ==
On Saturday, 5 April 1941, one day before the Axis invasion of the Kingdom of Yugoslavia, a colourful group of random passengers on a country road deep in the heart of Serbia board a dilapidated bus, headed for the capital Belgrade. The group includes two Romani musicians, a World War I veteran, a Germanophilic geologist, a budding singer, a sickly looking man, and a hunter with a shotgun. The bus is owned by Krstić Sr., and driven by his impressionable and dim-witted son Miško.

Along the way, they are joined by a priest and a pair of young newlyweds who are on their way to the seaside for their honeymoon, and are faced with numerous difficulties: an army roadblock forcing a detour, a farmer ploughing the road which, he claims, stretches over his land, a flat tire, a funeral, two feuding families, a shaky bridge, Krstić Jr.'s recruitment into the army, and a lost wallet. All these slow the bus down and expose rifts among the travelers.

During the early morning of Sunday, 6 April, amid rumours of war, they finally reach Belgrade only to be caught in the middle of the Luftwaffe raid (Operation Punishment). The only apparent surviving passengers are the two Romani musicians who sing the film's theme song "Za Beograd" before the end.

=== Za Beograd ===
Opening scene

Za Beograd (Note: 'To Belgrade') (also known by its incipit Sviće zora u subotu (Note: 'Dawn breaks on Saturday')) is the signature song of the film, sung by two Romani youths. Written by the film's composer Vojislav Kostić, it has become notable by itself and was frequently covered by other artists.

The film opens with the song sung by the two Roma youths into the camera and it continues throughout the film. The older musician plays accordion, the younger one plays the jaw harp.

== Cast ==
- Pavle Vuisić as The Bus Conductor
- Dragan Nikolić as The Singer
- Danilo Stojković as Brka
- Aleksandar Berček as Miško Krstić
- Neda Arnerić as The Bride
- Mića Tomić as Aleksa Simić
- Taško Načić as The Hunter
- Boro Stjepanović as The Bald Guy
- Slavko Štimac as The Groom
- Miodrag Kostić as Musician 1
- Nenad Kostić as Musician 2
- Bora Todorović as The Mourner
- Slobodan Aligrudić as Lieutenant
- Petar Lupa as The Priest
- Stanojlo Milinković as The Plowman
- Ljubomir Ćipranić as Corporal Rajković
- Milovan Tasić as The Plowman's Son (uncredited)

=== Za Beograd singers ===
The role of the older singer was played by Miodrag "Mića" Kostić (25 years at the time of the filming; born on 27 June 1955, native of Belgrade) and of the younger one by Miodrag's nephew, Nenad Kostić (11 years). Miodrag earned 3 million dinars and Nenad 1.5 million for the roles.

In interviews, Miodrag describes how he got the role. It so happened that he and film director Slobodan Šijan took part in the same military exercise, but in different companies. Miodrag was proposed to do a gig for the soldiers and probably that's what brought Šijan's attention. After that Miodrag got an offer.

When Miodrag was suggested to take a child for a companion, he refused to work with an unfamiliar kid and suggested his nephew, Nenad. Since Nenad could not play jaw harp, he only held it by the mouth and Mića Đorđević recorded the playing in the studio.

Since the film Miodrag remained an accordion player, and Nenad had eventually become a bus driver. Miodrag also played roles of Roma musician in the 1994 TV series Otvorena vrata, in the 2004 comedy film Pljacka Treceg Rajha and some others.

== Production ==
Centar Film, a state-owned production house, wanted to make Dušan Kovačević's script into a movie since 1978.

Reportedly, Goran Paskaljević was their first choice to direct the movie. He was supposed to shoot the Kovačević script as a contemporary-themed 50-minute TV movie whose story takes place in the late 1970s Yugoslavia on a public transport bus with the central character—an old man (played by Mija Aleksić)—headed to pay a visit to his son who's away serving his mandatory Yugoslav People's Army (JNA) service. However, Paskaljević decided to leave the project and shoot the feature film Zemaljski dani teku instead.

The job then went to the 33-year-old Slobodan Šijan who had never shot a feature film up to that point. Šijan described his experience:

When I did my first film I was slightly scared, was it actually going to be funny? Because comedy is straightforward, there is no fooling around with it, if people don't laugh it's a bust.

The movie was made on a budget of US$130,000 with 21 shooting days. The filming began on 4 April 1980 and was finished 26 days later. It was shot almost entirely in Deliblatska Peščara.

The Mercedes-Benz O 3500 bus was chosen by the film's production designer Veljko Despotović based on the description provided by Šijan. It was rented from Jadran Film and painted red for the film. The same vehicle had appeared in earlier Yugoslav films such as Occupation in 26 Pictures (1978) and See You in the Next War (1980). For Occupation in 26 Pictures, the bus had been fitted with a removable roof used to provide natural lighting. It was, however, barely in driving condition, and for interior shots the bus was mostly pushed or towed so as not to strain the engine. The smoke and the presence of live pigs in the cramped interior space made the filming conditions very difficult for the cast and the crew.

The final bombing scene was originally meant to include wild animals from the bombed Belgrade Zoo roaming through the city's downtown, which indeed happened during actual 6 April 1941 Luftwaffe air-raids; in fact, an old newspaper article documenting this bizarre occurrence served as inspiration for the author Dušan Kovačević to include it in the film. However, at the time of movie's filming in April 1980, Tito was gravely ill (he died four days after the filming), which resulted in the extended mourning period that effectively canceled all entertainment activities in the country - including the Italian circus tour that was meant to provide the animals for the scene. Since working with untrained zoo animals was deemed too dangerous, the film-makers reluctantly had to abandon the idea at the time. However, the idea was used in the opening scene of Underground (1995), some 15 years later.

In 2004 the film was turned into a ballet by the National Theatre in Belgrade. The music was again by Vojislav Kostić and the choreography was made by Staša Zurovac.

== Reception and reaction ==
Upon release, the movie received significant public and critical acclaim throughout SFR Yugoslavia and it has since gained a notable cultural status within the Balkans. Various quotes from the film have joined the popular vernacular of the region.

The film earned the special jury award at the 1981 Montréal World Film Festival.

In 1996, members of the Yugoslavian Board of the Academy of Film Art and Science (AFUN) voted this movie as the best Serbian movie made in the 1947–1995 period.

Film critic Fedor Tot compares the song Za Beograd with the Greek chorus: the action stops, the singers sing the next piece of the song that comments on the major events in the surrounding life, then the action continues. Other than that the Roma singers take little part in the action of the film, with the exception of the very end when they are accused of stealing the wallet. Other passengers treat the singers negatively as stereotypical Roma, according to the two most common stereotypes: musicians and thieves. Ironically, the singers were the sole survivors of the bombing among the passengers because they were expelled from the bus.

In 2017, before the gala screening of the digitally restored film, the scene was given to Miodrag and Nenad with their song, which earned the first ovations of the event.

== See also ==
- List of Yugoslav films

== Film reviews ==
- Konstanty Kuzma, Slobodan Šijan’s Who’s Singin’ Over There? (Ko to tamo peva, 1980), East European Film Bulletin, 2012, vol. 19
- Steven Shaviro, "Who Is Singing Over There?", February 22, 2007
