= Piloti (band) =

Rock band from Belgrade, Serbia

- Kiki Lesendrić & Piloti performing in 2009

Background information
- Also known as: Kiki Lesendrić & Piloti
- Origin: Belgrade, Serbia
- Genres: New wave; ska; rock; pop rock; power pop
- Years active: 1980–1997; 1998; 2009–present
- Labels: PGP-RTB, PGP-RTS, Komuna, Bread Ventures Records
- Members: Kiki Lesendrić; Ljubomir Šobotović; Dragan Ivanović; Vlada Migrić; Olga Vulović
- Past members: Dragan Andrić; Goran Bogićević; Nenad Antanasijević; Zoran Obradović; Dejan Grujić; Darko Grujić; Safet Petrovac; Miško Plavi; Bane Lesendrić; Zoran Bavović; Laza Ristovski; Vlada Migrić; Vladimir Negovanović; Vladan Vučković; Marko Nikolić; Bojan Vasić; Vojislav Dragović; Marko Kuzmanović; Filip Pat; Vladimir Preradović; Srđan "Džoni" Dunkić

Piloti (Serbian Cyrillic: Пилоти, trans. The Pilots) is a Serbian and Yugoslav rock band formed in Belgrade in 1980. Led by vocalist, guitarist and principal songwriter Zoran "Kiki" Lesendrić, Piloti initially immersed in the Yugoslav new wave scene, and later moved towards mainstream pop rock sound, becoming one of the leading pop rock acts on the late 1980s and early 1990s Yugoslav rock scene.

Formed by Zoran Lesendrić (vocals, guitar), Dragan Andrić (bass guitar), Goran Bogićević (guitar) and Nenad Antanasijević (drums), Piloti released their self-titled debut in 1981, achieving large mainstream popularity. Their second studio album Dvadeset godina, released in 1982, featured similar new wave sound. Upon completing the recording of their third album, Piloti went on hiatus, the recorded material ending up unreleased. Lesendrić reformed the band in 1984, the group turning towards more commercial sound, achieving nationwide success with their late 1980s and early 1990s releases. Piloti disbanded in 1997, making a brief reunion in 1998. Following the release of his first solo album in 2008, Lesendrić reformed Piloti once again. The group has released three studio albums since under the name Kiki Lesendrić & Piloti

== History ==
=== New wave years (1980–1983) ===
The original Piloti lineup in 1981

Piloti were formed in September 1980, by former members of Kako (How), a melodic hard rock band whose greatest claim to fame was appearing as one of the opening acts for Bijelo Dugme on their 1979 concert at the Belgrade JNA stadium. The original lineup of Piloti featured Zoran "Kiki" Lesendrić (vocals, guitar), Dragan Andrić "Andra" (bass guitar), Goran Bogićević (guitar) and Nenad Antanasijević (drums), the latter formerly playing with the bands Butik (Boutique) and Lift. During the initial phase of their career, the band appeared on stage wearing uniforms belonging to Bogićević's deceased father, who was a pilot for JAT and died in a plane crash less than a year after Bogićević was born. Years later, Bogićević followed in his father's footsteps and became a civilian pilot himself.

In early 1981, Piloti, alongside other Belgrade bands, performed on a festival in Zagreb entitled Pozdrav iz Beograda (Greetings from Belgrade). On the event, they were spotted by the manager of Austrian musician Falco. He considered either Piloti or Šarlo Akrobata as an opening act for Falco on his upcoming tour, eventually opting for Piloti. Falco, Piloti, West German band Ideal and French band Niagara embarked on a 40-date tour across Austria, France and Switzerland, and on two concerts the four acts were joined by West German punk rock band Big Balls and the Great White Idiot. In May 1981, Piloti competed at the Subotica Youth Festival, but, despite qualifying, did not appear in the festival's finals, as Bogićević, at the time still a high school student, had to return to Belgrade in order to fix his grades. The band soon gained a loyal fanbase owing to their frequent club performances, mod revival-inspired songs and modern ska sound, their popularity leading to a recording contract with PGP-RTB record label.

The band's eponymous debut album was released in September 1981. The album was produced by former Generacija 5 guitarist Dragan Jovanović. All of the tracks were written by Lesendrić, with the exception of lyrics for "Imam diplomu" ("I've Got a Degree"), "Svi smo mi ponekad anđeli" ("We're All Angels Sometimes") and "Veseli momci" ("Jolly Boys"), co-written by Lesendrić and Goran Bogićević, the lyrics dealing with life and dilemmas of Yugoslav city youth. The song "Beogradske klinke" ("Belgrade Girls"), originally recorded for the album, on the insistent of the record label editors appeared on promo single only, due to the mention of irregular menstruation in the lyrics. The songs "Imam diplomu", "Svi smo mi ponekad anđeli", "Ne veruj u idole" ("Don't Believe in Idols") and "Novo odelo" ("New Suit") became hits and provided the band with large attention of Yugoslav media. The album was also published under license in Czechoslovakia and the Soviet Union, eventually selling over 100,000 copies.

Already in June 1982, the band released the followup to their debut album, entitled Dvadeset godina (Twenty Years) and produced by Saša Habić. Two weeks before the beginning of the recording sessions, Antanasijević broke his arm in a traffic accident, but still managed to play on the album recording by taping a drumstick to the broken arm. Despite bringing several minor hits, the album did not repeat the commercial success of the band's debut. The group embarked on the promotional tour, in a changed lineup. Bogićević had to leave the band due to his mandatory stint in the Yugoslav army, leaving Lesendrić as the band's only guitarist. This was followed by Antanasijević's departure; in the following decades, Antanasijević would release four albums of his ambient compositions and form the Bellum Goticum Orchestra. Upon his departure, Lesendrić and Andrić initially considered hiring veteran drummer Dragoljub Đuričić of the recently-disbanded YU Grupa, but eventually opted for Zoran Obradović "Ćera", formerly of Artisti i Modeli (Artists and Models).

In December 1982, the band started working on their third album, with the working title Zvuci civilizacije (Sounds of Civilization). The band recorded the album in Enco Lesić's studio, spending over 600 hours working on the material. However, upon the end of the recording sessions, Lesendrić was drafted to serve his mandatory stint in the Yugoslav army, with Bogićević and Obradović being drafted soon after. Thus, the band went on a hiatus and the recorded material was never released.

=== Pop rock years (1984–1992) ===
Piloti re-assembled during the late 1984, in the lineup featuring Kiki Lesendrić, Goran Bogićević, Zoran Obradović and two new members, brothers Dejan (bass guitar) and Darko Grujić (keyboards), the two previously playing with the band Braća (Brothers). In early 1985, Piloti had several performances at festivals and charity concerts and a number of concerts in the Yugoslav republic of Slovenia. The demo recording of their new song "Kada sanjamo" ("When We Dream") saw large airplay on Yugoslav radio stations, and despite the fact that their latest album had been released three years prior, the group had 58 live performances during the year. On June 15, Piloti, alongside 23 other acts, performed on the Red Star Stadium in Belgrade, on the concert which was a part of YU Rock Misija, a Yugoslav contribution to Live Aid.

In the summer of 1986, the band recorded their third album Kao ptica na mom dlanu (Like a Bird on My Palm) with Dušan "Šane" Petrović as the producer. However, after the recording, Lesendrić dissolved the linuep which recorded the album, deciding to keep only Obradović as a member of the band. They were joined by guitarists Safet "Saja" Petrovac and Milivoje "Miško Plavi" Petrović. Although he gained prominence as the guitarist in the bands VIA Talas, D' Boys and Fantazija (Fantasy), in Piloti Petrović played bass guitar. Kao ptica na mom dlanu was released with a one year-delay, in June 1987. The album presented the band's new, pop rock style, followed by their shift from social commentary of their new wave works towards love songs. The album brought large mainstream popularity to the band, with "Kada sanjamo", "Rekla je da u mojoj glavi čuje gitare i bubjeve" ("She Said She Heard Guitars and Drums in My Head"), "Iza oblaka" ("Beyond the Clouds") and the title track becoming large hits. The follow-up promotional tour was marked by an incident. On 3 July, Piloti played a festival at Split Riva. The group performed after Split glam metal band Osmi Putnik, and the audience threw various objects towards Piloti members throughout their whole performance. At one point, Lesendrić was hit in the head with a bottle, the concert was interrupted, and he ended up in hospital.

At the time of Kao ptica na mom dlanu release, Lesendrić started working as a songwriter for a number of popular Yugoslav singers, and a number of his songs written for other artists became hits, most prominently "Kolačići" ("Little Cookies"), written for Marina Perazić, "Dolazi tiho" ("It's Coming Quietly"), written for Dejan Cukić, "Barakuda" ("Barracuda") and "Arija" ("Aria"), written for Viktorija, and "Spavaju li oči nebeske" ("Are the Eyes in the Sky Asleep"), co-written with Goran Bregović for Zdravko Čolić.

The band's fourth album Osmeh letnje noći (A Midsummer Night Smile) was published in June 1988, and was the first Piloti album to be produced by the band themselves. The album featured guest appearance by Bajaga i Instruktori keyboardist Saša Lokner, while Zoran Lesendrić's brother Bane Lesendrić and Viktorija provided backing vocals. The greatest hit from the album was the ballad "Leto" ("Summer"). After the album release, Petrovac left the band, Petrović switched to guitar and keyboards, and the bass guitarist spot was filled by Bane Lesendrić.

The fifth album Neka te Bog čuva za mene (May God Save You for Me) was produced by the band themselves and published in 1990. It featured guest appearances by Bijelo Dugme members Goran Bregović (guitar) and Laza Ristovski (keyboards), Vlada Negovanović (guitar) and Jova Maljoković (saxophone), and backing vocals were recorded by Zana singer Jelena Galonić and Piloti former member Darko Grujić. The greatest hit from the album was "Tajna je u tebi skrivena" ("The Secret Is Hidden inside You"). The album included a cover of Pete Townshend's song "The Only Thing Left", entitled "Jedino što nam ostaje". The following year, PGP-RTB published Piloti compilation album Najveći hitovi (Greatest Hits), which featured mostly songs from the band's post-new wave phase, with some of their old hits re-recorded for the compilation. During the same year, the band performed at the Belgrade Spring festival, during the evening featuring prominent artists performing popular songs from earlier editions of the festival. Piloti performed the song "Devojko mala" ("Little Girl"), originally performed by actor Vlastimir "Đuza" Stojiljković in the film Love and Fashion, their version appearing on the festival compilation Beograde ((Oh,) Belgrade).

=== Commercial peak, disbandment, brief reunion (1993-1997, 1998) ===
In the early 1990s, collaborating with veteran keyboardist Laza Ristovski (formerly of Smak, Bijelo Dugme and Osvajači), Piloti wrote soundtrack for Darko Bajić's film Zaboravljeni (The Forgotten Ones) and Dragan Kresoja's film Full Moon over Belgrade, with songs from the films released on the album Zaboravljeni. The album included Piloti version of "Spavaju li oči nebeske", originally co-written by Kiki Lesendrić and Goran Bregović for Zdravko Čolić. The songs "Gradovi, ulice" ("Cities, Streets") and "Samo korak do dna" ("Only a Step to Rock Bottom") were co-written by Lesendrić and the band's new drummer Zoran Babović "Babonja" (formerly of Kako and Zana). The album brought the hit ballad "Zaboravljeni", alongside minor hits "Čini mi se da" ("It Seems to Me") and "Kao da je mesec stao za nas dvoje" ("As if the Moon Had Stopped for the Two of Us"). After the collaboration with Piloti, Ristovski became an official member of the band for a period of time. Simultaneously, Lesendrić started the supergroup Dobrovoljno Pevačko Društvo with former Idoli members Srđan Šaper and Nebojša Krstić, recording the album Nedelja na duhove (The Week before Whit Sunday) with the two.

In 1996, Piloti competed at the Budva Summer Festival with the song "Neverna si" ("You Are Unfaithful"). During the same year, Lesendrić and Petrović recorded the album Στο Δρόμο Με Τα Χάλκινα (On the Road with Trumpets) with Greek singer Manolis Mitsias. The album featured Greek language versions of Piloti songs, with Petrović playing accordion, piano, bass guitar and percussion on the recording sessions and producing the album. The following year, Piloti published the album Dan koji prolazi zauvek (A Day which Is Passing Forever), produced by Kiki Lesendrić and Igor Borojević. The songs were composed by Kiki Lesendrić and Zoran Babović, and the lyrics were written by Lesendrić. The album featured guest appearances by Nenad Stefanović "Japanac" on bass guitar, Nenad Jelić on percussion and vocals, Slobodan Marković on keyboards, Ana Popović on slide guitar, Dejan Cukić on vocals in "Lud zbog nje" ("Crazy Because of Her"), and Igor Popović String Quartet. Minor hits from this album were "Neverna si" and "Dan koji prolazi zauvek". At the time, the compilation album Ne veruj u idole was also released, featuring songs from the first five Piloti albums.

In the autumn of 1997, the group disbanded. In 1998, they reunited in the lineup featuring Kiki Lesendrić, Darko and Dejan Grujić and Vlada Migrić (drums), only to disband once again soon after. During their short-time reunion, the band recorded the song "San za jedan dan" ("A Dream for a Day") with singer Marina Perazić, written by Lesendrić and released on Perazić's album Ista kao more (The Same as the Sea).

=== Kiki Lesendrić & Piloti (2009–present) ===
After Piloti disbanded, Kiki Lesendrić worked as songwriter and producer for Greek branches of PolyGram and Universal Music Group, collaborating with a number of popular Greek artists. After a long discographic hiatus, he released his first solo album Mesec na vratima (The Moon at the Door) in 2008. The album songs were composed by Lesendrić and musician and politician Mlađan Dinkić, and the authors of the lyrics were, alongside Lesendrić and Dinkić, Marina Tucaković, Đorđe Balašević, Momčilo Bajagić and Vlada Mrvić. The album guest appearances included Momčilo Bajagić (vocals), Tony Cetinski (vocals), Van Gogh members, Orthodox Celts members Ana Đokić (violin) and Dejan Popin (tin whistle), Vlada Negovanović (guitar), Laza Ristovski (keyboards), Slobodan Marković (keyboards), Dragoljub Đuričić (drums), Ognjen Radivojević (percussion), Uroš Šećerov (percussion), and others. The album had two different versions with different bonus tracks, including a new version of Piloti old hit "Kada sanjamo", featuring singer Tijana Dapčević, a live version of "Neverna si", recorded at the 2008 Exit festival, and the song "Strawberry Wine", recorded with the band Van Gogh.

Following the album release, Lesendrić reformed Piloti for the promotional tour. The band, performing under the name Kiki Lesendrić & Piloti, comprised Lesendrić, guitarists Vlada Negovanović and Vladan Vučković "Paja", bass guitarist Marko Nikolić, keyboardists Bojan Vasić and Vojislav Dragović, drummer Marko Kuzmanović and violinist Filip Pat. After a tour across Serbia, Bosnia and Herzegovina, Croatia, Poland and Italy, in 2010, the band released the live album and the DVD Svet je lep kada sanjamo (The World Is Beautiful When We Dream), recorded on their performance at the 2009 Belgrade Beer Fest and their 2009 concert in Novi Sad Spens Sports Center.

In 2012, the band released the album Slučajno i zauvek (Accidentally and Forever). Beside Lesendrić, a part of the material on the album was written by Mlađan Dinkić, with Đorđe Balašević authoring lyrics for "Queen in Wien (Prvi maj 1978)" ("Queen in Wien (1st of May 1978)") and "Budi tu kad padne sneg" ("Be There When the Snow Falls"). The album was recorded with new members, keyboardist Vladimir Preradović and drummer Srđan "Džoni" Dunkić, while the bass guitar on the recording sessions was played by Van Gogh member Dejan Ilić. The album guest appearances included Spanish flamenco guitarist Rayito, guitarist Predrag Manov, cellist Kristina Ivanković and John Holms Brass Trio. Some concerts on the promotional tour featured Lesendrić's son Đorđe playing the drums.

In 2016, the band released the album album, Širom zatvorenih očiju (Eyes Wide Shut). Two songs on the album were composed by Mlađan Dinkić. The song "Manje-više" featured singer Sara Jo, and other guest appearances included Nenad Zlatanović (of Texas Flood) on guitar, Predrag Manov on guitar, and Ana Štajdohar on backing vocals. The album cover was designed by renowned comic book artist Gradimir Smudja. On 22 April 2016, the band performed, alongside Riblja Čorba, Van Gogh, Galija and Električni Orgazam, at the opening of renovated Tašmajdan Stadium. In 2017, the band released the compilation album Rekla je da u mojoj glavi čuje gitare i bubnjeve, with some of their old hits re-recorded.

In 2022, the band released their latest studio album Mali tragovi na nebu (Small Traces in the Sky), with all the songs authored by Lesendrić, with the exception of "Negde duboko tu" ("Somewhere Deep Down There"), authored by Dinkić.

== Legacy ==
The song "Ne veruj u idole" was covered by Serbian hard rock/heavy metal band Trigger on their 2012 album EX. The song "Kao ptica na mom dlanu" was covered by Serbian pop band The Frajle on their 2019 album Obraduj me (Make Me Happy), with Kiki Lesendrić making guest appearance on the song.

In 2000, the song "Kao ptica na mom dlanu" was polled No.74 on Rock Express Top 100 Yugoslav Rock Songs of All Times list. In 2011, the same song was polled, by the listeners of Radio 202, one of 60 greatest songs released by PGP-RTB/PGP-RTS during the sixty years of the label's existence.

The lyrics of the song "Imam diplomu" ("I Have a Degree") were included in Petar Janjatović's book Pesme bratstva, detinjstva & potomstva: Antologija ex YU rok poezije 1967 - 2007 (Songs of Brotherhood, Childhood & Offspring: Anthology of Ex YU Rock Poetry 1967 - 2007).

== Discography ==
=== Studio albums ===
- Piloti (1981)
- Dvadeset godina (1982)
- Kao ptica na mom dlanu (1987)
- Osmeh letnje noći (1988)
- Neka te bog čuva za mene (1990)
- Zaboravljeni (1993)
- Dan koji prolazi zauvek (1996)
- Slučajno i zauvek (as Kiki Lesendrić & Piloti; 2012)
- Širom zatvorenih očiju (as Kiki Lesendrić & Piloti; 2016)
- Mali tragovi na nebu (as Kiki Lesendrić & Piloti; 2022)

=== Live albums ===
- Svet je lep kada sanjamo (as Kiki Lesendrić & Piloti, 2010)

=== Compilation albums ===
- Najveći hitovi (1991)
- Ne veruj u idole (1997)
- Najveći hitovi (2009)
- Rekla je da u mojoj glavi čuje gitare i bubnjeve (2017)
- Greatest Hits Collecion (2019)

=== Video albums ===
- Svet je lep kada sanjamo (as Kiki Lesendrić & Piloti, 2010)

=== Other appearances ===
- "Devojko mala" (Beograde; 1991)

== See also ==
- New wave music in Yugoslavia
