= Miloš Petrović =

Miloš Petrović may refer to:

- Miloš Petrović (composer), Serbian and Yugoslav musician and composer
- Miloš Petrović (footballer), Serbian football player
