= The Dark Side of the Sun (film) =

1988 film by Božidar Nikolić

- VHS cover art
- Directed by: Božidar Nikolić
- Written by: Andrew Horton; Nikola Jovanović; Željko Mijanović
- Produced by: Anđelo Aranđelović; Mile Citaković; Susan Haken; Duško Mihailov; Boris Nitchoff
- Starring: Brad Pitt; Guy Boyd; Milena Dravić
- Cinematography: Božidar Nikolić
- Edited by: Petar Jakonić
- Music by: Vojislav Kostić; Kornelije Kovač
- Distributed by: Avala Film; Cinequanon Pictures International Inc
- Release dates: 21 December 1988 (Yugoslavia); 5 January 1999 (United States)
- Running time: 101 minutes
- Countries: United States; Yugoslavia
- Language: English

The Dark Side of the Sun (also known as Dark Side of the Sun) is a 1988 American-Yugoslavian drama film directed by Božidar Nikolić and stars Brad Pitt in his first leading role, as a young man in search of a cure for a rare and deadly skin disorder.

Director Božidar Nikolić picked Brad Pitt out of 400 candidates for the main role. Brad Pitt was very happy for the pick and was paid only $1,523 for seven weeks of filming in Kotor and Dubrovnik in Yugoslavia in 1988. The movie was released directly-to-video in 1997.

== Plot ==
Rick Clayton is a young American with a rare skin disease that prevents him from exposing himself to any kind of light, especially sunlight and is mostly seen as an expert motorcyclist, entirely clad from head to toe in leather. After trying several cures without success, his father takes him to a village in Yugoslavia where they meet a healer, who is supposed to save him. Yet the treatment does not work.

Rick then meets Frances, a young American actress, who calls him The Dark Knight, when she falls for him in his full body leather masked identity. Yet when Frances meets Rick unmasked she rejects him, not realizing they are the same person. Back at his family mansion, Rick is so distraught he programs Frances' name to repeat over and over on his computer in BASIC. Finally Rick decides to forget about his illness and enjoy life, feeling the sun on his skin for the first time. The disease takes its course but his father understands the choice he made.

== Cast ==
- Brad Pitt as Rick Clayton
- Guy Boyd as Walter Clayton
- Milena Dravić as Emily Clayton
- Nikola Jovanović as Spake
- Cheryl Pollak as Frances
- Gorica Popović as Nina
- Stole Aranđelović as Vidar
- Constantin Nitchoff as Ed
- Sonja Savić as Alan's Girl

== Home media ==
A Region 4 PAL DVD was released in Australia by the budget label Payless Entertainment under licence from Screen Media.

== Critical reception ==
Birth.Movies.Death. wrote, "It's a pretty obscure movie that isn't readily available to see," adding that it was an, "Absolutely silly movie."

LA Weekly said, "According to legend, the never theatrically released The Dark Side of the Sun was a casualty of the Yugoslavian war. The reels were lost and Pitt wouldn't star in another film until 1991's Johnny Suede. Finally, the film resurfaced in 1997, when it was given a home video release in the States. (Hence the older, goateed Pitt on some of the marketing posters.)"

LA Weekly critic Amy Nicholson wrote about Pitt's voice in the film and how "High his voice used to be, like modern Pitt crossbred with the Chipmunks."

In 2011, Brad Pitt said to Entertainment Weekly magazine in regards to The Dark Side of the Sun, "I think it was shelved because it was lacking in entertainment value."
