= Metropolis Live =

Live album by Trigger
- Released: 2009
- Recorded: Studio 2, TV Metropolis, Belgarde; 2008
- Genre: Hard rock Heavy metal Alternative metal
- Label: PGP-RTS

Trigger chronology
'Trigger' (2007)	Metropolis Live (2009)	'EX' (2012)

Metropolis Live is a live mini-album by Serbian hard rock/heavy metal band Trigger, released in 2008. The album was recorded in 2008 on the band's performance in TV Metropolis show Metropolis Live, and features five songs from the band's debut studio album Ljubav. Metropolis Live was available for free digital download on the band's official website.

== Track listing ==
1. "Navika" – 2:59
2. "Ti od blata praviš me" – 4:26
3. "Dobar pas" – 3:58
4. "Inercija" – 5:08
5. "Više neće biti nas" – 3:58

== Personnel ==
- Milena Branković - vocals
- Dušan Svilokos Đurić - guitar, mixing, mastering
- Marko Antonić - keyboards
- Petar Popović - bass guitar
- Yoran Jović - drums

=== Additional personnel ===
- Dejan Lalić - sound engineering, mixing, mastering
- Vladimir Petrović - artwork
