= Ljubav (Trigger album) =

Studio album by Trigger
- Released: December 2007
- Recorded: 2006; DŽ Studio
- Genre: Hard rock Heavy metal Alternative metal Industrial metal
- Length: 34:28
- Label: PGP-RTS
- Producer: Goran Šimpraga; Dušan Svilokos Đurić

Trigger chronology
Ljubav (2007)	Metropolis Live (2009)

Professional ratings
Review scores
Source	Rating
Barikada	8.5/10 stars
Cmar-net	7.5/10 stars
Mikrofonija	(favorable)
Mulj.net	(favorable)
RockSerbia.net	(favorable)
Serbian-metal.org	(favorable)

Ljubav (trans. Love) is the debut studio album by the Serbian hard rock/heavy metal band Trigger, released in 2007. Ljubav is a concept album, featuring lyrics dealing with dark sides of love.

== Track listing ==
All songs written by Dušan Svilokos Đurić

1. "Igračka (Povedi me u Diznilend)" - 4:03
2. "Više neće biti nas" - 4:05
3. "Jedan dan" - 4:49
4. "Inercija" - 5:11
5. "Glas" - 4:21
6. "Ti si potorošen" - 4:07
7. "Dobar pas" - 4:01
8. "U torbi od plastike" - 4;39
9. "Ti od blata praviš me" - 4:30
10. "Zaspala" - 5:11
11. "Navika" - 2:58
12. "Ljubav: Nisi me naučio da padnem" - 5:21
13. "Ljubav: Pad" - 2:12

== Personnel ==
- Milena Branković - vocals, artwork
- Dušan Svilokos Đurić - guitar, programming, production, artwork
- Petar Popović - bass guitar
- Marko Antnonić - keyboards
- Zoran jović - drums

=== Additional personnel ===
- Goran Šimpraga - production, mixing, mastering
- Vladimir Petrović - artwork, photography, design
