= El Kondor pada =

"El Kondor pada" (Serbian Cyrillic: Ел Кондор пада, lit. 'The Condor is falling') is a satirical song performed by the Serbian theatre troupe Indexovo radio pozorište. It was recorded in 1999 during the war in Kosovo. The song was written by Voja Žanetić and Mićko Ljubičić, borrowing the melody of the Peruvian folk song El Cóndor Pasa.

The song's name is a pun on El Cóndor Pasa. The name El Condor is a fictional code name for the United States F-117 Nighthawk stealth bomber, one of which was shot down during the war.

The lyrics tell the story of a fictional American pilot. He is tricked into believing that the mission is perfectly safe, as his bomber is "invisible" to radar. The song continues by relating the story of his flight and subsequent downing by Yugoslav anti-aircraft defences. The pilot is evacuated with 32 helicopters after having been searched for by peasants with pitchforks. The song also emphasises the supposed ignorance of NATO troops about Kosovo, describing them as not even knowing where it exactly is.

Indexovo radio pozorište, a performing group originally formed at the leading local public radio station in Belgrade, Beograd 202, was very prominent in Serbia due to a series of politically engaged, anti-Milošević theatre plays. As a result, this song quickly became popular in Serbia during the war and was frequently aired on radio stations. Indeksovo radio pozorište recorded a few other songs during this period, satirising all sides involved. The song was later released on the Oproštajni koncert compilation.
