= The Trigger (band) =

Serbian band

- The Trigger, clockwise: Petar Popović, Marko Antonić, Milena Branković, Zoran Jović, Dušan Svilokos Đurić

Background information
- Origin: Belgrade, Serbia
- Genres: Hard rock, heavy metal, alternative metal, industrial metal
- Years active: 2005 – present
- Labels: Massacre Records; Odličan hrčak; PGP-RTS
- Members: Milena Branković; Dušan Svilokos Đurić; Petar Popović; Božidar Mladenović; Zoran Jović
- Past members: Marko Antonić
- Website: www.bandtrigger.com

The Trigger is a Serbian hard rock/heavy metal band from Belgrade.

== History ==
The band was formed in 2005 by guitarist and songwriter Dušan Svilokos Đurić, female vocalist Milena Branković, and bass guitarist Petar "Pera" Popović. Keyboardist Marko Antonić, and drummer Zoran Jović "Đavo" were soon added to their ranks and the five-piece band started working on songs for their debut album, entering the studio in 2006. The band was performing and releasing albums for their domestic market under the name "Trigger", until they added "The" to their name in 2019, for legal reasons, as their first album in English for the international market was about to be released.

The band's debut album Ljubav (Love) was released in December 2007 through PGP-RTS. Ljubav was imagined as a concept album, featuring lyrics dealing with dark sides of love. The album was met with mostly positive reactions by the critics. The promotional video was recorded for the song "Jedan dan" ("A Day"). "Jedan dan" won the first place on TV Panonija chart, TV Metropolis Top 10 chart, and Radio 202 Hit of the Week chart. During the same year, the band started the concert promotion of the album, starting with the appearance on Belgrade Beer Fest. In 2008, the band was awarded with the Discovery of the Year Award by TV Metropolis, and was polled the Best Young Band of 2008 by the listeners of the Radio 202 show Hit 202.

In 2009, the band released the live mini-album Metropolis Live, consisting of five songs from Ljubav, recorded in 2008 at the band's performance in the TV Metropolis show Metropolis Live. The album was available for free via a digital download at the band's official site. In 2009, the band also recorded the video for the song "Više neće biti nas" ("There Will Be no more of Us"), and won the Metal Album of the Award at the Sarajevo Indexi Awards Ceremony. The band also appeared on a New York City Hard Rock Radio Live compilation. In 2010, Dušan Svilokos Đurić and Milena Branković, under the name "Disparador", appeared on the various artists album Vreme brutalnih dobronamernika, which featured seventeen bands which recorded songs of poems of a Serbian poet Milan B. Popović. Disparador participated in the compilation with the gothic industrial-oriented song "Pokrov iznad mene" ("Shroud above Me").

In 2011, the band announced the release of a new studio album, entitled EX, which will feature covers of songs by former Yugoslav new wave artists. The band promoted their upcoming album with a concert in Belgrade club Danguba, featuring guest appearance by the heavy metal band Forever Storm. The first part of the album, containing covers of Piloti song "Ne veruj u idole" ("Do not Believe in Idols"), Azra song "Kurvini sinovi" ("Sons of Whores"), and Haustor song "Ena", was available for free download from the band's official website in May 2011. The second part of the album, featuring a cover of VIS Simboli song "Bejbi, bejbi" ("Baby, Baby"), a cover of Bulevar song "Trenutni lek" ("Momentary Remedy") and a cover of Petar i Zli Vuci song "Ogledalo" ("Mirror"), was released for free download in May 2012. The third and final part of the album, featuring a cover of Jakarta song "Spiritus" and a cover of Beograd song "Opasne igre" ("Dangerous Games"), was released in November 2012. Keyboardist Marko Antonić leaves the band after EX, and instead of looking for a replacement keyboard player, the band continues as a four-piece.

In July 2013, the band released the single "Ne hrani ljudoždere" ("Do Not Feed the Cannibals"), featuring guest appearance by Downstroy vocalist Darko Živković. The single announced the band's upcoming studio album. After releasing singles "Srećna nova" and "Ponor", featuring guest appearance by Block Out vocalist Milutin "Mita" Jovičić, The Trigger got their third album "Vreme čuda" out in 2015 with the "Odličan hrčak" label. The band also added a new member, Božidar Mladenović (Ex By-Pass) as a second guitarist. Along with Darko Živković and Milutin Jovančić, the album featured guest appearances of Manntra vocalist marko Matijević Sekul on the song "Bum", Vladimir Lalić (Organized Chaos, Viva Vox) and guitar virtuoso Emir Hot on the song "Realiti", Borko Basarić (Azil 5), Dragana Mijatović (Hype), Ljiljana Zdravković (The Bite), Katarina Popović (Aetar) and others. The album got positive reviews: Serbian Metal chose Vreme čuda as the domestic metal album of the Year, and Balkanrock has included the album in the "Best regional rock albums" list for 2015. Stylistically, the album shows the band gravitating towards modern metal guitar driven sound with less electronic and gothic influences compared to Ljubav, but still exploring new territory in songs like the nine minute album closer "Ponor" that channels a lot of progressive and ambient influences.

After Vreme čuda, The Trigger focused on finishing their first album in the English language, for the international market. In 2019, the band announced that it has signed a record deal with Massacre Records. At the same time, the band changed the name to "The Trigger" to avoid possible legal complications, as the name "Trigger" has also been in use by other bands. After releasing singles "Pray" and "What Have We Become", their fourth album, "The Time of Miracles" was released in 2019. The album consists of reworked material from previous albums and features some of the guests from Vreme Čuda, now performing their vocal parts in English. The Time of Miracles got generally positive reviews.

== Discography ==
=== Studio albums ===
- Ljubav (2007)
- EX (2012)
- Vreme čuda (2015)
- The Time of Miracles (2019)

=== Live albums ===
- Metropolis Live (2009)
