= Lekoviti Show =

- Created by: Dragoljub Mićko Ljubičić; Voja Žanetić
- Written by: Dragoljub Mićko Ljubičić; Voja Žanetić
- Presented by: Dragoljub Mićko Ljubičić (as Dr Agoljub)
- Starring: Loco Band (house band); Sanja Popović; Nina Radosavović
- Opening theme: "Lekoviti Show"
- No. of seasons: 1
- No. of episodes: 12

Production
- Producers: B92; Tim Talenata
- Running time: 44 minutes (without commercials)

Original release
- Network: B92
- Release: March 31, 2015 – present

The Lekoviti Show ("Healing Show"), is a Serbian sketch comedy and variety show talk show hosted by Dragoljub Mićko Ljubičić, in character as Dr Agoljub, on B92. The show premiered on March 31, 2015 and is produced by B92 and Tim Talenata. Each episode features a celebrity who acts like a patient with problems such as bribe-giving.

It is filmed at Prva TV Studios in Zemun, Serbia.

Every episode opens with Dr Agoljub's monologue. Second segment is a "hidden camera" in waiting room where guest talks to a man in a suit (portrayed by Dragoljub Mićko Ljubičić), who is resembling to Serbian prime minister Aleksandar Vučić. Third part is Dr Agoljub's talk with a patient of the evening.

== Season 1 ==
Number of episode	Air Date	Guests
1	March 31, 2015	Mitar Kićanović Mita (portrayed by Marko Gvero)
2	April 7, 2015	Radiša Rade Džabić (portrayed by Gordan Kičić)
3	April 14, 2015	Miroljub Mirković (portrayed by Ljubomir Bandović)
