= Jakarta (band) =

Serbian and Yugoslav rock band

- Jakarta in 1984

Background information
- Origin: Belgrade, SR Serbia, SFR Yugoslavia
- Genres: Synth-funk; art pop; pop rock; power pop
- Years active: 1981–1988; 2014–2020
- Labels: PGP-RTB, Mascom Records
- Past members: Igor Popović; Jane Parđovski; Rade Bulatović; Miloš Petrović; Ivan Fece; Miroslav Karlović

Jakarta was a Serbian and Yugoslav rock band formed in Belgrade in 1981.

The band was formed by vocalist Igor Popović and guitarist Jane Parđovski, and initially went through numerous lineup changes, before a steady lineup was formed, consisting of Popović, Parđovski, Rade Bulatović (bass guitar), Miloš Petrović (keyboards) and Ivan Fece (drums). Jakarta released their debut, synth-funk-oriented album Maske za dvoje in 1984 to good reception by Yugoslav audience and critics. The band's second album, pop rock-oriented Bomba u grudima, released in 1986, failed to repeat the success of the band's debut, and the band split up two years after its release. Following the release of a best of compilation in 2013, Popović recorded the album Letim with a group of Belgrade musicians, releasing it as the third Jakarta album in 2020.

== Band history ==
=== 1981–1988 ===
Jakarta was formed in Belgrade in 1981. During the initial period, the band went through numerous lineup changes, before original members Igor Popović (vocals) and Jane Parđovski (guitar), the latter formerly of the band Butik (Boutique), started performing with Rade Bulatović "Čeja" (bass guitar), Miloš Petrović (keyboards) and Ivan Fece "Firchie" (drums). Fece was previously a member of the band Luna, and Petrović was a graduate from the Belgrade Faculty of Music and simultaneously played with the jazz band Jazzy. Jakarta gained the attention of the public performing as the opening act for U Škripcu, and was soon offered a contract by PGP-RTB record label.

The band released their debut, synth-funk-oriented album Maske za dvoje (Masks for Two) in 1984 through PGP-RTB record label. The album was produced by Saša Habić, and featured Paul Pignon (saxophone), Kire Mitrev (trombone), Goce Dimitrovski (trumpet) and Ivan Švager (tenor saxophone) as guests. The album saw success with Yugoslav music critics and audience, bringing the hits "Spiritus", "Piromanija" ("Pyromania"), "Dama sa severa" ("Lady from the North") and "Pozovi me" ("Call Me"). The song "Nebo je još plavo zbog tebe" ("The Sky Is Still Blue because of You") was originally intended to be a duet of Popović and Massimo Savić of the band Dorian Gray; however, the song ended up with Popović on vocals only, as Savić had an exclusive contract with Jugoton record label. In 1985, Popović appeared as vocalist in the Rex Ilusivii song "Arabia", released on the various artists compilation album Ventilator 202 Demo Top 10 Vol. 3, and took a part in the YU Rock Misija project, a Yugoslav contribution to Live Aid. On 15 June 1985, Jakarta, alongside 23 other acts, performed at the corresponding charity concert at the Red Star Stadium in Belgrade.

The band's second album, Bomba u grudima (Bomb in the Chest), recorded with the new drummer Miroslav Karlović and produced by Habić, was released in 1986. With Bomba u grudima Jakarta moved towards pop rock sound. Despite "Reci gde je lova" ("Tell Us Where's the Money"), "Mali policajci" ("Little Policemen") and the title track receiving some airplay, the album was not well received by music critics and the band's fans, and Jakarta quietly retired from the scene.

=== Post breakup ===
After Jakarta disbanded, Igor Popović moved to Italy, where he, for a period of time, owned a small fashion company. Petrović gained a magister degree from the Belgrade Faculty of Music and started a successful career in classical music and jazz. He died in Belgrade on 13 November 2010. Rade Bulatović dedicated himself to jazz, performing with a number of Serbian jazz musicians. He composed music for Milutin Petrović's 1988-1989 TV series Dome, slatki dome (Home Sweet Home) and for Vladimir Blaževski's 1992 film Boulevard of the Revolution. In 2019, he released the solo album Very True with his jazz compositions. Parđovski retired from music, later becoming a judge of high court. He died in a railway accident on 3 June 2011.

=== 2014–2020 ===
In December 2013, the compilation album entitled San je jak (The Dream Is Strong) was released, with 12 songs recorded between 1982 and 1986. Following the release of the compilation, in January 2014, Popović announced the new Jakarta album. In November 2020, Popović released the comeback album Letim (I'm Flying). Letim featured Popović on vocals, Jane Parđovski's son Vuk Parđovski on guitar, Dejan Grujić on guitar and 12-string guitar, Goran Antović on keyboards, Darko Grujić on keyboards and Dadiša Aksentijević on drums; brothers Dejan Grujić (of Orthodox Celts and formerly of Čutura & Oblaci and Ruž) and Darko Grujić (of Point Blank and Nikola Čuturilo's backing band and formerly of Sirova Koža) were, at the beginning of the 1980s, members of one of Jakarta's early lineups. The album was announced by the singles "Selo Banja" ("Village Banja") and "Tamna strana meseca" ("The Dark Side of the Moon"). It was produced by Saša Habić, and featured a number of covers: the title track is a cover of Simple Minds song "Someone Somewhere in Summertime", the song "Dodole" ("Dodola") is a cover of The House of Love song "Gotta Be That Way", the song "Jug" ("South") is a cover of Negrita song "Rotolando verso sud", and the song "Selo Banja" is a cover of Peter Gabriel's song "Solsbury Hill". Serbian language lyrics for the latter were written by writer Goran Skrobonja. The album also included two covers of Fleetwood Mac song "Big Love", a version with original lyrics and a Serbian language version entitled "Prava ljubav" ("True Love"), and a cover of the song "Jagode i maline" ("Strawberries and Raspberries") by Yugoslav band Korni Grupa.

== Legacy ==
In 2012, the song "Spiritus" was covered by Serbian heavy metal band Trigger for their cover album EX. In 2013, the same song was covered by Serbian DJ SevdahBABY and singer Djixx, their version entitled "Ti mi se tako sviđaš" ("I Like You so Much", after the song chorus), for the 2013 album Sega Mega, ti i ja (Sega Mega, You and Me).

The history of Jakarta and the career of Igor Popović were the inspiration for the story of the fictional band Kalkuta (Kolkata) and their frontman Lazar Petronijević in the 2017 novel Kada kažeš da sam tvoj (When You Say I'm Yours) by Serbian writer Goran Skrobonja.

In 2011, the song "Pozovi me" was polled, by the listeners of Radio 202, one of 60 greatest songs released by PGP-RTB/PGP-RTS during the 60 years of label's history.

== Discography ==
=== Studio albums ===
- Maske za dvoje (1984)
- Bomba u grudima (1986)
- Letim (2020)

=== Compilation albums ===
- San je jak (2013)

=== Singles ===
- "Amerika" / "Put u bajano" (1983)
- "Spiritus" / "Problem" (1984)
- "Osvojiću svet" / "Osvojiću svet – Instrumental" (1985)
