= Balkan Spy =

Balkanski špijun
- DVD cover
- Balkanski špijun; Балкански шпијун
- Directed by: Dušan Kovačević; Božidar Nikolić
- Written by: Dušan Kovačević (play and screenplay)
- Produced by: Milan Božić
- Starring: Bata Stojković; Bora Todorović; Mira Banjac; Zvonko Lepetić
- Cinematography: Božidar Nikolić; Petar Bata Mašić
- Edited by: Andrija Zafranović
- Music by: Vojislav Kostić
- Production company: Union Film Belgrade
- Release date: 23 February 1984
- Running time: 95 minutes
- Country: Yugoslavia
- Language: Serbian

Balkan Spy (Serbo-Croatian: Balkanski špijun, Serbian Cyrillic: Балкански шпијун) is a 1984 Yugoslav comedy drama film directed by Dušan Kovačević and Božidar Nikolić. It is based on a play of the same title.

The film is primarily set in Belgrade. It centers on Ilija Čvorović, a paranoid retiree and former Stalinist, who served two years in prison because of his political beliefs. Because of his paranoia, he pursues his sub-tenant, a returnee from France, whom he sees as an agent of dark imperialist forces, an enemy of the state, and a spy.

== Plot ==
Ilija Čvorović (Bata Stojković), a former Stalinist who spent several years in a prison on Goli otok, is contacted by the police to answer routine questions about his sub-tenant, Petar Markov Jakovljević (Bora Todorović), a businessman who spent twenty years living in Paris and has returned to Belgrade to open a tailor shop. After a couple minutes, Ilija is free to go but is visibly shaken by the encounter and begins to suspect that his sub-tenant, Petar, might be a spy.

As time passes, Ilija becomes convinced that Petar, a progressive man from a capitalist country, represents a great threat to national security and the socialist system, and begins spying on him. Ilija's wife Danica (Mira Banjac) is more concerned about the future of their daughter Sonja (Sonja Savić), a recent graduate of dental school, is unable to find a job.

After a bout of spying, Ilija phones inspector Dražić (Milan Štrljić), claiming that Petar was meeting with "suspicious people" (actually Petar's intellectual friends), but Dražić does not take him seriously. Ilija decides to take matters into his own hands. He begins his own surveillance operation against the innocent man and his friends. Eventually, he bars his house, buys a guard dog, arms himself with munition, and even gets help from his brother Đura (Zvonko Lepetić), who also becomes convinced that Petar is a foreign agent.

One evening, Ilija is accidentally hit by a car, which he sees as an assassination attempt. Soon, even Danica starts to believe Ilija, but Sonja believes that her father is suffering from paranoia. Đuro manages to capture several of Petar's friends, holding them in his basement, beating them up and making them "reveal their terrorist plans". Petar comes to Ilija's house, where he finds Danica. Petar says that he wanted to say goodbye, as he is traveling to New York, and asks Danica why Ilija and his brother are following him, thus revealing that he was aware of their "surveillance operation".

Ilija and Đura crash into the house, sending Danica away, tying Petar to a chair, beating him and forcing him to "confess". Petar keeps claiming that he is not a spy, but the brothers do not believe him. Đura leaves the house for a while, to bring one of Petar's friends who "admitted everything", and Ilija continues to interrogate Petar. However, Ilija gets too excited and has a heart attack. Petar manages to get to the phone and call the ambulance, and then, still handcuffed to the chair, he leaves the house to try to catch his plane. Ilija, while in severe pain, phones Đura's house and tells his wife to tell him to "block the airport". He then crawls out of the house, and starts crawling after Petar, with his dog following him.

== Cast ==
- Bata Stojković as Ilija Čvorović
- Bora Todorović as Petar Jakovljević
- Mira Banjac as Danica Čvorović
- Sonja Savić as Sonja Čvorović
- Zvonko Lepetić as Đura Čvorović
- Bata Živojinović as pancake seller
- Predrag Laković as professor
- Branka Petrić as journalist
- Milivoje Tomić as doctor
- Milan Štrljić as inspector Dražić
- Milan Mihailović as painter
- Ljiljana Cincar-Danilović as choirmaster
- Mihajlo Ćirin as passerby
- Bora Dujić as cousin
- Slobodan Ivetić as salesman
- Ljiljana Jovanović as inspector's secretary
- Đorđe Kovačević as man at inspector's place
- Milorad Novaković as cousin
- Ratko Novaković as cousin
- Tomislav Pejčić as cousin
- Danica Petković as saleswoman
- Dragoljub Petrović as photographer
- Ras Rastoder as porter 1
- Zoran Ratković as cross-eyed young man
- Vladan Živković as worker
- Bogdan Diklić as man at the theater
- Ljubo Škiljević as porter 2

== Themes ==
Kovačević's work talks about the relationship between the individual and the government, individual and totalitarian consciousness, and the consequences of a system that demands absolute obedience, which are primarily manifested in the loss of reason and the disintegration of the family. Because of such contradictions, such a system is an idea that destroys itself, and sees its survival in the search for "invisible enemies". The main character, Ilija Čvorović, who was a victim of such a political mechanism and tyranny, now takes on the role of the persecutor and becomes an instrument of that very system as he pursues and spies on Peter, a completely innocent person, in order to prove his obedience to the authorities. Thus he turns out to be a tragicomic figure who completes a full circle of infernal insanity of an order that promotes paranoia, fear, hatred and loss of reason.

== Awards ==
- Montréal World Film Festival, 1984 - Best Screenplay
- Pula Film Festival, 1984 - Best Film, Best Actor (Bata Stojković)

== Legacy ==
On 28 December 2016, the Yugoslav Film Archive, authorised by the Law on Cultural Heritage, declared one hundred Serbian feature films made between 1911 to 1999 as cultural heritage of great importance, including Balkan Spy.

== See also ==
- List of Yugoslav films
