= Dragoljub Ljubičić =

Serbian actor (born 1972)

- Драгољуб Љубичић
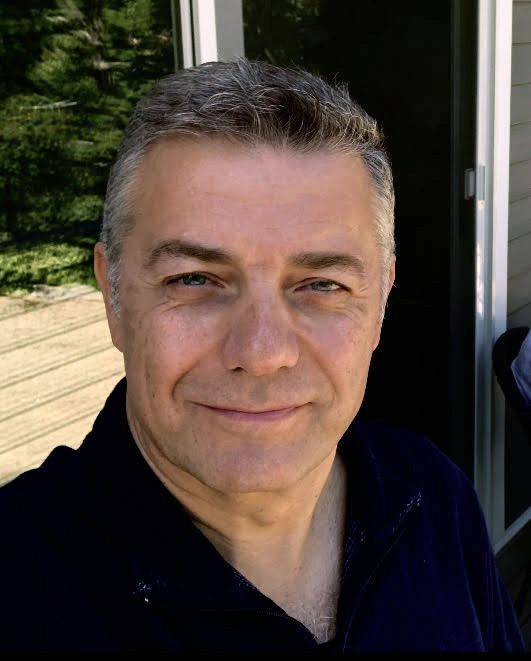
- Dragoljub Mićko Ljubičić in September 2019
- Born: 3 January 1962 (age 64); Belgrade, Yugoslavia
- Education: University of Belgrade
- Occupations: Actor, comedian
- Years active: 1982–present

Dragoljub "Mićko" Ljubičić (Serbian: Драгољуб "Мићко" Љубичић; born 3 January 1962) is a Serbian actor, humorist, and comedian, best known for his involvement with the television programs Indexovo radio pozorište, Pozovi M... ili će on tebe and PLjiŽ.

== Early career ==
Sometimes billed as Dragoljub S. Ljubičić Mićko, he studied law at the University of Belgrade but left in his third year without graduating, being simultaneously involved with music and radio advertising.

In 1984, he joined Indexovo radio pozorište (Index's Radio Theatre), a popular Serbian radio programme that eventually grew into a theatrical group. There he began as an actor, but soon became a co-writer with Vojislav Žanetić.

== Film ==
In 1994, Ljubičić appeared in director Želimir Žilnik's semi-documentary film Tito, po drugi put među Srbima ("Tito, Among the Serbs For the Second Time", 1994. He played the role of Josip Broz Tito, who returns from the dead to a Serbia that is ruled by Slobodan Milošević, and talks (improvises) with random people on the streets of Belgrade about their current grievances. He provides the voice of Buzz Lightyear in the Serbian dub Toy Story franchise.

== Television ==
=== Hosting ===
In 2007, he had his first TV show on TV B92 called Pozovi M... ili će on tebe ("Dial M... Or He Will Dial You").

In March 2015, he started hosting his second TV show, Lekoviti show ("The Medicine Show"), written with Voja Žanetić. It lasted for 12 episodes.

Ljubičić currently co-hosts PLjiŽ, a political satirical show, along with Vojislav Žanetić and Dragoljub Petrović (the show's acronym stand for their names).

=== Acting ===
Ljubičić has also appeared on comedy series over the years. Among them are "Priđi bliže" ("Come closer") and "Selo gori a baba se češlja" ("Grandma doesn't bother that the village is on flame"), both from 2010.

He will be part of the cast of a new television series Kljun, set to air in the fall of 2021 on Nova S.

== Theatre ==
On May 27, 2011, Ljubičić had a premiere of his one-man-show, the cabaret-monodrama ONE Stvari ("THOSE Things"), based on a play by Bernhard Ludwig, Austrian sexual therapist.

On September 30, 2016, he premiered Danas nam je divno ("Today Is The Lowlife Day"), another theatre play written in collaboration with Voja Žanetić. It is another strong satire, combined with comedy.

== Advertising ==
In 1985, with a few of his friends (Vlada Petrović, Jasminka Petrović, and Dado Pejoski), Ljubičić co-founded and became the creative director of TIM TALENATA Advertising Agency, which still exists and operates as a "creative boutique", best known for its creativity in Radio and TV commercials.

Ljubičić received the UEPS Lifetime Achievement Award in 2015.

== Books ==
Ljubičić has written three books. Nacionalni park Srbija ("Serbia - The National Park" Vol. 1 and Vol. 2 in 1999 and 2007 respectively).

The third book is called "Priče za laku noć (posle kojih niste mogli da zaspite)" (The Good Night Stories - That Didn't Let You Sleep"), and is a collection of short stories from the popular TV show PLjiŽ, from the first 5 seasons (52 in total). It was published by "Balbelo" publishing house from Novi sad.

== Music ==
From 1982 until 1985, Ljubičić played in two bands: Petar i zli vuci and Kapetan Belkanto.

He has a music CD called Truba... i druge priče (The trumpet... and the other stories) which was released in 2005.

== See also ==
- "El kondor pada"
