= Dobrovoljno Pevačko Društvo =

- Dobrovoljno Pevačko Društvo, from left to right: Zoran "Kiki" Lesendrić, Nebojša Krstić and Srđan Šaper

Background information
- Origin: Belgrade, Serbia, FR Yugoslavia
- Genre: Pop rock
- Years active: 1994–1995
- Label: Eastfield Music
- Members: Nebojša Krstić; Srđan Šaper; Kiki Lesendrić

Dobrovoljno Pevačko Društvo was a Serbian supergroup consisting of former Idoli members Nebojša Krstić and Srđan Šaper and Piloti frontman Kiki Lesendrić. The band released only one album and disbanded.

== History ==
Idoli members Nebojša Krstić (drum loops, vocals) and Srđan Šaper (vocals) started working with Kiki Lesendrić (guitar) in 1994 and preparing music for an album. The recording took place in Budapest in the Utopia Studio during early 1995. Beside the three, as guest appeared Nenad Stefanović "Japanac" (bass guitar and guitar), Milan Đurđević (Neverne Bebe leader, keyboards), Istvan Alapi (guitar) and Zoltan Hetenyi (drums). Backing vocals were done by Aleksandra and Kristina Kovač. The arrangements and production were done by Lesendrić. The album was released by Eastfield Music under the name Nedelja na Duhove. Promotional video was recorded for the track "Čekaj me". Even though the album was commercially successful, the band ceased to exist.

In 2005 Nebojša Krstić stated in an interview that Šaper prepared some new material for a new album, but due to obligations, they are not able to record.

== Discography ==
=== Studio albums ===
- Nedelja na Duhove (1995)

== External links and references ==
- EX YU ROCK enciklopedija 1960-2006, Janjatović Petar; ISBN 978-86-905317-1-4
- Dobrovoljno Pevačko Društvo discography at Discogs
