= Kiki Lesendrić =

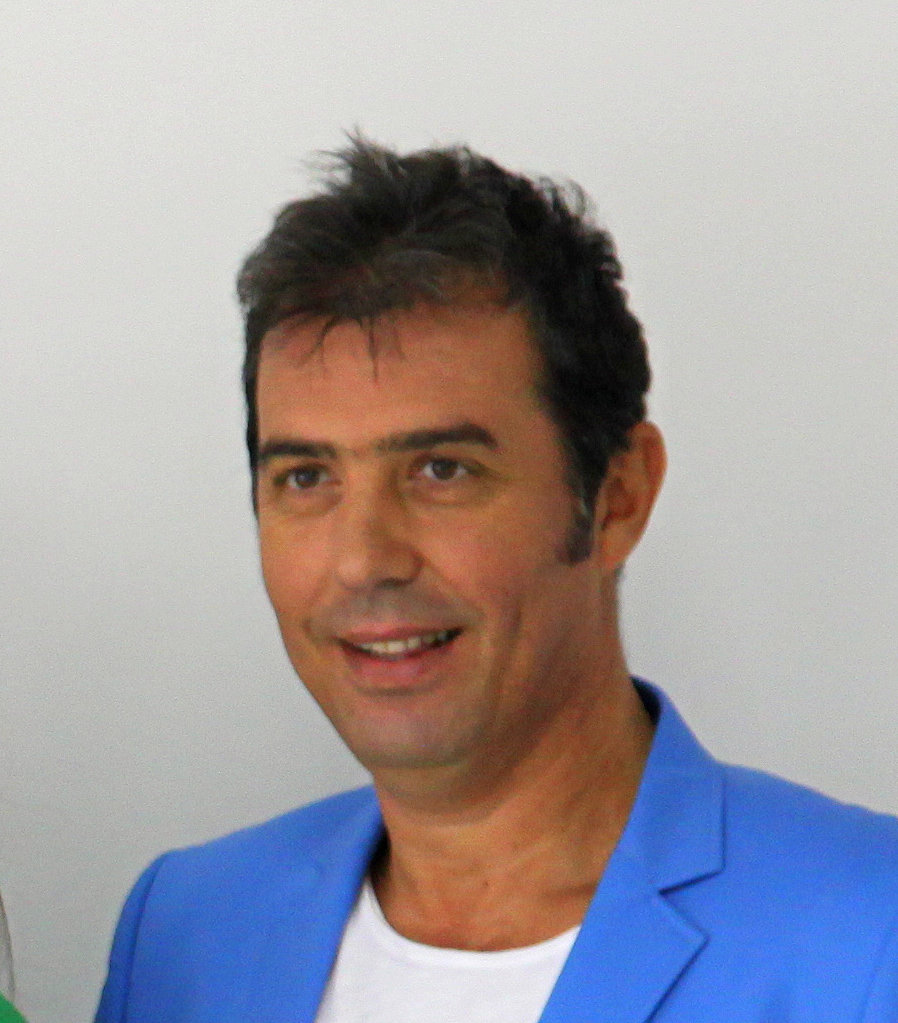
- Lesendrić in 2013

Background information
- Born: 2 January 1961 (age 65); Belgrade, PR Serbia, FPR Yugoslavia
- Origin: Belgrade, Serbia
- Genres: New wave; ska; rock; pop rock; power pop
- Occupations: Singer; guitarist; songwriter; composer; music producer
- Instruments: Vocals; guitar
- Years active: 1979–present
- Labels: PGP-RTB, PGP-RTS, Komuna, Eastfield Music, Bread Ventures Records, Power Music, City Records, Croatia Records

Zoran "Kiki" Lesendrić (Serbian Cyrillic: Зоран "Кики" Лесендрић) is a Serbian and Yugoslav musician, songwriter, composer and music producer, best known as the vocalist, guitarist and principal songwriter of the popular rock band Piloti.

Lesendrić started his musical career in late 1970s. He was one of the forming members of Piloti, which soon after the formation became a prominent act of the Yugoslav new wave scene. After making a shift towards commercial pop rock sound, the band reached the peak of popularity in late 1980s and early 1990s, disbanding in 1997. Lesendrić reformed Piloti in 2008, following the release of his first solo album. With Piloti, Lesendrić has recorded ten studio albums and a live album.

In addition to his work with Piloti, Lesendrić was also a member of the supergroup Dobrovoljno Pevačko Društvo. He has worked as songwriter and music producer with a number of prominent artists from former Yugoslav republics and Greece, and has composed scores for several films.

== Biography ==
=== Early life ===
Lesendrić was born on 2 January 1961 in Belgrade. His father was an electromechanic and his mother was a housewife. His interest in music was influenced by his older sister, who was a fan of The Beatles and Tom Jones. During the 1970s, Lesendrić's biggest musical influences were British hard rock and glam rock bands and Yugoslav band and Bijelo Dugme.

=== Early career (late 1970s–1980) ===
Lesendrić started his musical career as a member of the band Kako (How), which he formed in late 1970s with his neighborhood friend, drummer Dragan Andrić "Andra". Kako performed melodic hard rock with elements of jazz rock, and the group's biggest success was appearing as one of the opening acts for Bijelo Dugme on their 1979 concert at the Belgrade JNA stadium.

=== Piloti (1980–1997, 2009–present) ===
Lesendrić formed Piloti in 1980 with Dragan Andrić (bass guitar), Goran Bogićević (guitar) and Nenad Antanasijević (drums). The band's debut self-titled album, released in 1981, featured mod revival-inspired songs and modern ska sound, and was met with good reception by the public, with several album songs becoming large hits. The band's second album, titled Dvadeset godina (Twenty Years) and released in 1982, featured similar new wave sound. The band recorded their third studio album in 1983, but the material remained unreleased due to Lesendrić being drafted to serve his mandatory stint in the Yugoslav People's Army. Upon his return from the army, Lesendrić re-assembled Piloti, the group turning towards more radio-friendly pop rock sound. Their late 1980s and early 1990s albums Kao ptica na mom dlanu (Like a Bird on My Palm, 1987), Osmeh letnje noći (A Midsummer Night Smile, 1988), Neka te Bog čuva za mene (May God Save You for Me, 1990) and Zaboravljeni (The Forgotten Ones, 1993) brought a number of major hits. The band disbanded in 1997, which was followed by a brief 1998 reunion. In 2008, after a long discographic hiatus, Lesendrić released his first solo album Mesec na vratima (The Moon at the Door). Following the album release, Lesendrić reformed Piloti, and the group has released three studio albums and a live album since, under the name Kiki Lesendrić & Piloti.

=== Dobrovoljno Pevačko Društvo (1994–1995) ===
Lesendrić formed the supergroup Dobrovoljno Pevačko Društvo in 1994 with former Idoli members Srđan Šaper and Nebojša Krstić. In 1995, the group released the album Nedelja na duhove (The Week before Whit Sunday). Lesendrić wrote music for part of the songs, wrote part of the music arrangements and produced the album. The group ended their activity soon after the album release.

=== Songwriting ===
In late 1980s, Lesendrić started working as a songwriter for a number of popular Yugoslav singers, and a number of his songs written for other artists became hits, most prominently "Kolačići" ("Little Cookies"), written for Marina Perazić, "Dolazi tiho" ("It's Coming Quietly"), written for Dejan Cukić, "Barakuda" ("Barracuda") and "Arija" ("Aria"), written for Viktorija, and "Spavaju li oči nebeske" ("Are the Eyes in the Sky Asleep"), co-written with Goran Bregović for Zdravko Čolić. Lesendrić would continue to write songs for other artists during the following decades. He wrote most of the songs for the 1999 album Snovi od somota (Velvet Dreams) by pop singer Hani and for the 2001 self-titled album by Đorđe David & Fuzzbox. He has written songs for a number of pop and folk acts from the region of former Yugoslavia, including Željko Samardžić, Zoran Kalezić, Aca Lukas, Aco Regina, Seka Aleksić, Viki Miljković, Indira Radić, Jana, Ana Nikolić, Marta Savić, Dženan Lončarević, Sanja Đorđević, Tony Cetinski, Romana, and Tijana Dapčević.

In 1993, Lesendrić started working as composer and music producer for Greek branches of PolyGram and Universal Music Group, collaborating with a number of popular Greek artists, including George Dalaras, Panos Kiamos, Michalis Hatzigiannis, Alkistis Protopsalti, Dimitra Galani, Onirama and others. The Greek language lyrics for his songs were written mainly by his long-time collaborator Lina Nikolakopoulou. In 1996, Lesendrić and his Piloti bandmate Miško Plavi recorded the album Στο Δρόμο Με Τα Χάλκινα (On the Road with Trumpets) with Greek singer Manolis Mitsias, the album featuring Greek language versions of Piloti songs.

=== Film score composing ===
Lesendrić ventured into composing film music in early 1990s, when Piloti, collaborating with keyboardist Laza Ristovski, wrote soundtracks for Darko Bajić's film Zaboravljeni (The Forgotten Ones) and Dragan Kresoja's film Full Moon over Belgrade, with songs from the films released on the hit album Zaboravljeni. Lesendrić wrote music for Darko Bajić's films Balkan Rules (1997), The Beautiful Blue Danube (2008) and We Will Be the World Champions (2015), Balša Đogo's film Klasa (Class, 2002), Boško Savković's film In the Beginning Was the Word (2007) and for Bojan Andrejek's upcoming film Kofer (Suitcase). The music he wrote for Greek documentary series On the Shadow of War was released as a soundtrack album. Lesendrić also co-wrote the music for George Cacoyannis' film Electra and for Ivica Vidanović documentary series We Were World Champions (2015).

=== Other activities ===
From 2013 to 2015 Lesendrić was a judge on the X Factor Adria series.

He made a cameo appearance in the 2012 TV series Comrade Black in WWII.

== Personal life ==
Lesendrić served his mandatory army stint as a member of the elite 63rd Parachute Brigade.

He publicly supported the 2024–present Serbian anti-corruption protests, appearing on protests alongside other former members of the 63rd Parachute Brigade.

== Legacy ==
In 2000, Piloti song "Kao ptica na mom dlanu" was polled No.74 on Rock Express Top 100 Yugoslav Rock Songs of All Times list. In 2011, the same song was polled, by the listeners of Radio 202, one of 60 greatest songs released by PGP-RTB/PGP-RTS during the sixty years of the label's existence.

The lyrics of Piloti song "Imam diplomu" ("I Have a Degree"), authored by Lesendrić, were included in Petar Janjatović's book Pesme bratstva, detinjstva & potomstva: Antologija ex YU rok poezije 1967 - 2007 (Songs of Brotherhood, Childhood & Offspring: Anthology of Ex YU Rock Poetry 1967 - 2007).

== Discography ==
=== With Piloti ===
==== Studio albums ====
- Piloti (1981)
- Dvadeset godina (1982)
- Kao ptica na mom dlanu (1987)
- Osmeh letnje noći (1988)
- Neka te bog čuva za mene (1990)
- Zaboravljeni (1993)
- Dan koji prolazi zauvek (1996)
- Slučajno i zauvek (as Kiki Lesendrić & Piloti; 2012)
- Širom zatvorenih očiju (as Kiki Lesendrić & Piloti; 2016)
- Mali tragovi na nebu (as Kiki Lesendrić & Piloti; 2022)

==== Live albums ====
- Svet je lep kada sanjamo (as Kiki Lesendrić & Piloti, 2010)

==== Compilation albums ====
- Najveći hitovi (1991)
- Ne veruj u idole (1997)
- Najveći hitovi (2009)
- Rekla je da u mojoj glavi čuje gitare i bubnjeve (2017)
- Greatest Hits Collecion (2019)

==== Video albums ====
- Svet je lep kada sanjamo (as Kiki Lesendrić & Piloti, 2010)

=== With Dobrovoljno Pevačko Društvo ===
==== Studio albums ====
- Nedelja na Duhove (1995)

=== Solo ===
==== Studio albums ====
- Mesec na vratima (2008)
