= Slobodan Marunović =

Montenegrin actor

Slobodan Marunović Слободан Маруновић
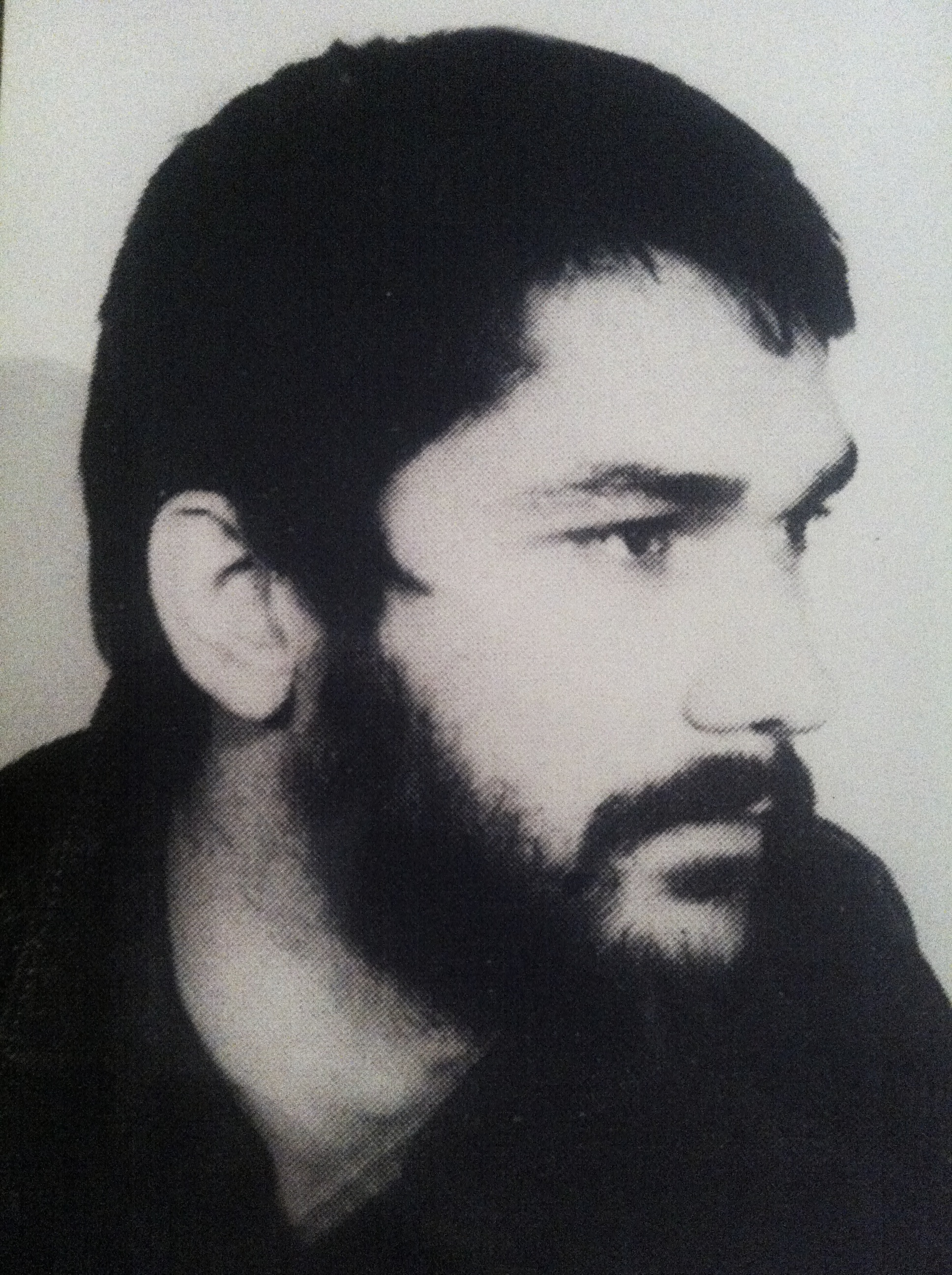
- Born: Slobodan Marunović; 4 July 1957 (age 68); Mojkovac, Montenegro
- Years active: 1983-present
- Notable work: Petar II Petrović Njegoš
- Website: http://www.cnp.me/onama/ansambl/marunovic-slobodan.htm

Slobodan Marunović (Montenegrin: Slobodan Marunović, Слободан Маруновић: born 4 July 1957), is an actor from Montenegro.

== Biography ==
Marunović was born in Mojkovac, Montenegro. After graduating elementary and grammar school in Danilovgrad, he enrolled in Serbo-Croatian language and literature in Nikšić, Montenegro and Belgrade, Serbia. In the course of his acting career, he has played a great amount of roles in theatre, on film and television.

== Career ==
He played around 100 theatre performances, as a member of the Montenegrin National Theatre since 1982, in the Royal Theatre known as “Zetski dom", Theatre City in Budva, Nikšić Theatre and others.

Monodrama “The last hour of Njegos” written by Slobodan Tomović and directed by Blagota Eraković, which premiered on 19 May 1988, in the Montenegrin National Theatre, has been performed over 1500 times in various cities and countries on all continents of the world. He has performed it on stages around the world: Paris, New York City, Rome, Vienna, Zurich, London, Moscow, Belgrade, Zagreb, Sarajevo, Ljubljana, Stockholm, Tashkent, Samarkand, Toronto, Montreal, Halifax, Chicago, Detroit, San Francisco, Los Angeles, San Pedro, Melbourne, Perth, Sydney, Athens, Cologne, Stuttgart, Karlsruhe, Kostroma.

He has worked in 3 films but his love is poetry, and he has appeared on television to recite "Vito Nikolić, Njegoš, Risto Ratković, Danilo Lompar, Miroslav Djurović, Miro Božović, Jevrem Brković, Aleksandar Leso Ivanović and others, and with songwriter and singer Slobodan Kovačević worked on a project titled Montenegrina Poetry."

== Private life ==
He is married to Ljiljana Marunović. They have a daughter, Andjela and sons Blagota and Danilo. He has participated in hiking adventures on Mount Olympus in Greece, Rila in Bulgaria, Feldberg in Germany, Matterhorn in Switzerland, Mont Blanc in France and in numerous Montenegrin mountains as well. He is collector of books, paintings and sculptures.
