= Sonja Savić =

Serbian actress

- Соња Савић
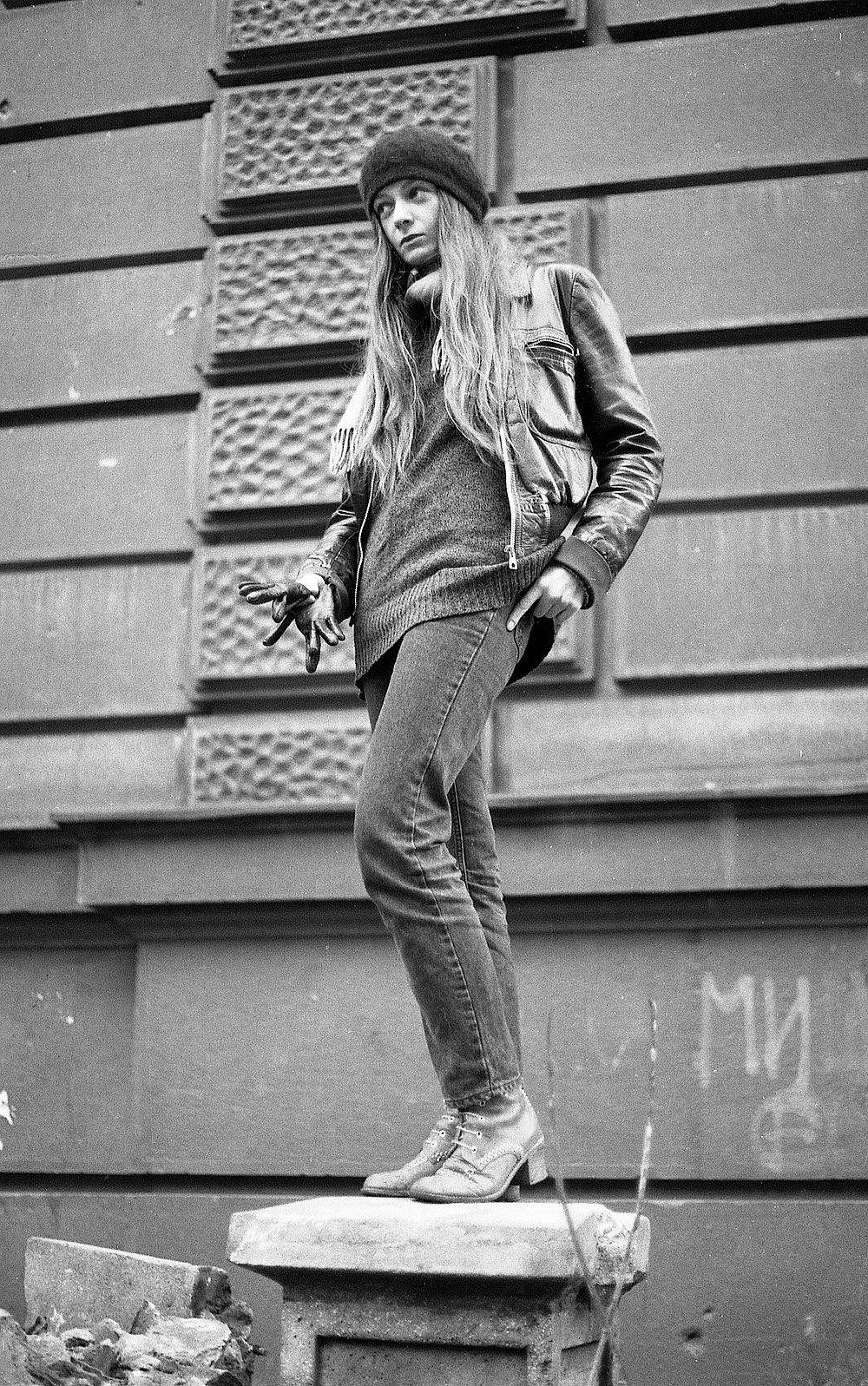
- Savić in 1995
- Born: 15 September 1961; Čačak, PR Serbia, FPR Yugoslavia
- Died: 23 September 2008 (aged 47); Belgrade, Serbia
- Education: Faculty of Dramatic Arts
- Alma mater: University of Arts in Belgrade
- Occupation: Actress
- Years active: 1977–2008

Sonja Savić (Serbian Cyrillic: Соња Савић; 15 September 1961 – 23 September 2008) was a Serbian actress, famous for her husky voice and series of impressive roles in some of the most memorable Yugoslav films of 1980s and 1990s.

She was born in Čačak, Serbia and attended the Faculty of Dramatic Arts in Belgrade, Serbia.

== Personal life ==
Savić was a good friend with members of the band Ekatarina Velika.

Savić never married and had no children. In later years she stated she regrets that decision.

In her later years she became an outspoken critic of the direction the country was taking, in terms of cultural and political values. Politically, she was a progressive.

Sonja appeared in Miroslav Ilić video Voleo sam devojku iz grada.

== Death ==
She died in Belgrade, Serbia; the cause of death was initially reported to be a heroin overdose.

== Filmography ==
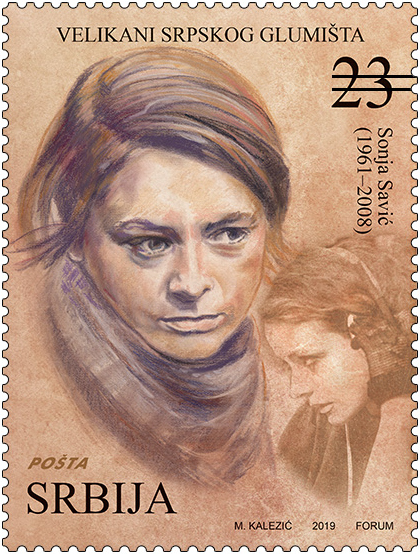
Savić on a 2019 stamp of Serbia

- Leptirov Oblak (Butterfly's Cloud) as Lila, 1977
- Ljubavni život Budimira Trajkovića (Beloved Love) as Girl from Discothèque, 1977
- Lude godine as Lidija, 1978
- Die rote Zora und ihre Bande (The Outsiders of Uskoken Castle) as Zlata, 1979 (TV Series)
- Zvezde koje ne tamne (Stars That Don't Fade) as Sonja, 1980
- Lagani povratak (Easy Comeback), 1981
- Verenica (The Fiancée), 1982
- Živeti kao sav normalan svet (Living Like the Rest of Us), 1982
- Kože (Leathers) as Safija, 1982 (TV Series)
- Četvrtak umesto petka (Thursday Instead of Friday) as Girl, 1982 (TV)
- Nešto između (Something in Between) as Tvigica, 1983
- Karlovački doživljaji 1889 as Milica, 1983 (TV)
- Šećerna vodica (Sugar Water) as Branka Đurić-Dečka, 1983
- Balkanski špijun (Balkan Spy) as Sonja Čvorović, 1984
- Divlja patka (Wild Duck) as Hedviga, 1984 (TV)
- Davitelj protiv davitelja (Strangler vs Strangler) as Sofija, 1984
- U srcu moje plavuše, 1984
- Kamiondžije opet voze (Truckdrivers Rides Again) as Anđelija, 1984
- Uvek sa vama (Always with You) as Fat Girl, 1984 (TV Series)
- Una as Una, 1984
- Formula 1, 1984 (TV Series)
- Gospođica Julija (Miss Julija) as Julija, 1985 (TV)
- Život je lep (Life is Beautiful) as Singer, 1985
- Crna Marija (Black Mary) as Anja, 1986
- Majstor i Šampita as Sonja Marković – Šampita, 1986
- Sekula i njegove žene (Sekula and his Women) as Spasenija, 1986
- Noć punog meseca (Night of a Full Moon) as Sonja, 1986 (TV Series)
- Telefonomanija (Phonemania), 1987 (TV)
- I to se zove sreća (And You Call That Luck), 1987 (TV Series)
- Osuđeni (Sentenced) as Judge's daughter, 1987
- Čavka as Teacher #2, 1988
- Braća po materi (Maternal Halfbrothers) as Anica, 1988
- The Dark Side of the Sun (film), 1988
- Masmediologija na Balkanu as Slavka, 1989
- Kako je propao rokenrol (The Fall of Rock'n'Roll) as Bojana, 1989
- Balkanska perestrojka as Slavka, 1990
- Mi nismo anđeli (We Are Not Angels) as Marta, 1992
- Uvod u drugi život, 1992
- Život i delo Danila Kiša (Life and Literature – Danilo Kiš), 1994 (TV)
- Ni na nebu ni na zemlji, 1994
- Otvorena vrata (Door Opened) as Blonde, 1995 (TV Series)
- Urnebesna tragedija (Tragédie burlesque) as Violeta, 1995
- Ivan, 1997 (TV)
- Tango je tužna misao koja se pleše, 1997
- Senke uspomena (Shadows of Memories) as Theater Cashier, 2000
- Kruh in mleko (Bread and Milk) as Sonja, 2001
- Virtuelna stvarnost (Virtual Reality) as Nina, 2001
- Donau, Duna, Dunaj, Dunav, Dunarea (The Danube) as Tamara, 2003
- Žurka (The Party) as Đina, 2004
- Desperado Tonic as fatal woman – a vampire, 2004
- Od groba do groba (Gravehopping) as Ida, 2005
- Jug jugoistok (South by Southeast), 2005
- Princ od papira as Eva, 2008
- Vratiće se rode as Darinka, 2007 (TV series)
