= Miloš Petrović (composer) =

Serbian composer (1951–2021)

Background information
- Birth name: Miloš Petrović
- Born: October 18, 1952; Belgrade, PR Serbia, FPR Yugoslavia
- Died: November 13, 2010 (aged 58); Belgrade, Serbia
- Genres: Jazz; rock; classical music; Byzantine music; ethnic jazz
- Occupations: Composer; pianist; harpsichordist
- Instrument(s): Piano, harpsichord
- Years active: 1971–2010
- Labels: PGP-RTB, Sorabia Disk, Vertical Jazz, PGP-RTS
- Formerly of: Jazzy; Jakarta

Miloš Petrović (Serbian Cyrillic: Милош Петровић; 18 October 1952 – 13 November 2010) was a Serbian and Yugoslav musician, composer, music educator and writer.

Petrović graduated from the Belgrade Faculty of Music in 1974. From 1974 to 1980 he performed with the jazz group Interaction, and in 1980 he formed the jazz band Jazzy, releasing three albums with the group. Simultaneously, he was a member of the rock group Jakarta, with which he recorded two albums and gained nationwide popularity. He started his career in classical music in 1985, recording an album of harpsichord pieces. After gaining a magister degree from the Belgrade Faculty of Music in 1988, he dedicated himself to composing. He published a number of classical and ethnic jazz albums and took part in several jazz projects.

Petrović was a professor at the Belgrade Faculty of Music, where he taught harpsichord and chamber music. He published two novels, a book of short stories and a book of essays.

== Biography ==
=== Early career ===
Miloš Petrović was born in 1952 in Belgrade municipality Zemun. One of his first works was a chamber opera based on Jean Cocteau's novel Les Enfants terribles, which he composed at the age 19. He graduated from the piano department of the Belgrade Faculty of Music in 1974. During the same year, he started his career playing in the jazz group Interaction, led by saxophonist Paul Pignon. He performed with Interaction until 1980.

=== Jazzy and Jakarta ===
In 1980, Petrović formed the jazz band Jazzy with bassist Rade Bulatović and percussionist Nenad Jelić. With Jazzy he recorded the albums, Jazzy (1983) and Wake Up and Jazzy (1986), both released through PGP-RTB record label. They self-released the album Istorija Vizantije (History of the Byzantine Empire) on audio cassette. The cassette was given to the visitors of their concert held in Belgrade's Students' Cultural Center on 22 January 1990. These recordings would be reissued on CD in 2012. The disc was given with an issue of the world music magazine Etnoumlje. A number of musicians from Belgrade worked with Jazzy during the nine years of its activity. The group split up in 1990.

Simultaneously with his work in Jazzy, Petrović was a member of the rock band Jakarta. He joined Jakarta in 1983, recording two albums with them, the synth-funk oriented Maske za dvoje (Masks for Two, 1984), which brought them nationwide popularity, and power pop-oriented Bomba u grudima (Bomb in the Chest, 1986). He remained the member of Jakarta until its dissolution in 1988.

=== Solo career and collaborations ===
Petrović started his solo career in 1985, with the album Dela Baha i Ramoa (The Works of Bach and Rameau), on which he played harpsichord. During the same year, with violinist Nenad Milošević, flutist Svetlana Tošić and cellist Tešman Živanović he recorded the album Baroque Trio Sonatas, featuring pieces by Vivaldi, Telemann, Loeillet and Bach. Three years later, he gained magister degree from the Belgrade Faculty of Music.

In 1991, he released the album Istorija Vizantije No.1 (History of the Byzantine Empire No.1), which featured his compositions for prepared piano inspired by Byzantine music. The album inner sleeve featured accompanying short stories written by Petrović. In 1993, with percussionist Veljko Nikolić, better known by his stage name Papa Nick, he released the avant-garde jazz album Levantinci (Levantines). In 1994, he released the ethnic jazz album Istorija Vizantije 2, which featured numerous guest musicians: Rade Bulatović (bass), Vladeta Kandić (accordion), Bata Božanić (bass), Luka Bošković (drums), Nenad Petrović (saxophone), Papa Nick (percussion), and others. In 1996, he published the double album Srpska muzika za čembalo (Serbian Music for Harpsichord), with harpsichord pieces inspired by traditional music of Serbia. During the same year, with Papa Nick and Greek musician Floros Floridis he recorded the album Syrtis Major. In 1998, he released two albums with the band Južni Kvartet (Southern Quartet), The Past Continuous and Around Balkan Midnight. Južni Kvartet consisted of Petrović (piano, prepared piano), Milivoje "Mića" Marković (alto saxophone, clarinet), Papa Nick (percussion, vocals), and Vladimir Nikić (bass, accordion). Petrović authored all the tracks on their two albums. At the end of 1990s, he participated in the Levant Music project, consisting of him, Papa Nick, bassist Mihajlo "Miša" Blam and vocalist Vladana Marković. They released the album Rolling Sun (2000), recorded on their concert in Belgrade Ethnographic Museum. In 2001, he released his last album, Levantino, which he recorded with the Bertollino string quartet, consisting of Katarina Milenković (violine), Aleksandar Gajić (violine), Đorđe Pantelić (viola) and Tešman Živanović (cello). The album featured material composed by Petrović and Gajić.

=== Other activities ===
Petrović taught harpsichord and chamber music at the Belgrade Faculty of Music.

He published two novels, Žitije Mardarija Monaha (Life of Mardarije the Monk, 1992) and Mihajlo iz Peći (Mihajlo from Peć, 1997), and a book of short stories entitled Levant nad Levantom (Levant over Levant, 1996). In 2009, he composed a cantata based on Mihajlo iz Peći. In 2010, just several weeks before his death, his book of essays on jazz entitled Dlanom o stopalo (Palm across the Foot) was published.

=== Death ===
Petrović died in Belgrade on 13 November 2010, after long illness.

== Discography ==
=== With Jazzy ===
==== Studio albums ====
- Jazzy (1983)
- Wake Up and Jazzy (1986)
- Istorija Vizantije (1990)

=== With Jakarta ===
==== Studio albums ====
- Maske za dvoje (1984)
- Bomba u grudima (1986)

==== Singles ====
- "Amerika" / "Put u bajano" (1983)
- "Spiritus" / "Problem" (1984)
- "Osvojiću svet" / "Osvojiću svet – Instrumental" (1985)

=== Solo ===
==== Studio albums ====
- Dela Baha i Ramoa (1985)
- Baroque Trio Sonatas (1985)
- Istorija Vizantije No.1 (1991)
- Levantinci (1993)
- Istorija Vizantije 2 (1994)
- Srpska muzika za čembalo (1996)
- Syrtis Major (1996)
- Levantino (2001)

==== Compilation albums ====
- Istorija Vizantije 1 i 2 (2019)

=== With Južni kvartet ===
==== Studio albums ====
- The Past Continuous (1998)
- Around Balkan Midnight (1998)

=== With Levant Music ===
==== Studio albums ====
- Rolling Sun (2000)

== Bibliography ==
=== Fiction ===
- Žitije Mardarija Monaha (1991)
- Levant nad Levantom (1996)
- Mihajlo iz Peći (1997)

=== Nonfiction ===
- Dlanom o stopalo (2010)
