= Taško Načić =

Serbian actor

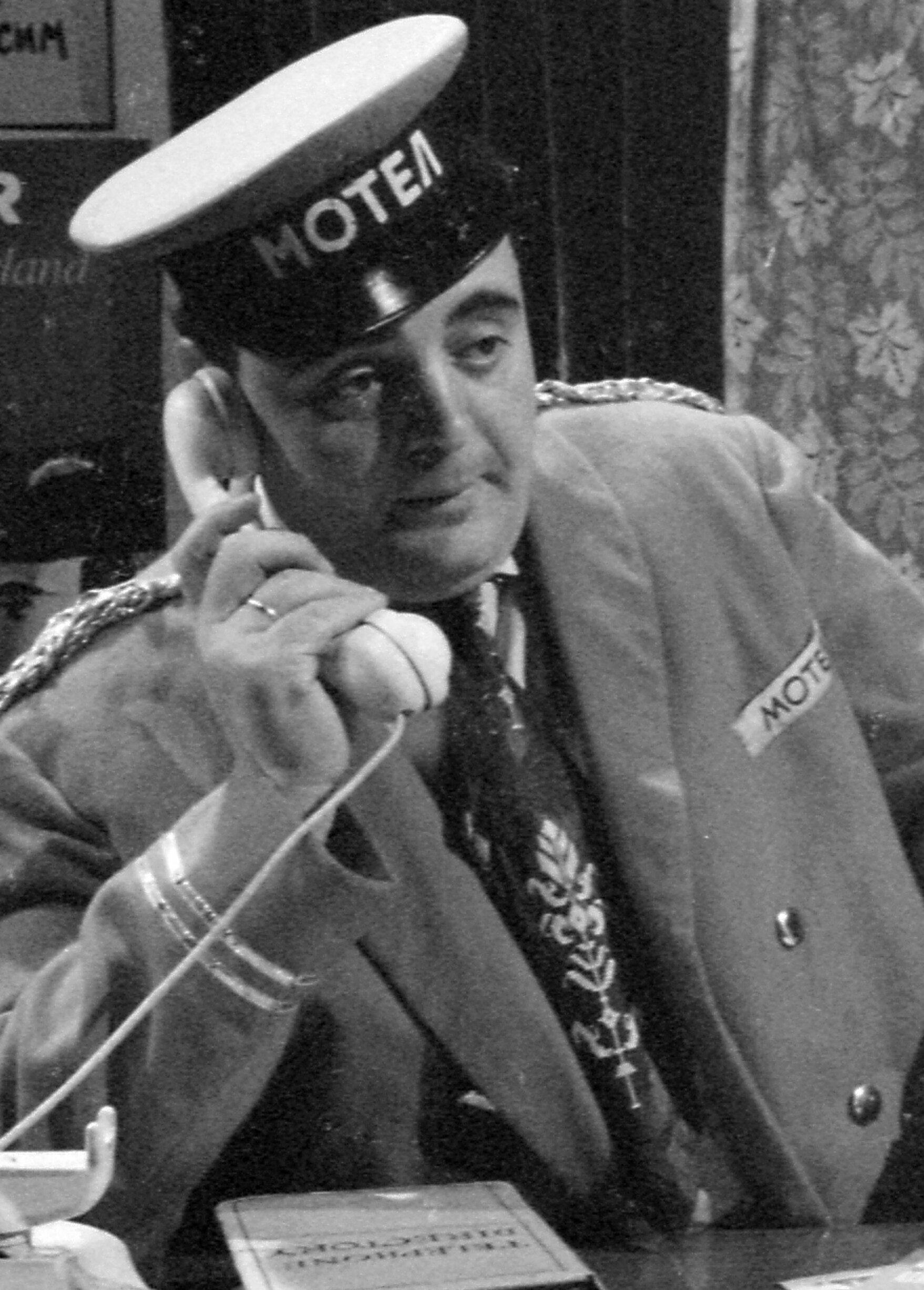
- Born: 7 April 1934; Kruševac, Kingdom of Yugoslavia
- Died: 26 March 1993 (aged 58); Belgrade, FR Yugoslavia
- Years active: 1954–1993

Taško Načić (Serbian Cyrillic: Ташко Начић; 7 April 1934 – 26 March 1993) was a Serbian actor.

== Early life ==
Načić's paternal family was of Aromanian descent from Zaječar. He studied acting at The Faculty of Dramatic Arts in Belgrade, where he graduated in 1956.

== Theatre ==
In 1954 he became a member of National Theatre in Belgrade, where he acted in plays Stanoje Glavaš and Gospođa Ministarka. Soon after that he went to theater Boško Buha and then to the newly founded Atelje 212 where he remained until his death. He acted in numerous plays such as: Arsenik i stare čipke (Arsenic and Old Lace), Kartoteka, Kralj Ibi (King Ubu), Viktor ili Deca na vlasti (Victor, or Power to the Children), Kafanica, sudnica, ludnica, Kape dole (Caps Down), Galeb (The Seagull), Mark i šuma gusta, Rado ide Srbin u vojnike (Gladly the Serb joins the Army), Maratonci trče počasni krug, Purpurno ostrvo, Radovan III, Čudo u Šarganu, Ne pucaj, bre (monodrama), Ožalošćena porodica, Mat'rijalisti, Propast carstva srpskoga, Veliko i malo, Čaplja, Karijera, Pariska komuna, Svećar.

== Films ==
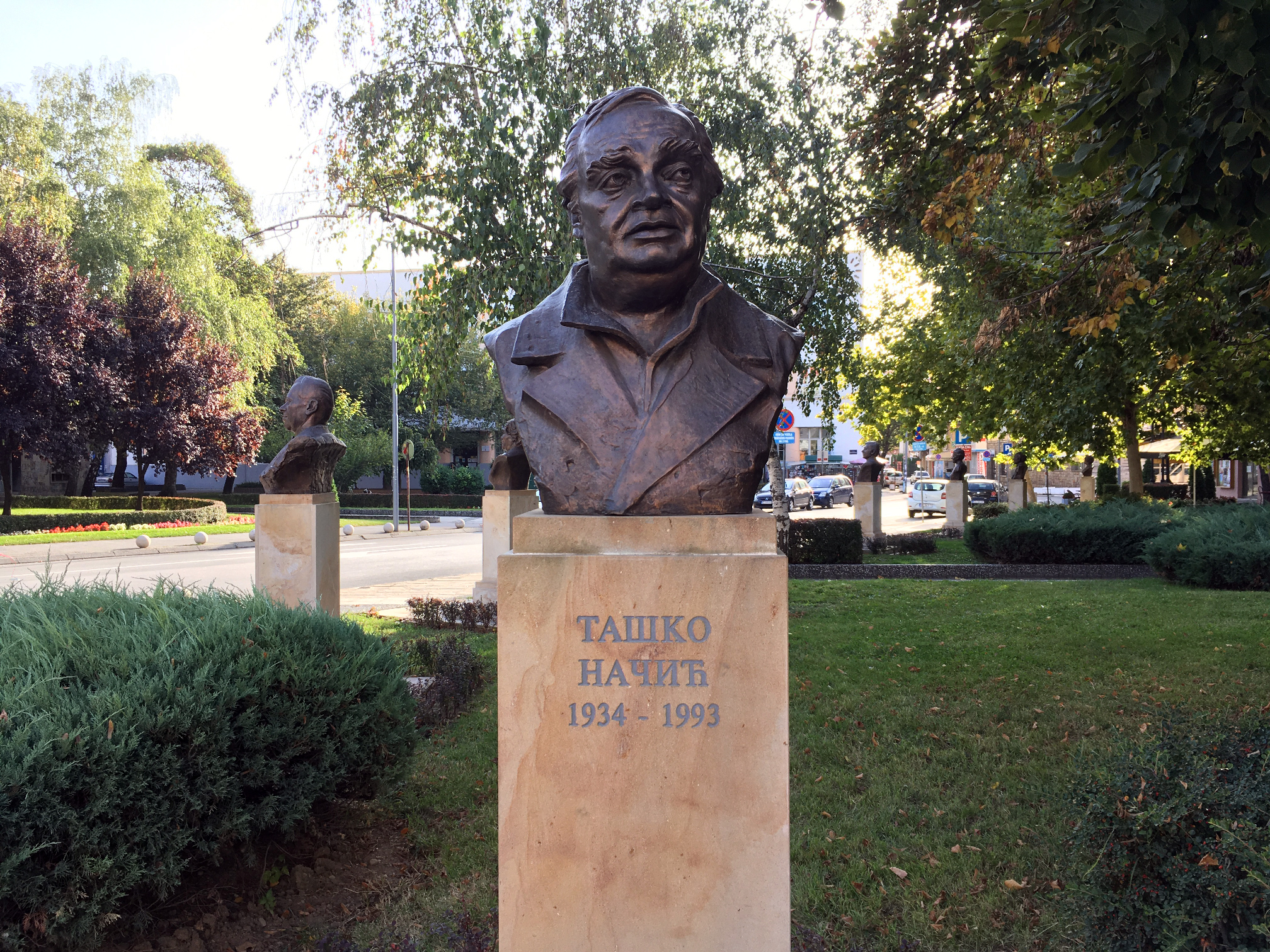
Bust of Načić Kruševac

In movies, he first appeared in Vojislav Nanović's movie Bolje je Umeti in 1960, and after that in Bokseri idu u raj, Bubašinter, Majstor i Margarita, Kičma, Ko to tamo peva (Who's That Singing Over There), Halo, taksi!, Davitelj protiv davitelja, Maturanti, Sulude godine, Tajna manastirske rakije, Tesna koža 4 and Juriš na skupštinu.

He also played in numerous TV series and TV movies, such as Diplomci and Bolji život.
