= Slobodan Šijan =

Serbian film director and screenwriter

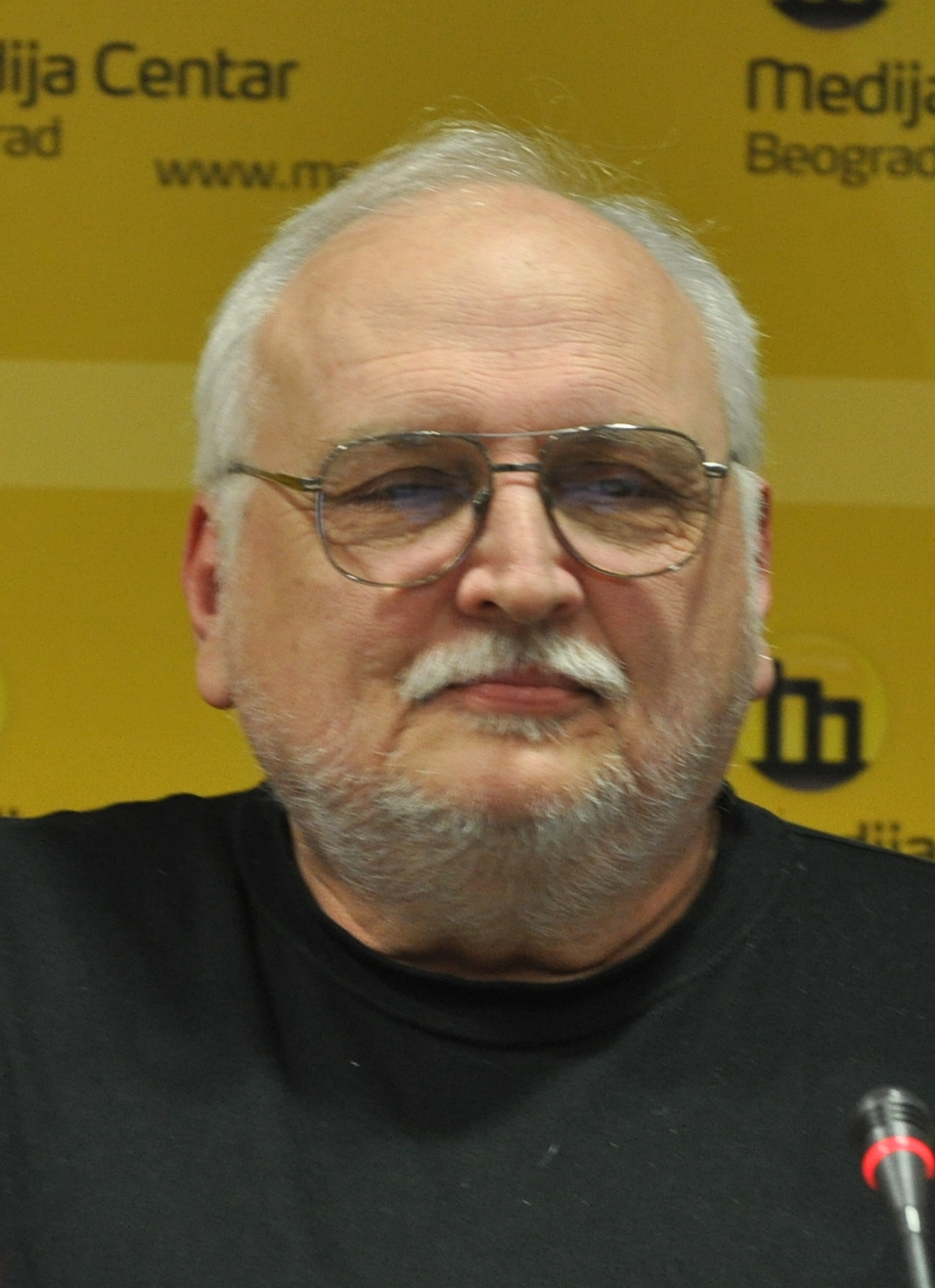
- Slobodan Šijan in April 2014
- Born: 16 November 1946 (age 79); Belgrade, PR Serbia, FPR Yugoslavia
- Occupation: Director
- Years active: 1980–present
- Known for: Ko to tamo peva, Maratonci trče počasni krug, Davitelj protiv davitelja

Slobodan Šijan (Serbian Cyrillic: Слободан Шијан, pronounced [slɔbɔ̌dan ʃîjaːn]; born 16 November 1946) is a Serbian film director.

== Biography ==
Šijan was born in Belgrade, Yugoslavia. He graduated from the Fine Arts Academy in Belgrade, and then enrolled in Belgrade's Academy of Theater Faculty of Dramatic Arts in 1970. He directed a number of television films as well as experimental and short films during the 1970s. From 1976 to 1979, he published a series of fanzines which according to him were made "out of frustration" in between his experimentation and attempts to break into professional cinema.

His first full-length feature Ko to tamo peva, directed in collaboration with writer Dušan Kovačević and cinematographer Božidar Nikolić, was released in 1980 and became a box-office hit. 1982's Maratonci trče počasni krug, also achieved considerable commercial success.

Over the coming years Šijan directed two more notable films, How I Was Systematically Destroyed by an Idiot (Kako sam sistematski uništen od idiota) and Strangler vs. Strangler (Davitelj protiv davitelja).

In 2021, he was selected the Friend of Slovenian Cinema at the 2021 Festival of Slovenian Film.

== Filmography ==
| Year | Film | Director | Writer | Producer | Awards / Notes |
|---|---|---|---|---|---|
| 1980 | Who's Singin' Over There? (Ko to tamo peva) | Yes | No | No | Bronze Arena at Pula Film Festival |
| 1982 | The Marathon Family (Maratonci trče počasni krug) | Yes | No | No | Jury prize at Montréal World Film Festival |
| 1983 | How I Was Systematically Destroyed by an Idiot (Kako sam sistematski uništen od idiota) | Yes | Yes | No | |
| 1984 | Strangler vs. Strangler (Davitelj protiv davitelja) | Yes | Yes | No | |
| 1988 | Cognac (Tajna manastirske rakije) | Yes | No | No | |
| 2003 | Poor Little Hamsters (Siroti mali hrčki 2010) | Yes | No | No | |
| 2007 | Save Our Souls (S. O. S. - Spasite naše duše) | Yes | No | No | |
| 2024 | God Be with Us (Budi Bog s nama) | Yes | Yes | No | Filming |

TV work

- Gradilište (1979) (TV)
- Ing. ugostiteljstva (1979) (short)
- Kost od mamuta (1979) (TV)
- Najlepša soba (1978) (TV)
- Šta se dogodilo sa Filipom Preradovićem (1977) (TV movie)
- Pohvala svetu (1976) (TV short)
- Sve što je bilo lepo (1976) (TV movie)
- Sunce te čuva (1975) (TV short)
