= Božidar Nikolić =

Serbian film director (1942–2021)

- Born: 1 January 1942; Nikšić, Montenegro
- Died: 13 May 2021 (aged 79); Belgrade, Serbia
- Occupation(s): Film director Cinematographer

Božidar "Bota" Nikolić (Serbian Cyrillic: Божидар Бота Николић; 1 January 1942 – 13 May 2021) was a Serbian and Montenegrin film director and screenwriter.

He directed the films Balkan Spy, The Dark Side of the Sun, Three Tickets to Hollywood, In the Name of Father and Son, and Balkan Brothers.
