= Indexovo radio pozorište =

Indexovo radio pozorište (Index's radio theater) was a Serbian radio comedy programme led by Slobodan Bićanin, Dragoljub Ljubičić, and Branislav Petrušević, that eventually evolved into a satirical theater troupe. They were formed around state-owned Beograd 202 radio where they had a weekly show on Sundays. Their comedy program was diverse, from phone call jokes to various songs about Slobodan Milosevic's regime in Yugoslavia, reflecting political problems between the Serbian and Albanian population in Kosovo and the NATO bombing.

== Famous plays ==
- Ne ostavljajte me samog dok himna svira
- Svet ili ništa
- Izbori jer ste vi to tražili
- Istočno od rajha
- Brat i mir
- Tamo daleko je sunce
- the song "El Kondor pada"
