= The End Band =

- Origin: Vienna, Austria
- Genres: Indie pop
- Years active: 2009–present
- Labels: ZITA Records
- Members: David Rötzer (drums); Tobias Holzgruber (violin, organetta); Gabriel Schett (bass); Matthäus Maier (vocals, guitar, violin); Matthias Stockenhuber (guitar)
- Website: Official Site

The End Band is an Alternative, Indie pop band from Vienna, Austria, which was founded in 2009 and soon became a well-known act in the Viennese independent scene.

Their first EP Let My Words Protect You was released in December 2010 and was highly regarded by local newspapers such as Falter and featured by the major national ORF radio station FM4, which appointed The End Band to "Band of Month of March 2011" and placed their songs in rotation.

In February 2013, The End Band released their debut-album, Babysounds, on ZITA Records, it was produced by Alexander Wieser, frontman of Deckchair Orange. The record was put out as limited edition on vinyl and as digital version and was again appreciated by the media, including FM4, German music-blog Rote Raupe or the biggest Austrian newspaper Kronen Zeitung.

The album single "Fury" came up to position 12 in the Austrian Indie Chart.

== Discography ==
=== Studio work ===
- Let My Words Protect You EP (2010)
- Babysounds LP (2013)

== Music videos ==
- "Ablepsia" (March 2012)
- "Fury" (January 2013)
