= Strangler vs. Strangler =

- The DVD release cover
- Directed by: Slobodan Šijan
- Written by: Slobodan Šijan; Nebojša Pajkić
- Starring: Taško Načić; Srđan Šaper; Sonja Savić; Nikola Simić
- Music by: Srđan Šaper; Vuk Kulenović
- Distributed by: Centar film
- Release date: 1984
- Running time: 93 minutes
- Country: Yugoslavia
- Language: Serbian

Strangler vs. Strangler (Serbo-Croatian: Davitelj protiv davitelja) is a 1984 Yugoslav film featuring elements of horror comedy, thriller and horror.

The film is set in Belgrade during the 1980s. A middle-aged flower seller becomes a serial killer, targeting girls who refuse to buy his products. His motivation is the sadistic punishment inflicted on him by his domineering mother for the failed sales. An inept police inspector is increasingly obsessed with capturing the killer. A rock singer turns into a copycat killer, killing his wife during their honeymoon and putting the blame on the original killer, leading to a confrontation between the two killers.

== Plot ==
In the mid-1980s Belgrade finally gets its first serial killer: an awkward carnations seller named Pera Mitić (Taško Načić). Mitić is an overweight 48-year-old man still living with his aging mother—an unusual relationship with numerous Oedipean overtones. His mother often punishes him when he does not sell any of the carnation flowers. His punishments include kneeling on nutshells while being slapped by his mother or being locked in the water tank. This is the reason why he starts killing every girl who refuses to buy his flowers. Mitić's character can be compared to Norman Bates's character and relationship with his mother.

After the first murder, mostly incompetent Belgrade police inspector Ognjen Strahinjić (Nikola Simić) starts the investigation. His attempt at catching the strangler by employing an undercover agent, Rodoljub Jovanović (Branislav Zeremski), ends up in tragedy. Strahinjić himself is a loner living only with his cat George, who is his best friend. He is a short man, with a thin moustache and is similar to Inspector Clouseau from the Blake Edwards's The Pink Panther series. The plot becomes even more complicated when the strangler-obsessed rock star Spiridon Kopicl (Srđan Šaper) records the song "Bejbi, bejbi" ("Baby, Baby"), with his band VIS Simboli, dedicated to the strangler, which immediately becomes a nationwide hit.

Mitić, having heard the song, becomes delighted; he even strangled his own mother in order to hear it on the TV. While Mitić's number of victims becomes bigger, Kopicl is focused on Sofija (Sonja Savić) who is a host of a popular musical show on the radio. While attempting to strangle Sofija, Mitić gets on his way and while attacking her Sofija bites his ear in self-defence. Kopicl gets the credit of a savior and a hero and marries Sofija.

On their honeymoon, in the climax of his obsession, Kopicl strangles Sofija while Mitić, dressed as his mother, observes. Mitić then enters the room and asks for his ear. Kopicl runs to an abandoned building where, after a struggle, hangs Mitić who bit his ear. In the end all of the crimes, including Sofija's death, are credited to the late Mitić. Kopicl, while getting his ear bitten hears a melody on which he composed a symphony inspired by the crime and, after the death of his father, marries his attractive stepmother.

== Cast ==
- Taško Načić as Pera Mitić
- Nikola Simić as Inspector Ognjen Strahinjić
- Srđan Šaper as Spiridon Kopicl
- Rahela Ferari as Pera's mother
- Sonja Savić as Sofija Mačkić
- Radmila Savićević as Mica Mojsilović, an eye witness
- María Baxa as Natalija
- Pavle Minčić as Dr. Dobrica Kopicl, Spiridon's father
- Žika Milenković as Inspector Gane
- Branislav Zeremski as Rodoljub Jovanović
- Dragana Ćirić as a girl
- Dijana Sporčić as Evgenija Poslisković
- Jelisaveta Sablić as Miss Dobrila Skara
- Đorđe Nenadović as Impressio Oskar (as George Heston)
- Dobrica Jovanović as Sofija's father
- Velibor Miljković as a punk

== External links and references ==
- Strangler vs. Strangler at IMDb
- Movie critique (Serbian source).
