= Srđan Šaper =

Serbian singer

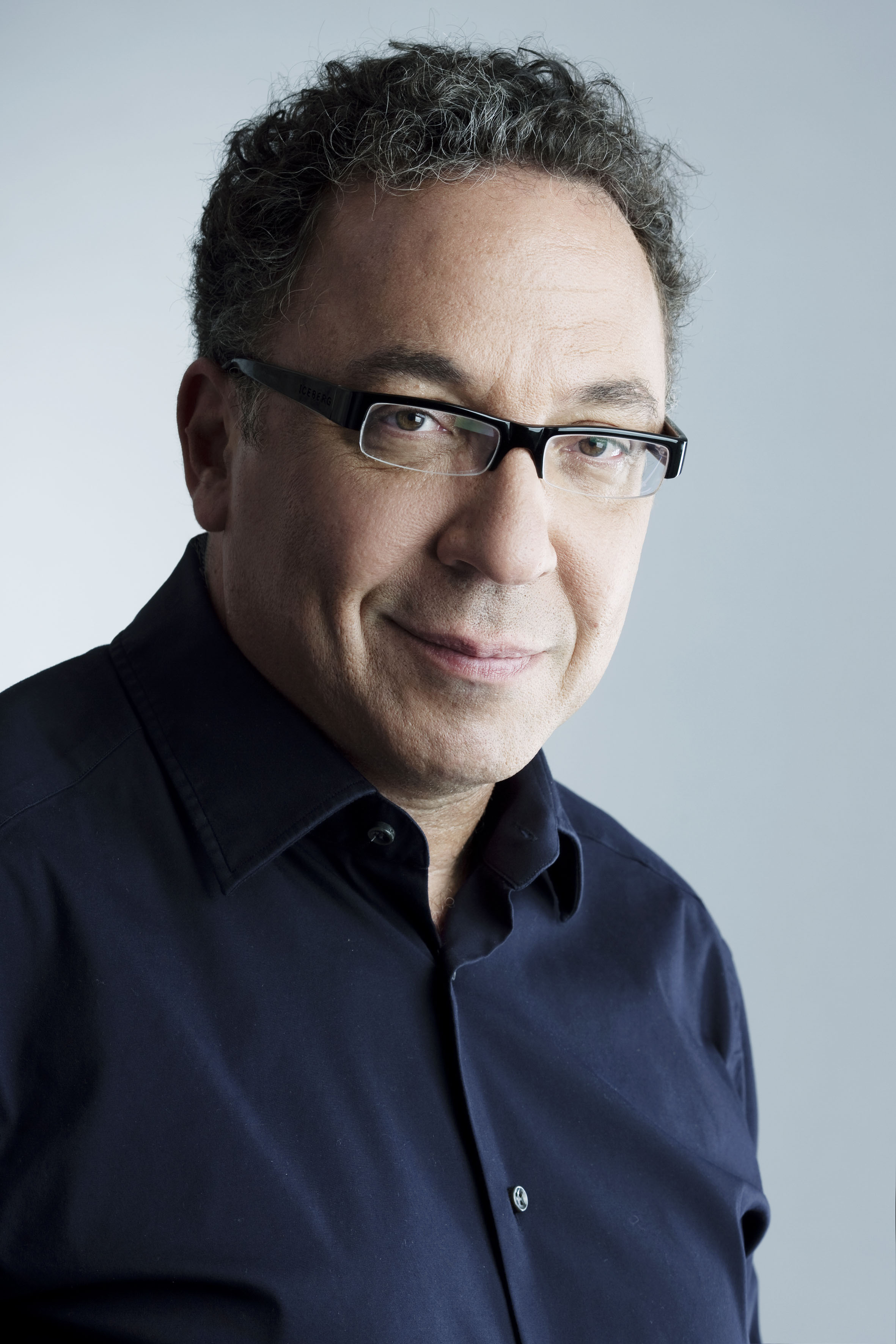
- Born: 9 October 1958 (age 67); Belgrade, PR Serbia, FPR Yugoslavia
- Occupations: Musician; Film direction Manager
- Parent(s): Ljiljana Šaper; Radomir Šaper

Srđan Šaper (Serbian Cyrillic: Срђан Шапер; born 9 October 1958) is a Serbian businessman and former musician. He is the founder of I&F Grupa. He was also a founder and a member of the Yugoslav new wave band Idoli in the 1980s.

== Musical career ==
=== VIS Dečaci and Idoli ===
Šaper became interested in forming a musical group with his friend Nebojša Krstić and at a party during late 1979 he made a deal with his close high school friend Vlada Divljan to start playing together. Šaper and Krstić were to play guitar and Divljan was to be the drummer. The band was called Dečaci (The Boys).

=== Post Idoli career ===
In 1996 both Šaper and Krstić appeared on the Akcija self-titled debut on the track "7 dana". Since then, they have not recorded nor performed live, and in 1999 the songs "Razvod 1999" and "Parada" appeared on the various artists compilation Rock 'n' roll – "Ravno do dna" i druge, manje-više, čudnovate pjesme (1980–'89).

== Discography ==
=== With Nebojša Krstić ===
==== Studio albums ====
- Poslednja mladost u Jugoslaviji (1987)

==== Singles ====
- "Razvod 1999" / "Parada" (1999)

=== With Dobrovoljno Pevačko Društvo ===
- Nedelja na Duhove (1995)

=== With Akcija ===
- Akcija (1996) – guest on the track "7 dana" ("7 Days")
