= X Factor Adria =

Pan-Former Yugoslav series

- Judges: Željko Joksimović; Aleksandra Kovač (Season 2); Massimo Savić (Season 2); Tonči Huljić (Season 2); Emina Jahović (Season 1); Kiki Lesendrić (Season 1) Kristina Kovač
- Countries of origin: Serbia; Macedonia; Montenegro; Bosnia and Herzegovina; Croatia (2015)
- No. of series: 2

Production
- Production locations: Belgrade, Serbia
- Running time: 60–240 minutes

Original release
- Network: Sitel (2013–15); Prva, RTL, RTVFBiH, RTRS (2015); Pink (2013–2014)
- Release: 29 October 2013 – 21 June 2015

Related
- The X Factor

X Factor Adria, usually referred simply as X Faktor, was a pan-Former Yugoslav adaptation of The X Factor franchise in the Adria region. It covered Serbia, Montenegro, Bosnia and Herzegovina, Macedonia and – as of Season 2 – Croatia as well, making the show regional. The second season was hosted by Antonija Blaće, Aleksandar Radojičić and Snežana Velkov. Like the original British version of the series, X Factor Adria aimed to find new singing talents contested by aspiring singers drawn from public auditions.

== Format ==
=== Stages ===
The show consists of several phases: auditions, bootcamp, judge's houses and live shows. During the auditions and bootcamp phases of the competition, judges as a group decide on the fate of the contestants with a majority vote. After the bootcamp, acts are split into four different groups and one of the judges is assigned to mentor each of the acts in the group. During the judge's houses stage, judges are accompanied with guest judges and they choose the acts from their category who they want to take to the live shows. Live shows are the final stage of the competition and the first stage where public get their say by voting to keep their favourite in and eventually win.

==== Auditions ====
The first part of the selection process are the auditions. Potential contestants apply for a place at the auditions either online or via text message. Those invited to the auditions perform in front of the producers before some are selected to audition in front of the judges. Producers' auditions are sometimes referred to as pre-auditions.

The first series also featured a mobile video booth where people could audition without previously applying. The booth was set up on the grounds of Petrovaradin Fortress during the Exit festival.

After the pre-auditions, producers call back the acts they want to perform in front of the judges. The judges auditions are the first part of the series that is broadcast. During the auditions, acts introduce themselves and perform in front of the judges. After an act performs, the judges give feedback and vote. Acts need three or four "yes" responses from the judges to get through to the next stage of the competition: Bootcamp.

==== Bootcamp ====
Bootcamp is the second stage where the acts who made it through are called back to perform again. In bootcamp acts can sometimes face challenges such as performing with other acts, choreography, and sing-offs. Judges as a group select 24 acts, six of each category, to progress to judges houses. When judges and producers feel like there is a lack of good groups, a group sometimes can be formed of the solo acts that did not make it through in their own category. After each of the category is formed, a judge is assigned as mentor to the category.

==== Judge's houses ====
The acts who have been selected in bootcamp perform in front of a single judge one more time. That judge is usually accompanied with a guest judge who is there to help them make the decision of selecting the acts who will represent him and the category in the live shows. Even though the phase is called judge's houses, it is rare for the judges to have acts perform in their actual ones.

==== Live shows ====
The live shows are the final stage of the competition. In this phase acts perform live in front of an audience and the public votes for their favourite. Each week has a different theme. After all the acts perform and the public votes have been counted, the safe acts are announced, leaving two acts in "the bottom two". The bottom two perform one more time and the judges vote on the act they want to save or send home. The saved/eliminated act is decided by majority vote, in case the judges tie the vote the act who leaves the competition is decided by the public votes that were counted earlier. In the final, judges have no say as the winner is decided solely on the public vote.

=== Categories ===
According to the series' producers, the first season featured four categories: Girls, Boys, Groups, and "Second chance". The latter includes contestants who are over 30 years old and previously took part in other talent shows. When the show started broadcasting, the producers decided to drop the "Second chance" category and went with "Over 27s".

=== Judges and presenters ===
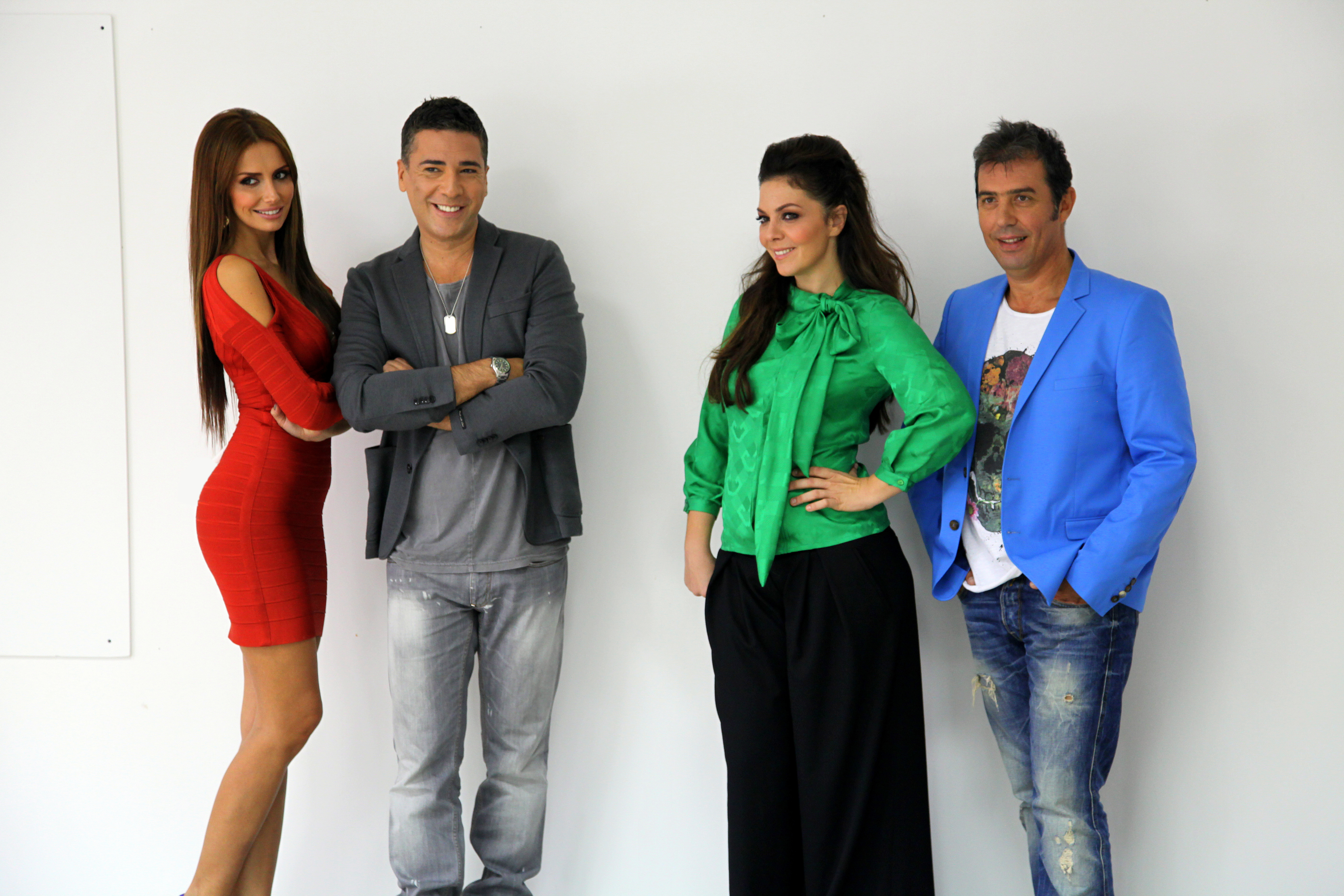
2013 judging panel

The first season was judged by Emina Jahović, Kristina Kovač, Kiki Lesendrić, and Željko Joksimović. Kovač and Joksimović were the first to be announced, while both Jahović and Lesendrić were announced one day later.

After the first two episodes aired, Bane Jevtić was announced to be replaced after hosting only the first eight episodes, but the producers denied this claim. At night of the first live show, it was reported that a new host was going to replace him, keeping in secret who it was going to be. It was revealed that Slavko Kalezić would take the role of the host. The day after the first live show it was announced that Slavko would be replaced as well.

In February 2015, it was announced that judges of the second season of X Factor Adria would be Željko Joksimović, Tonči Huljić, Massimo Savić, and Aleksandra Kovač.

== Guests ==
In Season 2, guess judges at the judge's houses were Nina Badric at Masimo's house and Mirko Vukomanović at Željko's house, Kaliopi at Aleksandra's house and Petar Grašo at Tonči's house.

== Series ==
To date, both series have finished broadcasting as summarised below. Contestant in (or mentor of) "Boys" category
Contestant in (or mentor of) "Girls" category
Contestant in (or mentor of) "Over 27s" category
Contestant in (or mentor of) "Groups" category

Series	Start	Finish	Winner	Runner-up	Third place	Main judges	Winning mentor
One	October 29, 2013	March 22, 2014	Daniel Kajmakoski	Tamara Milanović	Maid Hećimović	Emina Jahović; Kristina Kovač; Kiki Lesendrić; Željko Joksimović	Željko Joksimović
Two	March 22, 2015	June 21, 2015	Amel Ćurić	Boban Mojsovski	Iva Ćurić	Željko Joksimović; Aleksandra Kovač; Massimo Savić; Tonči Huljić	Massimo Savić

== Judges' categories and their contestants ==
In each season, each judge is allocated a category to mentor and chooses three acts to progress to the live shows. This table shows, for each season, which category each judge was allocated and which acts he or she put through to the live shows.

Key:

– Winning judge/category. Winners are in bold, eliminated contestants in small font.

Season	Emina Jahović	Kristina Kovač	Kiki Lesendrić	Željko Joksimović
One	**Boys**; Lukijan Ivanović; Aleksa Perović; Haris Ćato	**Groups**; Doktori; 4U; H2O	**Girls**; Tamara Milanović; Ilma Karahmet; Aleksandra Brković; Aleksandra Sekulić	**Over 27s** **Daniel Kajmakoski**; Maid Hećimović; Maja Novaković; Mladen Lukić
Season	Massimo Savić	Aleksandra Kovač	Tonči Huljić	Željko Joksimović
Two	**Over 27**; **Amel Ćurić**; Danijela Večerinović; Jelena Đurić; Nikola Marjanović	**Boys**; Boban Mojsovski; Antonio Krištofić; David Temelkov; Milan Bukilić; Ilija Mihailović	**Groups**; Highway; 9 Control; Adnan & Tarik; AnđeliNE; Infinitas	**Girls**; Iva Ćurić; Magdalena Bogić; Katarina Simić

== See also ==
- Prvi glas Srbije
- Operacija Trijumf
- Idol
- Star Search Croatia
- Hrvatski Idol
