= X Factor Adria series 2 =

X Factor Adria
- Series 2
- Hosted by: Antonija Blaće; Snežana Velkov; Aleksandar Radojičić; Nikolina Pišek (Live shows)
- Judges: Massimo Savić; Tonči Huljić; Željko Joksimović; Aleksandra Kovač
- Winner: Amel Ćurić
- Runner-up: Boban Mojsovski

Release
- Original network: 1Prva • RTL • Sitel • RTRS • FTV

Series chronology
- ← Previous; Series 1

X Factor Adria is a Balkan production of international talent show franchise of The X Factor. The Adria edition of the show covers Bosnia and Herzegovina, Croatia, North Macedonia, Montenegro and Serbia
After the first series the original production company lost their licence which was then acquired by Prva, Serbian broadcaster and production company. It was revealed that Croatian broadcaster RTL was interested in bringing the show to Croatia as well, and that would broadcast it.
In late February 2015 it was announced that Aleksandra Kovač, Massimo, Tonči Huljić and Željko Joksimović would judge the series. Shortly after that Antonija Blaće, Sneža Velkov and Aleksandar Radojičić would take the roles of show hosts. The season premiered on 22 March 2015.

== Selection process ==
=== Auditions ===
Contestants were able to apply via text messages or by filling up the form online. Pre-auditions were held from 2 February, until 15 February in Skopje, Podgorica, Split, Zagreb, Banja Luka, Sarajevo, Novi Sad, and Belgrade. During the pre-auditions more than 11,500 contestants performed for the show producers.

=== Bootcamp ===
Bootcamp was the second phase of the competition. There were two episodes of Bootcamp. The first one was with the boys and over 27s and the other was with the girls and groups. Each judge had to pick six acts to the judges houses. The six-seat challenge involved successful contestants being offered one of "six seats", representing places at the judges' houses stage of the competition. However, if a judge had already chosen six acts for their category, they could replace them if they preferred a later act.

The 24 acts that progressed to the judges houses:

- Boys: Milan Bukilić, Antonio Krištofić, Ilija Mihailović, Boban Mojsovski, David Temelkov, Siniša Vidović
- Girls: Marija Belada, Magdalena Bogić, Iva Ćurić, Antonia Dora Pleško, Katarina Simić, Tijana Vlajković
- Over 27s: Amel Ćurić, Jelena Đurić, Almir Ismaili, Srđan Lazić, Nikola Marjanović, Danijela Večerinović
- Groups: 9 Control, Adnan & Tarik, AnđeliNE, Highway, Infinitas, U La La

=== Judges' houses ===
Summary of judges' houses
Judge	Category	Location	Assistant	Contestants eliminated	Second Chance contestant
Huljić	Groups	Sremska Kamenica, Serbia	Petar Grašo	Adnan & Tarik, Highway, U La La	Adnan & Tarik, Highway
Joksimović	Girls	Padej, Serbia	Mirko Vukomanović	Marija Belada, Antonia Dora Pleško, Tijana Vlajković	—N/a
Kovač	Boys	Belgrade, Serbia	Kaliopi	Milan Bukilić, Boban Mojsovski, Siniša Vidović	Boban Mojsovski, Milan Bukilić
Savić	Over 27s	Belgrade, Serbia	Nina Badrić	Almir Ismaili, Srđan Lazić, Danijela Večerinović	Danijela Večerinović

==== Second chance ====
At the end of the first Judges' houses episode it was announced that the public would be given a chance to bring back a contestant that was eliminated and therefore did not make it to their respective judges' final three. After the votes have been cast and counted, the act with the most votes will come back on the first live show and stay in the competition alongside other 12 contestants estasts. After the second performance on the first live show it was announced that Adnan & Tarik had won the second chance. However, at the end of the first live show it was announced that Highway, Milan Bukilić and Boban Mojskovski got a second chance too. Towards the end of the third live show, it was announced that Danijela Večerinović will be the fifth act to get a second chance.

== Contestants ==
Key:

– Winner
– Runner-up
– Third place

Category (mentor)	Acts				
Boys (Kovač)	David Temelkov	Antonio Krištofić	Boban Mojsovski	Ilija Mihailović	Milan Bukilić
Girls (Joksimović)	Magdalena Bogić	Iva Ćurić	Katarina Simić		
Over 27s (Savić)	Amel Ćurić	Jelena Đurić	Nikola Marjanović	Danijela Večerinović	
Groups (Huljić)	9 Control	Adnan & Tarik	Highway	AnđeliNE	Infinitas

== Live shows ==
The first live show episode is set to be broadcast on 17 May 2015.

=== Result summary ===
Colour key

–	Contestant did not face the public vote
–	Contestant was in the bottom two and had to sing again in the sing-off
–	Contestant was in the bottom three but received the fewest votes and was immediately eliminated (no sing-off)
–	Contestant received the fewest public votes and was immediately eliminated
–	Contestant received the most public votes

Weekly results per contestant
Contestant	Week 1	Week 2		Week 3		Week 4 ^{1}		Week 5	Week 6		
Contestant	Week 1	Live 2	Live 3	Live 4	Live 5	Week 4 ^{1}		Week 5	Round 1	Round 2	Round 3
Amel Ćurić	Safe	—N/a	Safe	—N/a	Safe	Safe^{1}		Safe	Safe	Safe	Winner (week 6)
Boban Mojsovski	—N/a	—N/a	Safe	Safe	—N/a	Safe^{2}		Safe	Safe	Safe	Runner-up (week 6)
Iva Ćurić	Safe	—N/a	Safe	Safe	—N/a	Safe^{2}		Safe	Safe	3rd	Eliminated (week 6)
Highway	—N/a	—N/a	Safe	Safe	—N/a	Bottom six^{1}		Safe	Safe	4th	Eliminated (week 6)
Magdalena Bogić	Safe	—N/a	Safe	—N/a	Safe	Safe^{2}		Bottom three	5th	Eliminated (week 6)	
9 Control	Safe	Safe	—N/a	—N/a	Safe	Safe^{1}		Safe	6th	Eliminated (week 6)	
Adnan & Tarik	—N/a	Safe	—N/a	Safe	—N/a	Safe^{2}		Bottom three	Eliminated (week 5)		
Antonio Krištofić	Safe	Safe	—N/a	—N/a	Safe	Bottom six^{1}		8th	Eliminated (week 5)		
David Temelkov	Safe	Safe	—N/a	—N/a	Safe	Bottom six^{1}		Eliminated (week 4)			
Ilija Mihailović	Safe	—N/a	6th	Safe	—N/a	Bottom six^{1}		Eliminated (week 4)			
Milan Bukilić	—N/a	Bottom two	—N/a	—N/a	6th	Bottom two^{2}		Eliminated (week 4)			
Katarina Simić	Safe	Safe	—N/a	6th	—N/a	Bottom two^{1}		Eliminated (week 4)			
Danijela Večerinović	—N/a	—N/a	—N/a	—N/a	7th	Eliminated (week 3)					
Jelena Đurić	Safe	Safe	—N/a	7th	Eliminated (week 3)						
AnđeliNE	Bottom two	—N/a	7th	Eliminated (week 2)							
Nikola Marjanović	Safe	Bottom two	Eliminated (week 2)								
Infinitas	Bottom two	Eliminated (week 1)									
Sing-off	AnđeliNE, Infinitas	Milan Bukilić, Nikola Marjanović	AnđeliNE, Ilija Mihailović	Jelena Đurić, Katarina Simić	Milan Bukilić, Danijela Večerinović	Antonio Krištofić, Ilija Mihailović	Highway, David Temelkov	Adnan & Tarik, Magdalena Bogić	No sing-off or judges' votes; results were based on public votes alone		
Huljić's vote to eliminate	—N/a	Nikola Marjanović	Ilija Mihailović	Jelena Đurić	Milan Bukilić	Ilija Mihailović	David Temelkov	Magdalena Bogić	No sing-off or judges' votes; results were based on public votes alone		
Joksimović's vote to eliminate	Infinitas	Nikola Marjanović	AnđeliNE	Jelena Đurić	Danijela Večerinović	Antonio Krištofić	David Temelkov	Adnan & Tarik	No sing-off or judges' votes; results were based on public votes alone		
Kovač's vote to eliminate	AnđeliNE	Nikola Marjanović	AnđeliNE	Katarina Simić	Danijela Večerinović	Antonio Krištofić	Highway	Adnan & Tarik	No sing-off or judges' votes; results were based on public votes alone		
Savić's vote to eliminate	Infinitas	Milan Bukilić	Ilija Mihailović	Katarina Simić	Milan Bukilić	Ilija Mihailović	David Temelkov	Adnan & Tarik	No sing-off or judges' votes; results were based on public votes alone		
Eliminated	Infinitas; 2 of 3 votes Majority	Nikola Marjanović; 3 of 4 votes Majority	AnđeliNE; 2 of 4 votes Deadlock	Jelena Đurić; 2 of 4 votes Deadlock	Danijela Večerinović; 2 of 4 votes Deadlock	Ilija Mihailović; 2 of 4 votes Deadlock	David Temelkov; 3 of 4 votes Majority	Adnan & Tarik; 3 of 4 votes Majority	9 Control; Public vote to win	Highway; Public vote to win	Boban Mojsovski; Public vote to win
Eliminated	Infinitas; 2 of 3 votes Majority	Nikola Marjanović; 3 of 4 votes Majority	AnđeliNE; 2 of 4 votes Deadlock	Jelena Đurić; 2 of 4 votes Deadlock	Danijela Večerinović; 2 of 4 votes Deadlock	Ilija Mihailović; 2 of 4 votes Deadlock	David Temelkov; 3 of 4 votes Majority	Adnan & Tarik; 3 of 4 votes Majority	Magdalena Bogić; Public vote to win	Iva Ćurić; Public vote to win	Boban Mojsovski; Public vote to win

- ^1 In the fourth week the contestants were divided into two groups, but unlike in previous weeks, the results were gathered, and the two contestants with the lowest number of votes left competition, while the contestants ranked from seventh to tenth place were in the sing-off. Production has not announced that duels were joined. Competitors are marked with ^{1} are performed on June 7, and the competitors marked with ^{2} on June 8.

=== Live show details ===
==== Week 1 (17 May) ====
- Theme: Judges' choice
- Group performance: "Let Me Entertain You"
- Musical guest: Måns Zelmerlöw ("Heroes")

Contestants' performances on the first live show
Act	Order	Song	Result
Amel Ćurić	1	"Lud i ponosan"	Safe
AnđeliNE	2	"Lights"	Bottom two
Ilija Mihailović	3	"Ljuljaj me nežno"	Safe
David Temelkov	4	"Who Wants to Live Forever"	Safe
Nikola Marjanović	5	"Zašto praviš slona od mene?"	Safe
Magdalena Bogić	6	"Addicted to You"	Safe
Antonio Krištofić	7	"Stotinama godina"	Safe
Jelena Đurić	8	"I Put a Spell on You"	Safe
Infinitas	9	"Oprosti"	Bottom two
Katarina Simić	10	"Ne tiče me se"	Safe
Iva Ćurić	11	"Diamonds"	Safe
9 Control	12	"Hipnotiziran"	Safe
Sing-off details
Infinitas	1	"Srce predajem ti"	Eliminated
AnđeliNE	2	"Smejem se, a plakao bih"	Safe

Judges' votes to eliminate

- Huljić: Couldn't make a decision, as two of his groups were in the bottom two.
- Joksimović: Infinitas
- Kovač: AnđeliNE
- Savić: Infinitas

==== Week 2 (24–25 May) ====
- Theme: Eurovision hits

(Live 2)

- Group performance: "Lane moje"
- Musical guest: Roma Sijam ("Nasti adjikare")

(Live 3)

- Group performance: "Hajde da ludujemo"
- Musical guest: Knez ("Adio"), Lana Jurčević ("Ludo ljeto")

Contestants' performances on the second live show
Live 2 (24 May)
Act	Order	Song	Result
Adnan & Tarik	1	"For Real"	Safe
Antonio Krištofić	2	"Gori vatra"	Safe
Nikola Marjanović	3	"Pokušaj"	Bottom two
Jelena Đurić	4	"Nebo"	Safe
Milan Bukilić	5	"Džuli"	Bottom two
Katarina Simić	6	"Euphoria"	Safe
9 Control	7	"Hold Me Now"	Safe
David Temelkov	8	"Crno i belo"	Safe
Sing-off details
Nikola Marjanović	1	"Stay"	Eliminated
Milan Bukilić	2	"Žute dunje"	Safe
Live 3 (25 May)
Act	Order	Song	Result
Boban Mojskovski	1	"Kad zaspu anđeli"	Safe
Highway	2	"Zauvijek moja"	Safe
Iva Ćurić	3	"Satellite"	Safe
Ilija Mihailović	4	"Fairytale"	Bottom two
Magdalena Bogić	5	"Oro"	Safe
AnđeliNE	6	"Waterloo"	Bottom two
Amel Curić	7	"Lejla"	Safe
Sing-off details
Ilija Mihailović	1	"Idemo dalje"	Safe
AnđeliNE	2	"Valerie"	Eliminated

Judges' votes to eliminate (Live 2)

- Joksimović: Nikola Marjanović
- Kovač: Nikola Marjanović
- Savić: Milan Bukilić
- Huljić: Nikola Marjanović

Judges' votes to eliminate (Live 3)

- Kovač: AnđeliNE
- Joksimović: AnđeliNE
- Savić: Ilija Mihailović
- Huljić: Ilija Mihailović

==== Week 3 (31 May-1 June) ====
- Theme: Love songs

(Live 4)

- Group performance:
- Musical guest: Magazin ("Doktore"), Massimo Savić ("Kladim se na nas")

(Live 5)

- Group performance:
- Musical guest: Sars ("Lutka"), Elena Risteska ("Doživotno")

Contestants' performances on the third live show
Live 4 (31 May)
Act	Order	Song	Result
Iva Ćurić	1	"Video Games"	Safe
Boban Mojskovski	2	"Opet si pobijedila"	Safe
Jelena Đurić	3	"Take Me to Church"	Bottom two
Ilija Mihailović	4	"Impossible"	Safe
Highway	5	"Neko te ima"	Safe
Katarina Simić	6	"More pelina"	Bottom two
Adnan & Tarik	7	"Ludak kao ja"	Safe
Sing-off details
Katarina Simić	1	"Zajdi, zajdi, jasno sonce"	Safe
Jelena Đurić	2	"Imagine"	Eliminated
Live 5 (1 June)
Act	Order	Song	Result
Antonio Krištofić	1	"Umirem 100 puta dnevno"	Safe
Amel Ćurić	2	"Love Me Again"	Safe
Danijela Večerinović	3	"Rijeka bez imena"	Bottom two
9 Control	4	"Mirrors"	Safe
Milan Bukilić	5	"Story of My Life"	Bottom two
Magdalena Bogić	6	"Kao da me nema tu"	Safe
David Temelkov	7	"Jedina"	Safe
Sing-off details
Milan Bukilić	1	"Ko lijana"	Safe
Danijela Večerinović	2	"Give Me One Reason"	Eliminated

Judges' votes to eliminate (Live 4)

- Joksimović: Jelena Đurić
- Huljić: Jelena Đurić
- Kovač: Katarina Simić
- Savić: Katarina Simić

Judges' votes to eliminate (Live 5)

- Kovač: Danijela Večerinović
- Joksimović: Danijela Večerinović
- Savić: Milan Bukilić
- Huljić: Milan Bukilić

==== Week 4 (7-8 June) ====
- Theme: Contestants' choice

(Live 6)

- Group performance:
- Musical guest: Vanna ("Tek je 12 sati") / ("Lopov"), Petar Grašo ("Moje zlato")

(Live 7)

- Group performance:
- Musical guest: Saša Kovačević ("Gde smo moja ljubavi"), Karolina Gočeva ("Koj da mi zapee")

Contestants' performances on the fourth live show
Live 6 (7 June)
Act	Order	Song	Result
David Temelkov	1	"Feel"	Bottom four
9 Control	2	"Uptown Funk" / "Kiss"	Safe
Antonio Krištofić	3	"Utorak"	Bottom four
Ilija Mihailović	4	"Magdalena"	Bottom four
Katarina Simić	5	"Crazy in Love" / "Crazy"	Eliminated
Highway	6	"Lud"	Bottom four
Amel Ćurić	7	"Pjesmo moja"	Safe
Duel 1
Antonio Krištofić	1	"Kanet na vetru"	Safe
Ilija Mihailović	2	"All of Me"	Eliminated
Duel 2
David Temelkov	1	"Igra bez granica"	Eliminated
Highway	2	"I Need a Dollar"	Safe
Live 7 (8 June)
Act	Order	Song	Result
Magdalena Bogić	1	"Više se ne vraćaš"	Safe
Adnan & Tarik	2	"Mirrors"	Safe
Boban Mojsovski	3	"Po tebe"	Safe
Iva Ćurić	4	"Give It to Me Right"	Safe
Milan Bukilić	5	"Ne kuni me, ne ruži me majko"	Eliminated

Judges' votes to eliminate (Duel 1)

- Joksimović: Ilija Mihailović
- Huljić: Ilija Mihailović
- Kovač: Antonio Krištofić
- Savić: Antonio Krištofić

Judges' votes to eliminate (Duel 2)

- Kovač: Highway
- Joksimović: David Temelkov
- Savić: David Temelkov
- Huljić: David Temelkov

==== Week 5 (14 June) ====
(Live 8)

- Theme: Songs with dedication
- Group performance:
- Musical guest: Lukijan Ivanović ("Hajde voli me.."), Jacques Houdek ("Nov čovjek"), Slavko Kalezić ("Feel the love"), Vlaho Arbulić ("Bla Bla ")

Contestants' performances on the fifth live show
Live 8 (14 June)
Act	Order	Song	Result
Antonio Krištofić	1	"Iz jednog pogleda"	Eliminated
Magdalena Bogić	2	"Ginem"	Bottom two
9 Control	3	"Rule the World"	Safe
Amel Ćurić	4	"Teške boje" / "Are You Gonna Go My Way"	Safe
Iva Ćurić	5	"Klinika"	Safe
Highway	6	"Par godina za nas" / "Ti si sav moj bol"	Safe
Boban Mojsovski	7	"Counting Stars"	Safe
Adnan & Tarik	8	"Kako sam te voljela" / "Sve je laž" / "Smoke on the Water"	Bottom two
Sing-off details
Magdalena Bogić	1	"Ima jedan svijet"	Safe
Adnan & Tarik	2	"Ti si mi u krvi"	Eliminated

Judges' votes to eliminate (Live 8)

- Huljić: Magdalena Bogić
- Kovač: Adnan & Tarik
- Joksimović: Adnan & Tarik
- Savić: Adnan & Tarik

==== Week 6 (21 June) ====
(Live 9)

- Theme:
- Group performance:
- Musical guest: James Arthur ("Recovery", "Impossible"), Jelena Rozga ("Kraljica"), Željko Joksimović ("Ranjena zver"), Aleksandra Kovač ("Da li nekada sanjaš san"), Tonči Huljić & Madre Badessa feat. Massimo ("Fuman")

Contestants' performances on the final live show
Act	Order	First song	Order	Second song	Order	Third song	Result
Boban Mojsovski	1	"Polsko cveke"	3	"The Show Must Go On"	2	"Bed of Roses"	Runner-up
Magdalena Bogić	2	"Read All About It" / "We Found Love"	N/A - already eliminated				Fifth place
9 Control	3	"Devojko mala"	N/A - already eliminated				Sixth place
Highway	4	"Do I Wanna Know?"	2	"Sve je lako kad si mlad" / "Šta sad ljubav ima s tim"	N/A - already eliminated		Fourth place
Iva Ćurić	5	"Ima nešto u tome što me nećeš"	1	"Rather Be"	N/A - already eliminated		Third place
Amel Ćurić	6	"It's My Life"	4	"Sve je to od lošeg vina"	1	"Da te bogdo ne volim"	Winner

== Episodes ==
#	Stage of competition	Original air date
1	Auditions 1	March 22, 2015
2	Auditions 2	March 29, 2015
3	Auditions 3	April 6, 2015
4	Auditions 4	April 13, 2015
5	Auditions 5	April 19, 2015
6	Bootcamp (Boys & Over 27s)	April 26, 2015
7	Bootcamp (Girls & Groups)	April 27, 2015
8	Judges' Houses (Over 27s & Girls)	May 3, 2015
9	Judges' Houses (Boys & Groups)	May 10, 2015
10	Live show 1	May 17, 2015
11	Live show 2	May 24, 2015
12	Live show 3	May 25, 2015
13	Live show 4	May 31, 2015
14	Live show 5	June 1, 2015
15	Live show 6	June 7, 2015
16	Live show 7	June 8, 2015
17	Live show 8	June 14, 2015
18	Final	June 21, 2015
