= X Factor Adria series 1 =

X Factor Adria
- Series 1
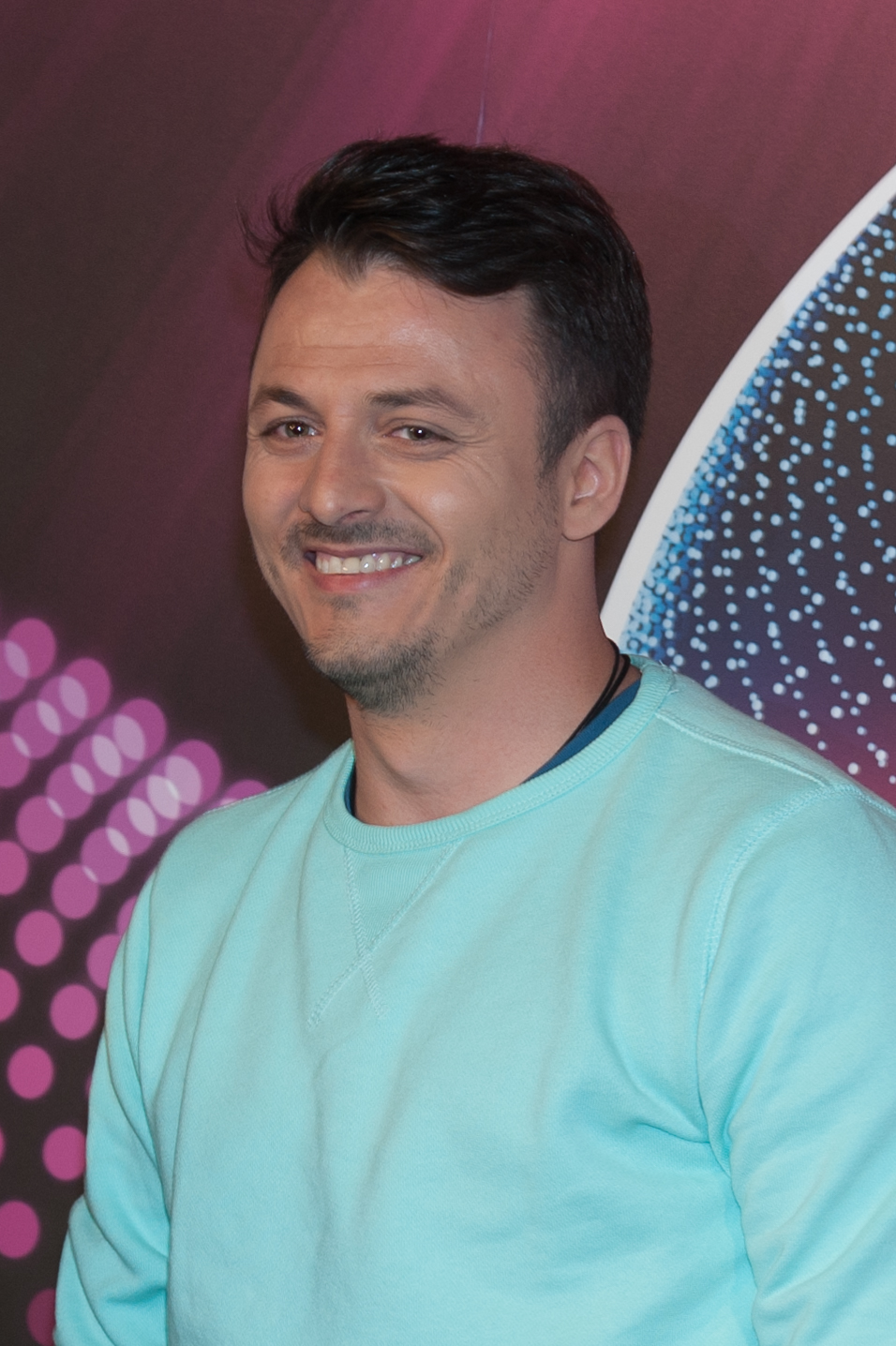
- Daniel Kajmakoski in 2015.
- Hosted by: Ana Grubin
- Judges: Emina Jahović; Kristina Kovač; Kiki Lesendrić; Željko Joksimović
- Winner: Daniel Kajmakoski
- Runner-up: Tamara Milanović
- Finals venue: Kombank Arena

Release
- Original network: RTV Pink; Sitel
- Original release: 29 October 2013 – 23 March 2014

Series chronology
- Next → Series 2

X Factor Adria is a Serbian version of The X Factor franchise. The first series started broadcasting in late October 2013. Even though the production is Serbian, auditions were held in Montenegro, Bosnia and Herzegovina and North Macedonia - making the series pan regional.
The series judging panel features Emina Jahović, Kristina Kovač, Kiki Lesendrić and Željko Joksimović. The auditions were hosted by Bane Jevtić with Sneže Velkov as a co-host. Una Senić hosted the spin-off series and co-hosted during the judges houses. After the first two episodes were aired it was rumored that Bane would be replaced by another host, but the producers denied it. On the night of the first live show it was announced that Bane would be replaced by Slavko Kalezić - actor and a contestant that was eliminated in the Judges Houses phase of the competition. Day after the first live show aired it was announced that Slavko would be replaced as well. On January 14, 2014, Ana Grubin revealed she will be new host, while Una Senić and Sneže Velkov report from the backstage.

== Selection process ==
=== Auditions ===
Contestants were able to apply via text messages and an online form on the shows Facebook page. During the Exit Festival a mobile audition booth was set up and people could audition before previously applying. All of the applicants needed to preaudition for the producers before actually auditioning in front of the judges. The pre-auditions were held from August 20 to September 2 in Budva, Skopje, Banja Luka, Sarajevo, Niš, Novi Sad and Belgrade. After seeing all the acts, producers select a number of contestants that will audition in front of the judges.

From over 8000 acts that came to pre-auditions, producers selected 300 that were put through to judges auditions. The judges auditions are held solely in Šimanovci where the producers, RTV Pink, have their biggest studios. These auditions are the first part of the auditioning process that is broadcast to the public. The auditions were filmed in front of a live audience.

These are all of the contestants shown during the auditions episodes:

Key:

– Contestant was eliminated

#	Name	From	Category	Song	Eliminated
1	Ilma Karahmet	Kiseljak, Bosnia and Herzegovina	Girls	Zorica Kondža, Stijene - Ima jedan svijet	No
2	Slavko Kalezić	Podgorica, Montenegro	Over 27s	Beyoncé - End of Time	No
3	Aleksa Perović	Kraljevo, Serbia	Boys	Sergej Ćetković - Kad bi htjela ti	No
4	Hristina Vuković	Belgrade, Serbia	Girls	David Guetta ft. Sia - Titanium	No
5	Milana Drljača	Banja Luka, Bosnia and Herzegovina	Girls	Alicia Keys - Fallin'	Yes
6	Petar Jojić	Belgrade, Serbia	Boys	Zdravko Čolić - Živiš u oblacima mala	No
7	Martinijan Kirilovski	Kumanovo, Macedonia	Boys	Goran Karan - Ostani	No
8	Angela Miteva	Skopje, Macedonia	Girls	Maroon 5 - Sunday Morning	No
9	Manja Sofronievska	Skopje, Macedonia	Girls	Etta James - At Last, Jovano Jovanke	No
10	Irma Dragičević	Varaždin, Croatia	Girls	Beyoncé - Resentment, Michael Jackson - Who's Loving You^{1}	No
11	Jana and Luka	Belgrade, Serbia	Groups	Madcon - Beggin	No
12	Tamara Milanović	Belgrade, Serbia	Girls	Adele - Don't You Remember	No
13	Katarina Manojlović	Belgrade, Serbia	Girls	Adele - Turning Tables, Jennifer Hudson - One Night Only	No
14	Vanja Prokopijević	Belgrade, Serbia	Over 27s	Pink - Try	No
15	Jelena Milovanović	Kovin, Serbia	Girls	Beyoncé - Best Thing I Never Had, Justin Bieber - As Long As You Love Me	No
16	Aleksandra Sekulić	Belgrade, Serbia	Girls	Adele - Skyfall	No
17	Roma Sijam	Belgrade, Serbia	Groups	Travie McCoy - Billionaire	No
18	Fifi Janevska	Skopje, Macedonia	Girls	Cher - Dov'è l'amore, Christina Aguilera - Beautiful	No
19	Marko Balabanović	Majdanpek, Serbia	Boys	EKV - Ti si sav moj bol	No
20	Ninoslav Todorović	Belgrade, Serbia	Over 27s	Bijelo Dugme - A i ti me iznevjeri	Yes
21	Nikola Paunović	Kragujevac, Serbia	Over 27s	Beyoncé - Listen	No
22	Efimija Jovanova	—N/a	Girls	Bruno Mars - Grenade, Toše Proeski - Žao mi je	Yes
23	Maggie Petković	Oslo, Norway	Girls	Kings of Leon - Use Somebody	No
24	Stefan Koković	Belgrade, Serbia	Boys	Zucchero - Baila morena	No
25	Katarina Jovanović	Kruševac, Serbia	Girls	Dusty Springfield - Son of a Preacher Man	No
26	Harnes Safić	Sarajevo, Bosnia and Herzegovina	Over 27s	Željko Joksimović - Lane moje	Yes
27	Marija Milić	Belgrade, Serbia	Over 27s	Beyoncé - Halo	Yes
28	Marija Ičkova	Bogdanci, Macedonia	Girls	Led Zeppelin - Whole Lotta Love	No
29	Haris Ćato	Sarajevo, Bosnia and Herzegovina	Boys	Jessie J - Who You Are	No
30	Armin Malikić	Banovići, Bosnia and Herzegovina	Boys	James Morrison - Wonderful	No
31	Lana Šojić	Belgrade, Serbia	Girls	Alicia Keys - If I Ain't Got You	No
32	Marinela Đogani	Belgrade, Serbia	Girls	Selah Sue - This World	No
33	Maja Novaković	Belgrade, Serbia	Over 27s	Neverne Bebe - Tužna pesma	No
34	Dragana Rakčević	Podgorica, Montenegro	Girls	Her own song	No
35	Predrag Antić	Belgrade, Serbia	Boys	His own song	No
36	Monika Knezović	Podgorica, Montenegro	Girls	George Gershwin - Summertime	No
37	Pavle Dejanić	Uzveće, Serbia	Boys	Divlje jagode - Kap po kap	No
38	Saša Ćirić	Pale, Bosnia and Herzegovina	Over 27s	The Police - Message in a Bottle	No
39	Mladen Miljković	Košiljevo, Serbia	Boys	Bisera Veletanlić - Milo moje	Yes
40	Stefan Stanojević	Novi Sad, Serbia	Boys	Kerber - Ratne igre	Yes
41	Jelena Vukojević	Belgrade, Serbia	Girls	Jessie J - Mamma Knows Best	No
42	Kristijan Đorđević	Vranje, Serbia	Boys	Bon Jovi - Bed Of Roses	Yes
43	Sonja Bakić	Belgrade, Serbia	Over 27s	Florence and the Machine - Dog Days Are Over	No
44	Lukijan Ivanović	Banja Luka, Bosnia and Herzegovina	Boys	Loreen - My Heart is Refusing Me	No
45	Frenzy Ness	Belgrade, Serbia	Over 27s	Vatreni Poljubac - Vrati mi	Yes
46	Anđela Tasić	Belgrade, Serbia	Girls	Marija Šerifović - Bol do ludila	Yes
47	Indira Beriša	Belgrade, Serbia	Girls	Rihanna - Unfaithful	No
48	Maša Vujadinović	Podgorica, Montenegro	Girls	Dreamgirls - And I Am Telling You I'm Not Going	No
49	Mladen Lukić	Belgrade, Serbia	Over 27s	India Arie - Ready For Love	No
50	Damjan Ðurović	Rudo, Bosnia and Herzegovina	Boys	Bon Jovi - It's My Life	No
51	Teodora Sparavalo	Belgrade, Serbia	Girls	Amy Winehouse - Me And Mr. Jones	No
52	Mihajlo Milić	Sombor, Serbia	Boys	Nina Simone - Feeling Good	Yes
53	Maid Hećimović	Orašje, Bosnia and Herzegovina	Over 27s	Zdravko Čolić - Noć mi te duguje	No
54	Vanja Mišić	Banja Luka, Bosnia and Herzegovina	Girls	Natali Dizdar - Neki drugi dan	No
55	Davor Knežević	Subotica, Serbia	Boys	Kings of Leon - Use Somebody	Yes
56	Aleksandar Drekalović	Podgorica, Montenegro	Boys	Red Hot Chili Peppers - Otherside	Yes
57	Marko Drežnjak	Novi Sad, Serbia	Boys	Amy Winehouse - Back to Black	No
58	Aleksandra Brković	Čačak, Serbia	Girls	Beyoncé - Listen	No
59	Vladimir Paunović	Čačak, Serbia	Boys	Joe Cocker - Unchain My Heart	No
60	Uroš Turkulov	Novi Sad, Serbia	Boys	Joe Cocker - Unchain My Heart	No
61	Ana Maglica	Zemun, Serbia	Girls	Michael Jackson - Give In To Me	No
62	Željko Sarić	Belgrade, Serbia	Over 27s	Parni Valjak - Dođi	No
63	Bojana Račić	Pančevo, Serbia	Girls	Sade – Jezebel; Pixie Lott - Mama Do	No
64	Aleksandar Suljić	Šabac, Serbia	Over 27s	Barbra Streisand - Memory	Yes
65	Milena Tamburić	Belgrade, Serbia	Girls	Dusty Springfield - Son Of a Preacher Man	No
66	Boban Radivojević	Belgrade, Serbia	Over 27s	Elvis Presley - Hound Dog	Yes
67	Daniel Kajmakoski	Struga, Macedonia	Over 27s	Daniel Merriweather - Red	No
68	Milica Petrović	Belgrade, Serbia	Girls	Ed Sheeran - The A Team	No
69	Ivan and Kiko Radenov	Gevgelija, Macedonia	Groups	Ace Of Base - All That She Wants	No
70	Mouse Miles, Jasmin and Vedad	Sarajevo and Zenica, Bosnia and Herzegovina	Groups	Snoop Dogg feat. Pharrell Williams - Drop It Like It's Hot	No
71	Neli Al Mahmud	Podgorica, Montenegro	Girls	Toni Braxton - Un-Break My Heart	No
72	Nada Al Mahmud	Podgorica, Montenegro	Girls	Mariah Carey & Whitney Houston - When You Believe	No
73	Stefan Ajdarević	Belgrade, Serbia	Boys	Mišo Kovač - Ostala si uvijek ista	No
74	Miloš Bajat	Novi Sad, Serbia	Boys	Billy Idol - Rebel Yell	No
75	Mladen Nicić	Kavadarci, Macedonia	Boys	Tarkan - Kiss Kiss	No
76	Lena Zatkoska	Skopje, Macedonia	Girls	Whitney Houston - I Will Always Love You	No

^1Judges weren't satisfied with Irma's first song leading to her getting only one "yes" (from Željko). She went backstage and thanks to Željko (and audience) she was called back to the stage when she received four "yes-es".

=== Bootcamp ===
Bootcamp is the second phase of the competition. There was only one 90 minute episode of bootcamp which was broadcast on December 10, 2013.
All the acts that got a yes during the auditions came back and judges chose 80 of them to perform again and sent all of the other acts back home without them singing again. The 80 acts performed in ten groups of eight, each group performing a medley or a mash-up selected by the producers. Judges originally decided on the 25 acts to progress to judges houses, six from each category, except for the groups, where seven acts progressed - three of the groups consist of the acts that had previously audition as soloists. Even though it was announced that Kristina would have seven acts at her house, Mouse Miles signed a contract with a recording company and had to leave the competition, therefore the groups category had six acts, like all of the other categories, making the total number of 24 contestants that advanced through to judges houses.

Key:

– Contestant was eliminated
– Contestant progressed to the Judges' houses
– Contestant auditioned as a solo artist, but progressed to the Judges' houses in a group

Bootcamp group performances
Group	Act	Category	Songs
Group 1	Andrej Ademi	—N/a	The Police - "Message in a Bottle" Bruno Mars - "Locked Out of Heaven"
Group 1	Goran Božović	—N/a	The Police - "Message in a Bottle" Bruno Mars - "Locked Out of Heaven"
Group 1	Armin Malikić	Groups	The Police - "Message in a Bottle" Bruno Mars - "Locked Out of Heaven"
Group 1	Predrag Antić	Groups	The Police - "Message in a Bottle" Bruno Mars - "Locked Out of Heaven"
Group 1	Angela Miteva	Girls	The Police - "Message in a Bottle" Bruno Mars - "Locked Out of Heaven"
Group 1	Ivan and Kiko Radenov	Groups	The Police - "Message in a Bottle" Bruno Mars - "Locked Out of Heaven"
Group 1	Nikola Vuković	Boys	The Police - "Message in a Bottle" Bruno Mars - "Locked Out of Heaven"
Group 2	Milorad Rajković	Boys	Bonnie Tyler - "Total Eclipse of the Heart"
Group 2	Irma Dragičević	Girls	Bonnie Tyler - "Total Eclipse of the Heart"
Group 2	Tea Marić	Girls	Bonnie Tyler - "Total Eclipse of the Heart"
Group 2	Jelena Vukojević	Girls	Bonnie Tyler - "Total Eclipse of the Heart"
Group 2	Maja Novaković	Over 27s	Bonnie Tyler - "Total Eclipse of the Heart"
Group 2	Aleksandra Brković	Girls	Bonnie Tyler - "Total Eclipse of the Heart"
Group 2	Ilma Karahmet	Girls	Bonnie Tyler - "Total Eclipse of the Heart"
Group 2	Lejla Babić	Girls	Bonnie Tyler - "Total Eclipse of the Heart"
Group 2	Jana and Luka	Groups	Bonnie Tyler - "Total Eclipse of the Heart"
Group 3	Aleksa Perović	Boys	Toše Proeski - "Pratim te"/"Po Tebe" Sergej Ćetković - "Dva minuta"
Group 3	Maid Hećimović	Over 27s	Toše Proeski - "Pratim te"/"Po Tebe" Sergej Ćetković - "Dva minuta"
Group 3	Milan Bukilić	Boys	Toše Proeski - "Pratim te"/"Po Tebe" Sergej Ćetković - "Dva minuta"
Group 3	Petar Vasić	Boys	Toše Proeski - "Pratim te"/"Po Tebe" Sergej Ćetković - "Dva minuta"
Group 3	Dušan Mandić	Over 27s	Toše Proeski - "Pratim te"/"Po Tebe" Sergej Ćetković - "Dva minuta"
Group 3	Daniel Kajmakoski	Over 27s	Toše Proeski - "Pratim te"/"Po Tebe" Sergej Ćetković - "Dva minuta"
Group 3	Petar Jojić	Boys	Toše Proeski - "Pratim te"/"Po Tebe" Sergej Ćetković - "Dva minuta"
Group 4	Tamara Milanović	Girls	David Guetta featuring Sia - "Titanium" Rihanna featuring Calvin Harris - "We Found Love"
Group 4	Nina Šupica	Girls	David Guetta featuring Sia - "Titanium" Rihanna featuring Calvin Harris - "We Found Love"
Group 4	Sonja Čoko	Girls	David Guetta featuring Sia - "Titanium" Rihanna featuring Calvin Harris - "We Found Love"
Group 4	Sonja Bakić	Over 27s	David Guetta featuring Sia - "Titanium" Rihanna featuring Calvin Harris - "We Found Love"
Group 4	Lena Zatkoska	Girls	David Guetta featuring Sia - "Titanium" Rihanna featuring Calvin Harris - "We Found Love"
Group 4	Manja Sofronievska	Girls	David Guetta featuring Sia - "Titanium" Rihanna featuring Calvin Harris - "We Found Love"
Group 4	Dragana Rakčević	Girls	David Guetta featuring Sia - "Titanium" Rihanna featuring Calvin Harris - "We Found Love"
Group 5	Milica Petrović	Girls	Louis Armstrong - "Dream a Little Dream of Me" Eurythmics - "Sweet Dreams (Are Made of This)" Frankie Valli - "Can't Take My Eyes Off You"
Group 5	Teodora Sparavalo	Groups	Louis Armstrong - "Dream a Little Dream of Me" Eurythmics - "Sweet Dreams (Are Made of This)" Frankie Valli - "Can't Take My Eyes Off You"
Group 5	Marko Drežnjak	Boys	Louis Armstrong - "Dream a Little Dream of Me" Eurythmics - "Sweet Dreams (Are Made of This)" Frankie Valli - "Can't Take My Eyes Off You"
Group 5	Uroš Turkulov	Groups	Louis Armstrong - "Dream a Little Dream of Me" Eurythmics - "Sweet Dreams (Are Made of This)" Frankie Valli - "Can't Take My Eyes Off You"
Group 5	Marko Janković	Over 27s	Louis Armstrong - "Dream a Little Dream of Me" Eurythmics - "Sweet Dreams (Are Made of This)" Frankie Valli - "Can't Take My Eyes Off You"
Group 5	Stefan Koković	Boys	Louis Armstrong - "Dream a Little Dream of Me" Eurythmics - "Sweet Dreams (Are Made of This)" Frankie Valli - "Can't Take My Eyes Off You"
Group 5	Azra Kelecija	Girls	Louis Armstrong - "Dream a Little Dream of Me" Eurythmics - "Sweet Dreams (Are Made of This)" Frankie Valli - "Can't Take My Eyes Off You"
Group 5	Lana Šojić	Groups	Louis Armstrong - "Dream a Little Dream of Me" Eurythmics - "Sweet Dreams (Are Made of This)" Frankie Valli - "Can't Take My Eyes Off You"
Group 6	Jelena Milovanović	Girls	Zemlja gruva - "Najlepše želje" Oktobar 1864 - "Nađi me"
Group 6	Katarina Manojlović	Groups	Zemlja gruva - "Najlepše želje" Oktobar 1864 - "Nađi me"
Group 6	Aleksandra Sekulić	Girls	Zemlja gruva - "Najlepše želje" Oktobar 1864 - "Nađi me"
Group 6	Monika Knezović	Girls	Zemlja gruva - "Najlepše želje" Oktobar 1864 - "Nađi me"
Group 6	Milena Tamburić	Girls	Zemlja gruva - "Najlepše želje" Oktobar 1864 - "Nađi me"
Group 6	Natalija Stokić	Girls	Zemlja gruva - "Najlepše želje" Oktobar 1864 - "Nađi me"
Group 6	Hristina Vuković	Girls	Zemlja gruva - "Najlepše želje" Oktobar 1864 - "Nađi me"
Group 7	Miloš Bajat	Boys	Van Gog - "Neko te ima noćas" EKV - "Ti si sav moj bol"
Group 7	Ivan Stanojević	Boys	Van Gog - "Neko te ima noćas" EKV - "Ti si sav moj bol"
Group 7	Damjan Đurović	Boys	Van Gog - "Neko te ima noćas" EKV - "Ti si sav moj bol"
Group 7	Marko Balabanović	Groups	Van Gog - "Neko te ima noćas" EKV - "Ti si sav moj bol"
Group 7	Vanja Prokopijević	Over 27s	Van Gog - "Neko te ima noćas" EKV - "Ti si sav moj bol"
Group 7	Ana Maglica	Girls	Van Gog - "Neko te ima noćas" EKV - "Ti si sav moj bol"
Group 7	Mladen Lukić	Over 27s	Van Gog - "Neko te ima noćas" EKV - "Ti si sav moj bol"
Group 7	Nikola Paunović	Over 27s	Van Gog - "Neko te ima noćas" EKV - "Ti si sav moj bol"
Group 8	Vladimir Paunović	Boys	Daft Punk featuring Pharrell - "Get Lucky" Jamiroquai - "Cosmic Girl"
Group 8	Slavko Kalezić	Over 27s	Daft Punk featuring Pharrell - "Get Lucky" Jamiroquai - "Cosmic Girl"
Group 8	Mouse Miles	Groups	Daft Punk featuring Pharrell - "Get Lucky" Jamiroquai - "Cosmic Girl"
Group 8	Ana Denić	Girls	Daft Punk featuring Pharrell - "Get Lucky" Jamiroquai - "Cosmic Girl"
Group 8	Tijana Vučković	Girls	Daft Punk featuring Pharrell - "Get Lucky" Jamiroquai - "Cosmic Girl"
Group 8	Saša Čečavac	Boys	Daft Punk featuring Pharrell - "Get Lucky" Jamiroquai - "Cosmic Girl"
Group 8	Marinela Đogani	Groups	Daft Punk featuring Pharrell - "Get Lucky" Jamiroquai - "Cosmic Girl"
Group 8	Katarina Jovanović	Girls	Daft Punk featuring Pharrell - "Get Lucky" Jamiroquai - "Cosmic Girl"
Group 9	Nikola Stanojević	Groups	Đavoli - "Pričaj mi o ljubavi" Plavi Orkestar - "Good Bye Teens"
Group 9	Pavle Dejanić	Boys	Đavoli - "Pričaj mi o ljubavi" Plavi Orkestar - "Good Bye Teens"
Group 9	Marko Jović	Boys	Đavoli - "Pričaj mi o ljubavi" Plavi Orkestar - "Good Bye Teens"
Group 9	Vanja Mišić	Groups	Đavoli - "Pričaj mi o ljubavi" Plavi Orkestar - "Good Bye Teens"
Group 9	Haris Ćato	Boys	Đavoli - "Pričaj mi o ljubavi" Plavi Orkestar - "Good Bye Teens"
Group 9	Lukijan Ivanović	Boys	Đavoli - "Pričaj mi o ljubavi" Plavi Orkestar - "Good Bye Teens"
Group 9	Željko Sarić	Over 27s	Đavoli - "Pričaj mi o ljubavi" Plavi Orkestar - "Good Bye Teens"
Group 9	Stefan Davidovski	Boys	Đavoli - "Pričaj mi o ljubavi" Plavi Orkestar - "Good Bye Teens"
Group 10	Fifi Janevska	Groups	Bebi Dol - "Brazil" Leb i sol - "Skopje"
Group 10	Varja Topalović	Girls	Bebi Dol - "Brazil" Leb i sol - "Skopje"
Group 10	Indira Beriša	Girls	Bebi Dol - "Brazil" Leb i sol - "Skopje"
Group 10	Roma Sijam	Groups	Bebi Dol - "Brazil" Leb i sol - "Skopje"
Group 10	Natalija and Dančo	Groups	Bebi Dol - "Brazil" Leb i sol - "Skopje"
Group 10	Ivana Melinkovik	Girls	Bebi Dol - "Brazil" Leb i sol - "Skopje"
Group 10	Neli and Nada Al Mahmud	Groups	Bebi Dol - "Brazil" Leb i sol - "Skopje"
Group 10	Bojana Račić	Over 27s	Bebi Dol - "Brazil" Leb i sol - "Skopje"

The 24 acts that progressed to the judges houses:

- Boys: Miloš Bajat, Haris Ćato, Lukijan Ivanović, Petar Jojić, Stefan Koković, Aleksa Perović
- Girls: Aleksandra Brković, Katarina Jovanović, Ilma Karahmet, Tamara Milanović, Aleksandra Sekulić, Hristina Vuković
- Over 27s: Maid Hećimović, Daniel Kajmakoski, Slavko Kalezić, Mladen Lukić, Maja Novaković, Bojana Račić
- Groups: Ivan & Kiko Radenov, Jana Vuković & Luka Grumić, Roma Sijam, 4U, Doktori, H2O

=== Judges' houses ===
At the end of Bootcamp, it was revealed that the boys category would be mentored by Jahović, the girls by Lesendrić, the over 27s by Joksimović and the groups would be mentored by Kovač.
Some information about the locations of the judges houses were leaked and published via various tabloids. It was revealed that Kiki was assisted by Scott Mills at his judges' houses, Emina by Mustafa Sandal and Joksimović by Tony Cetinski. Jahović took the boys to Istanbul for vocal coaching, but the performances and elimination were recorded in Belgrade.

Summary of judges' houses
Judge	Category	Location	Assistant	Contestants eliminated	Second Chance contestant
Jahović	Boys	Istanbul, Turkey/ Belgrade, Serbia	Mustafa Sandal	Miloš Bajat, Petar Jojić, Stefan Koković	Miloš Bajat
Lesendrić	Girls	Belgrade, Serbia	Scott Mills	Katarina Jovanović, Aleksandra Sekulić, Hristina Vuković	Aleksandra Sekulić
Joksimović	Over 27s	Budva, Montenegro	Tony Cetinski	Maid Hećimović, Slavko Kalezić, Bojana Račić	Maid Hećimović
Kovač	Groups	Belgrade, Serbia	Leontina Vukomanović	Ivan & Kiko Radenov, Jana Vuković & Luka Grumić, Roma Sijam	Jana Vuković & Luka Grumić

==== Second chance ====
At the end of the first Judges' houses episode it was announced that the public would be given a chance to bring back a contestant that was eliminated and therefore did not make it to their respective judges' final three. After the votes have been cast and counted, four acts with the most votes from each category will come back on the first live show, after which only one of them would stay in the competition alongside other 12 contestants.
On the second live show it was announced that it was a close call between Maid Hećimović and Aleksandra Sekulić, so the producers decided to bring them both back.

== Contestants ==
Key:

– Winner
– Runner-up
– Third place

Category (mentor)	Acts			
Boys (Jahović)	Haris Ćato	Lukijan Ivanović	Aleksa Perović	
Girls (Lesendrić)	Aleksandra Brković	Ilma Karahmet	Tamara Milanović	Aleksandra Sekulić
Over 27s (Joksimović)	Maid Hećimović	Daniel Kajmakoski	Mladen Lukić	Maja Novaković
Groups (Kovač)	4U	Doktori	H2O	

== Live shows ==
The first live show episode was broadcast on 7 January 2014.

=== The Final ===
The final took place in Kombank Arena, Belgrade.

=== Result summary ===
Colour key

–	Contestant was in the bottom two and had to sing again in the sing-off
–	Contestant was in the bottom three but received the fewest votes and was immediately eliminated (no sing-off)
–	Contestant received the fewest public votes and was immediately eliminated (no sing-off)
–	Contestant received the most public votes

Weekly results per contestant
Contestant	Week 1	Week 2	Week 3	Week 4	Week 5	Week 6	Week 7	Week 8	Week 9	
Contestant	Week 1	Week 2	Week 3	Week 4	Week 5	Week 6	Week 7	Week 8	Round 1	Round 2
Daniel Kajmakoski	Safe	Safe	Safe	Safe	Safe	Safe	Safe	Safe	Safe	Winner (week 9)
Tamara Milanović	Safe	Safe	Safe	Safe	Safe	Safe	Safe	Safe	Safe	Runner-up (week 9)
Maid Hećimović	—N/a	—N/a	Safe	Safe	Safe	Safe	6th	Bottom two	Safe	3rd (week 9)
Lukijan Ivanović	Safe	Safe	Safe	Safe	Safe	8th	Safe	Safe	4th	Eliminated (week 9)
Doktori	Safe	Safe	Safe	Safe	Safe	Safe	Safe	Safe	5th	Eliminated (week 9)
Ilma Karahmet	Safe	Safe	Safe	Safe	Safe	Safe	Safe	Bottom two	Eliminated (week 8)	
Aleksa Perović	Safe	Safe	Safe	Safe	Safe	Safe	7th	Eliminated (week 7)		
Aleksandra Brković	11th	Safe	Safe	Bottom two	Safe	Safe	8th	Eliminated (week 7)		
Haris Ćato	Safe	Safe	Safe	Safe	9th	9th	Eliminated (week 6)			
4U	Safe	Bottom two	Safe	Safe	10th	Eliminated (week 5)				
Aleksandra Sekulić	—N/a	Safe	Bottom two	Bottom two	Eliminated (week 4)					
H2O	Safe	Safe	Bottom two	Eliminated (week 3)						
Maja Novaković	Safe	Bottom two	Eliminated (week 2)							
Mladen Lukić	12th	Eliminated (week 1)								
Sing-off	Aleksandra Brković, Mladen Lukić	4U, Maja Novaković	Aleksandra Sekulić, H2O	Aleksandra Brković, Aleksandra Sekulić	4U, Haris Ćato	Haris Ćato, Lukijan Ivanović	Aleksa Perović, Maid Hećimović	Ilma Karahmet, Maid Hećimović	No sing-off or judges' votes; results were based on public votes alone	
Jahović's vote to eliminate	Aleksandra Brković	Maja Novaković	H2O	Aleksandra Sekulić	4U	Lukijan Ivanović	Maid Hećimović	Ilma Karahmet	No sing-off or judges' votes; results were based on public votes alone	
Kovač's vote to eliminate	Mladen Lukić	Maja Novaković	Aleksandra Sekulić	Aleksandra Sekulić	Haris Ćato	Lukijan Ivanović	Aleksa Perović	Ilma Karahmet	No sing-off or judges' votes; results were based on public votes alone	
Lesendrić's vote to eliminate	Mladen Lukić	Maja Novaković	H2O	Aleksandra Sekulić	Haris Ćato	Haris Ćato	Maid Hećimović	Maid Hećimović	No sing-off or judges' votes; results were based on public votes alone	
Joksimović's vote to eliminate	Aleksandra Brković	4U	H2O	—N/a^{1}	4U	Haris Ćato	Aleksa Perović	Ilma Karahmet	No sing-off or judges' votes; results were based on public votes alone	
Eliminated	Mladen Lukić; 2 of 4 votes Deadlock	Maja Novaković; 3 of 4 votes Majority	H2O; 3 of 4 votes Majority	Aleksandra Sekulić; 3 of 4 votes Majority	4U; 2 of 4 votes Deadlock	Haris Ćato; 2 of 4 votes Deadlock	Aleksa Perović; 2 of 4 votes Deadlock	Ilma Karahmet; 3 of 4 votes Majority	Doktori; Public vote to win	Maid Hećimović; Public vote to win
Eliminated	Mladen Lukić; 2 of 4 votes Deadlock	Maja Novaković; 3 of 4 votes Majority	H2O; 3 of 4 votes Majority	Aleksandra Sekulić; 3 of 4 votes Majority	4U; 2 of 4 votes Deadlock	Haris Ćato; 2 of 4 votes Deadlock	Aleksandra Brković; Public vote to save	Ilma Karahmet; 3 of 4 votes Majority	Lukijan Ivanović; Public vote to win	Tamara Milanović; Public vote to win

- ^1 Joksimović was not required to vote as there already was a majority, but said he would have voted in Sekulić's favour in support of her future endeavours

=== Live show details ===
==== Week 1 (7 January) ====
- Theme: Judges' choice
- Group performance: "Za milion godina", "We Are the World"
- Musical guest: 2Cellos ("Smooth Criminal" and "Smells Like Teen Spirit")

Contestants' performances on the first live show
Act	Order	Song	Result
Aleksandra Brković	1	"You Got the Love"	Bottom two
Mladen Lukić	2	"Bacila je sve niz rijeku"	Bottom two
4U	3	"Roar"	Safe
Haris Ćato	4	"Stay"	Safe
Ilma Karahmet	5	"Sve će to o mila moja"	Safe
Aleksa Perović	6	"Un Amor"	Safe
Maja Novaković	7	"Ako je vrijedilo išta"	Safe
H2O	8	"Beautiful"	Safe
Doktori	9	"Osloni se na mene"	Safe
Tamara Milanović	10	"Dodirni mi kolena"	Safe
Lukijan Ivanović	11	"Sorry Seems to Be the Hardest Word"	Safe
Daniel Kajmakoski	12	"One"	Safe
Sing-off details
Aleksandra Brković	1	"Nobody's Perfect"	Safe
Mladen Lukić	2	"Rijeka suza i na njoj lađa"	Eliminated

Judges' votes to eliminate

- Lesendrić: Mladen Lukić – backed his own act, Aleksandra Brković
- Joksimović: Aleksandra Brković – backed his own act, Mladen Lukić
- Kovač: Mladen Lukić – gave no reason, said it was by instinct
- Jahović: Aleksandra Brković – could not decide so chose to take it to deadlock

With the acts in the bottom two receiving two votes each, the result was deadlocked and reverted to the earlier public vote. Lukić was eliminated as the act with the fewest public votes.

==== Week 2 (14 January) ====
- Theme: Love and heartbreak
- Musical guest: Hari Varešanović ("Lejla" and "Baš ti lijepo stoje suze") and premiere of Emina's new single "Opet si sa njom"

Contestants' performances on the second live show
Act	Order	Song	Result
Lukijan Ivanović	1	"Lady"	Safe
4U	2	"Feel"	Bottom two
Aleksandra Brković	3	"More pelina"	Safe
Maja Novaković	4	"Girl on Fire"	Bottom two
Haris Ćato	5	"All Around the World"	Safe
Tamara Milanović	6	"What Now"	Safe
H2O	7	"Monday Morning"	Safe
Doktori	8	"Story of My Life"	Safe
Ilma Karahmet	9	"Grenade"	Safe
Daniel Kajmakoski	10	"Čija si"	Safe
Aleksandra Sekulić	11	"Parachute"	Safe
Aleksa Perović	12	"Anđeo"	Safe
Sing-off details
Maja Novaković	1	"Umirem 100 puta dnevno"	Eliminated
4U	2	"Nedostaješ mi"	Safe

Judges' votes to eliminate

- Joksimović: 4U - backed his own act, Maja Novaković
- Kovač: Maja Novaković - backed her own act, 4U
- Lesendrić: Maja Novaković - gave no reason
- Jahović: Maja Novaković - thought that 4U performed better, although she also thought neither act practiced enough

==== Week 3 (21 January) ====
- Theme: Serbian, Bosnian, Macedonian, Croatian and Montenegrin songs
- Musical guest: Jelena Tomašević ("Panta rei" and "Radio svira za nas")

Contestants' performances on the third live show
Act	Order	Song	Result
Ilma Karahmet	1	"Ne dam na tebe"	Safe
Doktori	2	"Cesarica"	Safe
Maid Hećimović	3	"Pisaću joj pisma duga"	Safe
Tamara Milanović	4	"Mi nismo sami"	Safe
Haris Ćato	5	"Što ti dadoh"	Safe
Aleksandra Sekulić	6	"E7/9"	Bottom two
Daniel Kajmakoski	7	"Sonce ne me gree"	Safe
H2O	8	"Čuvam te"	Bottom two
Aleksa Perović	9	"Voli me i ne voli me"	Safe
4U	10	"Točkovi"	Safe
Aleksandra Brković	11	"Zbunjena"	Safe
Lukijan Ivanović	12	"Sve moje zore"	Safe
Sing-off details
Aleksandra Sekulić	1	"Odlazim a volim te"	Safe
H2O	2	"I Follow Rivers"	Eliminated

Judges' votes to eliminate

- Kovač: Aleksandra Sekulić - backed her own act, H2O
- Lesendrić: H2O - backed his own act, Aleksandra Sekulić
- Joksimović: H2O - claimed that Sekulić sang really well and went for "all or nothing" in the Sing-off
- Jahović: H2O - said that Sekulić's performance in the Sing-off was her best one throughout the competition

==== Week 4 (28 January) ====
- Theme: Contestants' choice
- Musical guest: Jelena Rozga ("Nirvana" and "Cirkus") and Doris Dragović ("Marija Magdalena")

Contestants' performances on the fourth live show
Act	Order	Song	Result
Daniel Kajmakoski	1	"Counting Stars"	Safe
Aleksandra Brković	2	"Zbog tebe" / "Tek je 12 sati"	Bottom two
Aleksa Perović	3	"Bailamos"	Safe
Aleksandra Sekulić	4	"Kao da me nema"	Bottom two
Doktori	5	"Happy"	Safe
Ilma Karahmet	6	"Nisam anđeo"	Safe
Maid Hećimović	7	"Stvari lagane"	Safe
4U	8	"Summertime Sadness"	Safe
Lukijan Ivanović	9	"Love Me Again"	Safe
Haris Ćato	10	"Sve je laž"	Safe
Tamara Milanović	11	"Jar of Hearts"	Safe
Sing-off details
Aleksandra Brković	1	"Turning Tables"	Safe
Aleksandra Sekulić	2	"Sve još miriše na nju"	Eliminated

Judges' votes to eliminate

- Lesendrić: Aleksandra Sekulić - both acts were in his category, but thought that Brković performed better
- Kovač: Aleksandra Sekulić - said that Brković was better both in the Sing-Off and throughout the competition
- Jahović: Aleksandra Sekulić - thought that both acts performed average and added that it is difficult to win a Sing-Off against Brković
- Joksimović: did not need to vote as there already was a majority, however decided to give his vote to Sekulić in support of her future endeavours

==== Week 5 (4 February) ====
- Theme: Dance night
- Musical guest: Loreen ("My Heart Is Refusing Me" and "Euphoria")

Contestants' performances on the fifth live show
Act	Order	Song	Result
Maid Hećimović	1	"Krasiva"	Safe
Haris Ćato	2	"Billie Jean"	Bottom two
Ilma Karahmet	3	"Mercy"	Safe
Doktori	4	"Freedom"	Safe
Aleksandra Brković	5	"Where Have You Been"	Safe
Aleksa Perović	6	"Ai Se Eu Te Pego"	Safe
Daniel Kajmakoski	7	"Wake Me Up"	Safe
Lukijan Ivanović	8	"Ludak kao ja"	Safe
Tamara Milanović	9	"Umbrella"	Safe
4U	10	"When Love Takes Over"	Bottom two
Sing-off details
Haris Ćato	1	"Cry Me a River"	Safe
4U	2	"California King Bed"	Eliminated

Judges' votes to eliminate

- Kovač: Haris Ćato - backed her own act, 4U
- Jahović: 4U - backed her own act, Haris Ćato
- Joksimović: 4U - said both acts were good but opted to keep Ćato in the competition
- Lesendrić: Haris Ćato - could not decide so chose to take it to deadlock

With the acts in the bottom two receiving two votes each, the result was deadlocked and reverted to the earlier public vote.4U was eliminated as the act with the fewest public votes

==== Week 6 (18 February) ====
The sixth live show was scheduled to be broadcast on 11 February, but because a flu epidemic struck both contestants and the production crew, it was postponed for a week. Instead of the live show, the producer decided to broadcast the special, "Meet you favourite".

- Theme: Ballads
- Musical guest: Kaliopi ("Oprosti" and "Crno i belo")

Contestants' performances on the sixth live show
Act	Order	Song	Result
Tamara Milanović	1	"Skinny Love"	Safe
Daniel Kajmakoski	2	"Stay"	Safe
Lukijan Ivanović	3	"Brod u boci"	Bottom two
Ilma Karahmet	4	"Hurt"	Safe
Haris Ćato	5	"Nije htjela"	Bottom two
Maid Hećimović	6	"Ostani"	Safe
Aleksa Perović	7	"Pogledi u tami"	Safe
Doktori	8	"With or Without You"	Safe
Aleksandra Brković	9	"Back to Black"	Safe
Sing-off details
Lukijan Ivanović	1	"Recovery"	Safe
Haris Ćato	2	"Dušo moja"	Eliminated

Judges' votes to eliminate

- Joksimović: Haris Ćato - wished the best of luck to both contestants in the future and chose to keep Ivanović in the competition
- Lesendrić: Haris Ćato - said that he highly respects Ivanović's ability as a music arranger
- Kovač: Lukijan Ivanović - decided to save Ćato, despite her opinion that he was perpetually guided down the wrong path by his mentor
- Jahović: Lukijan Ivanović - both acts were in her category and therefore could not decide and chose to take it to deadlock

With the acts in the bottom two receiving two votes each, the result was deadlocked and reverted to the earlier public vote. Cato was eliminated as the act with the fewest public votes.

==== Week 7 (25 February) ====
- Theme: Songs from movies and TV shows
- Musical guest: Dejan Cukić ("Prava ljubav") and Tropico Band ("Sreća")

After the voting lines were closed producers announced that they decided on eliminating two contestants this week. The act with the fewest votes would be eliminated without participating in the sing off, while second and third to last placed acts would sing for survival.

Contestants' performances on the seventh live show
Act	Order	Song	Movie/TV show	Result
Aleksa Perović	1	"A sad adio"	Vruć vetar	Bottom two
Maid Hećimović	2	"Floyd"	Nacionalna klasa	Bottom two
Ilma Karahmet	3	"I Need To Know"	Barbie as the Island Princess	Safe
Daniel Kajmakoski	4	"Unchained Melody"	Ghost	Safe
Lukijan Ivanović	5	"Ain't No Sunshine"	Notting Hill	Safe
Aleksandra Brković	6	"Reflection"	Mulan	Eliminated
Doktori	7	"I'll Be There for You"	Friends	Safe
Tamara Milanović	8	"Skyfall"	Skyfall	Safe
Sing-off details
Aleksa Perović	1	"Here Without You"		Eliminated
Maid Hećimović	2	"Ostala si uvijek ista"		Safe

Judges' votes to eliminate

- Jahović: Maid Hećimović - backed her own act, Aleksa Perović
- Joksimović: Aleksa Perović - backed his own act, Maid Hećimović
- Lesendrić: Maid Hećimović - said that he likes both acts, but decided to keep Perović
- Kovač: Aleksa Perović - claimed she had to listen to her heart and send Perović home

==== Week 8 (4 March) ====
- Theme: Judges' songs
- Musical guest: Parni Valjak ("Nakon svih godina" and "Samo da znaš"), Nataša Bekvalac ("Najgora"), Ana Stanić ("Ovaj dan") and Slavko Kalezić ("Krivac")

Contestants' performances on the eighth live show
Act	Order	Song	Result
Maid Hećimović	1	"Nije ljubav stvar"	Bottom two
Ilma Karahmet	2	"Kao ptica na mom dlanu"	Bottom two
Doktori	3	"Da te volim"	Safe
Lukijan Ivanović	4	"Još ti se nadam"	Safe
Tamara Milanović	5	"Slučajno"	Safe
Daniel Kajmakoski	6	"Ljubavi"	Safe
Sing-off details
Maid Hećimović	1	"Odiseja"	Safe
Ilma Karahmet	2	"Korake ti znam"	Eliminated

Judges' votes to eliminate

- Joksimović: Ilma Karahmet - backed his own act, Maid Hećimović
- Lesendrić: Maid Hećimović - backed his own act, Ilma Karahmet
- Kovač: Ilma Karahmet - stated that Karahmet was still too young and that she doesn't feel emotion when Karahmet sings
- Jahović: Ilma Karahmet - said that she "knows what it means to be 30 and not have a song of your own"

==== Final week (23 March) ====
- Musical guest: Marija Šerifović ("Ja volim svoj greh"), Tijana Dapčević ("To the sky"), Kiki Lesendrić & Piloti ("Kada sanjamo") and Madlick ("Hey, Yoko Ono" and "We are the future")

Contestants' performances on the final live show
Act	Order	First song	Order	Second song	Order	Third song	Order	Fourth song	Result
Doktori	1	" Troublemaker/Just the Way You Are"	N/A	N/A – already eliminated	N/A	N/A – already eliminated	N/A	N/A – already eliminated	Fifth Place
Lukijan Ivanović	2	"Don't You Worry Child"	N/A	N/A – already eliminated	N/A	N/A – already eliminated	N/A	N/A – already eliminated	Fourth Place
Daniel Kajmakoski	3	"Sex on Fire"	1	"Angels"	1	"The Hardest Thing"	1	"Red"	Winner
Maid Hecimović	4	"Kao moja mati"	2	"Eh, da je tuga snijeg"	N/A	N/A – already eliminated	N/A	N/A – already eliminated	Third Place
Tamara Milanović	5	"Wrecking Ball"	3	"Ja bih te sanjala"	2	"Run"	2	"Don't You Remember"	Runner-up

== Reception ==
=== Controversy and criticism ===
==== LGBT discrimination accusations ====
When Fifi Janevska (assigned male at birth) stepped on stage during the auditions, she was asked by Kristina if she wanted to be referred to as male or female. After Fifi said that she wanted to be referred to as female, Željko asked how could he refer to her as female when "she is male". When Fifi's performance was over, all of the judges gave her a yes, except Željko who said he was shocked. When commenting on the performance, Željko refrained from using either male or female pronouns when talking to Fifi. Željko also added he was not conservative which prompted Kristina to ask him "You aren't?". When voting, before giving a no, Željko said: "I don't like it. But you sing good."
After the episode was broadcast, LGBT organisations were outraged and wanted Željko to apologize for the way he acted. Željko responded on Twitter that he doesn't think he did anything wrong and that everyone's entitled to their opinion. The producers have stated that there was no hate speech in the way Željko talked to Fifi.
The situation had minor coverage by websites outside the Adria region - including a community article on BuzzFeed and Huffington Post.

==== Aleksandra Brković's elimination ====
In week 7, when two acts were eliminated, production faced minor criticism from the public for eliminating Aleksandra Brković without giving her a chance to sing for survival. After the voting lines have been closed for that night, Ana Grubin said that two acts would leave the competition, instead of one, without previously announcing the change of the rules. When bottom three were revealed, Ana announced that Aleksandra had the fewest votes and would leave without singing again. When the other two acts performed and judges had to vote which one would stay, some of the judges commented that they thought it was not fair for Aleksandra to leave without being given a chance to fight for her place in the competition.
In the days that followed, a lot of Aleksandra's supporters said that their votes did not get through, or got through after the voting lines were closed. Joksimović also tweeted that he received a lot of complaints from people who had problems with voting that night. Soon after that producers had a press release where they stated there were no problems with the voting lines and that the double elimination was previously used in the British version of the show and was not a thing they made up.

== Episodes ==
#	Stage of competition	Original air date
1	Auditions 1	October 29, 2013
2	Auditions 2	November 5, 2013
3	Auditions 3	November 13, 2013
4	Auditions 4	November 19, 2013
5	Auditions 5	November 26, 2013
6	Auditions Special	December 3, 2013
7	Bootcamp	December 10, 2013
8	Judges' houses (Girls/Boys)	December 17, 2013
9	Judges' houses (Over 27s/Groups)	December 24, 2013
10	Holiday Special	January 2, 2014
11	Live show 1	January 7, 2014
12	Live show 2	January 14, 2014
13	Live show 3	January 21, 2014
14	Live show 4	January 28, 2014
15	Live show 5	February 4, 2014
16	"Meet your favourite" Special	February 11, 2014
17	Live show 6	February 18, 2014
18	Live show 7	February 25, 2014
19	Live show 8	March 4, 2014
20	Final show	March 23, 2014
