= In My Room (disambiguation) =

"In My Room" is a 1963 song by the Beach Boys.

In My Room may also refer to:

== Albums ==
- In My Room (album), by Jacob Collier, 2016
- In My Room, by Judith Lefeber, 2004
- (Alone) In My Room, by Verdelle Smith, 1966; or the title song, covered by several performers
- U mojoj sobi, by Aleksandra Kovač, 2009

== Songs ==
- "In My Room" (Frank Ocean song), 2019
- "In My Room" (Julia Wolf song), 2024
- "In My Room", by Albert Hammond Jr. from ¿Cómo Te Llama?
- "In My Room", by Deep Wound from Demo
- "In My Room", by Dinosaur Pile-Up from Nature Nurture
- "In My Room", by Energy Orchard from Shinola
- "In My Room", by Hawkwind from The Machine Stops
- "In My Room", by Hikaru Utada from First Love
- "In My Room", by In Flames from Battles
- "In My Room", by Insane Clown Posse from Hell's Pit
- "In My Room", by Johnny Farnham, B-side to "Sadie (The Cleaning Lady)"
- "In My Room", by The Last Shadow Puppets from The Age of the Understatement
- "In My Room", by Martin Page from In the House of Stone and Light
- "In My Room", by The Mutton Birds from Salty
- "In My Room", by Ready for the World from Long Time Coming
- "In My Room", by REZ from Civil Rites
- "In My Room", by Shinee from Replay
- "In My Room", by Thousand Foot Krutch from Oxygen: Inhale
- "In My Room", by Troye Sivan featuring Guitarricadelafuente from Something to Give Each Other
- "In My Room", by Wild Orchid from Oxygen
- "In My Room", by Yazoo (Yaz) from Upstairs at Eric's
- "In My Room", by Yellow Claw from Blood for Mercy
- "In My Room", by Zebrahead from Playmate of the Year

== Other uses ==
- In My Room (film), a 2018 German film
- "In My Room" (Grounded for Life), a television episode
- In My Room, a record label imprint founded by Trentemøller
