= Slavko Kalezić =

Montenegrin actor, singer and songwriter (born 1985)

Slavko Kalezić Славко Калезић
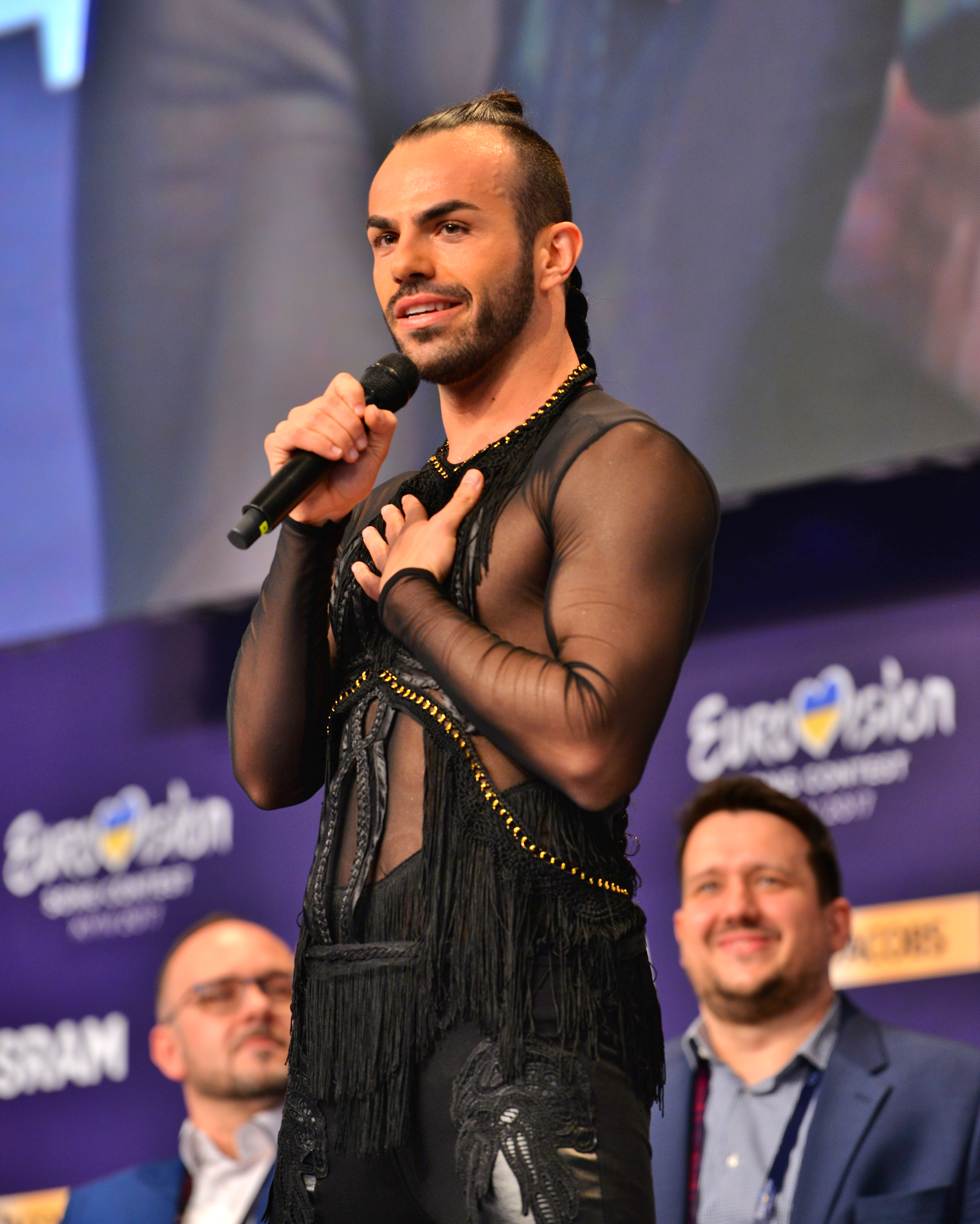
- Kalezić in 2017

Background information
- Born: 4 October 1985 (age 41); Titograd, SR Montenegro, SFR Yugoslavia
- Genres: Pop; R&B; soul
- Occupations: Actor; singer; dancer
- Instrument: Vocals
- Years active: 2011–present
- Website: https://cnp.me/slavko-kalezic/

Slavko Kalezić (Montenegrin: Славко Калезић, pronounced [slǎːʋko kâlezitɕ]; born 4 October 1985) is a Montenegrin actor, singer and songwriter. He took part in X Factor Adria but failed to make it to the live shows. He represented Montenegro in the Eurovision Song Contest 2017 with the song "Space". In 2017, he took part in the fourteenth series of The X Factor UK, where he was eliminated from the competition at judges' houses.

== Beginnings ==
Kalezić studied at the Academy of Performing Arts at Cetinje, Montenegro and later on becoming part of Ensemble of the Montenegrin National Theatre. He played various roles in theater and movies, performed at various music events but also at European Pride shows in Tel Aviv, Stockholm, London, and Madrid. He was invited to return to Madrid for World Pride in the summer of 2017, where he performed in the gala finale held at Puerta de Alcalá alongside other Eurovision Song Contest alumni such as Loreen, Conchita Wurst, Barei, Rosa López, Ruth Lorenzo, Suzy and Kate Ryan. In the promotional season for the 2018 Eurovision Song Contest, Slavko was invited to perform at both the Australian preview parties in Sydney and Melbourne, making him the first artist from the contest to attend these events.

In 2011, Kalezić released the single "Muza".

== Career ==
=== In X Factor Adria ===
In 2013, Kalezić became more prominent by competing in series 1 of X Factor Adria, the Serbian pan-regional version of The X Factor. During the Podgorica, Montenegro auditions, he sang Beyoncé's "End of Time", successfully advancing to the bootcamp for the "Over 27s" category, mentored by Željko Joksimović. He sang "Get Lucky" and "Cosmic Girl", and was then promoted to the Judges' house stage, where he performed "Ljuljaj me nezno", being mentored by Joksimović, who was assisted by Tony Cetinski, but he failed to make it to the live shows and the Top 14.

=== After X Factor Adria ===
In 2014, subsequent to X Factor Adria, Kalezić released the album San o vječnosti. Singles included most notably "Krivac", "Feel the Music" and "Freedom".

=== Eurovision 2017 ===
Kalezić was confirmed to be internally selected as the Montenegrin entrant to the Eurovision Song Contest 2017 with his song, "Space", on 29 December 2016. He represented Montenegro in the Eurovision Song Contest 2017 with the song "Space". It was written by Adis Eminić, Iva Boršić, Momčilo Zeković and produced by Stefan Orn and Jovan Radomir in studios in Stockholm. Montenegro was drawn to compete in the first semi-final of the Eurovision Song Contest which took place on 9 May 2017. Performing during the show in position 6, "Space" was placed 16th in the first semi-final with a total of 56 points and therefore was not in the top 10 entries of the first semi-final, so did not qualify to compete in the final.

=== In The X Factor UK ===
In July 2017, he auditioned for the fourteenth series of the UK The X Factor. During his audition he revealed that judge Louis Walsh, who was also at the Contest in Kyiv as a member of the Irish delegation, advised him to audition. He received a "Yes" from three of the four judges and progressed to Bootcamp. He survived Bootcamp and progressed to Nicole Scherzinger's Judges' House. At Judges' Houses he was not selected by his mentor Nicole Scherzinger to go through to live shows and therefore was eliminated from the competition. He was included as a potential wildcard contestant but did not get enough votes from the public.

The X Factor performances and results
Show	Song choice	Theme	Result
Auditions	"End of Time" – Beyoncé	—N/a	Through to bootcamp round 1
Bootcamp Round 1	Unknown	—N/a	Through to bootcamp round 2
Bootcamp Round 2	"Where Have You Been" - Rihanna	—N/a	Through to six chair challenge
Six-chair challenge	"Little Bad Girl" - David Guetta featuring Taio Cruz and Ludacris	—N/a	Through to judges houses
Judges' houses	"On the Floor" – Jennifer Lopez featuring Pitbull	—N/a	Eliminated

=== Eurovision 2018 ===
Kalezić was invited by RTP and OGAE Portugal to travel to Lisbon and perform at a number of events during the Eurovision Song Contest 2018. Slavko performed remixes of his Eurovision 2017 song "Space" along with new single "El Ritmo" at the Eurofan Café, Wiwijam, Trumps Lisboa and Euroclub. He also attended the semi-final in which Montenegro were competing as well as the Grand Final.

=== Moja Istina ===
In April 2018 Kalezić published a book called Moja Istina (meaning My Truth) documenting his experience at Eurovision 2017 and The X Factor. It was published in Montenegrin with a view to having it translated to English later on. In November 2019, he produced and performed a one-off show at the Ramada Hotel in Podgorica of the same name, telling the story of the book in a musical multi-media show.

=== Eurovision 2019 ===
Kalezić was invited by OGAE Israel to perform at the Eurofan Café during the week of the semi-finals. He stayed for the Grand Final to support the artists competing.

== Discography ==
=== Albums ===
Title
San o vječnosti
Details
- Released: 2014
- Label: N/A
- Format: Digital download, CD
Notes

No.	Title	Length
1.	"Krivac"	4:06
2.	"Kraj"	4:32
3.	"Zašto"	3:39
4.	"Borim se" (featuring Neda Papović)	3:53
5.	"Scena"	3:31
6.	"Nemir"	3:38
7.	"You"	3:55
8.	"Feel the Love"	3:24
9.	"Lavice"	3:41
10.	"Muza"	3:51

=== Singles ===
Title	Year	Album
"Muza"	2011	San o vječnosti
"Krivac"	2014	San o vječnosti
"Feel the Music"	2015	Non-album singles
"Freedom"	2016	Non-album singles
"Space"	2017	Non-album singles
"El Ritmo"	2018	Non-album singles
"Moonlit Night"	2019	Non-album singles
"Love Letter"	2019	Non-album singles

== Filmography ==
- L'homme qui voulait vivre sa vie (2010)
- Lokalni vampir (2011)
- Budva na pjenu od mora (2012/2014) - Roman
- The Kids from the Marx and Engels Street (2014) - Fake prostitute

== Awards ==
Year	Award	Category	Result
2017	Barbara Dex Award	"Worst Dressed" artist	Won

Preceded by Highway with "The Real Thing"	Montenegro in the Eurovision Song Contest; 2017	Succeeded by Vanja Radovanović with "Inje"
