= Highway (Montenegrin band) =

Montenegrin band

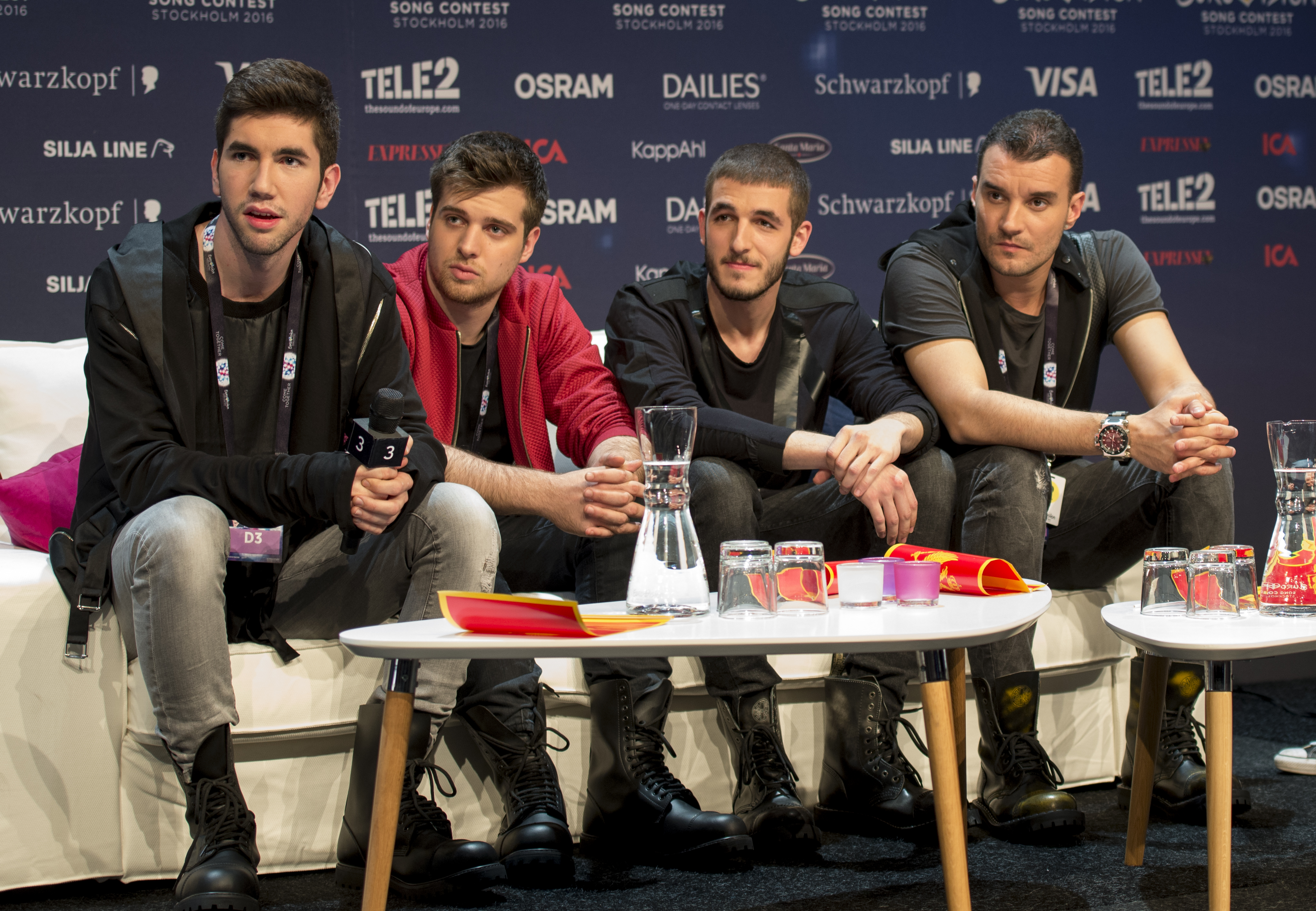
- Highway in 2016

Background information
- Origin: Podgorica, Montenegro
- Genres: Alternative rock, rock, soft rock, power pop
- Years active: 2015–present
- Members: Petar Tošić; Marko Pešić; Luka Vojvodić
- Past members: Bojan Jovović

Highway is a Montenegrin band. They participated in the second series of X Factor Adria in 2015, and ended in fourth place. The band consists of lead singer Petar Tošić, guitarists and back-up singers Marko Pešić and Luka Vojvodić.

They represented Montenegro at the Eurovision Song Contest 2016 in Stockholm. with "The Real Thing". They performed on May 10, 2016 during the first semi-final of the contest, but failed to qualify to the May 14 final.

Awards and achievements
Preceded by Knez with "Adio"	Montenegro in the Eurovision Song Contest; 2016	Succeeded by Slavko Kalezić with "Space"
