= Med i mleko =

Studio album by Aleksandra Kovač
- Released: 2006
- Recorded: 2006
- Genre: R&B, Soul, Pop
- Length: 36:23
- Label: Komuna
- Producer: Aleksandra Kovač

Aleksandra Kovač chronology
Med i mleko (2006)	U mojoj sobi (2009)

Singles from Med i mleko
- 1. "Ti" Released: 2006; 2. "C'mon Boy" Released: 2006; 3. "Nemoj ovako" Released: 2007

Professional ratings
Review scores
Source	Rating
Popboks	5/10 stars

Med i mleko (translation: "Honey and Milk") is the first solo album from Aleksandra Kovač, a Serbian R&B performer. It was released in Serbia and Europe in spring 2006.

Her first single reached #2 on MTV Adria Top 20 (beaten by Gnarls Barkley'S "Crazy"). Her second single, "C'mon Boy" reached #11 on MTV Adria Top 20. However, her third single from the album, "Nemoj ovako", didn't reach the charts. The third single has been released in January 2007. None of the 3 singles were released as CD singles, but only like videos.

== Track list ==
1. "Intro" — 0:39
2. "Ti" — 3:55
3. "C'mon Boy" — 3:16
4. "Lutrija" — 3:22
5. "Nije nam vreme" — 5:29
6. "Da te volim" — 3:21
7. "A.K.'s Black Balls" — 3:37
8. "Love Operator" — 3:33
9. "Nemoj ovako" — 4:52
10. "Ovde ti je dom" — 4:19
