= K2 (Serbian band) =

Serbian pop duo

K2 К2
- Origin: Belgrade, Serbia, FR Yugoslavia
- Genres: Eurodance; Europop; pop; dance-pop; happy hardcore; R&B; funk
- Years active: 1990–1998
- Labels: Mismanagement; Komuna; EMI
- Past members: Aleksandra Kovač; Kristina Kovač

K2 (Serbian Cyrillic: К2) was a Serbian pop, R&B, funk and dance duo, formed by sisters Aleksandra and Kristina Kovač in 1990. They worked with many producers worldwide and released five albums. After eight years, the band finished its work in 1998. Aleksandra and Kristina started their solo careers.

== Group history ==
=== Beginning ===
Aleksandra (born 1972) and Kristina (born 1974) are the daughters of Kornelije Kovač, a famous composer, and his wife Spomenka, who is a songwriter. They have younger sister, Anja (1988), who is an actress. Aleksandra and Kristina started playing piano when they were very young, so they knew that their job will be - music. Aleksandra decided she would be singer when she "heard music from the movie Grease for the first time", in 1978.

Aleksandra and Kristina formed their band, named K2. They signed their first contract with a management company from London, Misamanagement (clients include Supertramp, Rod Stewart and Chris de Burgh). They went to London to support Labi Siffre on tour and performed in many famous clubs in London, such as "Mean Fiddler", "The Orange" and "Tea Room des Artistes".

In 1993, Errol Brown (former singer of Hot Chocolate) booked the sisters as an opening act and as backing vocals on his tour, after hearing them perform in "Mean Fiddler". After the tour, the sisters began a collaboration with "New Underground", a team of young producers from Manchester, which resulted in several songs that are a mix of pop music and R&B. With this, K2 generated positive reactions from major record labels - Sony Music, Polydor and Warner Bros. Records.

In the following years, Aleksandra and Kristina worked with many important names from the music industry, such as Derek Bramble (a composer and producer, who worked with Whitney Houston and Nona Gaye) and the composing duo Rod Argent-Peter Van Hook (who composed and produced for Genesis and Tanita Tikaram).

=== Two successful albums in Yugoslavia ===
In 1995, the girls returned to their hometown Belgrade and, filled with positive energy and creativity, wrote, arranged, produced and performed their first album K2, which became very popular. They successfully promoted this album in Serbia and former Yugoslavia. Their singles were "'Ajmo u život", "Džangl Manija" and "Milo moje".

In 1996, they released their second album, Malo Soula (A Little Bit of Soul), with singles "Dabadamdam", "Sestre" and "Biću tvoja devojka". At the time, these two albums, as well as the videos for the singles, represented something new, original and fresh in Yugoslavia.

=== Album for Spanish market and break-up ===
A year later, in 1997, Aleksandra and Kristina took the offer from EMI label to record an album for Spain. In 1997, the girls went to Madrid, and signed a contract with EMI to release an album for the Spanish market. The album they eventually released consisted of Spanish-language versions of their previous songs. For example, their #1 hit "Dabadamdam" became "Debedamdam", "Sestre" became "Hermanas", "Ajmo u život" became "Vamos de fiesta" etc. The same year the remix album called "Vamos de fiesta - Remixes" was also released for EMI. Kristina however, later said that this collaboration was "the worst thing that happened to the group".

After album promotion followed by a modest tour, the group returned to Belgrade and disbanded.

== Solo careers ==
Aleksandra recorded the song "Better or Worse" in 2002, but her album Med i mleko was released in 2006. It was one of the best selling albums in 2006. For this album, Aleksandra won the Best Adriatic Act award at MTV Europe Music Awards 2006 in Copenhagen.

Kristina released her solo album U nebranom grožđu in 2007, becoming one of the most popular solo singers in Serbia. Her album is one of the best selling albums in 2007 and 2008 in Serbia.

The two sisters have not been in good terms since 2014, and they have occasionally clashed on social media.

== Discography ==
=== Studio albums ===
- K2 (1995)
- Malo Soula (1996)
