= Kristina Kovač =

Serbian singer and composer

Kristina Kovač Кристина Ковач
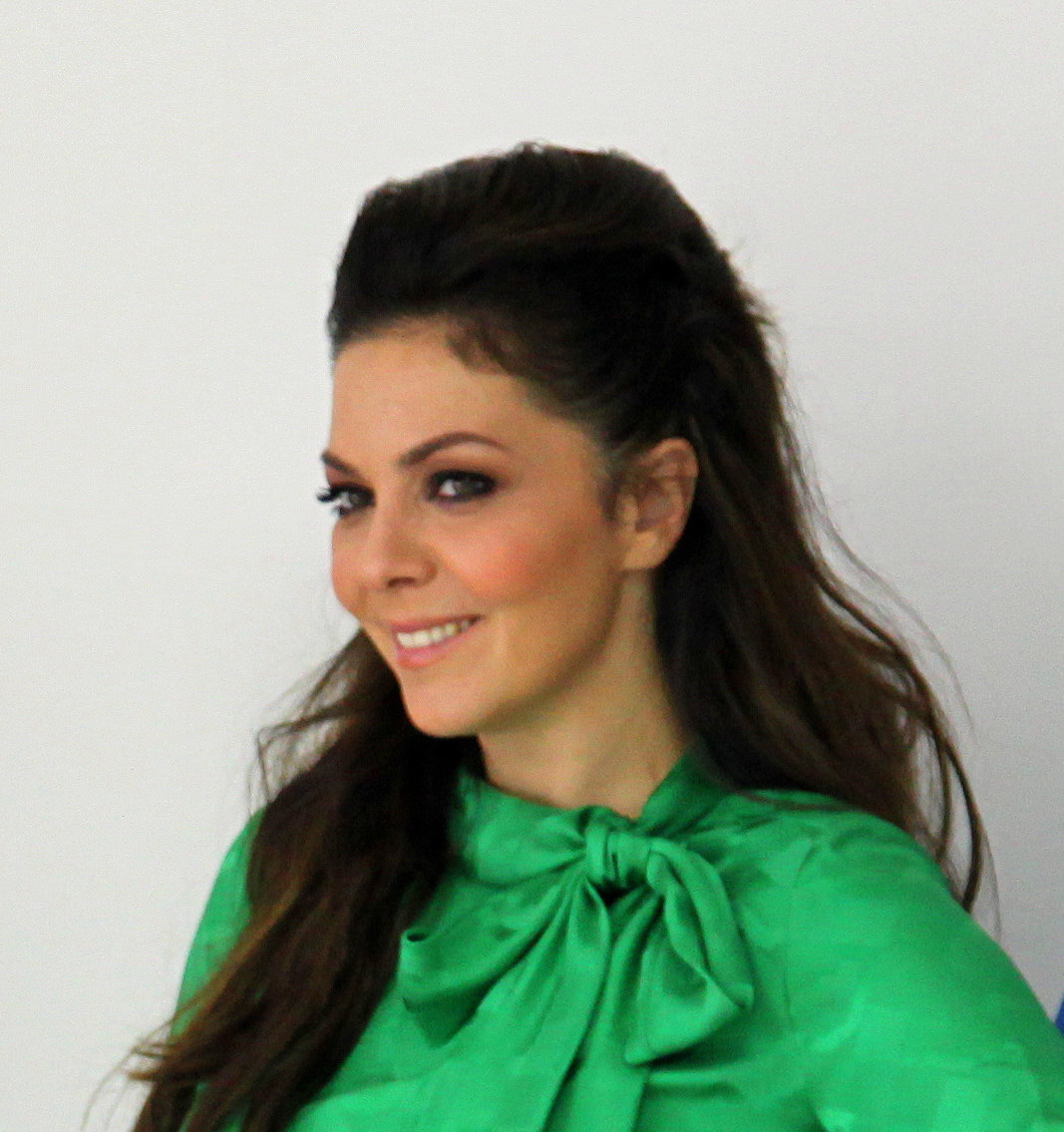
- Kovač in September 2013

Background information
- Born: Kristina Kovač; 10 November 1974 (age 51); Belgrade, SR Serbia, SFR Yugoslavia
- Genres: Pop; R&B; Latin pop
- Occupations: Singer; songwriter
- Years active: 1990–present
- Labels: Komuna; EMI; KK Pro.
- Formerly of: K2

Kristina Kovač (Serbian Cyrillic: Кристина Ковач, pronounced [kristǐːna kôʋatʃ]; born 10 November 1974) is a Serbian singer and composer. She became famous during the 1990s when she and her sister Aleksandra Kovač were a big attraction in Serbia and surrounding countries – R&B band K2. She got back in the spotlight in 2007, thanks to her hit-single "Kolena" which spent more than 15 weeks at No. 1 on Serbian pop-rock charts and also entered MTV Adria Top 20.

She was one of the judges on the first series of X Factor Adria.

== Biography ==
Kristina Kovač was born in Belgrade, Serbia, SFR Yugoslavia in 1974. She is the daughter of the prominent Serbian composer Kornelije Kovač and songwriter Spomenka Kovač. She has two sisters: Aleksandra (b. 1972) and Anja (b. 1988).

Kristina travelled a lot while she was a child and also lived in many places in Europe, such as London. She worked in London for the management company Mismanagement until the second half of the 1990s.

In 2019, Kristina moved to Stockholm, Sweden with her family.

Since 2014, she has not been in good terms with her sister Aleksandra, and the two have occasionally clashed on social media.

== Career ==
=== Popularity and stardom ===
Kristina become popular with the group K2 where she performed along with her sister Aleksandra. They have released four albums. In 1989, under their father's guidance, using the name Next of kin the girls recorded an English language album Way to the top in Spain. The album was also released in their home country in 1990, but failed to make much of a splash without proper media support. In 1991, the duo sang back vocals for Bebi Dol who represented Yugoslavia at the 1991 Eurovision Song Contest. They moved to London in September 1991 to support Labi Siffre on tour. Towards the end of the year they came back to Belgrade, before departing for Norway in the summer of 1992 where, under the name You dirty sisters they recorded promo material for the composer Sway. The year 1993 brought another trip to England where the sisters performed in various London clubs such as Mean Fiddler, The Orange and Tea Room des Artistes. After hearing them perform in Mean Fiddler in 1993, Errol Brown (the former singer of Hot Chocolate) booked Aleksandra and Kristina as an opening act and as backing vocals on his tour. For this occasion they performed as The Cornelias. With this, K2 got positive reactions from major records labels – Sony, Polydor and Warner Bros. In the next five years, Aleksandra and Kristina worked with many important names from the music industry, such as Derek Bramble (composer and producer, worked with Whitney Houston, Nona Gaye) and the composing duo Rod Argent-Peter Van Hooke (composed and produced for Genesis, Tanita Tikaram). Their first album Ajmo u zivot released for Komuna Belgrade in 1995 was very popular and the girls became famous. They released a few videos – such as Ajmo u zivot, Dzangl manija, Milo moje. All of them were No. 1 on Serbian pop-rock charts. Only a year later the girls started making new material for their second album. The second album, called Malo soula was released in late 1996 and still had No. 1 singles. The girls also did several videos – Dabadamdam, Sestre, Bicu tvoja devojka. In 1997 Komuna Belgrade, their label released a compilation album Time out which contained 2 new K2 songs and some other songs by other Serbian hip hop artists. A video for Srebro i zlato was released and became one of the group's biggest hits. Due to being the biggest Serbian attraction, K2 released an album in Spain in Spanish for EMI in 1998. The debut Spanish album was named just K2 and was successful. It contained Spanish versions of their previous songs. For example, their No. 1 hit Dabadamdam became Debedamdam, Sestre became Hermanas, Ajmo u zivot became Vamos de fiesta etc. The same year the remix album called Vamos de fiesta – Remixes was also released for EMI.

=== Hiatus, break, split up ===
In 1997, they released a compilation with Serbian hip hop artists, which also included two new K2 songs: "Srebro i zlato", and "Da li znaš". A video for Srebro i zlato was also released. In later days, turbo folk music got more attention in Serbia, so the girls split up and started doing solo projects.

=== Behind the scenes ===
Kristina started focusing mainly on composing. She composed melodies for many advertisements, and also formed the boy band Peti element in 2001 which was quite popular in those days. She also wrote music for many famous singers – from Tanja Banjanin to Karolina Gočeva. But, in 2005 she did the music for the movie Mi nismo anđeli 2 which was the biggest movie of 2005 in Serbia. She also sang one song Šta se dobije kad se dva anđela klade but it was not released as a single nor got any media attention. Those days she also performed the song Pesma za kraj and also made a video—it's one of her most important songs. Some journalists wondered if that song was meant for K2, although it was clear that it was finally a solo Kristina Kovač song.

=== Going solo ===
Kovač started working on her debut album in the summer of 2006. The album was called U Nebranom Grožđu and KK Production released it in the summer of 2007. The album contains ten songs. All songs were produced and written by her. The album features the Croatian band Cubismo, and Vinnie Colaiuta (drums, played with Sting, Eros Ramazzoti, Anastacia, Pussycat Dolls), Dominic Miller (guitar, Sting’s "right hand") and Paul Turner (bass for Jamiroquai and Annie Lennox) also did some instrument playing on the album. Her first single was "Kolena", the biggest summer hit of 2007 in Serbia. It was a Latin pop song and featured Cubismo. The single spent nine weeks at No.1. "Kolena" reached the MTV Adria Top 20. The second single was "Zivot je ljut", which is Kovač's favourite song off the album, according to her. The video and the song are about love and heartbreak. Kovač's fans were also able to take part in the making of "Zivot je ljut" video. The second single also reached MTV Adria Top 20, and was more successful on the chart than the previous single, "Kolena". The video gained popularity and won awards, such as the award for the best video on Beovizija 2009 and Suncane skale festivals. Kristina chose "Milica i ja" as the third single and made an unofficial statement on her official forum that her fans would be able to be in the video too. But, Kovač got pregnant during late 2007, and the release and filming of the video was scrapped. Kristina stated that she would "not film a video for Milica i ja" and that she will do a video for Ko instead, a fan and critic favourite. The video was not filmed, and Kovač gave birth to a girl called Tara on 1 July 2008. Her pregnancy remained almost publicly unnoticed, since Kristina did not want to make it "a public thing". After giving birth, Kovač started to work on the organisation of her first concert in Belgrade and also continued to work on the story of the Ko video.

== Discography ==
=== With K2 ===
- K2 (1995)
- Malo Soula (1996)
- Vamos de Fiesta (1998)
- Vamos de Fiesta: Remix (1998)

=== Solo ===
- U nebranom grožđu (2007)

=== Composer ===
- Mi nismo Anđeli Soundtrack (2005)
- Krčmarica Mirandolina
