= Stefan Koković =

Stefan Koković Стефан Коковић
- Birth name: Стефан Коковић
- Born: 27 September 1990 (age 34); Belgrade, SR Serbia
- Origin: Belgrade
- Occupation(s): Artist, fashion photographer
- Website: www.stefankokovic.com

Stefan Kokovic (born 27 September 1990 in Belgrade) is a Serbian artist, fashion photographer and media personality, who is based in Austria, specifically Vienna, and works with well known Austrian fashion celebrities.

== Early life ==
Stefan Koković was born in Belgrade in a family that played a significant role in forming his interest in art. He graduated graphic design and soon after turned to photography and started working as photographer's assistant. Stefan became well known in his native country as a young, ambitious artist who worked with many local celebrities, fashion brands and magazines. His work has been presented through many solo-exhibitions.

== Career ==
=== Photography and Graphic Design ===
In a 2015 interview with Esquire Magazine, he explained his approach to photography: "I am all about emotion. To me; the most important thing is to create a connection between the viewer and the photograph"

2010 – 2011: Photography Exhibition – They lived happily ever after...and back.

2012 – 2013: Photography Exhibition – All The Way

2015 - 2016: Photography Exhibition - L'Art pour L'Art

2015 - 2016: Photography Exhibition - Catturare un Momento

2019 - 2020: Photography Exhibition - Rot

2022 - 2023: Photography Exhibition - Faces

His photography has been for several famous Austrian models and cultural figures, most notably Eurovision Song Contest winning Drag Queen and LGBT icon Conchita, who has described him as “bringing a picture in his mind to life in an effortless and clear way”.

=== Music Career and Media ===
As a young boy, Stefan went to a music school, but after family tragedy he decided to change his path. At the age of 22 he was a contestant in a talent show franchise of The X Factor – X Faktor Adria. Even with a noticeable music success, he stopped singing after moving to Austria in 2016.
