= Aleksa Perović =

Serbian singer-songwriter

- Алекса Перовић
- Born: 28 September 1995 (age 31); Kraljevo, FR Yugoslavia
- Citizenship: Serbian
- Occupation: Singer
- Years active: 2014–present

Aleksa Perović (Serbian: Алекса Перовић, born 28 September 1995) is a Serbian singer-songwriter.

== Early life ==
Perović graduated from the Nikola Tesla Electrical Engineering School in Kraljevo, after which he graduated from in studies at Megatrend University in Belgrade. In June 2016, Perović joined the Serbian People's Party.

== Career ==
As a middle school student, Perović was engaged in singing and recitation. He presented his school at the district review of the recitation competition in Raška on 27 April 2012. During his final years of high school, Perović participated in X Factor Adria series 1, and reached the final under mentor Emina Jahović. With this, he gained the status of one of the more popular musicians in his city.

Perović debuted as a singer 2014 with the album Neću da se zaljubim (Serbian: Нећу да се заљубим, lit. 'I'm Not Going to Fall in Love'). The following year, in 2015, he made a comeback with another album titled Voleti ne prestajem (Serbian: Волети не престајем, lit. 'I Don't Love to Stop'), for which himself wrote its lyrics.

Perović subsequently participated in Zvezde Granda season 11, where he was selected as the best competitor according to the jury's assessment. Following his participation success, Perović was given a reception with the assistant mayor of Kraljevo, Sreten Jovanović. In October 2017, he released his single, "Priznajem" (Serbian Cyrillic: Признајем, lit. 'Admitted'). The following year, Perovic released another single, titled "Šifra" (Serbian: Шифра, lit. 'Code') under Grand Production.

== Personal life ==
During his participation in Zvezde Granda, Perović began a relationship with Milica Pajčin. When they attended an acting school together, he achieved his first role in the play Thessaloniki, directed by Lazar Dubovac. Perović and Pajčin were married with one daughter. In February 2023, the couple announced their divorce.
