= Uzveće =

Uzveće Узвеће (Serbian)
- Village (Selo)
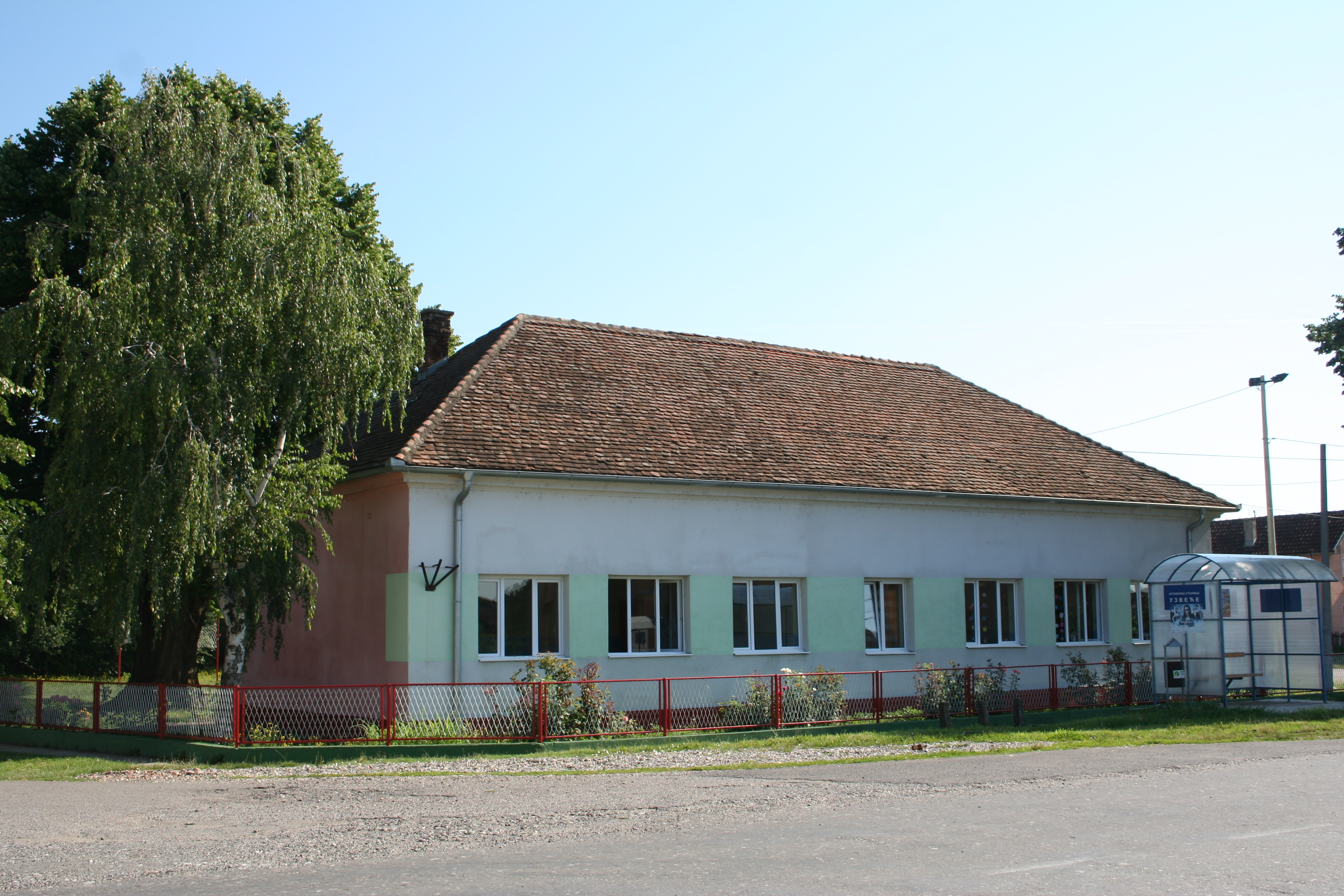

- Location within Serbia
- Coordinates: 44°53′N 19°36′E
- Country: Serbia
- Statistical Region: Šumadija and Western Serbia
- Region: Mačva
- District: Mačva District
- Municipality: Bogatić
- Time zone: UTC+1 (CET)
  - Summer (DST): UTC+2 (CEST)

Uzveće (Serbian Cyrillic: Узвеће, pronounced [ǔzʋɛːt͡ɕɛ]) is a village in Serbia. It is situated in the Bogatić municipality, in the Mačva District. The village has a Serb ethnic majority and its population numbering 878 people (2022 census).

== See also ==
- List of places in Serbia
- Mačva
