= U mojoj sobi =

Studio album by Aleksandra Kovač
- Released: 2009
- Recorded: 2008–2009
- Genre: Pop
- Length: 53:16
- Label: Komuna
- Producer: Aleksandra Kovač

Aleksandra Kovač chronology
Med i mleko (2006)	U mojoj sobi (2009)

Singles from U mojoj sobi
- 1. "Remembering Love" Released: 2009

U mojoj sobi (Serbian Latin: In My Room) is a second studio album by Serbian pop singer Aleksandra Kovač. It was released in 2009.

The album contains 11 songs, out of which one is sung in Spanish, and one in English language. All the songs off the album were produced by Kovač herself.

== Track list ==
1. "To je to" — 3:47
2. "Hoka hej" — 3:16
3. "Heroj" — 3:15
4. "Nedostaješ mi" — 4:28
5. "Opet sam tu" — 3:53
6. "U jednoj sekundi" — 3:37
7. "Halo?" — 3:45
8. "Cuando No Estas Aqui" — 3:25
9. "U mojoj sobi" — 3:46
10. "Remembering Love" — 3:20
11. "Da li nekad sanjaš san..." — 3:27
