= Baš ti lijepo stoje Suze =

Baš ti ljepo stoje Suze

Studio album by Hari Mata Hari
- Released: July 16, 2001
- Recorded: 2001

Hari Mata Hari chronology
Ja nemam snage da te ne volim (1998)	Baš ti ljepo stoje Suze (2001)	Zakon jačega (2004)

Baš ti ljepo stoje Suze is the name of the tenth album by Hari Mata Hari. It was recorded throughout 2001 and released in July of the same year.

== Track listing ==
1. "Kao Domine"
2. "Zjenico oka moga"
3. "Baš ti ljepo stoje suze"
4. "Sad znam fol"
5. "Kada izgorim"
6. "Ja imam te a k'o da nemam te'"
7. "Zavedi me"
8. "Proklet sam što sve ti opraštam"
9. "Ja odavno nemam razloga za smjeh"
10. "Naći ću sebi nekog na ovom globusu"

== Personnel ==
- Hajrudin Varešanović – vocals
- Karlo Martinović – guitar
- Miki Bodlović – bass, backup vocals
- Izo Kolećić – percussion, and drums
- Emir Mehić – keyboardS
- Dragana Mirković – vocals on 6
- Suljeman Ramadovski – vocals on 4
- Šestan "Droga" Samir – keyboards, synthesizers, programming, harmonica, percussion, backup vocals
