= Bobi Mojsovski =

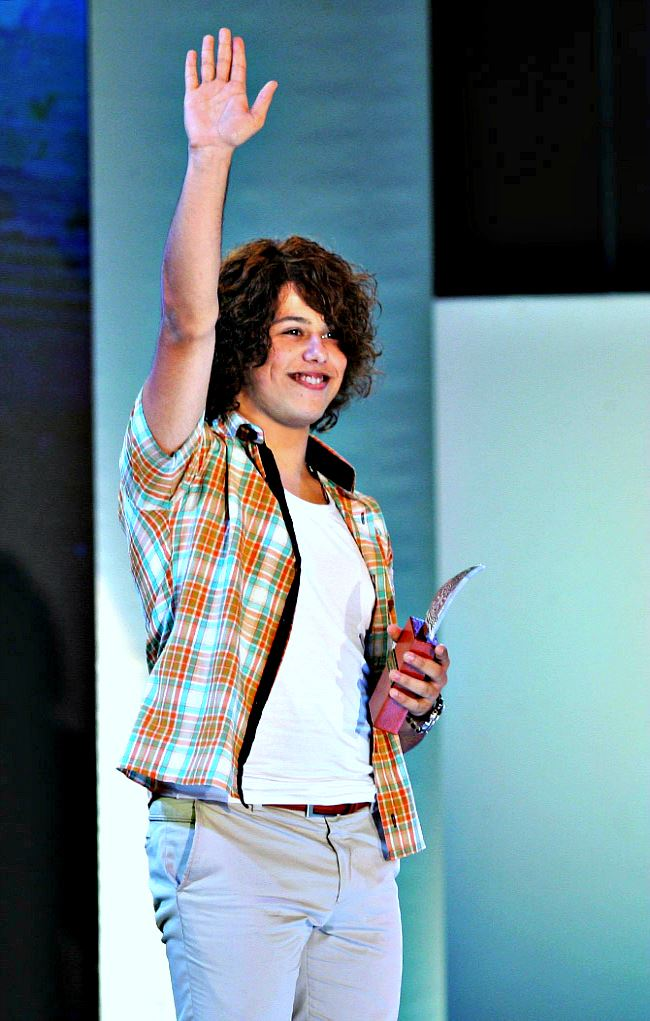
- Bobi Mojsovski

Background information
- Born: Бобан Мојсовски; 21 August 1992 (age 28)
- Origin: Ohrid, Republic of Macedonia
- Genres: Pop, rock, Macedonian traditional music, classical music, hard rock,
- Occupations: Vocalist, musician, songwriter
- Instruments: Vocals, guitar, keyboards
- Years active: 2008–present
- Website: youtube.com/Vengean

Boban Mojsovski (Macedonian: Бобан Мојсовски) is a Macedonian singer from Ohrid who is mostly known as the runner-up of the X Factor Adria 2015 show. Mojsovski is the Grand Prix winner of Slavianski Bazaar in 2012 and the participant of the Macedonian national selection for the Eurovision Song Contest 2011.

== Career ==
Bobi made his first steps in music at the beginning of the summer 2006, when he bought a guitar and started playing it. In September 2006, he joined a band called "Fatamorgana" (Mirage) taking the role of a vocalist and a rhythm guitarist (lead guitarist later on). November 2007, with his band, he participated on MASSUM Olympiad in Skopje, Macedonia where they've won 2nd place, while Bobi was awarded for Best Vocal of the Olympiad. In addition, he was the lyricist and composer of their first single, titled "Ova e Rokenrol" (This is Rock'n'roll). On 16 October 2008, he participated in a charity concert organized by the Red Cross in loving memory of the music legend "Tose Proeski".

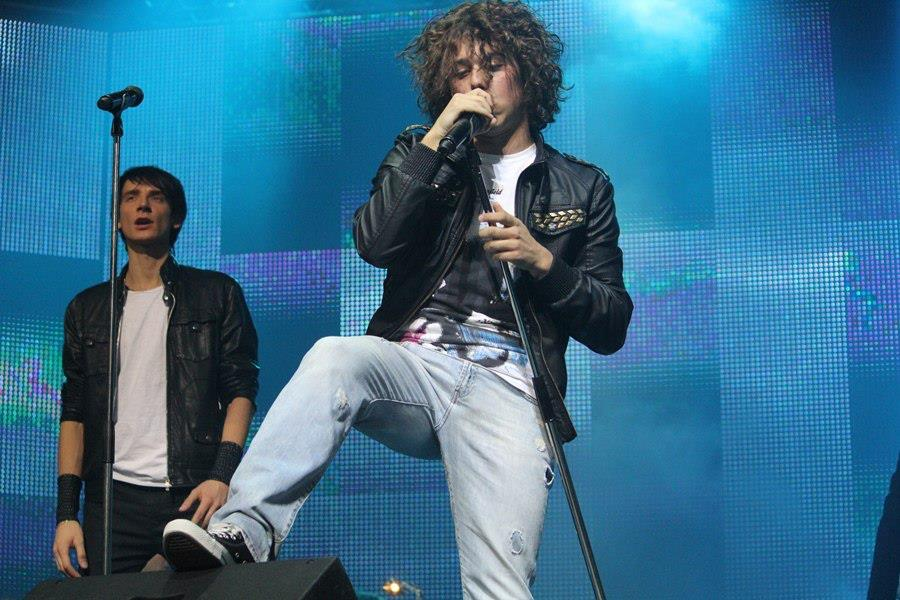
Bobi Mojsovski on the 2nd rock concert in Minsk

Wishing to improve his vocal technique, he worked with the vocal coaches "Brett Manning" (Singing Success) and Joshua Walls who helped him improve, especially in the "Bel Canto" (classical singing) and he was classified as a "Leggiero-Lirico Tenor". In September 2009, Bobi and the bass guitarist formed a new band called "Rocky Road". They also engaged a new drummer.

His first public appearance was in the talent show "MK TALENT" so "Dragan Vucic" (November 2009 – June 2010) where he was awarded 2nd place (vice-champion of the show). A month later, in July 2010, Bobi won 1st place, audience favourite and the Grand Prize of the "Kaneofest 2010" (Macedonian: Канеофест 2010) music festival with his first official single: "Veruvaj mi" Eng. "Believe in me". Bobi performed his song with his ex-band "Rocky Road" under the alias: Bobi&Rocky Road.

A month later (August 2010), he participated at the "Ohridfest 2010" (Macedonian: Охридфест, Охридски трубадури 2010) music festival in Macedonia with his second single "Molitva so bol ljuboven" Eng. "Prayer with a pain of love". He managed to enter the PoP evening of the festival and win 2nd place (televote results).

On 26 February 2011, he performed at the "Macedonian Eurovision Selection festival 2011" with his third single named "Te Krade Toj" Eng. "He's stealing you from me" where he finished 4th (televote results).

On 15 May 2011, Bobi participated in the International Music Festival "Discovery Fest" in Varna, Bulgaria and won 2 prizes: The Special prize for Best Interpretation (Best performer) and 3rd place in the category: Best Song Nomination.

On 12 November 2011, Bobi was invited to be a guest at the Skopje international festival "Eurofest" where he was awarded the Best Vocal Interpretation award.

On 16 July 2012, Bobi was awarded the Grand Prix of Slavianski Bazaar 2012 in Vitebsk, Belarus, which is the 2nd Grand Prix for Republic of Macedonia after 12 years, when Tose Proeski won the first. Shortly after Slavianski Bazaar, in November 2012, Bobi gets the opportunity to participate as the main star on the first rock concert with the Presidential Orchestra of Belarus.

At "Ohridfest 2013" he won 2 awards: Award for best stage performance and 3rd place of Audience in Pop and 5th place in International. In October 2013, Bobi performs again on the "Makfest 2013", presenting a new single called "Zastani" Eng. "Stop".

In August 2014, Bobi participates on the International Art Festival "Lake Pearls" for a second time, again, winning two awards: 1st laureate in the category Estrade vocal & Festival pearl award.

In February 2015, Bobi begins his participation on the regional X Factor Adria show finishing in 2nd place (vice-champion) in June.

On 15 October 2015, Bobi performs on "Veleska Pitijada" cultural festival in Veles and was also invited by the Mayor of Veles to take participation in the introduction of the world's largest pita (food) for Guinness.

On 9 June 2017, Bobi has his first duet with one of the largest hit-makers in the Balkan - "Tonci Huljic", and his band Madre Badessa. They record the song "Ja bi da san opet mali" which is performed on the CMC Festival in Croatia, being followed by a music-video on 12 June 2017.

== Discography ==
=== Album singles ===
- Te krade toj (2011)
- Race vo ogan (2011)
- Ke nema sleden pat (2011)
- Jas i ti (2013)
- Lavina (2013)
- Zastani (2013)
- Pogledni vo mene (2015)
- Januari (2016)
- Ja bi da san opet Mali (2017) duet with Tonci Huljic & Madre Badessa
- Pravo vreme (2017)

=== Singles ===
- Veruvaj mi (2010)
- Molitva so bol ljuboven (2010)
- Smile (2016)

== Awards ==
- MASSUM Olympiad – (Best vocals award) in Skopje 2007
- MK TALENT SHOW – 2nd place (vice-champion)
- Kaneofest 2010 – 1st place of audience & Grand Prize of the festival
- Ohridfest (Ohridski trubaduri) 2010 – 2nd place in second evening *PoP Evening* (televoting results)
- National Selection for Eurovision 2010, Macedonia – Skopjefest – 4th place of audience & 7th place on total
- Discovery Festival in Varna, Bulgaria (2011) – 1st place for best vocal interpretation and 3rd place for best song category
- International Art Festival "Lake Pearls" (2011) – 1st place in category Estrade Vocal.
- Eurofest 2011 festival – Best Vocal Interpretation award
- Ohridfest (Ohridski trubaduri) 2013 – Best Stage Performance award & 3rd place of audience in PoP evening & 5th place in International Evening
- X Factor Adria 2015–2nd place (vice-champion)

== See also ==
- Macedonia in the Eurovision Song Contest
- Eurovision Song Contest 2011
- Music of the Republic of Macedonia
