= Aleksandra Kovač =

Serbian singer-songwriter (born 1972)

- Александра Ковач
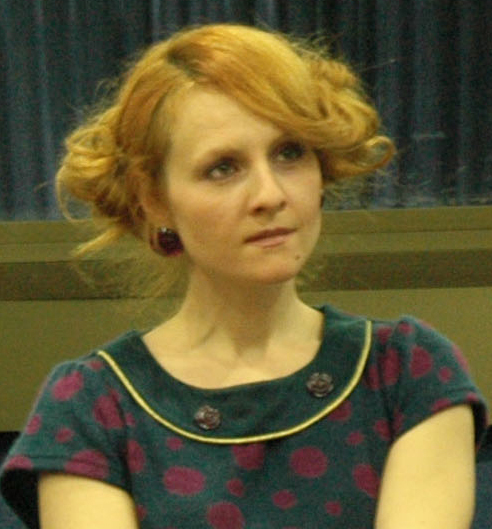
- Born: 30 September 1972 (age 54); Belgrade, SR Serbia, SFR Yugoslavia
- Occupations: Singer; songwriter; producer; TV personality
- Years active: 1990–present
- Father: Kornelije Kovač
- Relatives: Kristina Kovač (sister)
- Musical career
- Genres: Pop; R&B; soul
- Instruments: Vocals; piano
- Labels: Komuna; EMI
- Formerly of: K2

Aleksandra Kovač (Serbian Cyrillic: Александра Ковач, pronounced [aleksǎːndra kôʋatʃ]; born 1972) is a Serbian singer-songwriter, composer, and music producer. She is the eldest daughter of composer Kornelije Kovač and the elder sister of singer Kristina Kovač. Alongside her sister Kristina, Kovač came to media prominence as a part of girl group K2, and then launched a successful solo career in 2001. She won a Best Adriatic Act Award at the MTV Europe Music Awards 2006. She was one of the judges on the second series of X Factor Adria

Kovač holds a Master of Science degree in composition for screen from the University of Edinburgh and a BA in music education from the University of Belgrade. In 2015, she was a BAFTA Scotland New Talent award nominee, and has also won awards for her work in theater, TV, and film. In 2024, Aleksandra was awarded the Order of Karađorđe's Star of third degree, for her merits in the field of music and film.

She scored the off Broadway theater play "Jackie and Marilyn" (April 2014), which premiered at the Lion Theater in Theater Row, New York, to rave reviews, as well as the feature-length documentary "The most important boy in the world" (BELDOCS 2016, IDFA 2016).

== Early and personal life ==
Aleksandra Kovač was born in 1972 to eminent Serbian musicians, composer and music producer Kornelije and songwriter Spomenka Kovač, who died in 2006 of cancer. She has two younger sisters; Kristina, born in 1974, who is also a musician, and Anja, born in 1988, who is an actress. Kovač was born and raised in Belgrade. Surrounded with music throughout her childhood, Kovač began playing the piano aged 15, while already writing her own material since the age of 13. She cites Aretha Franklin, Whitney Houston, and Alicia Keys as her idols, and is also a recognized philanthropist.

Since 2014, she has not been in good terms with her sister Kristina, and the two have occasionally clashed on social media.

== Career ==
=== 1989—1998: K2 ===
In 1989 Kovač and her younger sister Kristina formed a duo named K2, and signed a five-year recording contract with Dave Margereson and Kenny Thompson from Mismanagement, a record label based in London. The same year they supported Labi Sifre at his tour in England. The sister supported Bebi Dol in her song "Brazil" at the Eurovision Song Contest 1991. In 1993 K2 supported Errol Brown from Hot Chocolate on a tour. After the tour, they continued working with Brown's band New Underground, a Manchester based production team, consisting of Robert Maddix and Jonathon Beckford. Working on that project, the sisters discovered soul and funk music, and quickly absorbed the sounds of her Manchester friends’ record collection, which was ripe with old-school soul music, such as Aretha Franklin, Sly Stone, Parliament and Curtis Mayfield. At the same time, Kovač studied classical music at the Belgrade University.

In next five years, K2 worked with great names in music such as Derek Bramble, who worked with Whitney Houston and Nona Gaye, the writing duo Rod Argent, who produced albums for Tanita Tikaram, and many others. After their contract with Mismanagement expired in 1995, the sisters returned to Belgrade and wrote, arranged and produced their debut album K2, that hit number one on the charts. K2 sold more than 70 000 copies, and the band had a successful tour all over the country. Their second album, Malo soula (A little bit of soul), was released in 1996, and hit the charts. In 1997 K2 signed a recording contract with EMI to release an album for the Spanish market, and the sisters traveled to Madrid to record it. In 1998 K2 released their album Vamos de Fiesta. After a successful promotion of the album and a tour, the group returned to Belgrade and stopped working.

=== 1999—present: solo career ===
Kovač's first solo forays came between tours and gigs with her sister. In 1993 she performed in Spain with latino dance group Locomía, playing the keyboards and singing back vocals. She also backed singer Mickael Herzog on his Spanish your.

Soon after K2 stopped performing in late 1990s, Aleksandra decided to continue solo, but now not only as a performer and composer, but as an arranger and producer as well.

In year 2000 she joined forces with music producer and supervisor, Roman Goršek, and founded the music production company RAproduction, which specializes in composing for film and new media, music supervision and production, songwriting, talent search, marketing and vocal coaching. Aleksandra became one of the top songwriters in the south-east European region, writing and producing songs for many of the biggest names in the ex-Yugoslavia music scene.

In 2001 they begin work on the EP "You and Me", which they single-handedly produce and publish. The EP contains four of Aleksandra's soulful, R&B compositions they convey her experiences in love and life through a mix of funk, soul and two-step. In the same year, Aleksandra and Roman are invited by some of the top world managers to come and present their music and work.

They go to Los Angeles and begin a collaboration with John Mason, the leading entertainment lawyer in the US.

Aleksandra has signed publishing contracts with companies such as Air Chrysalis, EMI Spain, Croatia records, Menart and she is a member of HDS and HUZIP in Croatia and STIM in Sweden.

In 2006 she released her first solo album, Med i mleko ("Honey and milk"), and with it, again proved herself as a talented singer and songwriter. Her album was one of the best-selling albums in 2006.

In May 2006, she appeared on the cover of Cosmopolitan Serbia.

On 26 April 2007 Aleksandra held her first concert in Expo sala in Belgrade. The concert was organised by Serbia's freshly launched Fox televizija.

In February 2008 Aleksandra went to Slovenia to collaborate with a band named Leeloojamais. Together they recorded a bilingual song (in Slovenian and Serbian) titled "Mi" ("Us"). Aleksandra has described the collaboration as a "great honor to be on RTV Slovenia participating in the Eurovision Song Contest, and in fact this song received the best response from the audience." The song was written by a Croatian author and it was translated to Slovenian and Serbian by the band and Aleksandra. The song is a single on the Leeloojamais album "Country Club Music".

Concurrent with her songwriting career, Aleksandra garnered acclaim as a composer for commercials, theater, TV and film. She has written several theme songs, the most recent of which are for the 2013 and 2015 Coca-Cola Christmas campaign commercial. Her music can also be heard on commercials for major brands including VIP Mobile, Telekom etc. As a film composer, she was nominated for the European Talent Award at the Soundtrack Cologne festival in 2013., and as one of the authors of the short animated film "Separate lives", for the New Talent Award at the BAFTA Scotland 2015.

As a lecturer in film music, she has given lectures at the American University in Beirut, SAE Institute in Belgrade, Academy of Dramatic Arts in Zagreb, Music Academy in Belgrade, as well as MAKK 2016, Festival of Sound and Film Music - Rovinj 2016, Pedagogical forum 2014, 2015, & 2016. Aleksandra has published her work on film music in the international journal of music "New Sound", University of Osijek international journal “New Theories” and on songwriting and composing in the book "Serbia: My Case, A New European Generation" ( British Council, Serbia ).

She has scored many short animations, short animated films, feature-length documentaries, TV series and theater plays in the past ten years and has been awarded for her work in the field. Aleksandra is also a recognized philanthropist, the founder of the prestigious vocal school and children’s choir "Belgrade Voice”, and an Ambassador for the Council of Europe’s campaign “1 in 5” against child abuse. She wrote the official title song of the campaign called “Stop the silence” and performed it at the Council of Europe in Strasbourg on the 6th of September 2012. She received a commendation from the Serbian Ministry of education for her work in this area.

As one of the most successful singer-songwriters in the region, with best-selling albums and sold-out tours, and a career which spans more than two decades, Aleksandra was asked to become one of the X Factor Adria judges and mentors in 2015, which aired in five Balkan countries.

Aleksandra is fluent in English, Spanish and Serbian.

== Discography ==
=== Albums ===
- 2006 — Med i mleko
- 2009 — U mojoj sobi
- 2016 – Cotton 100%

=== EPs ===
- 2001 — You and Me

=== Singles ===
Year	Title	Album	Notes
2001	"For Better or Worse"	You and Me	
2006	"Ti"	Med i mleko	
2006	"C'Mon Boy"	Med i mleko	
2007	"Nemoj ovako"	Med i mleko	
2009	"Have You Ever Had a Dream"	U mojoj sobi	
2009	"Hoka Hej"		
2013	"Jedna žena"	Jedna žena	As a free download via her website.
2015	"U šaci me imaš"		
2016	"Ljubav"		
2016	"Vrtiš me u krug"		
2017	"Deo po deo"		
2017	"Veruj"		
2020	"Bajka"		
2020	"Mlečni put"		
2020	"Odavde do večnosti"		
2020	"Poljubi me"		

== Movies and TV series ==
Since 2015, she has composed music for hit Serbian TV series and films, such as:

- TV series “Ubice mog oca” (“Legacy”) – Seasons 1,2,3,4,5
- motion picture and TV series “Zaspanka za vojnike” (“A Soldier’s Lullaby”)
- TV series “Državni službenik” (“Civil servant”) – Seasons 1-3
- motion picture and TV series “Dara of Jasenovac” (2021 Serbian candidate for Oscars and Golden Globes)
- TV series “Pevačica” (“The Singer”) – Season 1
- motion picture “Šavovi” (“Stitches”)
- TV series “Slučaj porodice Bošković” (“The case of the Bošković family”) – Seasons 1, 2
- etc.

== Awards and nominations ==
Year	Award	Category	Result
2006	MTV Europe Music Awards	Best Adriatic Act	Won
2010	Serbian Oscar Of Popularity	Best Female Pop Singer	Nominated
2015	British Academy Scotland	New Talent Awards	Nominated
