= Riblja Čorba discography =

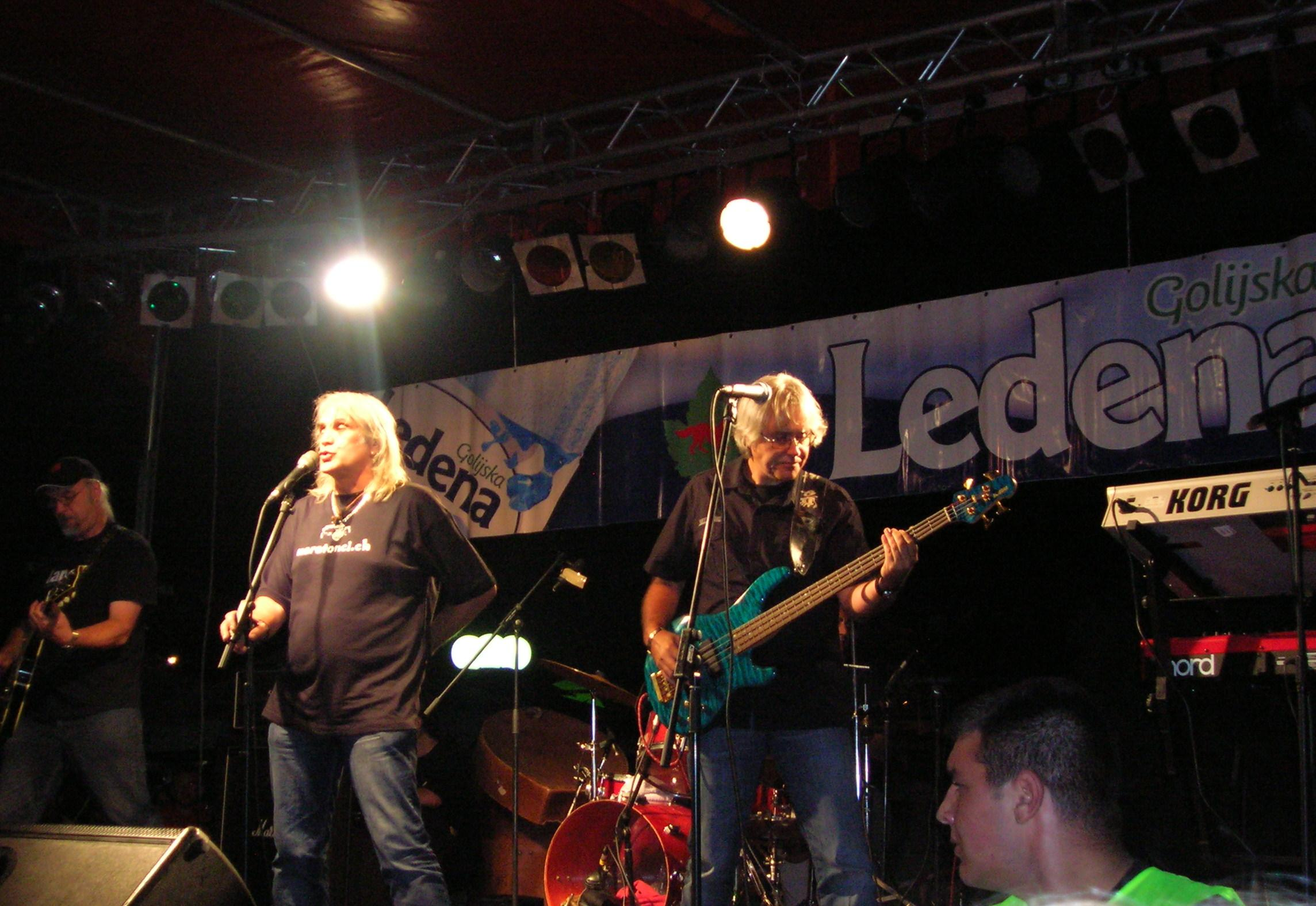
- Riblja Čorba performing live in Sokobanja in 2008
- Studio albums: 20
- Extended plays: 3
- Live albums: 12
- Compilation albums: 16
- Singles: 7
- Video albums: 9

The discography of Serbian and former Yugoslav rock band Riblja Čorba consists of 20 studio albums, 9 live albums, 6 Singles, 4 VHSes, 4 DVDs, 3 EPs, 13 compilation albums, and 1 box set. The list does not include solo material or side projects performed by the members.

The band considers EPs Trilogija 1: Nevinost bez zaštite, Trilogija 2: Devičanska ostrva and Trilogija 3: Ambasadori loše volje three parts of the studio album titled Trilogija, although all three were released separately. All songs from three EPs were released on the compilation album Trilogija.

== Studio albums ==
Title	Released	Format
Kost u grlu	1979	LP, AC, CD
Pokvarena mašta i prljave strasti	1981	LP, AC, CD
Mrtva priroda	1981	LP, AC, CD
Buvlja pijaca	1982	LP, AC, CD
Večeras vas zabavljaju muzičari koji piju	1984	LP, AC, CD
Istina	1985	LP, AC, CD
Osmi nervni slom	1986	LP, AC, CD
Ujed za dušu	1987	LP, AC, CD
Priča o ljubavi obično ugnjavi	1988	LP, AC, CD
Koza nostra	1990	LP, AC, CD
Labudova pesma	1992	LP, AC, CD
Zbogom, Srbijo	1993	CD, AC, LP
Ostalo je ćutanje	1996	CD, AC, LP
Nojeva barka	1999	CD, AC, LP
Pišanje uz vetar	2001	CD, AC
Ovde	2003	2CD, AC
Trilogija	2007	CD
Minut sa njom	2009	CD
Uzbuna!	2012	CD, LP
Da tebe nije	2019	CD, LP, USB

== Live albums ==
Title	Released	Recorded	Format
U ime naroda	1982	1982	LP, AC, CD
Nema laži, nema prevare – Uživo, Zagreb `85	1995	1985	CD, 2LP
Od Vardara pa do Triglava	1996	1988	2CD
Beograd, uživo '97 - 1	1997	1997	CD
Beograd, uživo '97 - 2	1997	1997	CD
Gladijatori u BG Areni	2007	2007	2CD, DVD
Niko nema ovakve ljude!	2010	2009	2CD, DVD
Koncert za brigadire	2012	1985	CD, LP
Čorba se čuje i bez struje	2015	2014	File
Live OFK Karaburma	2017	2002	File
Beograd 1981	2021	1981	LP, CD
Live Belgrade Beer Fest 2025	2025	2025	File

== Extended plays ==
Title	Released
Trilogija 1: Nevinost bez zaštite	2005
Trilogija 2: Devičanska ostrva	2006
Trilogija 3: Ambasadori loše volje	2006

== Compilation albums ==
Title	Released	Format
Riblja Čorba 10	1988	LP
The Best Of Fish Dish	1989	CD
Dobra stara vremena	1996	CD, AC
Najbolje	1996	CD, AC
Bolje od najboljeg	1996	CD
Treći srpski ustanak	1997	CD
To je bilo neko lepše i srećnije vreme Vol. 1	2000	CD, AC
To je bilo neko lepše i srećnije vreme Vol. 2	2000	CD, AC
To je bilo neko lepše i srećnije vreme - Balade	2000	CD, AC
Balade	2000	CD
Ljuti Rokenrol (Best Of 2)	2000	CD, AC
1994 - 2004	2004	CD, AC
19 najvećih hitova	2005	CD
Hitovi	2007	2CD
Najveci hitovi uzivo	2007	CD
Najbolje i bolje od najboljeg	2009	2CD
30 godina - The Best of	2009	CD
Box Set (1978 - 1990)	2011	12CD
Singlovi i rariteti	2011	CD
The Best Of Collection	2020	CD. File
The Platinum Collection - 6 Albuma	2020	6CD
Best Of	2020	File
Balade	2021	File
The Best Of - Zivimo Rokenrol	2022	File
Najveci hitovi	2024	File
Balade	2024	File

== Singles ==
Title	Released
"Lutka sa naslovne strane" / "On i njegov BMW"	1978
Rock 'n' Roll za kućni savet / "Valentino iz restorana	1979
"Nazad u prljavi veliki grad" / "Mirno spavaj" (uncensored version)	1980
"Kad hodaš" / "Priča o Žiki Živcu"	1984
"Nesrećnice, nije te sramota" / "Zašto kuče arlauče"	1987
"Zadnji voz za Čačak" / "Lud sto posto"	1987
"Uzbuna" / "Užasno mi nedostaje"	2012

== Video albums ==
Title	Released
Zvezde koje ne tamne - Buvlja pijaca	1987
Riblja Čorba Live	1994
The Best Of	1996
Spotovi	2002
Sabrana nedela 1	2002
Sabrana nedela 3	2002
Gladijatori u BG Areni	2008
Niko nema ovakve ljude!	2010

== Books ==
- Rok pesmarica - Riblja Čorba (1983)
- Dvadeset godina Riblje Čorbe (2000)
- YU rock legende 1. - Riblja čorba, Mirko Jakovljević (2002)
- Pogledaj dom svoj anđele, Nenad Stevović (2005)
- Čorbografija, Miroslav Milatović (2005)
