= Tivoli Hall =

Sports complex in Ljubljana, Slovenia

- Panoramic view of the ice hockey arena in 2021
- Interactive map of Tivoli Hall
- Location: Ljubljana, Slovenia
- Coordinates: 46.0602916°N 14.4952792°E
- Owner: City Municipality of Ljubljana
- Operator: Javni zavod Šport Ljubljana
- Capacity: 6,800 (big hall); 4,500 (small hall)
- Surface: Ice (big hall); Parquet (small hall)

Construction
- Groundbreaking: November 1963
- Built: 1963–1965
- Opened: April 1965
- Renovated: 1995 (small hall); 2000 and 2020 (big hall)
- Architects: Marjan Božič; Stanko Bloudek

Tivoli Hall (Slovene: Hala Tivoli) is a complex of two multi-purpose indoor sports arenas in the Tivoli City Park in Ljubljana, Slovenia. The complex was opened in 1965. The larger, ice hockey arena has a seating capacity of 6,800 people and is the home of HK Olimpija ice hockey club. During the EuroBasket 2013, the capacity was adjusted to 5,600.

The smaller basketball hall has a capacity for 4,500 spectators and is the secondary home venue of the basketball team KK Cedevita Olimpija.

== Events ==
Regular sporting events include:

- HK Olimpija (ice hockey)
- KK Cedevita Olimpija (basketball); secondary home venue after Arena Stožice
- Ilirija (basketball); since the 2017–18 season
- RK Olimpija (handball)
- ACH Volley (volleyball)

One-time sporting events include:

- 1965 World Table Tennis Championships
- 1970 FIBA World Championship, the final round
- 1970 World Figure Skating Championships
- 1970 World Artistic Gymnastics Championships
- 1982 World Weightlifting Championships
- 2004 European Men's Handball Championship
- Ice Hockey World Championships:
  - 1966 Ice Hockey World Championships – Group A
  - 1969 Ice Hockey World Championships – Group B
  - 1974 Ice Hockey World Championships – Group B
  - 1991 Men's Ice Hockey World Championships – Group B
  - 1993 Men's Ice Hockey World Championships – Group C
  - 1998 Men's Ice Hockey World Championships – Group B
  - 2001 Men's Ice Hockey World Championships – Division I
  - 2007 Men's Ice Hockey World Championships – Division I
  - 2010 Men's Ice Hockey World Championships – Division I
  - 2022 Men's Ice Hockey World Championships – Division I
- EuroBasket 2013, Group A
- UEFA Futsal Euro 2026

== Other activities ==
Apart from being a sporting venue, Tivoli Hall also hosts numerous concerts, musicals and other shows.

=== Concerts ===
- Louis Armstrong & The All Stars – April 4, 1965
- Blood, Sweat & Tears – June 1970
- Christie – October 1, 1971
- BOOM Festival 1972 – April 21–22, 1972
- Ray Charles – September 27, 1972
- BOOM Festival 1973 – April 20–21, 1973
- BOOM Festival 1974 – May 10–11, 1974
- Ike & Tina Turner – November 1974
- Jethro Tull – April 15, 1975
- Frank Zappa – November 22, 1975
- Procol Harum – January 30, 1976
- Suzi Quatro – February 27, 1976
- Bijelo Dugme – March 19, 1976 (Šta bi dao da si na mom mjestu Tour)
- Cat Stevens – May 14, 1976
- Queen – February 7, 1979
- José Feliciano – May 18, 1979
- Bijelo Dugme – October 12, 1979 (Bitanga i princeza Tour)
- Gillan – December 7, 1979
- Lene Lovich – April 4, 1980
- Bijelo Dugme – March 25, 1981 (Doživjeti stotu Tour)
- Azra – January 15, 1982
- Riblja Čorba – February 24, 1982 (Mrtva priroda Tour)
- Uriah Heep – May 16, 1983 (Head First Tour)
- Riblja Čorba – May 21, 1984 (Večeras vas zabavljaju muzičari koji piju Tour)
- Iron Maiden – August 19, 1984 (World Slavery Tour, opening act: Warriors)
- Dire Straits – May 13, 1985
- Plavi Orkestar – November 11, 1985
- Yoko Ono – March 18, 1986
- Riblja Čorba – April 23, 1986 (Osmi nervni slom Tour)
- Iron Maiden – September 12, 1986 (Somewhere on Tour, opening act: Waysted)
- Bajaga i Instruktori – November 17, 1986
- Bijelo Dugme – April 1, 1987 (Pljuni i zapjevaj moja Jugoslavijo Tour)
- Laibach – December 3, 1987
- Pankrti – December 10, 1987
- The Pixies – September 24, 1988
- Laibach – March 30, 1989
- Motörhead – April 27–28, 1989
- The Cure – May 24, 1989 (opening act: Shelleyan Orphan)
- Black Sabbath – September 27, 1989 (opening act: Axxis)
- The Dubliners – December 9, 1990
- The Sisters of Mercy – March 11, 1991
- Siouxsie and the Banshees – October 9, 1991
- Parni Valjak & Plavi Orkestar & Martin Krpan – December 21, 1991
- Zoran Predin – December 22, 1992
- Faith No More – June 16, 1993
- Bajaga i Instruktori – February 21, 1994
- Nirvana – February 27, 1994 (opening act: Melvins)
- The Ramones – October 10, 1994
- Đorđe Balašević – November 14, 1994
- Beastie Boys – February 26, 1995 (opening act: Luscious Jackson)
- Simple Minds – October 19, 1995
- Iron Maiden – January 21, 1996
- David Bowie – February 6, 1996
- Green Day – March 23, 1996
- The Sex Pistols – July 9, 1996
- ZZ Top – March 12, 1997
- The Prodigy – October 31, 1997
- Faith No More – November 19, 1997
- Đorđe Balašević – December 1, 1997
- NOFX – October 6, 1998
- Đorđe Balašević – December 8, 1998
- Bob Dylan – April 28, 1999
- Blondie – October 23, 1999 (opening act: The Flirt)
- Joe Cocker – November 7, 1999
- Plavi Orkestar – December 3, 1999
- Rage Against the Machine – February 8, 2000 (opening act: Asian Dub Foundation)
- Yes – March 20, 2000
- Steve Vai and Eric Sardinas – April 13, 2000
- Jethro Tull – May 11, 2000
- Sting – May 14, 2000
- Pearl Jam – June 19, 2000 (opening act: The Dismemberment Plan)
- HIM – November 12, 2000
- The Offspring – January 28, 2001 (opening act: AFI)
- Melanie C – February 14, 2001
- Michael Flatley's Lord of the Dance – April 24–26, 2001
- Nick Cave & The Bad Seeds – June 3, 2001
- Eros Ramazzotti – June 17, 2001
- Riblja Čorba – March 25, 2002 (Pišanje uz vetar Tour)
- Rammstein – June 10, 2002
- Goran Bregović & The Weddings and Funerals Orchestra – October 27, 2002
- Kosheen – February 22, 2003
- Bryan Adams – April 22, 2003
- Simply Red – July 9, 2003 (opening act: Sinéad O'Connor)
- Deep Purple – December 5, 2003
- Oliver Dragojević – February 22, 2004
- Riblja Čorba – May 6, 2004 (Ovde Tour)
- G3 – July 9, 2004
- R.E.M. – January 17, 2005 (opening act: Brainstorm)
- Anastacia – February 19, 2005
- Rammstein – February 25, 2005 (opening act: Apocalyptica)
- Lou Reed – March 13, 2005
- Mark Knopfler – May 3, 2005
- Ceca – May 20, 2005
- Joe Cocker – May 22, 2005
- Dream Theater – October 19, 2005
- Parni Valjak – December 14, 2005
- Lou Reed – March 13, 2006
- Simple Minds – April 8, 2006
- Deep Purple – October 5, 2006
- Bryan Adams – November 26, 2006
- Joan Baez – March 30, 2007
- Zucchero – May 12, 2007
- Il Divo – June 15, 2007
- Tori Amos – June 26, 2007 (opening act: Joshua Radin)
- P!nk – July 4–5, 2007
- Bryan Ferry – October 10, 2007
- Pankrti – December 1, 2007
- Nightwish – March 4, 2008 (opening act: PAIN)
- Tribute to Bijelo Dugme – April 5, 2008
- Katie Melua – April 27, 2008
- John Fogerty – June 14, 2008
- Status Quo – July 2, 2008
- Seal – July 14, 2008
- RBD – September 4–5, 2008
- Iggy Pop & The Stooges – September 29, 2008 (opening act: Psihomodo Pop)
- Jean Michel Jarre – November 7, 2008
- Uriah Heep – December 13, 2008
- RBD – December 16, 2008
- Lepa Brena – March 21, 2009
- Il Divo – March 27, 2009
- Simply Red – June 24, 2009
- ZZ Top – October 16, 2009
- Armin van Buuren and Rank 1 – October 23, 2009
- Dream Theater – October 31, 2009 (opening acts: Opeth, Bigelf, and Unexpect)
- Eros Ramazzotti – November 19, 2009
- Air – December 14, 2009 (opening act: We Fell to Earth)
- Michael Bolton – January 25, 2010
- Chris Rea – February 22, 2010
- Plavi Orkestar – February 26–27, 2010
- 50 Cent – March 3, 2010
- Anahí – March 12, 2010
- Parni Valjak – March 28, 2010
- Bob Dylan – June 13, 2010
- Billy Idol – June 24, 2010
- Boy George – September 23, 2010
- Manu Chao – April 2, 2011
- Whitesnake – November 30, 2011
- Tony Cetinski – December 21, 2011
- Smokie – February 2, 2012
- Keane – October 29, 2012
- Brit Floyd – Tribute to Pink Floyd – November 9, 2012
- Srebrna krila – November 30, 2012
- Motörhead – December 10, 2012
- Bajaga i Instruktori – December 20, 2012
- Slash – February 8, 2013
- Nelly Furtado – March 14, 2013
- Nick Cave & the Bad Seeds – November 25, 2013
- Dream Theater – February 4, 2014
- Sticky Fingers – Tribute to Rolling Stones – February 14, 2014
- Tadej Toš – Stand Up for Slovenija – March 26, 2015
- Toto – July 2, 2015
- Morrissey – October 10, 2015
- Whitesnake & Alice Cooper – June 12, 2016
- Željko Bebek – September 21, 2018
- Bajaga i Instruktori – November 29, 2018 (opening act: Vatra)
- The Dire Straits Experience – February 8, 2019
- Marija Šerifović – October 18, 2019
- Slade – November 30, 2019
- Smokie – April 16, 2022
- Pankrti – October 21, 2022 (opening act: Električni Orgazam)
- Jethro Tull – June 3, 2023

== See also ==
- List of indoor arenas in Slovenia

| Preceded by Cilindro Municipal (Uruguay) Montevideo | FIBA World Championship; Final Venue; 1970 | Succeeded by Roberto Clemente Coliseum (Puerto Rico) San Juan |
| Preceded by Ericsson Globe (Sweden) Stockholm | European Men's Handball Championship; Final Venue; 2004 | Succeeded by Hallenstadion (Switzerland) Zürich |
