= Nikola Zorić =

Serbian musician (born 1981)

- Also known as: Nidža
- Born: 5 March 1981 (age 45); Pančevo, SR Serbia, SFR Yugoslavia
- Genres: Hard rock; children's music
- Occupations: Musician, Songwriter
- Instruments: Keyboards, Vocals
- Years active: 1997 – present
- Labels: Hi-Fi Centar, M Factory, One Records

Nikola "Nidža" Zorić (Serbian Cyrillic: Никола "Ниџа" Зорић) is a Serbian musician best known as the keyboardist for the Serbian and former Yugoslav rock band Riblja Čorba.

== Biography ==
Nikola Zorić started his career in 1997 with band Kazneni Prostor. Alongside working with the band Zorić became a member of choir Braća Baruh. Kazneni Prostor disbanded in 1999, and Zorić joined Riblja Čorba in 2002 replacing Vlada Barjaktarević.

Nikola Zorić was involved in recording a Children's music choir Horislavci album Ekološka žurka and Tiho noći.

== Discography ==
=== With Riblja Čorba ===
==== Studio albums ====
- Ovde (2003)
- Trilogija (2006)
- Minut sa njom (2009)
- Uzbuna (2012)

=== Live albums ===
- Gladijatori u BG Areni (2007)
- Niko nema ovakve ljude! (2010)

==== EPs ====
- Trilogija 1: Nevinost bez zaštite (2005)
- Trilogija 2: Devičanska ostrva (2006)
- Trilogija 3: Ambasadori loše volje (2006)

=== Various artists albums ===
- Tiho noći (2007)
- Horislavci - Ekološka žurka (2007)
