= Miša Aleksić =

Serbian musician (1953–2020)

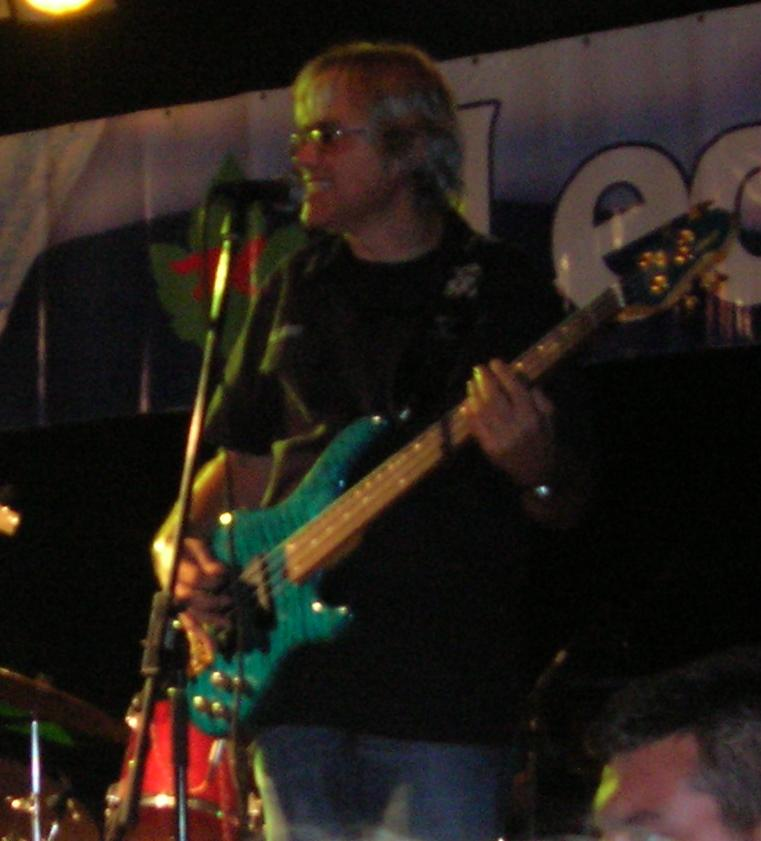
- Aleksić performing in 2008

Background information
- Born: August 16, 1953; Belgrade, PR Serbia, FPR Yugoslavia
- Died: November 29, 2020 (aged 67) Belgrade, Serbia
- Genres: Rockabilly; hard rock; heavy metal
- Occupations: Musician, songwriter
- Instruments: Bass guitar, vocals
- Years active: 1970–2020
- Labels: PGP RTB, Jugoton, Samy, WIT, Hi-Fi Centar, M Factory
- Formerly of: SOS; Riblja Čorba

Miroslav "Miša" Aleksić (Serbian Cyrillic: Мирослав Миша Алексић, 16 August 1953 — 29 November 2020) was a Serbian musician, best known as the bass guitarist for the Serbian and former Yugoslav rock band Riblja Čorba.

== Biography ==
Miša Aleksić started his career in 1970 in a band called Royali as their bass guitarist and vocalist. In 1970 the band won second place at the contest organized by editors of Radio Belgrade show Veče uz radio.

In 1971, Aleksić went to the United States where he graduated at Pikesville High School in Pikesville, Maryland. With other students he formed rockabilly band Shih-Muh-Fuh (abbreviation from Shit Motherfucker).

Influenced by the music of Grand Funk Railroad, Deep Purple and Led Zeppelin, after returning to Yugoslavia, Aleksić formed SOS with Dragan Štulović (guitar), Dragan Tasić (guitar) and Stevan Stevanović (drums). After Tasić left the band SOS continued performing as a trio. In 1977 Štulović and Stevanović left the band and were replaced by Rajko Kojić and Vicko Milatović. In 1978 Aleksić, Kojić and Milatović formed Riblja Čorba with a former Rani Mraz member Bora Đorđević.

During his career Aleksić wrote songs for Zdravko Čolić, Biljana Petrović, Jazzy Bell, Milorad Mandić and Run Go. He was also an album producer, and has produced, alongside part of Riblja Čorba albums, Warriors, Jazzy Bell, Minđušari, Bora Đorđević, Run Go and Prozor albums.

On 29 November 2020, Aleksić died following complications from COVID-19. He performed his last concert with Riblja Čorba on 29 February 2020, at Klubar Kranj in Slovenia.

== Discography ==
=== SOS ===
==== Singles ====
- "Nestvaran san" / "Stari sat" (1973)
- "Tražim" / "Magnovenje" (1974)
- "Čovek i pčela" / "Znam kako je" (1975)

=== Riblja Čorba ===
==== Studio albums ====
- Kost u grlu (1979)
- Pokvarena mašta i prljave strasti (1981)
- Mrtva priroda (1981)
- Buvlja pijaca (1982)
- Večeras vas zabavljaju muzičari koji piju (1984)
- Istina (1985)
- Osmi nervni slom (1986)
- Ujed za dušu (1987)
- Priča o ljubavi obično ugnjavi (1988)
- Koza nostra (1990)
- Labudova pesma (1992)
- Zbogom, Srbijo (1993)
- Ostalo je ćutanje (1996)
- Nojeva barka (1999)
- Pišanje uz vetar (2001)
- Ovde (2003)
- Minut sa njom (2009)
- Uzbuna (2012)
- Da tebe nije (2019)

=== Live albums ===
- U ime naroda (1982)
- Nema laži, nema prevare - Zagreb uživo `85 (1995)
- Od Vardara pa do Triglava (1996)
- Beograd, uživo '97 - 1 (1997)
- Beograd, uživo '97 - 2 (1997)
- Gladijatori u BG Areni (2007)
- Niko nema ovakve ljude! (2010)
- Koncert za brigadire (2012)

==== EPs ====
- Trilogija 1: Nevinost bez zaštite (2005)
- Trilogija 2: Devičanska ostrva (2006)
- Trilogija 3: Ambasadori loše volje (2006)

== Sources ==
- EX YU ROCK enciklopedija 1960-2006, Janjatović Petar; ISBN 978-86-905317-1-4
- Riblja čorba, Jakovljević Mirko; ISBN 86-83525-39-2
