= Zbogom, Srbijo =

Studio album by Riblja Čorba
- Released: December 20, 1993
- Recorded: January–April and September–December 1993
- Studios: Studio Pink, Zemun, Belgrade
- Genre: Hard rock
- Length: 39:01
- Label: Western International Trade Ltd.
- Producer: Riblja Čorba

Riblja Čorba chronology
Labudova pesma (1992)	Zbogom, Srbijo (1993)	Nema laži, nema prevare – Uživo, Zagreb `85 (1995)

Professional ratings
Review scores
Source	Rating
Branimir Lokner – Kritičko pakovanje	(favorable)

Zbogom, Srbijo (Serbian Cyrillic: Збогом, Србијо, trans. Farewell, Serbia) is the twelfth studio album from Serbian and former Yugoslav rock band Riblja Čorba, released in 1993.

Zbogom, Srbijo is the last album recorded with guitarist Zoran Ilić. Although Vlada Barjaktarević played the keyboards (and co-produced the album) he would become the official member of the band after the release of the band's following studio album, Ostalo je ćutanje. The song "Kamenko i Kremenko" featured Kristijan Golubović on vocals.

The album's biggest hits were the ballad "Jedino moje" and the anti-war song "Zbogom, Srbijo". The album also featured "Zelena trava doma mog" (a cover of "Green Green Grass of Home"), "Danas nema mleka" (a heavy metal cover of Herman's Hermits' "No Milk Today"), which criticizes the Socialist Party of Serbia regime, and "Tamna je noć" (a cover of Mark Bernes' "Tyomnaya noch").

== Album cover ==
The album cover, designed by Jugoslav Vlahović, is a parody of the double-headed eagle which appears on the coat of arms of Serbia, but there is also a connection with the cover of Riblja Čorba's 1981 album Mrtva priroda.

== Track listing ==
No.	Title	Lyrics	Music	Length
1.	"Zelena trava doma mog" ("Green grass of my home")	B. Đorđević	C. Putman	3:50
2.	"Tamna je noć" ("Dark is the night")	B. Đorđević	N. Bogoslovsky	3:20
3.	"Tezga" ("The gig")	B. Đorđević	Z. Ilić	4:17
4.	"Jak, mlad i glup" ("Strong, young and stupid")	B. Đorđević	M. Aleksić	3:22
5.	"Jedino moje" ("My only one")	B. Đorđević	B. Đorđević	4:42
6.	"Danas nema mleka" ("No milk today")	B. Đorđević	G. Gouldman	3:39
7.	"Kopriva" ("Nettle")	B. Đorđević	V. Božinović	4:30
8.	"Rapsodija u plavom (Policijska akademija)" ("Rhapsody in blue (Police Academy)")	B. Đorđević	V. Milatović	3:07
9.	"Kamenko i Kremenko" ("Rubble and Flintstone")	B. Đorđević	M. Aleksić, B. Đorđević	3:41
10.	"Zbogom, Srbijo" ("Farewell, Serbia")	B. Đorđević	T. Kunda	4:35

== Personnel ==
- Bora Đorđević – vocals
- Vidoja Božinović – guitar
- Zoran Ilić – guitar
- Miša Aleksić – bass guitar
- Vicko Milatović – drums

=== Additional personnel ===
- Vlada Barjaktarević – keyboardsm co-producer
- Marija Mihajlović – backing vocals
- Aleksandar Radivojević – harmonica
- Kristijan Golubović – vocals (on "Kamenko i Kremenko")
