= U ritmu srca malog dobošara =

Studio album by Vicko Milatović
- Released: 1986
- Genre: Rock; Hard rock
- Length: 33:28
- Label: PGP RTB
- Producer: Kornelije Kovač

Vicko Milatović chronology
U ritmu srca malog dobošara (1986)	Dečaci o devojčicama (2003)

U ritmu srca malog dobošara (trans. In the Rhythm of the Little Drummer's Heart) is the first solo album released by Vicko Milatović.

The cover art was previously created by cartoonist Jugoslav Vlahović for Alisa's debut album Alisa, but was refused by the band members as "too morbid".

== Track listing ==
All the songs were written by Milatović with help from Miodrag Živadinović.

1. "Dođi mala, igraj tvist" – 3:09
2. "Gotovo je" – 3:04
3. "Pesma od 128 kila" – 2:50
4. "Indira" – 3:44
5. "Teška noć" – 4:24
6. "Štule Zombi" – 3:10
7. "Crnkinje" – 3:04
8. "Gluvarenje" – 4:12
9. "Zaboravi me" – 5:22

== Personnel ==
- Vicko Milatović - vocals
- Miodrag Živadinović - guitar
- Dragan Deletić - guitar
- Tomo Babović - keyboards
- Dragan Gajić - drums
- Zoran Radovanović - drums
