= Gladijatori u BG Areni =

Live album by Riblja Čorba
- Released: 2007
- Recorded: Belgrade Arena; March 10, 2007
- Genre: Hard rock
- Length: 143:17
- Label: City Records; M Factory

Riblja Čorba chronology
| Trilogija 3: Ambasadori loše volje (2006) | Gladijatori u BG Areni (2007) | Minut sa njom (2009) |

Gladijatori u BG Areni (trans. Gladiators in Belgrade Arena) is a double and the fifth live album by Serbian and former Yugoslav rock band Riblja Čorba. The album was recorded on Riblja Čorba concert held in Belgrade Arena, on March 10, 2007.

The opening track "Ostaću slobodan" features the sound of motorcycles that started the concert driving onto the stage. The track "Nojeva barka" features the band's leader Bora Đorđević reading his poem with pornographic lyrics "Zašto sve što je lepo ima kraj". The track "Vetar duva, duva, duva" features Đorđević introducing band members as convicts and fugitives indicted for war crimes: Nikola Zorić as Veselin Šljivančanin, Miša Aleksić as Biljana Plavšić, Vicko Milatović as Milorad Ulemek (an infamous and much criticized introduction), Vidoja Božinović as Ratko Mladić, and himself as Radovan Karadžić. Songs "Kada padne noć (Upomoć)", "Pogledaj dom svoj, anđele", "Ostani đubre do kraja" and "Prezir" feature the Academic Choir Obilić and Radio Television of Serbia Symphony Orchestra conducted by Vojkan Borisavljević (on "Kada padne noć (Upomoć)", "Pogledaj dom svoj, anđele" and "Ostani đubre do kraja") and by the band's keyboardist Nikola Zorić (on "Prezir").

The album cover features Bora Đorđević.

== Track listing ==
=== Disc 1 ===
1. "Ostaću slobodan" – 4:05
2. "Zvezda potkrovlja i suterena" – 2:47
3. "Nojeva barka" – 7:40
4. "Srbin je lud" – 3:53
5. "Jedini način" – 3:21
6. "Sve i svja" – 5:21
7. "Neću da ispadnem životinja" – 4:27
8. "Jedino moje" – 5:13
9. "Poslednja pesma o tebi" – 4:14
10. "Bilo je žena" – 5:27
11. "Sponzori" – 3:40
12. "Gastarbajterska pesma" – 4:20
13. "Zelena trava doma mog" – 4:21
14. "Vetar duva, duva, duva" – 5:23
15. "Dva dinara, druže" – 3:29
16. "Nemoj srećo, nemoj danas" – 4:41

=== Disc 2 ===
1. "Južna Afrika '85 (Ja ću da pevam)" – 4:20
2. "Gde si u ovom glupom hotelu" – 5:12
3. "Odlazak u grad" – 2:48
4. "Avionu slomiću ti krila" – 4:41
5. "Amsterdam" - 6:43
6. "Kad sam bio mlad" – 3:36
7. "Ljubav ovde više ne stanuje" – 4:50
8. "Dobro jutro" – 6:12
9. "Kada padne noć (Upomoć)" – 8:07
10. "Pogledaj dom svoj, anđele" – 6:59
11. "Ostani đubre do kraja" - 4:57
12. "Lutka sa naslovne strane" – 4:07
13. "Prezir" – 5:53

== Personnel ==
- Bora Đorđević - vocals
- Vidoja Božinović - guitar
- Nikola Zorić - keyboard. conductor
- Miša Aleksić - bass guitar
- Miroslav Milatović - drums

=== Additional personnel ===
- Vojkan Borisavljević - conductor
- Academic Choir Obilić
- Radio Television of Serbia Symphony Orchestra
- Oliver Jovanović - engineer
- Sreten Milojević - recorded by
