= Jugoslav Vlahović =

Serbian-Yugoslavian artist, musician, educator, and photographer

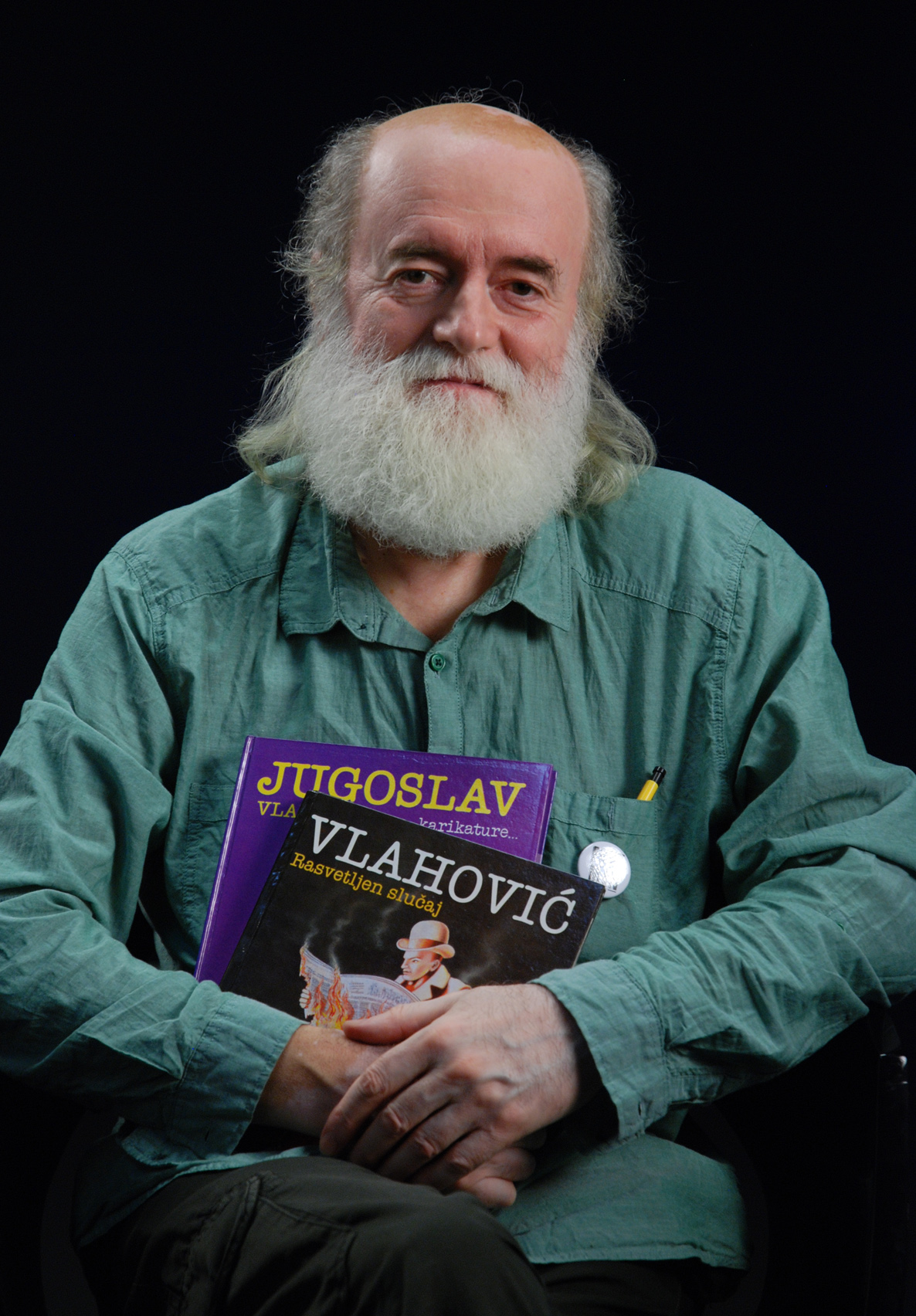
- Jugoslav Vlahović in 2012
- Born: Jugoslav Vlahović; 17 March 1949 (age 77) Belgrade, PR Serbia, FPR Yugoslavia
- Areas: Visual artist, caricaturist, illustrator, graphic designer, photographer, art educator, musician

Jugoslav Vlahović (Serbian Cyrillic: Југослав Влаховић; born 17 March 1949) is a Serbian and Yugoslav visual artist, caricaturist, illustrator, graphic designer, photographer, art educator and retired rock musician. Vlahović is best known for his caricatures published in various publications, his work as an album cover designer—of his album cover designs the best known are the ones for the band Riblja Čorba—and as a former member of the rock band Porodična Manufaktura Crnog Hleba. Since 1997, he has been a professor at the Belgrade Faculty of Applied Arts, where he currently teaches book graphics.

== Biography ==
=== Early biography ===
Vlahović was born in Belgrade in 1949. He graduated at the Second Belgrade Highschool and later at the Belgrade Academy of Applied Arts.

=== Musical career ===
In 1968, Vlahović formed the acoustic rock band Porodična Manufaktura Crnog Hleba with his relatives Maja de Rado (vocals) and Slobodan Kuzmanović (guitar), the three later joined by double bass player Petar Pavišić. The group gained popularity with artistic songs written by their teenage frontess. Beside appearing on a large number of rock festivals, the band acted as a theatre troupe, holding happenings in Atelje 212 theatre in Belgrade. In 1974, the band released their only studio album, Stvaranje (The Creation), disbanding after the album release, when all three male members of the band went to serve their mandatory stints in the Yugoslav army.

From 1968 to 1974, Vlahović acted in Atelje 212's production of Hair. He was also a member of the alternative performance troupe Ekipa za Akciju i Anonimnu Atrakciju (Crew for Action and Anonymous Attraction), also known as Ekipa A3.

=== Art career ===
In 1976, Vlahović started working as an illustrator and caricaturist for NIN magazine and retired from music. Over 6000 of his works have been published in NIN. His works have also been published in a number of magazines in Yugoslavia and abroad. He illustrated a number of books. He held over 80 solo exhibitions. He has received a number of awards for his work, including the Pjer award, The Applied Artists and Designers Association of Serbia Annual Award, Crayon de Porcelaine award, and others.

Vlahović has published one portfolio of graphic prints and 15 books of his works—14 books of his caricatures and one book of comics.

==== Album cover design ====
As an album cover designer, Vlahović is best known for his cooperation with the Serbian and Yugoslav rock band Riblja Čorba. Vlahović designed the band logo, and has designed most of the band's album covers up to present date. Vlahović also designed covers for Alisa, Bezobrazno Zeleno, Bulevar, Generacija 5, Kornelije Kovač, Srđan Marjanović, Slađana Milošević, Pop Mašina, Rok Mašina, Smak, Suncokret, S Vremena Na Vreme, Tunel, Vatreni Poljubac, solo albums by the members of Riblja Čorba, and other acts.

=== Art education ===
Vlahović has been a professor at the Belgrade Faculty of Applied Arts since 1997. Currently, he teaches book graphics at the faculty.

=== Family ===
He is the father of Jakša Vlahović, a graphic designer and former member of the gothic metal band Abonos and thrash metal band Bombarder, and Marta Vlahović, a former Abonos member.

== Discography ==
=== With Porodična Manufaktura Crnog Hleba ===
==== Studio albums ====
- Stvaranje (1974)

==== Singles ====
- "Mudra Mande" / "Pitaš me" (1973)
- "Nešto" / "Čovjek i pas" (1973)
- "Imam li što od tog" / "Nisam smio" (1974)

== Bibliography ==
=== Books of caricatures ===
- Veni, vidi, vic (1974)
- Rasvetljen slučaj (1986)
- Jugoslav (1991)
- Art geleri (2001)
- Velika mala knjiga (2005)
- Čekajući godove (2006)
- Mondiseja 2001 – 2009 (2010)
- Crna (2011)
- Katze blackie (2013)
- Knjiga otisaka (2014)
- Flower Power (2018)
- Sto za vino (2019)
- Ludus in fabula (2019)
- Laki (2021)

=== Books of comics ===
- Denkzettel (1999)

== Design ==
=== Selected album covers design ===
- Alisa – Alisa (1985)
- Alisa – Da li si čula pesmu umornih slavuja? (1987)
- Bezobrazno Zeleno – 1 (1983)
- Bulevar – Loš i mlad (1981)
- Bulevar – Mala noćna panika (1982)
- Generacija 5 – Dubler (1982)
- Rajko Kojić – Ne budi me bez razloga (1983)
- Kornelije Kovač – Iz drugog filma (1982)
- Srđan Marjanović – Ne kači se za mene (1981)
- Vicko Milatović – U ritmu srca malog dobošara (1986)
- Slađana Milošević – Gorim od želje da ubijem noć (1979)
- Pop Mašina – Kiselina (1973)
- Pop Mašina – Na izvoru svetlosti (1975)
- Pop Mašina – Put ka Suncu (1976)
- Riblja Čorba – Kost u grlu (1979)
- Riblja Čorba – Pokvarena mašta i prljave strasti (1981)
- Riblja Čorba – Mrtva priroda (1981)
- Riblja Čorba – Buvlja pijaca (1982)
- Riblja Čorba – Večeras vas zabavljaju muzičari koji piju (1984)
- Riblja Čorba – Istina (1985)
- Riblja Čorba – Ujed za dušu (1987)
- Riblja Čorba – Priča o ljubavi obično ugnjavi (1988)
- Riblja Čorba – Labudova pesma (1992)
- Riblja Čorba – Zbogom, Srbijo (1993)
- Riblja Čorba – Ostalo je ćutanje (1996)
- Riblja Čorba – Nojeva barka (1999)
- Riblja Čorba – Pišanje uz vetar (2001)
- Riblja Čorba – Ovde (2003)
- Riblja Čorba – Trilogija 1: Nevinost bez zaštite (2005)
- Riblja Čorba – Trilogija 2: Devičanska ostrva (2006)
- Riblja Čorba – Trilogija 3: Ambasadori loše volje (2006)
- Riblja Čorba – Minut sa njom (2009)
- Riblja Čorba – Uzbuna! (2012)
- Rok Mašina – Rok Mašina (1981)
- Rok Mašina – Izrod na granici (1983)
- Smak – Rok cirkus (1980)
- Suncokret – Moje bube (1977)
- S Vremena Na Vreme – Paviljon G (1979)
- Tunel – Niz tri tamne ulice (1983)
- Vatreni Poljubac – To je ono pravo (1980)
- Vatreni Poljubac – Bez dlake na jeziku (1980)
