= Nojeva barka =

Studio album by Riblja Čorba
- Released: November 16, 1999
- Recorded: September – October 1999; O Studio, Belgrade/Ego Studio, Belgrade
- Genre: Hard rock
- Length: 46:29
- Label: Hi-Fi Centar
- Producer: Milan Popović; Miša Aleksić

Riblja Čorba chronology
Beograd, uživo '97 – 2 (1997)	Nojeva barka (1999)	Pišanje uz vetar (2001)

Nojeva barka (trans. "Noah's Ark") is the fourteenth studio album from Serbian and former Yugoslav rock band Riblja Čorba, released in 1999.

The album's biggest hits were its title track, "Gastarbajterska 2", "Care" (which criticizes Slobodan Milošević and Socialist Party of Serbia), and the ballad "Princ". The song "16 noći" is a Serbian language cover of Merle Travis' song "Sixteen Tons", Riblja Čorba version dealing with phone sex. The music for the song "Gde si" was written by a former Riblja Čorba member and Bajaga i Instruktori frontman Momčilo Bajagić, who also sang backing vocals on the song.

== Album cover ==
The album cover was designed by Jugoslav Vlahović.

== Track listing ==
No.	Title	Lyrics	Music	Length
1.	"16 noći (16 Nights)"	B. Đorđević	M. Travis	3:15
2.	"Posle dobrog ručka (After a Good Lunch)"	B. Đorđević	M. Aleksić, B. Đorđević	4:23
3.	"Pevač (Singer)"	B. Đorđević	M. Aleksić	3:09
4.	"Nojeva barka (Noah's Ark)"	B. Đorđević	M. Milatović	4:52
5.	"Izgubljen slučaj (Lost Cause)"	B. Đorđević	B. Đorđević	5:06
6.	"Gde si (Where Are You)"	B. Đorđević	M. Bajagić	4:00
7.	"Gastarbajterska 2 (Workers Song 2)"	B. Đorđević	B. Đorđević	4:03
8.	"Care (Emperor)"	B. Đorđević	B. Đorđević	4:11
9.	"Leksilium pesma (Lexilium Song)"	B. Đorđević	M. Milatović	4:44
10.	"Vreme ti isteklo (Your Time is up)"	B. Đorđević	B. Đorđević	4:30
11.	"Princ (Prince)"	B. Đorđević	V. Božinović	4:33

== Personnel ==
- Bora Đorđević - vocals
- Vidoja Božinović - guitar
- Miša Aleksić - bass guitar, producer
- Vicko Milatović - drums
- Vladimir Barjaktarević - keyboards

=== Additional personnel ===
- Željko Savić - acoustic guitar, backing vocals
- Momčilo Bajagić - backing vocals
- Saša Đokić - bass guitar
- Branko Marušić - harmonica
- Mirko Tomić - pedal steel guitar, resonator guitar
- Srđan Đaković - trumpet
- Slavoljub Kolarević - saxophone
- Milan Popović - producer
- Dragutin Jakovljević - recorded by
- Oliver Jovanović - mastered by
