= Koza nostra =

Studio album by Riblja Čorba
- Released: 8 May 1990
- Recorded: 1989
- Studio: Studio V PGP-RTB, Belgrade
- Genre: Hard rock; blues rock
- Length: 37:58
- Label: PGP-RTB
- Producer: Saša Habić

Riblja Čorba chronology
Priča o ljubavi obično ugnjavi (1988)	Koza nostra (1990)	Labudova pesma (1992)

Professional ratings
Review scores
Source	Rating
Novi Ritam	1/5 stars

Koza nostra (transliteration for "Cosa Nostra", also a word play, with "koza" meaning goat in Serbian) is the tenth studio album from Serbian and former Yugoslav rock band Riblja Čorba, released in 1990.

Koza nostra is the first studio album recorded with guitarist Zoran Ilić, who came to Riblja Čorba as a replacement for Nikola Čuturilo. The song "Al Kapone" featured Branimir Štulić and Azra members on backing vocals. "Gde si u ovom glupom hotelu" featured former Suncokret (Riblja Čorba's frontman Bora Đorđević's former band) members Gorica Popović, Snežana Jandrlić and Biljana Krstić on backing vocals. Keyboards on the album were played by Bajaga i Instruktori member Saša Lokner.

The album hits included a cover of Chuck Berry's song "Memphis, Tennessee", Riblja Čorba version entitled "Crna Gora, Bar", the punk rock song "Deca", and "Tito je vaš" and "Al Kapone", which directly ridiculed late Yugoslav president Josip Broz Tito.

== Album cover ==
The album cover was designed by the band's guitarist Zoran Ilić, and is one of two Riblja Čorba album covers which were not designed by Jugoslav Vlahović (the other one being Osmi nervni slom cover).

== Track listing ==
No.	Title	Lyrics	Music	Length
1.	"Al Kapone" ("Al Capone")	B. Đorđević	B. Đorđević	3:52
2.	"Ja je gledam kako spava" ("I'm Watching Her Sleep")	B. Đorđević	Z. Ilić	4:23
3.	"Deca" ("Children")	B. Đorđević	B. Đorđević	3:13
4.	"Bejbi" ("Baby")	B. Đorđević	B. Đorđević	2:41
5.	"Hej, kako ti je sad" ("Hey, How Are You Now")	B. Đorđević	B. Đorđević	3:31
6.	"Tito je vaš" ("Tito Is Yours")	B. Đorđević	M. Milatović	4:50
7.	"Gde si u ovom glupom hotelu" ("Where Are You in This Stupid Hotel")	B. Đorđević	V. Božinović	5:04
8.	"Milivoje vatrogasac" ("Milivoje the Fireman")	B. Đorđević	M. Aleksić	3:42
9.	"Žikica Jovanović Španac" ("Žikica Jovanović Španac")	B. Đorđević	V. Božinović	3:37
10.	"Crna Gora, Bar" (Montenegro, Bar)	B. Đorđević	C. Berry	3:05

== Personnel ==
- Bora Đorđević - vocals
- Vidoja Božinović - guitar
- Zoran Ilić - guitar
- Vicko Milatović - drums
- Miša Aleksić - bass guitar

=== Guest musicians ===
- Saša Lokner - keyboard
- Branimir Štulić - backing vocals (on "Al Kapone")
- Azra members - backing vocals (on "Al Kapone")
- Gorica Popović - backing vocals (on "Bejbi" and "Gde si u ovom glupom hotelu")
- Snežana Jandrlić - backing vocals (on "Bejbi" and "Gde si u ovom glupom hotelu")
- Biljana Krstić - backing vocals (on "Bejbi" and "Gde si u ovom glupom hoteu")

=== Additional personnel ===
- Saša Habić - producer
- Vlada Negovanović - recorded by

== Covers ==
- Serbian progressive/power metal band Alogia released a cover of "Gde si u ovom glupom hotelu" on their 2004 album Priče o životu. Vicko Milatović and Vidoja Božinović made a guest appearance on Alogia's concert in Studentski kulturni centar in Belgrade performing "Gde si u ovom glupom hotelu" with the band. The recording of the concert, including "Gde si u ovom glupom hotelu", was released on AlogiA's 2006 live album Priče o vremenu i životu – Live at SKC.
