= Porodična Manufaktura Crnog Hleba =

Background information
- Origin: Belgrade, SR Serbia, SFR Yugoslavia
- Genres: Acoustic rock; progressive rock; art rock
- Years active: 1968–1975
- Labels: PGP-RTB
- Past members: Maja de Rado; Jugoslav Vlahović; Slobodan Kuzmanović; Petar Pavišić; Vlada Bogosavljević; Sreten Tasić; Branko Malkoč

Porodična Manufaktura Crnog Hleba (Serbian Cyrillic: Породична Мануфактура Црног Хлеба; trans. Rye Bread Family Manufacture) was a Yugoslav rock band and a theatrical troupe formed in Belgrade in 1968.

The band was formed by vocalist and guitarist Maja de Rado, guitarist Jugoslav Vlahović and guitarist Slobodan Kuzmanović, who were later joined by bass player Petar Pavišić. The band performed acoustic music and was one of the pioneers of the Yugoslav acoustic rock scene. They held happenings in Atelje 212 theatre in Belgrade, gaining the attention of the public with songs written by their teenage frontress. They released their only studio album in 1974, disbanding a year later. After the group ended their activity, Vlahović would go on to become one of the most notable caricaturists and album cover designers in Yugoslavia.

== Band history ==
=== 1968–1975 ===
The band was formed in 1968 by Maja de Rado (vocals and twelve string guitar), Jugoslav Vlahović (prim, acoustic guitar) and Slobodan Kuzmanović (acoustic guitar). Being close relatives, they decided to name the band Porodična Manufaktura Crnog Hleba. At the beginning of 1969, they were joined by Petar Pavišić (double bass). On their live performances they were joined by a flutist; flutists Vlada Bogosavljević, Sreten Tasić and Branko Malkoč all performed with the band on different occasions. The band soon gained attention of the media owing to the lyrics and compositions of Maja de Rado, who was only fifteen years old at the time of the band's formation.

The band held happenings in the basement of Atelje 212 theatre. During 1972 and 1973 in Atelje 212 they performed the alternative play Porodična manufaktura crnog hleba – balada Maje de Rado (Rye Bread Family Manufacture – A Ballad by Maja de Rado), during which they performed their music. They had numerous appearances on rock concerts in Belgrade Sports Hall, and in 1972 they performed, alongside Pop Mašina, S Vremena Na Vreme and other bands, on the large open-air concert at Belgrade's Hajdučka česma. In 1973, the band, alongside Time and Josipa Lisac, represented Yugoslavia at the 10th World Festival of Youth and Students in East Berlin. During the same year, the band released their first record, a 7-inch single with the songs "Mudra Mande" ("Wise Mande") and "Pitaš me" ("You're Asking Me") through PGP-RTB record label. The song "Mudra Mande" was sung in a dialect spoken on the island of Brač. On this island they also prepared songs for their first album.

In 1974, they released their debut and only album, Stvaranje (The Creation). The album, besides new songs, featured the songs "Čovek i pas" ("Man and Dog"), "Imam li što od tog" ("What's in It for Me") and "Nisam smio" ("I Shouldn't Have"), previously released on 7-inch singles. All the songs were written by Maja de Rado, while Vlahović did the arrangements and produced the album. The album featured guest appearance by Sanja Ilić on organ, Milomir Stamenković on violin, Branimir Grujić (formerly of Smeli) on drums, and Borislav Pavićević on congas. The band intended to include the song "Nisam htjela nju" ("I Didn't Want Her")—arguably the first lesbian-themed song on the Yugoslav rock scene—on the album, but their record label PGP-RTB refused to release the song on the record. Following the release of Stvaranje, they started performing a play with the same name at Atelje 212, during which they played photographic slides and short films. On these performances they were joined by painter Dobrivoje Petrović on sitar.

In 1975, at the time of the recording of their second studio album, male members of the band all went to serve their mandatory stints in the Yugoslav army, Porodična Manufaktura Crnog Hleba thus ending their activity.

=== Post breakup ===
After the breakup of the band, Maja de Rado dedicated herself to classical music and meditation poetry and prose. She released an audio cassette with her oratorio Slava ocu (Glory to the Father). She died on 8 June 2019.

From 1968 to 1974, Vlahović acted in Atelje 212's production of Hair. He was also a member of the alternative performance troupe Ekipa za Akciju i Anonimnu Atrakciju (Crew for Action and Anonymous Attraction), also known as Ekipa A3. In 1976, he became a caricaturist and illustrator for the magazine NIN and retired from music. Since 1976, he has been working as a caricaturist, illustrator, and graphic designer. As a cover designer, he is best known for his cooperation with Riblja Čorba, but he also designed covers for the albums by Pop Mašina, S Vremena Na Vreme, Smak, Suncokret, Tako, Bulevar, Alisa and other Yugoslav acts. He is currently professor of book graphics at the Belgrade Faculty of Applied Arts. He has illustrated and designed a number of books, worked for numerous magazines, had over 80 solo exhibitions, published 15 books of his works and received a number of awards. With his children Jakša and Marta he occasionally performs under the name Porodična Manufaktura Integralnog Hleba (Multigrain Bread Family Manufacture).

Slobodan Kuzmanović died on 26 January 2014.

In 1994, the band's song "Nešto" ("Something") was released on Komuna compilation album Sve smo mogli mi: Akustičarska muzika (We Could Have Done All: Acoustic Music), which featured songs by Yugoslav acoustic rock acts.

In January 2025, it was announced that PGP-RTS and Croatia Records would jointly release a compilation featuring all the tracks from Stvaranje, the songs from the band's 7-inch singles and, as a bonus, a 1972 live recording of the song "Nisam htjela nju".

== Discography ==
=== Studio albums ===
- Stvaranje (1974)

=== Singles ===
- "Mudra Mande" / "Pitaš me" (1973)
- "Nešto" / "Čovjek i pas" (1973)
- "Imam li što od tog" / "Nisam smio" (1974)
