= Vidoja Božinović =

Serbian musician (born 1955)

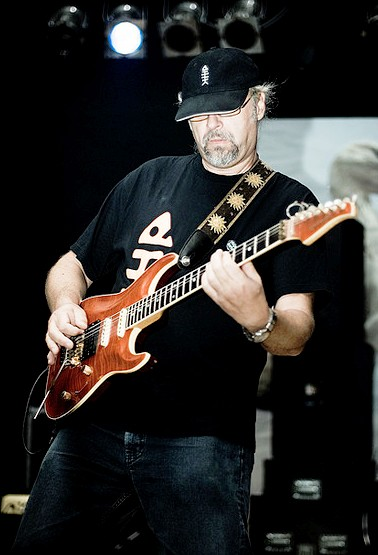
- Božinović performing in 2007

Background information
- Also known as: Džindžer
- Born: 3 October 1955 (age 70); Belgrade, SR Serbia, FPR Yugoslavia
- Genres: Progressive rock; hard rock
- Occupations: Musician, Songwriter
- Instrument: Guitar
- Years active: 1976–present
- Labels: PGP RTB, ZKP RTLJ, Jugodisk, Jugoton, Samy, WIT, Hi-Fi Centar, M Factory, City

Vidoja Božinović (Serbian Cyrillic: Видоја Божиновић, born 3 October 1955), also known as Džindžer (transliteration for Ginger), is a Serbian musician. He is best known as the guitarist for the Serbian and former Yugoslav rock band Riblja Čorba.

== Biography ==
Vidoja Božinović started his career in 1974 as the guitarist for the band Dim Bez Vatre. After the group disbanded Božinović joined the band Mirjan. In 1976, he joined progressive rock band Pop Mašina, whose member was already his brother Zoran Božinović. After Pop Mašina disbanded in 1978. Vidoja Božinović joined Dah. In 1979, he became a member of the last Opus lineup.

In 1980, former Pop Mašina members Robert Nemeček and Božinović brothers formed the hard rock band Rok Mašina. They released their self-titled debut album Rok Mašina in 1981, only to disband a year later. Songs they recorded in 1982 were released on the album Izrod na granici.

In 1984, Božinović performed with the jazz band Interaction, until he became a Riblja Čorba member in September. Božinović and Nikola Čuturilo became the band's new guitarists, replacing Rajko Kojić and Momčilo Bajagić. As a Riblja Čorba guitarist, Božinović performed with Nikola Čuturilo and Stjepan Mihaljnec on Bora Đorđević and Arsen Dedić unplugged concert in Terazije Theatre in 1987. He is still a member of Riblja Čorba today.

== Side projects and guest appearances ==
- In 1979 Božinović worked with Generacija 5 on the recording of their album Pesme o Titu ("Songs about Tito"), which was never released.
- He played guitar on Jazzy Bell's album Tao released in 1993.
- He played guitar on Milorad Mandić's album Životinje i ljudi.
- In 1996 he played guitar on Bora Đorđević's solo album Njihovi dani.
- At the beginning of 2004 Božinović, Đorđević and Vlada Barjaktarević recorded football song "Lavovi u Evropi" for the needs of FK Železnik.
- At the beginning of 2006 Božinović was involved in the recording of Jan Nemeček's ambient music album After Image.

== Discography ==
=== Pop Mašina ===
==== Singles ====
- "Moja pesma" / "Uspomena" (1977)

=== Rok Mašina ===
==== Studio albums ====
- Rok Mašina (1981)

==== EPs ====
- Izrod na granici (1983)

==== Singles ====
- "Vatra" / "Bilo mi je bolje" (1980)
- "Granica" / "Nulti čas" (2004)

=== Riblja Čorba ===
==== Studio albums ====
- Istina (1985)
- Osmi nervni slom (1986)
- Ujed za dušu (1987)
- Priča o ljubavi obično ugnjavi (1988)
- Koza nostra (1990)
- Labudova pesma (1992)
- Zbogom, Srbijo (1993)
- Ostalo je ćutanje (1996)
- Nojeva barka (1999)
- Pišanje uz vetar (2001)
- Ovde (2003)
- Minut sa njom (2009)
- Uzbuna (2012)

=== Live albums ===
- Nema laži, nema prevare - Zagreb uživo `85 (1995)
- Od Vardara pa do Triglava (1996)
- Beograd, uživo '97 - 1 (1997)
- Beograd, uživo '97 - 2 (1997)
- Gladijatori u BG Areni (2007)
- Niko nema ovakve ljude! (2010)
- Koncert za brigadire (2012)

==== EPs ====
- Trilogija 1: Nevinost bez zaštite (2005)
- Trilogija 2: Devičanska ostrva (2006)
- Trilogija 3: Ambasadori loše volje (2006)
