= Trilogija 2: Devičanska ostrva =

EP by Riblja Čorba
- Released: March 21, 2006
- Recorded: Studio O, December 15, 2005 – February 15, 2006
- Genre: Hard rock
- Length: 19:09
- Label: M Factory
- Producer: Milan Popović; Miša Aleksić

Riblja Čorba chronology
Trilogija 1: Nevinost bez zaštite (2005)	Trilogija 2: Devičanska ostrva (2006)	Trilogija 3: Ambasadori loše volje (2006)

Trilogija 2: Devičanska ostrva (Serbian Cyrillic: Трилогија 2: Девичанска острва, trans. Trilogy 2: Virgin Islands) is the second EP from Serbian and former Yugoslav rock band Riblja Čorba. It is the second part of the Riblja Čorba trilogy released during 2005 and 2006. The band considers EPs Trilogija 1: Nevinost bez zaštite, Trilogija 2: Devičanska ostrva and Trilogija 3: Ambasadori loše volje three parts of the studio album titled Trilogija, although all three were released separately. All the songs from three EPs were released on the compilation album Trilogija.

== Album cover ==
The album cover was designed by Jugoslav and Jakša Vlahović.

== Track listing ==
No.	Title	Lyrics	Music	Length
1.	"Bilo je žena (There Were Women)"	B. Đorđević	B. Đorđević	5:02
2.	"Leti čiča preko bare (The Bird Flies Over The Pond)"	B. Đorđević	B. Đorđević	3:46
3.	"Devičanska ostrva (Virgin Islands)"	B. Đorđević	B. Đorđević	3:42
4.	"Pesma sa porukom (A Song With A Message)"	B. Đorđević	N. Zorić	3:27
5.	"Pandorina kutija (Pandora's Box)"	B. Đorđević	B. Đorđević	3:12

== Personnel ==
- Bora Đorđević - vocals
- Vidoja Božinović - guitar
- Miša Aleksić - bass guitar, co-producer
- Vicko Milatović - drums
- Nikola Zorić - keyboards, recorded by

=== Additional personnel ===
- Željko Savić - backing vocals
- Milan Popović - producer
- Uroš Marković - recorded by
- Oliver Jovanović - engineer, mixed by, mastered by
