= Warriors (1984 Warriors album) =

Studio album by Warriors
- Released: 1984
- Genre: Heavy metal
- Length: 36:30
- Label: Attic Records
- Producer: Fraser Hill; Rick Hutt

Warriors chronology
Warriors (1983)	Warriors (1984)

Warriors is the second and last studio album by Yugoslav/Canadian heavy metal band Warriors, released in 1984. It is the band's second self-titled album, after their first studio album, released in 1983.

== Background ==
After the release of their first album, Warriors moved from Belgrade, Yugoslavia to Toronto, Canada, the home country of their guitarist Douglass Platt. In Toronto they were joined by drummer Lawrence Gretsch, formerly of Frank Soda & The Imps. The band signed for Canadian record label Attic Records and in 1984 recorded their second self-titled album. After the album release, the band went on a short tour with Nazareth, disbanding shortly after.

== Album cover ==
The album cover, designed by Zoran Blažina, was, with a different Warriors logo, originally used as the cover for the band's debut release, the EP Warriors – Ratnici, released in 1983.

== Track listing ==
All songs credited to Dušan Nikolić, Douglas Platt, Zoran Konjević and Slobodan Svrdlan

No.	Title	Length
1.	"Try Again"	4:10
2.	"You Keep on Shining"	3:48
3.	"Diana"	3:38
4.	"I'm Begging You"	3:37
5.	"Once a Year"	4:19
6.	"God Save the Children"	4:53
7.	"Flight of the Children"	3:53
8.	"Money Lover"	3:27
9.	"Carry On"	5:08

== Personnel ==
- Dušan Nikolić - vocals
- Douglas Platt - guitar, backing vocals
- Zoran Konjević - guitar, backing vocals
- Slobodan Svrdlan - bass guitar, backing vocals
- Lawrence Gretsch - drums

=== Additional personnel ===
- Fraser Hill - producer
- Rick Hutt - producer, arrangements
- Dan Baker - recording
- Paul Shubat - recording
- Vic Pyle - recording
- Dave Dixon - recording
- Ed Stone - recording
- Noel Golden - recording
- Michael Wagener - mixing
- Walter Zwol - mixing
- Wyn Davis - mixing assistant
- Zoran Blažina - artwork
- Patrick Harbron - photography
- Dean Motter - design
