= Od Vardara pa do Triglava (album) =

Live album by Riblja Čorba
- Released: 2 October 1996
- Recorded: 1988
- Genre: Hard rock
- Length: 113:03
- Label: One Records

Riblja Čorba chronology
Ostalo je ćutanje (1996)	Od Vardara pa do Triglava (1996)	Treći srpski ustanak (1997)

Od Vardara pa do Triglava (trans. From the Vardar to Triglav) is the double live and the third live album by Serbian and former Yugoslav and rock band Riblja Čorba, released in 1996. The album was compiled of bootlegs recorded on Riblja Čorba concerts held in 1988, during their Yugoslav tour.

In 2017, the label One Records reissued the album as a Digipak with a slightly different cover and a cardboard slipcase.

== Album cover ==
The album cover features the emblem of the Socialist Federal Republic of Yugoslavia.

== Track listing ==
=== Disc 1 ===
1. "Ostani đubre do kraja" - 6:52
2. "Ljuti Rock 'n' Roll" - 4:33
3. "Tu nema Boga, nema pravde" - 3:58
4. "Kad padne noć (Upomoć)" - 6:57
5. "Lud sto posto" - 7:59
6. "Kaži, ko te ljubi dok sam ja na straži" - 4:09
7. "Prošlosti (Nisi bila bogzna šta)" - 6:34
8. "Neke su žene pratile vojnike" - 5:32
9. "Nemoj da ideš mojom ulicom" - 4:56
10. "Južna Afrika '85 (Ja ću da pevam)" - 4:16
11. "Lutka sa naslovne strane" - 4:16

=== Disc 2 ===
1. "Ostaću slobodan" - 2:35
2. "Znam te (Drugoga voli)" - 4:34
3. "Propala noć" - 3:44
4. "Pogledaj dom svoj, anđele" - 4:04
5. "Celu noć te sanjam" - 6:11
6. "Napolju" - 5:28
7. "Oko mene" - 4:09
8. "Amsterdam" - 3:53
9. "Svirao je Dejvid Bovi" - 3:33
10. "Zadnji voz za Čačak" - 3:12
11. "Avionu, slomiću ti krila" - 3:52
12. "Član mafije" - 6:46

== Personnel ==
- Bora Đorđević - vocals, harmonica
- Vidoja Božinović - guitar
- Nikola Čuturilo - guitar
- Miša Aleksić - bass guitar
- Miroslav Milatović - drums

== See also ==
- "Jugoslavijo"
