= Beograd, uživo '97 – 2 =

Beograd, uživo '97 - 2

Live album by Riblja Čorba
- Released: November 25, 1997
- Recorded: June 1, 1997
- Venue: Tašmajdan Stadium (Belgrade)
- Genre: Hard rock
- Length: 56:10
- Label: Hi-Fi Centar

Riblja Čorba chronology
Beograd, uživo '97 – 1 (1997)	Beograd, uživo '97 - 2 (1997)	Nojeva barka (1999)

Beograd, uživo '97 – 2 (trans. Belgrade, Live '97 – 2) is the second disc of the fourth live album by Serbian and former Yugoslav rock band Riblja Čorba, released in 1997. Beograd, uživo '97 - 2 was preceded by Beograd, uživo '97 - 1, as the band, instead of releasing a double live album, opted for two separate releases. Album was recorded on Riblja Čorba concert held on June 1, 1997, at Tašmajdan Stadium in Belgrade.

== Track listing ==
1. "Dva dinara druže"- 6:50
2. "Vetar duva, duva, duva" - 1:48
3. "Dobro jutro" - 5:38
4. "Južna Afrika '85 (Ja ću da pevam)" - 4:46
5. "Amsterdam - 5:10
6. "Avionu slomiću ti krila" - 4:14
7. "Zelena trava doma mog" - 3:50
8. "Kada padne noć (Upomoć)" - 7:54
9. "Pogledaj dom svoj, anđele" - 6:35
10. "Kad sam bio mlad" - 2:58
11. "Lutka sa naslovne strane" - 2:46
12. "Ostani đubre do kraja" - 5:51

== Personnel ==
- Bora Đorđević - vocals, acoustic guitar
- Vidoja Božinović - guitar
- Miša Aleksić - bass guitar
- Vicko Milatović - drums
- Vlada Barjaktarević - keyboards
