= Warriors – Ratnici =

EP by Warriors
- Released: 1983
- Recorded: 1983
- Genre: Heavy metal
- Length: 10:27
- Label: PGP-RTB

Warriors chronology
| Warriors – Ratnici (1983) | Warriors (1983) |

Warriors – Ratnici, unofficially known as Love Machine, is the 1983 debut EP released by Yugoslav/Canadian heavy metal band Warriors.

== Background ==
Warriors were formed in 1982 by vocalist Dušan Nikolić and drummer Miroslav "Vicko" Milatović and were originally named Ratnici (Serbo-Croatian for Warriors). Milatović was at the time a member of highly successful band Riblja Čorba, Ratnici being his side project. The first lineup of the band also featured guitarist Dragan Deletić, guitarist Zoran Konjević and bass guitarist Slobodan Svrdlan (a former member of the band Gordi). In 1983, the band released their debut EP with four songs, two of them with English and two with Serbo-Croatian language lyrics, through Yugoslav record label PGP-RTB. The songs "Love Machine" and "Kad me ljubiš" ("When You Kiss Me") feature the same composition but in different mix, which is also the case with "I Am Alive" and "Skiti tu ploču" ("Stop That Record").

Shortly after the EP release, Milatović had to leave the band due to his mandatory stint in the Yugoslav People's Army, the EP being the only Warriors release with him on drums. Warriors – Ratnici was also the band's only release recorded with Deletić, who was shortly after the EP release replaced by Canadian guitarist Douglass Platt.

== Cover art ==
The cover art, designed by Zoran Blažina, was (with a modified Warriors logo) later used as a cover for the band's second full-length album, Warriors.

== Track listing ==
| No. | Title | Length |
|---|---|---|
| 1. | "Love Machine" | 2:55 |
| 2. | "I Am Alive" | 2:24 |
| 3. | "Kad me ljubiš" ("When You Kiss Me") | 2:54 |
| 4. | "Skini tu ploču" ("Stop That Record") | 2:14 |

== Personnel ==
- Dušan Nikolić - vocals
- Zoran Konjević - guitar
- Dragan Deletić - guitar
- Slobodan Svrdlan - bass guitar
- Miroslav Milatović - drums

== Legacy ==
In 2021 the songs "Love Machine" and "Skini tu ploču" were ranked 44th and 51st respectively on the list of 100 Greatest Yugoslav Hard & Heavy Anthems by web magazine Balkanrock.
