= Labudova pesma =

Studio album by Riblja Čorba
- Released: March 7, 1992
- Recorded: October 1991 – January 1992
- Studio: Ambient House Studio, Vienna
- Genre: Hard rock
- Length: 33:06
- Label: Samy
- Producer: Riblja Čorba

Riblja Čorba chronology
Koza nostra (1990)	Labudova pesma (1992)	Zbogom, Srbijo (1993)

Labudova pesma (trans. Swan Song) is the eleventh studio album from Serbian and former Yugoslav rock band Riblja Čorba, released in 1992.

== Recording and reception ==
As the Yugoslav Wars broke out in 1991, the band intended to release Labudova pesma as their last album (and named it according to their decision), but they eventually changed the decision to disband. The album was recorded in Vienna at the end of the first year of the wars. On the album recording, the band cooperated with Oliver Mandić. The intention was for Mandić to become an official band member (as the keyboardist), however, due to the fight between Mandić and the band's frontman Bora Đorđević, the cooperation ended and the songs "Vukovar", "Prodavnica snova", "Zbogom pameti", "Šta još možeš da mi daš" and "Na pola puta do sreće" written by and recorded with Mandić were not released on the album. The album was released through the independent record label Samy.

Although Đorđević would soon become an active supporter of the Serbian troops in Republika Srpska and the Republic of Serbian Krajina, the album included a number of anti-war songs: a cappella "Dok padaju glave", prayer "Amin", and "Rat je završen". Nevertheless, the album's only hit was "Kad sam bio mlad", a cover of Eric Burdon's song "When I Was Young".

== Album cover ==
The album cover was designed by Jugoslav Vlahović.

== Track listing ==
No.	Title	Lyrics	Music	Length
1.	"Dok padaju glave" ("While the Heads are Rolling")	B. Đorđević	B. Đorđević	2:54
2.	"Amin" ("Amen")	B. Đorđević	M. Milatović	4:30
3.	"Noćas gubim meč" ("I'm Losing the Fight Tonight")	B. Đorđević	V. Božinović	4:45
4.	"Bahnhof"	B. Đorđević	V. Božinović	3:31
5.	"Bože" ("Oh, God")	B. Đorđević	V. Božinović	4:05
6.	"Rat je završen" ("The War Is Over")	B. Đorđević	Z. Ilić	3:07
7.	"Kad sam bio mlad" ("When I Was Young")	B. Đorđević	E. Burdon	3:24
8.	"Idi sad" ("Go Now")	B. Đorđević	D. Nikodijević	3:54

=== 2001 One Records reissue bonus track ===
No.	Title	Lyrics	Music	Length
9.	"Jebi ga" ("Fuck it")	B. Đorđević	B. Đorđević	2:56

== Personnel ==
- Bora Đorđević - vocals
- Vidoja Božinović - guitar
- Zoran Ilić - guitar
- Miša Aleksić - bass guitar
- Vicko Milatović - drums

=== Additional personnel ===
- Štefan - keyboards
- Fred - guitar, recorded by
