= Warriors (1983 Warriors album) =

Studio album by Warriors
- Released: 1983
- Recorded: July and August 1983
- Studio: RTB Studio V, Belgrade
- Genre: Heavy metal
- Length: 38:00
- Label: PGP-RTB
- Producer: Warriors

Warriors chronology
Warriors – Ratnici (1983)	Warriors (1983)	Warriors (1984)

Warriors is the first studio album by Yugoslav/Canadian heavy metal band Warriors, released in 1983. It is the band's first self-titled album, the second being their second (and last) album, released in 1984.

== Background and recording ==
Warriors were formed in 1982 by vocalist Dušan Nikolić and drummer Miroslav "Vicko" Milatović. Milatović was at the time a member of highly successful band Riblja Čorba, Warriors being his side project. The first lineup of the band also featured guitarist Dragan Deletić, guitarist Zoran Konjević and bass guitarist Slobodan Svrdlan (a former member of the band Gordi). In 1983 this lineup of the band released the EP entitled Warriors – Ratnici, after which Milatović had to leave the band due to his mandatory stint in the Yugoslav People's Army, and soon after Canadian guitarist Douglass Platt replaced Deletić. The band recorded their debut album with drummer Tom Martin (a former member of the band Izazov), who was, however, not credited as an official band member. The album was recorded during July and August 1983 in Radio Television Belgrade Studio V and produced by band members themselves.

== Track listing ==
All songs credited to Warriors.

No.	Title	Length
1.	"Genocide"	3:38
2.	"Any Longer"	4:00
3.	"I Am Begging You"	3:29
4.	"Diana"	3:38
5.	"All the Time"	4:58
6.	"Rider"	6:22
7.	"I Am Alive"	2:28
8.	"Love Machine"	2:57
9.	"Feel Me"	3:24
10.	"Carry On"	5:02

== Personnel ==
- Dušan Nikolić - vocals
- Douglas Platt - guitar
- Zoran Konjević - guitar
- Slobodan Svrdlan - bass guitar

=== Additional personnel ===
- Tom Martin - drums
- Sloba Marković - keyboards
- Predrag Jakovljević - percussion
- Dragan Vukiċević - engineer, backing vocals (on track 9)
- Zoran Blažina - artwork, graphic design
- Marko Bralić - photography

== Legacy ==
In 2015 Warriors album cover, designed by Zoran Blažina, was ranked 33rd on the list of 100 Greatest Album Covers of Yugoslav Rock by web magazine Balkanrock.
