= Ovde =

Studio album by Riblja Čorba
- Released: December 17, 2003
- Recorded: October 1 – November 20, 2003; O Studio, Belgrade
- Genre: Hard rock
- Length: 47:05
- Label: Hi-Fi Centar
- Producer: Milan Popović; Miša Aleksić

Riblja Čorba chronology
Pišanje uz vetar (2001)	Ovde (2003)	Trilogija 1: Nevinost bez zaštite (2005)

Professional ratings
Review scores
Source	Rating
Monitor	4/5 stars

Ovde (trans. Here) is the sixteenth studio album from Serbian and former Yugoslav rock band Riblja Čorba, released in 2003.

The album featured a bonus CD with songs containing explicit lyrics: "Zašto uvek kurcu sviram" and "Pičkin dim".

Ovde is Riblja Čorba's first album that featured the band's current keyboardist Nikola Zorić who replaced Vlada Barjaktarević. However, the album was recorded by Barjaktarević.

== Album cover ==
The album cover, designed by Jugoslav and Jakša Vlahović, features a drowning man displaying the Serbian three-finger salute, with the band's logo superimposed. The four letters of the title are placed in the four corners of the album cover.

== Track listing ==
No.	Title	Lyrics	Music	Length
1.	"Mobilni (Mobile)"	B. Đorđević	D. Davies	3:43
2.	"Govnovalj (Shitslide)"	B. Đorđević	B. Đorđević	4:44
3.	"Poslednja pesma o tebi (Last Song About You)"	B. Đorđević	B. Đorđević	4:31
4.	"Plajvaz (Pen)"	B. Đorđević	B. Đorđević	3:00
5.	"Ovde (Here)"	B. Đorđević	V. Božinović	5:46
6.	"100 godina samoće (A Hundred Years Of Loneliness)"	B. Đorđević	M. Aleksić	4:11
7.	"Ko o čemu (Who About What)"	B. Đorđević	B. Đorđević	2:14
8.	"Ja sam rođen namrgođen (I Was Born Grumpy)"	B. Đorđević	B. Đorđević	2:57
9.	"Mrtvo more (Dead Sea)"	B. Đorđević	B. Đorđević	4:01
10.	"Novi svetski poredak (New World Order)"	B. Đorđević	V. Božinović, B. Đorđević	5:03

=== Bonus disc ===
No.	Title	Lyrics	Music	Length
1.	"Zašto uvek kurcu sviram (Why Do I Always Dick Whistle)"	B. Đorđević	B. Đorđević	3:16
2.	"Pičkin dim (Pussy Smoke)"	B. Đorđević	B. Đorđević	3:39

== Personnel ==
- Bora Đorđević - vocals
- Vidoja Božinović - guitar
- Miša Aleksić - bass guitar, co-producer
- Vicko Milatović - drums
- Nikola Zorić - keyboard

=== Additional personnel ===
- Dejan Cukić - backing vocals
- Momčilo Bajagić - backing vocals
- Đorđe David - backing vocals
- Biljana Krstić - backing vocals
- Željko Savić - backing vocals
- Aleksandar Petković - saxophone
- Milan Popović - producer
- Vlada Barjaktarević - recorded by
- Uroš Marković - recorded by
- Oliver Jovanović - mastered by, post-production
