= Beograd, uživo '97 – 1 =

Live album by Riblja Čorba
- Released: November 25, 1997
- Recorded: June 1, 1997
- Venue: Tašmajdan Stadium (Belgrade)
- Genre: Hard rock
- Length: 55:34
- Label: Hi-Fi Centar

Riblja Čorba chronology
Treći srpski ustanak (1997)	Beograd, uživo '97 – 1 (1997)	Beograd, uživo '97 – 2 (1997)

Beograd, uživo '97 – 1 (trans. Belgrade, Live '97 - 1) is the first disc of the fourth live album by Serbian and former Yugoslav rock band Riblja Čorba, released in 1997. Beograd, uživo '97 - 1 was followed by Beograd, uživo '97 - 2, as the band, instead of releasing a double live album, opted for two separate releases. Album was recorded on Riblja Čorba concert held on June 1, 1997, on Belgrade's Tašmajdan Stadium.

== Track listing ==
1. "Zvezda potkrovlja i suterena" - 4:45
2. "Volim i ja vas" - 3:42
3. "Ljubomorko" - 3:57
4. "Gnjilane" - 7:51
5. "Priča o Džigi Bau" - 7:15
6. "Gastarbajterska pesma" - 7:37
7. "Baba Jula" - 4:51
8. "Danas nema mleka" - 5:48
9. "Jedino moje" - 5:19
10. "Neću da ispadnem životinja" - 4:29

== Personnel ==
- Bora Đorđević - vocals
- Vidoja Božinović - guitar
- Miša Aleksić - bass guitar
- Vicko Milatović - drums
- Vlada Barjaktarević - keyboards
