= Vicko Milatović =

Serbian musician (born 1959)

Miroslav Milatović
- Also known as: Vicko
- Born: 9 May 1959 (age 67); Belgrade, SR Serbia, Yugoslavia
- Genres: Hard rock; blues rock; heavy metal; children's music
- Occupations: Musician, songwriter
- Instruments: Drums, vocals, percussion, bass guitar, keyboards, guitar
- Years active: 1976–present
- Labels: PGP RTB, Jugoton, Samy, WIT, Hi-Fi Centar, Kanal D Production, M Factory, City Records

Miroslav "Vicko" Milatović (Serbian Cyrillic: Мирослав-Вицко Милатовић) is a Serbian musician best known as the drummer for the Serbian and Yugoslav rock band Riblja Čorba.

Milatović first gained prominence in the late 1970s. as the member of the Belgrade band SOS, which enjoyed some local popularity. In 1978, SOS members and vocalist Bora Đorđević formed the band Riblja Čorba, which went on to become one of the most popular and influential acts of the Yugoslav rock scene. Milatović has been the member of Riblja Čorba throughout the band's whole career, with only a short one-year absence from the group due to his mandatory army stint. In addition to working with Riblja Čorba, he started two side projects—the heavy metal band Warriors and the hard rock band Indijanci—and released two solo albums.

== Biography ==
=== Early career (1976–1978) ===
Miroslav Milatović started his career as the drummer for the band Born, also featuring Željko Nikolić (who would later perform with Zebra and Roze Poze, guitar and vocals), Vladimir Klipa (bass guitar) and Miodrag Živadinović (keyboards), one of the later lineups of the band also featuring the future vocalist of Generacija 5 Goran Milošević. The band performed covers, as well as their own material, which was never officially released, although a bootleg with the recording of their 1977 concert at the Palma discotheque appeared in 1986. After Born disbanded in 1977, Milatović became a member of the band SOS, which had already released three 7-inch singles and gained attention of the Yugoslav music press and some local popularity.

=== Riblja Čorba (1978–present) ===
In 1978, SOS members Vicko Milatović, Miša Aleksić and Rajko Kojić formed Riblja Čorba with former Suncokret and Rani Mraz member Bora Đorđević. Riblja Čorba gained the attention of the media and the audience with their debut single, "Lutka sa naslovne strane" ("Doll from the Front Cover"), and gained nationwide popularity with their 1979 debut album Kost u grlu (Bone in the Throat). Their following releases, Pokvarena mašta i prljave strasti (Perverted Imagination and Sordid Passions, 1981), Mrtva priroda (Still Life, 1981) and Buvlja pijaca (Flea Market, 1982), launched them to the top of the Yugoslav rock scene. The band managed to maintain their popularity until the dissolution of Yugoslavia, but it has declined after the breakup of the country, largely due to the controversial political attitudes of the band's frontman Bora Đorđević. Milatović has remained the band's member since its formation until today. He was absent from the band only for a short 1983—1984 period, due to his mandatory stint in the Yugoslav army. During this period, he was replaced by Vladimir "Vlajko" Golubović, with whom Riblja Čorba recorded the 1984 album Večeras vas zabavljaju muzičari koji piju (Tonight You Will Be Entertained by Musicians Who Drink), which is the band's only album not to feature Milatović on drums.

=== Side projects ===
==== Warriors (1982–1983) ====
In 1982, Milatović started the heavy metal band Warriors with vocalist Duško Nikolić, managing to record and release only the 1983 EP Warriors – Ratnici with the group before his army service. After Milatović left both Riblja Čorba and Warriors because of his army stint, Warriors recorded their debut album with session drummer Tom Martin, and later moved to Canada.

==== Indijanci (1994–1997) ====
In 1994, Milatović formed the hard rock band Indijanci. The band consisted of Milatović (vocals) Goran Repinc (guitar), Slavko Radosavljević (bass guitar) and Miljko Radonjić (of the band Block Out, drums). The band released two studio albums, self-titled debut in 1995 and Ne može biti veselije (Couldn't Be Merrier) in 1997. The albums were poorly received by the music critics, largely due to their pornographic lyrics, and the band ended their activity after the release of their second album.

==== Solo albums ====
In 1986, Milatović released his first solo album, U ritmu srca malog dobošara (In the Rhythm of the Little Drummer's Heart). The album was produced by Kornelije Kovač and featured Milatović on vocals, Milatović's former bandmate from Warriors Dragan Deletić "Delta" on guitar, Miodrag Živanović on guitar, Dragan Gajić on bass guitar and Zoran Radovanović "Baki" on drums. The material released on the album was written by Milatović, part of it during Mrtva priroda recording sessions, and another part during his work with Warriors. To promote the album, Milatović formed a support band named Vicko Band, consisting of Živanović, Gajić and Radovanović with addition of Toma Babović (keyboards) and Zoran Veljković "Kiza" (formerly of U Škripcu, guitar). After three months of promotional concerts, Vicko Band disbanded due to Milatović's obligations towards Riblja Čorba.

In 2003, Milatović released the children's music album Dečaci o devojčicama (Boys about Girls). The album featured ten songs, all written by Milatović, and each song featured different vocalist: beside Milatović, vocals were recorded by Bora Đorđević, Momčilo Bajagić, Đorđe David, Billy King, Žika Milenković, Prljavi Inspektor Blaža, Miroslav "Pile" Živanović, Zvonimir Đukić and Dejan Cukić.

=== Other projects ===
In 1990, Milatović joined the band Delta Project, formed by Dragan Deletić "Delta" (guitar), and also featuring Željko Marinović (vocals and keyboards) and Slavko Radosavljević (bass guitar). The band made demo recordings, but never released any material, as Deletić and Marinković moved to the United States with the outbreak of Yugoslav Wars.

In 1999, Milatović performed with Minđušari on their Republika Srpska tour, and was a member of club bands Old Spice and Joker. In 1998, he wrote music, sung, played all the instruments and produced the album Strah od pletenja (Fear of Knitting) by rapper Šabanotti. He worked with Šabanotti on his 2001 album Pink Frojd (Pink Freud), appearing on the album as co-author, vocalist and co-producer.

In 2007, he wrote two songs and co-authored one song for the children's music album Ekološka žurka (Ecological Party) by the children's choir Horislavci.

For a number of years he was the editor for the record label Hi-Fi Centar.

== Discography ==
=== Riblja Čorba ===
==== Studio albums ====
- Kost u grlu (1979)
- Pokvarena mašta i prljave strasti (1981)
- Mrtva priroda (1981)
- Buvlja pijaca (1982)
- Istina (1985)
- Osmi nervni slom (1986)
- Ujed za dušu (1987)
- Priča o ljubavi obično ugnjavi (1988)
- Koza nostra (1990)
- Labudova pesma (1992)
- Zbogom, Srbijo (1993)
- Ostalo je ćutanje (1996)
- Nojeva barka (1999)
- Pišanje uz vetar (2001)
- Ovde (2003)
- Minut sa njom (2009)
- Uzbuna (2012)
- Da tebe nije (2019)

=== Live albums ===
- U ime naroda (1982)
- Nema laži, nema prevare - Zagreb uživo `85 (1995)
- Od Vardara pa do Triglava (1996)
- Beograd, uživo '97 - 1 (1997)
- Beograd, uživo '97 - 2 (1997)
- Gladijatori u BG Areni (2007)
- Niko nema ovakve ljude! (2010)
- Koncert za brigadire (2012)
- Beograd 1981 (2021)

==== EPs ====
- Trilogija 1: Nevinost bez zaštite (2005)
- Trilogija 2: Devičanska ostrva (2006)
- Trilogija 3: Ambasadori loše volje (2006)

=== Warriors ===
==== EPs ====
- Warriors – Ratnici (1983)

=== Solo ===
==== Studio albums ====
- U ritmu srca malog dobošara (1986)
- Dečaci o devojčicama (2003)
- Rock Zoo (2011)

=== Indijanci ===
==== Studio albums ====
- Indijanci (1995)
- Ne može biti veselije (1997)

== Bibliography ==
- EX YU ROCK enciklopedija 1960-2006, Janjatović Petar; ISBN 978-86-905317-1-4
- Riblja čorba, Jakovljević Mirko; ISBN 86-83525-39-2
