= Trilogija 1: Nevinost bez zaštite =

EP by Riblja Čorba
- Released: December 27, 2005
- Recorded: Studio O, November 2005
- Genre: Hard rock
- Length: 14:46
- Label: M Factory
- Producer: Milan Popović; Miša Aleksić

Riblja Čorba chronology
Ovde (2005)	Trilogija 1: Nevinost bez zaštite (2005)	Trilogija 2: Devičanska ostrva (2006)

Trilogija 1: Nevinost bez zaštite (trans. Trilogy 1: Virginity Without Protection) is the first EP from Serbian and former Yugoslav rock band Riblja Čorba. It is the first part of the Riblja Čorba trilogy released during 2005 and 2006. The band considers EPs Trilogija 1: Nevinost bez zaštite, Trilogija 2: Devičanska ostrva and Trilogija 3: Ambasadori loše volje three parts of the studio album titled Trilogija, although all three were released separately. All the songs from three EPs were released on the compilation album Trilogija.

The EP features Marija Mihajlović and Marija Dokmanović on backing vocals.

== Album cover ==
The album cover was designed by Jugoslav and Jakša Vlahović.

== Track listing ==
No.	Title	Lyrics	Music	Length
1.	"Sponzori (Sponsors)"	B. Đorđević	B. Đorđević	3:12
2.	"Jedini način (The Only Way)"	B. Đorđević	B. Đorđević	3:30
3.	"Dijabola (Devil)"	B. Đorđević	B. Đorđević	3:26
4.	"Pomalo tužno (A Little Bit Sad)"	B. Đorđević	V. Božinović	4:38

== Personnel ==
- Bora Đorđević - vocals
- Vidoja Božinović - guitar
- Miša Aleksić - bass guitar, co-producer
- Vicko Milatović - drums
- Nikola Zorić - keyboard, recorded by

=== Additional personnel ===
- Marija Mihajlović - backing vocals
- Marija Dokmanović - backing vocals
- Milan Popović - producer
- Oliver Jovanović - engineer, mixed by, mastered by
