= Pišanje uz vetar =

Studio album by Riblja Čorba
- Released: November 27, 2001
- Recorded: Studio O, 3 September – 25 October 2001
- Genre: Hard rock: heavy metal; reggae; Balkan Brass Band
- Length: 55:15
- Label: Hi-Fi Centar
- Producer: Milan Popović; Miša Aleksić

Riblja Čorba chronology
Nojeva barka (1999)	Pišanje uz vetar (2001)	Ovde (2003)

Professional ratings
Review scores
Source	Rating
Monitor	2/5 stars
Rock Express	8/10 stars

Pišanje uz vetar (trans. Pissing Against the Wind) is the fifteenth studio album from Serbian and former Yugoslav rock band Riblja Čorba, released in 2001.

Reggae tracks "Crno beli svet" and "Crno beli svet (I opet)" featured Eyesburn frontman Nemanja Kojić on vocals and trombone. The track "Srbin je lud" featured Dejan Cukić on backing vocals. "Prokockan život" i "Čekajući čoveka" featured Marija Mihajlović on vocals. Balkan brass band tracks "Po livadi rosnoj" and "Hoću, majko, hoću" featured Boban Marković trumpet orchestra. "Zašto sam otišao blues" features the band's guitarist Vidoja Božinović's brother Zoran Božinović on solo guitar. "Čekajući čoveka" features the actor Josif Tatić.

The song, "Daj mi lovu", is a cover of The Who song "Boris the Spider" (although written by John Entwistle, on Pišanje uz vetar was credited to Pete Townshend).

== Album cover ==
The album cover was designed by Jugoslav Vlahović.

== Track listing ==
No.	Title	Lyrics	Music	Length
1.	"Crno beli svet (Black And White World)"	B. Đorđević	M. Aleksić	3:58
2.	"Srbin je lud (The Serb Is Crazy)"	B. Đorđević	B. Đorđević	2:59
3.	"Ljubav ovde više ne stanuje (Love No Longer Lives Here)"	B. Đorđević	B. Đorđević	4:27
4.	"Duša nije na prodaju (The Soul Is Not For Sale)"	B. Đorđević	V. Božinović	6:01
5.	"Čiviluk (Coat Hanger)"	B. Đorđević	V. Božinović	3:35
6.	"Po livadi rosnoj (Across The Dewy Meadow)"	B. Đorđević	B. Đorđević	2:36
7.	"Hoću, majko, hoću (I Want, Mother, I Want)"	B. Đorđević	B. Đorđević	2:58
8.	"Daj mi lovu (Give Me Money)"	B. Đorđević	J. Entwistle	3:02
9.	"Neka me ubije grom (Let Lightning Strike Me Down)"	B. Đorđević	M. Milatović	4:23
10.	"Čekajući čoveka (Waiting For The Man)"	B. Đorđević	M. Milatović	5:23
11.	"Prokockan život (A Life Gambled Away)"	B. Đorđević	M. Aleksić	3:03
12.	"Zašto sam otišao bluz (Why Did I Go Blues)"	B. Đorđević	V. Božinović, M. Aleksić	5:06
13.	"Nebeski narod (Heavenly People)"	B. Đorđević	B. Đorđević	4:58
14.	"Crno beli svet (I opet) (Black And White World (And Again))"	B. Đorđević	M. Aleksić	1:55

== Personnel ==
- Bora Đorđević - vocals
- Vidoja Božinović - guitar
- Miša Aleksić - bass guitar, producer
- Vicko Milatović - drums
- Vladimir Barjaktarević - keyboards, engineer

=== Additional personnel ===
- Nemanja Kojić - vocals, trombone (on tracks: 1, 14)
- Marija Mihajlović - vocals, backing vocals (on tracks: 10, 11)
- Dejan Cukić - backing vocals (on track 2)
- Željko Savić - backing vocals (on track 9)
- Zoran Božinović - guitar (solo on track 12)
- Josif Tatić - speech
- St George String Orchestra (on tracks: 4, 5):
  - Goran Uzelac - violin
  - Miroslav Lazić - violin
  - Ivana Uzelac - viola
  - Mirjana Crnojević - viola
  - Mileta Stanković - cello
  - Dušan Stojanović - cello
- Boban Marković trumpet orchestra (on tracks: 6, 7):
  - Boban Marković
  - Jovica Ajdarević
  - Srđan Spasić
  - Momčilo Krstić
  - Dragoljub Eminović
  - Selistar Eminović
  - Ašim Ajdanović
  - Srđan Eminović
  - Saša Ališanović
  - Dragoljub Eminović
  - Neđat Zuberović
  - Ašmet Eminović
- Milan Popović - producer
- Oliver Jovanović - engineer
- Dino Dolničar - recorded by
