= Treći srpski ustanak =

Compilation album by Riblja Čorba
- Released: April 5, 1997
- Recorded: 1981 – 1997
- Genre: Hard rock; heavy metal; blues rock
- Length: 68:50
- Label: BB Records

Riblja Čorba chronology
Ostalo je ćutanje (1996)	Treći srpski ustanak (1997)	Beograd, uživo '97 – 1 (1999)

Treći srpski ustanak (trans. The Third Serbian Uprising) is a compilation album from Serbian and former Yugoslav rock band Riblja Čorba, released in 1997.

The album features a choice of Riblja Čorba songs with political-related lyrics recorded and released between 1981 and 1996. Album also features the tracks "Snage opozicije", (recorded in 1985 for the album Istina, but unreleased), "Pacovi iz podruma" (recorded in 1986, previously unreleased), "Crni mercedes" (from the band's frontman Bora Đorđević's solo album Bora priča gluposti), "Seljačine" and "Baba Jula" (from Đorđević's solo album Njihovi dani) and the new song "Volim i ja vas" (recorded in 1997).

== Track listing ==
1. "Na zapadu ništa novo" - 3:03
2. "Slušaj sine, obriši sline" - 2:48
3. "Kako je lepo biti glup" - 2:17
4. "Džukele će me dokusuriti" - 3:17
5. "Pogledaj dom svoj, anđele" - 3:39
6. "Snage opozicije" - 2:39
7. "Dvorska budala" - 2:52
8. "Tu nema Boga, nema pravde" - 3:04
9. "Južna Afrika '85. (Ja ću da pevam)" - 3:25
10. "Pacovi iz podruma" - 2:41
11. "Član mafije" - 3:04
12. "Crni mercedes" - 0:56
13. "Al Kapone" - 3:50
14. "Tito je vaš" - 4:48
15. "Žikica Jovanović Španac" - 3:04
16. "Bože" - 4:04
17. "Danas nema mleka" - 3:40
18. "Rapsodija u plavom" - 3:07
19. "Seljačine" - 2:43
20. "Diktator" - 3:00
21. "Baba Jula" - 3:01
22. "Volim i ja vas" - 3:15
