= Minut sa njom =

Studio album by Riblja Čorba
- Released: February 5, 2009
- Recorded: November 7 – December 27, 2008
- Genre: Hard rock
- Length: 50:51
- Label: City Records
- Producer: Milan Popović

Riblja Čorba chronology
Gladijatori u BG Areni (2008)	Minut sa njom (2009)	Niko nema ovakve ljude! (2010)

Professional ratings
Review scores
Source	Rating
Balkanrock	3.5/5 stars
Mikrofonija	(mixed)
Muzika.hr	4.5/5 stars
Popboks	3/10 stars

Minut sa njom (trans. A Minute with Her) is the eighteenth studio album from Serbian and former Yugoslav rock band Riblja Čorba.

The album features mostly love songs and is the first Riblja Čorba album since their 1981 album Pokvarena mašta i prljave strasti which does not feature any songs with political-related lyrics.

== Album cover ==
The album cover was designed by Jugoslav and Jakša Vlahović.

== Track listing ==
No.	Title	Lyrics	Music	Length
1.	"Radiću šta god hoću (I'll Do Whatever I Want)"	B. Đorđević	B. Đorđević	2:31
2.	"Gde li je ljubav (Where Is The Love)"	B. Đorđević	B. Đorđević	3:51
3.	"Bože, koliko je volim (God, How Much I Love Her)"	B. Đorđević	B. Đorđević, V. Božinović	3:40
4.	"Krilati pegazi (Winged Pegasi)"	B. Đorđević	M. Milatović	4:35
5.	"Odlazim (I'm Leaving)"	B. Đorđević	B. Đorđević	3:41
6.	"Minut sa njom (A Minute With Her)"	B. Đorđević	B. Đorđević	4:14
7.	"Uspomene (Memories)"	B. Đorđević	V. Božinović	4:28
8.	"Moj Jenki going home (Prokleta je Amerika) (My Yankie Going Home) (Damn America))"	B. Đorđević	B. Đorđević	4:04
9.	"Muško od plastelina (A Man Of Plasteline)"	B. Đorđević	B. Đorđević	4:04
10.	"Orfej (Orpheus)"	B. Đorđević	M. Aleksić, B. Đorđević	4:26
11.	"Razmažena devojčica (Spoiled Girl)"	B. Đorđević	M. Aleksić	3:38
12.	"Dan zaljubljenih (Valentine's Day)"	B. Đorđević	N. Zorić, B. Đorđević	4:22
13.	"Ja se zaista ne sećam (I Really Don't Remember)"	B. Đorđević	B. Đorđević	3:15

== Personnel ==
- Bora Đorđević - vocals
- Vidoja Božinović - guitar
- Miša Aleksić - bass guitar
- Vicko Milatović - drums
- Nikola Zorić - keyboards

=== Additional personnel ===
- Đorđe David - backing vocals (on "Krilati pegazi")
- Milan Popović - producer
- Goran Šimpraga - engineer
- Bojana Tomašević - engineer
- Nenad Dragićević - technician
