= Priča o ljubavi obično ugnjavi =

Studio album by Riblja Čorba
- Released: September 14, 1988
- Recorded: 1988
- Studio: Studio V PGP-RTB, Belgrade
- Genre: Hard rock
- Length: 41:16
- Label: PGP-RTB
- Producer: Kornelije Kovač

Riblja Čorba chronology
Riblja Čorba 10 (1988)	Priča o ljubavi obično ugnjavi (1988)	Koza nostra (1990)

Priča o ljubavi obično ugnjavi (trans. A Love Story Is Usually Annoying) is the ninth studio album from Serbian and former Yugoslav rock band Riblja Čorba, released in 1988.

With the release of the album, the band celebrated ten years of existence. The songs generally did not deal with politics (for what Riblja Čorba was well-known). The songs "Avionu slomiću ti krila", "Kaži, ko te ljubi dok sam ja na straži", and "Još jedna cigareta pre spavanja" were the album's biggest hits.

== Album cover ==
The album cover was designed by Jugoslav Vlahović.

== Track listing ==
No.	Title	Lyrics	Music	Length
1.	"Oko mene" ("Around Me")	B. Đorđević	N. Čuturilo, B. Đorđević	3:49
2.	"Prošlosti (Nisi bila bogzna šta)" ("Hey, Past (You Weren't Really Much at All)")	B. Đorđević	B. Đorđević	4:40
3.	"Znam te (Drugoga voli)" ("I Know You (Love Someone Else)")	B. Đorđević	V. Božinović	4:12
4.	"Kaži, ko te ljubi dok sam ja na straži" ("Tell Me, Who's Kissing You While I'm on Guard")	B. Đorđević	M. Aleksić, B. Đorđević	4:35
5.	"Još jedna cigareta pre spavanja" ("Another Cigarette Before Bedtime")	B. Đorđević	B. Đorđević	3:29
6.	"Avionu slomiću ti krila" ("Airplane, I'll Break Your Wings")	B. Đorđević	B. Đorđević	3:42
7.	"Napolju" ("Outside")	B. Đorđević	B. Đorđević	4:52
8.	"Ljudi" ("People")	B. Đorđević	M. Milatović	3:55
9.	"Lupa bubanj, zveči zvečka" ("Drum Is Banging, Rattle Is Tanging")	B. Đorđević	B. Đorđević	3:19
10.	"Celu noć te sanjam" ("I'm Dreaming of You all Night")	B. Đorđević	M. Aleksić	4:58

== Personnel ==
- Bora Đorđević - vocals
- Vidoja Božinović - guitar
- Nikola Čuturilo - guitar
- Vicko Milatović - drums
- Miša Aleksić - bass guitar

=== Additional personnel ===
- Kornelije Kovač - keyboards, producer
- Aleksandra Kovač - backing vocals (on "Još jedna cigareta pre spavanja")
- Kristina Kovač - backing vocals (on "Još jedna cigareta pre spavanja")
- Vlada Negovanović - recorded by
