= Koncert za brigadire =

Live album by Riblja Čorba
- Released: 2011
- Recorded: September 29, 1985
- Genre: Hard rock
- Label: RTV Stara Pazova

Riblja Čorba chronology
Niko nema ovakve ljude! (2010)	Koncert za brigadire (2011)	Uzbuna! (2012)

Professional ratings
Review scores
Source	Rating
Popboks	7/10 stars
Time Machine Music	(favorable)

Koncert za brigadire (trans. Concert for the Brigadiers) is the seventh live album from Serbian rock Riblja Čorba, released in 2011.

The album features a recording of the band's performance on the 1985 youth work action Đerdap 1985. The album was released through RTV Stara Pazova, on CD, and, in a limited number of 1000 copies, on vinyl record.

== Track listing ==
No.	Title	Length
1.	"Draga, ne budi peder"	4:58
2.	"Dvorska budala"	2:53
3.	"Hleba i igara"	2:27
4.	"'Alo"	2:45
5.	"Volim, volim, volim, volim žene"	3:13
6.	"Neću da ispadnem životinja"	4:16
7.	"Evo ti za taxi"	2:39
8.	"Prevara"	3:02
9.	"Odlazak u grad"	2:21
10.	"Ostaću slobodan"	4:55
11.	"Kad hodaš"	4:13
12.	"Kako je lepo biti glup"	2:30
13.	"Pogledaj dom svoj, anđele"	6:35
14.	"Vetar duva, duva, duva"	1:04

== Personnel ==
- Bora Đorđević - vocals
- Vidoja Božinović - guitar
- Nikola Čuturilo - guitar
- Miša Aleksić - bass guitar
- Miroslav Milatović - drums

=== Additional personnel ===
- Vuk Popadić - design
