= Uzbuna! =

Studio album by Riblja Čorba
- Released: November 15, 2012
- Recorded: Studio O, Belgrade, 2012
- Genre: Hard rock
- Labels: Fidbox (Vinyl record); City Records (CD)
- Producer: John McCoy

Riblja Čorba chronology
Koncert za brigadire (2011)	Uzbuna! (2012)	Da tebe nije (2019)

Professional ratings
Review scores
Source	Rating
Balkanrock.com	2/5 stars
nadlanu.com	(favorable)
Muzika.hr	2.5/5 stars
Nocturne	8/10 stars
Zli Hadžo	2/5 stars

Uzbuna! (trans. Alarm!) is the nineteenth studio album from Serbian rock band Riblja Čorba, released in 2012.

== Recording and release ==
The album was recorded in Studio O in Belgrade, and produced by John McCoy, who produced the band's albums Mrtva priroda (1981), Buvlja pijaca (1982) and Istina (1985), and with whom the band cooperated again after 27 years. It was mastered in Abbey Road Studios by Peter Mew.

The album cover was designed by Jugoslav and Jakša Vlahović, and refers to the cover of the band's album Mrtva priroda. In an interview for Večernje novosti, the band's frontman Bora Đorđević stated that the "cyber version of the chicken from Mrtva priroda" symbolizes "fight against new technologies" which "devalue every art form".

The album was released on both compact disc and vinyl, being the band's first album released on vinyl after twenty years.

== Track listing ==
No.	Title	Lyrics	Music	Length
1.	"Uzbuna" ("Alarm")	B. Đorđević	B. Đorđević	3:19
2.	"Monetarni udar" ("Monetary Shock")	B. Đorđević	M. Milatović, R. Kojić	3:42
3.	"Užasno mi nedostaje" ("I Miss Her so Much")	B. Đorđević	B. Đorđević, V. Božinović	5:34
4.	"Lelek Serba" ("Serbs' Lament")	B. Đorđević	D. A. Robles	3:47
5.	"Malograđanska" ("Petit Bourgeois Song")	B. Đorđević	M. Milatović	4:41
6.	"Kad neko ljubav urekne" ("When Someone Puts a Spell on Love")	B. Đorđević	M. Aleksić	3:54
7.	"Od čega ću bre da umrem" ("What Will I Die Of")	B. Đorđević	B. Đorđević	3:49
8.	"Ti ne znaš šta ćeš da budeš kad porasteš" ("You Don't Know What You're Gonna Be When You Grow Up")	B. Đorđević	B. Đorđević	5:08
9.	"Kad me već lažeš (Izgubljen)" ("Now That You're Lying To Me (Lost)")	B. Đorđević	N. Zorić	4:21
10.	"Šerše la fam" ("Cherchez la Femme")	B. Đorđević	B. Đorđević	2:52
11.	"Biće bolje kad prenoći (Od nemila do nedraga)" ("It Will Be Better When I Sleep Over It (From Pillar to Post)")	B. Đorđević	V. Božinović	4:08
12.	"Sam sam pao, sam se i ubio" ("I Got No One to Blame but Myself")	B. Đorđević	V. Božinović	4:34

== Personnel ==
- Bora Đorđević - vocals
- Vidoja Božinović - guitar, backing vocals
- Miša Aleksić - bass guitar, backing vocals
- Vicko Milatović - drums, backing vocals
- Nikola Zorić - keyboards, backing vocals, engineer

=== Additional personnel ===
- John McCoy - producer, bass guitar (on track 5), backing vocals
- Sava Ristić - harmonica (on track 10)
- Gane Pecikoza - backing vocals
- Goran Jović - backing vocals
- Milan Popović - backing vocals
- Miljko Radonjić - backing vocals
- Slobodan Marković - backing vocals
- Oliver Jovanović - engineer
- Peter Mew - mastered by
- Jugoslav Vlahović - cover art, photography
- Jakša Vlahović - cover art, photography
