= Niko nema ovakve ljude! =

2010 live/video album by Riblja Čorba

Live album by Riblja Čorba
- Released: 2010
- Recorded: Belgrade Arena, Belgrade; October 31, 2009
- Genre: Hard rock
- Label: City Records

Riblja Čorba chronology
Minut sa njom (2009)	Niko nema ovakve ljude! (2010)	Koncert za brigadire (2012)

Niko nema ovakve ljude!

Video by Riblja Čorba
- Released: 2010
- Recorded: Belgrade Arena, Belgrade; October 31, 2009
- Genres: Rock; Hard rock
- Label: City Records
- Director: Nebojša Radosavljević

Riblja Čorba chronology
Gladijatori u BG Areni (2008)	Niko nema ovakve ljude! (2010)

Professional ratings
Review scores
Source	Rating
Mikrofonija	(favorable)

Niko nema ovakve ljude! (trans. No One Has This Kind of People!) is the live/video album by Serbian rock band Riblja Čorba, released in 2010. The album was recorded on the band's concert held on October 31, 2009 in Belgrade Arena. The album featured two CDs and one DVD with the recording of the concert.

== Track listing ==
=== CDs ===
==== Disc 1 ====
1. "Ravnodušan prema plaču"
2. "Radiću šta god hoću"
3. "Nojeva barka"
4. "Srbin je lud"
5. "Jedino moje"
6. "Poslednja pesma o tebi"
7. "Minut sa njom"
8. "Rock 'n' roll za kućni savet"
9. "Nemoj da ideš mojom ulicom"
10. "Volim, volim, volim, žene"
11. "Vetar duva, duva, duva"
12. "Dva dinara, druže"
13. "Nemoj, srećo, nemoj danas"
14. "Muško od plastelina"
15. "Rekla je"
16. "Al Kapone"

==== Disc 2 ====
1. "Avionu, slomiću ti krila"
2. "Amsterdam"
3. "Krilati pegazi"
4. "Ostaću slobodan"
5. "Gde si u ovom glupom hotelu"
6. "Kad padne noć (Upomoć)"
7. "Pogledaj dom svoj, anđele"
8. "Bože, koliko je volim"
9. "Kad sam bio mlad"
10. "Ostani đubre do kraja"
11. "Lutka sa naslovne strane"
12. "Odlazim"
13. "Ljubav ovde više ne stanuje"
14. "Dobro jutro"

=== DVD ===
1. "Ravnodušan prema plaču"
2. "Radiću šta god hoću"
3. "Nojeva barka"
4. "Srbin je lud"
5. "Jedino moje"
6. "Poslednja pesma o tebi"
7. "Minut sa njom"
8. "Rock 'n' roll za kućni savet"
9. "Nemoj da ideš mojom ulicom"
10. "Volim, volim, volim, žene"
11. "Vetar duva, duva, duva"
12. "Dva dinara, druže"
13. "Nemoj, srećo, nemoj danas"
14. "Muško od plastelina"
15. "Rekla je"
16. "Al Kapone"
17. "Avionu, slomiću ti krila"
18. "Amsterdam"
19. "Krilati pegazi"
20. "Ostaću slobodan"
21. "Gde si u ovom glupom hotelu"
22. "Kad padne noć (Upomoć)"
23. "Pogledaj dom svoj, anđele"
24. "Bože, koliko je volim"
25. "Kad sam bio mlad"
26. "Ostani đubre do kraja"
27. "Lutka sa naslovne strane"
28. "Odlazim"
29. "Ljubav ovde više ne stanuje"
30. "Dobro jutro"

== Personnel ==
- Bora Đorđević - vocals
- Vidoja Božinović - guitar
- Miša Aleksić - bass guitar
- Miroslav Milatović - drums
- Nikola Zorić - keyboards, editor

=== Additional personnel ===
- Dajana Ivin - backing vocals
- Dubravka Petrović - backing vocals
- Dušan Zrnić - backing vocals
- Nebojša Radosavljević - director (video)
- Boris Jovanović - engineer
- Boris Krstajić - engineer
- Dejan Škopelja - engineer
- Nemanja Novaković - editor (video)
