= Vojkan Borisavljević =

Serbian composer and conductor (1947–2021)

Vojkan Borisavljević Војкан Борисављевић
- Birth name: Војислав Борисављевић
- Born: May 5, 1947; Zrenjanin, Vojvodina, PR Serbia, Yugoslavia
- Died: February 23, 2021 (aged 73); Belgrade, Serbia

Vojislav "Vojkan" Borisavljević (5 May 1947 – 23 February 2021) was a Serbian composer and conductor. He composed more than five hundred songs for the most famous Yugoslav singers - Leo Martin, Zdravko Čolić, Đorđe Marjanović, Miki Jevremović, and many others, as well as for numerous television series and films, such as the series Gray Home and Hot Wind, and the film Barking at the Stars, for whose music he was awarded the Golden Mimosa at the Yugoslav Film Festival in Herceg Novi in 1997.

Borisavljević was born in Zrenjanin. He was the author of the songs "Odyssey", "Love is just a word", "And now goodbye, I love you". He died in Belgrade, aged 73.
