= Nema laži, nema prevare – Uživo, Zagreb '85 =

Nema laži, nema prevare – Zagreb uživo '85

Live album by Riblja Čorba
- Released: August 14, 1995
- Recorded: March 3, 1985
- Venues: Kulušić (Zagreb, SR Croatia, SFR Yugoslavia)
- Genre: Hard rock
- Length: 44:11
- Label: Biveco

Riblja Čorba chronology
Zbogom, Srbijo (1993)	Nema laži, nema prevare – Zagreb uživo '85 (1995)	Ostalo je ćutanje (1996)

Nema laži, nema prevare – Uživo, Zagreb '85 (trans. No Lies, No Frauds – Live, Zagreb '85) is the second live album by former Yugoslav and Serbian rock band Riblja Čorba.

Originally a bootleg recording of Riblja Čorba concert held in Zagreb on March 3, 1985, Nema laži, nema prevare – Zagreb uživo '85 was released as a live album in 1995 by Slovenian record label Biveco.

The recording was not remastered, or edited in any other way for the release. The band has included the album into their official discography.

In 2021, Biveco released a remastered CD of the album alongside an LP version of the album with a different cover and a shortened tracklist which became a collectors' item.

== Track listing ==
No.	Title	Length
1.	"Draga, ne budi peder" ("Darling, Don't be a Faggot")	4:17
2.	"Dvorska budala" ("Jester")	3:29
3.	"Rock 'n' Roll za kućni savet" ("Rock 'n' Roll for the Residents' Committee")	4:16
4.	"Neću da ispadnem životinja" ("I Don't Want to Look Like an Animal")	4:40
5.	"Dva dinara, druže" ("Two Dinars, Comrade")	4:34
6.	"Evo ti za taksi" ("Here's Some for the Cab")	2:47
7.	"Egoista" ("Egoist")	2:48
8.	"Hleba i igara" ("Bread and Circuses")	3:03
9.	"'Alo" ("Hello")	3:06
10.	"Prevara" ("Betrayal")	4:28
11.	"Kad hodaš" ("When You Walk")	4:53
12.	"Sačekaj" ("Wait")	3:38
13.	"Kako je lepo biti glup" ("How Nice it is to be Stupid")	4:21
14.	"Džindžer solo" ("Ginger Solo")	3:24
15.	"'Ajde beži" ("Go Away")	4:12
16.	"Odlazak u grad" ("Leaving For the City")	2:16
17.	"Ostaću slobodan" ("I'll Stay Free")	2:17
18.	"Volim, volim, volim, volim žene" ("I Love, Love, Love, Love Women")	2:47
19.	"Neću da te volim" ("I Don't Wanna Love You")	4:14
20.	"Priča o Žiki Živcu" ("The Story of Žika the Nerve")	3:24

== Personnel ==
- Bora Đorđević - vocals
- Vidoja Božinović - guitar
- Nikola Čuturilo - guitar
- Miša Aleksić - bass guitar
- Vicko Milatović - drums
