= Ostalo je ćutanje =

Studio album by Riblja Čorba
- Released: May 2, 1996
- Recorded: February – April 1996
- Studio: Studio Pink, Zemun, Belgrade
- Genre: Hard rock
- Length: 39:10
- Label: Western Music
- Producer: Milan Popović; Miša Aleksić; Vlada Barjaktarević

Riblja Čorba chronology
Nema laži, nema prevare – Uživo, Zagreb '85 (1995)	Ostalo je ćutanje (1996)	Od Vardara pa do Triglava (1996)

Ostalo je ćutanje (Serbian Cyrillic: Остало је ћутање, lit. 'Silence Remains') is the thirteenth studio album from Serbian and former Yugoslav rock band Riblja Čorba.

Apart from its title, the album contains several more references to William Shakespeare's Hamlet: album features a track entitled "Nešto je trulo u državi Danskoj" ("Something's Rotten in the State of Denmark", the song itself referring to Serbia), and the album cover features the band's frontman Bora Đorđević holding a skull.

Ostalo je ćutanje is the first album recorded with the band's first official keyboardist Vladimir Barjaktarević. It is also the last album recorded with guitarist Zoran Ilić. "Odlazi od mene, ubico, idi" features former female members of Đorđević's former band Suncokret, Snežana Jandrlić, Biljana Krstić and Gorica Popović, on vocals. The song is notable for being the only Riblja Čorba song which does not feature Bora Đorđević on lead vocals. "Gastarbajterska pesma" features a passage from "Užičko kolo" played on accordion by Legende member Dušan Suvajac. The track "Ljubomorko" is a cover of John Lennon's song "Jealous Guy".

== Album cover ==
The album cover was designed by Jugoslav Vlahović.

== Track listing ==
No.	Title	Lyrics	Music	Length
1.	"Džigi Bau Story (Priča o Džigi Bauu) (The Story of Dzigi Bau)"	B. Đorđević	M. Aleksić	4:28
2.	"Ljubomorko (Jealous Guy)"	B. Đorđević	J. Lennon	3:01
3.	"Nešto je trulo u državi Danskoj (Something Is Rotten In The Country Of Denmark)"	B. Đorđević	B. Đorđević	3:47
4.	"Gnjilane"	B. Đorđević	M. Matter	4:02
5.	"Majko (Mother)"	B. Đorđević	B. Đorđević	5:19
6.	"Gastarbajterska pesma (Guest Worker Song)"	B. Đorđević	B. Đorđević	3:57
7.	"Deca cveća (Flower Children)"	B. Đorđević	V. Božinović	5:20
8.	"Gluvi telefoni (Deaf Phones)"	B. Đorđević	B. Đorđević	3:22
9.	"Odlazi od mene, ubico, idi (Get Away From Me, Murderer, Go)"	B. Đorđević	B. Đorđević	2:42
10.	"Ostalo je ćutanje (Silence Has Stayed)"	B. Đorđević	B. Đorđević	4:11

== Personnel ==
- Bora Đorđević - vocals
- Vidoja Božinović - guitar
- Zoran Ilić - guitar
- Miša Aleksić - bass guitar, producer
- Vicko Milatović - drums
- Vladimir Barjaktarević - keyboards, producer, recorded by, programmed by

=== Additional personnel ===
- Marija Mihajlović - backing vocals
- Snežana Jandrlić - vocals (on "Odlazi od mene, ubico, idi")
- Gorica Popović - vocals (on "Odlazi od mene, ubico, idi")
- Biljana Krstić - vocals (on "Odlazi od mene, ubico, idi")
- Dušan Suvajac - accordion (on "Džigi Bau Story (Priča o Džigi Bauu)" and "Gastarbajterska pesma")
- Neša Petrović - saxophone (on "Džigi Bau Story (Priča o Džigi Bauu)")
- Miodrag Alabanda - violin (on "Džigi Bau Story (Priča o Džigi Bauu)")
- Milan Popović - producer
