= Trilogija 3: Ambasadori loše volje =

EP by Riblja Čorba
- Released: December 10, 2006
- Recorded: Studio O, December 2005 – March 2006
- Genre: Hard rock
- Length: 22:05
- Label: M Factory
- Producer: Milan Popović; Miša Aleksić

Riblja Čorba chronology
Trilogija 2: Devičanska ostrva (2006)	Trilogija 3: Ambasadori loše volje (2006)	Trilogija (2007)

Trilogija 3: Ambasadori loše volje (Serbian Cyrillic: Трилогија 3: Амбасадори лоше воље, trans. Trilogy 3: Badwill Ambassadors) is the third EP from Serbian and former Yugoslav rock band Riblja Čorba. It is the third and the final part of the Riblja Čorba trilogy released during 2005 and 2006. The band considers EPs Trilogija 1: Nevinost bez zaštite, Trilogija 2: Devičanska ostrva and Trilogija 3: Ambasadori loše volje three parts of the studio album titled Trilogija, although all three were released separately. All the songs from three EPs were released on the compilation album Trilogija.

Song Prezir is used in film Uslovna sloboda.

== Track listing ==
No.	Title	Lyrics	Music	Length
1.	"Sve i svja (Everything And Everything)"	B. Đorđević	V. Božinović, B. Đorđević	5:22
2.	"Usrana motka (Shitty Pole)"	B. Đorđević	M. Milatović	4:20
3.	"Ljudi ko ljudi (People As People)"	B. Đorđević	B. Đorđević	4:12
4.	"Pad (Fall)"	B. Đorđević	B. Đorđević	3:45
5.	"Prezir (Contempt)"	B. Đorđević	B. Đorđević	4:26

== Personnel ==
- Bora Đorđević - vocals
- Vidoja Božinović - guitar
- Miša Aleksić - bass guitar, co-producer
- Vicko Milatović - drums
- Nikola Zorić - keyboards, recorded by

=== Additional personnel ===
- Choir on "Prezir":
  - Biljana Krstić
  - Aleksandra Marković
  - Biljana Stresina
  - Marija Novović
  - Radovan Dikanović
  - Aleksandar Radulović
  - Andreja Rackov
  - Uroš Bojanić
- Milan Popović - producer
- Oliver Jovanović - engineer, mixed by, mastered by
