= Warriors (band) =

Heavy metal band

- The first (Yugoslav) Warriors lineup

Background information
- Also known as: Ratnici
- Origin: Belgrade, SR Serbia, SFR Yugoslavia (1982-1983); Toronto, Canada (1983-1986)
- Genres: Heavy metal
- Years active: 1982–1986
- Labels: PGP-RTB, Attic
- Past members: Dušan Nikolić; Miroslav Milatović; Slobodan Svrdlan; Dragan Deletić; Zoran Konjević; Douglass Platt; Lawrence Gretsch

Warriors were a Yugoslav and later Canadian heavy metal band formed in Belgrade in 1982.

The band was formed under the name Ratnici (Serbo-Croatian for Warriors) by the vocalist Dušan Nikolić and Riblja Čorba drummer Miroslav "Vicko" Milatović, being Milatović's side project. They recorded their debut release, the EP Warriors – Ratnici, in 1983, after which Milatović left the band. Nikolić continued to lead the band, which released their debut self-titled album in Yugoslavia, before moving to Toronto, Canada. In Canada the band released their second self-titled album, disbanding in 1986.

== Band history ==
The band was formed in 1982 by vocalist Dušan Nikolić and drummer Miroslav "Vicko" Milatović and was originally named Ratnici (Serbo-Croatian for Warriors). Milatović was at the time a member of highly successful band Riblja Čorba, Ratnici being his side project. The first lineup of the band also featured guitarist Dragan Deletić, guitarist Zoran Konjević and bass guitarist Slobodan Svrdlan (a former member of the band Gordi).

In 1983, the band released their debut EP entitled Warriors – Ratnici, with four songs, two of them with English and two with Serbo-Croatian language lyrics, through Yugoslav record label PGP-RTB. After the EP release, Milatović had to leave the band due to his mandatory stint in the Yugoslav People's Army, and Canadian guitarist Douglass Platt replaced Deletić. In 1983, the band released their first self-titled album through PGP-RTB with Tom Martin (a former member of the band Izazov) on drums, however, not as an official band member.

After the release of their debut album, Warriors moved to Toronto and signed for Canadian record label Attic Records. In 1984, with Canadian drummer Lawrence Gretsch (formerly of Frank Soda & The Imps) as the new member, the band recorded their second self-titled album. After the album release, the band went on a short tour with Nazareth, disbanding shortly after.

=== Post breakup ===
Slobodan Svrdlan was a member of American band Lost City, recording the album Watching You (1993) with them, and British band Michael Aston's Gene Loves Jezebel, recording the album Love Lies Bleeding (1999) with them. Gretsch was, for a period of time, a member of Canadian band The Carpet Frogs.

In 2019, Dušan Nikolić, under the moniker Warrior Angel, released the concept album Griffin 1.29 Chapter 1, dedicated to his late wife Christine Catherine Griffin. The album was followed by album Griffin 1.29 Chapter 2, released in 2020. He died in Canada on 10 November 2022.

== Discography ==
=== Studio albums ===
- Warriors (1983)
- Warriors (1984)

=== EPs ===
- Warriors – Ratnici (1983)
