= Alisa (Serbian band) =

Serbian-Yugoslav pop rock band

- Alisa in 1987

Background information
- Origin: Belgrade, Serbia
- Genres: Pop rock; power pop; folk rock
- Years active: 1984–1991; 2001–2002; 2018–2024
- Labels: Jugodisk, PGP-RTB, Raglas Records, PGP-RTS
- Past members: Miroslav Živanović; Zoran Jančeski; Marko Glavan; Predrag Cvetković; Aleksandar Kićanović; Saša Gnus; Dušan Karadžić; Zoran Petrović; Bojan Mišković; Dejan Resanović; Predrag Stojković; Miloš Đurić

Alisa (Serbian Cyrillic: Алиса; Slavic analogue to the female name Alice) was a Serbian and Yugoslav pop rock band formed in Belgrade in 1984.

Formed and led by vocalist Miroslav "Pile" Živanović, Alisa gained nationwide popularity in the mid-1980s with their debut self-titled album. All the songs on the band's debut were authored by keyboardist Jovan Stojiljković, who was an unofficial member of the group. Alisa's following three studio albums, also featuring songs authored by Stoiljković, brought a number of hits. Alisa disbanded with the outbreak of Yugoslav Wars in 1991, and reunited at the beginning of 2000s, releasing one studio album before another disbandment. Alisa reunited in the original lineup in 2018, releasing new material. The band's activity ended with the death of their frontman Miroslav Živanović at the beginning of 2024.

== Band history ==
=== 1984–1991 ===
The members Alisa's first lineup were active on the Belgrade rock scene for a number of years before managing to achieve breakthrough. Alisa frontman Miroslav "Pile" Živanović started his career as the vocalist for the band Zvučni Zid (Sound Barrier). He later moved to the heavy metal band Jedan smer (One Direction) and eventually formed the band Sedmi Krug (Seventh Circle). In 1984, he formed Alisa with his Sedmi Krug bandmate Zoran Jančeski (guitar), former BG5 member Marko Glavan (bass guitar), former member of Slađana Milošević's backing band Ljudi (People) Predrag Cvetković (drums) and Aleksandar Kićanović (keyboards).

The band released their debut self-titled album in 1985. All the songs were written by keyboardist Jovan Stojiljković, former leader of Živanović's former band Zvučni Zid. Stojiljković wrote some of the songs recorded for the album during the 1970s, while he was leading the band Bicikl (Bicycle). He opted not to become an official member of Alisa, but to continue his cooperation with the band as a songwriter, authoring their fairy tales-inspired songs. The album featured guest appearance by former BG5 member Saša Gnus on flute and saxophone, and the album cover was designed by cartoonist and designer Jugoslav Vlahović. Although poorly produced, the album brought hits "Sanja" and "Vojskovođa" ("Warlord"). Owing to them Alisa gained a large number of fans, especially in SR Serbia and SR Bosnia and Herzegovina, where they became teen stars. After the album release, Gnus became an official member of the band.

With their second album, Da li si čula pesmu umornih slavuja (Have You Heard the Song of Tired Nightingales), released in 1987 and heavily influenced by the Sarajevo scene of bands which performed folk-influenced pop rock, the band made an attempt to gain more mature audience. Once again, the songs were written by Stojiljković. The album featured new bass guitarist Dušan Karadžić and was produced by Saša Habić. It featured guest appearances by keyboardist Laza Ristovski, Milovan Babić Trumpet Orchestra, gusle player Jova Vujičić (in the song "1389.", which was inspired by Serbian epic poems about the Battle of Kosovo) and folk singer Lepa Brena. Lepa Brena appeared in the song "Posle devet godina" ("After Nine Years"), originally not intended to be a duet. At the time of the album recording, she was visiting the studio, and, after hearing the song, expressed her desire to sing it with Živanović. "Posle devet godina" and "1389." would become the album's biggest hits. The album also featured a new version of the band's old hit "Vojskovođa".

Alisa's third album, Hiljadu tona ljubavi (Thousand Tons of Love), released in 1988 and also produced by Habić, featured similar folk influenced-pop rock sound. For the first time, Živanović wrote part of the songs, including the album's biggest hit, "Kesteni" ("Chestnut Trees"). The song "Sećanje na juli" ("Memory of July") featured a musical quotation from Đorđe Marjanović's hit "Romana". The band's fourth studio album, entitled Glupo je spavati dok svira Rock 'n' Roll (It's Dumb to Sleep while Rock 'n' Roll Is Playing) and released in 1989, featured new guitarist Zoran Petrović. The album was produced by Vlada Negovanović. After a series of promotional shows, Alisa disbanded with the outbreak of Yugoslav Wars.

Simultaneously with performing with Alisa, Karadžić recorded the 1989 album Kralj ulice (King of the Streat) with the band Gerila (Guerrilla). In 1996, Raglas Records released Alisa compilation album entitled Zlatna kolekcija (Golden Collection).

=== 2001–2002 ===
Živanović and Cvetković reformed Alisa in 2001. The new lineup featured, beside Živanović on vocals and Cvetković on drums, Bojan Mišković (guitar), Dejan Resanović (bass guitar), Predrag Stojković (keyboards) and Miloš Đurić (percussion). They released their comeback album, entitled simply Alisa, in 2001. Besides new songs, the album featured new versions of the band's old hits. The band released an animated video for the song "Boško Buha", with the title and lyrics inspired by World War II Partisan hero Boško Buha. However, the video was soon taken down from Serbian TV stations due to the assassination of the chief of Belgrade city police also named Boško Buha.

Alisa disbanded once again shortly after the album release, Živanović forming the band Vožd. He also played bass guitar in the band Krug Dvojke (Circle of the Tram number Two, the name being a popular expression for the central parts of Belgrade), recording the album Krug dvojke (2004) with them. Most of the songs for the album were written by Jovan Stojiljković.

=== 2018–2024 ===
In 2018, Alisa reunited in the original lineup: Miroslav "Pile" Živanović (vocals), Predrag Cvetković (drums), Zoran Jančeski (who had in the meantime performed with his band Konak, guitar), Marko Glavan (bass guitar) and Aleksandar Kićanović (keyboards). In December 2018, the band released their comeback single "Pijane noći" ("Drunken Nights"), with lyrics written by the band's old associate Jovan Stoiljković and music written by Goran Vranić, but the comeback concerts were postponed due to the outbreak of COVID-19 pandemic in Serbia. In 2022, the band released the double compilation album Najbolje iz zemlje čuda (Best from Wonderland), featuring their old hits, as well as "Pijane noći" and the new version of their old song "Blago onom ko te ne sanja". On 17 December 2022, the band held a concert in Belgrade Youth Center in order to celebrate their 35th anniversary, choosing the Center for the anniversary concert because they had their first live performance in the venue. On 6 January 2024, Miroslav Živanović died in Belgrade. On 14 December 2024, the rest of the band members, with several guest musicians, held a tribute concert to Živanović in Belgrade Youth Center.

== Discography ==
=== Studio albums ===
- Alisa (1985)
- Da li si čula pesmu umornih slavuja (1987)
- Hiljadu tona ljubavi (1988)
- Glupo je spavati dok svira Rock 'n' Roll (1989)
- Alisa (2001)

=== Compilation albums ===
- Zlatna kolekcija (1996)
- Najbolje iz zemlje čuda (2022)

=== Singles ===
- Pijane noći (2018)
- Blago onom ko te ne sanja (2020)
