= Željko Savić =

Bosnian Serb footballer

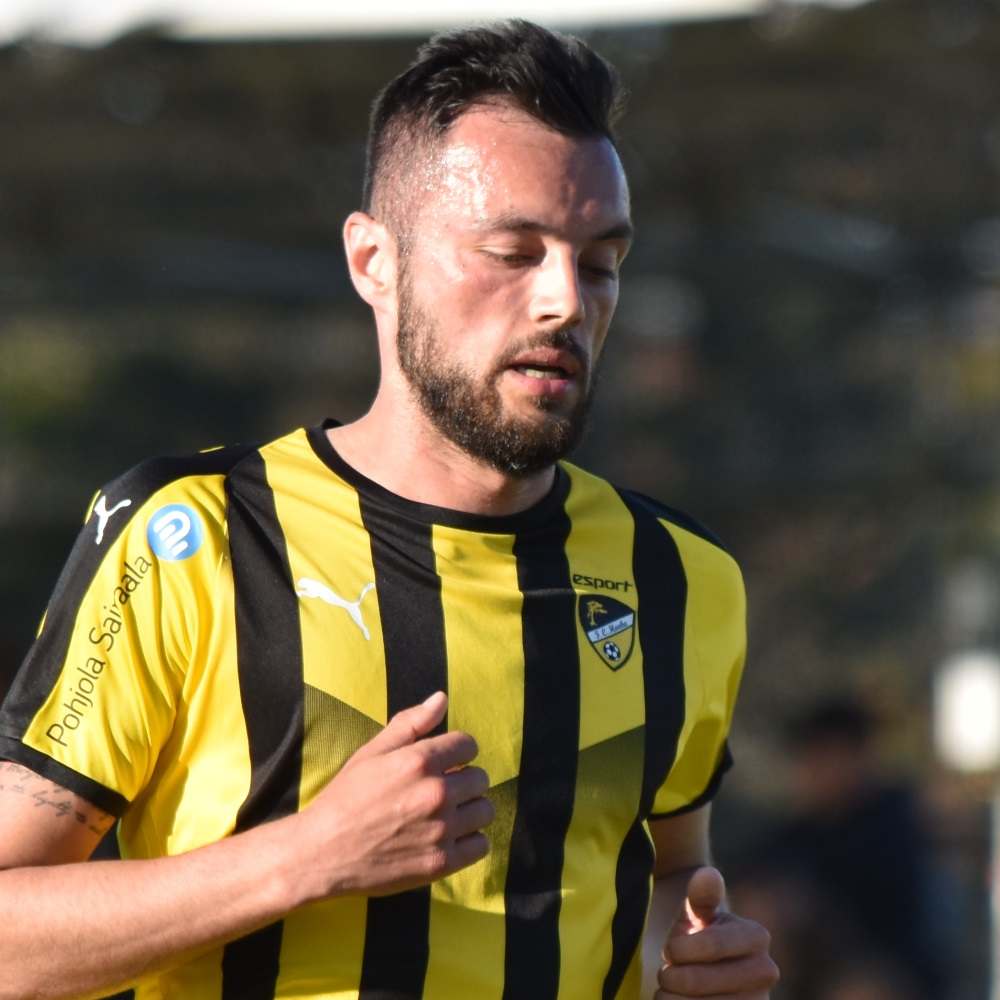

Personal information
- Date of birth: 18 March 1988 (age 38)
- Place of birth: Bihać, SFR Yugoslavia
- Height: 1.87 m (6 ft 1 1/2 in)
- Position: Centre-back

Senior career*
Years	Team	Apps	(Gls)
2006–2012	Omladinac Novi Banovci		
2012–2014	Inđija	24	(0)
2014–2016	SJK	63	(1)
2016–2017	PS Kemi	31	(1)
2017	DPMM FC	6	(0)
2018	FC Honka	3	(0)
2018	TPS	10	(0)
2019–2022	Omladinac Novi Banovci		
2023	Sloven Ruma		
- * Club domestic league appearances and goals as of 1 May 2023

Željko Savić (Serbian Cyrillic: Жељко Савић; born 18 March 1988) is a Bosnian Serb retired football defender.

== Club career ==
Born in Bihać, SR Bosnia and Herzegovina, back then still within SFR Yugoslavia, Savic started playing in Serbia with lower-league side FK Omladinac Novi Banovci. In 2012, he moved to Inđija playing in second level, Serbian First League.

Joining Bruneian club DPMM for the 2017 S.League season in 2017 via Trebol Sports International, Savic was impressed with his teammates efforts during practice and was surprised by the leagues different playing style, saying that they liked pushing forward. Settling well into the team, the defender formed a salubrious relationship with his teammates, making his debut in a 2–0 win over Hougang United, their first victory of the season. However, he let slip 4 goals and was substituted before half-time when Home United beat DPMM 9–3 on May 25, 2017, which proved to be his last game for the Bruneian outfit.

In February 2023, he transferred to Sloven of the Vojvodina League South.
