= Zoran Ilić =

Serbian-Hungarian handball player (born 2002)

Zoran Ilic
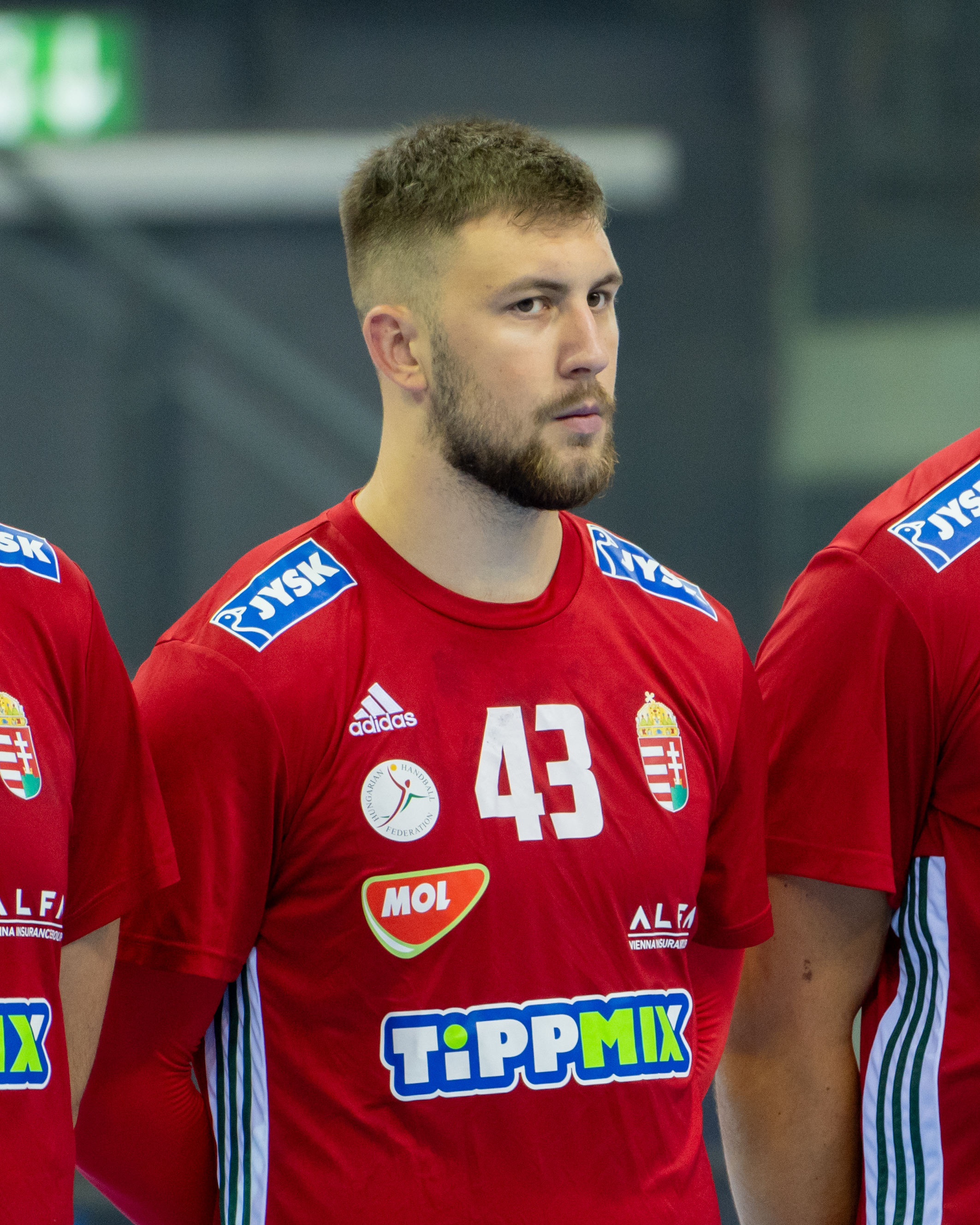

Personal information
- Nationality: Serbian / Hungarian
- Born: 2 January 2002 (age 24) Senta, Serbia, FR Yugoslavia
- Height: 1.97 m (6 ft 6 in)

Sport
- Sport: Handball
- Position: Right back
- Current club: Wisła Płock
- Number: 43

Youth career
- Years: Team
- 2016–2017: NEKA

Senior clubs
- Years: Team
- 2017–2019: NEKA
- 2019–2023: Telekom Veszprém
- 2020: → Wisła Płock (loan)
- 2020–2021: → BFKA-Veszprém (loan)
- 2023–2025: HSV Hamburg
- 2025–: Wisła Płock
National team
Years	Team	Apps	(Gls)
2020–	Hungary	62	(119)
Medal record
Junior World Championship
Silver medal – second place	2023 Germany/Greece

Zoran Ilic (Serbian: Зоран Илић, romanized: Zoran Ilić; Hungarian: Ilics Zorán; born 2 Januar 2002) is a Serbian-born Hungarian handball player for Wisła Płock and for the Hungary national team.

== Career ==
=== Club ===
Ilić moved from Serbia to Hungary as a teenager, and started his career at NEKA. He made his debut in the first team in 2018, and in that season he scored 4 goals in 9 matches in the then still Nemzeti Bajnokság I/B team. In 2019, the Hungarian record champion moved to Telekom Veszprém, where he initially played in the second team, but was able to play 5 matches in the first team, in the Nemzeti Bajnokság I, in which he scored 2 goals. He also made his debut in the EHF Champions League (his coach and mentor at the club, Momir Ilić, has a similar background but is not a relative). In the fall of 2020, Veszprém loaned Ilić to Polish team Wisła Płock, but after three months he decided to return to Hungary and finish his studies. He scored 21 goals in six matches in the Polish Superliga, and 11 goals in 3 matches in the Champions League for Wisła. In the 2021/22 season, he participated in the BL Final 4 in Cologne, where he also scored a goal in the bronze medal match. At the end of the 2022/23 season, he became champion and cup winner with Veszprém, after which he left for the German team HSV Hamburg. He had scored 80 goals in 44 first-class matches for Veszprém, and 17 goals in 27 matches in the EHF Champions League. In December 2024, it was announced that Zoran would transfer to the Polish team Wisła Płock for 3 years from July 2025.

=== National team ===
He made his debut in the Hungary men's national handball team on 4 November 2020, in a Eurocup match against the Spain men's national handball team; Hungary won 32–29 but he did not score in the match. He was 9th with the Hungarian team at the 2021 Youth European Championship. He was included in the extended squad of the 2021 World Men's Handball Championship, but in the end he did not become a member of the reduced squad. As a member of the junior national team, he participated in the 2022 Junior European Championship where the Hungarian team finished 5th. He was included in the extended squad for the 2022 European Men's Handball Championship, but again did not make the cut for the reduced squad. He also participated in the 2023 World Men's Handball Championship as a member of the Hungary team (8th place, 9 matches / 10 goals). He participated in the 2023 Junior World Championship, where he was voted the best right back and Hungary won the silver medal. He also participated in the 2024 European Men's Handball Championship (5th place, 8 matches / 7 goals) followed by the 2024 Paris Olympics where the Hungarian team finished 10th (5 matches / 9 goals). He also participated in the 2025 World Men's Handball Championship as a member of the Hungary men's national handball team. (8th place, 7 matches / 26 goals). He also participated in the 2026 European Men's Handball Championship as a member of the Hungary men's national handball team. (10th place, 7 games / 21 goals).

== Honours ==
=== National team ===
- Junior World Championship:
  - Silver: 2023

=== Club ===
BFKA-Veszprém

- Nemzeti Bajnokság I/B
  - Silver: 2021

Telekom Veszprém

- Nemzeti Bajnokság I:
  - Gold: 2023
  - Silver: 2021, 2022
- Magyar Kupa:
  - Gold: 2021, 2022, 2023
- SEHA League
  - Gold: 2021, 2022

Wisła Płock

- Polish Superliga:
  - Silver: 2026
- Polish Cup
  - Gold: 2026
- Polish Supercup
  - Gold: 2026
  - Silver: 2025

=== Individual ===
- All-Star Right Back of the Junior World Championship: 2023
- Hungarian Youth Handball Player of the Year: 2022, 2023
