= Hi-Fi Centar =

- Founded: 1993
- Status: Defunct since 2005
- Genre: Various
- Country of origin: Serbia
- Location: Belgrade

Hi-Fi Centar was a record label based in Belgrade, Serbia.

The company was originally formed in 1987 as a music store and was originally named Audio Klub Centar. In 1993 it changed the name to Hi-Fi Centar and moved to record publishing. During the 1990s it reissued albums by Atheist Rap, Bijelo Dugme, Parni Valjak, Prljavo Kazalište, YU Grupa, and others, and during the late 1990s and early 2000s it released albums by the top acts of the Serbian rock scene, such as Đorđe Balašević, Neverne Bebe, Partibrejkers, Riblja Čorba, Van Gogh, and others.

== Artists ==
Some of the artist that have been signed to Hi-Fi Centar include:

- Azra
- Atheist Rap
- Bajaga i Instruktori
- Bijelo Dugme
- Branimir Štulić
- Đorđe Balašević
- Hari Mata Hari
- Bilja Krstić & Bistrik Orchestra
- Madame Piano
- Neverne Bebe
- Partibrejkers
- Riblja Čorba
- Van Gogh

== See also ==
- List of record labels
