= Istina =

Studio album by Riblja Čorba
- Released: March 27, 1985
- Recorded: January – February 1985
- Studio: Aquarius Studio, Belgrade
- Genre: Hard rock; heavy metal
- Length: 31:48
- Label: PGP-RTB
- Producer: John McCoy

Riblja Čorba chronology
Večeras vas zabavljaju muzičari koji piju (1984)	Istina (1985)	Osmi nervni slom (1986)

Istina (Serbian Cyrillic: Истина; trans. The Truth) is the sixth studio album released by Serbian and former Yugoslav rock band Riblja Čorba.

The album is considered by fans and critics alike to be one of Riblja Čorba's finest works, as well as the band's triumphant comeback after the unsuccessful album Večeras vas zabavljaju muzičari koji piju. Istina is also significant as the band's first album recorded with guitarists Vidoja Božinović and Nikola Čuturilo, the two joining the band after the departure of Rajko Kojić and Momčilo Bajagić.

The album was polled in 1998 as the 43rd on the list of 100 greatest Yugoslav rock and pop albums in the book YU 100: najbolji albumi jugoslovenske rok i pop muzike (YU 100: The Best albums of Yugoslav pop and rock music).

== Background ==
The album was recorded during the winter 1984–1985. It was recorded by Goran Vejvoda and produced by John McCoy.

After Riblja Čorba's record label Jugoton refused to release the songs "Snage opozicije", "Pogledaj dom svoj, anđele", "Alo", and "Dvorska budala" because of the provocative political-related lyrics, the band signed back with Jugoton's main competitor PGP-RTB. Nevertheless, the song "Snage opozicije" was not released on the album, and it only saw the light of day some thirteen years later on the 1997 compilation album Treći srpski ustanak.

The track "Disko mišić" featured Goran Bregović, leader of Riblja Čorba's main competitors at the time, Bijelo Dugme, on vocals (Đorđević previously made a guest appearance on Bijelo Dugme's 1984 self-titled album, singing with Bregović and Tifa in the song "Pediculis Pubis").

== Album cover ==
The cover art featured the band members' faces among the skulls on the historic Ćele kula. It was designed by cartoonist Jugoslav Vlahović.

== Track listing ==
No.	Title	Lyrics	Music	Length
1.	"Ajde beži" ("Go Away")	B. Đorđević	M. Aleksić	4:16
2.	"Neću da te volim" ("I Don't Wanna Love You")	B. Đorđević	M. Aleksić, N. Čuturilo	4:01
3.	"Hleba i igara" ("Bread and Circuses")	B. Đorđević	B. Đorđević	2:44
4.	"Sačekaj" ("Wait")	B. Đorđević	B. Đorđević	3:52
5.	"Alo" ("Hello")	B. Đorđević	M. Aleksić	2:58
6.	"Disko mišić" ("Disco Muscle")	B. Đorđević	M. Milatović, B. Đorđević	3:21
7.	"Verno pseto" ("Faithful Dog")	B. Đorđević	V. Božinović	4:05
8.	"Dvorska budala" ("Jester")	B. Đorđević	B. Đorđević	2:52
9.	"Pogledaj dom svoj, anđele" ("Look Homeward, Angel")	B. Đorđević	B. Đorđević	3:39

== Personnel ==
- Bora Đorđević - vocals
- Vidoja Božinović - guitar
- Nikola Čuturilo - guitar
- Miša Aleksić - bass guitar
- Vicko Milatović - drums

=== Guest musicians ===
- Goran Bregović - vocals (on "Disko mišić")
- Kornelije Kovač - keyboards

=== Additional personnel ===
- John McCoy - producer
- Goran Vejvoda - recorded by
- James Woodling - fairlight, mixing
- Ratko Ostojić - recorded by, mixed by

== Legacy ==
The album is perhaps most memorable for its apocalyptic track "Pogledaj dom svoj, anđele" (named after, but not inspired by the novel Look Homeward, Angel by Thomas Wolfe) which went on to become one of Riblja Čorba's signature pieces. It was voted Hit of the Year in 1985 by the listeners of Radio Beograd 202 and Song of the Decade in 1990. In 2009, the song was voted the Greatest Domestic Song by the readers of the Standard magazine. In 2000, the song was polled the first on the Rock Express Top 100 Yugoslav Rock Songs of All Times list.

The album was polled in 1998 as the 43rd on the list of 100 greatest Yugoslav rock and pop albums in the book YU 100: najbolji albumi jugoslovenske rok i pop muzike (YU 100: The Best albums of Yugoslav pop and rock music).

Istina was described by Serbian critic Petar Janjatović as "the first real comeback album in the history of Yugoslav rock". Serbian critic Dimitrije Vojnov named Istina one of ten most important albums in the history of Yugoslav rock music, stating also that Đorđević, "just like everyone who came back from the bottom, from rock coma, decided to become a preacher [...] 'Pogledaj dom svoj, anđele' would soon become much more than Čorba's comeback hit. It would become a political ideology, a soundtrack for pathos which announces the final clash, and the borders between rock 'n' roll provocation and reality, between Bora and the audience would be frozen and erased forever". Despite being more heavy metal-oriented than any of the band's previous albums, Istina is also the album after which the band, although generally still fitting into hard rock, started turning towards more commercial sound.

In 2015 Istina album cover was ranked the 2nd by web magazine Balkanrock on their list of 100 Greatest Album Covers of Yugoslav Rock.
