= Rock 'n' Roll za kućni savet =

1979 single by Riblja Čorba

"Rock'n'roll za kućni savet"

Single by Riblja Čorba
- B-side: "Valentino iz restorana"
- Released: April 24, 1979
- Recorded: 1979
- Genre: Hard rock
- Length: 2:41
- Label: PGP-RTB
- Songwriter: Bora Đorđević

Riblja Čorba singles chronology
"Lutka sa naslovne strane" (1978)	"Rock 'n' Roll za kućni savet" (1979)	"Nazad u veliki prljavi grad" (1980)

"Rock 'n' Roll za kućni savet" is a single from influential Serbian and former Yugoslav rock band Riblja Čorba from their 1979 album Kost u grlu.

B-side features the song "Valentino iz restorana".

== Track listing ==
1. "Rock 'n' Roll za kućni savet" - 2:41
2. "Valentino iz restorana" - 2:39

== Personnel ==
- Bora Đorđević - vocals
- Rajko Kojić - guitar
- Momčilo Bajagić - guitar
- Miša Aleksić - bass guitar
- Vicko Milatović - drums
