= Arsen & Bora Čorba Unplugged '87 =

Live album by Arsen Dedić and Bora Đorđević
- Released: 1987
- Recorded: Terazije Theatre, Belgrade; March 6, 1987
- Genre: Acoustic; Chanson; Rock; Hard rock
- Length: 63:13

Arsen Dedić chronology
Kino Sloboda (1987)	Arsen & Bora Čorba Unplugged '87 (1987)	Hrabri ljudi (1988)

Bora Đorđević chronology
Arsen & Bora Čorba Unplugged '87 (1987)	Bora priča gluposti (1988)

Arsen & Bora Čorba Unplugged '87 is the bootleg recording of the unplugged concert Croatian singer-songwriter Arsen Dedić and Serbian rock musician Bora Đorđević held in Terazije Theatre in Belgrade on March 6, 1987. The album is included in the official Bora Đorđević discography.

The album features Dedić's songs, the songs Đorđević recorded with his band Riblja Čorba, as well as both Dedić's and Đorđević's poems. The songs "Takvim sjajem može sjati" (originally performed by Dedić) and "Lutka sa naslovne strane" (originally performed by Riblja Čorba) are duets by Dedić and Đorđević.

The album features Stjepan Mihaljinec on piano and Riblja Čorba members Vidoja Božinović and Nikola Čuturilo on guitars. The album also features the actress Milena Dravić pronouncing the lyrics of Bulat Okudzhava's poem "Molitva". The concert was announced by the poet Ljubivoje Ršumović, however, this announcement is not featured on the album.

== Track listing ==
The performer is noted.

1. "Dobro jutro" (Đorđević) – 3:19
2. "Nježnost u mraku" (Dedić) – 2:46
3. "Bora Arsenu" (Đorđević) – 0:22
4. "Svete krave" (Dedić) – 2:12
5. "Zaboravlja se" (Dedić) – 3:16
6. "Ne spavaj gola" (Đorđević) – 3:19
7. "Odabrat ćeš gore" (Dedić) – 2:18
8. "Balada o Čorbi" (Dedić) – 3:02
9. "Kad padne noć (Upomoć)" (Đorđević) – 4:11
10. "Sve što znaš o meni" (Dedić) – 3:05
11. "Molitva" (Milena Dravić and Dedić) – 3:31
12. "Blaga kiša uspjeha" (Milena Dravić and Dedić) – 3:49
13. "Takvim sjajem može sjati" (Dedić and Đorđević) – 4:53
14. "Da, to sam ja" (Đorđević) – 4:28
15. "Prva ljubav" (Dedić) – 3:09
16. "Član mafije" (Đorđević) – 3:06
17. "Dva prijatelja" (Dedić) – 3:00
18. "Lutka sa naslovne strane" (Dedić and Đorđević) – 2:54
19. "Milena" (Dedić) – 2:52
20. "Pogledaj dom svoj, anđele" (Đorđević) – 3:41

== Personnel ==
- Arsen Dedić – vocals, piano
- Bora Đorđević – vocals
- Stjepan Mihaljinec – piano
- Vidoja Božinović – acoustic guitar
- Nikola Čuturilo – acoustic guitar, backing vocals
- Milena Dravić – speech
