= Riblja Čorba =

Serbian rock band

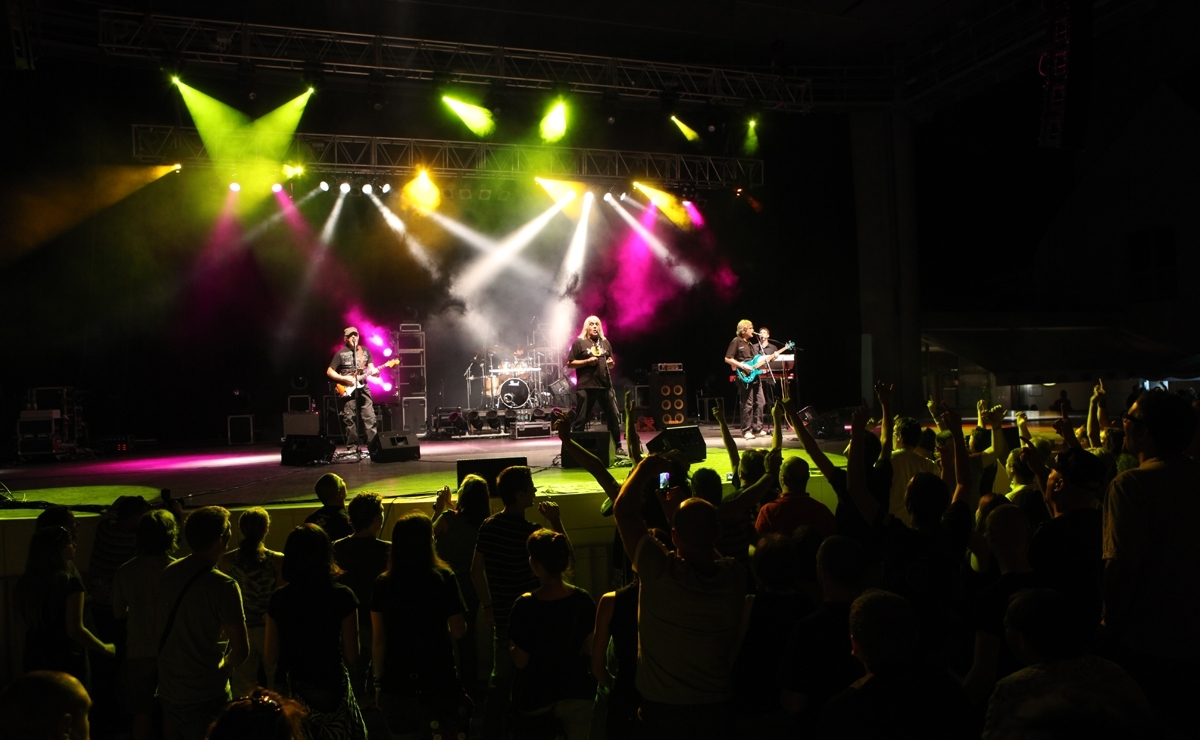
- Riblja Čorba performing in Portorož in 2010

Background information
- Origin: Belgrade, Serbia
- Genres: Rock; hard rock; blues rock; heavy metal
- Years active: 1978–2024
- Labels: PGP-RTB; Jugoton; Samy; WIT; Hi-Fi Centar; M Factory; City Records; PGP-RTS; RTV Stara Pazova; Fidbox
- Spinoffs: Bajaga i Instruktori
- Spinoff of: SOS
- Past members: Vicko Milatović; Vidoja Božinović; Nikola Zorić; Jovan Jeftić; Ivan Stanković; Bora Đorđević; Miša Aleksić; Rajko Kojić; Momčilo Bajagić; Vladimir Golubović; Nikola Čuturilo; Zoran Ilić; Vladimir Barjaktarević
- Website: www.riblja-corba.com

Riblja Čorba (Serbian Cyrillic: Рибља Чорба, pronounced [rîbʎaː tʃǒːrba]; lit. 'Fish Stew') was a Yugoslav rock band formed in Belgrade in 1978. The band has been one of the most popular and most influential acts of the Yugoslav and Serbian rock scene.

Riblja Čorba was formed in 1978 by former Zajedno, Rani Mraz and Suncokret member Borisav "Bora" Đorđević (vocals) and the members of the band SOS, Radislav "Rajko" Kojić (guitar), Miroslav "Miša" Aleksić (bass) and Miroslav "Vicko" Milatović (drums). Their debut release, the single "Lutka sa naslovne strane" (1978), saw huge success and launched them to fame. They were soon joined by guitarist Momčilo "Bajaga" Bajagić, the new lineup releasing the album Kost u grlu (1979), which was, due to their gritty hard rock sound and Đorđević's social-related lyrics, a huge commercial and critical success. Their following releases, Pokvarena mašta i prljave strasti (1981), Mrtva priroda (1981), and Buvlja pijaca (1982) launched them to the top of the Yugoslav rock scene; their works were praised for composition, musicianship, production and especially Đorđević's provocative social- and political-related lyrics, which were praised by critics and often caused media scandals. In the mid-1980s, the band saw a slight decline in popularity, but made a triumphant comeback with the album Istina (1985), recorded with the new guitar duo, Vidoja "Džindžer" Božinović and Nikola "Čutura" Čuturilo.

Until the end of the decade and the breakup of Yugoslavia, the band managed to sustain their popularity, but after the beginning of Yugoslav Wars, it heavily declined in Croatia and Bosnia and Herzegovina, due to Đorđević's support for Serbian nationalism. However, Đorđević also opposed the regime of Slobodan Milošević, demonstrating his attitude on the albums Riblja Čorba recorded during the 1990s, which were often banned in state-owned media. Since the beginning of the 2000s, the band has managed to remain one of the top acts of the Serbian rock scene, although the albums they released during the 2000s and 2010s saw little critical success. Bora Đorđević died on 4 September 2024, with the rest of the members announcing their disbandment after the release of their 21st studio album, which would be a posthumous release for Đorđević. The album, entitled Ljubav i smrt, was expected to be released in November 2024, but has been delayed for unknown reasons.

== Band history ==
=== 1970s: Formation and immediate rise to fame ===
The 1979—1984 Riblja Čorba lineup, from left to right: Miša Aleksić, Momčilo Bajagić, Vicko Milatović, Rajko Kojić and Bora Đorđević

Riblja Čorba's leader, Bora Đorđević, started performing and composing as a teenager. In his early bands he usually sang and played rhythm guitar. One of them, "Poslednji Ostatak Romantičnog Sveta" (The Last Remains of the Romantic World) featured guitarist Radomir "Točak" Mihajlović, who would later rise to fame as the leader of Smak. In the early 1970s, Đorđević had a minor role in Belgrade's Atelje 212 production of Jesus Christ Superstar and started his studies of theatre organization on the Belgrade Faculty of Dramatic Arts. At the same time, he formed the acoustic rock band Zajedno (Together), with which he recorded two 7-inch singles, the single "Vizija" ("Vision") bringing them media attention, and started contributing to the Radio Belgrade show Veče uz radio (Evening by the Radio) and music magazine Džuboks, usually with reports on the acoustic rock scene. In 1975, he left Zajedno, forming the acoustic band Suncokret, which soon gained media attention and popularity with their humorous folk rock-oriented songs. Đorđević spent three years in Suncokret, releasing the album Moje bube (My Bugs) and five 7-inch singles with the band. He decided to leave Suncokret in 1978, after the band refused to perform his new song, "Lutka sa naslovne strane" ("Doll from the Front Cover"), a ballad about a fame-hungry model, claiming the song does not fit into the band's style. Another Suncokret member, Biljana Krstić, decided to leave the band with Đorđević, and the two joined the pop rock band Rani Mraz, led by Đorđe Balašević. Đorđević, Balašević, Krstić and Verica Todorović would become the most famous Rani Mraz lineup. However, this lineup of the band lasted for only month and a half. In July 1978, Đorđević decided to leave the band.

Đorđević decided to start cooperating with the members of the band SOS. The band, formed in 1972 by Miroslav "Miša" Aleksić (bass guitar), Dragan Štulović "Štuks" (guitar) and Steva Stevanović (drums), previously released three 7-inch singles and performed as the backing band for singer-songwriter Srđan Marjanović, but did not manage to gain larger attention. The band's debut album, Prvi poziv (First Call), which featured Đorđević as guest vocalist, was refused by all major Yugoslav record labels. During the following period, SOS had gone through several lineup changes and in the summer of 1978, consisted of Aleksić, Miroslav "Vicko" Milatović (drums) and Radislav "Rajko" Kojić (guitar). On 15 August 1978, in the kafana Šumatovac in Belgrade, Đorđević and SOS members made an agreement to form a new band together. The four intended to name the band Bora i Ratnici (Bora and the Warriors), Popokatepetl (Popocatépetl) or Riblja Čorba (Fish Stew, at the time the Belgrade slang for menstruation). As Đorđević had already gained fame as a member of Suncokret and SOS had enjoyed some prominence on the Yugoslav scene, the magazine Radio TV revija published a photograph of a newly formed band as a poster, with the name Riblja Čorba printed on it, so the band members decided to continue performing under that name.

Riblja Čorba had its first concert in Elemir on 8 September 1978. In the first part of the concert, Aleksić, Kojić and Milatović performed Humble Pie, ZZ Top, Johnny Winter and Deep Purple covers, and in the second part they were joined by Đorđević, with whom they performed their songs and The Rolling Stones and Joe Cocker covers. In November, Radio Belgrade show Veče uz radio celebrated its anniversary with a large concert at Subotica Sports Hall. Riblja Čorba appeared on the concert playing only two songs but managed to win the audience's attention. They gained new fans at a fund raising concert in Sarajevo and the 1978 edition of the BOOM Festival, held in Novi Sad. On 22 December, they released their first single, "Lutka sa naslovne strane", which became an immediate hit. The song featured a guest appearance by jazz trumpeter Stjepko Gut on piano.

After the single release, Đorđević decided to leave acoustic guitar and dedicate himself to singing, and the members of the band considered adding a keyboardist to the lineup, but eventually decided to hire a rhythm guitarist. The band's new member became Momčilo Bajagić, at the time a high school student. He was recommended by Kojić, who previously played with Bajagić in the band Glogov Kolac (Hawthorn Stake). This lineup held its first concert on 7 January 1979, in Kojić's home village of Jarkovac; in the first part of the concert the band performed covers, and in the second part they performed their own songs, with Bajagić playing in the second part only. On 28 February, they held a long-promoted concert at Belgrade Youth Center, which was the band's first concert in their home city. The concert featured ballerinas, students of former prima ballerina Minka Kamberović, and during the performance of "Lutka sa naslovne strane" Đorđević broke a mannequin to pieces. During that concert, Riblja Čorba played most of the songs which would be released on their first album. At the beginning of March, the band held several concerts in Macedonia, gaining new fans. Bajagić, at the time still a high school student, managed to skip school by telling his teachers that he will be absent due to an appendectomy. However, he got into trouble after one of the teachers saw a report on the tour in Politikin Zabavnik magazine, but ended up without suffering serious consequences. After, on the band's concert in Dolovo, Aleksić fell from the stage and broke his leg, Miroslav Cvetković (who would later become a member of Bajagić's band Bajaga i Instruktori) temporarily replaced him for the band's concerts in Sandžak. On these concerts, Cvetković also sang in the covers of foreign hits. On 19 March 1979, Riblja Čorba released their second single, featuring the songs "Rock 'n' Roll za kućni savet" ("Rock 'n' Roll for Residents' Committee") and "Valentino iz restorana" ("Restaurant Valentino"). The lyrics for "Valentino iz restorana", with which the band appeared at the Opatija Festival, were co-written by Đorđević and Marina Tucaković, which was the only time in the history of the band that the author of the lyrics was someone outside the band.

Riblja Čorba spent the summer in Makarska, where they practiced for the upcoming promotion of their debut album. The concert was held on 1 September on Belgrade's Tašmajdan Stadium. Although at the time the album was still unreleased, the stadium was sold out, thanks to large media attention and low ticket prices. Bulevar and Formula 4 performed as the opening bands. Riblja Čorba played all the songs which would be released on their debut album, the songs released on their 7-inch singles, as well as the covers of Joe Cocker's version of "The Letter" and The Rolling Stones' "Jumpin' Jack Flash". The fact that the audience knew all the lyrics was a huge surprise for both the band members and the media; it was later revealed that the fans were recording Đorđević's radio interviews, during which parts of the songs were broadcast. This was the concert on which Đorđević, thanks to his stage charisma, got his concert nickname Bora Majstor (Bora the Maestro). The "anti-ballet" group Ribetine (Chicks), led by Meri Cakić, also performed at the concert; Meri Cakić, who appeared on the stage wearing garter belts, has, by some claims, inspired Đorđević to write "Lutka sa naslovne strane", although he denied the claims. Several days after the concert, Đorđević went to Doboj and Kojić went to Sarajevo, to serve their mandatory stints in the Yugoslav army. On 28 November, the band, without Đorđević, performed in Sarajevo. Kojić was on his evening leave and performed wearing a uniform. Aleksić was on vocals, but, as he did not know all the lyrics, the audience was the one who sang most of the songs. This was the only time in Riblja Čorba's career that the band performed without Đorđević. Soon after, Aleksić went to Koprivnica to serve his army stint, so the band's debut album was released during the group's hiatus.

Riblja Čorba's debut album, Kost u grlu (Bone in the Throat), recorded during the summer of 1979 and produced by Enco Lesić, was released in September 1979 through PGP-RTB record label. The album cover was designed by the cartoonist and a former Porodična Manufaktura Crnog Hleba member Jugoslav Vlahović, who would go on to design covers for most of Riblja Čorba's albums. The track "Još jedan šugav dan" ("Another Lousy Day") was originally entitled "Još jedan usran dan" ("Another Shitty Day"), but prior to recording, Đorđević was persuaded by PGP-RTB editors to change the lyrics. The song "Mirno spavaj" ("Sleep Tight") was written by Đorđević and Suncokret guitarist Nenad Božić during Đorđević's days in Suncokret, and was previously recorded for SOS' Prvi poziv. PGP-RTB editors believed that the verse "Popij svoje sedative" ("Take your sedatives") from "Mirno spavaj" might have referenced drug abuse, and initial copies of the record, with the version of the song containing this verse, were soon retrieved from the stores; about 100 copies of the album with the original version of the song were sold, and are today considered a highly valuable rarity. The album, featuring an edited version of "Mirno spavaj", soon reappeared in the stores. It was well received by fans and critics alike, mostly due to Đorđević's socially-conscious lyrics. It brought about a number of hits: "Zvezda potkrovlja i suterena" ("Star of Attics and Basements"), "Egoista" ("Egoist"), "Ja sam još ona ista budala" ("I'm Still the Same Old Fool"), and "Ostani đubre do kraja" ("Remain Scum to the End"). Kost u grlu sold about 120,000 copies, Đorđević was proclaimed the Rock Musician of the Year by most of the music magazines, and Riblja Čorba's hard rock sound with blues elements was not perceived as archaic by music critics, although the age of Yugoslav new wave had already begun.

=== Early 1980s: Nationwide popularity, Zagreb Ice Hall incident, political scandals ===
At the end of July 1980, Đorđević and Kojić, both still serving the army, appeared in Belgrade to record the song "Nazad u veliki prljavi grad" ("Back to the Big Dirty City") with Bajagić and Milatović. Đorđević was on a leave, and Kojić smuggled himself out of Sarajevo barracks. As Aleksić did not manage to get leave, bass guitar on the song was played by Bajagić. After his return to Sarajevo, Kojić was sent to army jail for two weeks; although he managed to smuggle himself back into the barracks, his superior saw a photograph of the band sitting in Kafana Šumatovac in a newspaper. "Nazad u veliki prljavi grad", recorded in one night, was released as a single on 1 September 1980. The B-side featured the original, uncensored version of "Mirno spavaj". After Đorđević and Aleksić returned from the army, the band held their comeback concert in Dadov Theater. They were announced as Zlatni Valovi Dunava (The Golden Waves of Danube), a lounge band which has been trying to sign a record contract for seven years. On the concert, the band performed new songs, written by Đorđević during his army service. In December, they were joined by Kojić, and on December 31 and January 1, they held two concerts with the hard rock band Atomsko Sklonište (Atomic Shelter). The concerts were held at Belgrade's Pionir Hall and were advertised as "Atomska Čorba" (Atomic Stew).

In February 1981, Riblja Čorba released its second album, Pokvarena mašta i prljave strasti (Perverted Imagination and Sordid Passions). The album was produced by Enco Lesić, who also played keyboards on the album and composed the song "Rekla je" ("She Said"). The songs "Nemoj, srećo, nemoj danas" ("Don't, Honey, Not Today"), "Dva dinara, druže" ("Two Dinars, Comrade") and "Evo ti za taksi" ("Here's Some for the Cab") were composed by Bajagić; while in the army, Đorđević sent Bajagić the songs' lyrics, and was surprised to discover, upon his return, that Bajagić had written music on the lyrics. The original album cover was supposed to display a photograph of naked Mrs. Adela, an eighty-year-old model at the Belgrade Academy of Fine Arts. However, shortly before the album was released, Doživjeti stotu by Bijelo Dugme appeared, with a naked old woman on the three-piece cover, so the Pokvarena mašta i prljave strasti cover ended up featuring the writer Miloš Jovančević reading a porn magazine. The album brought a large number of hits: "Ostaću slobodan" ("I'll Stay Free"), "Lak muškarac" ("Easy Man") and "Evo ti za taksi", as well as the ballads "Neke su žene pratile vojnike" ("Some Women Escorted Soldiers"), "Nemoj srećo, nemoj danas", "Dva dinara druže" and "Rekla je". By the end of 1981, the album sold more than 200,000 copies.

The band promoted the album on a large Yugoslav tour, with 59 concerts. The beginning of the tour featured two concerts in Belgrade's Pionir Hall, with about 5,000 spectators per concert. The first concert was marked by an incident: the Hall's manager refused to turn off the lights in the Hall, fearing that the audience could "demolish the parquetry". The opening band, Papatra (which featured Miroslav Cvetković), performed under the lights switched on, but Đorđević refused to go out on the stage until the lights were turned off. The efforts of the band, the Hall's management and the police to reach an agreement lasted for about an hour, and there was a danger from the angry audience's reactions, but, eventually, the management was persuaded to turn the lights off. At the end of June, they headlined a concert in Zagreb, which was organized by the newspaper Vjesnik and featured the most popular Yugoslav bands at the time. At that time, Aleksić got married so, for several concerts, he was once again replaced by Cvetković. During the tour, the band performed in Belgrade once again, on Kalemegdan. The concert featured guest appearance by Gillan bass guitarist John McCoy, who would produce the band's following album, on the cover of ZZ Top song "Tush". The concert featured about 10,000 spectators, and was, despite the fact that some of them got injured, praised by the press.

In November, the band released their third studio album, Mrtva priroda (Still Life), produced by McCoy. Mrtva priroda was the first album which featured Bajagić's lyrics, in the song "Ja sam se ložio na tebe" ("I Had the Hots for You"). It also brought Riblja Čorba's first openly political song, "Na zapadu ništa novo" ("All Quiet on the Western Front"). The album's main hits were "Volim, volim, volim, volim žene" ("I Love, Love, Love, Love Women"), "Pekar, lekar, apotekar" ("Baker, Doctor, Pharmacist"), "Ne veruj ženi koja puši Drinu bez filtera (Ostavi je)" ("Don't Trust a Woman that Smokes Non-Filter Drina (Leave Her)"), "Na zapadu ništa novo" and "Neću da ispadnem životinja" ("I Don't Want to Be an Animal"). During the first week after its release, the album sold more than 100,000 copies, becoming the fastest-selling Yugoslav album, with the final number of copies sold being more than 450,000. Mrtva priroda confirmed the band's status as the most popular Yugoslav band. New Musical Express wrote about the band, stating that Riblja Čorba is "the most popular thing in Yugoslavia after Tito".

In January 1982, with a concert in Čačak, Riblja Čorba started their Yugoslav tour. The tour's slogan was "Ko preživi – pričaće" ("Those Who Survive Will Tell the Tale"), which would prove to be a very unfortunate title. For the band's concert in Zagreb Ice Hall, held on February 8, an initial number of 10,500 tickets was sold out, and the organizers decided to put an additional number of 4,500 tickets to sale, thus making the hall overcrowded. As only two exit doors were open, in the rush at the end of the concert a fourteen-year-old girl Željka Marković was trampled, dying of injuries. Part of the Yugoslav press attacked Bora Đorđević, Riblja Čorba and rock music in general. On the rest of the tour, the organizers reduced the number of tickets, and some of the concerts were cancelled, as the organizers feared of new problems.

The song 'Na zapadu ništa novo' is generalized, but we can not accept it, because it is indirectly about us, the fighters in the War of Liberation, but also about the youth which is fighting for ideals of self-managing socialist society.

— Milan Petrovski,
Karpoš Union of Associations of Fighters in the War of Liberation

This was also the time of the first political scandal that followed Riblja Čorba. At the beginning of February, Ilustrovana Politika magazine published a letter written by a teenager, who wrote about political suitability of Đorđević and Riblja Čorba. This caused SUBNOR (Union of Associations of Fighters in the War of Liberation) of Karpoš to demand Mrtva priroda to be banned because of the lyrics "Za ideale ginu budale" ("Fools get killed for ideals") and "Kreteni dižu bune i ginu" ("Jerks start uprisings and get killed") from the song "Na zapadu ništa novo". They were soon joined in their demands by SUBNORs of Sarajevo and Bezdan, as well as by League of Communist Youth of Bosnia and Herzegovina. The scandal saw large covering in the media, which had the effect on the concerts. The band had to cut short their concert in Celje, because the firemen appointed as security were aggressive towards the audience. The concert in Sarajevo was held only after Đorđević wrote explanations for the lyrics of the songs the band would perform and signed a liability waiver, stating that he would perform the song "Na zapadu ništa novo" at his own risk. The concert in Tuzla was canceled because, as the organizers stated, "order can not be guaranteed on a concert of a group the actions of which are not in accordance with socialist morale". The scandal quieted down after Milo Dimitrijevski, the president of SUBNOR of Yugoslavia, publicly defended the band.

Riblja Čorba ended the tour in April 1982, with four concerts in Belgrade's Pionir Hall. The concerts were held a month later than initially planned, as organizers hesitated due to Zagreb tragedy, fearing they might not be able to provide adequate security. The first of the concerts was not well visited, but the following three were, with a final number of tickets sold for all four concerts about 20,000. On the last of the concerts, held on April 11, the band recorded their first live album, U ime naroda (In the Name of the People), the title alluding to the political scandal around "Na zapadu ništa novo". On the Youth Day, the band was unexpectedly awarded with May Award by the Belgrade Committee of the League of Socialist Youth, with an explanation that the band "sings about the life and the problems of young people" and that "it has become a symbol of the large part of the youth". U ime naroda was released in July, selling 120,000 copies and becoming the best-selling Yugoslav live album up to that point. Several days after the album release, Riblja Čorba, alongside Radomir Mihajlović "Točak", Aki Rahimovski and Električni Orgazam, performed on a large concert on the Square of Marx and Engels in Belgrade, organized as a sign of support for the Palestinian people.

The band's following album, Buvlja pijaca (Flea Market), was released at the end of 1982. The producer was once again John McCoy, and the album was mixed in London. The album featured Kornelije Kovač as guest keyboardist. It featured softer sound than previous Riblja Čorba albums, with some of the songs featuring woodwind and bowed string instruments. The song "Baby, Baby, I Don't Wanna Cry" was the first Riblja Čorba song written entirely by Bajagić. Bajagić originally wrote the song for singer Slađana Milošević, but Đorđević insisted that the song should be recorded by Riblja Čorba. Buvlja pijaca brought a large number of successful songs: ironic love songs "Draga ne budi peder" ("Darling, Don't be a Faggot"), "U dva će čistači odneti đubre" ("At Two A.M. the Garbage Collectors Will Collect the Trash") and "Dobro jutro" ("Good Morning"), and political songs "Ja ratujem sam" ("I'm Waging War Alone"), "Pravila, pravila" ("Rules, Rules"), "Kako je lepo biti glup" ("How Nice It Is to Be Stupid") and "Slušaj, sine, obriši sline" ("Listen Son, Wipe Your Nose"). However, the final number of copies sold was 250,000, which was less than expected by the band and the record company. Film director Mića Milošević would use most of the songs from the album in his 1982 film A Tight Spot. At this time, Đorđević was voted the Ideal Man by the readers of women magazine Bazar. As a sign of his appreciation, Đorđević wrote a joking poem "Domaćice, skinite gaćice, ja volim vaše flanelske spavaćice" ("Housewives, take off your panties, I love your flannel nightgowns"), which the magazine refused to publish.

The band started a tour two weeks after the album release. However, the audience was less interested in their concerts than on the previous tours. The concerts in Croatia were organized by Scena revolucije (Revolution Scene), an organization of Croatian SUBNOR. The tour ended with a concert in Belgrade Fair – Hall 1, which was the first concert in the hall after the 1967 Belgrade Gitarijada festival. The concert was extensively promoted. Đorđević himself threw flyers over Belgrade, Novi Sad, Zrenjanin, Šabac and Pančevo, from a plane piloted by aviator and disc jockey Zoran Modli. The concert was entitled Hleba i igara (Bread and Games), and featured the biggest stage on a Yugoslav rock concert up to that point. The concert featured about 8,000 spectators. The opening bands on the concert were Dʼ Boys, Divlji Anđeli and Siluete, the latter performing with guitarist Nikola Čuturilo, who would later become a member of Riblja Čorba. As Milatović had to leave the band after the concert due to his army stint, a barber cut his hair off on the stage. After the concert, Milatović left the band and was temporarily replaced by a former Tilt and Suncokret member Vladimir Golubović (who would later join Bajagić's band Bajaga i Instruktori).

Prior to leaving to serve the army, Milatović started a side project: he formed the heavy metal band Ratnici (later known as Warriors) with the vocalist Dušan Nikolić, but recorded only an EP with them. After he went to serve the army, Warriors recorded their debut album without Milatović, moving to Canada after its release. A short break after the Buvlja pijaca tour was used by another two Riblja Čorba members for their side projects. Kojić released his solo EP Ne budi me bez razloga (Don't Wake Me Up Without a Good Reason), with lyrics written by Đorđević and Bajagić and featuring Đorđević and Golubović as guests. The EP also featured Nenad Stefanović "Japanac" on bass guitar and Laza Ristovski on keyboards. Bajagić worked on the songs for his upcoming solo album, but found time to write several songs for Riblja Čorba's next album.

=== Mid 1980s: The crisis and decline in popularity, lineup change and comeback ===
At the end of 1983, Riblja Čorba represented Yugoslavia on an international youth festival in Bulgaria. The title of the festival was The Balkans – A Zone without Nuclear weapons. The band held four concerts, the first one, in Plovdiv, attended only by young socialist activists with special invitations, forced by security to remain on their seats throughout the whole concert. On the closing ceremony, the band performed after Greek folk dancers, Bulgarian rhythm dancers and Romanian youth theatre, which performed the play Specter of Capitalism Attacks the Youth of the East. Prior to the concert, the band was asked by the organizers not to perform the song "Kako je lepo biti glup".

Riblja Čorba's fifth studio album, Večeras vas zabavljaju muzičari koji piju (Tonight You Will Be Entertained by Musicians Who Drink), was released in 1984. As Riblja Čorba's record label PGP-RTB refused to pay for the recording in London, the band signed a contract with PGP-RTB's main competitor, Jugoton. However, the album ended up being recorded in Ljubljana and mixed in London. It was produced by Kornelije Kovač. Immediately after the album was released, state's censors declared songs "Mangupi vam kvare dete" ("Bad Boys Are Spoiling Your Kid") and "Besni psi" ("Rabid Dogs") "ethically unsuitable". The censors labeled the album as kitsch, which meant the price of it had to be higher than the regular record price. "Besni psi" even caused an international scandal. Because of the lyrics "Grčki šverceri, arapski studenti, negativni elementi, maloletni delikventi i besni psi". ("Greek smugglers, Arab students, negative elements, juvenile delinquents and rabid dogs"), embassys of three Arab countries and Zaire protested because, in their words, "Đorđević equated foreign students and rabid dogs", and the Yugoslav Ministry of Culture demanded an analysis of the song by the experts. Prior to the promotional concert in Belgrade, the Yugoslav Ministry of Foreign Affairs demanded from the band not to perform the song.

Večeras vas zabavljaju muzičari koji piju was not as nearly successful as Riblja Čorba's previous albums. Đorđević's dark, depressive lyrics were disliked by the critics, and the album's only hit was the gentle ballad "Kad hodaš" ("When You Walk"), written by Bajagić. In the spring of 1984, Bajagić's solo album Pozitivna geografija (Positive Geography) was released, and was very well received by fans and critics alike. Bajagić and the musicians he recorded Pozitivna geografija with promoted the album with a well-attended concert in Belgrade's Trade Union Hall, after which they got a large number of offers from concert organizers. On the other hand, Riblja Čorba spring tour was unsuccessful. Eight concerts were canceled due to lack of interest, and the concert in Pionir Hall was not well attended. The tour brought conflicts inside the band and revealed the existing problems: Đorđević and Aleksić had started to drink heavily, while Kojić had been addicted to heroin. After Kojić left the band during the tour on several occasions, failed to appear on two television recordings and had a car accident, Đorđević and Aleksić decided to exclude him from the band. Bajagić, however, insisted that Kojić remains a member, so Đorđević and Aleksić changed their decision. The band went on a summer break. However, they were soon offered 50,000 dollars by a hotel owner from Thessaloniki for summer performances. Đorđević phoned Bajagić, who was at the time on his vacation on Mljet, but Bajagić refused to return, explaining that, after his vacation, he had planned concerts on youth work actions with his new band, Bajaga i Instruktori. Kojić too refused to perform in Greece, and Đorđević and Aleksić decided to exclude both of them from the band. These events got large attention in the press. Both Bajaga and Kojić found out that they were excluded from the band from newspapers. Bajagić would continue his career as the leader of highly successful pop rock band Bajaga i Instruktori, while Kojić would retire from music, dying in 1997.

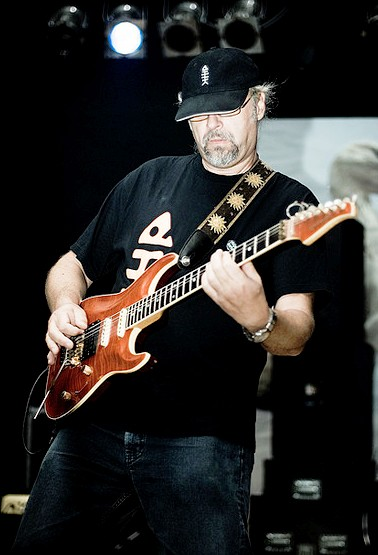
Džindžer Božinović, shown here in 2007, joined Riblja Čorba in 1984 after Bajagić and Rajko Kojić left and has remained the band's lead guitarist ever since.

Riblja Čorba's new guitarists became Vidoja "Džindžer" Božinović, formerly of Pop Mašina, Dah, Opus and Rok Mašina, and Zoran Dašić, formerly of Šamar. Soon after, Milatović returned from the army and rejoined Riblja Čorba, while Golubović moved to Bajagić's Bajaga i Instruktori. After only five rehearsals, Dašić had to leave the band due to family obligations. (He would later form the old town music band Legende, and Đorđević would write lyrics for seven and music for two songs released on their debut album.) He was replaced by Nikola Čuturilo. Prior to joining Riblja Čorba, Čuturilo was a member of the bands Kredit (which would later evolve into Laki Pingvini), Bicikl, Zamba, Siluete, and, for only couple of months, Električni Orgazam. Riblja Čorba spent the autumn of 1984 performing mostly in clubs, firming their sound and practicing for the recording of the new album. On 20 September 1984, the last evening of the 1984 Belgrade Summer Festival, the band performed in Belgrade Youth Center, the concert being announced as a performance of the band called Debeli Bogoljub i Ljuti Tezgaroši (Fat Bogoljub and Old Moonlighters). At this time, Đorđević made a guest appearance on the 1984 self-titled album by Bijelo Dugme, Riblja Čorba's main competitors at the time. Đorđević appeared on the song "Pediculis Pubis" (misspelling of "Pediculosis pubis"), having co-written it with Bijelo Dugme leader Goran Bregović and singing it with Bregović and Mladen Vojičić "Tifa". This guest appearance helped Riblja Čorba's shaken status. In the winter, the band entered the studio to record their next album.

The band's sixth studio album, Istina (The Truth), was released in 1985. Prior to album release, the band promoted it on their performance in the club Kulušić in Zagreb. The album was produced by McCoy, and recorded by Ratko Ostojić and Goran Vejvoda. Goran Bregović returned the guest appearance by singing with Đorđević in the song "Disko mišić" ("Disco Muscle"). As Jugoton refused to release the songs "Snage opozicije" ("Opposition Forces"), "Pogledaj dom svoj, anđele" ("Look Homeward, Angel"), "'Alo" ("Hello") and "Dvorska budala" ("Jester") because of their political-related lyrics, the band signed back with PGP-RTB, which refused to release only "Snage opozicije". After most of the newspapers published the lyrics of "Snage opozicije", the band gave up the idea to release it as a self-released single. (The song remained unreleased until 1997, when it appeared on the compilation album Treći srpski ustanak.) However, Đorđević had to alter the "'Alo" lyrics, replacing "S planine šakal zavija, tamo je Jugoslavija" ("A jackal is howling from the mountain, over there is Yugoslavia") with "Ja iz dalekih predela posmatram tuđa nedela" ("From the faraway lands I'm watching their misdeeds"). Although after Večeras vas zabavljaju muzičari koji piju many critics claimed that Riblja Čorba belongs to the past, Istina was praised by both fans and critics. It represented the band's triumphant comeback, mostly thanks to the song "Pogledaj dom svoj, anđele", and is often considered Riblja Čorba's magnum opus. On the Bosnian winter tour that followed the album release and featured concerts in small town Bileća and villages Donja Mahala, Matuzići and Tišina, the former YU Grupa bass guitarist Žika Jelić replaced Aleksić, who was not able to perform due to illness. At the time, Jelić was 42, Đorević was 32, and Čuturilo was 22. In May, the band held a successful concert in Belgrade Sports Hall, and Đorđević released his first book of poems entitled Ravnodušan prema plaču (Apathetic towards Crying). In a month, 10,000 copies of the book were sold.

=== Late 1980s: New successes and political scandals ===
In February 1986, the band released their eight studio album, Osmi nervni slom (Eighth Nervous Breakdown). The album was produced by Kornelije Kovač. It featured guest appearance by British reggae musician Eddy Grant on vocals in the song "Amsterdam". Grant was, after his concert in Belgrade, persuaded by Riblja Čorba members to come to the studio and sing two strophes of the song. Other guests included saxophonist Jova Maljoković, on the song "Jedan čovek" ("One Man"), and actress and Bastion vocalist Ana Kostovska, on the song "Prokleto sam" ("So Damn Alone"). The album's biggest hits were "Amsterdam" and "Nemoj da ideš mojom ulicom" ("Don't Walk Along My Street"). The political songs "Tu nema Boga, nema pravde" ("There's no God, There's no Justice") and "Južna Afrika '85. (Ja ću da pevam)" ("South Africa '85 ("I'm Gonna Sing)"), although no more explicit than songs from previous Riblja Čorba albums, had a hard time finding the way to the listeners because of the radio editors' self-censorship. At the beginning of 1986, Đorđević's lyrics were even discussed by the League of Communists of Yugoslavia's Committee for Informative and Propaganda Actions. Political dilemmas did not affect the audience: on 8 March, with a concert in Sarajevo's Skenderija, which featured some 10,000 spectators, Riblja Čorba started their most successful tour since the Mrtva priroda tour. At the end of March, they sold out Pionir Hall for the first time in four years, confirming their return to the top of the Yugoslav rock scene. During the same year, Milatović released his first solo album, U ritmu srca malog dobošara (In the Rhythm of the Little Drummer Boy's Heart). The album was produced by Kovač, and featured songs written by Milatović during Mrtva priroda and Ratnici - Warriors sessions. At the 1986 MESAM Festival, the band was awarded with the Rock Band of the Year Award, Đorđević was proclaimed Composer of the Year, and "Amsterdam" was proclaimed Hit of the Year.

In February 1987, they released their ninth studio album, Ujed za dušu (Soul Bite). The album was produced by Kovač, and featured the band's first cover, "Zadnji voz za Čačak" ("Last Train to Čačak", cover of The Monkees' "Last Train to Clarksville"). Surprisingly, the album did not feature political lyrics, with the exception of "Član mafije" ("Mafia Member"), a Caribbean music-inspired song in which Đorđević humorously described the League of Communists of Yugoslavia as mafia. The songs "Nesrećnice nije te sramota" ("Miserable Woman, Aren't You Ashamed") and "Zašto kuče arlauče" ("Why the Dog Howls") were released on a 7-inch single, which was given as a gift to the buyers of the first 1,000 copies of the album. On July 19, the band, alongside Parni Valjak, Leb i Sol and Đorđe Balašević, performed at Stadion Maksimir in Zagreb at the 1987 Summer Universiade closing ceremony.

Đorđević's 1987 unplugged performance with singer-songwriter Arsen Dedić in Terazije Theatre resulted in a famous bootleg album Arsen & Bora Čorba Unplugged '87. The performance featured Stjepan Mihaljinec on piano and Božinović and Čuturilo on guitars. In 1987, Đorđević was indicted for "disturbing the public", when he read his poems on Studio B's anniversary celebration in Sava Centar. However, the court dismissed the prosecution's charges, as Đorđević was reading poems already published in his books and in various magazines. In 1988, after reading his poems in Bar, he was, after accusations of a policeman who was present, indicted for "insulting the working people of Yugoslavia", but these charges were also dropped, after a longer process. In 1988, Đorđević released Bora priča gluposti (Bora's Talking Rubbish), which featured a recording of his poetry evening held in Belgrade's Engineering Students' Club. During the same year, he was accepted to the Association of Writers of Serbia, after writing his application on a table napkin.

In 1988, Riblja Čorba celebrated ten years of existence by releasing Priča o ljubavi obično ugnjavi (Talking about Love Is Usually Annoying), produced by Kovač, and the compilation album Riblja Čorba 10, which was released in a limited number of 1,000 copies only, and was given to the friends of the band and the media. The anniversary concert at Belgrade Fair featured some 15,000 spectators. Prior to the concert, the band had an intention to hold a fund raising concert in front of the Church of Saint Sava, with all the funds raised dedicated to the construction of the church, with Đorđe Balašević, Ekatarina Velika and Piloti as special guests, but did not get permission from the police to organize it. Although the situation in the country became more dramatic, the album did not feature many political-related songs.

During these couple of years, Čuturilo started composing and writing lyrics for acts like Dejan Cukić, YU Grupa and Kerber, and in 1988, he released his first solo album 9 lakih komada (9 Easy Pieces). After releasing his second studio album, Raskršće (Crossroads) in 1989, he decided to leave the band and dedicate himself to his solo career. The band held their last concert with Čuturilo on 14 October 1989 in Sarajevo. He was replaced by Zoran Ilić, a former Bezobrazno Zeleno member.

In 1990, the band released Koza nostra (transliteration for Cosa Nostra, but also a word play, with "Koza" meaning "goat" in Serbian). The album was produced by Saša Habić. It featured Branimir Štulić and Azra members on backing vocals, on the track "Al Kapone" ("Al Capone"), former Suncokret members Bilja Krstić, Gorica Popović and Snežana Jandrlić on backing vocals, and Bajaga i Instruktori member Saša Lokner on keyboards. The album included a cover of Chuck Berry's song "Memphis, Tennessee", Riblja Čorba version entitled "Crna Gora, Bar" ("Montenegro, Bar"), "Baby" which Đorđević wrote when he was 13, and "Tito je vaš" ("Tito Is Yours"), one of the first Yugoslav rock songs to openly ridicule late Josip Broz Tito. After the album release, the band performed in Sweden, Romania and Australia. In Romania, they performed, alongside Yugoslav acts Bajaga i Instruktori, Galija, Valentino and Viktorija, in Timișoara, on the concerts organized two months after the Romanian Revolution. All five acts performed on three concerts in Timișoara Olympia Hall in front of some 20,000 people each night.

=== 1990s: Riblja Čorba during war years and Milošević's regime ===
After the outbreak of the Yugoslav Wars in 1991, Riblja Čorba members decided to record their farewell album. Labudova pesma (Swan Song) was recorded in Vienna at the end of 1991. Oliver Mandić, a highly successful pop rock singer and composer, cooperated with the band on the recording. The idea was for Mandić to become a full-time member of the band, but, due to disagreements between him and Đorđević, the cooperation was ended, and three songs composed by him did not appear on the album. Labudova pesma, which did not turn out to be Riblja Čorba's last album, brought only one hit, "Kad sam bio mlad" ("When I Was Young", cover of Eric Burdon's "When I Was Young"), and was generally disliked by the critics, starting the series of Riblja Čorba albums with little critical acclaim. During 1992, Zoran Ilić started his side project, forming the comedy rock supergroup Babe with Bajaga i Instruktori member Žika Milenković, Električni Orgazam member Goran Čavajda and a former Bezobrazno Zeleno member Zoran Vasić.

The next Riblja Čorba album Zbogom, Srbijo (Farewell, Serbia), released in 1993, was not very successful either. Except the ballad "Jedino moje" ("My Only One"), "Zelena trava doma mog" ("Green Grass of My Home", a cover of Curly Putman's "Green Green Grass of Home"), "Danas nema mleka" ("No Milk Today", a heavy metal cover of Herman's Hermits' "No Milk Today") and "Tamna je noć" ("Dark Is the Night", a cover of Mark Bernes' "Tyomnaya noch"), the other songs from the album remained unnoticed. After the album release, Vlada Barjaktarević, a former Van Gogh member, who worked with the band on the album, became the band's first keyboard player.

At this time, Đorđević became an active supporter of Serbian nationalism. With Knin band Minđušari he recorded controversial song "E moj druže zagrebački" ("Oh, my Zagreb Comrade"), as a response to Jura Stublić's song "E moj druže beogradski" ("Oh, my Belgrade Comrade"). This had closed the door to Riblja Čorba in Croatian and Bosnian mainstream media and caused Riblja Čorba to lose a part of their fans in Croatia and Bosnia and Herzegovina. Đorđević's support for Serbian nationalism did not, however, imply support for the government of Slobodan Milošević, and he would express his attitude in Riblja Čorba political songs recorded on the band's following albums, as well as on the 1996 solo album Njihovi dani (Their Days), which was recorded by Riblja Čorba, but which he released in his own name rather than that of his band. The song "Baba Jula" ("Grandma Yula"), which alluded to Mirjana Marković, became one of the anthems of 1996–1997 protests in Serbia.

In the summer of 1996, Riblja Čorba performed in Republika Srpska, on Serb Democratic Party rallies. The band performed without Ilić, and at that point it was announced that he is not a member of the band anymore. Ilić was not replaced, and the band continued their activity with one guitarist only. The album Ostalo je ćutanje (The Rest Is Silence), released in 1996, featured a cover of John Lennon's song "Jealous Guy", Riblja Čorba version entitled "Ljubomorko" ("Jealous Guy"), and the song "Odlazi od mene, ubico, idi" ("Go Away from Me, Murderer, Leave"), originally recorded for a production of Moscow-Petushki. The latter was sung by former Suncokret singers, Biljana Krstić, Snežana Jandrlić and Gorica Popović, being the only Riblja Čorba song not to feature Đorđević on vocals. The album was followed by concerts across Canada, Australia and Europe. During the same year, Milatović started his second side project, the hard rock band Indijanci (Indians). The band's debut, self-titled album, released in 1997 and featuring guest appearance by Rajko Kojić (which was his last recording), was, mostly due to vulgar lyrics, panned by the critics. At the beginning of 1997, a compilation album Treći srpski ustanak (Third Serbian Uprising) was released, featuring a choice of Riblja Čorba political songs. The album featured previously unreleased "Snage opozicije" and one new song, "Volim i ja vas" ("I Love You, Too"), written during the 1996–97 protests. In 1997, the band held a tour named "Po slobodnim gradovima Srbije" ("Around the Free Cities of Serbia"), as the bands performed in cities in which Socialist Party of Serbia was not in power, which culminated with two concerts in Tašmajdan Stadium, on 31 May 31 and 1 June, with Rambo Amadeus, Babe, Prljavi Inspektor Blaža i Kljunovi, Direktori, Indijanci, Aleluja, and Kraljevski Apartman as the opening acts. On these two concerts Riblja Čorba recorded live albums Beograd, uživo '97 - 1 and Beograd, uživo '97 - 2. (Belgrade, Live 97 – 1 and 2). On 22 December 1997, the band was scheduled to hold a concert in Tivoli Hall in Ljubljana, however, the Slovenian authorities refused to issue visas to the members of the band because of Đorđević's political statements.

At the beginning of 1999 NATO bombing of the Federal Republic of Yugoslavia, Riblja Čorba recorded the patriotic tune "Samo Sloga Srbina Spašava" ("Only Unity Saves the Serbs") with Bajagić, Dejan Cukić, Van Gogh frontman Zvonimir Đukić and Generacija 5 frontman Đorđe David. In June of the same year, Milatović decided to leave Riblja Čorba and move to Australia, but soon changed his mind and returned to the band; the band had only one concert without him, in Zürich, Switzerland, with former Piloti member Zoran "Ćera" Obradović on drums. In November 1999, Riblja Čorba released Nojeva barka (Noah's Ark), produced by Aleksić and Miša Popović. Album featured a cover of Merle Travis' "Sixteen Tons", Riblja Čorba version entitled "16 noći" ("16 Nights"). The song "Gde si" ("Where Are You") was composed by Momčilo Bajagić, who also made a guest appearance on the song. The album also featured appearances by Branko Marušić "Čutura" (harmonica), Mirko Tomić (pedal steel guitar), Srđan Đoković (trumpet) and Slavolub Kolarević (saxophone).

=== 2000s ===
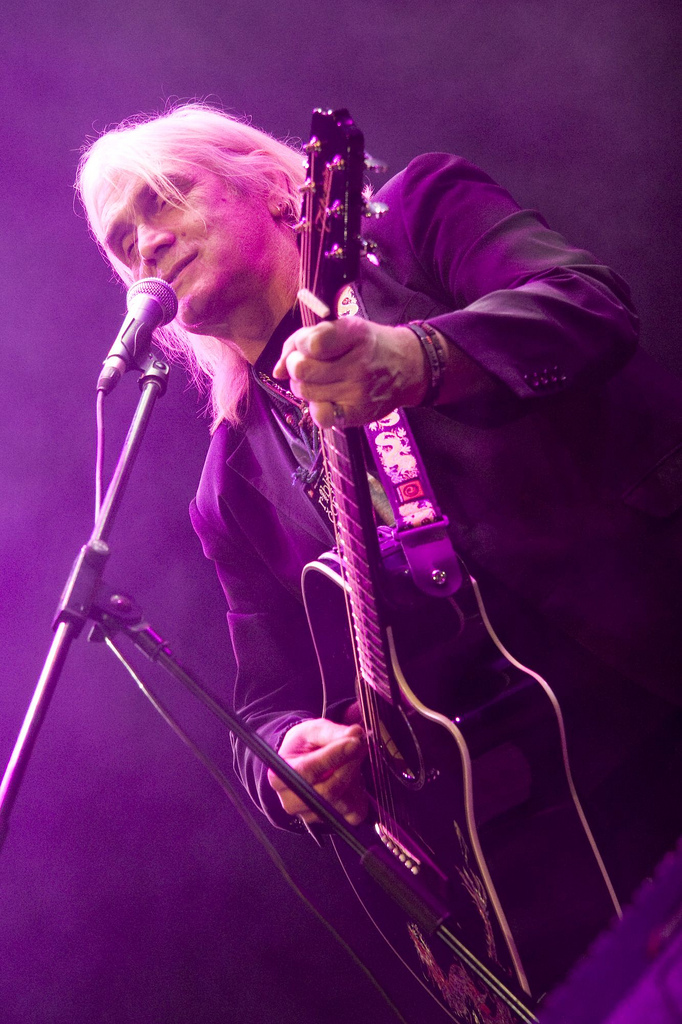
Bora Đorđević in concert, in Belgrade Arena in 2009

In 2000, Đorđević took an active role in Democratic Opposition of Serbia rallies preceding the overthrow of Slobodan Milošević. The band's first album after political changes in Serbia was Pišanje uz vetar (Pissing Against the Wind), produced by Aleksić and Milan Popović and released in 2001. The reggae song "Crno-beli svet" ("Black and White World") was a duet sung by Đorđević and Eyesburn frontman Hornsman Coyote, who also played the trombone on the song. Other guests on the album included Dejan Cukić on backing vocals, Vidoja Božinović's brother Zoran Božinović on guitar, actor Josif Tatić, who recited in the song "Čekajući čoveka" ("Waiting for a Man") and Boban Marković Trumpet Orchestra. In 2002, after the tour following the album release, Barjaktarević left the band and was replaced by Nikola Zorić, a graduate from the Belgrade Music Academy.

In 2003, Riblja Čorba released Ovde (Here), with songs "Zašto uvek kurcu sviram" and "Pičkin dim" released on the bonus CD. The album saw little success, with the ballad "Poslednja pesma o tebi" ("The Last Song About You") becoming the album's only hit. The recording featured guest appearances by Dejan Cukić, Bilja Krstić and Đorđe David. During the same year, Milatović released his second solo album, a children's music album entitled Dečaci o devojčicama (Boys about Girls), which featured Đorđević, Bajagić, Žika Milenković (of Bajaga i Instruktori and Babe), Dejan Cukić, Zvonimir Đukić "Đule" (of Van Gogh), Igor Blažević "Blaža" (of Prljavi Inspektor Blaža i Kljunovi), Miodrag "Pile" Živanović (of Alisa), Đorđe David and Billy King as guest vocalists. On 3 July 2004, Riblja Čorba, alongside the Belgrade faction of the band Zabranjeno Pušenje, held a concert at the Belgrade Ušće, to celebrate Riblja Čorba's twenty-five and Zabranjeno Pušenje's twenty years on the scene. The concert featured a large number of opening acts: Negative, Prljavi Inspektor Blaža i Kljunovi, Bjesovi, Alogia, Roze Poze, Abonos, Kraljevski Apartman and Đorđe David. However, the concert is best remembered by the fact that Zabranjeno Pušenje performed their world music-oriented material they recorded under the name The No Smoking Orchestra, which provoked their fans to throw various objects on stage, forcing the band to end their performance after only half an hour.

At the half of the 2000s, the members of the band came up with an idea of releasing a studio album in three parts, as three separate EPs. The first part of the album Trilogija (Trilogy), Trilogija 1: Nevinost bez zaštite (Trilogy 1: Virginity without Protection) was released in 2005, and the second and the third, Trilogija 2: Devičanska ostrva (Trilogy 2: Virgin Islands) and Trilogija 3: Ambasadori loše volje (Trilogy 3: Badwill Ambassadors) were released in 2006. On 10 March 2007, the band held a concert in Belgrade Arena. The concert featured Radio Television of Serbia Symphony Orchestra and Obilić Academic Choir, both conducted by Vojkan Borisavljević. On the concert, Đorđević jokingly introduced the members of the band as convicts and fugitives indicted for war crimes: Nikola Zorić as Veselin Šljivančanin, Miša Aleksić as Biljana Plavšić, Vicko Milatović as Milorad Ulemek "Legija", Vidoja Božinović as Ratko Mladić, and himself as Radovan Karadžić; the introductions, especially the introduction of Milatović as Ulemek, were much criticized by the Serbian public. The recording of the concert was released on the album Gladijatori u BG Areni (Gladiators in BG Arena), both in a live album and video album version.

At the beginning of 2009, the group released the studio album Minut sa njom (A Minute with Her). Minut sa njom was the first Riblja Čorba album since Pokvarena mašta i prljave strasti which did not feature any song with political-related lyrics. During the same year, Pošta Slovenije released the postage stamp which featured Riblja Čorba logo. The band celebrated thirty years since the release of their debut album Kost u grlu with a concert in Belgrade Arena, held on 31 October 2009. The recording of the concert was released during the following year on the live/video album entitled Niko nema ovakve ljude! (No One Has This Kind of People!).

=== 2010s ===
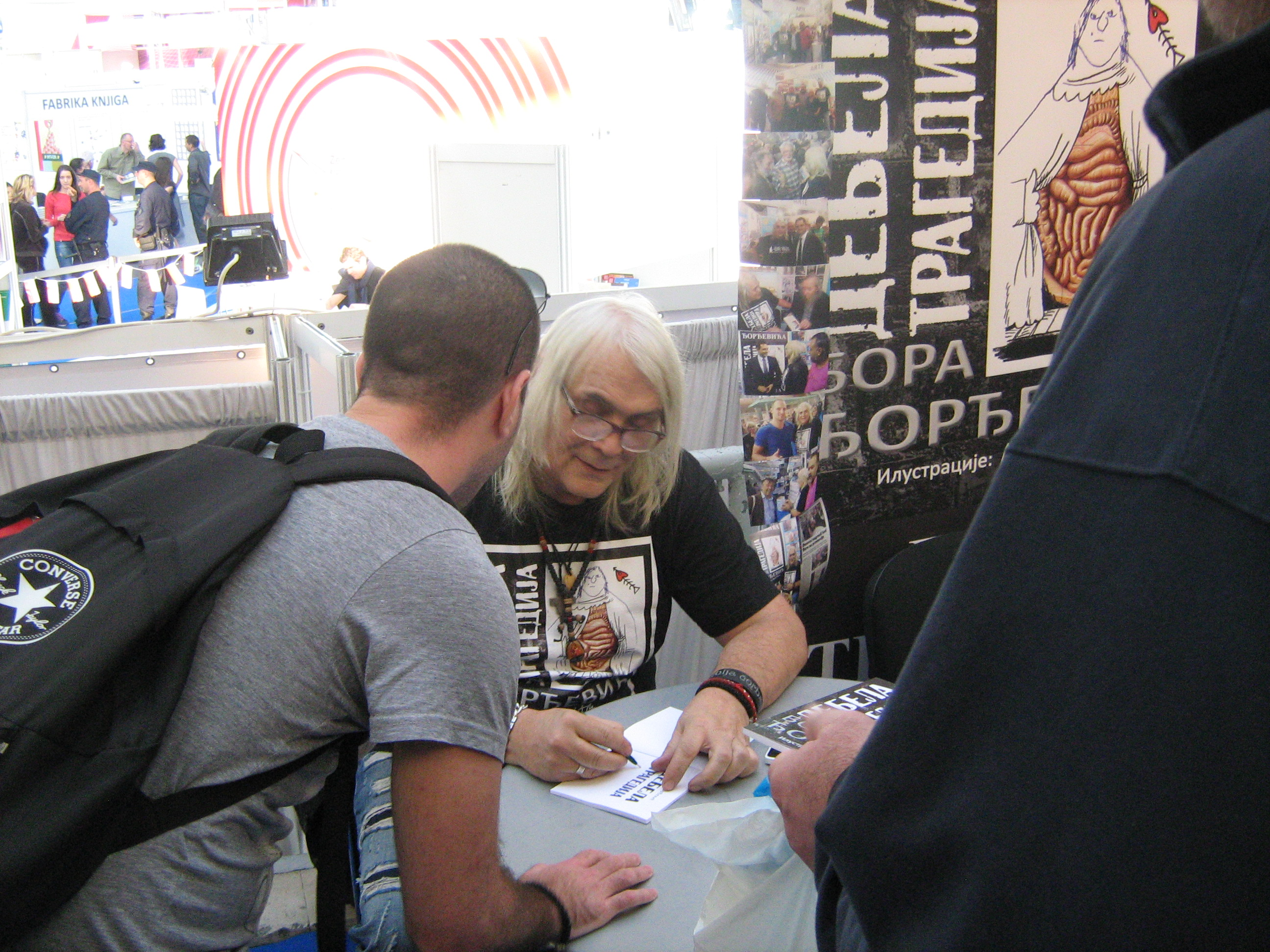
With Riblja Čorba's popularity, Đorđević, shown here signing his books at the 2013 Belgrade Book Fair, became a prominent public figure in Yugoslavia and its successor countries, especially Serbia.

In August 2011, PGP-RTS released a Riblja Čorba box set which featured twelve CDs: the first ten studio albums, the first live album, and the singles released in the 1978—1990 period and rarities on the twelfth CD. In January 2012, the band released the live album Koncert za brigadire (Concert for the Brigadiers). The album featured a recording of the band's performance on the 1985 youth work action "Đerdap 1985". The album was released through RTV Stara Pazova, on CD and, in a limited number of 1000 copies, on vinyl record. During the same year, Zorić started a side project, the band Kontrast (Contrast), with which he released the album Trenutni hir (Momentary Caprice).

On 15 November 2012, the band released the studio album entitled Uzbuna! (Alarm!). The album was released both on CD through City Records, and on vinyl through Fidbox. The album was produced by John McCoy, with whom the band cooperated again after 27 years. At the same time, a 7-inch single, featuring the songs "Uzbuna!" and "Užasno mi nedostaje" ("I Miss Her so Much"), the latter recorded live, was released through Fidbox. The band celebrated 35 years of activity with a concert in Kombank Arena, held on 23 March 2013. The concert featured guest appearances by McCoy and former members Bajagić and Čuturilo. In October 2013, the band performed in London's 100 Club. During the same month, Radio Television of Serbia broadcast a four-part documentary about Đorđević and the band, entitled Uporno dozivanje anđela (Persistent Invocation of Angels), written by and directed by Slobodan Simojlović. In late 2014, the band held a series of unplugged concerts across Serbia. The concerts, which were the first unplugged concerts since the beginning of the band's career, featured Block Out member Miljko Radonjić on drums (Milatović playing percussions) and string decet Metamorfozis. On 22 April 2016, the band performed, alongside Van Gogh, Piloti, Galija and Električni Orgazam, on the opening of renovated Tašmajdan Stadium.

On 22 April 2019, the band performed, alongside Oliver Mandić and folk singer Aca Lukas, on a political rally entitled "Budućnost Srbije" ("The Future of Serbia"), organized in Belgrade by the ruling Serbian Progressive Party a week after a mass anti-government protest in Serbian capital. Đorđević stated that the band played on the rally "out of purely patriotic reasons". He stated that "Vučić, Dačić and the others [from the government] are working for Serbia, and in opposition's demands we see only their desire to come to power". He stated that the band's appearance on the rally represents his support to president Aleksandar Vučić and Serbian government in their "fight for Kosovo" and that the performance does not mark his return to politics. The band's decision to perform on the rally caused an outrage among a large part of the band's fans, some of them declaring end of their support for the band. In September of the same year, after seven years since the latest, Riblja Čorba released their twentieth studio album entitled Da tebe nije (If There Wasn't For You). The album was released through City Records. It was the band's first release to feature a new official member, backing vocalist Jovan Jeftić "Joca Zmaj", who performed live with the band during the previous years. Da tebe nije is the band's first album since Večeras vas zabaljaju muzičari koji piju to feature a song with lyrics not written by Đorđević, "Otvori oči" ("Open Your Eyes"), written by Jeftić. The album featured the song "Ivica Dačić" as a bonus track. The song was named after and spoke about president of the Socialist Party of Serbia, who was at the time of the album release in office as the Serbian Minister of Foreign Affairs. It caused new criticism from audience and public figures; most of them saw the song as a praise to a member of the regime Đorđević and the band protested against during the 1990s.

=== 2020s: Deaths of Aleksić and Đorđević and the last album ===
On 29 November 2020, Miša Aleksić died due to complications of COVID-19. The band's new bass guitarist became Ivan Stanković, previously a longtime technician for the band. The band held a concert in memory of Aleksić on 16 August 2021 on Tašmajdan Stadium. The concert featured several guests: former Riblja Čorba members Momčilo Bajagić and Nikola Čuturilo, YU Grupa members Žika and Dragi Jelić and Van Gogh frontman Zvonimir Đukić.

In 2021, Đorđević was awarded the Order of Karađorđe's Star by the President of Serbia, Aleksandar Vučić, for his contribution to Serbian culture. In September of the same year, the band released their ninth live album, Beograd 1981 (Belgrade 1981). The album featured the recordings from the concert the band held in Belgrade Sports Hall on 28 March 1981. The album was released by Fidbox in a limited number of copies.

At the end of August 2024, Đorđević was admitted to a hospital in Ljubljana due to acute exacerbation of chronic obstructive pulmonary disease (COPD). He died from pneumonia on the morning of 4 September, at the age of 71.

The spot was filled by former backing vocalist, Jovan Jeftić (Čika Joca Zmaj).

The band performed on Đorđević's birthday in his hometown Čačak for a small audience with the concert lasting about half an hour. In May of 2025, Riblja čorba performed at the Šabac Moto Klub festival, having their first full length concert without Đorđević. There were also performances in: Zrenjanin, Belgrade, Zeta, Skopje, Vienna, Kragujevac, Herceg Novi and Novi Sad.

== Legacy ==
In the mid 1980s, Bora Đorđević was the unequaled populist tribune of SFRY rock 'n' roll, Bruce Springsteen from Belgrade, the rock-mammoth respected by all, the idol of (sub)urban working class and student masses, and the dream of high school girls from Vardar to Triglav. It seemed that there isn't a thing in sight which could overcloud his popularity and significance – and make his wallet thicker – and that B.Č. will continue to cause a stir in these parts for decades to come, like some sort of Čačak Jagger, a singing gerontocrat who – just like anyone who is out of petty-bourgeois format and standard – can only be viciously hated and envied.

Then, however, came The Happening of the People in Serbia, and Bora Čorba – with symptoms of patriotic fever already noticed earlier – joyfully rushed to the "Invading Vulgarity" (Merezhkovsky), trying somehow to place himself on the spearhead of its musical section. Thus began the still-lasting sad rambling and the social self-collapse of a (the) authentic monument of Serbian rock-mainstream: from public support to Slobodan Milošević when he had just come to power, over idealistic love towards Vuk and Šešelj from their where-there-are-Serbian-graves-there-should-be-Serbian-land phase, and then Karadžić, Mladić, Arkan, and, generally, anyone who "at that point", as it seemed to Đorđević, had the capability and will to rightfully expand the borders of Serbia from Ancona to Ankara.

- Teofil Pančić in 1999

The tradition of poetic expression in our rock music leads from Dedić, over Mlinarec, Topić, Bregović, Štulić, Balašević, Šifrer, Bajagić, Predin, Mladenović, Karajlić, then Rambo, Cane, Kanjevac and Kebra to Marčelo. In this chain Bora Đorđević is a case of its own. [...]

He belongs to the line of born oppositionists in our poetry and culture. No matter how much he jeopardizes gained position with his maneuvering between pissing against the wind and participating in power, he still possesses an astonishing power of verse, emotional motility and an ocean of talent.

Đorđević, to put it simply, resembles his cocky nation. Brought up on questionable myths, questionable victories and unquestionable art, at the same time brought up to believe than injustice is a part of fate. A Serb of desolate sensitivity, he actually wandered into rock and roll. [...]

Irreducible to the known framework, Bora would grow into a unique phenomenon in our culture, not only in poetry and rock and roll. The choirmaster of hurricanic words, the volunteer to fight the wars on the field of dignity and honor in the name of us all. Inside him awakened the Šumadija destroyer, endlessly gifted and stubborn, untypical, but leaning towards romantic-loser poetry of these lands, of diverse verse, of authoritative lingo, of immeasurable imagination and unstoppable tongue. [...]

Constantly between the anthological achievements and the need for engagement in current affairs, a constant suspect, Bora took his song out of the serious frames of poetry into the street, where one lives and speaks on the razor's edge: rudely, bravely, foul-mouthed, without apologies, but always sentimentally, with an open heart, shaped by various vices, left in some late-night bar or on kafana table. With an undertaking to sing the truth, he was the first to reduce the politics to street levels, demystifying its protagonists once and for all. As such, he could not but take part.

He is a poet who did not remain silent in the presence of history. That makes the objective evaluation of his work harder.

In any case, that truth is multi-layered, and because of it Bora and Riblja Čorba went through a merciless peace of hell. Because of his engagement as an oppositionist, a patriot, a nationalist, a government official, he lost the market, the audience and the territory. And sympathies. [...]

Barking in all directions made Bora the Rebel into and interpreter-on-call for national interests. Together with rock and roll, he took on himself the geostrategic, patriotic and ecclesiastical duties.

Instead of wisely enjoying the heydays of his career, this Gavroche from the barricades of our misunderstandings squandered the profusion of talent in quarrels, on battlefields, in political rallies and in daily politics.

— Petar "Peca" Popović in 2011.

Riblja Čorba is one of the most popular, best-selling and most influential acts of the Yugoslav rock scene, and Bora Đorđević is widely considered one of the most notable and influential authors in the history of Yugoslav rock. Riblja Čorba's and Bora Đorđević's work has been praised by singer-songwriter Arsen Dedić, singer-songwriter Đorđe Balašević, Vatreni Poljubac leader Milić Vukašinović, Prljavo Kazalište guitarist and leader Jasenko Houra, former Azra leader Branimir "Džoni" Štulić, singer-songwriter and former Lačni Franz leader Zoran Predin, former Doktor Spira i Ljudska Bića leader Dušan Mihajlović "Spira", and others. Riblja Čorba's work has been cited as influence by the members of Hladno Pivo, Bjesovi and others. Riblja Čorba songs were covered by acts such are Prljavi Inspektor Blaža i Kljunovi, Zaklonišče Prepeva, Sick Mother Fakers, Six Pack, Alogia, Bjesovi, Del Arno Band and others. Riblja Čorba remains one of the top mainstream acts on the Serbian rock scene, however, Bora Đorđević's support for Serbian nationalism during Yugoslav wars has caused a large decline in the band's popularity, especially in Croatia and Bosnia and Herzegovina.

The book YU 100: najbolji albumi jugoslovenske rok i pop muzike (YU 100: The Best albums of Yugoslav pop and rock music), published in 1998, features eight Riblja Čorba albums: Kost u grlu (polled No. 16), Mrtva priroda (polled No. 19), Pokvarena mašta i prljave strasti (polled No. 23), Istina (polled No. 43), Buvlja pijaca (polled No. 64), Večeras vas zabavljaju muzičari koji piju (polled No. 80), Osmi nervni slom (polled No. 83), and U ime naroda (polled No. 85). The list of 100 greatest Yugoslav album, published by Croatian edition of Rolling Stone in 2015, features two Riblja Čorba albums, Pokvarena mašta i prljave strasti (ranked No. 13) and Mrtva priroda (ranked No. 22). In 1987, in YU legende uživo (YU Legends Live), a special publication by Rock magazine, U ime naroda was pronounced one of 12 best Yugoslav live albums. In 2021 the album Nojeva barka was polled No. 46 on the list of 100 Best Serbian Albums Since the Breakup of SFR Yugoslavia. The list was published in the book Kako (ni)je propao rokenrol u Srbiji (How Rock 'n' Roll in Serbia (Didn't) Came to an End).

The song "Pogledaj dom svoj, anđele" was voted Hit of the Year in 1985 by the listeners of Radio Beograd 202 and Song of the Decade in 1990. In 2009, the song was voted the Greatest Domestic Song by the readers of the Standard magazine. The Rock Express Top 100 Yugoslav Rock Songs of All Times list, published in 2000, featured six songs by Riblja Čorba: "Pogledaj dom svoj, anđele" (polled No.1), "Dva dinara, druže" (polled No.2), "Ostani đubre do kraja" (polled No.25), "Lutka sa naslovne strane" (polled No.35), "Rock 'n' roll za kućni savet" (polled No. 64) and "Kad padne noć (Upomoć)" (polled No.76). The B92 Top 100 Yugoslav songs list features two songs by Riblja Čorba: "Kad hodaš" (ranked No.4) and "Lutka sa naslovne strane" (ranked No.12). In 2011, "Pogledaj dom svoj, anđele" and "Lutka sa naslovne strane" were polled, by the listeners of Radio Beograd 202, two of 60 greatest songs released by PGP-RTB/PGP-RTS during the sixty years of the label's existence.

The lyrics of 12 Riblja Čorba songs (11 written by Đorđević and 1 written by Bajagić) were featured in Petar Janjatović's book Pesme bratstva, detinjstva & potomstva: Antologija ex YU rok poezije 1967 - 2007 (Songs of Brotherhood, Childhood & Offspring: Anthology of Ex YU Rock Poetry 1967 – 2007).

In 2009, Pošta Slovenije released the postage stamp which featured Riblja Čorba logo. In 2016, Serbian weekly news magazine Nedeljnik pronounced Bora Đorđević one of 100 people that changed Serbia forever.

In 2021, Đorđević was awarded the Order of Karađorđe's Star by the President of Serbia, Aleksandar Vučić, for his contribution to Serbian culture.

== Members ==
Former members

- Vicko Milatović – drums (1978–1983, 1984–2024)
- Vidoja Božinović – guitar (1984–2024)
- Nikola Zorić – keyboards (2002–2024)
- Jovan Jeftić – backing vocals (2014–2024)
- Ivan Stanković – bass guitar (2020–2024)
- Bora Đorđević – vocals (1978–2024; his death)
- Miša Aleksić – bass guitar (1978–2020; his death)
- Rajko Kojić – guitar (1978–1984)
- Momčilo Bajagić – guitar (1978–1984)
- Vladimir Golubović – drums (1983–1984)
- Zoran Dašić – guitar (1984)
- Nikola Čuturilo – guitar (1984–1989)
- Zoran Ilić – guitar (1989–1996)
- Oliver Mandić – keyboards (1991–1992)
- Vlada Barjaktarević – keyboards (1993–2002)

== Discography ==
=== Studio albums ===
- Kost u grlu (1979)
- Pokvarena mašta i prljave strasti (1981)
- Mrtva priroda (1981)
- Buvlja pijaca (1982)
- Večeras vas zabavljaju muzičari koji piju (1984)
- Istina (1985)
- Osmi nervni slom (1986)
- Ujed za dušu (1987)
- Priča o ljubavi obično ugnjavi (1988)
- Koza nostra (1990)
- Labudova pesma (1992)
- Zbogom, Srbijo (1993)
- Ostalo je ćutanje (1996)
- Nojeva barka (1999)
- Pišanje uz vetar (2001)
- Ovde (2003)
- Trilogija (2007)
- Minut sa njom (2009)
- Uzbuna! (2012)
- Da tebe nije (2019)

=== Live albums ===
- U ime naroda (1982)
- Nema laži, nema prevare (1995)
- Od Vardara pa do Triglava (1996)
- Beograd Live '97 (1997)
- Gladijatori u BG areni (2007)
- Niko nema ovakve ljude! (2010)
- Koncert za brigadire (2011)
- Čorba se čuje i bez struje (2015)
- Live OFK Karaburma (2017)
- Beograd 1981 (2021)
- Live Belgrade Beer Fest (2025)

=== Singles ===
- Lutka sa naslovne strane (1978)
- Rock'n'roll za kućni savet (1979)
- Nazad u veliki, prljavi grad (1980)
- Priča o Žiki Živcu (1984)
- Pogledaj dom svoj anđele (1985)
- Poklon za vas (1987)
- Zadnji voz za Čačak (1987)
- Nesrećnice nije te sramota (1987)
- Uzbuna! (2012)

== Bibliography ==
- EX YU ROCK enciklopedija 1960–2006, Janjatović Petar; ISBN 978-86-905317-1-4
- Riblja čorba, Jakovljević Mirko; ISBN 86-83525-39-2
