= Kad hodaš =

Single by Riblja Čorba
- B-side: "Priča o Žiki Živcu"
- Released: 11 April 1984
- Recorded: Tivoli Studio, Ljubljana; 1984
- Genre: Hard rock
- Length: 7:06
- Label: PGP-RTB
- Songwriter: Momčilo Bajagić

Riblja Čorba singles chronology
"Nazad u veliki prljavi grad" (1980)	"Kad hodaš" (1984)	"Nesrećnice nije te sramota" (1987)

"Kad hodaš" (trans. "When You Walk") is a single from Serbian and former Yugoslav rock band Riblja Čorba.

The B-side features the song "Priča o Žiki Živcu" (trans. "The Story of grumpy Žika"). The title song is widely considered to be one of the most popular and powerful ballads of ex-Yugoslav rock music.

== Background ==
The song "Kad hodaš" was written by the band's guitarist Momčilo Bajagić for the band's 1984 album Večeras vas zabavljaju muzičari koji piju.

In 2009, pop/rock singer Marina Perazić claimed that she (at the time singer in the synthpop duo Denis & Denis) and Bajagić had a short-time relationship in the 1980s and that Bajagić dedicated "Kad hodaš" to her. However, Bajagić denied the claim that the song was dedicated to Perazić.

== Other versions ==
After he left Riblja Čorba, Bajagić continued to perform the song with his new band, Bajaga i Instruktori. Bajaga i Instruktori live album Neka svemir čuje nemir features a version of the song.

== Legacy ==
In 2006, "Kad hodaš" was ranked #4 on the B92 Top 100 Yugoslav songs list.

== Track listing ==
1. "Kad hodaš" - 4:06
2. "Priča o Žiki Živcu" - 3:00

== Personnel ==
- Bora Đorđević - vocals
- Miša Aleksić - bass guitar
- Rajko Kojić - guitar
- Momčilo Bajagić - guitar
- Vladimir Golubović - drums
