= Kost u grlu =

Studio album by Riblja Čorba
- Released: September 11, 1979
- Recorded: June 1979
- Studio: Studio V PGP-RTB, Belgrade
- Genre: Hard rock; heavy metal
- Length: 30:39
- Label: PGP-RTB
- Producer: Enco Lesić

Riblja Čorba chronology
Kost u grlu (1979)	Pokvarena mašta i prljave strasti (1981)

Kost u grlu (trans. Bone in the Throat) is the 1979 debut album from Serbian and former Yugoslav rock band Riblja Čorba.

The album was polled in 1998 as the 16th on the list of 100 greatest Yugoslav rock and pop albums in the book YU 100: najbolji albumi jugoslovenske rok i pop muzike (YU 100: The Best albums of Yugoslav pop and rock music).

== Album cover ==
The album cover was designed by Jugoslav Vlahović, who would design the covers for all Riblja Čorba's following studio albums, except for Osmi nervni slom and Koza nostra.

== Track listing ==
No.	Title	Lyrics	Music	Length
1.	"Rock 'n' Roll za kućni savet" ("Rock 'n' Roll for Residents' Committee")	B. Đorđević	B. Đorđević	2:39
2.	"Zvezda potkrovlja i suterena" ("Star of Attics and Basements")	B. Đorđević	M. Aleksić	2:49
3.	"Rasprodaja bola" ("Pain Sale")	B. Đorđević	R. Kojić	3:22
4.	"Pozajmila je pare, poludela je skroz, kupila je kartu i sela je u voz" ("She Borrowed the Money, Went Completely Crazy, Bought a Ticket And Caught a Train")	B. Đorđević	B. Đorđević	2:33
5.	"Ja sam još ona ista budala" ("I'm Still the Same Old Fool")	B. Đorđević	B. Đorđević	3:45
6.	"Još jedan šugav dan" ("Another Lousy Day")	B. Đorđević	R. Kojić	3:04
7.	"Hej, ćale" ("Hey, Dad")	B. Đorđević	R. Kojić	3:07
8.	"Mirno spavaj" ("Sleep Tight")	B. Đorđević	N. Božić, B. Đorđević	2:33
9.	"Egoista" ("Egoist")	B. Đorđević	B. Đorđević	2:18
10.	"Ostani đubre do kraja" ("Remain Scum to the End")	B. Đorđević	M. Aleksić, B. Đorđević	4:29

== Personnel ==
- Bora Đorđević - vocals
- Rajko Kojić - guitar
- Momčilo Bajagić - guitar
- Miša Aleksić - bass guitar
- Vicko Milatović - drums

=== Additional personnel ===
- Enco Lesić - piano, producer
- Tahir Durkalić - recorded by

== Reception and legacy ==
The album was an immediate success and sold more than 120,000 copies.

The album was polled in 1998 as the 16th on the list of 100 greatest Yugoslav rock and pop albums in the book YU 100: najbolji albumi jugoslovenske rok i pop muzike (YU 100: The Best albums of Yugoslav pop and rock music).

== Covers ==
- Slovenian band Zaklonišče Prepeva released a cover of the song "Zvezda potkrovlja i suterena" entitled "Jugoslavija blues" on their 1996 album Nešto kao Džimi Hendriks.
