= Riblja Čorba 10 =

Compilation album by Riblja Čorba
- Released: February 15, 1987
- Recorded: 1978–1987
- Genre: Hard rock; heavy metal
- Length: 38:14
- Label: PGP-RTB
- Producer: Various

Riblja Čorba chronology
Ujed za dušu (1987)	Riblja Čorba 10 (1987)	Priča o ljubavi obično ugnjavi (1988)

Riblja Čorba 10 is a promo compilation album by Serbian and former Yugoslav rock band Riblja Čorba. Riblja Čorba 10 is the band's first official compilation album. It was released in 1987 in a limited number of 1,000 copies only, to mark Riblja Čorba's ten years of existence, and was given to the friends of the band and the media.

== Track listing ==
1. "Lutka sa naslovne strane" - 3:07
2. "Ostani đubre do kraja" - 4:38
3. "Nazad u veliki prljavi grad" - 3:03
4. "Na zapadu ništa novo" - 3:05
5. "Dva dinara druže" - 4:02
6. "Dobro jutro" - 4:33
7. "Kad hodaš" - 4:05
8. "Pogledaj dom svoj, anđele" - 3:37
9. "Amsterdam" - 3:46
10. "Kada padne noć (Upomoć)" - 4:25

== Credits ==
- Bora Đorđević - vocals
- Rajko Kojić - guitar
- Momčilo Bajagić - guitar
- Vidoja Božinović - guitar
- Nikola Čuturilo - guitar
- Miša Aleksić - bass guitar
- Vicko Milatović - drums
- Vladimir Golubović - drums
