= Pokvarena mašta i prljave strasti =

Studio album by Riblja Čorba
- Released: February 23, 1981
- Recorded: December 1980 – February 1981
- Studio: Druga Maca Studio, Belgrade
- Genre: Hard rock; heavy metal
- Length: 38:26
- Label: PGP-RTB
- Producer: Enco Lesić

Riblja Čorba chronology
| Kost u grlu (1979) | Pokvarena mašta i prljave strasti (1981) | Mrtva priroda (1981) |

Pokvarena mašta i prljave strasti (trans. Perverted Imagination and Sordid Passions) is the second studio album from Serbian and former Yugoslav rock band Riblja Čorba, released in 1981.

In 1998, the album was polled as the 23rd on the list of 100 greatest Yugoslav rock and pop albums in the book YU 100: najbolji albumi jugoslovenske rok i pop muzike (YU 100: The Best albums of Yugoslav pop and rock music). In 2015, the album was pronounced the 13th on the list of 100 greatest Yugoslav albums published by Croatian edition of Rolling Stone.

== Album cover ==
The album cover was designed by Jugoslav Vlahović.

The original album cover was supposed to display a photograph of naked Mrs. Adela, an eighty-year-old model at the University of Arts' Faculty of Fine Arts in Belgrade. However, shortly before the album was released, Bijelo Dugme's Doživjeti stotu came out with a naked old woman on the three-piece cover, so the Pokvarena mašta i prljave strasti cover ended up featuring writer Miloš Jovančević reading a porn magazine.

== Track listing ==
| No. | Title | Lyrics | Music | Length |
|---|---|---|---|---|
| 1. | "Srećan put pišo moja mala" ("Happy Trip, My Little Winky”) | B. Đorđević | B. Đorđević, M. Bajagić | 2:23 |
| 2. | "Nemoj srećo, nemoj danas" ("Don't, Honey, Not Today") | B. Đorđević | M. Bajagić | 3:05 |
| 3. | "Vidiš da sam gadan kad sam tebe gladan" ("You See That I'm Nasty When I'm Hungry For You") | B. Đorđević | R. Kojić | 2:39 |
| 4. | "Vrlo, vrlo zadovoljan tip" ("A Very, Very Content Guy") | B. Đorđević | B. Đorđević | 3:21 |
| 5. | "Neke su žene pratile vojnike" ("Some Women Were Escorting Soldiers") | B. Đorđević | B. Đorđević | 4:24 |
| 6. | "Ostaću slobodan" ("I'll Stay Free") | B. Đorđević | M. Aleksić | 2:34 |
| 7. | "Hajde, sestro slatka" ("Come On, Sweet Sister") | B. Đorđević | B. Đorđević | 5:00 |
| 8. | "Lak muškarac" ("Easy Man") | B. Đorđević | B. Đorđević | 2:15 |
| 9. | "Dva dinara druže" ("Two Dinars, Comrade") | B. Đorđević | M. Bajagić | 4:05 |
| 10. | "Evo ti za taksi" ("Here's Some for the Cab") | B. Đorđević | M. Bajagić | 3:05 |
| 11. | "Rekla je" ("She Said") | B. Đorđević | E. Lesić | 5:35 |

== Personnel ==
- Bora Đorđević - vocals, harmonica, acoustic guitar, percussion
- Rajko Kojić - guitar
- Momčilo Bajagić - guitar, backing vocals
- Miša Aleksić - bass guitar, backing vocals
- Vicko Milatović - drums

=== Additional personnel ===
- Enco Lesić - piano, keyboard, producer
- Dušan Vasiljević - recorded by
- Miroslav Cvetković - recorded by

== Reception ==
Professional ratings
Review scores
| Source | Rating |
|---|---|
| Džuboks | Favorable |

By the end of 1981, more than 200,000 copies were sold.

== Legacy ==
In 1998, the album was polled as the 23rd on the list of 100 greatest Yugoslav rock and pop albums in the book YU 100: najbolji albumi jugoslovenske rok i pop muzike (YU 100: The Best albums of Yugoslav pop and rock music).

In 2015, the album was pronounced the 13th on the list of 100 greatest Yugoslav albums published by Croatian edition of Rolling Stone. The magazine wrote:

Passionate rock, with tense vocal chords, tons of sweat and emotions had its amount of "perverted imagination and sordid passions". Actually, there was nothing perverted and sordid in the songwriting of talented Bora Đorđević, who, in the songs of outstanding emotional realism, mentioned and accurately revealed the "dark sides" of life, the twosome, man-woman, and society in general. Brilliant, perspicacious lyrics about the life in a "big dirty city" [...] on Pokvarena mašta i prljave strasti resulted in one of the best albums of yu rock, expanding the thematic circle of Đorđević and Čorba from their superb debut, Kost u grlu. Huge commercial success - fueled primarily by exquisite songs which became the new standard - led to recording of following albums, Mrtva priroda and Buvlja pijaca, with foreign producer, but raw sound of Pokvarena mašta was the perfect outlet for Đorđević's songs, which, alongside the growing repertoire of Branimir Štulić, during those years swept away everything in their path and marked the establishing of a great new talent [...] Pokvarna mašta is the peak of neorealism of domestic rock, not new wave, but "black wave", some sort of equivalent to Žika Pavlović and the 1960s films of Serbian Black Wave.

In 2015 Pokvarena mašta i prljave strasti album cover was ranked 18th by web magazine Balkanrock on their list of 100 Greatest Album Covers of Yugoslav Rock.
