= Nesrećnice nije te sramota =

Single by Riblja Čorba
- B-side: "Zašto kuče arlauče"
- Released: February 2, 1987
- Recorded: 1987
- Genre: Hard rock
- Length: 5:44
- Label: PGP-RTB

Riblja Čorba singles chronology
"Kad hodaš" (1984)	"Nesrećnice nije te sramota" (1987)	"Zadnji voz za Čačak" (1987)

"Nesrećnice nije te sramota" is a single from Serbian and former Yugoslav rock band Riblja Čorba. The single was given as a gift to the buyers of Riblja Čorba 1987 album Ujed za dušu.

B-side features song "Zašto kuće arlauče".

== Track listing ==
1. "Nesrećnice nije te sramota" - 2:42
2. "Zašto kuče arlauče" - 3:00

== Personnel ==
- Bora Đorđević - vocal
- Miša Aleksić - bass guitar
- Vidoja Božinović - guitar
- Nikola Čuturilo - guitar
- Vicko Milatović - drums
