= Večeras vas zabavljaju muzičari koji piju =

Studio album by Riblja Čorba
- Released: March 14, 1984
- Recorded: 7 January – March 1984
- Studio: Tivoli Studio, Ljubljana
- Genre: Rock
- Length: 35:44
- Label: Jugoton
- Producer: Kornelije Kovač

Riblja Čorba chronology
| Buvlja pijaca (1982) | Večeras vas zabavljaju muzičari koji piju (1984) | Istina (1985) |

Večeras vas zabavljaju muzičari koji piju (English: "The Hard-Drinking Musicians Will Be Your Entertainment, Tonight") is the fifth studio album from Serbian and former Yugoslav rock band Riblja Čorba.

The album was polled in 1998 as the 80th on the list of 100 greatest Yugoslav rock and pop albums in the book YU 100: najbolji albumi jugoslovenske rok i pop muzike (YU 100: The Best albums of Yugoslav pop and rock music).

== Background and recording ==
Although the band's guitarist Momčilo Bajagić had already been set to venture out on his own, he still contributed significantly to Večeras vas zabavljaju muzičari koji piju by authoring two and co-writing another two songs. Furthermore, drummer Vladimir Golubović who worked with Bajagić on his side project, Pozitivna geografija, was brought in to temporarily replace Vicko Milatović who had been away serving his mandatory Yugoslav People's Army (JNA) stint. Večeras vas zabavljaju muzičari koji piju would be the only album recorded with Golubović and the last album before Bajagić and Rajko Kojić left the band.

As Riblja Čorba's record label, PGP-RTB, declined to facilitate the band's wish of recording the album in London, the group decided to move to Jugoton, a high-profile business decision that, in and of itself, received a lot of attention in the Yugoslav press. For their part, Jugoton, while not willing to finance the recording in London either, nevertheless agreed to at least pay for the album to be mixed in London. Still, Večeras vas zabavljaju muzičari koji piju would end up being the only album the band released through Jugoton as, within a year, they returned to PGP-RTB for their next studio release.

In his autobiography Uživo!: Autobiografija (Live!: Autobiography) the band's bass guitarist Miša Aleksić described the atmosphere at the recording sessions:

January, cold days, Ljubljana was gloomy and without sun... Miles away from home, friends, families... from Belgrade! In Ljubljana we knew almost no one. There was no relaxing with friends outside the band. Sequestered and reliant on one another within the band, we all suffered from some sort of depression [...] Turning inwards, I started to isolate myself inside my own vicious circle, finding consolation in alcohol! Spirits, brandy or Vecchia Romagna were increasingly my only company before and after sleep. I ate very little and [...] soon I turned into a ghost!

The atmosphere in the studio was completely miserable. We worked mostly in the afternoon and at night. [...]

At the time, we all noticed Rajko started using heroin together with his girlfriend from Belgrade. [...] Since he couldn't get his hands on it regularly in Ljubljana he needed some substitute for that dangerous drug. He found an alternative in cough syrup Sanotus, which contained codeine. [...] It was available over-the-counter in SR Slovenia, so at one point he emptied all the chemist's shops in the city, cramming the stuff in his hotel room. I tried that syrup too, I drank half a bottle, and afterwards felt numb and sleepy. [...]

Vicko, who was away serving his army stint, was [...] replaced by Vlada, Vlajko Golubović. [...] On the recording, I personally missed Vicko very much. [...] Vlajko was a great drummer, but he and I [as part of the same rhythm section] were worlds apart [when it comes to musical sensibilities], and this is definitely evident on the recordings.

Bora was in his darkest lyrical phase.

After completing the recording sessions in Ljubljana, the album's producer Kornelije Kovač and band members (minus guitarist Bajagić) went to London to mix the material. Bajagić decided not travel to London ostensibly due to feeling that he's "not needed for that part of the process since Kovač has it covered". Instead, while the rest of the band was in London, Bajagić went back home to Belgrade where, in his small Kosovska Street rental apartment using a 4-channel TASCAM Portastudio cassette recorder he had borrowed from Kovač, he proceeded to record about a third of the material for a potential solo side project he had tentatively been working on. Additionally, he also put together a supporting band and booked a debut show in April 1984 at Belgrade's Dom Sindikata before also adding a prior warm-up club gig at Zagreb's Kulušić. His album, named Pozitivna geografija and also produced by Kornelije Kovač, would soon be completed and released by PGP-RTB and met with extremely positive critical and commercial notices.

== Track listing ==
| No. | Title | Lyrics | Music | Length |
|---|---|---|---|---|
| 1. | "Kazablanka" ("Casablanca") | B. Đorđević | M. Bajagić | 3:36 |
| 2. | "Muzičari koji piju" ("The Hard-Drinking Musicians") | M. Bajagić | M. Bajagić | 2:16 |
| 3. | "Mangupi vam kvare dete" ("Bad Boys Are Spoiling Your Kid") | B. Đorđević | M. Bajagić | 1:58 |
| 4. | "Džukele će me dokusuriti" ("Bastards Will Be the Death of Me") | B. Đorđević | R. Kojić, M. Bajagić | 3:16 |
| 5. | "Nemoj da kažeš mome dečku" ("Don't Tell My Boyfriend") | B. Đorđević | M. Aleksić, B. Đorđević | 3:37 |
| 6. | "Gluposti" ("Stupid Things") | B. Đorđević | B. Đorđević | 3:11 |
| 7. | "Priča o Žiki Živcu" ("The Story of Žika the Nerve") | B. Đorđević | M. Aleksić | 3:00 |
| 8. | "Besni psi" ("Mad Dogs") | B. Đorđević | B. Đorđević | 4:17 |
| 9. | "Kad hodaš" ("When You Walk") | M. Bajagić | M. Bajagić | 4:01 |
| 10. | "Minut ćutanja" ("Minute of Silence") | B. Đorđević | R. Kojić | 3:20 |
| 11. | "Ravnodušan prema plaču" ("Unmoved by Crying") | B. Đorđević | B. Đorđević | 3:15 |

== Reception and controversy ==
Immediately after the album's release, state censorship board declared the songs "Mangupi vam kvare dete" and "Besni psi" "ethically unacceptable". "Besni psi" in particular caused a protracted international scandal. Due to its lyrics "Grčki šverceri, arapski studenti, negativni elementi, maloletni delikventi i besni psi" ("Greek smugglers, Arab students, negative elements, juvenile delinquents, and rabid dogs"), the embassies of three Arab countries as well as Zaire protested, complaining that songwriter Bora Đorđević had equated foreign students in SFR Yugoslavia with rabid dogs. The Yugoslav Ministry of Culture ordered an expert analysis of the song.

With a somewhat darker atmosphere, the album was not nearly successful as Riblja Čorba's previous albums, bringing only one hit, Momčilo Bajagić's gentle ballad "Kad hodaš".

=== Promotional tour and personnel changes ===
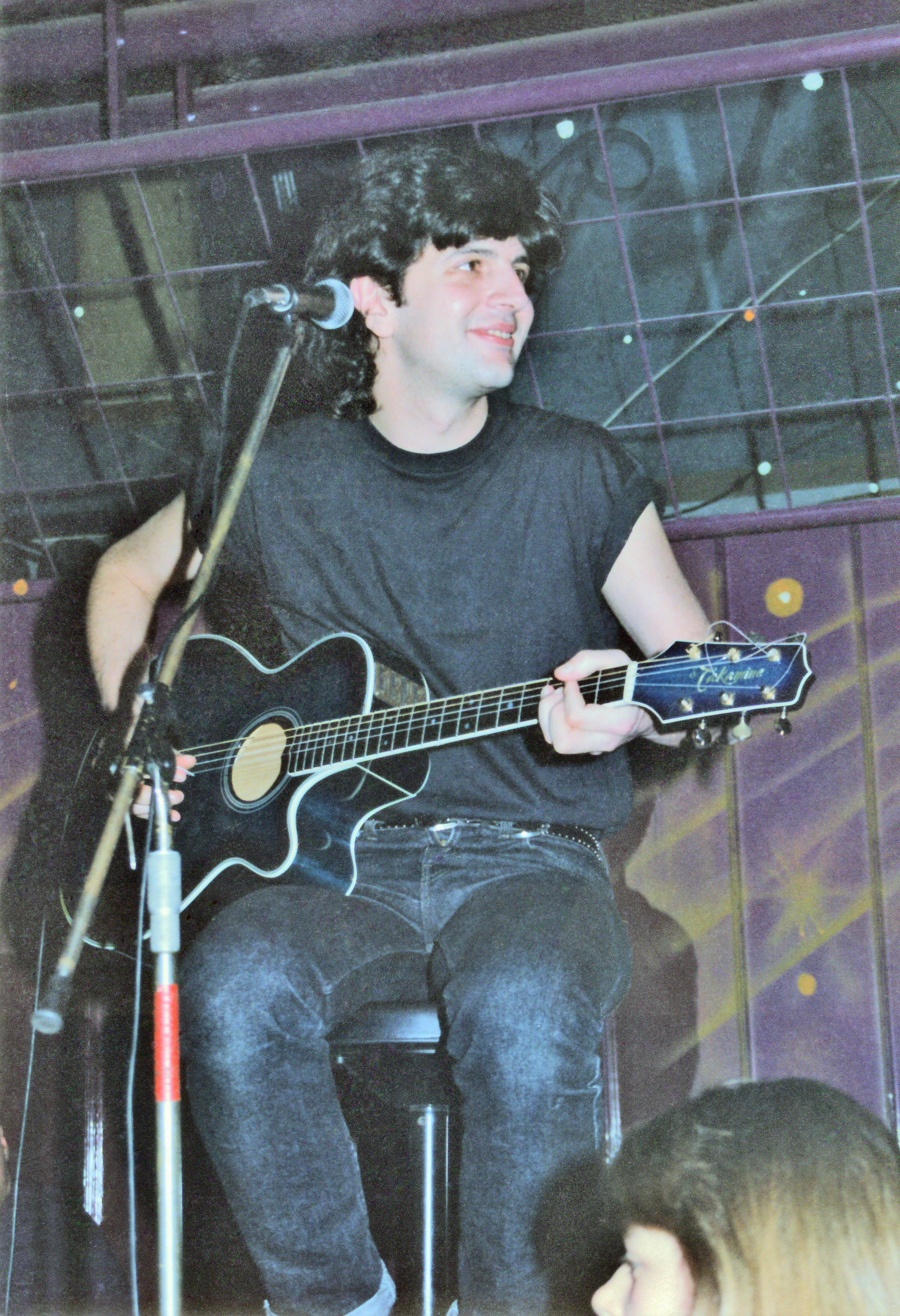
For different reasons, Riblja Čorba guitarists Momčilo Bajagić and Rajko Kojić were dismissed several months after the Večeras vas zabavljaju muzičari koji piju release.

Post album release, Bajagić—still officially a Riblja Čorba member though increasingly on the outs with the rest of the band as a consequence of the overwhelmingly positive public reaction to his side project, Pozitivna geografija, as well as bandleader Đorđević raising doubts about Bajagić's focus—participated in Večeras vas zabavljaju muzičari koji piju promotional activities and toured with the band in May and June 1984. As his status in Riblja Čorba became untenable, during summer 1984, he ended up essentially being kicked out of the band amid acrimony over his refusal to cut his Mljet vacation short and join them for several summer gigs in Greece. Bajagić reportedly learned about his dismissal from a newspaper report, specifically while returning from the Mljet island by boat and buying a copy of Politika ekspres in Dubrovnik.

Though for different reasons, the band's other lead guitarist, Rajko Kojić, was also expelled from Riblja Čorba at the same time. His dismissal from the band, however, had to do with his increased drug use that began affecting his on-stage performance. Kojić's and Bajagić's immediate replacements at Riblja Čorba were Džindžer Božinović and Zoran Dašić.

== Legacy ==
The album was polled in 1998 as the 80th on the list of 100 greatest Yugoslav rock and pop albums in the book YU 100: najbolji albumi jugoslovenske rok i pop muzike (YU 100: The Best albums of Yugoslav pop and rock music).

In 2006, the song "Kad hodaš" was ranked #4 on the B92 Top 100 Domestic Songs List.

== Personnel ==
- Bora Đorđević - vocals
- Rajko Kojić - guitar
- Momčilo Bajagić - guitar
- Miša Aleksić - bass guitar
- Vladimir Golubović - drums

=== Additional personnel ===
- Kornelije Kovač - keyboards, producer
- Bob Painter - recorded by
- Aco Razbornik - recorded by
