= Ujed za dušu =

Studio album by Riblja Čorba
- Released: February 16, 1987
- Recorded: 26 December 1986 – February 1987
- Studio: Studio V PGP-RTB, Belgrade
- Genre: Hard rock
- Length: 35:42
- Label: PGP-RTB
- Producer: Kornelije Kovač

Riblja Čorba chronology
Osmi nervni slom (1986)	Ujed za dušu (1987)	Riblja Čorba 10 (1987)

Ujed za dušu (trans. Soul Bite) is the eighth studio album by Serbian and former Yugoslav rock band Riblja Čorba, released in 1987.

== Background ==
Except "Član mafije", which criticized the League of Communists of Yugoslavia, the album is unusually devoid of political messages for Riblja Čorba. The hits included Riblja Čorba's first cover, "Zadnji voz za Čačak" (cover of The Monkees' "Last Train to Clarksville"), their biggest all-time hit "Kad padne noć (Upomoć)" and a ballad "Da, to sam ja".

The songs "Nesrećnice nije te sramota" and "Zašto kuče arlauče" were recorded for the album but were released only as a limited edition 7-inch included with the first 1000 copies of the album.

== Album cover ==
The album cover was designed by Jugoslav Vlahović.

== Track listing ==
No.	Title	Lyrics	Music	Length
1.	"Svirao je Dejvid Bovi" ("David Bowie Was Playing")	B. Đorđević, N. Čuturilo	M. Aleksić, B. Đorđević	3:08
2.	"Kada padne noć (Upomoć)" ("When the Night Falls (Help)")	B. Đorđević	B. Đorđević	4:24
3.	"Ne spavaj gola" ("Don't Sleep Naked")	B. Đorđević	B. Đorđević	3:24
4.	"Zadnji voz za Čačak" ("Last Train to Čačak")	B. Đorđević	T. Boyce, B. Hart	2:45
5.	"Crvena su dugmad pritisnuta" ("Red Buttons Are Pressed")	B. Đorđević	N. Čuturilo	4:19
6.	"Lud sto posto" ("One Hundred Percent Crazy")	B. Đorđević	M. Aleksić	4:15
7.	"Propala noć" ("Wasted Night")	B. Đorđević	N. Čuturilo	3:23
8.	"Član mafije" ("Mafia Member")	B. Đorđević	B. Đorđević	3:04
9.	"Neke čudne materije" ("Some Strange Substances")	B. Đorđević	V. Božinović	2:24
10.	"Da, to sam ja" ("Yes, It's Me")	B. Đorđević	N. Čuturilo	4:36

== Personnel ==
- Bora Đorđević - vocals
- Vidoja Božinović - lead guitar
- Nikola Čuturilo - rhythm guitar
- Miroslav Milatović - drums
- Miša Aleksić - bass guitar

=== Additional personnel ===
- Kornelije Kovač - keyboards, producer
- Jelenko Milanković - percussion
- Rade Ercegovac - engineer
- Zoran Ivković - engineer

== Covers ==
- The song "Kada padne noć (Upomoć)" was sampled by the Serbian hip hop band Sha Ila, in the song of the same title ("Kada padne noć"), released on their 2003 album Multiplay.
