= U ime naroda =

Live album by Riblja Čorba
- Released: July 2, 1982
- Recorded: Belgrade; April 11, 1982
- Venue: Pionir Hall
- Genre: Hard rock
- Length: 44:11
- Label: PGP-RTB
- Producer: Dragan Vukićević

Riblja Čorba chronology
Mrtva priroda (1981)	U ime naroda (1982)	Buvlja pijaca (1982)

U ime naroda (trans. In the Name of the People) is the first live album by the influential Serbia/former Yugoslav rock band Riblja Čorba. The album was recorded on the band's concert held on April 11, 1982 in Pionir Hall in Belgrade.

The album title alludes to the censorship the band's leader Bora Đorđević fought at the time of album release.

The album was polled in 1998 as the 85th on the list of 100 greatest Yugoslav rock and pop albums in the book YU 100: najbolji albumi jugoslovenske rok i pop muzike (YU 100: The Best albums of Yugoslav pop and rock music).

== Album cover ==
The album cover was designed by Jugoslav Vlahović.

== Track listing ==
All lyrics written by Đorđević

No.	Title	Music	Length
1.	"Vidiš da sam gadan kad sam tebe gladan" ("You See That I'm Nasty When I'm Hungry For You")	R. Kojić	3:14
2.	"Prevara" ("Betrayal")	M. Aleksić, M. Milatović	3:35
3.	"Egoista" ("Egoist")	B. Đorđević	2:09
4.	"Ostaću slobodan" ("I'll Stay Free")	M. Aleksić	3:09
5.	"Dva dinara druže" ("Two Dinars, Comrade")	M. Bajagić	5:46
6.	"Nemoj, srećo, nemoj danas" ("Don't, Honey, Not Today")	M. Bajagić	4:10
7.	"Evo ti za taksi" ("Here's Some for the Cab")	M. Bajagić	3:27
8.	"Ostani đubre do kraja" ("Stay Scum to the End")	B. Đorđević, M. Aleksić	3:27
9.	"Vetar duva, duva, duva" ("The Wind Blows, Blows, Blows")	B. Đorđević	1:44
10.	"Lutka sa naslovne strane" ("Front Cover Doll")	B. Đorđević	4:32
11.	"Neću da ispadnem životinja" ("I Don't Want to Look Like an Animal")	B. Đorđević	3:52
12.	"Volim, volim, volim, volim žene" ("I Love, Love, Love, Love, Women")	B. Đorđević	3:30

== Personnel ==
- Bora Đorđević - vocals
- Rajko Kojić - guitar
- Momčilo Bajagić - guitar
- Miša Aleksić - bass guitar
- Miroslav Milatović - drums

=== Additional personnel ===
- Dragan Vukićević - producer, recorded by
- Draža Sužnjević - recorded by

== Reception ==
Professional ratings
Review scores
Source	Rating
Džuboks	(favorable)
Rock 82	(favorable)

U ime naroda sold more than 160,000 copies, becoming the best-selling live album in the history of Yugoslav rock music.

== Legacy ==
In 1987, in YU legende uživo (YU Legends Live), a special publication by Rock magazine, U ime naroda was pronounced one of 12 best Yugoslav live albums. In 1998, the album was polled as the 85th on the list of 100 greatest Yugoslav rock and pop albums in the book YU 100: najbolji albumi jugoslovenske rok i pop muzike (YU 100: The Best albums of Yugoslav pop and rock music).
