= Lutka sa naslovne strane =

Single by Riblja Čorba
- B-side: "On i njegov BMW"
- Released: December 12, 1978
- Recorded: 1978
- Genre: Hard rock
- Length: 3:06
- Label: PGP-RTB
- Songwriter: Bora Đorđević

Riblja Čorba singles chronology
"Lutka sa naslovne strane" (1978)	"Rock 'n' Roll za kućni savet" (1979)

"Lutka sa naslovne strane" ("Front Cover Doll") is the debut single from the influential Serbian and former Yugoslav rock band Riblja Čorba.

The song, a hard rock ballad about a fame-hungry model, was originally written during the time Riblja Čorba leader Bora Đorđević was a member of the acoustic rock band Suncokret. The song led to a clash between Đorđević and other members, which caused Đorđević to leave Suncokret and join Rani Mraz. After only three months spent in Rani Mraz, Đorđević left the band and with the members of the band SOS formed Riblja Čorba, which released "Lutka sa naslovne strane" as their debut single. On the song recording jazz trumpeter Stjepko Gut played the piano.

The song was performed by Đorđević and Arsen Dedić on the live album Arsen & Bora Čorba Unplugged `87.

In 2006 the song was ranked #12 on the B92 Top 100 Domestic Songs list.

B-side features song "On i njegov BMW" (trans. "He and his BMW").

== Track listing ==
1. "Lutka sa naslovne strane" - 3:06
2. "On i njegov BMW" - 2:46

== Personnel ==
- Bora Đorđević - vocals, acoustic guitar
- Rajko Kojić - guitar
- Miša Aleksić - bass guitar
- Vicko Milatović - drums

=== Guest musicians ===
- Stjepko Gut - piano
