= Mrtva priroda =

Studio album by Riblja Čorba
- Released: November 3, 1981
- Recorded: 1 September – October 1981
- Studio: Maison Rouge Studio, London
- Genre: Hard rock; heavy metal
- Length: 32:18
- Label: PGP-RTB
- Producer: John McCoy

Riblja Čorba chronology
Pokvarena mašta i prljave strasti (1981)	Mrtva priroda (1981)	U ime naroda (1982)

Mrtva priroda (trans. Still Life) is the third studio album from Serbian and former Yugoslav rock band Riblja Čorba, released in 1981.

In 1998, the album was polled as the 19th on the list of 100 greatest Yugoslav rock and pop albums in the book YU 100: najbolji albumi jugoslovenske rok i pop muzike (YU 100: The Best albums of Yugoslav pop and rock music). In 2015, the album was pronounced the 22nd on the list of 100 greatest Yugoslav albums published by Croatian edition of Rolling Stone.

== Background and recording ==
For the first time, a Riblja Čorba album featured a song written entirely by the guitarist Momčilo Bajagić, "Ja sam se ložio na tebe". Nevertheless, Riblja Čorba frontman Bora Đorđević remained the band's main author, with six songs written by him.

The album was produced by John McCoy. In his 2011 book, Šta je pesnik hteo da kaže, Đorđević recalls how the band decided to hire McCoy:

[PGP-RTB executive] Stanko Terzić knew he had the goose that lays golden eggs on his hands, so the label paid for our trip to London to find a producer as well as a studio to record in. [...] As soon as we landed at Heathrow, we bought copies of two [...] most important music magazines in the world—New Musical Express and Melody Maker. We looked at the charts. Both magazines had Gillan's latest album on top. "Released by Virgin Records, produced by John McCoy". 'That's our producer', we decided.

Đorđević also states that the band was offered to record the album in one of the studios where Deep Purple had recorded Deep Purple In Rock, but turned it down, as PGP-RTB had just bought new equipment for their Studio V, so McCoy and Tony Taverner, who was in charge of recording, travelled to Belgrade.

Đorđević states that he did not want to put "Vetar duva, duva, duva", a short humorous song about cannabis, on the album, but was persuaded to do so by the rest of the members.

The next day, when we came to the studio, John waited for us in [...] kafana. Here's the trick: in the absence of grass, which would destroy our concentration, the English guy, in order to achieve the real atmosphere, decided to get us drunk. [...] After two or three hours of preparations, the jolly company went into the studio and started to sing.

== Album cover ==
The album cover was designed by Jugoslav Vlahović.

== Track listing ==
No.	Title	Lyrics	Music	Length
1.	"Volim, volim, volim, volim žene" ("I Love, Love, Love, Love Women")	B. Đorđević	B. Đorđević	2:20
2.	"Ne veruj ženi koja puši Drinu bez filtera (Ostavi je)" ("Don't Believe a Woman that Smokes Non-Filter Drina (Leave Her)")	B. Đorđević	M. Bajagić	3:22
3.	"Ja sam se ložio na tebe" ("I Had Hots for You")	M. Bajagić	M. Bajagić	3:26
4.	"Prevara" ("Deceit")	B. Đorđević	M. Aleksić, V. Milatović	3:10
5.	"Pobeći negde" ("Run Away Somewhere")	B. Đorđević	R. Kojić	5:18
6.	"Pekar, lekar, apotekar" ("Baker, Doctor, Pharmacist")	B. Đorđević	B. Đorđević	2:48
7.	"Odlazak u grad" ("Leaving for the City")	B. Đorđević	M. Aleksić, M. Bajagić	2:48
8.	"Vetar duva, duva, duva" ("The Wind Blows, Blows, Blows")	B. Đorđević	B. Đorđević	2:33
9.	"Na zapadu ništa novo" ("All Quiet On The Western Front")	B. Đorđević	B. Đorđević	2:33
10.	"Neću da ispadnem životinja" ("I Don't Want to Look Like an Animal")	B. Đorđević	B. Đorđević	3:40

=== 2006 CD reissue bonus track ===
No.	Title	Length
11.	"Intervju sa Borom Đorđevićem" ("An Interview with Bora Đorđević")	37:09

== Personnel ==
- Bora Đorđević - vocals
- Rajko Kojić - guitar
- Momčilo Bajagić - guitar
- Miša Aleksić - bass guitar
- Miroslav Milatović - drums

=== Guest musicians ===
- Kornelije Kovač - keyboards

=== Additional personnel ===
- John McCoy - producer
- Tony Taverner - recorded by

== Reception ==
Three weeks after the album was released it sold 100,000 copies, which made Mrtva Priroda the fastest-selling album in the history of Yugoslav rock music. By the end of the year it sold more than 450,000 copies. Several songs became hits: "Neću da ispadnem životinja", "Pekar, lekar, apotekar", "Volim, volim žene" and "Na zapadu ništa novo".

=== "Na zapadu ništa novo" scandal ===
"Na zapadu ništa novo" (named after Erich Maria Remarque's novel All Quiet on the Western Front) was the band's first song with overt political undertones.

As a result, Yugoslav Socialist Youth League's Bosnia-Herzegovina branch (SSOBiH) demanded Mrtva priroda be banned because of its lyrics "za ideale ginu budale" ("only fools die for their ideals") and "kreteni dižu bune i ginu" ("idiots starting uprisings and getting killed"). Arriving to Sarajevo in late February 1982 for a show at Skenderija as part of the album tour, Đorđević was forced into writing a public explanation for these specific lyrics that were deemed problematic. Still afraid that performing the song at the show might result in legal prosecution by the local communist authorities, the show organizers also made him sign a liability waiver in which he explicitly assumes any and all responsibility in a potential legal process.

== Legacy ==
In 1998, the album was polled in 1998 as the 19th on the list of 100 greatest Yugoslav rock and pop albums in the book YU 100: najbolji albumi jugoslovenske rok i pop muzike (YU 100: The Best albums of Yugoslav pop and rock music).

In 2015, the album was pronounced the 22nd on the list of 100 greatest Yugoslav albums published by Croatian edition of Rolling Stone. The magazine wrote:

The new wave was in the attack, but, alongside it, Belgrade hard rock band Riblja Čorba was also in the attack. In 1981, their third studio album, Mrtva priroda, was released, with which the band, led by charismatic Bora Đorđević, managed to beat even Bijelo Dugme's album sales. [...] Mrtva priroda is one of the rare albums of the Yugoslav scene from which literally every song became a hit [...] the message, the music and the emotions of the band matched with what the youth wanted at that point. In terms of creativity, Mrtva priroda was the peak. All of the band's later releases were compared with that album, on which the music and Đorđević's lyrics were in perfect balance [...]

In 2015 Mrtva priroda album cover was ranked the 8th on the list of 100 Greatest Album Covers of Yugoslav Rock published by web magazine Balkanrock.

=== Covers ===
- Serbian girl group Aska included passages from "Volim, volim, volim, volim žene" and "Pekar, lekar, apotekar" into the medley "Koktel" ("Coctail") on their 1982 album Disco Rock.
- Serbian hardcore punk band Sick Mother Fakers released a cover of "Odlazak u grad" on their 1998 album Lako ćemo.
- Serbian punk rock band Six Pack released a cover of "Na zapadu ništa novo" on their 2000 album Minut ćutanja.
- Serbian pop punk band Lude Krawe released a cover of "Vetar duva, duva, duva" (alongside a cover of song "Dva dinara, druže" from Riblja Čorba's album Pokvarena mašta i prljave strasti) on their 2007 cover album Sve tuđe.
