= Rajko Kojić =

- Rajko Kojić in 1983

Background information
- Born: 12 April 1956; Jarkovac, PR Serbia, Yugoslavia
- Died: 11 April 1997 (aged 40) Belgrade, Serbia, FR Yugoslavia
- Genres: Hard rock; rock and roll
- Occupations: Musician, Songwriter
- Instrument: Guitar
- Years active: 1973 –1997
- Labels: PGP RTB, Jugoton
- Formerly of: SOS; Riblja Čorba

Radislav "Rajko" Kojić (Serbian Cyrillic: Радислав-Рајко Којић; 12 April 1956 – 11 April 1997) was a Serbian guitarist best known for his work with band Riblja Čorba.

== Biography ==
Rajko Kojić was born on 12 April 1956 in Jarkovac. He started dealing with music, when he was in high school, when he started to play guitar.

Kojić started his career in 1973 as the guitarist for the band Demoni from Jarkovac. As the band did not have a bass guitarist Kojić would sometimes play bass guitar. In 1974, he joined band MBG. He played only three concerts with MBG before moving to Belgrade at the end of 1975. In 1976, Kojić formed band MBG II with another former MBG member Borivoje Knežević. Kojić soon met Momčilo Bajagić with whom he formed band Glogov Kolac, which performed only once in Uljma. After Glogov Kolac disbanded, Kojić joined band SOS led by Miša Aleksić. In 1978, SOS members Kojić, Aleksić and Vicko Milatović formed Riblja Čorba with a former Rani Mraz member Bora Đorđević. This lineup of the band made enormous success with their debut single "Lutka sa naslovne strane" and soon, on Kojić's suggestion, Bajagić joined the band.

In 1983, Kojić released his solo EP Ne budi me bez razloga (Don't Wake Me up without a Good Reason). Other Riblja Čorba members made guest appearances on this EP. EP also featured Laza Ristovski on keyboard. In 1984, both Kojić and Bajagić left the band and were replaced by Vidoja Božinović and Nikola Čuturilo. After leaving Riblja Čorba, Kojić was involved in only few projects: He made a guest appearance on Bajaga i Instruktori album Jahači magle in 1986, wrote part of the folk band Svilen Konac's song "Sad ljubavi više nema" in 1987 and made a guest appearance on Indijanci self-titled album in 1995.

In 1984, Kojić began using heroin and his addiction led to him being expelled from the band. He made attempts to quit, but was unsuccessful. In spring of 1997, he was transferred in very poor health to a hospital in Belgrade where he died a few weeks later, on 11 April at the age of 40. He was buried in his native village of Jarkovac.

== Discography ==
=== Riblja Čorba ===
==== Studio albums ====
- Kost u grlu (1979)
- Pokvarena mašta i prljave strasti (1981)
- Mrtva priroda (1981)
- Buvlja pijaca (1982)
- Večeras vas zabavljaju muzičari koji piju (1984)

==== Live albums ====
- U ime naroda (1982)
- Beograd 1981 (2021)

==== Singles ====
- "Lutka sa naslovne strane" / "On i njegov BMW" (1978)
- "Rock 'n' Roll za kućni savet" / "Valentino iz restorana" (1979)
- "Nazad u prljavi veliki grad" / "Mirno spavaj" (1980)
- "Kad hodaš" / "Priča o Žiki Živcu" (1984)

=== Solo ===
==== EPs ====
- Ne budi me bez razloga (1983)
