= Osmi nervni slom =

Studio album by Riblja Čorba
- Released: 4 February 1986
- Recorded: December 1985 – January 1986
- Studio: Studio V PGP-RTB, Belgrade
- Genre: Hard rock; heavy metal
- Length: 36:21
- Label: PGP-RTB
- Producer: Kornelije Kovač

Riblja Čorba chronology
Istina (1985)	Osmi nervni slom (1986)	Ujed za dušu (1987)

Osmi nervni slom (trans. Eighth Nervous Breakdown) is the seventh studio album released by Serbian and former Yugoslav rock band Riblja Čorba in 1986.

The album was produced by Kornelije Kovač, who also played keyboards on the album recording. The song "Amsterdam" featured British reggae musician Eddy Grant on vocals. The ballad "Prokleto sam" featured actress Ana Kostovska on backing vocals. "Jedan čovek" featured Jova Maljoković on saxophone.

The album was polled in 1998 as the 83rd on the list of 100 greatest Yugoslav rock and pop albums in the book YU 100: najbolji albumi jugoslovenske rok i pop muzike (YU 100: The Best albums of Yugoslav pop and rock music).

== Album cover ==
The album cover was designed by Vladeta Andrić, and is one of two Riblja Čorba album covers which were not designed by Jugoslav Vlahović (the other one being Koza nostra cover).

== Track listing ==
No.	Title	Lyrics	Music	Length
1.	"Nemoj da ideš mojom ulicom" ("Don't Walk Along My Street")	B. Đorđević	B. Đorđević	2:36
2.	"Južna Afrika '85 (Ja ću da pevam)" ("South Africa 85 (I'm Gonna Sing)")	B. Đorđević	B. Đorđević	3:25
3.	"Jedan čovek" ("One Man")	B. Đorđević	V. Božinović	4:30
4.	"Ljuti Rock 'n' Roll" ("Red Hot Rock 'n' Roll")	B. Đorđević	N. Čuturilo	2:57
5.	"Sutra me probudi" ("Wake Me Up Tomorrow")	B. Đorđević	N. Čuturilo	4:13
6.	"Amsterdam (feat. Eddy Grant)"	B. Đorđević	M. Aleksić	3:44
7.	"Tu nema Boga, nema pravde" ("There's no God here, There's no Justice")	B. Đorđević	B. Đorđević	3:04
8.	"Crno je dole" ("It's Dark Down There")	B. Đorđević	B. Đorđević	3:18
9.	"Cava" ("Pussy")	B. Đorđević	M. Aleksić	3:32
10.	"Prokleto sam" ("So Goddamn Alone")	B. Đorđević	V. Božinović	5:02

== Personnel ==
- Bora Đorđević - vocals
- Vidoja Božinović - guitar
- Nikola Čuturilo - guitar
- Miša Aleksić - bass guitar
- Vicko Milatović - drums

=== Guest musicians ===
- Eddy Grant - vocals (on "Amsterdam")
- Ana Kostovska - backing vocals (on "Prokleto sam")
- Jova Maljoković - saxophone (on "Jedan čovek")

=== Additional personnel ===
- Kornelije Kovač - keyboards, producer
- Tahir Duraklić - recorded by
