= Buvlja pijaca =

Studio album by Riblja Čorba
- Released: October 29, 1982
- Recorded: 1981–1982
- Studios: Studio V PGP-RTB, Belgrade
- Genre: Hard rock
- Length: 37:52
- Label: PGP-RTB
- Producer: John McCoy

Riblja Čorba chronology
U ime naroda (1982)	Buvlja pijaca (1982)	Večeras vas zabavljaju muzičari koji piju (1984)

Buvlja pijaca (trans. Flea Market) is the fourth studio album from Serbian and former Yugoslav rock band Riblja Čorba, released in 1982.

The album is the second Riblja Čorba album produced by John McCoy.

The album was polled in 1998 as the 64th on the list of 100 greatest Yugoslav rock and pop albums in the book YU 100: najbolji albumi jugoslovenske rok i pop muzike (YU 100: The Best albums of Yugoslav pop and rock music).

== Album cover ==
The album cover features the iconic kaiju monster Godzilla blowing his signature atomic breath on King Kong. It was designed by Jugoslav Vlahović and is the only Riblja Čorba cover which does not feature their logo.

== Track listing ==
No.	Title	Lyrics	Music	Length
1.	"Draga, ne budi peder" ("Darling, don't be a faggot")	B. Đorđević	V. Milatović, B. Đorđević	3:00
2.	"U dva će čistači odneti đubre" ("At two, garbage collectors will take away the trash")	B. Đorđević	B. Đorđević	3:43
3.	"Baby, Baby, I Don't Wanna Cry"	M. Bajagić	M. Bajagić	3:22
4.	"Slušaj sine, obriši sline" ("Listen son, wipe your nose")	B. Đorđević	B. Đorđević	2:48
5.	"Kad ti se na glavu sruši čitav svet" ("When the whole world crashes on your head")	B. Đorđević	R. Kojić	4:57
6.	"Ja ratujem sam" ("I wage war alone")	B. Đorđević	M. Aleksić	2:35
7.	"Pravila, pravila" ("Rules, rules")	B. Đorđević	M. Bajagić	6:18
8.	"Kako je lepo biti glup" ("How nice it is to be stupid")	B. Đorđević	B. Đorđević	2:17
9.	"Neću da živim u bloku 65" ("I don't want to live in Blok 65")	B. Đorđević	M. Aleksić, M. Bajagić	3:54
10.	"Dobro jutro" ("Good morning")	B. Đorđević	M. Aleksić, M. Bajagić	4:36

== Personnel ==
- Bora Đorđević - vocals
- Rajko Kojić - guitar
- Momčilo Bajagić - guitar
- Miša Aleksić - bass guitar
- Miroslav Milatović - drums

=== Additional personnel ===
- Kornelije Kovač - keyboard
- Rešad Jahja - cello
- Petar Jovanović - cello
- Miroljub Aranđelović - clarinet
- Miroslav Blažević - trumpet
- Asan Selimović - tuba
- Miomir Maksimčev - viola
- Petar Mladenović - viola
- Geza Balaž - violin
- Gordana Todorović - violin
- Miloš Lazarević - violin
- Miroljub Milošević - violin
- Stojan Grbić - violin
- Žarko Mićković - violin
- John McCoy - producer
- Tony Taverner - recorded by
- Jovan Stojanović - engineer

== Reception and legacy ==
The album brought a number of hit songs: ironic love songs such as "Draga ne budi peder", "U dva će čistači odneti đubre", "Dobro jutro" plus political and satirical songs "Slušaj sine, obriši sline", "Kako je lepo biti glup" (inspired by Đorđević's service in Yugoslav People's Army), "Pravila, pravila", "Kad ti se na glavu sruši čitav svet" and "Ja ratujem sam". It sold more than 250,000 copies, which was less than expected, considering the sales of previous records.

The songs "U dva će čistači odneti đubre", "Kad ti se na glavu sruši čitav svet", "Ja ratujem sam", "Pravila, pravila", "Kako je lepo biti glup" and "Dobro jutro" appeared in Mića Milošević's 1982 movie A Tight Spot.

In 1998, Buvlja pijaca was polled the 64th on the list of 100 greatest Yugoslav rock and pop albums in the book YU 100: najbolji albumi jugoslovenske rok i pop muzike (YU 100: The Best albums of Yugoslav pop and rock music).

In 2015 Buvlja pijaca album cover was ranked 57th on the list of 100 Greatest Album Covers of Yugoslav Rock published by web magazine Balkanrock.
