= Nikola Čuturilo =

Serbian musician (born 1962)

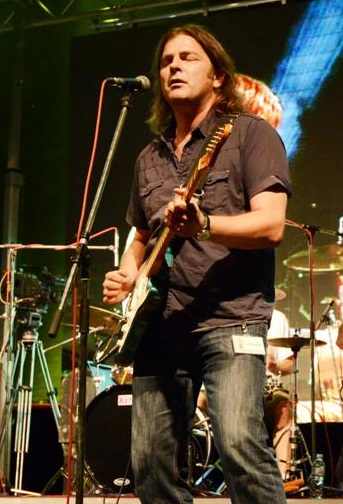
- Nikola Čuturilo performing at Rockwood Festival in 2013

Background information
- Also known as: Čutura
- Born: 9 July 1962 (age 64); Banatski Karlovac, PR Serbia, FPR Yugoslavia
- Origin: Belgrade, Serbia
- Genres: Pop rock; hard rock; heavy metal
- Occupations: Musician, songwriter
- Instruments: Guitar, vocals
- Years active: 1976 – present
- Labels: PGP-RTB, Jugoton, ZKP RTLJ, Komuna Belgrade, PGP-RTS

Nikola Čuturilo (Serbian Cyrillic: Никола Чутурило; born 9 July 1962), also known as Čutura (Чутура, literally "canteen") is a Serbian rock musician. He is known as a guitarist for the band Riblja Čorba, as well as for his solo work.

== Biography ==
=== Early career ===
Čuturilo started his career as a teenager, in 1976, playing as a guitarist for the band Kredit, which also featured Igor Popović (who would later become frontman of Jakarta, vocals), Časlav Stanković (guitar), Srđan Đurić (bass guitar) and Milan Bubalo (drums). However, Kredit soon disbanded (Stanković, Đurić and Bubalo would later form Laki Pingvini), and in 1977, Čuturilo and Popović, with Srđan Đurić (bass guitar), Slobodan Đurišić (later would play in Mama Co Co, Točak Band, Spori Ritam Bend and YU grupa, drums) and Saša Lokner (later would play in Bajaga i Instruktori, keyboards), formed the band Paviljon.

After a year spent in Paviljon, Čuturilo became a member of Bicikl. With Bicikl Čuturilo recorded a 7-inch single with songs "Palanačka hronika" ("Small Town Chronicles") and "Dečja pesma" ("Children's Song"), released in 1981. Čuturilo soon had to leave Bicikl due to his army obligations, and after he returned from the army in 1982, he joined Siluete. A year later, Čuturilo moved to the band Zamba, with which he released the album Udarac nisko (Low Punch). In 1984, Zamba disbanded and Čuturilo accepted the invitation from Električni Orgazam leader Srđan Gojković to join Električni Orgazam on tour.

=== Riblja Čorba ===
In September 1984, Čuturilo became a member of Riblja Čorba. He and Vidoja "Džindžer" Božinović became new Riblja Čorba guitar duo, replacing Rajko Kojić and Momčilo Bajagić. Čuturilo spent five years in Riblja Čorba, appearing on studio albums Istina (Truth; 1985), Osmi nervni slom (Eighth Nervous Breakdown; 1986), Ujed za dušu (Soul Bite; 1987) and Priča o ljubavi obično ugnjavi (Talking About Love Is Usually Annoying; 1988).

=== Solo career ===
Čuturilo released his first solo album 9 lakih komada (9 Easy Pieces) in 1988. He wrote all songs on the album, and played guitar and sung on the album recording. Bass guitarists Bodan Arsovski (of Leb i Sol) and Žika Jelić (of YU grupa), drummers Dragoljub Đuričić (of Leb i Sol) and Ivan Ranković (of Ekatarina Velika), keyboardist Saša Lokner (of Bajaga i Instruktori) and guitarist Vlada Negovanovuć (of Tunel) participated in the album recording. Serbian rock and roll pioneer Mile Lojpur appeared as a guest musician in the song "Kad je Lojpur svirao" ("When Lojpur Used to Play"), referring to himself. The album was well received and Čuturilo formed Laki Band (Easy Band) which featured Van Gogh member Zvonimir Đukić (guitar), Dragoljub Đuričić (drums) and Ruž member Dejan Grujić (bass guitar). With Laki Band Čuturilo recorded his second solo album, Raskršće (Crossroads) in 1989. Album was produced by Saša Habić, and, alongside Laki Band members, featured Laza Ristovski and Saša Lokner on keyboards and Dejan Cukić on backing vocals. During the same year, Čuturilo wrote the music for the theatre play Najbolji ludi dan (The Best Crazy Day) which was set at the stage of Nova Gorica theatre. On 14 September 1989 Čuturilo officially left Riblja Čorba and formed the band Oblaci (The Clouds) which featured Nikola Čuturilo's brother Darko (keyboards), Zoran "Baki" Radovanović (drums), Dejan Grujić (bass guitar), and Saša Ranđelović (guitar).

Čuturilo and Oblaci (under the name Čutura & Oblaci) released the album Rekom ljubavi (Down the River of Love) in 1991. The album was produced by Saša Habić and brought a number of radio hits: "Glorija" ("Gloria"), "Pustiću radio" ("I'll Put the Radio On"), "Reka ljubavi" ("River of Love") and "Srećan put" ("Have a Nice Trip"). Album featured Pera Joe, Jelena Galonić, Nenad Milosavljević, Dragi Jelić and Žika Jelić as guest musicians. In 1991, Čuturilo participated at the Retrospective Evening of the Belgrade Spring Festival, performing a cover of Oliver Dragojević's song "Molitva za Magdalenu" ("Prayer for Magdalene") which was released on the album Beograde (Oh, Belgrade).

At the time Čutura & Oblaci went on the Rekom ljubavi tour, Yugoslav wars broke out, and in November 1991, Čuturilo went to London. In London Čuturilo performed mostly in clubs, playing with Paul Rodgers and Micky Moody, among others. In 1998, he recorded his fourth studio album I.D.. The album was recorded in London with David Duncan (bass guitar) and Neil Findlay (drums), produced in Belgrade by Vlada Negovanović, and released through Komuna Belgrade.

In 2006, Čutrilo released his fifth solo album, Nemir (The Unrest), recorded with Dejan Grujić on bass guitar and Blagoje Nedeljković on drums. The album was produced by Block Out leader Nikola Vranjković and released through PGP-RTS.

In 2012, Čuturilo released the album Tu i sad (Here and Now). The album was released both on CD, through PGP-RTS, and available for free download, through timemmachinemusic.org. Tu i sad featured a new version of his 1989 hit "Voli me" ("Love Me"), and a cover of Pop Mašina song "Sećanja" ("Memories"). The album featured guest appearances by Dragi and Žika Jelić of YU grupa, and Bora Đorđević and Vidoja Božinović of Riblja Čorba. The video for the song "Sanjam da je bolje" ("I'm Dreaming that It's Better") from the album featured the actress Gala Videnović. During the same year, Čuturilo wrote the official song of the 2012 European Men's Handball Championship, held in Serbia. The song, entitled "Never Give Up", was sung by Ognjen Radivojević. The same song, with lyrics in Serbian and entitled "Nikad ne zaboravi", was recorded by four children, including Čuturilo's son Danilo, as the official song of the 2012 European Women's Handball Championship, also held in Serbia.

In March 2014, Čuturilo released the single "Neko ka ja" ("Someone Like Me"), widely praised by the media for its political and social lyrics. In December of the same year, Čuturilo released the compilation album Neko kao ja, featuring 17 old songs, and two new ones, the title track and the song "Nije se dogodilo odavno" ("I Hasn't Happened for a Long Time").

In April 2016, several days before Serbian parliamentary election, Čuturilo released a new single, political-oriented "Cirkus stiže" ("The Circus Is Coming"). In March 2017, Čuturilo released another single with political lyrics, "Welcome to the Show".

=== Collaborations ===
In 1986, Čuturilo wrote lyrics for the songs "Blagi bože podigni me" ("Dear God Lift Me Up") and "Još samo ovu noć mi daj" ("Give Me just This more Night") released on Kerber's album Seobe (Migrations). During the same year he wrote lyrics for the song "Obeć'o sam drugu" ("I Promised to My Friend") released on Peđa D' Boy's album Laku noć ti mala (Good Night, Baby). Čuturilo wrote lyrics for six songs released on the YU grupa 1987 album Od zlata jabuka (Golden Apple) and sung backing vocals on the album recording. He also appeared as the author of the lyrics on YU grupa's following album Ima nade (There Is Hope), authoring the lyrics for six songs, including hits "Zaboravi" ("Forget"), "Mornar" ("Sailor") and "Dunavom šibaju vetrovi" ("Winds still Blow by the Danube"). On YU grupa's 1990 album Tragovi (Traces) he was the author of all of the lyrics. Čuturilo wrote music for one song and lyrics for three songs, including the hit "Letnje kiše" ("Summer Rains"), for Dejan Cukić's 1989 album Zajedno (Together), but also cooperated in writing of lyrics for three songs released on the album.

== Legacy ==
The album 9 lakih komada was polled in 1998 as 99th on the list of 100 greatest Yugoslav popular music albums in the book YU 100: najbolji albumi jugoslovenske rok i pop muzike (YU 100: The Best albums of Yugoslav pop and rock music). The same list features two Riblja Čorba albums on which Čuturilo played: Istina, ranked No. 43, and Osmi nervni slom, ranked No. 83.

== Discography ==
=== With Bicikl ===
==== Singles ====
- "Palanačka hronika" / "Dečja pesma" (1981)

=== With Zamba ===
==== Studio albums ====
- Udarac nisko (1983)

==== Singles ====
- "Zašto ideš s njim" / "Nesvesno zaljubljen" (1983)

=== With Riblja Čorba ===
==== Studio albums ====
- Istina (1985)
- Osmi nervni slom (1986)
- Ujed za dušu (1987)
- Priča o ljubavi obično ugnjavi (1988)

==== Live albums ====
- Nema laži, nema prevare – Uživo, Zagreb `85 (1995)
- Od Vardara pa do Triglava (1996)
- Koncert za brigadire (2012)

=== With Arsen Dedić and Bora Đorđević ===
- Arsen & Bora Čorba Unplugged '87 (1987)

=== Solo ===
==== Studio albums ====
- 9 lakih komada (1988)
- Raskršće (1989)
- Rekom ljubavi (1991)
- I.D. (1997)
- Nemir (2006)
- Tu i sad (2012)
- Priče iz depoa (2021)
- 10 na 3,4 (2026)

==== Compilation albums ====
- Neko kao ja (2014)

==== Singles ====
- "Molitva za Magdalenu" (1991)
- "Cirkus stiže" (2016)
- "Dobar dan" (2017)
