= Pogledaj dom svoj, anđele =

Song by Riblja Čorba

from the album Istina
- Released: March 27, 1985
- Recorded: Aquarius Studio, Belgrade; 1985
- Genre: Hard rock
- Length: 3:39
- Label: PGP RTB
- Songwriter: Bora Đorđević
- Producer: John McCoy

"Pogledaj dom svoj, anđele" (title of Thomas Wolfe's novel Look Homeward Angel in Serbian) is a song by the Serbian rock band Riblja Čorba. It was composed by vocalist Bora Đorđević for the band's sixth studio album, Istina. It was voted hit of the year in 1985 by the listeners of Radio Beograd 202 and "song of the decade" in 1990. In 2009, the song was voted the Greatest Domestic Song by the readers of Standard magazine. The song is known for its apocalyptic lyrics, which make it unique among Riblja Čorba songs, which often feature humorous and ironic lyrics, and is considered one of the top rock songs of the former Yugoslav rock scene and one of Riblja Čorba signature songs.
