= Stjepko Gut =

Serbian jazz musician

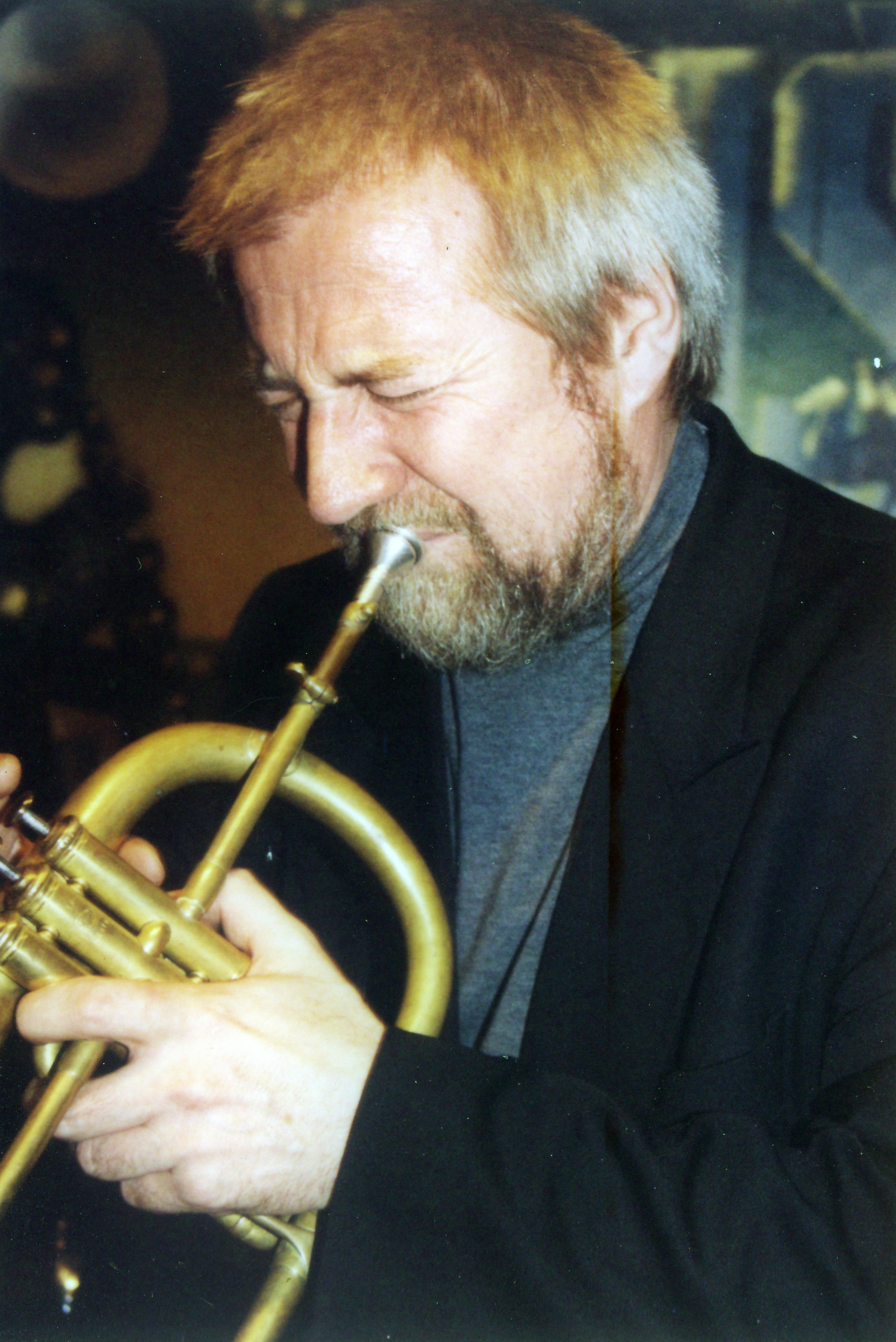
Stjepko Gut

Stjepko Gut (also known as Stepko, Steve Gut, born 15 December 1950 in Ruma) is a Serbian, Belgrade-based jazz musician.

== Biography ==
Gut studied jazz trumpet at the Swiss Jazz School in Bern, Switzerland, and at the Berklee College of Music in Boston, Massachusetts. As a conductor, he won first place in the first Austrian Big Band Competition. He is one of the most famous jazz brass players from Serbia, others being Duško Gojković and Milivoje Marković. He was a member of the Lionel Hampton All Stars for two years, one of two white players at the time in that band. He made international tours, performances and recordings with Clark Terry, Wild Bill Davis, Curtis Fuller, Ed Thigpen, Benny Bailey, Horace Parlan, Mel Lewis, Johhny Griffin, Jimmy Heath, James Moody, Clifford Jordan, Ernie Willkins, Snooky Young, Joe Newman, Wallace Davenport, Jon Faddis, Nicholas Payton, Frank Wess, Alvin Queen, Sal Nistico, Vince Benedetti, Kenny Washington, Charlie Antolini and Dusko Gojkovic. He has been a member of the faculty at the Graz Institut for Jazz since 1984 and a guest professor at the jazz department of Belgrade Music Academy.

-Workshops and masterclasses at numerous universities around the world: Royal Academy Den Haag, Rotterdam Conservatory, New School NYC, USA, University of Arkansas UAPB, Pine Bluff, UNH Durham University, New Hampshire, USA, Paris Conservatory, Amsterdam Jazz Academy, the Netherlands.

-Appeared as a member of the group Trumpet Jazz Summit - 1999 in Marsiac, France - with Clark Terry, Benny Bailey, Jon Faddis, Wynton Marsalis, Terrell Stafford, Roy Hargrove and Nicholas Payton.

== Discography ==
Clark Terry and Louie Bellson "Louie & Clark Expedition 2",-- Lionel Hampton "Live in Switzerland" Vol 1 and 2 - Amos Records—Clark Terry and His Young Titans Of Jazz - Chiaroscuro Records—Steve Gut "Sketches Of Balkan" - Timeless Records Steve Gut "Mr.CT" - Timeless Records—Steve Gut "Steve Gut and RTB Big-Band" - Timeless Records—RTS Big-Band - "Afro Balkan Sketches" - PGP RTB Records—Stjepko Gut "Quartets" - PGP RTB Records—Alvin Queen and Stepko Gut "Nishville" MoJoe Records -- "Something Special" Videorama Records—Louie Bellson -Clark Terry "Louie and Clark Expedition 2" - Percussion Power Records—Five LP´s with the Sextet Markovic-Gut for PGP RTB Records—Sextet Markovic-Gut "Message from Belgrade" Timeless Records—Melissa Stott "Why Now" - Leo Records (2005) -- Melissa Stott "The Picture" Leo Records (2007) -- Charly Antolini Jazz Power "Wow"—Mark Murphy Wem Records --
