= Đorđe Balašević discography =

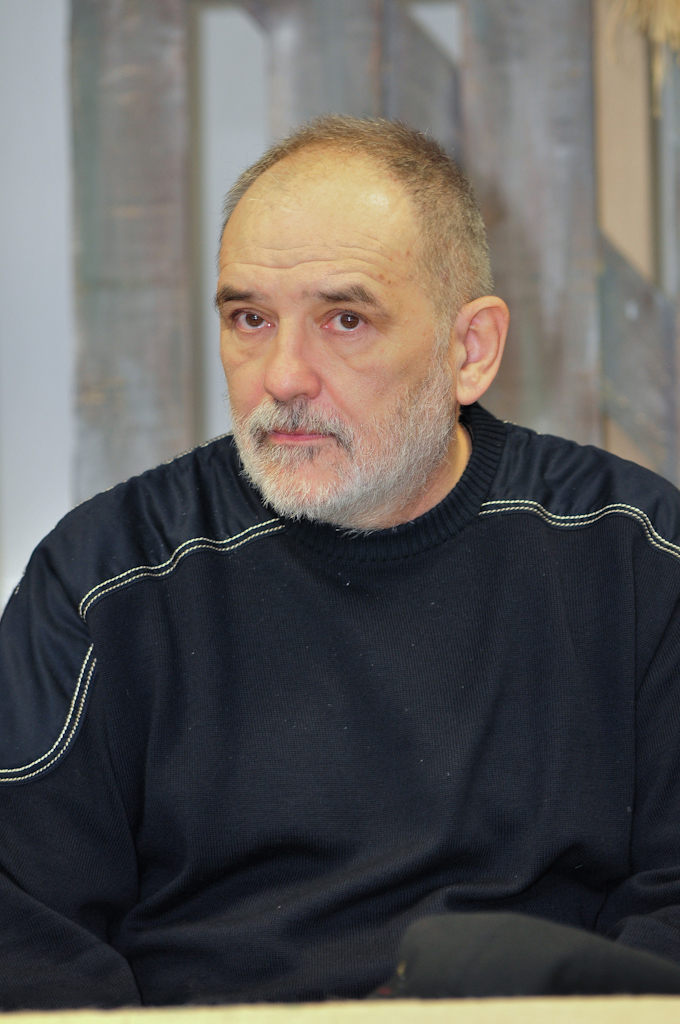
- Balašević in 2010
- Studio albums: 12
- Live albums: 2
- Compilation albums: 4
- Tribute albums: 1
- Singles: 14

The discography of Đorđe Balašević, Serbian and former Yugoslav singer-songwriter, contains 13 studio albums (11 as a solo artist), two live albums, four compilation albums and several singles.

Before his career as a solo-artist, Balašević was a member of bands Žetva (1977–1978) and Rani Mraz (1978–1981) with whom he recorded two studio albums.

== Albums ==
=== Studio albums ===
Year	Album details	Certifications (sales thresholds)
with Rani Mraz (1979–1981)
1979	Mojoj mami umesto maturske slike u izlogu: Label/Catalog No.: PGP RTB LP 55 5345; Format: Vinyl LP	
1980	Odlazi cirkus: Label/Catalog No.: PGP RTB 2520036; Format: Vinyl LP	
Solo career (1981–2021)
1982	Pub: Release: 7 April 1982; Label/Catalog No.: PGP RTB 2320150; Format: Vinyl LP/cassette	
1983	Celovečernji the Kid: Release: December 1983; Label/Catalog No.: PGP RTB 2121514; Format: Vinyl LP/cassette	
1985	003: Release: April 1985; Label/Catalog No.: PGP RTB 212 1948; Format: Vinyl LP/cassette	
1986	Bezdan: Label/Catalog No.: Jugoton LSY 62148; Format: Vinyl LP/cassette	
1988	Panta Rei: Label/Catalog No.: Jugoton LSY 63320; Format: Vinyl LP/cassette	
1989	Tri posleratna druga: Release: November 1989; Label/Catalog No.: Jugoton LP-6 2 02413 1; Format: Vinyl LP	
1991	Marim ja...: Label/Catalog No.: Diskoton LP-8444; Format: Vinyl LP/cassette/CD	
1993	Jedan od onih života...: Label/Catalog No.: UFA Media 0-0002; Format: CD/cassette	
1996	Naposletku...: Label/Catalog No.: UFA Media 9605BN; Format: CD/cassette	
2000	Devedesete: Label/Catalog No.: Hard Rock Shop 101; Format: CD/cassette	
2001	Dnevnik starog momka: Release: 24 December 2001; Label/Catalog No.: Hi-Fi Centar 10255; Format: CD/cassette	
2004	Rani mraz: Label/Catalog No.: Hi-Fi Centar 10273; Format: CD/cassette	

=== Live albums ===
Year	Album details	Certifications (sales thresholds)
1987	U tvojim molitvama - Balade: Label/Catalog No.: PGP RTB 3120074; Format: double vinyl LP/double cassette	
1997	Da l' je sve bilo samo fol?: Label/Catalog No.: D:moll 0-0001; Format: CD	

=== Compilation albums ===
Year	Album details	Certifications (sales thresholds)
1986	Najveći Hitovi Đorđa Balaševića: Label/Catalog No.: PGP RTB 5121698; Format: cassette	
1991	Najveći hitovi: Label/Catalog No.: PGP RTB 410064; Format: CD	
1993	The Best Of Vol. 2 1987 - 1992: Label/Catalog No.: UFA Media 0-0001; Format: CD	
2002	Ostaće okrugli trag na mestu šatre: Label/Catalog No.: Hard Rock Shop – HRS-MC107/109; Format: double CD, double cassette	

== Singles ==
Year	Title	Album
with Žetva (1977–1978)
1977	"U razdeljak te ljubim"	Non-album Single
with Rani Mraz (1978–1981)
1978	"Kristofore crni sine" / "Moja prva ljubav"	Non-album Single
1978	"Računajte na nas" / "Strašan žulj"	Non-album Single
1978	"Ljubio sam snašu na salašu"	Non-album Single
1978	"Oprosti mi, Katrin"	Non-album Single
1979	"Panonski mornar"	Non-album Single
1979	"Prvi januar (popodne)" / "Lagana stvar"	Non-album Single
1980	"Marina"	Non-album Single
1980	"Priča o Vasi Ladačkom"	Odlazi cirkus
1981	"Tri put sam video Tita"	Non-album Single
Solo career (1981–2021)
1982	"Hej čarobnjaci, svi su vam đaci"	Non-album Single
1983	"Pesma o jednom petlu" / "Boža zvani Pub"	Pub
1984	"Svirajte mi jesen stiže, dunjo moja"	Celovečernji the Kid
1985	"Slovenska"	003
1987	"Poluuspavanka"	U tvojim molitvama – Balade
2012	"Osmeh se vratio u grad"	Non-album Single; Digital single
2012	"Ljubav ne pobeđuje"	Non-album Single; Digital single
2012	"Berba '59"	Non-album Single; Digital single
2015	"Duet"	Non-album Single; Digital single
2016	"Rapsodija o Katrin"	Non-album Single; Digital single
2016	"Mala vidra"	Non-album Single; Digital single
2017	"Unikatna"	Non-album Single; Digital single
2017	"Stih iznad svih"	Non-album Single; Digital single
2017	"Mati"	Non-album Single; Digital single
2017	"Dno dna"	Non-album Single; Digital single
2017	"Baronov bal"	Non-album Single; Digital single

== Tribute albums ==
Year	Album details	Certifications (sales thresholds)
2007	Neki noviji klinci i...: Label/Catalog No.: PGP RTS 416811; Format: CD	
