= Tri posleratna druga =

Studio album by Đorđe Balašević
- Released: 16 December 1989
- Recorded: Summer 1989
- Studio: Radio Novi Sad Studio
- Genre: Rock; Folk rock
- Length: 38:52
- Label: Jugoton
- Producer: Đorđe Petrović

Đorđe Balašević chronology
Panta Rei (1988)	Tri posleratna druga (1989)	Marim ja... (1991)

Tri posleratna druga (trans. Three Post-war Friends) is the sixth studio album released by Serbian and former Yugoslav singer-songwriter Đorđe Balašević. The album is a paraphrase and the author's dedication to Remarque, the author of the book Three Comrades.

Tri posleratna druga is the first of Balašević's studio album that featured guitarist Elvis Stanić and drummer Tonči Grabušić from Rijeka. The album is perhaps most memorable for the humorous rap-oriented song "Sugar Rap", the song "Još jedna pesma o maloj garavoj", the folk rock songs "Devojka sa čardaš nogama" and "Ćaletova pesma" and the ballads "D-moll", "Kad odem" and "Saputnik".

On album release day, JRT aired music videos for this album. Videos were filmed in Serbian national theatere (tracks number 2 and 5), by Danube in Novi Sad.

== Background ==
The album was recorded during 1989. With this album, he made amends for the debacle of his previous album.

In January 1989, he held a traditional concert in the Sava Center and the recording was released on 2 VHS cassettes by Jugoton.

== Track listing ==
All the songs were written by Đorđe Balašević.

1. "Sugar Rap" – 4:13
2. "Još jedna pesma o maloj garavoj" (Another Song About A Dark-Haired Little Girl) – 3:16
3. "Devojka sa čardaš nogama" (A Girl With Csárdás Legs) – 3:25
4. "Ćaletova pesma" (My Dad's Song) – 4:50
5. "D-moll" (D Minor) – 4:12
6. "Kad odem" (When I'm Gone) – 5:55
7. "Saputnik" (Fellow Traveler) – 4:50
8. "Remorker" (Tugboat) – 3:50
9. "O, Bože" (Oh, God) – 4:21

== Personnel ==
- Đorđe Balašević – vocals
- Aleksandar Dujin – piano, keyboard
- Aleksandar Kravić – bass guitar
- Elvis Stanić – guitar
- Ignac Šen – violin
- Tonči Grabušić – drums
- Siniša Horvat – sound engineer
- Đorđe Petrović – producer

== Legacy ==
The songs "Devojka sa čardas nogama" and "D-moll" were included in the album Neki noviji klinci i... from 2007, published by PGP RTS.

== Samples ==
- Još jedna pesma o maloj garavoj – Lutka sa naslovne strane by Zabranjeno pušenje, Mirka by Đorđe Balašević and Istok-zapad (telepatski) by Leb i sol.
- Remorker – Poluuspavanka by Đorđe Balašević.
- O, Bože – 1987 by Đorđe Balašević.
