= Super s Karamelom =

- Also known as: Infrakt
- Origin: Bečej, Serbia
- Genres: Pop punk
- Years active: 2003 – present
- Labels: Automatik Records, PGP-RTS
- Members: Vladimir Bakić; Mladen Stojanov; Jovan Šuvakov; Tamara Ružička; Milana Vujkov; Vladimir Ilić
- Past members: Gordana Dragićević; Maja Čiplić; Saša Živković; Milan Armacki; Marko Vujkov
- Website: www.superskaramelom.com

Super s Karamelom (Serbian Cyrillic: Супер с Карамелом, trans. Super with Caramel) is a Serbian pop-punk band from Bečej, Serbia. The band was originally known as Infrakt (Serbian Cyrillic: Инфракт; misspelled Infarkt, trans. Heart Attack) and changed their name to Super s Karamelom in 2003.

== History ==
=== Infrakt ===
The band Infrakt was formed in January 2001, by Vladimir Bakić (guitar, vocals), Marko Vujkov (bass guitar) and Jovan Šuvakov (drums). Having released only one studio album, Prvi... ali koban (First... but Fatal) in 2003, the band members decided to include two female vocalists, Gordana Dragićević and Milana Vujkov and change the name to Super s Karamelom.

=== Super s Karamelom ===
Super s Karamelom was officially formed in March 2003, and in June, the band got another guitarist, Saša Živković. Together they recorded a promo CD, featuring three tracks, "Priđi" ("Come Closer"), "Mali" ("Little Boy") and "Fancy Girl". All three tracks appeared on their debut album in 2004. Fancy Girl was a self-released album and was influenced by the 1980s melodic punk rock. The album featured a cover version of Madonna's single "Like a Prayer", which was excluded on the 2005 rerelease of the album by Automatik Records as self-titled. The band promoted the album with three music videos, for the tracks "Mrzim takve žurke" ("I Hate Those Sort of Parties"), "Debela devojka" ("Fat Girl"), and "Let" ("Flight").

After the album release, Gordana Dragićević left the band and was replaced by Maja Čiplić, only to be herself replaced by Tamara Ružička in 2007. The band participated in the various artists tribute to Đorđe Balašević entitled Neki noviji klinci i... with a cover of Rani Mraz song "Pa dobro gde si ti" ("So, Where Have You Been"). The band also performed at the Novi Sad s ljubavlju and EXIT festival in Novi Sad and i Live and Loud Fest in Zadar and ended their concert activities in 2008 on New Year's Eve, performing at the Liberty Square in Novi Sad. In the meantime, the band started preparing their second album.

Prazne priče released in January 2009, was recorded, like the previous album, at the Komandant Adam studio in Novi Sad, and was self-released. The album featured a new member, guitarist Milan Armacki, who replaced Saša Živković.

In 2011, a group of Serbian animators created ZiMan cartoon series, for which Super s Karamelom recorded the theme song "ZiMan", also recording the video for the song.

== Discography ==
=== Studio albums ===
| Title | Released |
|---|---|
| Prvi... ali koban (as Infrakt) | 2002 |
| Fancy Girl | 2004 |
| Prazne priče | 2009 |

=== Other appearances ===
| Title | Album | Released |
|---|---|---|
| "Pa dobro gde si ti" | Neki noviji klinci i... | 2007 |
