= 003 =

003, O03, 0O3, OO3 may refer to:

- 003, former emergency telephone number for the Norwegian ambulance service (until 1986)
- 1990 OO3, the asteroid 6131 Towen
- OO3 gauge model railway
- O03 (O2) and other related blood type alleles in the ABO blood group system and ABO
- O03 Morganville Airport; see list of airports in Pennsylvania
- Tyrrell 003, 1971 Formula One season car
- BAR 003, 2001 Formula One season car
- 003 (album), by Đorđe Balašević
- BMW 003 turbojet engine
- 003 (UN M.49 code) for North America
- Type 003 aircraft carrier of China
- Scuderia Cameron Glickenhaus SCG 003, an American supercar
