= Rani mraz (album) =

Studio album by Đorđe Balašević
- Released: 2004
- Recorded: October 3, 2003 – April 4, 2004
- Genre: Folk rock
- Length: 64:14
- Label: Hi-Fi Centar
- Producer: Aleksandar Dujin

Đorđe Balašević chronology
Ostaće okrugli trag na mestu šatre (2003)	Rani mraz (2004)

Professional ratings
Review scores
Source	Rating
Monitor	4.5/5 stars

Rani mraz (trans. Early Frost) is the twelfth and final studio album released by Serbian and former Yugoslav singer-songwriter Đorđe Balašević. The title refers to Balašević's former band Rani Mraz.

The album's subtitle was Priča o Vasi Ladačkom.../Muzika iz nesnimljenog filma (Story of Vasa Ladački.../Music from the Film that was not Filmed) referring to Rani Mraz 1980 ballad "Priča o Vasi Ladačkom" which went on to become one of Balašević's signature pieces, and to the film which should have been based on the song and filmed by Balašević and actor and film director Ljubiša Samardžić (the disagreement between Balašević and Samardžić led to two films based on the same story: Samardžić's entitled Jesen stiže, dunjo moja, released in 2004, and Balašević's Kao rani mraz, released in 2010).

Rani mraz features folk rock sound with acoustic instruments, similar to the sound of Balašević's 1996 album Na posletku....

The album featured new studio version of the song "Priča o Vasi Ladačkom" (entitled "Priča o Vasi L."). This is the third version of the song, the first one being the 1980 version from Rani Mraz album Odlazi cirkus, and the second being the version from Balašević's 2003 compilation album Ostaće okrugli trag na mestu šatre. The album's opening track "Pričica o Vasi L." is an instrumental track based on "Priča o Vasi Ladačkom".

== Track listing ==
All the songs were written by Đorđe Balašević.

1. "Pričica o Vasi L." (The Short Story Of Vasa L.) – 3:17
2. "Aco-Braco" (Hey, Aca, My Brother) – 4:21
3. "Čivutski vrt" (Jewish Garden) – 5:15
4. "Kere varošanke" (City Dogs) – 4:40
5. "Lađarska seranata" (Boatman Serenade) – 3:27
6. "Bože, Bože..." (Oh, God, God) – 6:28
7. "Galicia" – 4:45
8. "Tvoj Neko" (Someone Of Yours) – 5:30
9. "Maliganska" (The Drink Song) – 5:50
10. "Ja Vas, kanda, znam sa štranda?" (I Think I Know You From The Strand?) – 4:39
11. "Pred zadnji sneg" (Before The Last Snow) – 3:57
12. "Kao rani mraz" (Like Early Frost) – 4:37
13. "Priča o Vasi L." (The Story Of Vasa L.) – 7:27

== Personnel ==
- Đorđe Balašević – vocals
- Aleksandar Dujin – piano, backing vocals
- Dragan Ivanović – bass guitar
- Petar Radmilović – drums
- Ignac Šen – violin, vocals (on track 8)
- Andrej Maglovski – accordion
- Zoran Alvirović – guitar, vocals (on track 6), backing vocals
- Duda Bezuha – guitar
- Gabor Bunford – clarinet, backing vocals
- Šandor Žadonji – cimbalom
- Timea Kalmar – cello
- Beni Čibri – bass (on track 12)
- Stevan Mošo – prim (on tracks: 4, 7, 10, 11)
- Daniel Davčik – metal can (on track 9)
- Mile Nikolić – bass prim (on tracks: 8, 13)
- Cveta Sladić – bass prim (on tracks: 8, 13)
- Duško Petrović – prim (on tracks: 8, 13)
- Agota Vitkai Kučera – vocals (soprano on track 8)
- St. George Choir (on track 13)
- Pera Alvirović – backing vocals
- Dragan Tasić – backing vocals (on track 3)
- Kemo Arapović – backing vocals (on track 3)
