= Neki noviji klinci i... =

Neki noviji klinci...

Compilation album by Various artists
- Released: 2007
- Recorded: 2007
- Genre: Punk rock, street punk, rockabilly, ska, reggae, folk metal, pop punk, hardcore punk, death metal, blues, thrash metal, electronic, hard rock, heavy metal
- Length: 73:10
- Label: PGP RTS
- Producer: Nikki Lee Man

Professional ratings
Review scores
Source	Rating
Groupie.hr	(mixed)
Vreme	(favorable)

Neki noviji klinci i... (trans. Some Newer Kids and...) is the tribute album to Serbian and former Yugoslav singer-songwriter Đorđe Balašević by bands from his native Novi Sad (with the exception of Super s Karamelom which are from Bečej, Serbia).

Album title refers to the song "Neki novi klinci" (Some New Kids) from the 1979 album Mojoj mami umesto maturske slike u izlogu released by Balašević's former band Rani Mraz. All the funds raised from the album sale were dedicated to orphanage Dečje Selo in Sremska Kamenica. Volunteers' Centre of Vojvodina as the publisher, together with all performers, organized two-day event at Spens Sports Center's West Hall in October 2008, after almost a year from publishing date and after selling complete circulation, for additional fund raising. The concert lasted for 7 hours on both days.

== Track listing ==
1. Tizzies — "Mirka" – 2:30
2. TetraPank — "Lepa profina kći" – 2:50
3. Piknik — "Nikad kao Bane" – 3:59
4. Đarma & Metkovi — "Moj stari frend" – 2:25
5. Zbogom Brus Li — "Jadna i bedna 2007" – 3:30
6. Lost Propelleros — "Pesma o jednom petlu" – 2:39
7. Drum 'n' Zez featuring Zagor & Piknik — "Al' se nekad dobro jelo" – 3:50
8. Pero Defformero — "Jaroslava" – 3:58
9. Čučuk Stana HC Orchestra — "U razdeljak te ljubim" – 1:52
10. Super s Karamelom — "Pa dobro gde si ti" – 3:12
11. Proleće — "Oprosti mi Katrin" – 2:18
12. Nekropolis — "Živeti slobodno" – 3:27
13. Šinobusi — "Život je more" – 5:06
14. Sing Sing Singers — "Baby Blue" – 2:54
15. The Groovers — "Predlog" – 3:06
16. Crosspoint — "Devojka sa čardaš nogama" – 4:34
17. Lee Man — "Limanska" – 4:20
18. Signum — "D Mol" – 4:15
19. Mitesers — "Plava balada" – 3:52
20. Crash 2 — "Crni labud" – 4:27
21. Highway — "Neki novi klinci" – 3:55
