= Ostaće okrugli trag na mestu šatre =

Compilation album by Đorđe Balašević
- Released: 2003
- Recorded: 1991–2003
- Genre: Rock; Folk rock Chanson
- Length: 143:19
- Label: Hard Rock Shop

Đorđe Balašević chronology
Dnevnik starog momka (2001)	Ostaće okrugli trag na mestu šatre (2003)	Rani mraz (2004)

Professional ratings
Review scores
Source	Rating
Monitor	link

Ostaće okrugli trag na mestu šatre (trans. A Round Trace Will Remain Where a Big Tent Once Stood) is a double compilation album released by Serbian and former Yugoslav singer-songwriter Đorđe Balašević.

The album title refers to a verse from the song "Odlazi cirkus" released on the 1980 album of the same name released by Balašević's former band Rani Mraz. Album, released in 2003, features new (mostly acoustic) studio versions of the songs "Marim ja...", "Ne volim januar", "Neki novi klinci", "Još jedna pesma o prvoj ljubavi", "Jednom su sadili lipu..." (originally released as "Jednom..."), "Olelole", "Pile moje, kako stvari stoje" (originally released as "Predlog"), "Protina kći" (originally released as "Lepa protina kći"), "Za treću smenu", "Ostaje mi to sto se volimo", "Priča o V. Ladačkom" (originally released as "Priča o Vasi Ladačkom"), "Marina", "Život je more", "O, kako tužnih ljubavi ima?", and "Lunjo...". The songs that were originally released on Balašević's 2001 album Dnevnik starog momka featured alternative titles: "Ljudmila" was released as "Noć kad je Tisa nadošla", "Jaroslava" as "Princezo, javi se...", and "Eleonora" as "Na Bogojavljensku noć".

== Track listing ==
=== Disc One ===
1. "Marim ja..." – 4:20
2. "Živeti slobodno" – 5:23
3. "Ne volim januar" – 4:36
4. "Neki novi klinci" – 4:24
5. "Balkanski tango" – 6:30
6. "Stih na asfaltu" – 4:13
7. "Još jedna pesma o prvoj ljubavi" – 3:59
8. "Jednom su sadili lipu..." – 5:04
9. "Namćor" – 5:34
10. "Olelole" – 4:18
11. "Noć kad je Tisa nadošla" – 4:32
12. "Pile moje, kako stvari stoje" – 3:14
13. "Protina kći" – 4:21
14. "Za treću smenu" – 5:00
15. "Ostaje mi to što se volimo" – 6:18

=== Disc Two ===
1. "Priča o V. Ladačkom" – 6:40
2. "Poslednja nevesta" – 5:19
3. "Čovek za koga se udala Buba Erdeljan" – 5:47
4. "Miholjsko leto" – 4:47
5. "Princezo, javi se..." – 5:04
6. "Provincijalka" – 4:50
7. "Marina" – 3:30
8. "Na Bogojavljensku noć" – 4:51
9. "Sin jedinac" – 4:47
10. "Život je more" – 3:27
11. "Ja luzer?" – 4:26
12. "Kao talas" – 4:50
13. "O, kako tužnih ljubavi ima?" – 4:30
14. "Lunjo..." – 4:26
15. "Uspavanka za dečaka" – 4:19
