= Apsolutno Romantično =

Serbian musical group

- Origin: Novi Sad, Serbia
- Genres: Pop rock, folk rock, pop, jazz
- Years active: 1999–present
- Labels: Komuna, PGP-RTS
- Spinoff of: Garavi Sokak
- Members: Petar Alvirović; Zoran "Kina" Alvirović; Julije Dondo; Mihael Horvat
- Past members: Senad Jašarević; Ondrej Maglovski; Rešad Jahja; Dragan Tasić; Kemal Arapović
- Website: apsolutnoromanticno.com

Apsolutno Romantično (Serbian Cyrillic: Апсолутно Романтично, trans. Absolutely Romantic) is a Serbian pop rock/folk rock band.

== History ==
The band was formed in 1999 by Garavi Sokak members, brothers Petar (vocals, guitar) and Zoran "Kina" Alvirović (vocals, guitar). They were soon joined by actor Nenad Vujanović (percussion). In 2000, they were joined by two more members: Željko Glamočanin (bass guitar) and Dragan Tasić (drums).

In 2000, they released their debut album Kasno je prepraviti stih (It's Late to Rewrite the Verse). In 2003, the band released their second album Naša ulica u nebo se penje (Our Street Is Climbing to the Sky). The album featured the song "Đoletova pesma" ("Đole's Song"), which was recorded with singer-songwriter Đorđe Balašević. In 2003, with Momčilo Bajagić, the band recorded the soundtrack for the film The Professional. In 2005, Apsolutno Romantično released the album Teško je biti sam (It's Hard to Be Alone). In 2012, they released the double album Vojvođanski Spomenar (Album of Vojvodina), featuring covers of 27 traditional songs.

== Discography ==
- Kasno je prepraviti stih (2000)
- Naša ulica u nebo se penje (2003)
- Muzika iz filma Profesionalac (with Momčilo Bajagić, 2003)
- Teško je biti sam (2005)
- Vojvođanski Spomenar (2012)
