= Zbogom Brus Li =

Serbian punk rock band

- Origin: Novi Sad, Serbia
- Genres: Punk rock, folk punk, children's music, pop rock
- Years active: 1992–2000; 2005–present
- Labels: Music Yuser, L.V.O. Records, Tarcus, Zmaj Children Games, Flying Buffalo, PGP-RTS
- Members: Shaka Zuluf; Smuk Foo; Deya-Woo; KostaBass; Pe-Lee
- Past members: Mar-Tai; Srđan Brus; Ćo-Fee; Keca; Bingo Star; Ica Džiu-džica; Mi-Lun kralj Ponoći; Go-Ya; Amon-Ra; Jovandeka Lee Metalika; Mu-Lan; Buži Fajter; Ljuba Nunčaki; Bane Stalak; Lepi Brena; Dulles; Đori Lee

Zbogom Brus Li (Serbian Cyrillic: Збогом Брус Ли; trans. Goodbye Bruce Lee) is a Serbian punk rock band from Novi Sad. Influenced by Misfits, Ramones, Toy Dolls, Cock Sparrer, Dickies, T.Rex, Hard-Ons and other acts, the band combines punk rock and folk music of Vojvodina into a style the band describes as "tamburaški punk" ("tamburitza punk").

== History ==
=== 1992 – 2000 ===
The band was formed in 1992. Initially, the band had frequent lineup changes, until a steady lineup, consisting of Slavko Matić (also known as Shakin' Slavisha, vocals), Aleksandar Jovanović (also known as Jovandeka Li Metalika, bass guitar), Branislav Smuk (also known as Smuk Fu, guitar), and Boban Dejanović (also known as Boban Li, drums), was formed. The band started performing dressed in various costumes, and initially performed with the theatre group Alternativna scena Blek Stena (Alternative Scene Il Grande Blek).

In 1994, the band self-released the EP Zbogom Brus Li. The EP featured four songs, and was released on compact cassette only. The band released their debut album Penk Punk Pink Pank Ponk in 1995. The album was originally released through Music Yuser, and, during the same year, rereleased through L.V.O. Records. The album featured humorous songs, with quotations from Zvonko Bogdan's and Šaban Šaulić's songs and samples from the films Who's That Singing Over There, Reflections and Dune, and the TV show Grlom u jagode. During the same year, they participated in the recording of Želimir Žilnik's film Marble Ass.

At the beginning of 2007, the band released the album Zlobro (Evilood) through the record label Tarcus. The album featured, besides new songs, seven songs from their debut album as bonus tracks. In 1999, they released the album Hogli-Vogli Rok (Hogley-Vogley Rock) with the help of children's music festival Zmaj Children Games. The album featured children's music songs played in a punk rock manner. After releasing the album, in 2000, Zbogom Brus Li disbanded.

=== 2005 – present ===
The band reunited in 2005. In 2007, they participated in the Đorđe Balašević tribute album Neki noviji klinci i... (Some Newer Kids And...), with a cover of Đorđe Balašević song "1987.", Zbogom Brus Li version entitled "Jadna i benda 2007." ("Wretched and Miserable 2007"). In 2008, they released the album Ratatariteti (Ratatarities) through Flying Buffalo. The album feature songs written during the 1992 — 2000 period, but previously unreleased.

In 2008, the band released the studio album Ukleti salaš (The Haunted Farm) through PGP-RTS. The album consisted of ten new and eight old songs by the band. In 2009, the band appeared on the compilation album Punks, Skins & Rudeboys Now! Vol. 18, released by Polish record label Jimmy Jazz Records. During the same year, the band appeared at the Beovizija 2009 semi-final with the song "Ha ha ha", ending up in 15th place and failing to qualify for the finals. The song was released on the festival's official compilation album.

In 2012, Zbogom Brus Li celebrated their twentieth anniversary by releasing a 10" mini album entitled Kokainka (Cocaine Girl), also available for free download from Exit festival official website, which featured Nikola Pejaković "Kolja", Bobo Knežević, Predrag Vranešević and other guests. The comedy metal band Pero Defformero covered Zbogom Brus Li song "Ukleti salaš", in honor to Zbogom Brus Li's anniversary. in May 2013, the band released the live album "Noć živih hitova - Live at SKCNS Fabrika 22.11.2012. (The Night of Living Hits - Live at SKCNS Fabrika October 22, 2012) for free download via Nocturne magazine official website. In 2015, a monograph about the band, entitled Zaposlenima ulaz besposlen, was published. The monograph, edited by Slavko Matić, featured more than 5000 photographs of the band, drawings and comics. At the same time, Zbogom Brus Li released the single "Pevaju svi" ("Everybody Sings"), announcing a documentary about the band.

== Discography ==
=== Studio albums ===
- Penk Punk Pink Pank Ponk (1995)
- Zlobro (1997)
- Hogli-Vogli Rok (1999)
- Ratatatariteti! (2008)
- Ukleti salaš (2008)

=== Live albums ===
- Noć živih hitova - Live at SKCNS Fabrika 22.11.2012. (2013)

=== EPs and mini-LPs ===
- Zbogom Brus Li (1994)
- Kokainka (2012)

=== Other appearances ===
- "Vaterpolo", "Legenda o Bužiju Fajteru", "Živeti bogato" (NS Subculture Volume 1: Ponešto Deluje; 1993)
- "Živeti bogato", "Vaterpolo" (It's Up To You; 1994)
- "Ja te volim, a ti si kremašica" (Punk! Oi!! Yu; 1996)
- "Kiše" (Novosadska Punk Verzija 1978 - 2005; 2006)
- "Vatra ljubavi" (CPB Kompilacija; 2006)
- "To je vatra ljubavi" (Role Model - Tribute to Ljubiša Georgijević 1976-2005; 2006)
- "Jadna i bedna 2007." (Neki noviji klinci i...; 2007)
- "Kaćuša", "Panonska krimi priča" (Mak Off - Vojvodina Calling, 2008)
- "Pankburaški splet", "Ladi, Ladi, Lom" (Punks, Skins & Rudeboys Now! Vol. 18; 2009)
- "Ha ha ha" (Beovizija 2009; 2009)
