= Bilja Krstić =

Serbian singer (born 1955)

Bilja Krstić Биља Крстић
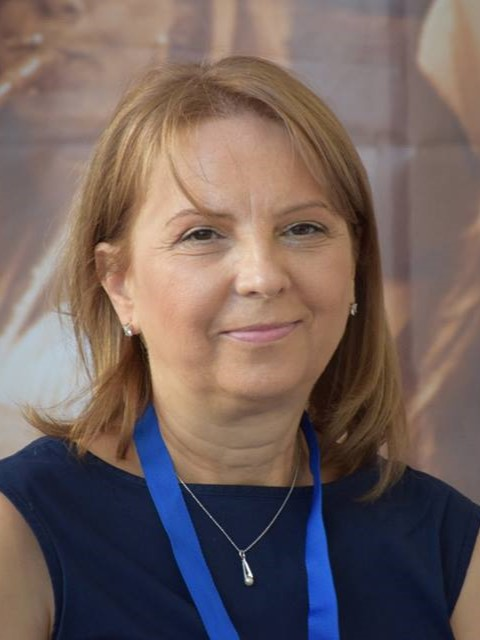
- Bilja Krstić in 2016

Background information
- Born: Biljana Krstić; 9 November 1955 (age 70); Niš, PR Serbia, FPR Yugoslavia
- Genres: Rock; pop; children's music; ethnic music; world music
- Occupations: Singer; songwriter
- Years active: 1977–present
- Labels: PGP-RTB; PGP-RTS; One; Hi-Fi Centar; Mascom; ARC Music; Croatia
- Formerly of: Suncokret; Rani Mraz
- Website: www.bilja.rs

Biljana "Bilja" Krstić (Serbian Cyrillic: Биљана „Биља“ Крстић, pronounced [bǐʎana bǐːʎa kř̩ːstitɕ]; born 9 November 1955) is a Serbian and Yugoslav singer and songwriter.

Starting her musical career as a teenager, Krstić gained nationwide popularity as a member of the rock band Suncokret. She later moved to the band Rani Mraz, with which she also achieved large commercial and critical success. She started her solo career in 1983, releasing three mostly pop rock-oriented albums and one children's music album to moderate success. In the late 1990s she started performing ethnic music, to large critical acclaim and mainstream success in Serbia and abroad. With her backing band Bistrik Orchestra, Krstić has recorded six studio albums with covers of traditional songs from the Balkans and performed on world music festivals across the world. She has composed music for film, television and theatre.

== Biography ==
=== Early career ===
Biljana Krstić started her career as a teenager, in 1972, as a member of the band Bubamare (Ladybugs) from Leskovac. After graduating from highschool, she started her studies of music at the Belgrade Music Academy.

=== Suncokret and Rani Mraz (1975–1981) ===
Krstić joined the band Suncokret in 1975 as one of the group's three female vocalist. With the band she recorded the studio album Moje bube (My Bugs, 1977) and four 7-inch singles, achieving nationwide popularity. In 1978 Krstić and vocalist Bora Đorđević left the group and joined the newly-formed Rani Mraz, led by Đorđe Balašević. Đorđević would soon leave the band, but Krstić would stay in the band, soon remaining, alongside Balašević, the only official member of the Rani Mraz until its official dissolution in 1981, recording the albums Mojoj mami umesto maturske slike u izlogu (To my Mom instead of a Prom Photo in the Shop-Window, 1978) and Odlazi cirkus (The Circus Is Leaving, 1980) with the group.

=== Solo career (1983–present) ===
==== Pop and rock years (1983–2000) ====
Krstić started her solo career in 1983 with the album Prevari noćas svoje društvo sa mnom (Cheat on Your Friends with Me Tonight). The album featured songs written by Josip Boček and Đorđe Balašević. It was followed by the albums Iz unutrašnjeg džepa (From the Inner Pocket), released in 1985, and Bilja, released in 1994, featuring songs written by a number prominent musicians and songwriters from the Yugoslav rock scene, including Kornelije Kovač, Srđan Šaper, Nebojša Krstić, Momčilo Bajagić, Žika Milenković, Dušan Mihajlović "Spira", Radoman Kanjevac, Bata Zlatković, and Nikola Čuturilo. In 1990 she released the children's music album Loptom do zvezda (With a Ball to the Stars), featuring songs from the TV show Srećan put u XXI vek (Safe Trip to the 21st Century). The songs were written on poems of children's poets Miroslav Antić, Slobodan Stanišić and Vladimir Andrić.

During these years, she made numerous appearances as a backing vocalist on albums by various artists from Belgrade and worked as a music editor on Radio Belgrade.

==== Ethnic music years (2000–present) ====
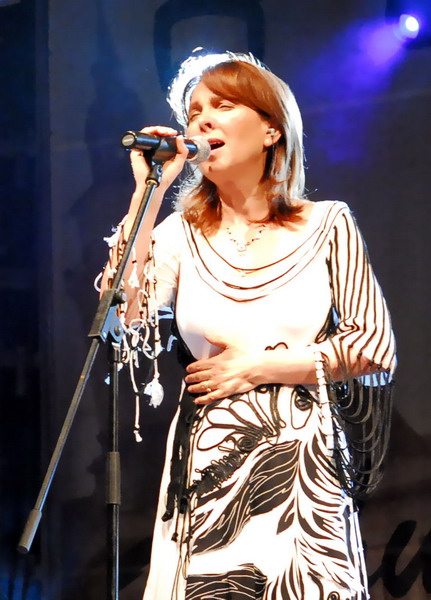
Krstić performing in 2008

Krstić turned to ethnic music with her 2000 album Bistrik (a word play which could be roughly translated as Area of Clean Water), produced by Ljuba Ninković and featuring covers of traditional songs from Serbia, Romania, North Macedonia and Hungary. The album was originally released through One Records, and was later reissued by the Greek branch of V2 Records. In 2001, the TV show based on the songs from Bistrik, entitled Ručni rad (Handicraft) was shot. The show won the fourth place at the Rose d'Or festival in Montreux.

In 2003, Krstić released the album Zapisi (Inscriptions), featuring songs originally written for Zdravko Šotra's 2002 film Zona Zamfirova and Boško Buha Theatre play Šargor, the latter directed by Milan Karadžić. She recorded the album with her Bistrik Orchestra, featuring Ljuba Ninković (formerly of S Vremena Na Vreme, shargia, guitar, vocals), Branko Isaković (formerly of Suncokret, Bulevar, Propaganda, Idoli and Kerber, bass), Dragomir "Miki" Stanojević (formerly of Poslednja Igra Leptira, keyboards), Nenad Josifović (violin), Milinko Ivanović (flute, duduk), Maja Kislinski (percussion, vocals), and Ruža Rudić and Nataša Mihaljinac (backing vocals). Besides covers of traditional songs, like "Jovano Jovanke", "Ergen deda" and "Kozar - zurli treštat na sred selo", the album featured the song "Šargor kolo" composed by Ljuba Ninković.

The albums Bistrik and Zapisi brought international attention to Krstić and Bistrik Orchestra. In 2005 Krstić performed in São Paulo as a member of the Mediterraneo Orchestra, composed of world music artists from across the world.

In 2006, Bilja Krstić and Bistrik Orchestra released the album Tarpoš, named after a traditional women's cap from the Balkans and featuring covers of traditional songs. The album was recorded with new members of the Bistrik Orchestra: Ninković and Isaković were replaced by Krstić's former bandmates from Suncokret Nenad Božić and Bata Božanić respectively, and the group was joined by backing vocalist Nevenka Radonić. Tarpoš was released in Serbia through PGP-RTS, and internationally by German record label Ituition Schott Music. It was pronounced one of top ten 2007 albums by the British music magazine Songlines, and Krstić's song "The Sad Letter" appeared on the magazine's compilation album Top of the World 44. In 2008, the band released the video album Bilja Krstić i Bistrik Orchestra – LIVE, with the recording of their concert held in Belgrade's Terazije Theatre on 27 November 2007.

In 2012, Krstić started her vocal workshop at the Ilija M. Kolarac Endowment. In 2013, Krstić and Bistrik Orchestra recorded the a capella album Izvorište (The Wellspring) with ethnic musician Dimitrije "Mikan" Obradović. The album featured new covers of traditional songs from Serbia, as well as some of previously recorded covers in new musical arrangements. In 2017, Krstić and Bistrik Orchestra released the album Svod (Sky) through the British record label ARC Music. The album featured covers of traditional songs from across the Balkans. In 2023, they released the album Biljur (Crystal) through Croatia Records, featuring covers of traditional songs with the topic of women's struggle for the freedom of choice.

=== Film and TV music (2002–present) ===
Krstić wrote music for Zdravko Šotra's 2002 film Zona Zamfirova, which was released on the album Zapisi. On the 2003 Herceg Novi Film Festival the film was awarded for the best score, and on the 2003 Mostra de València film festival it won the First Award for Best Music. With Dragomir Stanojević she wrote music for Srđan Koljević's 2015 film The Man Who Defended Gavrilo Princip, released on the soundtrack album Branio sam Mladu Bosnu (I Defended Young Bosnia, the literal translation of the film's original title). She wrote music for the TV series Šesto čulo (Sixth Sense) and co-wrote the music for the TV series Crna svadba (Black Wedding) with Dragomir Stanojević.

== Collaborations ==
Bilja Krstić has worked with Tenores di Bitti "Mialinu Pira", David D`Or, Marta Sebestyen, Yanka Rupkina, Amira Medunjanin, Tamara Obrovac, Bojan Zulfikarpašić, Vlatko Stefanovski, Nenad Vasilić, Magda Dourado Pucci, Vasko Atanasovski, Vlado Kreslin, Bora Dugić, Boban Marković and Marko Marković and others.

== Accolades ==
- Prince's Award for the Ethnic Music Album of the Year (Bistrik, 2001)
- Prince's Award for the Ethnic Music Album of the Year (Zapisi, 2003)
- Beovizija Award for the Best Ethnic Music Album (Zapisi, 2003)
- Beovizija Award for the Best Ethnic Music Album (Tarpoš, 2007)
- Union of Entertainment and Music Artists of Serbia Lifetime Achievement Award (2018)

== Discography ==
=== Studio albums ===
- Moje bube (1977)

==== Singles ====
- "Gde ćeš biti, lepa Kejo" / "Pusto more, pusti vali" (1976)
- "Rock 'n' Roll duku duku" / "Gili gili blues" (1976)
- "Oj, nevene" / "Tekla voda" (1976)
- "Imam pesmu za sve ljude" / "Čovek koga znam" (1978)

=== With Rani Mraz ===
==== Studio albums ====
- Mojoj mami umesto maturske slike u izlogu (1979)
- Odlazi cirkus (1980)

==== Singles ====
- "Računajte na nas" / "Strašan žulj" (1978)
- "Oprosti mi Katrin" / "Život je more" (1978)
- "Panonski mornar" / "Moja draga sad je u Japanu" (1979)
- "Lagana stvar" / "Prvi januar (popodne)" (1979)

=== Solo ===
==== Studio albums ====
- Prevari večeras svoje društvo sa mnom (1983)
- Iz unutrasnjeg džepa (1985)
- Loptom do zvezda (1990)
- Bilja (1994)
- Bistrik (2000)
- Zapisi (2003)
- Tarpoš (2007)
- Izvorištе (2013)
- Branio sam Mladu Bosnu (With Dragomir Stanojević, 2015)
- Svod (2017)
- Biljur (2023)

==== Video albums ====
- Bilja Krstić i Bistrik Orchestra – LIVE (2008)
