= Bezdan (album) =

1986 album by Đorđe Balašević

Studio album by Đorđe Balašević
- Released: June 17, 1986
- Recorded: Studio RTVNS, Novi Sad; June 1986
- Genres: Rock; Chanson
- Length: 38:26
- Label: Jugoton
- Producer: Đorđe Petrović

Đorđe Balašević chronology
003 (1985)	Bezdan (1986)	U tvojim molitvama – Balade (1987)

Bezdan (trans. Abyss) is the fourth studio album released by Serbian and former Yugoslav singer-songwriter Đorđe Balašević. The album was produced by Đorđe Petrović and arrangements were done by Aleksandar Dujin. Those two would be the key associates of Balašević for the next twenty-five years and become the backbone of Balašević supporting band The Unfuckables.

The album's biggest hits were the ballads "Ne volim januar", "Bezdan" and "Ne lomite mi bagrenje". Live versions of "Ne volim januar" usually feature a long concluding monologue. "Ne lomite mi bagrenje" ("Don't Break My Locusts") caused much controversy. Some critics stated that the song was metaphorically speaking against Albanian terror over Serbs in the conflict on Kosovo. Balašević later explained that "it is not a song about ethnicities, but about good and evil, and I don't regret, I called the Evil its full name even when others praised it.". Later, in late 1990s, he stated that "I didn't know that Serbs would become Shqiptars to Shqiptars. That turned around. We are the ones who break locusts now, but I can't take the blame for that".

The album was polled in 1998 as the 25th on the list of 100 greatest Yugoslav rock and pop albums in the book YU 100: najbolji albumi jugoslovenske rok i pop muzike (YU 100: The Best albums of Yugoslav pop and rock music).

== Track listing ==
All songs written by Đorđe Balašević.

1. "Sve je otišlo u Honduras" (All Gone To Honduras) – 3:53
2. "Virovitica" (Virovitica) – 3:28
3. "Ne volim januar" (I Don't Like January) – 4:10
4. "Nema više benda kao Neoplanti" (There Are No More Bands Like Neoplanti) – 3:17
5. "Bezdan" (Abyss) – 4:30
6. "Stari orkestar" (The Old Orchestra) – 2:49
7. "Narodnjaci" (Folk Singers) – 4:53
8. "Ne lomite mi bagrenje" (Don't Break My Locusts) – 5:34
9. "Slow Motion" – 5:52
