= Marim ja... =

Studio album by Đorđe Balašević
- Released: September 1991
- Recorded: Radio Novi Sad Studio; June 1991
- Genre: Rock; Folk rock
- Length: 38:07
- Label: Diskoton

Đorđe Balašević chronology
Tri posleratna druga (1989)	Marim ja... (1991)	Jedan od onih života... (1993)

Marim ja... (trans. I Don't Mind...) is the seventh studio album released by Serbian and former Yugoslav singer-songwriter Đorđe Balašević (credited simply as "Đole" on the album cover).

== Track listing ==
All the songs were written by Đorđe Balašević.

1. "Čovek za koga se udala Buba Erdeljan" (The Man Buba Erdeljan Married) – 5:47
2. "Ringišpil" (Carousel) – 5:37
3. "Slabo divanim mađarski" (I Barely Speak Hungarian) – 3:21
4. "Marim ja..." (I Don't Mind...) – 4:15
5. "Nevernik" (Infidel) – 3:41
6. "Divlji badem" (Wild Almond) – 3:56
7. "Citron pesma" (The Citrus Song) – 3:04
8. "Olelole" – 3:46
9. "Kako su zli dedaci razbucali proslavu godišnjice braka kod mog druga Jevrema" (How The Evil Old Men Ruined My Friend Jevrem's Wedding Anniversary Celebration) – 4:39

== Personnel ==
- Đorđe Balašević – vocals
- Aleksandar Dujin – piano, keyboards, backing vocals
- Aleksandar Kravić – bass guitar
- Elvis Stanić – guitar, backing vocals
- Tonči Grabušić – drums, backing vocals
- Davor Rodik – pedal steel guitar
- Nenad Jazunović – timpani
- Josip "Kiki" Kovač – violin
- Đorđe Petrović – producer
- Jan Šaš – engineer
- Siniša Horvat – engineer
