= Devedesete =

Studio album by Đorđe Balašević
- Released: May 11, 2000
- Recorded: October 1998–April 2000
- Studio: Studio Music Factory, Belgrade Studio Megamix, Maribor
- Genre: Rock; Folk rock
- Length: 69:55
- Label: Hard Rock Shop – Đorđe Balašević

Đorđe Balašević chronology
Da l' je sve bilo samo fol? (1997)	Devedesete (2000)	Dnevnik starog momka (2001)

Devedesete (trans. The Nineties) is the tenth studio album released by Serbian and former Yugoslav singer-songwriter Đorđe Balašević.

Inspired with the events in Serbia at the end of 1990s, Devedesete was Balašević's most politically involved album (for this reason the album was partially self-released). Balašević openly made fun of Slobodan Milošević with the song "Legenda o Gedi Gluperdi", criticized police officers who defended the corrupt system by confronting demonstrating youth in "Plava balada", looked back to the 1990s with disgust in the title song "Devedesete", supplied young demonstrators with an anthem "Živeti slobodno" (dedicated to civic youth movement Otpor!). He reached out, not without shame, to his lost friends in war-torn Bosnia with "Sevdalinka", and showed sincere resentment, but little to no regret, at the 1999 NATO bombing of Novi Sad in "Dok gori nebo nad Novim Sadom".

== Background ==
During winter 1996/97, he held traditionally concerts in Sava Center in Belgrade. At some of concerts in January 1997, he said that Belgrade is coming back to the maps.

In February 1998, he held concerts in Sarajevo for the first time after war in Bosnia. Later that year, he became UNHCR ambassador.

In January 1999, his second daughter Jelena had injured in car crash. She persuaded Balašević to cut his hair bald and do a tattoo.

During NATO bombing of Yugoslavia in spring 1999, he performed in front of National Theatre in Belgrade. His wife and children were in Budapest during bombing.

== Album ==
Song "Živeti slobodno" is actually inspired by song "Živjeti slobodno" of Croatian group Time and it's about Dado Topić's prison days for refusing military service. Song "Plava balada" has an early version from 1997.

Album has videos for title track, "Sevdalinka" and "Dok gori nebo nad Novim Sadom".

== Tour ==
Album was followed by concerts in Belgrade, Zrenjanin, Jagodina, Novi Sad, Čačak, Pula etc.

=== Concert in Pula ===
The concert in Pula was originally supposed to take place in 2000 alongside Atomsko sklonište, but it was postponed to June 2001. It is also the first concert in Croatia after the war there. In honor of that concert, a documentary film Na stanici u Puli (At the station in Pula) was also shot. The proceeds of this concert went to the Pula Clinical Center.

== Track listing ==
All the songs written by Đorđe Balašević.

1. "Devedesete" (The Nineties) – 5:51
2. "Živeti slobodno" (Living Freely) – 5:23
3. "Balkanski tango" (Balkan Tango) – 6:28
4. "Plava balada" (The Blue Ballad) – 5:38
5. "Stih na asfaltu" (A Verse on the Asphalt) – 4:00
6. "Gedo Gluperdo" (Gedo The Stupid) – 6:54
7. "Sevdalinka" (Sevdalinka) – 6:01
8. "Kao talas" (Like A Wave) – 4:48
9. "Nedostaje mi naša ljubav..." (I Miss Our Love...) – 3:49
10. "Naopaka bajka" (An Inverse Fairy Tale) – 7:04
11. "Dok gori nebo nad Novim Sadom" (While The Sky Burns Over Novi Sad) – 6:08
12. "Mrtvi" (The Dead) – 5:02
13. "Psovka na temu Devedesete" (Cursing on a Theme of the Nineties) – 2:05
