= Nenad Vasilić =

Austrian composer

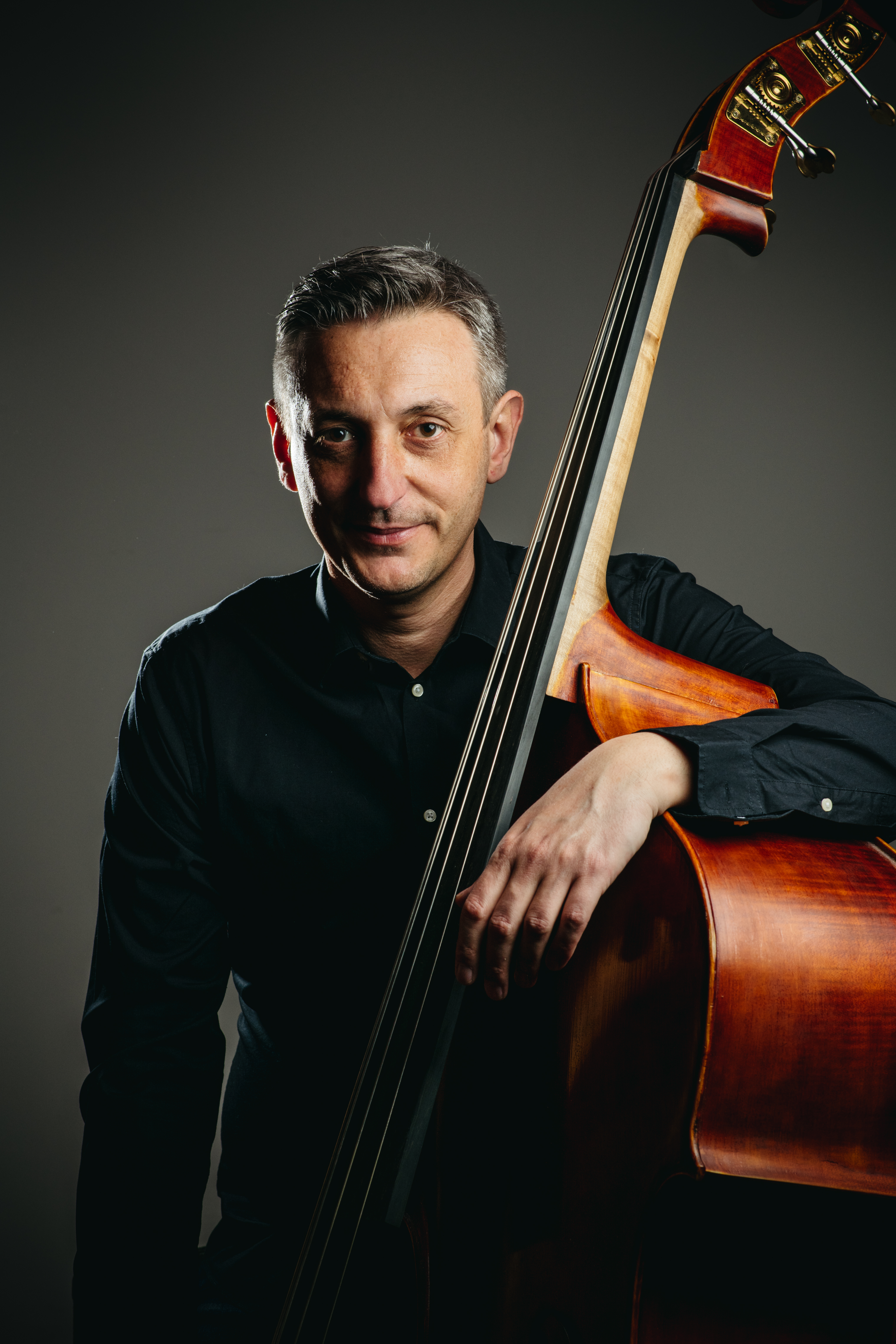
- Nenad Vasilić in 2019
- Born: 8 May 1975 (age 50); Niš, Serbia
- Occupations: Musician; composer; arranger
- Website: www.vasilic.com

Nenad Vasilić is a Serbian bassist.

== Early life and education ==
Nenad Vasilic was born in Niš, Serbia. He started playing piano at the age of 5. At the age of 12 he received his first bass guitar and at the age of 15 he enrolled in the Secondary Music School in Niš. When he was 19 he studied contrabass and bass guitar at the Jazz Academy in Graz, Austria.

== Career ==
In 1998, Vasilić formed his own band "Vasilić Nenad Balkan Band" and in 1999, he recorded his first album called "Jugobasija" in Austria. He has produced albums as a band leader, double bass player and composer and collaborated with Mark Murphy, the American jazz singer Sheila Jordan, Ritchie Beirah, Peter Ralchev, Vlatko Stefanovski, Wolfgang Puschnig, Bojan Zulfikarpasic, John Hollenbeck (musician), Martin Lubenov, Stjepko Gut, Bilja Krstić, Tamara Obrovac, Lori Antonioli, Amira Medunjanin and others.

== Discography ==
- Nenad Vasilic "Yugobassia" 1999
- Nenad Vasilic Balkan Band "Joe Jack" (Nabel Records) 2003
- Nenad Vasilic Balkan Band "Live in ORF" (ORF (broadcaster)) 2004
- Nenad Vasilic "Honey & Blood" (Connecting Cultures) 2006
- Nenad Vasilić & Armend Xhaferi "Beyond the Another Sky" (Extraplatte ) 2001/2008
- Nenad Vasilic "Just Fly" (Extraplatte) 2010
- Nenad Vasilic "Seven" (Galileo 2012)
- Nenad Vasilic "The Art of the Balkan Bass" (Galileo) 2015
- Nenad Vasilic "Wet Paint" (Galileo) 2016
- Nenad Vasilic "Live in Theater Akzent" (Galileo) 2017
- Nenad Vasilic "Bass Room" (Galileo) 2019
- Nenad Vasilic "Vol.1" (Galileo) 2020
