= Panta Rei (Đorđe Balašević album) =

Studio album by Đorđe Balašević
- Released: December 5, 1988
- Recorded: Radio Novi Sad Studio
- Genre: Rock; Chanson
- Length: 41:28
- Label: Jugoton
- Producer: Đorđe Petrović

Đorđe Balašević chronology
U tvojim molitvama - Balade (1987)	Panta Rei (1988)	Tri posleratna druga (1989)

Panta Rei is the fifth studio album released by Serbian and former Yugoslav singer-songwriter Đorđe Balašević.

The song "Requiem" was dedicated to the late Josip Broz Tito, while the satire "Soliter" caricatures SFR Yugoslavia as a high-rise in which only the façade still holds while foundations slide.

== Track listing ==
All the songs were written by Đorđe Balašević.

1. "Soliter" (High-rise) – 3:00
2. "Neki se rode kraj vode" (Some Are Born by the Water) – 3:42
3. "Oni" (They) – 3:56
4. "Šansona" (Chanson) – 4:53
5. "Nemam ništa s tim" (I Have Nothing To Do With It) – 5:35
6. "Starim" (I'm Growing Old) – 6:12
7. "Čekajući Montenegro Express" (Waiting for the Montenegro Express) – 3:35
8. "Jednom..." (Once...) – 4:42
9. "Requiem" – 5:53
