= Dnevnik starog momka =

Studio album by Đorđe Balašević
- Released: December 21, 2001 - Slovenia December 24, 2001 - Federal Republic of Yugoslavia December 28, 2001 - Croatia
- Recorded: November–December 2001
- Studio: Music Factory Studio, Košutnjak, Belgrade
- Genre: Rock; Folk rock
- Length: 58:47
- Label: Hi-Fi Centar
- Producer: Đorđe Petrović

Đorđe Balašević chronology
Da l' je sve bilo samo fol? (2000)	Dnevnik starog momka (2001)	Ostaće okrugli trag na mestu šatre (2003)

Professional ratings
Review scores
Source	Rating
Monitor	4/5 stars
Rock Express	(favorable)

Dnevnik starog momka (trans. Diary of an Old Bachelor) is the eleventh studio album released by Serbian and former Yugoslav singer-songwriter Đorđe Balašević.

Balašević's first album after the 2000 political changes in Serbia, Dnevnik starog momka featured only love songs, each having a female name as its title (for this reason most songs remain better known by their unofficial titles, for an example: "Jaroslava" is better known as "Princezo, javi se", "Anđela" as "Moja je draga veštica" etc.). The first letters of the songs' names form the acrostic "Olja je najbolja" (Olja is the best), which refers to Balašević's wife Olivera "Olja" Balašević.

== Track listing ==
All lyrics are written by Đ. Balašević; all music is composed by Đ. Balašević

No.	Title	Unofficial title	Length
1.	"Otilia"	"Lakonoga"	4:40
2.	"Ljerka"	"Korzo"	4:18
3.	"Ankica"	"Još jedan dan bez nje"	4:31
4.	"Jaroslava"	"Princezo, javi se"	5:02
5.	"Eleonora"	"Na bogojavljensku noć"	4:48
6.	"Nevena"	"Sale Nađ"	5:21
7.	"Anita"	"Budimpeštanski sneg"	4:04
8.	"Julia"	"Žal za jugom"	5:25
9.	"Branislava"	"Patetični bluz"	7:00
10.	"Ognjena"	"Malecka"	5:00
11.	"Ljudmila"	"Noć kad je Tisa nadošla"	4:28
12.	"Anđela"	"Moja je draga veštica"	3:40

== Personnel ==
- Đorđe Balašević – vocals
- Duda Bezuha – guitar
- Aleksandar Dujin – piano, backing vocals
- Aleksandar Kravić – bass guitar, backing vocals
- Petar Radmilović – drums, backing vocals
- Đorđe Petrović – keyboard
- Ignac Šen – violin
- Gabor Bunford – saxophone, slavinet, backing vocals
- Zsadanyi Sandor – cymbal
- Sale Vukosaveljević – backing vocals
