= Jedan od onih života... =

Studio album by Đorđe Balašević
- Released: December 1993
- Recorded: November–December 1993
- Studio: Pink Studio
- Genre: Rock; Chanson; Folk rock
- Length: 43:45
- Label: UFA Media
- Producer: Đorđe Petrović

Đorđe Balašević chronology
Marim ja... (1991)	Jedan od onih života... (1993)	Na posletku... (1996)

Professional ratings
Review scores
Source	Rating
Branimir Lokner - Kritičko pakovanje	(favorable) link

Jedan od onih života... (trans. One of Those Lives...) is the eighth studio album released by Serbian and former Yugoslav musician Đorđe Balašević. The album cover also features the line "Muzika iz istoimenog romana" (Music from the novel of the same name), referring to Balašević's previously released novel Jedan od onih života. The album's main hits were the optimistic song "Ja luzer?" and songs inspired by war tragedies: "Čovek sa mesecom u očima" and "Krivi smo mi". "Provincijalka", a song that tells the story about Balašević and his wife Olivera's first meeting, is considered as some of Balašević's best work.

== Track listing ==
All the songs were written by Đorđe Balašević.

1. "Ja luzer?" (Me, A Loser?) – 4:26
2. "The Last March" – 4:15
3. "Krivi smo mi" (We Are To Blame) – 4:46
4. "Posvađana pesma" (The Quarrel Song) – 4:21
5. "Dan posle ponedeljka" (The Day After Monday) – 4:25
6. "Provincijalka" (Provincial Girl) – 4:50
7. "Portret mog života" (A Portrait Of My Life) – 4:21
8. "Stari laloški vals" (The Old Vojvodinian Waltz) – 5:28
9. "Čovek sa mesecom u očima" (The Man With The Moon In His Eyes) – 6:33

== Personnel ==
- Đorđe Balašević - vocals
- Aleksandar Dujin - piano
- Dušan Bezuha - guitar
- Đorđe Petrović - keyboard, producer
- Aleksandar Kravić - bass guitar
- Josip Kovač - saxophone
- Dragoljub Đuričić - drums
