= Celovečernji the Kid =

Studio album by Đorđe Balašević
- Released: December 5, 1983
- Genre: Rock
- Length: 40:08
- Label: PGP-RTB
- Producer: Josip Boček

Đorđe Balašević chronology
Pub (1982)	Celovečernji the Kid (1983)	003 (1985)

Celovečernji the Kid (trans. Featuring the Kid) is the second studio album released by Serbian and former Yugoslav singer-songwriter Đorđe Balašević.

The album is perhaps best remembered for the songs "Blues mutne vode", "Lunjo", and the ballads "Neko to od gore vidi sve" and "Svirajte mi Jesen stiže, dunjo moja" (the former referring to folk song "Jesen stiže, dunjo moja"), "Celovečernji The Kid" and "Don Francisco Long Play" feature the same mariachi-inspired music, "Celovečernji The Kid" featuring Serbian and "Don Francisco Long Play" featuring English language lyrics.

== Track listing ==
All songs written by Đorđe Balašević.

1. "Celovečernji The Kid" (Featuring The Kid) – 3:19
2. "Vi ste jedan običan miš" (You Are But An Ordinary Mouse) – 3:36
3. "Crni labud" (Black Swan) – 3:40
4. "Blues mutne vode" (Muddy Water Blues) – 3:59
5. "Svirajte mi 'Jesen stiže, dunjo moja'" (Play 'The Autumn Is Coming, My Dear' To Me) – 5:21
6. "Don Francisco Long Play" – 3:21
7. "Medena vremena" (Honey Times) – 3:41
8. "Lunjo" (Hey, Tramp) – 4:01
9. "Nikad kao Bane" (Never Like Bane) – 4:38
10. "Neko to od gore vidi sve" (Someone Sees It All From Up Above) – 4:32
