= Đorđe Balašević =

Serbian songwriter (1953–2021)

Đorđe Balašević Ђорђе Балашевић
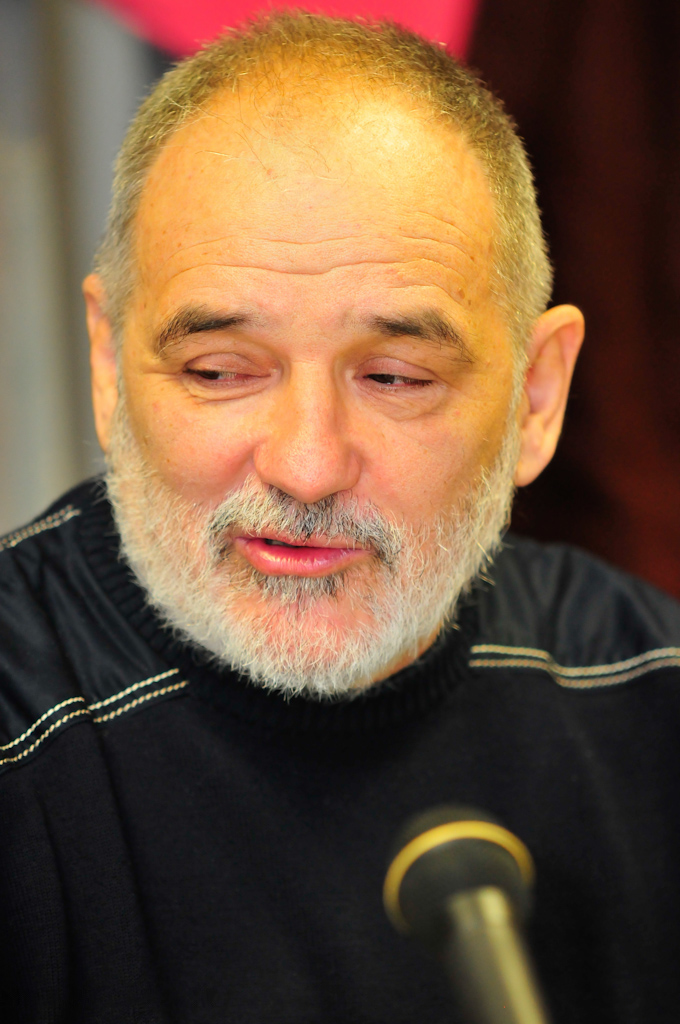
- Balašević in 2010

Background information
- Born: 11 May 1953; Novi Sad, PR Serbia, Yugoslavia
- Died: 19 February 2021 (aged 67) Novi Sad, Serbia
- Occupations: Singer; songwriter
- Years active: 1977–2021
- Musical career
- Genres: Chanson; country; folk rock; pop; soft rock
- Instruments: Vocals; guitar
- Labels: ZKP RTLJ; Jugoton; Aquarius Records; PGP-RTB; Diskoton; UFA Media; Hi-Fi Centar; Salayka
- Formerly of: Žetva; Rani Mraz; Apsolutno Romantično
- Website: balasevic.com

Đorđe Balašević (Serbian Cyrillic: Ђорђе Балашевић; 11 May 1953 – 19 February 2021) was a Serbian singer and songwriter, writer, poet and director. He began his career in the late 1970s as a member of the band Rani Mraz, transitioning after two albums to a solo career. He first gained mainstream prominence for writing Rani Mraz's hit "Računajte na nas" (Count on Us), which was often described as the anthem of a generation. Noted for his vivid lyricism and poetry, Balašević was also known for weaving political commentary into his songs and live performances.

Broadly supportive of South Slavic unity in the late 1970s and early 1980s, in the lead up to the Yugoslav wars he began to criticise the authorities. During the Yugoslav wars, he became a prominent anti-war voice in the region, thanks to which he also became a UNHCR Goodwill Ambassador. Balašević was the first Serbian act to perform in Sarajevo following the siege of Sarajevo. Balašević became one of the most prominent critics of Slobodan Milošević's regime, at considerable personal risk. Balašević was a prolific singer and writer, he recorded 14 albums and wrote 8 books during his career and has been characterised by media and commentators as a "musical legend" and author of many "evergreen hits".

== Early life ==
Balašević was born to a Serbian father Jovan, and mother Veronika Dolenec, half Hungarian and a half Croatian from Rasinja near Koprivnica, Croatia. He had a sister Jasna. His grandfather's surname was Balaš, but during World War II his grandfather changed it to Balašević in fear of being Magyarized.

The young Balašević grew up on Jovan Cvijić street in Novi Sad, in the same house where he lived until his death. He started writing poetry in primary school. He left Svetozar Marković Gymnasium in his third year, but managed to get a high school diploma as a correspondence student and passed the preliminary exam for geography at the Faculty of Sciences, University of Novi Sad. He never graduated from university, instead deciding to pursue a music career, and in 1977 he joined the band Žetva.

== Career ==
=== Early career: Žetva and Rani Mraz ===
After Balašević joined the group, Žetva recorded a humorous tango-oriented hit single "U razdeljak te ljubim" (I Lay a Kiss on Your Parting), which was sold in more than 180,000 copies. In 1978, he left Žetva and, together with Verica Todorović, formed the band Rani Mraz. The band had its debut at the 1978 music festival in Opatija with the song "Moja prva ljubav" (My First Love). During 1978, former Suncokret members Biljana Krstić and Bora Đorđević joined the band (forming the most famous Rani Mraz lineup), and together they recorded "Računajte na nas" (Count on Us), written by Balašević, a song which celebrated the youth's adoption of the communist revolution. The song became popular with both the communist authorities and the people, becoming an anthem of the Yugoslav youth. After just a few months of cooperation, Verica Todorović and Bora Đorđević left the band (Đorđević forming his famous hard rock band Riblja Čorba). Biljana Krstić and Balašević then recorded Rani Mraz's first album Mojoj mami umesto maturske slike u izlogu (To my Mom instead of Prom Photo in the Shop-Window) with the help of studio musicians.

At the 1979 Split Festival, Balašević won the first prize with the single "Panonski mornar" (Pannonian Sailor). A few months later, Rani Mraz sold out Belgrade's Dom Sindikata Hall eight times in a row. In 1980, Balašević served in the Yugoslav People's Army in Zagreb and Požarevac, where he had a role in the TV show Vojnici (Soldiers), but also found time to write song "Zbog tebe" (Because of You) for Zdravko Čolić and lyrics for several songs recorded on Srebrna krila album Ja sam samo jedan od mnogih s gitarom (I'm only One of Many with a Guitar).

By the end of 1980, Balašević and Krstić released their second and final album under the name Rani Mraz, with a symbolic title Odlazi cirkus (The Circus Is Leaving). The album reaffirmed Balašević's status and delivered several hit songs, one of them being "Priča o Vasi Ladačkom" (Story of Vasa Ladački) which went on to become one of Balašević's signature songs. However, Rani Mraz officially dissolved after that.

=== Solo career ===
==== 1980s ====
Balašević started his solo career in 1982 with the album Pub (Jack) which was well received, bringing hits "Boža zvani Pub" (Boža Known as the Jack), "Pesma o jednom petlu" (The Song about a Rooster), "Lepa protina kći" (Archpriest's Beautiful Daughter) and "Ratnik paorskog srca" (Warrior with a Peasant's Heart). The album was produced by Josip Boček, who would also produce Balašević's following two releases. Shortly after, Balašević had a role in the TV series Pop Ćira i pop Spira (Priest Ćira and Priest Spira), recorded after Stevan Sremac's novel of the same title. At the time, he wrote the song "Hej, čarobnjaci, svi su vam đaci" (Hey, Magicians, Everyone Can Learn from You) for the football club Red Star Belgrade.

In December 1983, Balašević released the album Celovečernji the Kid (Wholevening the Kid), which featured hits "Svirajte mi 'Jesen stiže, dunjo moja'" (Play 'Autumn Is Coming, My Dear' to Me), "Neko to od gore vidi sve" (Someone from up above Watches it All), "Blues mutne vode" (Muddy Water Blues), "Lunjo" (Hey, Tramp) and "Don Francisco Long Play". The following album, 003, was released in 1985, and brought hits "Slovenska" (The Slavic Song), "Al' se nekad dobro jelo" (Back Then Eating Was Good), "Badnje veče" (Christmas Eve) and "Olivera".

In 1986, Balašević released the album Bezdan (Abyss), which brought hits "Ne lomite mi bagrenje" (Don't Break My Locust Trees), "Bezdan" and "Ne volim januar" (I Don't Like January). The record was produced by Đorđe Petrović and arrangements were done by Aleksandar Dujin. Those two would be the key associates of Balašević in the following years. They became the backbone of Balašević's supporting band nicknamed The Unfuckables.

In 1987, Balašević released his first live album, double album U tvojim molitvama – Balade (In Your Prayers – Ballads). The album was recorded during 1986 and 1987 on his concerts in Zetra hall in Sarajevo, Ledena dvorana and Šalata in Zagreb, Sava Centar in Belgrade, and Studio M in Novi Sad. The album featured a gift 7-inch (18 cm) single with previously unreleased tracks "1987" and "Poluuspavanka" (Half-Lullaby). The album also featured previously unrecorded track "Samo da rata ne bude" (Just Let There be no War) which was recorded live with a large children's choir. On 19 July 1987, Balašević, alongside Parni Valjak, Leb i sol and Riblja Čorba, performed at Stadion Maksimir in Zagreb on the 1987 Summer Universiade closing ceremony.

Balašević's next studio album, Panta Rei, released in 1988. The song "Requiem" was dedicated to late Josip Broz Tito, while satire "Soliter" (High-rise) caricatures Yugoslavia as a building in which only façade still holds while foundations slide. Blues sound was present in the songs "Neki se rode kraj vode" (Some Were Born By the Water) and "Nemam ništa s tim" (I Have Nothing to Do with It). Balašević's following album, Tri posleratna druga (Three postwar Friends), was subtitled Muzika iz istoimenog romana (Music from the Novel of the Same Name), referring to his novel Tri posleratna druga. The album was recorded by Dujin, bass guitarist Aleksandar Kravić, and two musicians from Rijeka, guitarist Elvis Stanić (a former Linija 23, Denis & Denis, and Dr Doktor member) and drummer Tonči Grabušić. The album featured radio hits "Kad odem" (When I'm Gone) "D-moll" (D minor), "Ćaletova pesma" (Dad's Song), "Saputnik" (Fellow Traveler), "O. Bože" (Oh God), and folk-oriented "Devojka sa čardaš nogama" (A Girl with Csárdás Legs). The song "Sugar Rap" featured caricatured rap sound.

==== 1990s ====
The album Marim ja... (I care...) was released in 1991. Beside Balašević's old associates, the album featured Davor Rodik (pedal steel guitar), Nenad Jazunović (percussion), and Josip "Kiki" Kovač (violin). The songs "Nevernik" (The Nonbeliever), "Ringišpil" (Carousel), "Divlji badem" (Wild Almond) were the album's biggest hits.

As the Yugoslav Wars erupted, Balašević was forced to stop collaborating with Stanić and Grabušić (the two forming the jazz rock band Elvis Stanić Group). Balašević withdrew to isolation, partly due to his anti-war attitudes. His next album Jedan od onih života... (One of Those Lives...), released in 1993, featured Aleksandar Dujin on piano, Dušan Bezuha on guitar, Đorđe Petrović on keyboards, Aleksandar Kravić on bass guitar, Josip Kovač on saxophone, and Dragoljub Đuričić (formerly of YU grupa, Leb i Sol and Kerber) on drums. The songs such as "Krivi smo mi" (It's Our Fault) and "Čovek sa mesecom u očima" (The Man with the Moon in His Eyes) heavily criticized and denounced the ongoing war. At the same time, the compilation album Najveći hitovi (Greatest hits), featuring songs recorded during the 1986–1991 period, was released. The songs which appeared on the compilation were chosen by Balašević himself.

After a long break, at the beginning of 1996, he issued Naposletku... (In The End...). Beside Balašević's old associates, the album featured young drummer Petar Radmilović. Na posletku... was mainly folk rock-oriented. Nearly all instruments on the album are acoustic, with the violin becoming dominant and woodwind instruments heavily used. In 1997, the live album Da l' je sve bilo samo fol?, recorded on 6 December 1996 on a concert in Maribor, was released in Slovenia.

The album Devedesete (Nineties), self-released by Balašević in the spring of 2000, was his most politically involved album. The album was produced by Petrović, and, beside old associates, featured the saxophonist Gabor Bunford.

==== 2000s and 2010s ====
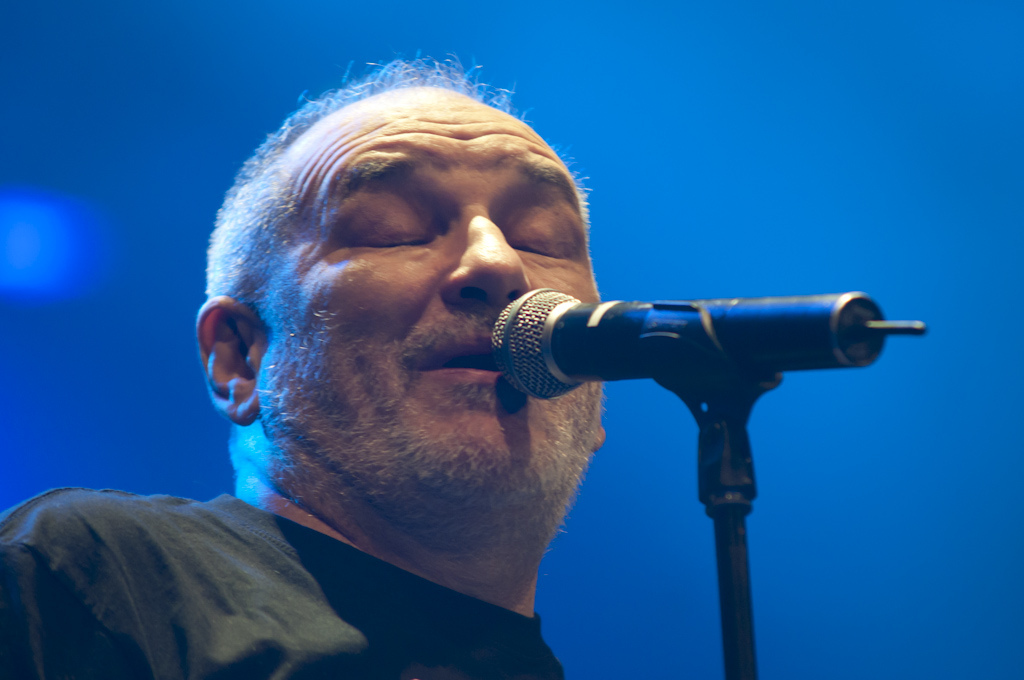
Balašević performing in Zagreb, December 2010

In 2001, Balašević released the album Dnevnik starog momka (Diary of an Old Bachelor). The album comprised 12 songs, each having a female name as its title. The song titles form the acrostic "Olja je najbolja" (Olja is the Best), Olja being the nickname of Balašević's wife Olivera Balašević. Balašević stated on several occasions that the girls the songs were named after are pure fiction. In 2002, the compilation album Ostaće okrugli trag na mestu šatre (trans. A Round Trace Will Remain at the Place where Tent Used to Be, named after a verse from the song "Odlazi cirkus") was released. The album featured the choice of songs from Balašević's solo career, with some of the older songs prerecorded.

Balašević released the songs that should have been the soundtrack for the film Goose Feather on the album Rani mraz. The album's subtitle was Priča o Vasi Ladačkom.../Muzika iz nesnimljenog filma (Story of Vasa Ladački.../Music from the Film that was not Filmed). The album featured folk rock sound similar to the one on Na posletku. The album featured rerecorded "Priča o Vasi Ladačkom" and the instrumental track based on it, "Pričica o Vasi L." (Short Story about Vasa L.). The album also featured the song "Maliganska", which Balašević wrote at the beginning of his career and unsuccessfully offered to Zvonko Bogdan, and which was previously released by pop rock/folk rock band Apsolutno Romantično under the title Đoletova pesma (Đole's Song). The album, beside old associates, featured Zoran and Pera Alvirović (of Apsolutno Romantično), Andrej Maglovski (accordion), Stevan Mošo (prim), Beni Ćibri (double bass), Agota Vitkai Kučera (soprano), St. George Choir, and others.

In 2010, Balašević directed the film Like An Early Frost (originally titled Kao rani mraz), starring Daniel Kovačević, Rade Šerbedžija and Balašević's daughter Jovana, based on the song "Priča o Vasi Ladačkom". The film received mostly negative reviews by the critics. In 2012, Balašević released six new songs among which are: "Berba '59." (Harvest of '59), "Ljubav ne pobeđuje" (Love Doesn't Win) and "Osmeh se vratio u grad" (Smile Returned to Town). In 2015, Balašević released a song "Duet" dedicated to Kemal Monteno who had died in January of that year. In 2016, Balašević released a song "Mala vidra sa Begeja" (Little otter from Bega river).

=== Concerts ===
His traditional New Year's concerts in Sava Center hall in Belgrade were traditionally sold out. He sold out Sava Center for the first time in the 1982/1983 season.

== Civic engagement ==
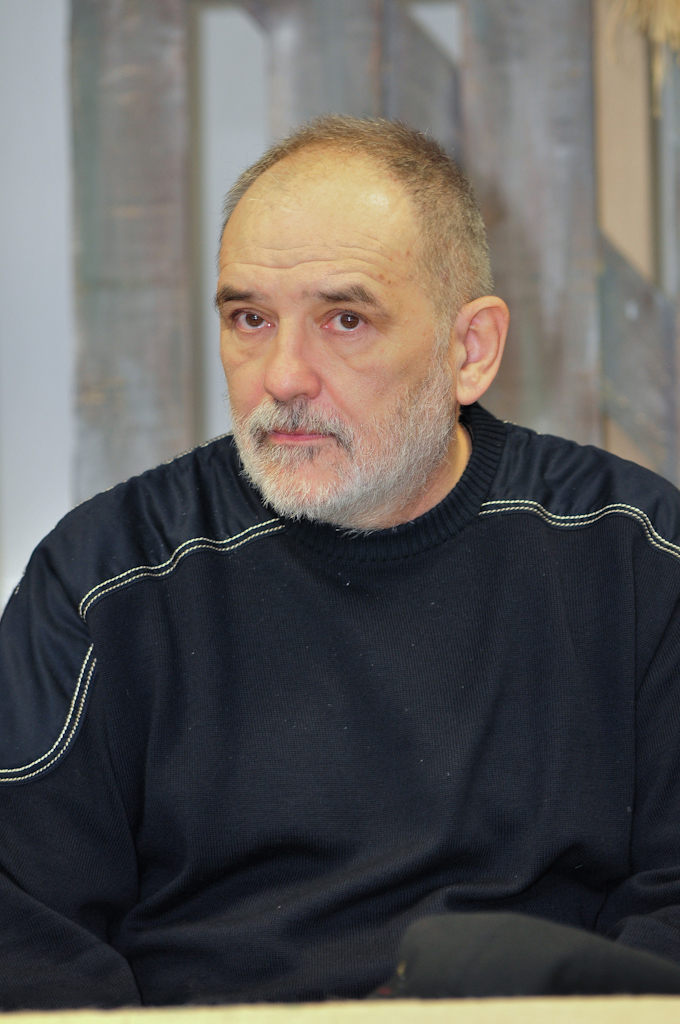
Balašević in 2010

After having released one of his early songs "Računajte na nas" (You Can Count on Us), Balašević was deemed politically involved. Together with another early single "Triput sam video Tita" (I Saw Tito Three Times), he was expressing support for Yugoslavism and Titoism. In 2018, he commented that "Yugoslavia wasn't much good - if it had been good it would not have fallen apart so bloodily".

During the second half of the 1980s, Balašević began to criticize the authorities, and in the early 1990s, his songs and stage speeches showed disillusionment and sadness over the fact that bloodshed was possible in the Yugoslavia he had once admired. He openly criticized the up-and-coming forms of ethnic nationalism in Serbia, Croatia, Bosnia and Slovenia.

In the ensuing war years, Balašević's career suffered due to his open conflict with the government of Slobodan Milošević. At that point, Balašević was one of only handful of public figures who had openly stated their opposition to Milošević's authoritarian regime. During his concert performances, he often criticized and mocked Milošević and other Serbian politicians. In 1996, he became the UNHCR Goodwill Ambassador for his antiwar statements during the Yugoslav Wars and held the first post-war concert in Sarajevo as the first Serbian artist visiting the war-torn Bosnia and Herzegovina.

In 2000, he took part in protests during and following the downfall of Slobodan Milošević. In 2006, after Montenegro had declared independence from the State Union of Serbia and Montenegro, Balašević sent a letter to then Prime Minister of Montenegro Milo Đukanović in which he congratulated Đukanović on the independence of Montenegro. He voted for Boris Tadić in the 2008 and the 2012 Serbian presidential election.

== Personal life ==
Balašević lived in Novi Sad in the same house where he grew up, with his wife Olivera (born Savić in Zrenjanin), who was a ballerina and a member of the national gymnastics team, and their three children; daughters Jovana (an actress, born in 1980) and Jelena (born in 1984), and son Aleksa (born in 1994). He had married Olivera on 7 May 1981 in Novi Sad. On 14 November 2019, Balašević suffered a myocardial infarction. For most of his life, he declared himself as a Yugoslav.

== Death ==
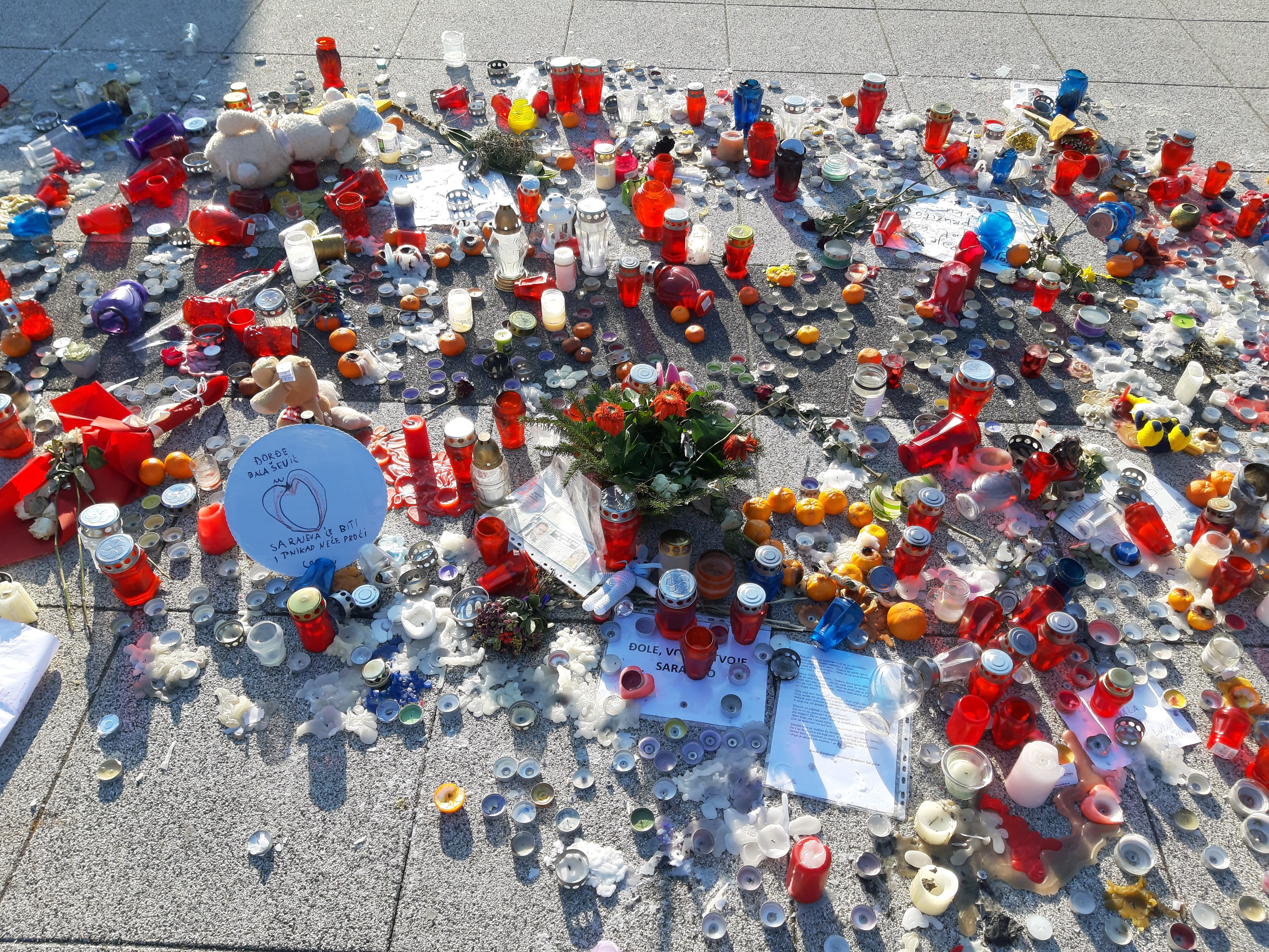
Mourning site of Balašević located in Sarajevo after his death

Balašević died on 19 February 2021, in Novi Sad from complications of pneumonia, caused by COVID-19. On 22 February 2021, an event called Noć kada je Đole preplivao Dunav (eng. The night when Đole swam the Danube) was organized in Novi Sad in memory of him. One of the participants was the Serbian National Theater choir.

== Legacy ==
The 1998 book YU 100: najbolji albumi jugoslovenske rok i pop muzike (YU 100: The Best albums of Yugoslav pop and rock music) features two Đorđe Balašević solo albums, Bezdan (ranked No. 25) and Pub (ranked No. 66), and one Rani Mraz album, Mojoj mami umesto maturske slike u izlogu (ranked No. 44).

In 2000, the song "Slovenska" polled No. 69 on the Rock Express Top 100 Yugoslav Rock Songs of All Times list. In 2006, the song "Priča o Vasi Ladačkom" polled No. 13 B92 Top 100 Domestic Songs list. In 2011, the song "Menuet" was polled, by the listeners of Radio 202, one of 60 greatest songs released by PGP-RTB/PGP-RTS during the sixty years of the label's existence.

In 2007, twenty-one bands from Balašević's native Novi Sad, including Zbogom Brus Li, Pero Defformero, Super s Karamelom and others, recorded a tribute album to Balašević entitled Neki noviji klinci i.... In 2012, singer-songwriter and former Azra leader Branimir "Johnny" Štulić released a cover of "U razdeljak te ljubim" on his official YouTube channel.

In 2016, the sketch show Državni posao created an episode which was based on Balašević's song Sugar Rap. On 17 January 2020, Državni posao aired an episode which referred to concerts which Balašević had traditionally held on the Epiphany (19 January).

Only nine days before Balašević's death, Državni posao aired an episode named after his song "Računajte na nas". Within a week of his passing, Državni posao aired an episode named after Balašević's song Odlazi cirkus.

Even after the Yugoslav wars of the 1990s, Balašević had remained immensely popular and well-liked not only in Serbia but throughout all former Yugoslav republics. News of his death was widely reported by the Croatian and Bosnian media, with Bosnian web portal Klix.ba describing Balašević as a "legendary" performer whose songs could "inspire deepest emotions." In his hometown of Novi Sad, hundreds of people gathered on a vigil, and similar spontaneous fan gatherings occurred in Zagreb, Pula, Sarajevo, and other cities across the region. The Mayor of Novi Sad, Miloš Vučević declared 21 February a day of mourning.

== Discography ==
=== With Rani Mraz ===
- Mojoj mami umesto maturske slike u izlogu (1979)
- Odlazi cirkus (1980)

=== Solo ===
- Pub (1982)
- Celovečernji The Kid (1983)
- 003 (1985)
- Bezdan (1986)
- Panta Rei (1988)
- Tri posleratna druga (1989)
- Marim ja... (1991)
- Jedan od onih života... (1993)
- Naposletku... (1996)
- Devedesete (2000)
- Dnevnik starog momka (2001)
- Rani mraz (2004)

== Bibliography ==
- Računajte na nas – book of poems
- I život ide dalje – collection of columns
- Jedan od onih života – novel
- Dodir svile (1998) – book of poems
- Tri posleratna druga – novel
- ...i od dva-tri akorda (jer ni ne umem bolje ja...) – book of poems
- Kao rani mraz – screenplay based on which a movie with the same name was filmed
- Kalendar mog detinjstva – novel
