= Pub (Đorđe Balašević album) =

Studio album by Đorđe Balašević
- Released: 7 April 1982
- Genre: Rock; Folk-rock
- Length: 34:17
- Label: PGP-RTB
- Producer: Josip Boček

Đorđe Balašević chronology
Odlazi cirkus (1980)	Pub (1982)	Celovečernji the Kid (1983)

Professional ratings
Review scores
Source	Rating
Rock 82	Mixed

Pub (trans. Jack) is the first solo album released by Serbian and former Yugoslav singer-songwriter Đorđe Balašević. The album was produced by Josip Boček, who played guitar as well.

The album featured the songs such as "Ratnik paorskog srca" which tells of a peasant who returns from World War I and who "wasn't made to be a soldier", "Za sve je kriv Toma Sojer" which tells of three boys which ran away from home influenced by The Adventures of Tom Sawyer, "Boža zvani Pub" which tells of a legendary gambler nicknamed Pub (Jack), romantic ballad "Lepa protina kći" ("Beautiful Priest's Daughter"), social poem "Za treću smenu" ("For the Third Shift") and existential ballad "Na pola puta" ("Halfway Point"). All the aforementioned songs went on to become his and Balašević's signature pieces, but among them (especially at the time) was another: the track "Pesma o jednom petlu", which tells a story of an old man's younger days in the farm-rich area of Vojvodina when he had a pet rooster. The rooster is widely assumed to be a metaphor for his male sexual organ for which female birds tend to go crazy. The lyrics go on to list different kinds of female birds which in turn depict stereotypical characteristics of women in Serbian slang. The refrain line "Princip je isti, sve su ostalo nijanse" ("The principle is same, everything else are details") is referring to the way of courting the opposite sex. The lyrics conclude in the man's later years as he misses the good times gone by and giving advice never to make your rooster suffer, to let him fly around so that female birds can see him, for afterwards it will be too late, because even roosters age.

Serbian rock critic Petar Peca Popović made the following comment in his Džuboks review of the album:

Đorđe Balašević was and still remains a masterful poet with a simply unbelievable gift for conjuring all the diversity of Vojvodina's clashes of culture, mentalities, customs and characters in a way that does not offend anybody, yet leaves nobody indifferent.

The album was polled in 1998 as the 66th on the list of 100 greatest Yugoslav rock and pop albums in the book YU 100: najbolji albumi jugoslovenske rok i pop muzike (YU 100: The Best albums of Yugoslav pop and rock music).

== Track listing ==
All songs written by Đorđe Balašević.

1. "Ilona" – 3:42
2. "Ratnik paorskog srca" (A Warrior with a Peasant's Heart) – 4:37
3. "Za sve je kriv Toma Sojer" (It's All Tom Sawyer's Fault) – 3:17
4. "Za treću smenu" (For Third Shift) – 3:32
5. "Lepa protina kći" (The Archpriest's Beautiful Daughter) – 3:22
6. "Pesma o jednom petlu" (The Song About A Rooster) – 3:30
7. "Boža zvani Pub" (Boža Called The Jack) – 4:04
8. "Predlog" (Suggestion) – 3:17
9. "Na pola puta" (Halfway) – 4:56
