= U tvojim molitvama – Balade =

Live album by Đorđe Balašević
- Released: December 1987
- Recorded: November, December 1986, May, July 1987
- Genre: Rock
- Length: 96:59
- Label: PGP RTB
- Producer: Đorđe Petrović

Đorđe Balašević chronology
Bezdan (1986)	U tvojim molitvama – Balade (1987)	Panta Rei (1988)

U tvojim molitvama – Balade (trans. In Your Prayers – Ballads) is the first live album by Serbian and former Yugoslav singer-songwriter Đorđe Balašević. Recorded during Balašević's concert in Zetra (Sarajevo, November 1986), Ledena dvorana (Zagreb, November 1986), Sava Centar (Belgrade, December 1986), Studio M (Novi Sad, May 1987) and Šalata (Zagreb, July 1987), the album features live versions of Balašević's ballads. Some tracks feature Balašević's humorous monologues, and the tracks "Ne volim januar" and "Bezdan" feature recordings of Balašević's guest appearance in the Radio Novi Sad show Pop Ekspres. The album features the previously unrecorded "Samo da rata ne bude", recorded with a children's choir. The song lyrics warn about the war (which indeed will start three years later), delivering a hymn of pacifists throughout then still existing SFR Yugoslavia.

== Track listing ==
All tracks are written by Đ. Balašević

A Side
No.	Title	Length
1.	"Ne volim januar" (Recorded live at Zetra, Sarajevo, November 1986)
2.	"Bezdan" (Recorded live at Zetra, Sarajevo, November 1986)
3.	"Olivera" (Recorded live at Studio M, Novi Sad, May 1987)
4.	"Slow Motion" (Recorded live at Šalata, Zagreb, July 1987)

B Side
No.	Title	Length
1.	"Samo da rata ne bude" (Recorded live at Studio M, Novi Sad, May 1987)
2.	"Neki novi klinci" (Recorded live at Šalata, Zagreb, July 1987)
3.	"Ne lomite mi bagrenje" (Recorded live at Sava Centar, Belgrade, December 1986)

C Side
No.	Title	Length
1.	"Protina kći" (Recorded live at Ledena dvorana, Zagreb, November 1986)
2.	"Priča o Vasi Ladačkom" (Recorded live at Ledena dvorana, Zagreb, November 1986)
3.	"Život je more" (Recorded live at Ledena dvorana, Zagreb, November 1986)
4.	"Slovenska" (Recorded live at Ledena dvorana, Zagreb, November 1986)

D Side
No.	Title	Length
1.	"Neko to odgore vidi sve" (Recorded live at Studio M, Novi Sad, May 1987)
2.	"Prva ljubav" (Recorded live at Studio M, Novi Sad, May 1987)
3.	"Svirajte mi: Jesen stiže dunjo moja" (recorded live at Zetra, Sarajevo, November 1986)
4.	"Odlazi Cirkus" (Recorded live at Studio M, Novi Sad, May 1987)

Bonus single
No.	Title	Length
1.	"1987" (Recorded at Sudio 5 PGP-RTB, Radio Novi Sad, Autumn 1987)
2.	"Poluuspavanka" (Recorded at Sudio 5 PGP-RTB, Radio Novi Sad, Autumn 1987)

== Personnel ==
- Đorđe Balašević – vocals
- Dragan Jovanović – guitar (tracks: A1 to B3, D1 to D4)
- Elvis Stanić – guitar (tracks: C1 to C4)
- Aleksandar Kravić – bass guitar
- Aleksandar Dujin – keyboards
- Miroslav Karlović – drums
