= Naposletku... =

Na posletku...

Studio album by Đorđe Balašević
- Released: June 19, 1996
- Recorded: 1996
- Genre: Folk rock Chanson
- Length: 52:42
- Label: UFA Media – ZMEX

Đorđe Balašević chronology
Jedan od onih života... (1993)	Na posletku... (1996)	Da l' je sve bilo samo fol? (1997)

Naposletku... (trans. In The End...) is the ninth studio album released by Serbian and former Yugoslav singer-songwriter Đorđe Balašević. Featuring only acoustic instruments, Naposletku... is Balašević's first completely folk rock-oriented album. Similar sound would be featured on Balašević's 2004 album Rani mraz.

== Track listing ==
All the songs were written by Đorđe Balašević.

1. "Naposletku" (In The End) – 5:46
2. "Dođoška" (The Immigrant) – 4:16
3. "Namćor" (Grumpy Man) – 5:34
4. "Regruteska" (The Recruitesque) – 7:18
5. "Poslednja nevesta" (The Last Bride) – 4:10
6. "Miholjsko leto" (Indian Summer) – 4:47
7. "Sin jedinac" (The Only Son) – 4:47
8. "Drvena pesma" (Wooden Song) – 5:59
9. "Uspavanka za dečaka" (Lullaby for a Boy) – 4:19

== Personnel ==
- Đorđe Balašević – vocals
- Aleksandar Dujin – piano
- Dušan Bezuha – guitar
- Đorđe Petrović – keyboard, string arrangements, producer
- Aleksandar Kravić – bass guitar
- Josip Kovač – saxophone
- Petar Radmilović – drums
- Gudači Svetog Đorđa – strings
- Ignac Šen – Violin (on "Naposletku" and "Poslednja nevesta" )
- Josip Kiki Kovač – soprano sax (on "Namćor" and "Uspavanka za dečaka")
- Goran Marinković – bassoon (on "Drvena pesma")
- Nenad Marinković – oboe (on "Drvena pesma")
- Dragan Kozarčić – trumpet (on "Regruteska")
- Aleksandra Stojanović – sound engineer
