= Da l' je sve bilo samo fol? =

Live album by Đorđe Balašević
- Released: 1997
- Recorded: 1996
- Genre: Rock; Folk rock
- Length: 64:20
- Label: D Moll

Đorđe Balašević chronology
Na posletku... (1996)	Da l' je sve bilo samo fol? (1997)	Devedesete (2000)

Da l' je sve bilo samo fol? (trans. Was Everything just Pretending?) is the second live album by Serbian and former Yugoslav singer-songwriter Đorđe Balašević. The album was recorded during Balašević's concert in Maribor, Slovenia, on December 6, 1996, which was one of Balašević's second concert in this former Yugoslav republic after the breakup of Yugoslavia.

== Track listing ==
1. "Neki novi klinci" – 5:38
2. "Govor I" – 3:14
3. "Slovenska" – 5:04
4. "Svirajte mi Jesen stiže dunjo moja" – 6:17
5. "Prva ljubav" – 5:59
6. "Devojka sa čardaš nogama" – 4:08
7. "Govor II" – 2:00
8. "Slabo divanim ..." – 4:20
9. "Menuet" – 6:03
10. "Provincijalka" – 4:54
11. "Ćaletova pesma" – 5:11
12. "Život je more" – 3:36
13. "Miholjsko leto" – 4:49
14. "Boža zvani Pub" – 3:07

== Personnel ==
- Đorđe Balašević – vocals
- Đorđe Petrović – keyboard
- Aleksandar Dujin – piano
- Dušan Bezuha – guitar
- Alekandar Kravić – bass guitar
- Josip Kovač – violin, saxophone
- Petar Radmilović – drums
