= Mojoj mami umesto maturske slike u izlogu =

Studio album by Rani Mraz
- Released: 1979
- Genre: Rock; Pop rock
- Length: 31:04
- Label: PGP-RTB
- Producer: Josip Boček

Rani Mraz chronology
Mojoj mami umesto maturske slike u izlogu (1979)	Odlazi cirkus (1980)

Mojoj mami umesto maturske slike u izlogu (trans. To My Mother instead of the Prom Photo in the Shop Window) is the first studio album released by former Yugoslav rock band Rani Mraz.

In 1998, the album was polled as the 44th on the list of 100 greatest Yugoslav rock and pop albums in the book YU 100: najbolji albumi jugoslovenske rok i pop muzike (YU 100: The Best albums of Yugoslav pop and rock music).

== Recording ==
Before the album recording Rani Mraz went through several lineup changes, and at the time of the recording, Đorđe Balašević and Biljana Krstić were the only official members of the band, so Mojoj mami umesto maturske slike u izlogu was recorded with studio musicians: bass guitarist Bojan Hreljac, drummer Vladimir Furduj, keyboardist Sloba Mаrković and saxophonist Mića Marković. Being a fan of Korni Grupa, Balašević entrusted the production to Korni Grupa former member Josip Boček, who also played guitar on the album. The album also featured violinist Jovan Kolundžija, on the track "Sve je dobro kad se dobro svrši".

== Track listing ==
All songs written by Đorđe Balašević, except where noted.

No.	Title	Lyrics	Music	Length
1.	"Uvod" ("Intro")			1:27
2.	"Sve je dobro, kad se dobro svrši" ("All's Well that Ends Well")			2:20
3.	"Drago mi je zbog mog starog" ("I'm Glad for My Old Man")			2:55
4.	"Jedan Saša iz voza" ("One Saša from the Train")			3:06
5.	"Uticaj rođaka na moj životni put" ("Influence of Relatives on My Life's Path")			3:11
6.	"Mnogo mi znači to" ("It Means a Lot to Me")			2:51
7.	"Neki novi klinci" ("Some New Kids")			4:14
8.	"Stara pesma" ("Old Song")	Đ. Balašević, D. Toković	Đ. Balašević, D. Toković	2:14
9.	"Moj stari frend ima Rock and Roll band" ("My Old Friend Has Got a Rock and Roll Band")			2:10
10.	"Brakolomac" ("Marriage Breaker")			3:04
11.	"Prodaje se prijatelj" ("A Friend for Sale")			3:32

== Reissues ==
The album was rereleased on CD in 1999 by the Slovenian record label Taped Pictures. The Taped Pictures release featured three bonus tracks from Žetva (Balašević's former band) and Rani Mraz 7-inch singles: "U razdeljak te ljubim" ("I Lay a Kiss on Your Parting"), "Prva ljubav" ("First Love") and "Računajte na nas" ("Count on Us").

== Legacy ==
In 1998, the album was polled as the 44th on the list of 100 greatest Yugoslav rock and pop albums in the book YU 100: najbolji albumi jugoslovenske rok i pop muzike (YU 100: The Best albums of Yugoslav pop and rock music).

== Personnel ==
- Đorđe Balašević - vocals
- Biljana Krstić - vocals

=== Additional personnel ===
- Josip Boček - guitar
- Bojan Hreljac - bass guitar
- Vladimir Furduj - drums
- Sloba Marković - keyboard
- Mića Marković - saxophone
- Jovan Kolundžija - violin
