= 003 (album) =

Studio album by Đorđe Balašević
- Released: 26 April 1985
- Genre: Rock; Folk rock Acoustic rock
- Length: 34:01
- Label: PGP-RTB
- Producer: Josip Boček

Đorđe Balašević chronology
Celovečernji the Kid (1983)	003 (1985)	Bezdan (1986)

003 is the third studio album released by Serbian and former Yugoslav singer-songwriter Đorđe Balašević.

While 003 featured the same poetics as Balašević's earlier albums, a marked change was its political stance, most prominently showcased by the album's cover. On the background collage of newspaper clippings about financial crime, loans and price hikes, an illustration of three wise monkeys provided Balašević's comment on the ongoing political and social turmoil in the country.

A year after its release, Balašević commented on the album:

Initially, the songs I didn't care about, "Al' se nekad dobro jelo" and "Baby Blue", received airplay, and "Slovenska" was discovered only later. Today, this record is remembered only for "Slovenska", because that's a real song.

He remarked that "Slovenska" was the first song on the album that came across his mind, but was the last to be finished. It was written and recorded in one day, which was also the last day in the recording studio.

== Track listing ==
All tracks are written by Đorđe Balašević.

No.	Title	Length
1.	"Noć kad sam preplivao Dunav (The Night I Swam Across The Danube)"	3:58
2.	"Baby Blue"	2:48
3.	"Morao sam da se odselim (I Had To Move Away)"	3:41
4.	"Bela lađa (White Ship)"	2:59
5.	"Al' se nekad dobro jelo (The Food Was Good Back Then)"	3:52
6.	"Slovenska (The Slavic Song)"	4:39
7.	"Mani me se, lepa Nasto (Don't Bother Me, Pretty Nasta)"	2:41
8.	"Olivera"	3:26
9.	"Put u središte zemlje (Journey to the Center of the Earth)"	2:45
10.	"Badnje veče (Christmas Eve)"	3:18

== Legacy ==
In 2015 003 album cover was ranked 42nd on the list of 100 Greatest Album Covers of Yugoslav Rock published by web magazine Balkanrock.
