= Rani Mraz =

Yugoslav rock band

- The most famous Rani Mraz lineup, in 1978; from left to right: Bilja Krstić, Verica Todorović, Đorđe Balašević, Bora Đorđević

Background information
- Origin: Novi Sad, SR Serbia, SFR Yugoslavia
- Genres: Pop rock, rock
- Years active: 1977–1981
- Labels: Jugoton, PGP-RTB
- Past members: Đorđe Balašević; Verica Todorović; Vladimir Knežević; Bora Đorđević; Biljana Krstić; Aleksandar Dujin; Aleksandar Kravić

Rani Mraz (Serbian Cyrillic: Рани Мраз; trans. Early Frost) were a Yugoslav rock band from Novi Sad, formed in 1977 by former Žetva member Đorđe Balašević. During the initial period, the band went through several lineup changes, until Balašević and female singer Biljana Krstić remained the only official members of the band. The two released two studio albums under the name Rani Mraz, before officially dissolving in 1981.

== Band history ==
Rani Mraz was formed at the end of 1977 by former Žetva members Đorđe Balašević and female vocalist Verica Todorović. The first lineup of the band also featured the guitarist Vladimir Knežević "Knez". The band had their first public appearance in December 1977 at the Sportsman of the Year Award ceremony, held in Belgrade's Pionir Hall, where they performed Žetva hit "U razdeljak te ljubim" ("I Lay a Kiss on Your Parting"), with alternative lyrics and entitled "U levicu te ljubim" ("I Lay a Kiss on Your Left Hand"), dedicating it to boxer Mate Parlov. Soon after, Balašević was invited to appear in Radio Novi Sad, to record one of his songs, which would represent Radio Novi Sad on the 1978 Opatija Festival. The song chosen was "Moja prva ljubav" ("My First Love"), and it was recorded with the members of the band Neoplanti, as Rani Mraz was still lacking members. The single cover featured, beside Balašević, Todorović and Knežević, Balašević's friend Slobodan Pavković, a football player at the time playing for FK Vojvodina. Although Rani Mraz did not win the festival, the song became a hit, and the single, released by Jugoton, was sold in more than 130,000 copies.

The band was invited to perform for the president Josip Broz Tito, and for this occasion Balašević wrote "Računajte na nas" ("Count on Us"), a song which praised People's Liberation War from a slightly different perspective than habitual socialist realism. With this song, Balašević appeared at the Omladinski festival in Subotica. Soon after, on suggestion of journalist Peca Popović, former Suncokret members Bora Đorđević and Biljana Krstić joined the band, becoming the members of the most famous, but short lasting Rani Mraz lineup. This lineup of the band recorded "Računajte na nas" and released it as a single, with the song "Strašan žulj" ("Awful Blister") as the B-Side. "Računajte na nas" soon became a hit and an anthem of Yugoslav youth. The readers of the Džuboks magazine voted "Računajte na nas" the Single of the Year, and Balašević was voted third on the list of Composers of the Year (behind Goran Bregović and Radomir Mihajlović). During the summer of 1978, Rani Mraz held numerous concerts in Belgrade's Dom omladine. Balašević entertained the audience with his humorous stories and Đorđević performed his songs "Lutka sa naslovne strane" ("Doll on the Front Cover"), "Mirno spavaj" ("Sleep Peacefully"), "Zvezda potkrovlja i suterena" ("Star of Attics and Basements") and others. After recording the songs "Oprosti mi Katrin" ("Forgive Me, Catherine") and "Život je more" ("Life Is a Sea"), Bora Đorđević left the band, forming the hard rock band Riblja Čorba (which eventually became one of the top acts of the former Yugoslav rock scene). The band was joined by the keyboardist Aleksandar Dujin "Duja" and the bass guitarist Aleksandar Kravić "Caki". Soon after, Balašević recorded his first solo release "Ljubio sam snašu na salašu" ("I Kissed the Girl on the Farm"), and Rani Mraz released the single with songs "Oprosti mi, Katrin" and "Život je more". During the summer Balašević appeared on the Evening of Free Forms of the 24th Zagreb Festival, both as a singer-songwriter, with the song "Marina", and as an author, with the song "Život je jednosmerna cesta" ("Life Is a One-Way Road"), performed by Jadranka Stojaković.

In 1979, Rani Mraz released their debut album Mojoj mami umesto maturske slike u izlogu (To my Mom instead of a Prom Photo in the Shop-Window). Just before the start of the recording, Verica Todorović left the band (later continuing her career as a folk singer), so Krstić and Balašević remained the only two official members of the band. The album was recorded with studio musicians: Bojan Hreljac (bass guitar), Vladimir Furduj (drums), Sloba Marković (keyboard) and Mića Marković (saxophone). The album was produced by Josip Boček, who also played the guitar. The album featured hits "Sve je dobro kad se dobro svrši" ("All's Well that Ends Well"), "Mnogo mi znači to" ("It Means a Lot to Me"), "Neki novi klinci" ("Some New Kids") and "Drago mi je zbog mog starog" ("I'm Glad for My Old Man"). During the summer, Đorđe Balašević and Biljana Krstić, with the band Neoplanti, held numerous concerts across Yugoslavia. At this time, Balašević started performing his well-known humorous monologues. Poets Mika Antić and Pero Zubac made guest appearances on some of Rani Mraz concerts. On the Split music festival, Balašević won the first place with the song "Panonski mornar" ("Pannonian Sailor"). In September, Rani Mraz held eight sold out concerts in Belgrade's Dom Sindikata. At the end of the year, the single "Prvi januar – popodne" ("January 1 – Afternoon") was released, although the 7-inch vinyl mistakenly featured the song as the B-side, and the song "Lagana stvar" ("Slow Tune") as the A-side.

During the spring of 1980, before Balašević's departure to the army, Rani Mraz started their work on their second album. Odlazi cirkus (The Circus Is Leaving), the second and the last album under the name Rani Mraz, was released in November 1980. The album featured hits "Priča o Vasi Ladačkom" ("The Story of Vasa Ladački"), "Mirka", and "Menuet" ("Minuet"). During his service in the army Balašević released the single "Triput sam video Tita" ("I Saw Tito Three Times"), deciding to start a solo career after his return from the army.

In 1982, Balašević released Pub (Jack), the album with which he started his official solo career. Biljana Krstić started her solo career in 1983, with the album Prevari noćas svoje društvo sa mnom (Cheat on Your Friends with Me Tonight).

== Legacy ==
The album Mojoj mami umesto maturske slike u izlogu was polled in 1998 as the 44th on the list of 100 greatest Yugoslav popular music albums in the book YU 100: najbolji albumi jugoslovenske rok i pop muzike (YU 100: The Best albums of Yugoslav pop and rock music).

In 2006, the song "Priča o Vasi Ladačkom" was ranked No. 13 on the B92 Top 100 Domestic Songs List. In 2011, the song "Menuet" was polled, by the listeners of Radio 202, one of 60 greatest songs released by PGP-RTB/PGP-RTS during the sixty years of the label's activity.

== Discography ==
=== Studio albums ===
- Mojoj mami umesto maturske slike u izlogu (1979)
- Odlazi cirkus (1980)

=== Singles ===
- "Moja prva ljubav" / "Kristifore, crni sine" (1978)
- "Računajte na nas" / "Strašan žulj" (1978)
- "Oprosti mi Katrin" / "Život je more" (1978)
- "Panonski mornar" / "Moja draga sad je u Japanu" (1979)
- "Lagana stvar" / "Prvi januar (popodne)" (1979)
- "Tri puta sam video Tita" (1981)
