= Odlazi cirkus =

Studio album by Rani Mraz
- Released: 1980
- Genre: Rock; Pop rock
- Length: 41:57
- Label: PGP-RTB
- Producer: Josip Boček

Rani Mraz chronology
Mojoj mami umesto maturske slike u izlogu (1979)	Odlazi cirkus (1980)

Repress cover

Odlazi cirkus (trans. The Circus Is Leaving) is the second and final studio album released by former Yugoslav rock band Rani Mraz.

== Recording ==
As was the case with the previous record, two official Rani Mraz members, Đorđe Balašević and Biljana Krstić, recorded Odlazi cirkus with producer Josip Boček who played all guitars, plus studio musicians in Bojan Hreljac (bass guitar), Slobodan Marković (keyboards) and Lazar Tošić (drums).

== Track listing ==
All songs written by Đorđe Balašević.

No.	Title	Length
1.	"Priča o Vasi Ladačkom" ("The Story of Vasa Ladački")	5:48
2.	"Još jedna gorka pesma" ("Another Bitter Song")	3:40
3.	"Nisam bio ja za nju" ("I Wasn't for Her")	3:24
4.	"Menuet" ("Minuet")	3:29
5.	"Život je more" ("Life Is a Sea")	3:25
6.	"Pa dobro, gde si ti" ("Well, Where Have You Been")	3:51
7.	"Mirka"	4:13
8.	"O, kako tužnih ljubavi ima" ("Oh, How Sad Love Stories There Are")	4:07
9.	"Ostaje mi to što se volimo" ("I'm Left with Our Love for Each Other")	4:33
10.	"Odlazi cirkus" ("The Circus Is Leaving")	3:04

== Personnel ==
- Đorđe Balašević - vocals
- Bilja Krstić - vocals

=== Additional personnel ===
- Josip Boček - guitar
- Bojan Hreljac - bass guitar
- Slobodan Marković - keyboards
- Lazar Tošić - drums

== Legacy ==
The main album hits were "Mirka", "Pa dobro gde si ti", the ballads "Menuet", "Život je more", "Odlazi cirkus" and "Priča o Vasi Ladačkom", the last one going on to become one of Đorđe Balašević's signature pieces.

In 2006 "Priča o Vasi Ladačkom" was polled, by the listeners of Radio B92, #13 on the B92 Top 100 Domestic Songs list. In 2011, the song "Menuet" was polled, by the listeners of Radio 202, one of 60 greatest songs released by PGP-RTB/PGP-RTS during the sixty years of the label's activity.
