= Radio Television of Vojvodina =

Regional broadcaster in the Serbian province of Vojvodina

Radio Television of Vojvodina Радио-телевизија Војводине (Serbian) Radio-televizija Vojvodine (Serbian) Vajdasági Rádió és Televízió (Hungarian) Rádio-televízia Vojvodiny (Slovak) Radioteleviziunea Voivodinei (Romanian) Радио-Телевизия Войводини (Pannonian Rusyn)
- RTV logo with inscription in Serbian Cyrillic and Latin alphabet
- Type: Radio, television and online
- Country: Serbia
- Availability: Regional (Vojvodina)
- Founded: 26 May 2006; 20 years ago (Current form); 29 November 1949; 76 years ago (Original)
- Market share: 0.40% (TV advert, 2014–15); 1.27% (TV rating, 2014–15) <1.00% (Radio rating, 2014–15)
- Revenue: ▲€18.06 million (2017)
- Net income: ▼ (€1.11 million) (2017)
- Headquarters: Kamenicki put 45, Novi Sad
- Broadcast area: Serbia
- Owner: Provincial Government of Vojvodina
- Key people: Jozef Klem (General Director)
- Launch date: 29 November 1949 (Radio); 26 November 1975 (Television)
- Former names: TVNS, RTS NS
- Digital channel: RTV 1, RTV 2
- Radio stations: RNS 1, RNS 2, RNS 3, Oradio
- Official website: www.rtv.rs

Radio Television of Vojvodina (Note: Serbian Cyrillic: Радио-телевизија Војводине, Serbian: Radio-televizija Vojvodine, Hungarian: Vajdasági Rádió és Televízió, Slovak: Rádio-televízia Vojvodiny, Romanian: Radioteleviziunea Voivodinei, Rusyn: Радіо Телебачення Воєводини; abbr. РТВ/RTV) (RTV) is the regional public broadcaster in the Serbian province of Vojvodina, headquartered in Novi Sad. Alongside statewide Radio Television of Serbia, RTV serves as the second major public broadcaster in the country. The radio service began in 1949, and the television service launched in 1975. RTV broadcasts in multiple languages, including Serbian, Hungarian, Slovak, Croatian, Romanian, and Rusyn, later adding Romani.

RTV was initially known as Radio Novi Sad, established by the Assembly of Vojvodina's Chief Executive Committee (Government of Vojvodina). During the 1990s, RTV became part of the centralized Radio Television of Serbia (RTS) but maintained its multilingual programming. In 1999, NATO bombed the RTNS studios, leading to their relocation. The 2002 Broadcasting Act established RTV as a distinct public broadcaster, and in 2006, it was legally separated from RTS. Alongside its primary area of Vojvodina, RTV is available in Belgrade, the northern part of Central Serbia, as well as in borderland areas of neighbouring countries. It is available on cable TV for all areas in Serbia.

== History ==
=== SFR Yugoslavia ===
Contemporary Radio Television of Vojvodina began as Radio Novi Sad in 1949 following a decision by the Assembly of Vojvodina's Chief Executive Committee (Government of Vojvodina). The radio station broadcast its programs in five languages: Serbo-Croatian, Hungarian, Slovak, Romanian, and Rusyn. With its multilingual program which included modern music and broadcasting mostly free of ideological concerns, the station earned reputation beyond Vojvodina and Yugoslavia in wider Cold War Eastern Europe.

The original logo of Radio Television Novi Sad featured five rainbow colours, symbolizing the diverse ethnic and linguistic heritage of Vojvodina. In 1971, the workers’ community council decided to establish Television of Novi Sad as an independent entity. The Assembly of Autonomous Province of Vojvodina decided in 1972 to merge the radio with the new television as the Radio and Television of Novi Sad. Television broadcasts began on November 26, 1975. The initial broadcast was a special program, followed by news and political newscasts in Serbo-Croatian and Hungarian the next day. Initially, the TV station broadcast program in Slovak, Romanian, and Rusyn, later adding Romani and Ukrainian. The company was a part of the Yugoslav Radio Television, the national public broadcasting system in the SFR Yugoslavia.

=== FR Yugoslavia ===
In 1992 Radio Television Novi Sad, together with Radio Television Belgrade (RTB) and Radio Television Pristina (RTP), became a part of Radio Television of Serbia, with RTNS serving as the network affiliate for Vojvodina providing multilingual programming in addition to RTS' national programs.

In 1999, the RTNS studios in the Mišeluk neighborhood of Novi Sad were bombed and destroyed by the NATO airforce. After the war, the RTNS was moved to the new building in the city centre.

After the Overthrow of Slobodan Milošević in 2000, the new Broadcasting Act of 2002 of the Republic of Serbia for the first time explicitly established Radio Television of Serbia (formed on the basis of Radio Television Belgrade exclusively) and Radio Television of Vojvodina as distinct public broadcasters. Previously centralized RTS was constituted of Radio Television Belgrade, Radio Television of Prishtina and Radio Television of Novi Sad. In 2006, the previously centralized RTS was legally divided into two separate entities one of which was Radio Television of Vojvodina.

=== Since 2006 ===
In May 2006, the Radio Television of Serbia (Public Service of Serbia), based in Belgrade, ended its local services in Vojvodina, and with the reorganization of broadcasting services, Radio Television of Vojvodina (Public Service of Vojvodina), with headquarters in Novi Sad, was now formed on the basis of the old RTNS and part of the RTS bureaus for the region.

The 2014 Law on Public Broadcasting Service in Serbia regulates the operations of public broadcasters requiring that they nominally serve the public interest. In the same year, RTV held an open design competition for their new headquarters building at Mišeluk. The winning design was done by architects Dragoljub Kujović and Riste Dobrijević, while the interior was the work of Nikola Martinović of the N-MARTIN project.

Construction of the new headquarters building at Mišeluk started in 2018 and was completed in 2019, in which radio and administration moved in. Symbolically, the first radio signals emitted from the new building was done on the 70th anniversary of RTV on 25 November 2019. Television move into the new building in January 2021. Following the 2026 Serbian parliamentary election, on 26 October 2026, RTV opened its broadcast by apologising to viewers for years of unbalanced coverage.

== Languages ==
Radio Television of Vojvodina produces programmes in 7 languages: Serbian, Hungarian, Croatian, Slovak, Rusyn, Romanian and Romany.

Certain TV shows are also translated into Sign language. In addition, Serbian-subtitled versions of Deutsche Welle's English-language programmes are broadcast.

== Radio ==
RTV has the following radio channels:

- Radio Novi Sad 1 (Радио Нови Сад 1), in Serbian
- Radio Novi Sad 2 (Радио Нови Сад 2), in Hungarian
- Radio Novi Sad 3 (Радио Нови Сад 3), in Croatian, Slovak, Rusyn, Romanian and Romany
- Oradio (online radio station)

== Television ==
=== Current channels ===
- Rаdio television of Vojvodina 1 (Радио-телевизија Војводине 1), in Serbian.
- Radio television of Vojvodina 2 (Рaдио-телевизија Војводине 2), in Serbian and minority languages.

=== Former channels ===
==== 1999 to 2006 ====
Before the transformation of television into Radio Television of Vojvodina, the Radio Television Novi Sad had two channels:

- TV Novi Sad 1 (TВ Нoви Сад 1)
- TV Novi Sad 2 (ТВ Нови Сад 2)

==== Before 1999 ====
Before the NATO bombing, the Radio Television Novi Sad had two channels:

- TV Novi Sad (ТВ Нови Сад)
- TV Novi Sad plus (TВ Нови Сад плус)

== Programming ==
=== International ===
Original name	Local name	Origin
Tarzán	Тарзан; Tarzan	United States
The Brothers Karamazov	Браћа Карамазови; Braća Karamazovi	Russia
Les Jurés	Доба злочина Doba zločina	France
Frasier	Фрејжер; Frejžer	United States
Nothing Too Good for a Cowboy	Каубоју никад удовољити Kauboju nikad udovoljiti	Canada
Rachael Ray	Рејчел Реј; Rejčel Rej	United States
La tassinara	Таксисткиња; Taksistkinja	Italy

=== Domestic ===
- Čarde na Dunavu
- Kuhinjica
- Njuškanje

== Gallery ==
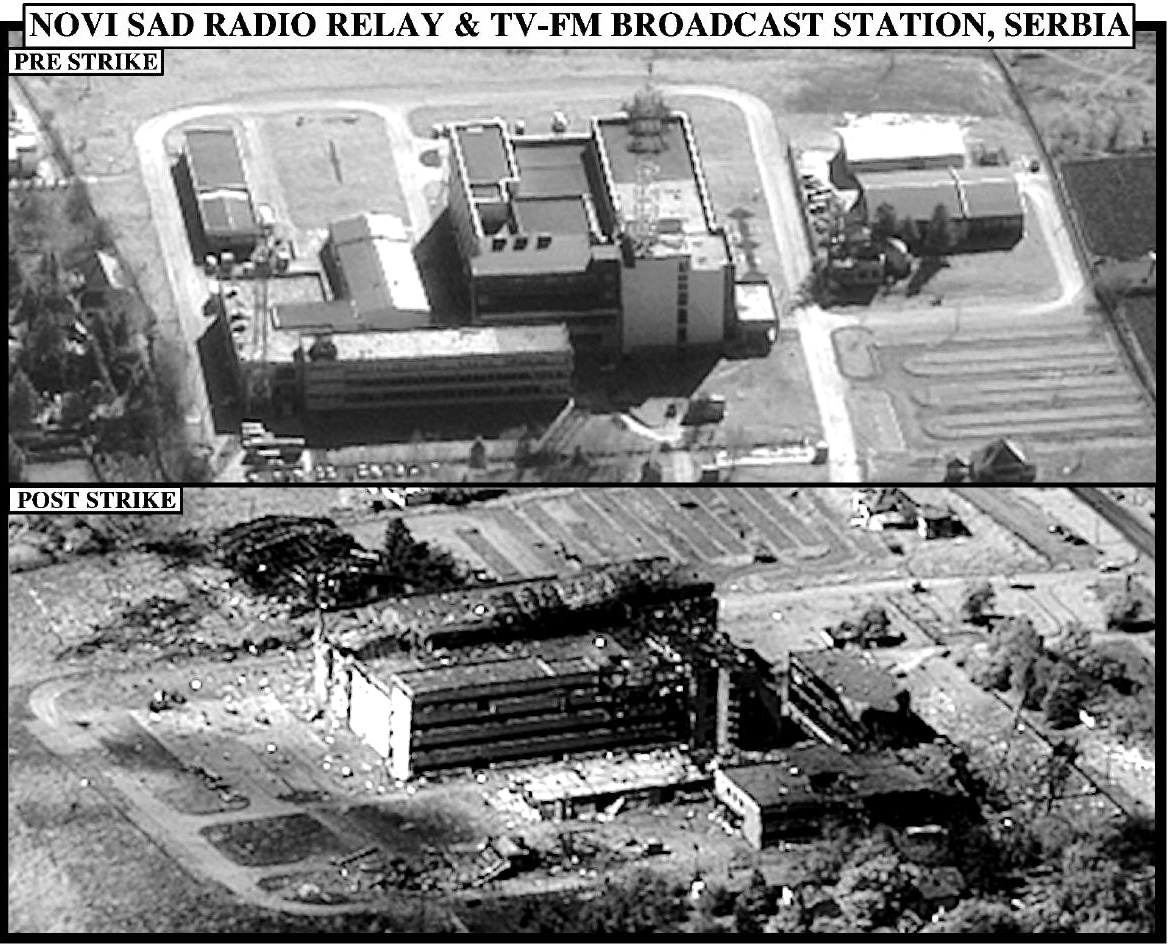
Old RTV headquarters at Mišeluk, before and after bombing, 1999

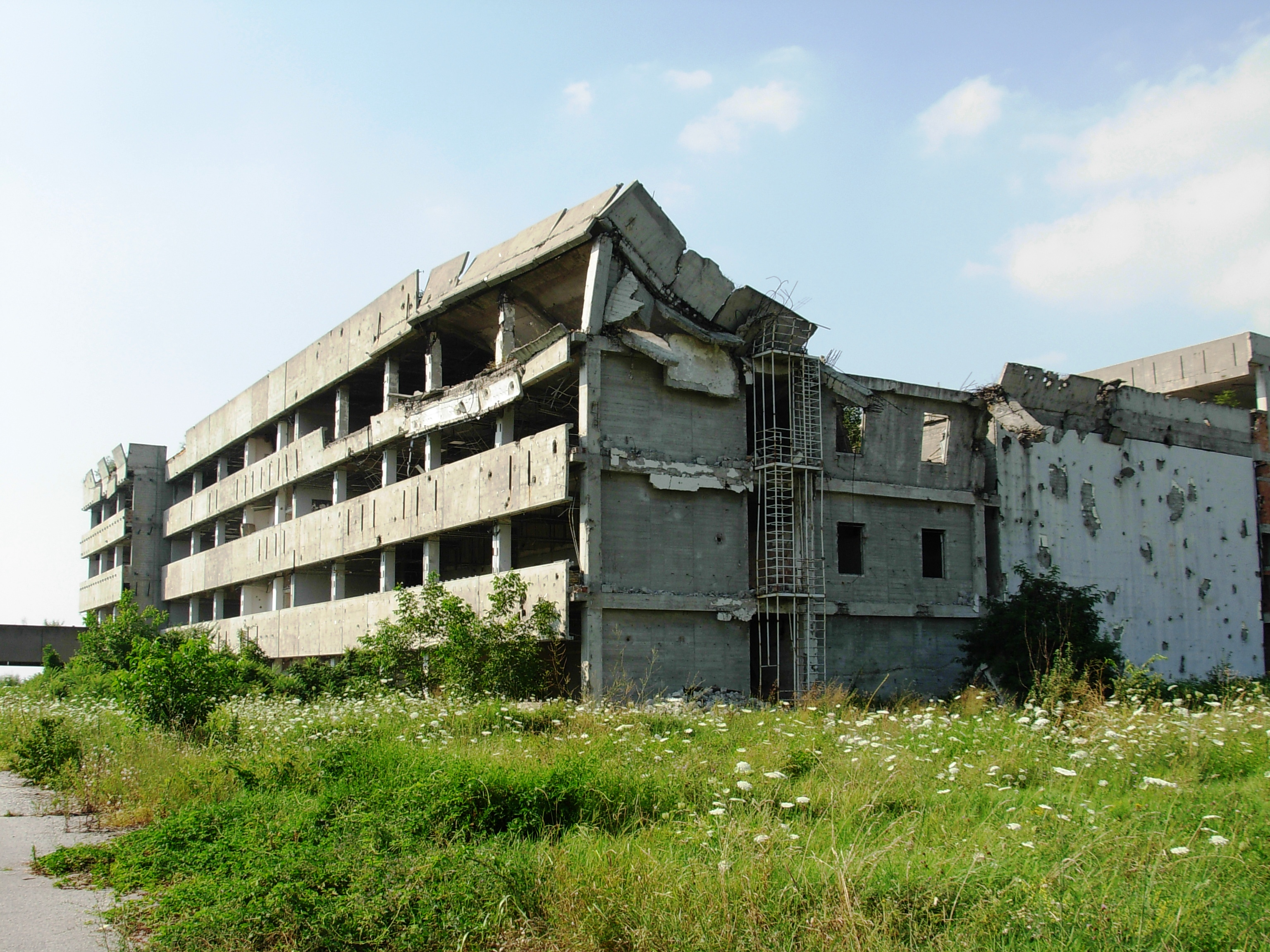
Ruins of the old RTV headquarters at Mišeluk, 2010

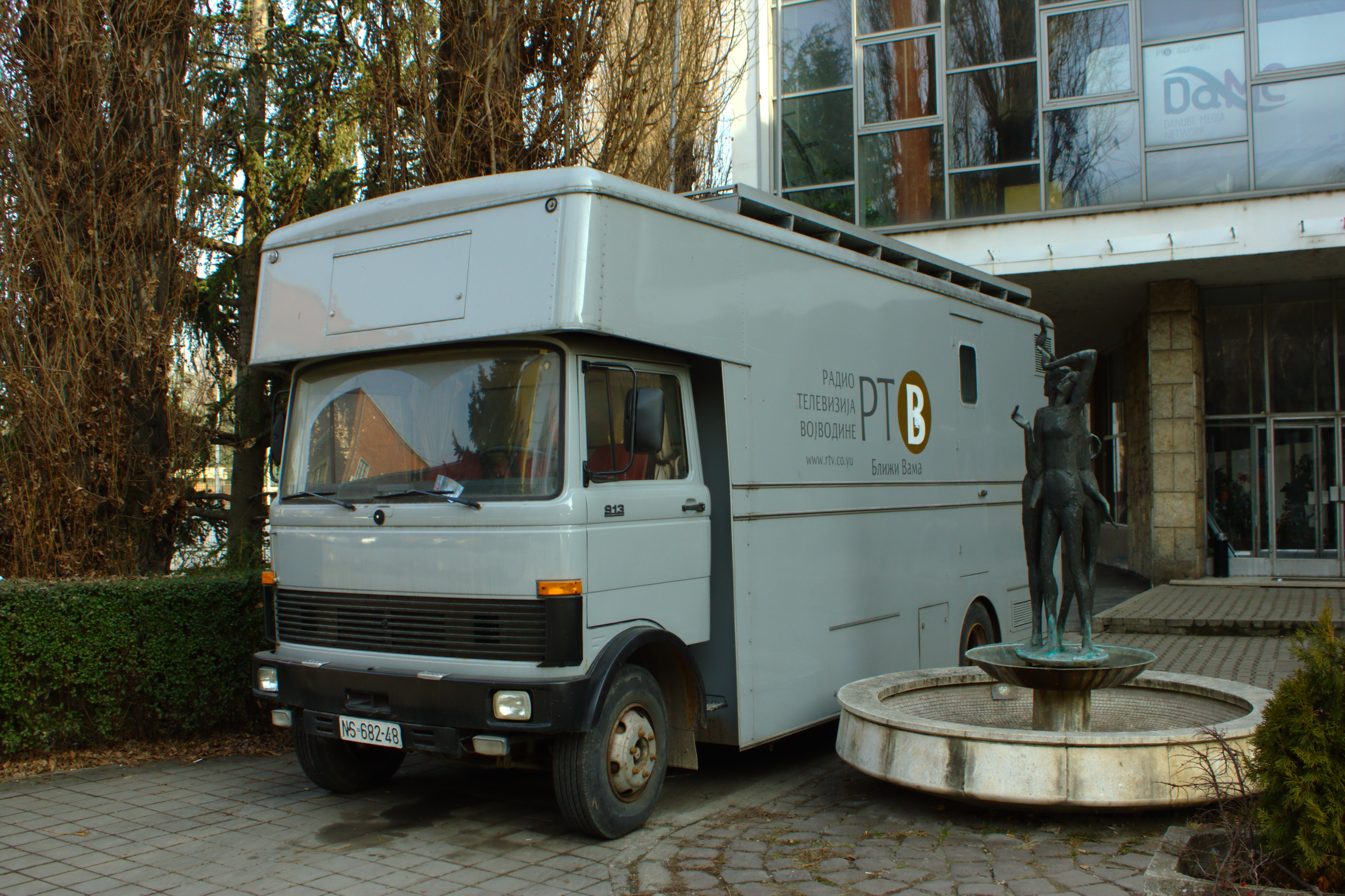
RTV television van, 2011

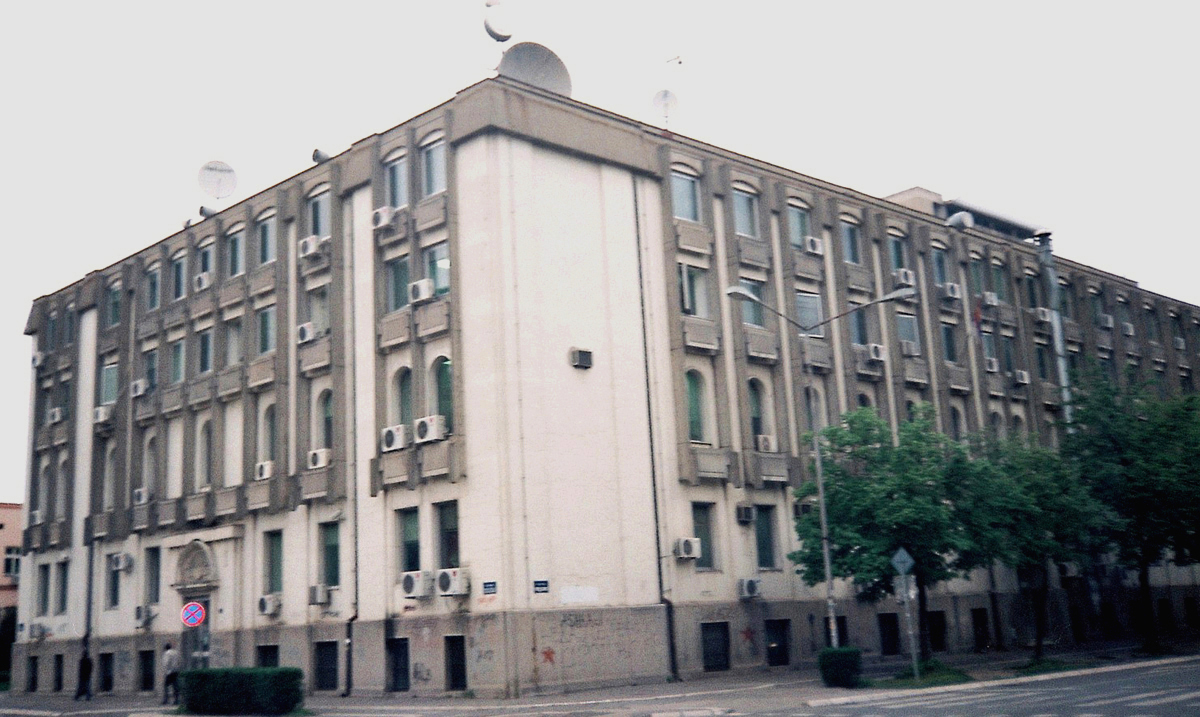
Temporary Television headquarters for RTV in Stari grad (1999–2021)

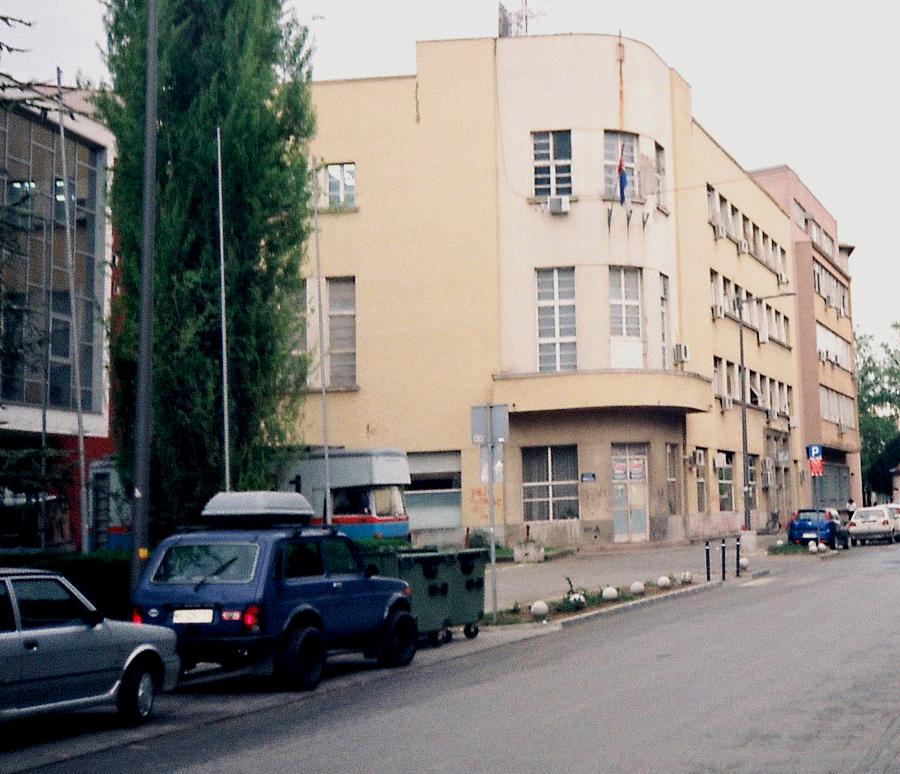
Temporary Radio headquarters for RTV in Stari grad (1999–2019)

== See also ==
- Radio Television of Serbia
- List of television stations in Serbia
