= S Vremena Na Vreme =

Serbian and Yugoslav rock band

- S Vremena Na Vreme in the 1990s, from left to right: Asim Sarvan, Vojislav Đukić, Ljubomir Ninković, Miomir Đukić

Background information
- Origin: Belgrade, Serbia
- Genres: Acoustic rock; folk rock; progressive rock
- Years active: 1972–1979; 1993–1997; 2013–2020
- Labels: Radio Kruševac, Jugoton, PGP-RTB, Studio B, ZKP RTLJ, PGP-RTS, ITMM, Komuna
- Past members: Miomir Đukić; Vojislav Đukić; Asim Sarvan; Ljubomir Ninković

S Vremena Na Vreme (Serbian Cyrillic: С Времена На Време, trans. From Time To Time) was a Serbian and Yugoslav rock band formed in Belgrade in 1972. S Vremena Na Vreme were one of the pioneers of the Yugoslav 1970s acoustic rock scene, and one of the pioneers in incorporating elements of the traditional music of the Balkans into rock music. They are considered one of the most prominent acts of the 1970s Yugoslav rock scene.

S Vremena Na Vreme was formed by brothers Miomir "Miki" Đukić and Vojislav "Koki" Đukić, Asim Sarvan and Ljubomir "Ljuba" Ninković, all four singing and playing acoustic guitars. The band gained popularity in the early 1970s with their acoustic rock sound, and their debut album, S Vremena Na Vreme (1975), was widely praised by the critics for compositions, poetic lyrics and music arrangements. Their second album, thr 1979 Paviljon G, marked the band's shift towards electric guitar-orineted sound. Soon after the album release, the band ended their activity. They reunited in 1993, releasing a studio, a live and a video album, before disbanding once again in 1997. In 2013, the band reunited for the second time to mark 40 years since their debut release, disbanding for the third and final time in 2020.

== History ==
=== Early career, nationwide success and breakup (1972–1979) ===
Prior to the formation of S Vremena Na Vreme, brothers Miomir "Miki" Đukić and Vojislav "Koki" Đukić performed in a high school band Pupoljci (The Buds) with flutist Bane Zarin, performing covers of international rock hits. At the time, Miomir Đukić wrote the ballad "Sunčana strana ulice" ("Sunny Side of the Street"), which achieved some local popularity. During Pupoljci's activity, Vojislav Đukić went to music school, where he took classical guitar lessons, composed music on the lyrics of poet Miljenko Žuborski and music for theatre plays.

At the same time, Asim Sarvan came to Belgrade from Mladenovac for his studies of world literature. There he met Ljubomir "Ljuba" Ninković. Ninković came to Belgrade from Smederevo, previously performing in the bands Maskirani Anđeli (The Masked Angels), Pet Sounds and The Spooks (in latter he played the organ). At the time he met Sarvan, Ninković performed as a singer-songwriter. He already gained prominence on the Yugoslav music scene, winning third place at the 1971 Youth Festival in Subotica for his performance of the song "Teuta, ljubavi moja" ("Teuta, My Love"), written by Tomor Beriša. He also had some success as an author, as his song "Slika" ("Picture") was recorded by Korni Grupa and released as a single in 1970. This song, with altered lyrics, would later be recorded by S Vremena Na Vreme under the title "Kao vreme ispred nas" ("Like the Time That's Coming").

The Đukić brothers, Sarvan and Ninković started working together in Radio Belgrade studios, recording humorous songs for the then-popular radio show Tip top kabare (Tip Top Cabaret). Soon they decided to form a band. After the suggestion of Boban Petrović, who worked as a recording technician in Radio Belgrade studios, they chose the name S Vremena Na Vreme (From Time to Time), as up to that point they gathered occasionally only. All four sang and played acoustic guitars, Miomir Đukić also playing prim.

Initially, the band mostly wrote music for theatre plays, including music for Lucrezia Borgia and The Mandrake performed in National Theatre in Belgrade, Beleške jedne Ane (Notes of an Anna) performed in the Đuro Salaj Theatre, and Nesumnjivo lice (An Unsuspicious Person) performed in Atelje 212. The band also recorded music for radio; the Radio Belgrade archive contains more than 100 recordings made by the band. During these recordings, the band introduced elements of the traditional music of the Balkans into rock music (being one of the first Yugoslav bands to do so), used traditional instruments and experimented with various musical genres and arrangements. Working mostly in studio, during the first period of their career the band rarely performed live. However, they did make notable appearances on the 1972 and 1973 concerts organized by Pop Mašina members in Belgrade's Košutnjak park, as well as on the 1974 BOOM Festival, the live version of their song "Odisej" ("Odysseus") appearing on the double live album BOOM Pop Festival Ljubljana '74. They also appeared on several pop music festivals. In both 1973 and 1974 they received the Best Original Music Award at the Festival of Yugoslav Radio held in Ohrid.

During the initial period of their career, the band cooperated with various musicians: Đukić brothers' former bandmate Bane Zarin, drummer Nikola Jager, drummer Ratislav Đelmaš (of YU Grupa), keyboardist Sloba Marković, bass guitarist Dejan Petković, flutist Dragoslav "Džib" Vokić, and contrabassist Nebojša Ignjatović. During Sarvan's and Miomir Đukić's temporary absence from the band due to their mandatory stints in the Yugoslav army, Ninković and Vojislav Đukić performed with female vocalists Tanja Bošković, Gorica Popović and Ljiljana Dragutinović, all of them drama students at the time and all three later gaining fame as actresses. During this period, the band members took part in the recording of the albums by Jadranka Stojaković, Vlada i Bajka, Srđan Marjanović and Tamara and Nenad Pavlović. On several occasions they recorded music for the songs composed by Kornelije Kovač and performed by pop music singers.

S Vremena Na Vreme released their first single, featuring the songs "Sunčana strana ulice" and "Ponekad" ("Sometimes"), in 1973. The track "Ponekad" featured the monologue spoken by the actor Marko Nikolić. The single was released by Radio Kruševac and got the atentnion of the audience and the media, so the band was offered a contract by the one of two biggest record labels in Yugoslavia, Zagreb-based Jugoton. For Jugoton the band released the single with the songs "Čudno drvo" ("Strange Tree") and "Odisej". After the success of the single, the band signed their new contract with the second of two biggest record labels, Belgrade-based PGP-RTB. At the time, the band started appearing in Television Belgrade show Tip top kabare, based on the Radio Belgrade show of the same title, for which the members of the band had already recorded, TV appearances bringing nationwide popularity to their songs "Čudno drvo", "Odisej", "Jana" and "Đački rastanak" ("Students' Farewell"), the latter composed on the lyrics of the poem by Serbian Romantic poet Branko Radičević.

In 1975, the band released their debut self-titled album. Most of the album lyrics were written in hotel Turist in Ljubljana on the last night of the album recording. The album featured Nikola Jager on drums—after the album recording he would become an unofficial member of the band—and Pop Mašina member Robert Nemeček on bass guitar. S Vremena Na Vreme brought hits "Tema Classica", originally composed by Ninković as a teenager, "Traži mene" ("Looking for Me"), "Utočište" ("Sanctuary") and "Biblijska tema" ("Biblical Theme"), the latter featuring verses from The Book of Psalms. The album, especially the poetic lyrics and the arrangements, the latter partially inspired by the works of The Beatles, was praised by the Yugoslav music press.

The band's following album, Moj svet (My World), released in 1978, was a compilation consisting of the songs from the band's 7-inch singles. During 1978 and 1979, in Belgrade Youth Center, the band held performances under the title Bistro kod plave sove (Blue Owl Bistro), accompanying the play Rastibuđilizovane klejbezable performed by amateur theatre Teatar Levo. In March 1979, S Vremena Na Vreme held a successful tour across Poland, on which they performed together with several amateur theatres from Belgrade. During the same year, the band, with the progressive rock band Tako, organized the first quadraphonic sound concert in Yugoslavia, in Belgrade Youth Center.

In 1979, the band released their second studio album Paviljon G (Pavilion G), which marked the band's shift towards electric sound, although the album's biggest hit, "Petak je popodne... baby" ("It's Friday Afternoon... Baby"), resembled their acoustic works. The album featured the cynical song "Rok kritičar" ("Rock Critic"), inspired by praises for the expanding punk rock scene coming from Yugoslav music journalists. After the album was released, Vojislav Đukić went to serve his mandatory army stint, and the band members decided to disband, partially due to new musical trends on the Yugoslav scene and the great popularity of new wave bands.

=== Post-breakup (1980–1992) ===
After the band ended their activity, Sarvan formed the band Muzej Sarvan (Museum Sarvan, releasing only one 7-inch single with the band) and wrote songs for folk music singers, and, in 1984, released the solo album entitled Asime, spasi me (Asim, Save Me), which he recorded with Baklava Band and keyboardist Laza Ristovski. The album was produced by Ninković, who wrote most of the album songs, the album also featuring a cover of the traditional song "Kaleš bre Anđo". Ljuba Ninković started working in Radio Belgrade, and with Vlada Janković "Džet" (a former Crni Biseri member) he formed the band Tunel, with which he recorded five albums. In 1985, Ninković took part in YU Rock Misija, a Yugoslav contribution to Live Aid. Vojislav Đukić wrote music for theatre plays, most notably Kapetan Džon Piplfoks (Captain John Peoplefox) performed in Radović theatre. He promoted a number of young bands on the concerts he organized in Dadov Theatre together with Robert Nemeček. Nikola Jager joined the band Exit, recording the album Exit (1988) with them.

In 1983, S Vremena Na Vreme made a brief reunion to appear in Srđan Karanović's film Something in Between. In the film, the band members portrayed a kafana band which performs a combination of country and Serbian folk music. The music they recorded for the film was composed by Zoran Simjanović and was released on Simjanović's 2006 box set Pesme iz filmova (Songs from the Movies).

In 1990, Ninković and Sarvan re-recorded some of the band's most popular songs and released them as Ljuba & Asim on the album Najveći hitovi grupe S Vremena Na Vreme (The Greatest Hits of the band S Vremena Na Vreme). At the beginning of the 1990s, Ninković, together with actor Milorad Mandić, worked on Radio Television of Belgrade children's show S one strane duge (Over the Rainbow). The two of them, together with a number of musicians, recorded the children's music album S one strane duge.

=== Reunion and second breakup (1993–1997) ===
On Sarvan's idea, in May 1993 in Belgrade Youth Center, the most prominent musicians of Serbian 1960s and 1970s acoustic rock scene gathered to perform on a fund-raising concert. The good reception of the performance convinced S Vremena Na Vreme members to reunite. They held their comeback concert in Sava Centar on 5 November 1993, featuring keyboardist Saša Lokner (of Bajaga i Instruktori), bass guitarist Bata Božanić, drummer Ratko Ljubičić and percussionist Nenad Januzović performing with the band. The concert also featured guest appearance by singer Snežana Jandrlić, who performed the song "Prvi sneg" ("First Snow"), originally recorded by her former band Suncokret. The recording of the concert was released on the video album S Vremena Na Vreme uživo, Sava Centar novembar 1993 (S Vremena Na Vreme Live, Sava Centar November 1993). At the same time, the band released the compilation album Vreme ispred nas (The Time That's Coming) which featured, alongside their old songs, a live version of "Sunčana strana ulice", and "Na početku i na kraju" ("In the Beginning and in the End"), the latter originally recorded in December 1973 but previously unreleased. In 1994, the song "Sunčana strana ulice" was released on Komuna compilation album Sve smo mogli mi: Akustičarska muzika (We Could Have Done All: Acoustic Music), which featured songs by Yugoslav acoustic rock acts. Director Milutin Petrović and journalist Petar Janjatović made a documentary film Večna grupa S Vremena Na Vreme (Eternal Band S Vremena Na Vreme), dealing with the band's reunion.

In 1995, S Vremena Na Vreme released the studio album Posle kraja (After the End). The album featured Bata Božanić (on bass guitar), Saša Lokner (on keyboards), Čeda Macura (on drums), Pera "Joe" Miladinović (on harmonica), and Marija Mihajlović (on vocals in the song "Spavaj"). Alongside new songs, the album featured a new version of their 1974 song "Povratna karta" ("Return Ticket"). During the same year, Ninković and Marija Mihajlović recorded the album Zvuk tišine (The Sound of Silence), which featured their versions of songs by Pink Floyd, Simon & Garfunkel, The Rolling Stones, The Beatles and other artists. The recording of the concert that S Vremena Na Vreme held at Studio M in Novi Sad on 30 January 1996, which was a part of the NS Plus Unplugged series, was released on the live album Unplugged in the summer of 1997. Alongside their songs, the album also featured a cover of Bob Dylan's song "Knockin' on Heaven's Door". After the album was released, the band disbanded once again.

=== Post breakup (1997–2013) ===
Ninković took part in the 1996–1997 protests against the regime of Slobodan Milošević. In 1999, One Records reissued the band's debut album with previously unreleased songs "Tema za violinu" ("Theme for Violin"), "Kad nestanem" ("When I'm Gone") and "Sumnja" ("Doubt") as bonus tracks. During 1999, Ninković and the Đukić brothers, with the actor Goran Sultanović, performed a cabaret show entitled Ja pevam svoj bluz (I'm Singing My Blues). The performances were based on the poetry of Vladislav Petković Dis, Milan Rakić, Matija Bećković, Bora Đorđević, Đorđe Balašević and others. In early 2000s, Ninković joined the ethnic music group Bistrik Orchestra, led by singer Bilja Krstić, producing the group's 2000 debut album Bistrik. He wrote music for a number of plays, several TV shows and for the 2002 documentary film Beloglavi sup – čovekov prijatelj (Griffon Vulture – Man's Friend). He formed the ethnic music group Zlatopis (the name being a wordplay which could be translated as Golden Inscription), recording the album Zlatopis (2013) with them. In 2017, he released his first solo album, Hodač (Walker), and in 2020, he released the album Retromet (Retroworks). Simultaneously, he released two albums of ambient instrumentals, Tamni tonovi (Dark Tones, 2017) and Maslinka (Olive, 2021).

In 2003, Sarvan released the ethnic music album U potrazi za dobrim odgovorom (Searching for a Good Answer). The album featured songs recorded during the 1990s for Radio Television of Serbia show Radionica zvuka (Workshop of Sound). In 2007, he recorded the ethnic music album Ajde Jano kuću da ne damo (Come On, Jano, Let's Not Give Our House, the title being an altered verse from the traditional song "'Ajde Jano") with a group of young musicians.

The band's long-time unofficial member Nikola Jager died in 2008.

In 2011, Ninković and the Đukić brothers reunited under the name Svremenaši (From-timers). The band performed on the 2011 Belgrade Beer Fest, and on 12 November, together with Croatian and Yugoslav progressive rock band Drugi Način, held a concert in Belgrade Youth Center.

=== Second reunion (2013–2020) ===
In 2013, Ninković, Sarvan and the Đukić brothers reunited to celebrate 40 years since the release of their debut single, "Sunčana strana ulice", with a concert in Ilija M. Kolarac Endowment in Belgrade. The concert was held on 16 May, and featured guest appearances by Drago Mlinarec, Dušan Mihajlović "Spira" and Dragan Popović. After the concert, the band continued to perform live, their concert activity ending with the outbreak of COVID-19 pandemic in Serbia.

In 2020, Vojislav Đukić published the book of the band's lyrics.

=== Post breakup (2020–present) ===
In 2022, Sarvan released the double album 60s u mom Gradu / Kamen po kamen (60s in My City / Stone by Stone), representing his critique of modern popular music.

Ljubomir Ninković died on 6 January 2026, aged 76.

== Legacy ==
In 1989, the song "Traži mene" was covered by Yugoslav singer-songwriter and former Azra leader Branimir "Johnny" Štulić on his album Balkanska rapsodija (Balkan Rhapsody). In 2011, Štulić released a cover of "Sunčana strana ulice" on his official YouTube channel. In 2012, the song "Čudno drvo" was remixed in by the Serbian project Laura 2000.

The album S Vremena Na Vreme was polled in 1998 as 30th on the list of 100 greatest Yugoslav popular music albums in the book YU 100: najbolji albumi jugoslovenske rok i pop muzike (YU 100: The Best albums of Yugoslav pop and rock music).

In 2011, the song "Moj svet" was polled, by the listeners of Radio 202, one of 60 greatest songs released by PGP-RTB/PGP-RTS during the sixty years of the label's existence.

The lyrics of 9 songs by the band were featured in Petar Janjatović's book Pesme bratstva, detinjstva & potomstva: Antologija ex YU rok poezije 1967 - 2007 (Songs of Brotherhood, Childhood & Offspring: Anthology of Ex YU Rock Poetry 1967 – 2007).

== Discography ==
=== Studio albums ===
- S Vremena Na Vreme (1975)
- Paviljon G (1979)
- Posle kraja (1995)

=== Live albums ===
- Unplugged (1997)

=== Compilation albums ===
- Moj svet (1978)
- Vreme ispred nas (1993)

=== Singles ===
- "Sunčana strana ulice" / "Ponekad" (1973)
- "Čudno drvo" / "Odisej" (1973)
- "Povratna karta" / "Đački rastanak" (1974)
- "Jana" / "Tavna noć" (1974)
- "Kao vreme ispred nas" / "Kad budem stariji" (1974)
- "Dixie band" / "Tema za šargiju" (1975)
- "Put putuje karavan" / "Priča sa istočne strane" (1977)
- "Moj svet" / "Saveti dobroj kuci" (1977)
- "Učinila je pravu stvar" / "Spavaj" (1978)

=== Video albums ===
- S Vremena Na Vreme uživo, Sava Centar novembar 1993 (1993)
