= Karizma (Serbian band) =

Serbian hard rock band

- Origin: Belgrade, Serbia
- Genres: Hard rock; glam metal
- Years active: 1985–1994; 2005–present
- Labels: PGP-RTB, One Records, PGP-RTS
- Members: Dušan Janićijević; Dragoljub Popović; Dejan Jelisavčić; Dragan Živković; Saša Đokić; Nenad Đorđević
- Past members: Dejan Lukić; Dušan Zarić; Dejan Tomović; Zoran Miletić; Goran Tadić; Nemanja Petrović

Karizma (Serbian Cyrillic: Каризма; trans. Charisma) is a Serbian and Yugoslav hard rock band formed in Belgrade in 1985.

== Band history ==
=== 1985–1994 ===
Karizma was formed in Belgrade in 1985 by Dušan "Duca" Janićijević (guitar), Dragoljub "Đoki" Popović (guitar), Dejan Lukić "Francuz" (bass guitar), and Goran "Edi" Tadić (drums), who were later joined by Dušan Zarić (vocals) and Dejan Tomović (keyboards). The band was named after the song "Charisma" by Kiss. They were musically inspired by Kiss, Bon Jovi, Iron Maiden and Def Leppard. In 1988, Karizma won the first place at Gitarijada festival in Zaječar. During the same year, they released their debut album Vreme je za nas (It's Time for Us) through PGP-RTB. At the time of the album release, Lukić and Tadić had been replaced by Zoran Miletić and Srđan Milenković respectively. The track "Vrati se" ("Come Back") became a minor hit for the band. After the album was released, Zarić left the band due to his mandatory stint in the Yugoslav army, and a former Otkrovenje (Revelation) vocalist Dejan "Jelfan" Jelisavčić replaced Zarić. The band toured Serbia extensively, performing as the opening band on Kerber tour, also having a tour across Bulgaria.

In 1991, the band released their second studio album, U snovima (In the Dreams), with Goran "Edi" Tadić on drums, who had in the meantime returned to the band and replaced Milenković. Tadić also designed the cover for the album. The album was produced by Vlada Barjaktarević and featured a cover of Oliver Mandić's song "Ljuljaj me nežno". In 1993, bass guitarist Saša Đokić and drummer Dragan Živković "Pizzi" (formerly of Bride) replaced Tomović and Tadić. In 1994, the band recorded demos for the album that was never released and disbanded soon after. During the same year, the band's song "Daj mi" ("Let Me") was released on Komuna compilation album Pakleni vozači: Jugoslovenski hard rock (Hell Riders: Yugoslav Hard Rock).

=== Post breakup ===
After the band ended their activity, Jelisavčić moved to London, and upon returning to Serbia sang in the group Afrodizijak (Aphrodisiac), releasing an eponymous album with them, and later started his own studio. Saša Đokić performed with pop singer Maja Nikolić, guitarist Zlatko Manojlović and the bands Frenky and Straight Jackin'. Tomović was a member of Vampiri.

=== 2005–present ===
In 2005, Karizma reunited in the lineup featuring Dejan Jelisavčić (vocals), Dušan Janićijević (guitar), Saša Đokić (bass guitar) and Dragan Živković (drums), as well as new members Duško Maslac (guitar, formerly of Jugosloveni and Mladen Vojičić "Tifa"'s backing band) and Nemanja Petrović (keyboards). During the same year, the band released the compilation album Retro-active, which consisted of the remastered songs from U snovima, the song "Ludnica" ("Madhouse"), recorded in 1994, and the new version of "Vrati se". In 2006, a former Ruski Rulet (Russian Roulette) and Alisa keyboardist Nenad "Žvaka" Đorđević replaced Petrović, and one of the original Karizma members, Dragoljub Popović, returned to the band. In June 2014, the band released a remixed version of "Vrati se" from their debut album as a single.

At the end of 2016, Karizma released their third studio album, entitled Smej se (Laugh), through PGP-RTS. The album was produced by Jelisavčić. The album cover was designed by the band's former member Goran Tadić. It featured 12 songs, including a cover of Hardline song "Takin' Me Down" entitled "Ritam mi daj" ("Give Me Rhythm"). In 2020, with the song "Ona me zna" ("She Knows Me") the band took part in the Beovizija 2020 festival, the national selection for Serbia's representative at the Eurovision Song Contest, entering the semi-finals.

== Discography ==
=== Studio albums ===
- Vreme je za nas (1988)
- U snovima (1991)
- Smej se (2016)

=== Compilations ===
- Retro-active (2005)
