= Doktor Spira i Ljudska Bića =

- Doktor Spira i Ljudska Bića performing live in 2007

Background information
- Origin: Belgrade, SR Serbia, SFR Yugoslavia
- Genres: New wave; post-punk; alternative rock; art rock; experimental music; minimal music
- Years active: 1979–1987; 2007 - present
- Labels: PGP-RTB, Multimedia Records, Doktor Spira
- Members: Dušan Mihajlović; Kosta Paunović; Luka Malko; Nikola Radojčić; Jevrem Ćosić
- Past members: Dušan Mihajlović; Zoran Dašić; Stevan Milinković; Želimir Vasić; Enco Lesić; Zoran Radomirović – Švaba; Dragan - Gagi Mihajlović; Dušan Dejanović; Dragan Đerić; Vladimir Negovanović; Jane Parđovski; Predrag – Lazar Marković; Miroslav Šen; Predrag Milanović; Ivan Vdović; Milica Jakovljević; Milan Dragović; Predrag Kozomara; Aleksandar Miletić; Slobodan Jurišić; Ana Milanović; Sanja Bogosavljević; Emily Jane; Branko Kuštrin; Kosta Paunović; Luka Malko; Nikola Radojčić; Jevrem Ćosić

Doktor Spira i Ljudska Bića (Serbian Cyrillic: Доктор Спира и Људска Бића; trans. Doctor Spira and the Human Beings) were a Serbian new wave/alternative rock band from Belgrade. They were a prominent act of the Yugoslav new wave scene.

Formed in the late 1970s by Dušan Mihajlović "Spira" (acoustic guitar, vocals), who had already gained prominence on the Yugoslav acoustic rock scene, Doktor Spira i Ljudska Bića were a part of the Yugoslav new wave scene. Despite Spira's cult status on the Belgrade scene, Dijagnoza was refused by major Yugoslav record labels, so Mihajlović self-released the album in 1981. The band's debut album was reissued by PGP-RTB, and in 1987 with an extended line-up and a number of guests they recorded the double album "Dizajn za stvarni svet" ("Design for the real world"), which remained unreleased until 2007. The band stopped performing in near the end of 1987 and Spira moved to London, Unioted Kingdom. In 2007, the band's debut and previously unreleased second studio album were released together on the CD compilation album Arheološki artefakti tehnofilskih civilizacija prošlosti ili naučna fantastika kao žanr u umetničkim delima s kraja dvadesetog veka, and Doktor Spira i Ljudska Bića in the new line-up performed in Pozorište na Terazijama. In November 2023 with a new line-up consisting of the youngest generation of Beograd's jazz musicians Spira triumphantly returned to performing with a concert in Beograd's Zappa Baza to promote vinyl re-release of "Dijagnoza" and final release on vinyl of "Dizajn za stvarni svet". In May 2024 the bend returned to Zappa Baza for another high-energy concert.

== History ==
=== Spira's early career, band formation (1972–1979) ===
The singer-songwriter Dušan Mihajlović "Spira" started his musical career during the late 1972 in an acoustic rock duo called Mira i Spira (Mira and Spira), featuring Spira on guitar and vocals and Mirjana "Mira" Marković on vocals. After a series of performances on Belgrade happenings and concerts, especially the ones organized by Pop Mašina members in the Belgrade Sports Hall, Mihajlović achieved a major affirmation after the inclusion of his song "Prvi sneg" ("The First Snow") into the repertoire of the acoustic rock band Suncokret, being eventually released on their debut album Moje bube (My Bugs) in 1977.

During the late 1970s, Mihajlović had given up the acoustic sound, turning towards the current trends of the time, the upcoming new wave music, forming the band Doktor Spira i Ljudska Bića, which in its initial period had changed numerous lineups.

=== Recording "Dijagnoza" ===
In 1980, the lineup consisting of Mihajlović (vocals, acoustic guitar), Zoran Dašić (guitar), Stevan Milinković (bass guitar) and Želimir Vasić (drums) recorded the debut album Dijagnoza (Diagnosis). The album, produced by Mihajlović himself, featured the unusual and original songs "Buđenje" ("The Awakening"), "Ima dana kada mene moja duša boli" ("There Are Days When My Soul is Aching"), "Dr. Paranoja" ("Dr. Paranoia"), "Uvek isto zbogom" ("Always the Same Farewell"), and "Igrač na žici" ("Tightrope Dancer"), bearing a strong narrative notion of alienation. Recorded at the Enco Lesić's Druga maca studio in Belgrade and mastered at the Trident studio in London, the album featured guest appearance by Enco Lesić on electric piano. All music and Lyrics were written by Spira except "Psychoneurosis" for which Dragan Popović DAG wrote music and Spira lyrics

At the time, Mihajlović enjoyed a cult status among the audience, however, this did not affect the major Yugoslav record labels to release the album. Since he could not find a publisher among Yugoslav labels, during 1981, Mihajlović went to London and financed himself the printing of 50 copies of the album, which he brought to Belgrade and distributed to his friends. The LP had a white paper cover without any images and the track listing was written by hand. The album promotion of the exclusive album release was held in December 1981 at the Atelje 212 theatre. The band continued performing the material, enjoying cult status among audience and musicians alike—in 1982, Momčilo Bajagić, at the time Riblja Čorba guitarist, later the leader of Bajaga i Instruktori, named Dijagnoza one of his ten most favourite albums—until 1985, when they disbanded.

=== Commercial release of "Dijagnoza" ===
In 1986, the pop rock musician Oliver Mandić became an editor for the PGP-RTB record label. In a discussion at a local bistro with Bora Đorđević, frontman o the hard rock band Riblja Čorba, Mandić claimed that he, as the new editor, would bring changes to PGP-RTB. Đorđević, annoyed with Mandić's statements, made a bet with him to release Dijagnoza. Without any promotion, the album was released in a minimal printing of 2,000 copies, and quickly sold out. At the time Mihajlović designed and built a mini guitar amplifier called "Gvozdeno Pile" (Iron Chicken") and mini amplifier for bass called "Drveno Pile" amp. The amplifiers were used in a number of commercial studios in Beograd and Kornelije Kovač named one of the tracks on his album "Gvozdeno pile" after the little amplifier.

=== Recording of "Dizajn za stvarni svet" ===
In 1987, Mihajlović recorded the second studio album, Dizajn za stvarni svet (A Real World Design), featuring diverse musical influences which could stylistically be called world music, even though the expression was not used at the time, combined with krautrock, gothic rock, dance music, boogie, jazz and atonal music. Following the musical and production trends of the time, Mihajlović retained the same lyrical style on the new material as on Dijagnoza. The album would, however, remain unreleased until 2007. In 1988, he had moved to London and dedicated himself to business with computers.

=== Slight return (2007) ===
In 2006, Mihajlović started remastering the album Dijagnoza and the album Dizajn za stvarni svet, which were rereleased on CD by Multimedia Records in 2007 on the deluxe compilation album Arheološki artefakti tehnofilskih civilizacija prošlosti ili naučna fantastika kao žanr u umetničkim delima s kraja dvadesetog veka (The Archeological Artifacts of the Past Technophilic Civilizations or Science Fiction as a Genre in the Late Twentieth Century Artistic Works).

During October of the same year, Mihajlović made several live appearances in Belgrade with Doktor Spira i Ljudska Bića in a new lineup which, beside him, featured the former member Predrag Milanović (bass guitar), Predrag Kozomara (guitars), Aleksandar Miletić (keyboards), Slobodan Jurišić (drums), Ana Milanović (backing vocals) and Sanja Bogosavljević (backing vocals). Special guest appearances included Emily Jane Šarić (vocals) and Dragan Popović's Mitropa Music Project from Sweden.

=== Vinyl Re-release of "Dijagnoza" ===
- Album re-mastered and re/cut in Abbey Road.

=== Vinyl release of "Dizajn za stvarni svet" ===
- Album re-mastered and re/cut in Abbey Road.

=== Return to performing ===
- 9th November 2023 - Zappa Baza, Beograd
- 9th May 2024 - Zappa Baza, Beograd

== Legacy ==
The song "Ima dana kada mene moja duša boli" was covered by singer Bilja Krstić on her solo album Iz unutrašnjeg džepa, released by PGP-RTB in 1985. The garage rock band Kazna Za Uši on one of their first recordings paid a tribute to the band with the lines "Devojčice tvoja majka stvarno nije imala sreće..." ("Little girl, your mother really didn't have much luck..."), taken from the song "U znaku lava" from "Dijagnoza".

The lyrics of 4 songs by the band were featured in Petar Janjatović's book Pesme bratstva, detinjstva & potomstva: Antologija ex YU rok poezije 1967 - 2007 (Songs of Brotherhood, Childhood & Offspring: Anthology of Ex YU Rock Poetry 1967–2007).

== Discography ==
=== Studio albums ===
- Dijagnoza (1981, 1996, 2023)
- Dizajn za stvarni svet (1987, 2023)

=== Compilation albums ===
- Arheološki artefakti tehnofilskih civilizacija prošlosti ili naučna fantastika kao žanr u umetničkim delima s kraja dvadesetog veka (2007)

== See also ==
- New wave music in Yugoslavia
