= Oliver Mandić =

- Born: 13 July 1953 (age 72); Titovo Užice, PR Serbia, FPR Yugoslavia
- Origin: Belgrade, Serbia
- Genres: rock music, jazz rock, synthpop, pop rock, yu rock, disco, funk, folk rock, children's music, New Romanticism, new wave
- Occupations: Singer, songwriter, record producer
- Instruments: Vocals, keyboards, piano
- Years active: 1970–present
- Labels: PGP-RTB, Jugoton, PGP-RTS, City Records, Komuna

Oliver Mandić (Serbian Cyrillic: Оливер Мандић; born 13 July 1953) is a Serbian and former Yugoslav rock musician, composer, and producer.

== Early life ==
Musically involved from a young age, Mandić first started playing the accordion before taking up the piano. In his early youth, Mandić's family moved to the capital Belgrade where he pursued a career as a pianist after getting accepted at highly reputable Kornelije Stanković musical high school. However, despite a lot of promise, he left school in 1969 to try to branch out into pop music.

== Early career ==
During the early 1970s, Mandić performed in various Belgrade bands as the keyboardist, and was described as "the wunderkind of Belgrade [rock] scene".

Towards the end of 1971, he formed the jazz-rock band Oliver, which consisted of Mandić, members of the progressive rock band Pop Mašina and singer Dušan Prelević. Functioning as a supergroup of sorts, the band had only one live appearance, on 2 January 1972, at a concert in Belgrade's Hala sportova.

After Oliver disbanded, Mandić joined Pop Mašina, performing with them on only several occasions, before entering talks to join YU grupa and Time, neither of which materialized.

In 1974, with Prelević, he recorded the 7-inch single "Tajna" / "Prošlo je sve" ("Secret" / "Everything's Over"), which was released under the Oliver moniker.

In 1976, Mandić performed at the BOOM Festival as member of Beogradska Rock Selekcija, an ad-hoc band assembled specifically for the occasion, featuring Robert Nemeček (bass guitar), Zoran Božinović (guitar), Lazar Tošić (drums), Stjepko Gut (trumpet), Jovan Maljoković (saxophone), Ivan Švager (saxophone), and others. That gig brought Mandić his first eccentric episode in public, something he would become known for later on, as he smashed his synthesizer on stage and walked out in the middle of the performance unhappy with the level of commitment his fellow musicians were putting forth.

== Solo career ==
Mandić started his solo career in 1978 with the single "Ljuljaj me nežno" ("Rock Me Gently"). He composed the song, with Marina Tucaković's lyrics, for the singer Slađana Milošević, since the song was composed after her major hit song "Sexy dama", 1978. as a continuation of her musical style. Slađana Milošević was the one who persuaded her school mate Oliver to start his singing career and sing "Ljuljaj me nežno" by himself. Oliver publicly thanked her for that in several interviews and occasions. Milošević herself did not want to continue down that avenue and after her refusal the song was offered to a singer Maja Odžaklievska, however, since she failed to show up in Split studio Tetrapak for a booked recording session, Mandić agreed to accept another suggestion made by producer Enco Lesić to record it himself. The material was released the same year as a two-side single "Ljuljaj me nežno" / "Šuma" by PGP-RTB, garnering positive reactions both commercially and critically. A year later, Mandić recorded another successful single, featuring the songs "Sutra imam prazan stan" ("Tomorrow I'll Have an Empty Flat") and the ballad "Osloni se na mene" ("Lean on Me").

Zdravko Čolić came calling next, inviting Mandić as guest on his country-wide tour that included stadiums and sports arenas. Mandić's part in the show consisted of coming out in the middle of Čolić's performance and doing only "Ljuljaj me nežno", which had by that time become a sizable hit.

In 1979 he wrote and recorded a track "Cvećke i zloće", which was included in Goran Marković's movie Nacionalna klasa.

=== Nationwide popularity ===
In 1981, Mandić released his debut album, entitled Probaj me (Try Me), produced by Peter MacTaggart. All the songs were composed by Mandić, and the lyrics were written by Marina Tucaković. The album brought hits "Nije za nju" ("Not for Her"), "Samo nebo zna (Poludeću)" ("Sky Only Knows (I'll Go Crazy)") and rerecorded "Osloni se na mene". The album was promoted with a TV show Beograd noću (Belgrade at Night), directed by Stanko Crnobrnja. The ambitiously avantgarde programme even won Rose d'Or award at the 1981 Montreux TV festival. Mandić's controversial androgynous image in the show, was conceived by his school mate and good friend Slađana Milošević who, after many days and nights spent in endless persuasions and discussions, finally put Oliver in touch with conceptual artist Kosta Bunuševac who, she thought, would create the outwardly image for Oliver. This had raised quite a public furor due to the singer's cross-dressing and aggressive makeup. His androgynous image, which the Yugoslav audience found especially shocking in the early 1980s, attracted considerable media attention.

In 1982, Mandić released his second studio album, Zbog tebe bih tucao kamen (I Would Break Rocks for You). The album was recorded in Switzerland and produced by Mandić and MacTaggart. It featured Nenad "Japanac" Stefanović on bass guitar, Điđi Jankelić on drums, Aleksandar Milovanović on guitar, Laza Ristovski on keyboards, Mića Marković on saxophone, Stjepko Gut on trumpet, and Bebi Dol on backing vocals, and the cover art was designed by Mirko Ilić. The album brought hits "Smejem se, a plakao bih" ("I'm Laughing, but I Feel Like Crying"), "Neverne Bebe" ("Unfaithful Babies") and "Sve su seke jebene" ("All the fucking girls", with lyrics written after the motifs from Serbian erotic folk poetry collected by Vuk Stefanović Karadžić).

In 1984, Mandić appeared at the MESAM festival for the first time, performing the folk-inspired song "Pitaju me, pitaju" ("They're Asking Me, They're Asking"), for which the lyrics were written by Marina Tucaković. The same year Mandić produced Dʼ Boys album Muvanje (Hitting On).

In 1985, he released the album Dođe mi da vrisnem tvoje ime (I Feel like Screaming Your Name), which brought folk-inspired hits "Pomagajte drugovi" ("Help Me, My Friends"), with which he won the first place at the 1985 MESAM festival, and "Bobane" ("Oh, Boban..."). During the same year, Mandić took part in YU Rock Misija, Yugoslav contribution to Live Aid.

=== Semi-retirement ===
After playing a show with Laza Ristovski at Sava Centar in 1985, Mandić began keeping a noticeably lower profile on the pop scene. He got an executive job at the PGP-RTB record label, where he stayed for most of 1986 and 1987, before releasing a greatest hits compilation Sve najbolje (All the Best) that marked the 10th anniversary of his solo career. The same year, 1987, saw Mandić team up with Nikša Bratoš to produce Boris Novković's second album Jači od sudbine, which sold very well. Mandić also received an offer to produce Plavi Orkestar's second album Smrt fašizmu, but turned it down.

For the remainder of the decade Mandić recorded an album of children's music Deca bez adrese (Children without an Address) with popular children's entertainer and TV personality Branko Kockica, and in 1989 he again collaborated with his old friend Dušan Prelević who wrote a screenplay for the movie Poslednji krug u Monci. Mandić recorded the movie's title track "Odlazim, a volim te", which became a sizable commercial hit. The song, along with some other material that Mandić used in the movie, all came from the recordings he made with different musicians such as Chick Corea, Herbie Hancock, and Pat Metheny while staying in the United States during the late 1980s.

In the early 1990s, he became involved with Serbian paramilitary leader Željko Ražnatović "Arkan", whom he knew since childhood. Mandić was often seen wearing the Serbian Volunteer Guard uniform, and even made a couple of trips to the front-lines in Slavonia, where according to most accounts, his role was distributing food and cigarettes in the Guard's Erdut headquarters.

Towards the end of 1991, Mandic became an extended member of Riblja Čorba. The idea was to include Mandić in the creative process of the band's planned farewell album Labudova pesma by having him write and compose half of the songs, and later, upon its release, tour as their keyboards player. The material was recorded in Vienna, but as it was being prepared for wide release a huge row erupted between Mandić and band leader Bora Đorđević. As a result, Mandić demanded that all his tracks be removed, and even obtained a court-ordered junction prohibiting their release. In the end, the album's released version contained only eight tracks – half of the originally planned number, and it also ended up not being Riblja čorba's last as they soon changed their minds, deciding to continue playing and recording. On the other hand, raw studio versions of Mandić's unreleased tracks have since then become rare and valuable collector's items.

=== Occasional brief appearances ===
Over the next period Mandić placed music on the back-burner completely, choosing to live off releasing greatest hits compilations. In 1993, the compilation album Smejem se, a plakao bih was released, which sold surprisingly well in the hyperinflation-ridden FR Yugoslavia. In 1994, the compilation was reissued on CD as The Best Of, featuring the previously never officially released, although already widely played hit "Odlazim, a volim te".

In 1997, Mandić finished the recording of his fourth studio album, with the working title Kad ljubav ubije (When Love Kills). The album featured the material recorded in the United States during the late 1980s, as well as new material, and featured guest appearances by Freddie Hubbard, Vlatko Stefanovski, Bebi Dol and Radomir Mihailović Točak. The album, however, remains unreleased until the present day.

In 2004, the 1993 best-of was reissued again as Best Of, featuring one new track, "Ako lažem, tu me seci " ("If I'm Lying"). The video for the song featured pop singer Ksenija Pajčin.

At the end of 2007, Mandić made another partial comeback with a song "Vreme za ljubav ističe" ("Time for Love Is Running Out"), which featured folk singer Svetlana "Ceca" Ražnatović on vocals. The song was released, alongside Mandić's old hits, on the compilation album Vreme za ljubav ističe. Promoting the release of Vreme za ljubav ističe, Mandić stated that this does not mean he is returning to a full singing career that ended in 1985, also stating that he might release Kad vreme ljubav ubije.

In 2010, Mandić wrote the song "Probudi se na čas" ("Wake Up for a Moment"), dedicated to deceased Macedonian pop singer Toše Proeski. He performed the song, with guest appearances by Bebi Dol on vocals and Željko Mitrović on guitar, on a concert held in Skopje and dedicated to Proeski.

== Legacy ==
Serbian glam metal band Karizma covered Mandić's song "Ljuljaj me nežno" on their 1992 album U snovima (In the Dreams). Serbian pop rock band covered Mandić's song "Nije za nju" on their 1993 album Šta bih dao da sam na tvom mjestu (What Would I Give to Be in Your Shoes). Croatian funk band Fali V covered Mandić's song "Sve je propalo" on their 1999 album Visočije od kolena (Up the Knees). Serbian rock singer Viktorija covered Mandić's song "Poludeću" on her 2000 live album Nostalgija (Nostalgia). The song "Odlazim, a volim te" was sampled by the Serbian hip hop band Sha-Ila in their track of the same title, released on their 2000 album Totalito Pervertito. Serbian gothic metal band Darkshines recorded a cover of the song "Pitaju me, pitaju", releasing it as a single in 2011.

The book YU 100: najbolji albumi jugoslovenske rok i pop muzike (YU 100: The Best albums of Yugoslav pop and rock music) features two Oliver Mandić albums: Probaj me (polled No. 15) and Sve najbolje (polled No. 51).

The B92 Top 100 Domestic Songs list features three songs by Mandić: "Nije za nju" (polled No. 53), "Osloni se na mene" (polled No. 59) and "Smejem se, a plakao bih" (polled No. 67). In 2011, the song "Osloni se na mene" was voted, by the listeners of Radio 202, one of 60 greatest songs released by PGP-RTB/PGP-RTS during the sixty years of the label's existence.

The lyrics of the song "Govor tvog tela" ("Your Body Language"), written by Marina Tucaković, were featured in Petar Janjatović's book Pesme bratstva, detinjstva & potomstva: Antologija ex YU rok poezije 1967 - 2007 (Songs of Brotherhood, Childhood & Offspring: Anthology of Ex YU Rock Poetry 1967 – 2007).

== Personal life ==
Since the late 1990s, Mandić has been active as a club owner and restaurateur.

On 27 December 2010, Mandić's partner Maja Kozlica gave birth to their daughter.

== Discography ==
=== With Oliver ===
==== Singles ====
- "Tajna" / "Prošlo je sve" (1974)
- "Ljuljaj me nežno" / "Šuma" (1978)
- "Sutra imam prazan stan" / "Osloni se na mene" (1979)
- "Ne daj mu", double A side (sa Dođe mi da vrisnem tvoje ime (1985))

=== Solo ===
==== Studio albums ====
- Probaj me (1981)
- Zbog tebe bih tucao kamen (1982)
- Dođe mi da vrisnem tvoje ime (1985)
- Deca bez adrese (1988; with Branko Milićević)

==== Compilations ====
- Sve najbolje (1987)
- Smejem se, a plakao bih (1993)
- The Best Of (1994)
- The Best Of (2001)
- Vreme za ljubav ističe (2007)
- Ono što ti nisam rekao (2014)

==== Other appearances ====
- "Mandarina i banana" (1990; with Marina Perazić; on Udvoje je ljepše: 12 popularnih dueta)
