= Tunel (band) =

Serbian and Yugoslav rock band

- The 1984–1987 Tunel lineup, from left to right: Ljuba Ninković, Vladimir Janković, Vladimir Negovanović and Steva Stevanović

Background information
- Origin: Belgrade, SR Serbia, SFR Yugoslavia
- Genres: Rock
- Years active: 1980–1992
- Labels: PGP-RTB, Jugodisk, Raglas Records, Long Play
- Past members: Ljuba Ninković; Vladimir Janković; Steva Stevanović; Vladimir Negovanović; Predrag Guculj

Tunel (Serbian Cyrillic: Тунел, trans. Tunnel) was a Serbian and Yugoslav rock band formed in Belgrade in 1980.

Tunel was formed as a supergoup consisting of a former S Vremena Na Vreme member Ljuba Ninković (guitar), a former Crni Biseri member Vladimir Janković "Vlada Džet" (bass guitar) and a former SOS member Steva Stevanović (drums). In 1984 the band was joined by guitarist Vlada Negovanović, who was replaced by Predrag Guculj in 1987. Tunel ended their activity in 1992, when Ninković started working with the reunited S Vremena Na Vreme. During their career the band released five studio albums and had several hit songs.

== History ==
=== 1980–1992 ===
The band was formed in 1980 by a former S Vremena Na Vreme member Ljuba Ninković (vocals, guitar), a former Crni Biseri member Vladimir Janković "Vlada Džet" (vocals, bass guitar) and a former SOS (embryonic Riblja Čorba) member Steva Stevanović (drums). The band presented themselves with melodic classic rock-inspired sound, and during its initial years performed mostly on music festivals.

In 1982 they released their debut album, Noćni prolaz (Night Passage), produced by Robert Nemeček (formerly of Dogovor iz 1804., Pop Mašina and Rok Mašina), through Jugodisk record label. Five tracks were written by Ninković and four by Janković. The album brought minor hits "Natali", "Radio", "Svako je zna" ("Everybody Knows Her"), and erotic song "Volim sax" ("I Love Sax"). Noćni prolaz also featured a cover of Steppenwolf song "Born to Be Wild". In 1983 the band released their second studio album, Niz tri tamne ulice (Along Three Dark Streets), also produced by Nemeček and also through Jugodisk. Besides the tracks written by Ninković and Janković, the album featured "A sad je svemu kraj", a Serbo-Croatian cover of Bobby Womack's song "It's All Over Now".

In 1984 the band was joined by guitarist Vladimir Negovanović, a former member of the bands Butik (Boutique), Doktor Spira i Ljudska Bića and Slađana Milošević's backing band Ljudi (People). The new lineup recorded the album Elektirčna iluzija (Electric Illusion), produced by Đorđe Petrović and released in 1984 through PGP-RTB. In 1987 the band released the album Do poslednje kapi... (Till the Last Drop...), produced by the band themselves and YU Grupa guitarist Bata Kostić, through PGP-RTB. The album featured a Serbian language cover of Willie Dixon's song "Little Red Rooster", entitled "Crveni petao" ("Red Rooster"). The album featured Kostić on guitar and Ninković's former bandmate from S Vremena Na Vreme Asim Sarvan on vocals as guest musicians. In May 1985 Ninković participated in YU Rock Misija, the Yugoslav contribution to Live Aid, and on June 15 Tunel, alongside 23 other acts, performed on Red Star Stadium, on the concert which was a part of YU Rock Misija.

In 1987 Negovanović moved to Dejan Cukić's Spori Ritam Band (in 1995 he would join Bajaga i Instruktori) and the band's new member became Predrag Guculj, who previously performed with Rambo Amadeus. In 1991 the band released the album Bubnjevi preko reke (Drums on the Other Side of the River), produced by themselves, through PGP-RTB. The song "Bela lađa" ("White Boat") featured rock veteran Branko Marušić "Čutura" on vocals. The album featured a Serbo-Croatian cover of The Doors song "Love Street", entitled "Ulica ljubavi". The song "Još uvek (volim sax)" ("I Still (Love Sax)"), with similar erotic lyrics as "Volim sax", featured guitarist Borko Mitić. The album featured Bilja Krstić, Asim Sarvan, and Željko Marinković on backing vocals and Bajaga i Instruktori member Saša Lokner on keyboards.

In 1992 Ninković started working with reunited S Vremena Na Vreme and Tunel ended their activity.

=== Post breakup ===
After Tunel disbanded, Janković started working as a Radio 202 editor and host. With guitarist Boban Birtašević (a former Siluete member) and drummer Jovan Ljubisavljević "Kića" (a former Crni Biseri member) he formed his Vlada Jet Band. With the new band he recorded six studio albums, the 2005 album Brand 40 featuring Ninković on backing vocals. Ninković took part in S Vremena Na Vreme 1990s and 2010s reunions. He died on 6 January 2026, aged 76.

In 1996 Raglas Records released Tunel greatest hits compilation It's Only Rock 'n' Roll.

In 2021 Long Play record label released the album Uživo 1982–1985 (Official Bootleg) (Live 1982–1985 (Official Bootleg)), featuring recordings from the band's performance in Kulušić club in Zagreb and from perofmances on youth work actions in Negotin, Paraćin and Pirot.

In 2022, Fidbox record label released the compilation album Antologija on vinyl as a double album. In 2023, Antologija was released on CD by PGP-RTS.

== Discography ==
=== Studio albums ===
- Noćni prolaz (1982)
- Niz tri tamne ulice (1983)
- Električna iluzija (1984)
- Do poslednje kapi... (1987)
- Bubnjevi preko reke (1991)

=== Live albums ===
- Uživo 1982–1985 (Official Bootleg)

=== Compilation albums ===
- It's Only Rock 'n' Roll (1996)
- Antologija (2022)

=== Singles ===
- "Radio" / "Svako je zna" (1980)
- "Natali" / "Svako je zna" (1981)
- "Srećna Nova godina" / "A ti me samo gledaš" (1981)
- "Ne plaši se" / "Jo Jo" (1987)
