= Pesme bratstva, detinjstva & potomstva: Antologija ex YU rok poezije 1967 - 2007 =

Pesme bratstva, detinjstva & potomstva: Antologija ex YU rok poezije 1967–2007
- Author: Petar Janjatović
- Language: Serbian, Croatian
- Published: 2008 (Vega media)
- Publication place: Serbia
- Media type: Print
- Pages: 336 pages
- ISBN: 978-86-86667-38-0
- OCLC: 461637566
- Preceded by: Pesme bratstva & detinjstva: Antologija rok poezije SFR Jugoslavije 1967–1991

Pesme bratstva, detinjstva & potomstva: Antologija ex YU rok poezije 1967–2007 (trans. Songs of Brotherhood, Childhood & Offspring: Anthology of Ex YU Rock Poetry 1967–2007) is a book by Serbian author, journalist and music critic Petar Janjatović. Published in 2008, the book is the second, expanded edition of Janjatović's 1993 book Pesme bratstva & detinjstva: Antologija rok poezije SFR Jugoslavije 1967–1991 (Songs of Brotherhood & Childhood: Anthology of Rock Poetry in SFR Yugoslavia 1967–1991). The book features lyrics by acts from the former Yugoslav rock scene and the scenes of the successor states.

== Background ==
In the original (1993) introduction, entitled "Od Osmeha do plavog neba" ("From Smile to Blue Sky", referencing Grupa 220's song "Osmijeh" and Obojeni Program's track "Nebo, nebo plavo je"), Janjatović states his intention of presenting a selection of poetic lyrics written by Yugoslav rock musicians. According to the author, the appearance of poetic lyrics in Yugoslav rock occurred right away with the release of the first full-length Yugoslav rock album – Grupa 220's Naši dani (Our Days) – despite the fact that during the 1960s and early 1970s the poets among Yugoslav rock lyricists were still few and far between. In Janjatović's opinion, it was not until punk rock and new wave took root in the country that Yugoslav acts made artistic rock lyrics imperative.

Additionally, Janjatović stated:

I wrote the above on 21 March 1991, sitting on a faraway Thai island, as an introduction to the anthology. During the 1990/1991 winter, I enjoyed listening to old as well as new Yugoslav rock'n'roll albums, and I gradually made a selection of what I considered to be the most valuable lyrics of that musical genre. I then submitted the manuscript to the publisher and went on a holiday. When I returned, everything changed. Yugoslavia began breaking apart and who could care about something as demode as its rock anthology. And then, during the winter of 1992/1993, I returned to these poems, realizing that now the book has a completely different meaning, close to the one of Yugonostalgia. And that after all that happened, a large number of these songs can be read in a new, moving way. And that this is a poetic history of the rock'n'roll scene that ceased to exist in June 1991.

In the 2008 addendum to the original introduction, Janjatović wrote:

So, here is the second, expanded edition. After all these years, everything is different, but the scene managed to survive. As did some of us. Most of the lyrics written after 1991 are filled with bitterness and wisdom. The time was such that it couldn't have been any different.

== Authors ==
Author	Lyrics written for	Number of poems
Drago Mlinarec	Grupa 220, Drago Mlinarec	12
Davorin Popović	Indexi	1
Maja Perfiljeva	Indexi	2
Kornelije Kovač	Korni Grupa	3
Dado Topić	Time	3
Boris Turina	Drugi Način	2
Marina Tucaković	Trio DAG, Oliver Mandić	5
Ljuba Ninković	S Vremena Na Vreme	5
Vojislav Đukić	S Vremena Na Vreme	1
Miomir Đukić	S Vremena Na Vreme	2
Milan Čukić	S Vremena Na Vreme	1
Duško Trifunović	Bijelo Dugme	2
Goran Bregović	Bijelo Dugme	8
Bora Đorđević	Suncokret, Riblja Čorba	12
Milić Vukašinović	Vatreni Poljubac	1
Andrej Šifrer	Andrej Šifrer	5
Tomaž Pengov	Tomaž Pengov	3
Marko Brecelj	Buldožer	1
Boris Bele	Buldožer	3
Dušan Mihajlović "Spira"	Suncokret, Doktor Spira i Ljudska Bića	5
Tomaž Domicelj	Tomaž Domicelj	2
Pero Lovšin	Pankrti	5
Zoran Predin	Lačni Franz, Zoran Predin	15
Vlada Divljan	Idoli	4 (1 with Srđan Šaper)
Srđan Šaper	Idoli	8 (1 with Vlada Divljan, 3 with Nebojša Krstić)
Nebojša Krstić	Idoli	3 (all with Srđan Šaper)
Dušan Kojić "Koja"	Šarlo Akrobata, Disciplina Kičme	5
Milan Mladenović	Šarlo Akrobata, Katarina II, Ekatarina Velika; Rex Ilusivii, Angel's Breath	22
Branimir "Džoni" Štulić	Azra, Branimir Štulić	26
Srđan Gojković "Gile"	Električni Orgazam	9
Đorđe Otašević	Električni Orgazam	1
Paraf	Paraf	5
Massimo Savić	Dorian Gray	1
Zoran "Kiki" Lesendrić	Piloti	1
Petar i Zli Vuci	Petar i Zli Vuci	1
Termiti	Termiti	2
Beograd	Beograd	1
Bojan Vasić	Bezobrazno Zeleno	2
Zoran Cerar	TV Moroni	1
Zoran Vulović	U Škripcu	1
Milan Delčić	U Škripcu	1
Željko Brodarić "Jappa"	Metak	1
Srđan Saher	Haustor, Vještice	8 (1 with Darko Rundek)
Darko Rundek	Haustor, Darko Rundek	27 (1 with Srđan Saher)
Jasenko Houra	Prljavo Kazalište	6
Slobodan Tišma	Luna	4
Goran Stefanovski	Leb i Sol	1
Vlatko Stefanovski	Leb i Sol	1
Predgrag Milosavljević	Galija	1
Radoman Kanjevac	Galija	11 (1 with Bata Zlatković)
Bata Zlatković	Galija	1 (with Radoman Kanjevac)
Marko Vuksanović	Automobili	2
Momčilo Bajagić "Bajaga"	Bajaga i Instruktori, Riblja Čorba	11
Nikola Čuturilo	Nikola Čuturilo	1
Zlatko Arslanagić	Crvena Jabuka	2
Nele Karajlić	Zabranjeno Pušenje, No Smoking Orchestra	5
Mirko Srdić	Zabranjeno Pušenje	1
Sejo Sexon	Zabranjeno Pušenje	5
Branko Đurić	Bombaj Štampa	2
Rambo Amadeus	Rambo Amadeus	4
Elvis J. Kurtović	Elvis J. Kurtović & His Meteors	1
Nebojša Antonijević "Anton"	Partibrejkers	1
Zoran Kostić "Cane"	Partibrejkers	4
Davor Gobac	Psihomodo Pop	1
Franci Blaškovič	Gori Uši Winnetou	1
KUD Idijoti	KUD Idijoti	2
Aleksandar Milovanović "Sale Veruda"	KUD Idijoti	2
Branislav Babić "Kebra"	Obojeni Program	4
Ritam Nereda	Ritam Nereda	3
Aleksandar Janković	Instant Karma	2
Edi Maružin	Gustafi	1
Nikola Vranjković	Block Out	9
Bjesovi	Bjesovi	2
Darkwood Dub	Darkwood Dub	1
Nebojša Simeunović "Sabljar"	Dža ili Bu	7
Goran Vasović	Eva Braun	12 (7 with Petar Dolinka, Milan Glavaški and Ljubomir Rajić, 5 with Petar Dolinka)
Petar Dolinka	Eva Braun	12 (7 with Goran Vasović, Milan Glavaški and Ljubomir Rajić, 5 with Goran Vasović)
Milan Glavaški	Eva Braun	7 (all with Goran Vasović, Petar Dolinka and Ljubomir Rajić)
Ljubomir Rajić	Eva Braun	7 (all with Goran Vasović, Petar Dolinka and Milan Glavaški)
Nikola Pavković	Oružjem Protivu Otmičara	3
Slobodan Vukosavljević	Džukele	3
Zoran Radović	Presing	1
Marko Šelić "Marčelo"	Marčelo	5
Boris Mladenović	Jarboli	1 (with Danijel Kovač)
Danijel Kovač	Jarboli	1 (with Boris Mladenović)
Ivan Stojković "St"	Goribor	3
Boris Vlastelica	Repetitor	2

=== Notable absences ===
In a 2012 interview, Janjatović was asked about the absence of Đorđe Balašević's lyrics. Janjatović answered:

Initially, I planned to include a large number of Balašević's song lyrics in the book, especially the political ones he wrote during the 1990s. When we saw how many of poems there are, a serious question of copyright arose. So it would be better if Balašević himself made a book with a choice of his lyrics.
