= DAG (Yugoslav band) =

Yugoslav rock band

Background information
- Also known as: Trio DAG
- Origin: Belgrade, SR Serbia, SFR Yugoslavia
- Genres: Acoustic rock; progressive rock; art rock
- Years active: 1972-1975
- Labels: PGP-RTB, ZKP RTLJ
- Past members: Dragan Popović; Grujica Milanović; Aleksandar Milanović

DAG (Serbian Cyrillic: ДАГ), also known as Trio DAG (Трио ДАГ) were a Yugoslav rock band formed in Belgrade in 1972. Although short-lasting, they were one of the most notable representatives of the Yugoslav acoustic rock scene.

The band consisted of Dragan Popović (guitar, vocals) and brothers Grujica (percussion, vocals) and Aleksandar Milanović (guitar, vocals). Initially, the band performed acoustic music, but on the recording of their only studio album, Sećanja (1974), they played electric instruments. The album, featuring poetic lyrics written by lyricist Marina Tucaković, was praised by the critics, but saw little commercial success, and Popović left the band, DAG ending their activity soon after.

== History ==
=== 1972-1975 ===
The band was formed in 1972 as an acoustic trio consisting of Dragan Popović (guitar, vocals), and brothers Grujica (percussion, vocals) and Aleksandar Milanović (guitar, vocals). They named the band after the initials of their first names (Dragan, Aleksandar, Grujica).

In 1972 the band released their debut 7-inch single, featuring the songs "Voz" ("Train") and "Smiljana" ("Resilient"). With the song "Rastanak" ("The Leave"), released on a 7-inch single in 1973, they won the third place at the 1973 Zagreb Festival. In 1974 they released their only studio album, Sećanja (Memories). Although they started their career as a part of the Belgrade acoustic rock scene, on the album they used electric instruments. The poetic lyrics were written by Marina Tucaković, and the album cover was designed by Grujica Milanović. The album was produced by the band members themselves with Boban Petrović, and featured numerous guests: Sloba Marković on keyboards, Robert Nemeček on bass guitar, Ljubomir Ristić on sitar, Branimir Malkoč on flute, and drummers Raša Đelmaš, Nikola Jager and Mihajlo Popović. Although praised by the music critics, the album saw little commercial success. After it was released, Popović left the band forming the acoustic band Maj (May) with Aleksandar Bijelić and Bane Zarin.

After Popović left the band, Milanović brothers recorded the single "Kako ti je ime, devojčice" ("What's Your Name, Little Girl") with popular singer Miki Jevremović. The B-side featured song "Za dečji san" ("For a Child's Dream") published under the DAG moniker. For a short period of time the brothers performed with the female singer Suzana Mančić. They made a brief reunion with Popović to record the single "Daj mi ruku" ("Give Me Your Hand"), ending their activity soon after its release in 1975.

=== Post breakup ===
Aleksandar Milanović sold part of his unrecorded songs to Oliver Mandić, and worked with him on his early albums as a guitarist and arranger. He wrote songs for numerous artists, including Dado Topić, Slađana Milošević, Jadranka Stojaković, and Dušan Prelević.

Dragan Popović, with the band Maj, recorded the single with the songs "Još uvek sanjam" ("I'm Still Dreaming") and "Vreme žetve" ("Time of Harvest"), and the song "A ja bih je ljubio" ("And I Would Kiss Her"), released on the various artists album Uspomene (Memories) dedicated to San vocalist Predrag Jovičić, who died in concert from an electric shock. With S Vremena Na Vreme, Maj performed in Atelje 212 play (Ne)sumnjivo lice (The (Un)Suspicious Person), directed by Zoran Radmilović. After Maj ended their activity, Popović worked as a music critic for Omladinske novine (Youth's Newspaper) and Mladost (Youth). He composed music for the Radio Belgrade show Index 202, four of them released on the various artists album Index 202 in 1981. During 1981 he worked with a short-lived band Dragstor (Drugstore), and later formed the band Lift (Elevator) with the bass guitarist Slobodan "Boba" Orlić. He participated in the recording of Doktor Spira i Ljudska Bića album Dijagnoza. During the 1980s he worked as a sound engineer in the Akademija Studio and composed children's music. In the 1990s he moved to Sweden, where he worked as an elementary school music teacher and for some time Ericsson company, continuing to compose, perform in clubs and act in theatre. In Sweden he founded Teater Kapija (Gate Theatre), and with the actress Janna Eriksson recorded the album Isabelle – A Desert Blues.

In 1994 DAG song "Daj mi ruku" appeared on Komuna compilation album Sve smo mogli mi: Akustičarska muzika (We Could Have Done All: Acoustic Music), which featured songs by Yugoslav acoustic rock acts.

In 2013 the album Sećanja was reissued on CD by Austrian record label Atlantide.

== Legacy ==
The lyrics of four songs by the band were featured in Petar Janjatović's book Pesme bratstva, detinjstva & potomstva: Antologija ex YU rok poezije 1967 - 2007 (Songs of Brotherhood, Childhood & Offspring: Anthology of Ex YU Rock Poetry 1967 - 2007).

== Discography ==
=== Studio albums ===
- Sećanja (1974)

=== Singles ===
- "Voz" / "Smiljana" (1972)
- "Rastanak" / "Svitanje" (1973)
- "Kako ti je ime devojčice" / "Za dečji san" (with Miki Jevremović, 1974)
- "Tragovi u pesku" / "I sad..." (1974)
- "Daj mi ruku" / "Jedan dan u Vojvodini" (1975)
