= Crni Biseri =

Serbian and former Yugoslav rock band

- Crni Biseri in 1968

Background information
- Also known as: VIS Crni Biseri, Denis
- Origin: Belgrade, SR Serbia, SFR Yugoslavia
- Genres: Rock and roll; beat music; rhythm and blues; rock; boogie rock
- Years active: 1963–1980 (Reunions: 1997)
- Labels: Jugoton, PGP-RTB, Studio B, Diskos, PGP-RTS
- Past members: Goran Vukićević; Predrag Jovanović; Ivan Božović; Slavko Božović; Vladimir Janković; Radan Valčić; Zoran Petković; Nenad Dukić; Jovan Ljubisavljević; Dragan Baletić; Dragan Batalo; Dragan Raičević; Branislav Živančević

Crni Biseri (Serbian Cyrillic: Црни Бисери, trans. The Black Pearls) were a Yugoslav rock band formed in Belgrade in 1963, notable as one of the pioneers of the Yugoslav rock scene.

The band started their career performing beat music, but later moved towards rhythm and blues. During the 1960s they became one of the most popular rock bands among Yugoslav youth. Although their popularity heavily declined with the arrival of new musical trends and the new generation of Yugoslav rock bands at the beginning of the 1970s, they were one of rare Yugoslav 1960s bands to continue their career into the late 1970s. Although they recorded a large number of EPs and 7" singles, they released their only full-length studio album in 1976, disbanding in 1980. The group made a one-off reunion in 1997, to perform a concert to be broadcast by Radio Television of Serbia.

== History ==
=== 1963–1970: beginnings, nationwide popularity ===
The band was formed in Belgrade at the end of 1963. The first lineup consisted of Goran Vukićević (acoustic guitar, keyboards and harmonica), Predrag "Krcko" Jovanović (drums) and brothers Ivan (guitar) and Slavko Božović (saxophone). The band chose their name after the 1958 Yugoslav film Black Pearls, directed by Svetomir Janjić, a story about a reform school teacher's efforts to bring a group of juvenile delinquents to the right path by teaching them diving. Crni Biseri had their first performance in the winter of 1963, in Belje, in Belgrade scouts winter house. Initially, the band performed without a bass guitarist, but were soon joined by bassist and vocalist Vladimir Janković, also known as "Vlada Džet", who got his nickname ("Džet" being a transliteration for Jet) after The Shadows bass guitarist Jet Harris. Crni Biseri had their first performance with Janković on 8 March 1964 in Vuk Karadžić Cultural Center. The band was soon after joined by singer Radan Valčić. This lineup of the band performed until the Autumn of 1965, when they moved from beat to rhythm and blues and started performing in the following lineup: Radan Valčić (vocals), Goran Vukićević (guitar), Vladimir Janković "Džet" (bass guitar, vocals), Zoran Petković (rhythm guitar) and Dragan "Krcko" Jovanović (drums).

On 23 January 1967, Crni Biseri took part in the battle of the bands festival Gitarijada, held at the Belgrade Fair, and were pronounced the best band by the jury. The runner-up band were Delfini from Split, who publicly claimed that the voting was rigged. Eventually, a "duel" of the two bands was organized, with Delfini winning the first place. In April of the same year, Crni Biseri released their debut EP, featuring covers of international hits, but also Janković's song "Ne odlazi" ("Don't Leave"), which was the result of the band's desire to be one of the first Yugoslav bands to record their own songs instead of covers of foreign songs. However, as, at the time, editors of Yugoslav record labels had little faith in Yugoslav bands' work, the members of Crni Biseri persuaded editors of the Jugoton record label to publish "Ne odlazi" telling them it is a cover of a little-known Bob Dylan song. Other songs released on the EP were "Srce bez ljubavi" ("Loveless Heart", a cover of "Here's a Heart" by Dave Dee, Dozy, Beaky, Mick & Tich), "Nisam onaj koga želiš" ("I'm Not the One You Want", a cover "It Ain't Me Babe" by Bob Dylan) and "Lepi flamingo" (a cover of "Pretty Flamingo" by Manfred Mann). The Serbo-Croatian lyrics for the songs were written by Leposava Stefanović, who would later gain fame as the leader of the dance troupe Lokice. The record was well received by the Yugoslav music press. Following the EP release, the band performed mostly in the club Euridika in Belgrade. During the same year, the band also appeared in the Black Wave film When I Am Dead and Gone directed by Živojin Pavlović, portraying a band which accompanies young singers on an audition, and appeared in the TV show Koncert za ludi mladi svet (Concert for Crazy Young People) performing their songs "Ringišpil" ("Carousel") and "Hey Girl", and a cover of the song "Wild Thing". In the video recorded for their version of "Wild Thing", the band performed while riding a moving locomotive.

In 1968, Valčić decided to leave the band in order to dedicate himself to his studies of medicine, and was replaced by the former Duka & Čavke (Duka & the Jackdaws) frontman Nenad "Duka" Dukić. Dukić had already gained some prominence on the Yugoslav music scene, with his song "San" ("A Dream") competing at Subotica Youth Festival. Dukić was a band member for only three months, but performed with the band on a joint concert with Džentlmeni in Belgrade Youth Center, and provided vocals for three cover songs released in 1968 on the band's second EP: "Dream" (a cover of Cupid's Inspiration song), "Moni, Moni" (a cover of Tommy James and the Shondells song "Mony Mony") and "I Wanna Be Free" (a cover of The V.I.P.'s song). The fourth song from the EP, "Nisam više taj" ("I'm not the One Anymore", a cover of "Suddenly You Love Me" by The Tremeloes), was previously recorded with Valčić. Although the EP received mixed reception by the music critics, the song "Nisam više taj" became a large hit for the band, spending several weeks on the top of the charts in radio shows Minimaks (Minimax) and Sastanak u devet i pet (Meeting at 9:05). After Dukić's departure, Valčić returned to the band, recording with them their third release, a 7-inch single with the songs "Moja mala ledi" (a cover of The Tremeloes' "My Little Lady") and "Moj svet nije tvoj svet" ("My World Is Not Your World", a cover of "This World Is My World" by The Bystanders). In 1968, the band also appeared in Stole Janković's film The Girl in the Park.

In 1969, Jovanović left the band, and the band's new drummer became Jovan Ljubisavljević "Kića", formerly of the band Gumene duše (Rubber Souls). In 1970, Valčić also left, being replaced by the former Juniori (Juniors) vocalist Dragan Baletić.

=== 1970–1980: decline in popularity, disbandment ===
Crni Biseri were among rare Yugoslav beat bands which would continue their career into the 1970s; however, the band's popularity heavily declined due to the growing popularity of Yugoslav progressive rock bands. During 1973, the band made a hiatus in their work due to Janković's and Baletić's mandatory stints in the Yugoslav People's Army. After the two returned from the army, the band continued their activity without Petković. For a certain time keyboardist Dragan Batalo performed with the band, but soon moved to Zlatni Prsti, and was replaced by keyboardist Dragan Raičević, a former Saphiri (The Sapphires) and Juniori member. In October 1976, Ljubisavljević left the band due to his army stint, and was replaced by Velibor "Boka" Bogdanović, who previously played in the bands Plavi Dečaci (Blue Boys), Duka & Čavke, Džentlmeni, YU Grupa, Opus and Dah. Having released their only full-length studio album, boogie rock-oriented Motorok (Motorock), in 1976, and the single "Ti si uvek htela sve" / "Moj brat i ja" ("You Always Wanted It All" / "My Brother and I"), Dragan Baletić left the band and was replaced by a former Op Cup member Branislav "Cile" Živančević. In 1977, the band recorded a 7-inch single featuring their English-language songs "Hush Hush Maria" and "Night in Casablanca" under the name Denis. Three years later, on 1 January 1980, Crni Biseri officially disbanded. After the group split up, for a short period of time Branislav Živančević and his backing band performed under the name Crni Biseri. However, other members of the group publicly disapproved the usage of the band's name, and Živanćevič's incarnation of the group ended their activity.

During their career, Crni Biseri held about 3.000 concerts, performing, besides Yugoslavia, in Malta, Tunisia and Morocco. They also wrote songs for several plays of the Belgrade Drama Theatre.

=== Post breakup ===
After he left Crni Biseri in 1968, Nenad Dukić withdrew from music, later starting a career of a film critic.

After Crni Biseri disbanded, Janković formed the band Tunel with former S Vremena Na Vreme member Ljuba Ninković and former SOS member Steva Stevanović. He started working as an editor on Radio 202, and later in the record company ITMM. With his former Crni Biseri bandmate Jovan Ljubisavljević "Kića" (drums) and former Siluete membet Boban Birtašević (guitar) he formed his Vlada Džet Band.

=== 1997 reunion and beyond ===
In 1997, the band reunited with both Dragan Baletić and Branislav Živančević on vocals to hold a concert in the club Crna Maca in Zemun. The concert was recorded and broadcast by Radio Television of Serbia. During the following year, the compilation album Crni Biseri was released, featuring several previously unreleased songs – "Moja draga" ("My Darling"), "Hey Girl", instrumental track "Mesto pod suncem" ("A Spot under the Sun", a cover of the theme from the 1959 film A Summer Place) and "Kamena vizija" ("Stone Vision", a cover of "Tips of My Fingers" by P. J. Proby), the latter two being their first ever studio recordings, made in 1965.

In 2008, Vladimir Janković published the autobiographical book Godine na 6 (The Years Beginning With 6), about the 1960s rock scene in Belgrade and his work with Crni Biseri. The book was released with a CD featuring songs from Crni Biseri's early releases and several previously unreleased tracks.

Dragan Baletić died on 14 May 2005. Jovan Ljubisavljević died on 15 September 2014. Predrag Jovanović died on 30 March 2021.

== Legacy ==
Crni Biseri song "Džudi, Džudi" was covered by Yugoslav and Serbian folk rock band Garavi Sokak on their 1991 album Pozdrav iz Sokobanje (Greetings from Sokobanja).

== Band members ==
- Goran Vukićević – guitar, acoustic guitar, keyboards, harmonica (1963–1980)
- Ivan Božović – guitar (1963–1965)
- Slavko Božović – saxophone (1963–1965)
- Dragan Jovanović "Krcko" – drums (1963–1968)
- Vladimir Janković "Džet" – bass guitar, vocals (1964–1980)
- Radan Valčić – vocals (1964–1968; 1968–1970)
- Zoran Petković – guitar (1965–1973)
- Jovan Ljubisavljević "Kića" – drums (1968–1976)
- Nenad Dukić – vocals (1968)
- Dragan Baletić – vocals (1970–1977)
- Dragan Batalo – keyboards (1974)
- Dragan Raičević – keyboards, vocals (1975–1980)
- Velibor Bogdanović "Boka" – drums (1976–1980)
- Branislav Živančević "Cile" – vocals (1977–1980)

== Discography ==
=== Studio albums ===
- Motorok (1976)

=== Compilation albums ===
- Crni Biseri (1998)

=== Extended plays ===
- Ne odlazi (1967)
- Nisam više taj (1968)
- Kišna noć (1972)

=== Singles ===
- "Moja mala ledi" / "Moj svet nije tvoj svet" (1968)
- "Tražimo sunce" / "Ram-dam-dam" (1969)
- "Poučna priča / "Čekanje" (1970)
- "Ona zna" / "Povratak" (1972)
- "Lutalica" / "Pismo devojci" (1973)
- "Večiti rok" / "Želim" (1975)
- "Dar-mar" / "Šta ću sad" (1975)
- "Džudi, Džudi" / "Nikada" (1976)
- "Mlinarev sin" / "Tiho muzika svira" (1976)
- "Ti si uvek htela sve" / "Moj brat i ja" (1977)
- "Katarina (Ne želi da živi više sa mnom)" / "Moreplovac" (1977)
- "Hush Hush Maria" / "Night in Casablanca" (as Denis, 1977)
- "Aspirin" / "Susret na uglu" (1978)
- "Tašta" / "Zimski dan" (1979)
