= Suncokret =

Yugoslav acoustic rock band

- Suncokret in 1976, from left to right: Gorica Popović, Bilja Krstić, Bora Đorđević, Bata Sokić, Nenad Božić and Snežana Jandrlić.

Background information
- Origin: Belgrade, SR Serbia, SFR Yugoslavia
- Genres: Acoustic rock, folk rock, rock
- Years active: 1975 – 1980 (reunions: 1995, 2011)
- Labels: ZKP RTLJ, Diskos, PGP-RTB, Suzy
- Past members: Bora Đorđević; Nenad Božić; Snežana Jandrlić; Vesna Rakočević; Bilja Krstić; Gorica Popović; Bata Sokić; Duško Nikodijević; Zoran Nikodijević; Ljubinko Milošević; Duda Bezuha; Vladimir Golubović; Branko Isaković; Ivan Vdović

Suncokret (Serbian Cyrillic: Сунцокрет; trans. Sunflower) was a Yugoslav acoustic rock band from Belgrade.

== Band history ==
=== 1975 — 1980 ===
The band was formed in 1975 by former Zajedno member Bora Đorđević (vocals and acoustic guitar), a former U Cvetu Mladosti member Nenad Božić (vocals and acoustic guitar) and female singers Snežana Jandrlić and Vesna Rakočević. After release of the single "Kara Mustafa", Vesna Rakočević left the band and joined Zdravo, and Bilja Krstić and Gorica Popović became new Suncokret members. At the half of 1976, they were joined by bass guitarist Bata Sokić.

The band released several successful singles, some of them inspired by traditional songs. In 1976, they appeared in Mića Milošević's film Tit for Tat, and some of their songs were used in the film. They performed at the 1976 BOOM Festival in Belgrade, and a live version of their song "Moj đerdane" ("(Oh) My Necklace") was released on the BOOM '76 live album.

Their debut album Moje bube (My Bugs) was released in 1977. Album featured previously released "Kara Mustafa" and "Moje tuge" ("My Sadnesses"), humorous songs "Vuk i krava" ("Wolf and Cow") and "Oglas" ("Ad") and ballads "Uspavanka" ("Lullaby"), "Ni sam ne znam kada" ("I Myself Don't Know When") and "Prvi sneg" ("First Snow"), the latter, written by Dušan Mihajlović "Spira", becoming one of Suncokret's signature songs. A live version of "Prvi sneg" was released on the BOOM '77 live album. After the album was released, keyboardist Duško Nikodijević and drummer Ljubinko Milošević became band's permanent members. In 1977, the band members refused to perform Đorđević's song "Lutka sa naslovne strane", so Đorđević and Biljana Krstić left the band and joined Rani Mraz, Đorđević remaining in Rani Mraz shortly and in 1978 forming rock band Riblja Čorba which will eventually become one of the top acts of the former Yugoslav rock scene.

Snežana Jandrlić continued to lead new, electricized Suncokret lineup, which featured Sokić, Nikodijević and former Tilt members Dušan "Duda" Bezuha (guitar) and Vladimir Golubović (drums). After Golubović and Bezuha left the band, bass guitarist Branko Isaković and drummer Ivan "Vd" Vdović became new Suncokret members, but after only two singles released, the band disbanded due to the members' discord.

=== Reunions (1995, 2011) ===
In 1995, Suncokret reunited for a performance in Belgrade Youth Center, on a concert which featured other acts from the 1970s acoustic rock scene. The lineup featured Bora Đorđević, Bata Sokić, Duda Bezuha, Gorica Popović, Snežana Jandrlić, Bilja Krstić and Vlajko Golubović.

In 2011, Suncokret reunited in the lineup featuring Gorica Popović, Biljana Krstić, Snežana Jandrlić, Bata Sokić and Nenad Božić, to perform at the 50th anniversary of Festival Omladina, performing the songs "Prvi sneg" and "Moje bube".

== Legacy ==
The album Moje bube was polled in 1998 as 78th on the list of 100 greatest Yugoslav popular music albums in the book YU 100: najbolji albumi jugoslovenske rok i pop muzike (YU 100: The Best albums of Yugoslav pop and rock music).

In 2006 the song "Prvi sneg" was ranked #70 on the B92 Top 100 Domestic Songs list.

"Uspavanka" and "Prvi sneg" lyrics were featured in Petar Janjatović's book Pesme bratstva, detinjstva & potomstva: Antologija ex YU rok poezije 1967 - 2007 (Songs of Brotherhood, Childhood & Offspring: Anthology of Ex YU Rock Poetry 1967 - 2007).

== Discography ==
=== Studio albums ===
- Moje bube (1977)

=== Singles ===
- "Kara Mustafa" / "Moje tuge" (1975)
- "Gde ćeš biti, lepa Kejo" / "Pusto more, pusti vali" (1976)
- "Rock 'n' Roll duku duku" / "Gili gili blues" (1976)
- "Oj, nevene" / "Tekla voda" (ZKP RTLJ 1976)
- "Imam pesmu za sve ljude" / "Čovek koga znam" (1978)
- "Dlakavo čudo" / "Noćna ptica" (1979)
- "Sviće novi dan" / "Tvoja mama gunđa protiv mene" (1979)

=== Other appearances ===
- "Moj đerdane" (BOOM '76, 1976)
- "Prvi sneg" (BOOM '77, 1977)
