= Njihovi dani =

Studio album by Bora Đorđević
- Released: 1996
- Recorded: Studio Pink, Zemun/Veselin Maldaner's Studio, Košutnjak
- Genre: Rock; Hard rock
- Length: 27:15
- Label: SIM Radio Bijeljina
- Producer: Bora Đorđević, Milan Popović, Miša Aleksić, Vlada Barjaktarević

Bora Đorđević chronology
Bora priča gluposti (1988)	Njihovi dani (1996)

Njihovi dani (Serbian Cyrillic: Њихови дани, trans. Their Days) is the first and only studio album released by Bora Đorđević. Although the album was recorded by the members of Đorđević's band Riblja Čorba, Đorđević decided to release the album in his own name, as the album criticizes the regime of the former president of FR Yugoslavia Slobodan Milošević and his wife Mirjana Marković. The album was released in Bosnia and Herzegovina through SIM Radio Bijeljina, in order to avoid political censorship.

The A side of the album was entitled Njegovi dani (His Days, referring to Slobodan Milošević) and the B side was entitled Njeni dani (Her Days, referring to Mirjana Marković). The album cover, designed by Jugoslav Vlahović and Boban Ristić, features the silhouettes of Milošević and Marković.

== Track listing ==
All the songs were written by Đorđević, except where noted.

1. "Diktator" ("Dictator") – 3:01
2. "Seljačine" ("Peasants") (V. Milatović, B. Đorđević) – 2:47
3. "Beograde, Beograde" ("Belgrade, Belgrade") (D. Jakšić, B. Đorđević) – 3:10
4. "Mesara Papak Bluz" ("Butcher Shop Blues") – 4:40
5. "Baba Jula" ("Grandma Jula") – 3:03
6. "Zabela" ("Prison") (V. Milatović, B. Đorđević) – 3:19
7. "Ko će koga" ("Who Will Whom") – 3:26
8. "Decu ti neću oprostiti" ("I Will Not Forgive You For The Children") – 4:01

== Personnel ==
- Bora Đorđević - vocals, producer
- Vidoja Božinović - guitar
- Miša Aleksić - bass guitar, producer
- Vlada Barjaktarević - keyboards, producer, recorded by
- Vicko Milatović - drums, backing vocals
- Marija Mihajlović - backing vocals
- Milan Popović - backing vocals, producer
- Minđušari members - backing vocals
- Dušan Suvajac - accordion
- Branko Marković - double bass (on track 8)
- Veselin Maldaner - recorded by
