= Bora priča gluposti =

Live album by Bora Đorđević
- Released: 1988
- Recorded: KST, Belgrade; May, 1988
- Genre: Performance poetry; comedy
- Length: 44:19
- Label: Helidon
- Producer: Boris Bele

Bora Đorđević chronology
Arsen & Bora Čorba Unplugged '87 (1987)	Bora priča gluposti (1988)	Njihovi dani (1996)

Bora priča gluposti (trans. Bora's Talking Rubbish) is the recording of the poetry evening Serbian and former Yugoslav rock musician Bora Đorđević held in KST in Belgrade in May 1988, released on compact cassette through Helidon in 1988.

== Track listing ==
=== Side A ===
1. "Gluposti" - 22:08

=== Side B ===
1. "Još malo gluposti" - 22:11
