= PGP-RTB =

Yugoslav record label

- Founded: 1959
- Status: Changed its name to PGP-RTS in 1993
- Genre: Various
- Country of origin: SFR Yugoslavia
- Location: Belgrade
- Official website: PGP-RTS official page

PGP-RTB (Serbo-Croatian Cyrillic: Продукција грамофонских плоча Радио телевизије Београд, romanized: Produkcija gramofonskih ploča Radio televizije Beograd lit. 'Production of gramophone records of Radio Television of Belgrade') was a major state-owned record label and chain record store in the former SFR Yugoslavia, based in Belgrade, Socialist Republic of Serbia. After the breakup of Yugoslavia, in 1993, the company changed its name to PGP-RTS (Produkcija Gramofonskih Ploča Radio-Televizije Srbije).

== History ==
PGP-RTB was established in 1959, as the music production branch of the national Radio-Television Belgrade.

After the breakup of Yugoslavia, in 1993, the company changed its name to PGP-RTS (Produkcija Gramofonskih Ploča Radio-Televizije Srbije), which is the music production branch of the national Radio Television of Serbia.

== Artists ==
PGP-RTB is notable for signing numerous eminent former Yugoslav pop and rock, as well as folk acts. Some of the artists that have been signed to PGP-RTB include:

- Alisa
- Amajlija
- Silvana Armenulić
- Arsen Dedić
- Atomsko Sklonište
- Bajaga i Instruktori
- Đorđe Balašević
- Banana
- Bastion
- Bebi Dol
- Bele Vrane
- Bel Tempo
- Beograd
- Bezobrazno Zeleno
- Bulevar
- Buldožer
- Ceca
- Crni Biseri
- Crveni Koralji
- Dejan Cukić
- Čista Proza
- Nikola Čuturilo
- Zdravko Čolić
- Dado Topić
- DAG
- Delfini (Split band)
- Disciplin A Kitschme
- Divlji Anđeli
- Doktor Spira i Ljudska Bića
- Drugi Način
- Džentlmeni
- Ekatarina Velika
- Elipse
- Formula 4
- Galija
- Generacija 5
- Gordi
- Griva
- Grupa I
- Heroina
- Heroji
- Igra Staklenih Perli
- Miroslav Ilić
- Indexi
- Jakarta
- Jugosloveni
- Jutro
- Karizma
- Kerber
- Tereza Kesovija
- Korni Grupa
- Miha Kralj
- Bilja Krstić
- La Strada
- Laboratorija Zvuka
- Laki Pingvini
- Leb i sol
- Lepa Brena
- Lutajuća Srca
- Mama Rock
- Oliver Mandić
- Đorđe Marjanović
- Srđan Marjanović
- Merlin
- Slađana Milošević
- Toni Montano
- O'Hara
- Oktobar 1864
- Osmi Putnik
- Osvajači
- Parni Valjak
- Partibrejkers
- Piloti
- Pomaranča
- Pop Mašina
- Porodična Manufaktura Crnog Hleba
- Poslednja Igra Leptira
- Propaganda
- Predmestje
- Dušan Prelević
- Radomir Mihajlović
- Rambo Amadeus
- Rani Mraz
- Riblja Čorba
- Roze Poze
- San
- September
- Siluete
- Slomljena Stakla
- Smak
- Boba Stefanović
- Perica Stojančić
- Suncokret
- S Vremena Na Vreme
- Šaban Šaulić
- Miladin Šobić
- Tako
- Time
- Tunel
- Neda Ukraden
- U škripcu
- Vampiri
- Van Gogh
- Vatreni Poljubac
- Viktorija
- Vlada i Bajka
- Warriors
- YU Grupa
- Zana
- Zdravo
- Zebra
- Zlatko Pejaković
- Zlatni Prsti
- Vesna Zmijanac
- Zona B

PGP-RTB has also released some albums by eminent classical musicians at that time, such as Milenko Stefanović and Ernest Ačkun.

Like other former Yugoslav labels, PGP-RTB also had a licence to release foreign titles for the Yugoslav market including notable international popular music stars such as: ABBA, Joan Armatrading, Louis Armstrong, Joan Baez, Bee Gees, Blood, Sweat & Tears, Bon Jovi, James Brown, John Coltrane, Cream, Def Leppard, Dire Straits, Bryan Ferry, Peter Gabriel, Genesis, Gorky Park, Jimi Hendrix, INXS, Jean-Michel Jarre, Joan Jett and the Blackhearts, Elton John, Kiss, Amanda Lear, The Moody Blues, Nazareth, Billy Ocean, Mike Oldfield, The Platters, The Police, Roxy Music, Metallica, Steve Miller Band, Rainbow, The Shadows, Siouxsie and the Banshees, Status Quo, Rod Stewart, Sting, The Style Council, Styx, Tangerine Dream, Thin Lizzy, The Who, Y&T, and others.

== Competition ==
Other major labels in the former Socialist Federal Republic of Yugoslavia were: Jugodisk from Belgrade, Jugoton and Suzy from Zagreb, Diskoton from Sarajevo, ZKP RTLJ from Ljubljana, Diskos from Aleksandrovac, and others.

== See also ==
- List of record labels
