= Jugosloveni =

Yugoslav rock band

- Jugosloveni in 1986, from left to right: Dragan Latinčić, Zoran Paunović, Goran Milanović and Nenad Maričić

Background information
- Origin: Belgrade, SR Serbia, SFR Yugoslavia
- Genres: Rock; pop rock; folk rock
- Years active: 1986–1989
- Labels: Diskoton, Komuna Belgrade, PGP-RTB, PGP-RTS, City Records
- Past members: Zoran Paunović; Nenad Maričić; Dragan Latinčić; Goran Milanović; Dragan Deletić; Dejan Jeremić; Tomo Babović; Duško Maslać; Nenad Novaković; Đorđe Nejković; Goran Vranić; Dejan Maksimović; Predrag Gostović

Jugosloveni (Serbian Cyrillic: Југословени; trans. Yugoslavs) was a Yugoslav rock band formed in Belgrade in 1986.

Formed and led by vocalist Zoran Paunović, Jugosloveni released three studio albums during the band's initial run, scoring a nationwide hit with the song "Jugosloveni", before splitting up in 1989. Seventeen years after the group's disbandment, Paunović re-recorded some of the band's old songs, releasing them on a studio album under Jugosloveni moniker. In 2013, Paunović, with a group of younger musicians, recorded his latest studio album, releasing it once again under the name Jugosloveni.

== Band history ==
=== 1986–1989 ===
The band was formed in 1986 by vocalist Zoran Paunović. Paunović was previously the drummer and songwriter for the band Magično Oko (Magical Eye), releasing two albums with the group—their 1984 self-titled debut and the 1985 album Nešto iz ljubavi (Something out of Love)—and performing with them on the 1985 charity concert at Red Star Stadium which was a part of YU Rock Misija, a Yugoslav contribution to Live Aid.

After initial lineup changes, Jugosloveni recorded their debut album, entitled Došlo mi je da se napijem (I Feel like Getting Drunk), in the lineup featuring Zoran Paunović (vocals), Nenad Maričić (guitar), Dragan Latinčić (bass guitar) and Goran Milanović (drums). The album featured guest appearances by Kornelije Kovač on keyboards and Vlada Negovanović on guitar. The songs were classic rock-oriented, while lyrics dealt with social topics and featured Belgrade slang. The album brought the band's biggest hit, "Jugosloveni", which described the Yugoslav mentality in humorous manner.

Prior to the recording of the second Jugosloveni album, Paunović fired the complete lineup of the group, forming a new one, featuring Dragan Deletić (formerly of the heavy metal band Warriors, guitar), Dejan Jeremić (drums) and Tomo Babović (keyboards). However, for the recording of the album Vruće osvežavajuće (Hotly Refreshing), Paunović opted to work with studio musicians – Vlada Negovanović (guitar), Dragoljub Đuričić (drums), Ted Jani (guitar), Zoran Radomirović (bass guitar) and Saša Lokner (keyboards).

At the time of the recording of Jugosloveni's third album, the band's lineup featured Paunović, Jeremić, Duško Maslać (guitar), Nenad Novaković (bass guitar) and Đorđe Nejković (keyboards). The album, entitled Krici i šaputanja (Screams and Whispers), was recorded in cooperation with studio musicians and released in 1989. After the album release, the band ended their activity.

=== Post breakup, Paunović's new works ===
After Jugosloveni disbanded, Paunović retired from the scene. Nenad Novaković, the bass guitarist in the band's last lineup, joined Dejan Cukić's backing band Spori Ritam Band, playing with them until late 1990. After leaving Spori Ritam Band, he devoted himself to guitar manufacturing and moved to Germany. In Germany, he became a member of Mladen Vojičić "Tifa"'s backing band. He died of diabetes in 1995.

Paunović returned to music in 1998, when he wrote songs for and produced the album Ljubav bez pokrića (Love Without Coverage) by singer Aleksandra Radić. In 2006, he re-recorded some of Jugosloveni's old songs in pop folk manner, releasing them under Jugosloveni moniker on the album Igralište (Playground). In 2013, he recorded the album Tvoje ime je ljubav (Your Name Is Love) with Goran Vranić (guitar), Dejan Maksimović (drums) and Predrag Gostović (bass guitar), once again releasing it under the name Jugosloveni. In 2020, with the band Zabranjeno Pušenje he recorded the song "Balkan", released as a single.

== Discography ==
=== Studio albums ===
- Došlo mi je da se napijem (1986)
- Vruće osvežavajuće (1987)
- Krici i šaputanja (1988)
- Igralište (2006)
- Tvoje ime je ljubav (2013)

=== Compilations ===
- Došlo mi je da se napijem (1997)
