= Gorica Popović =

Serbian actress

- Горица Поповић
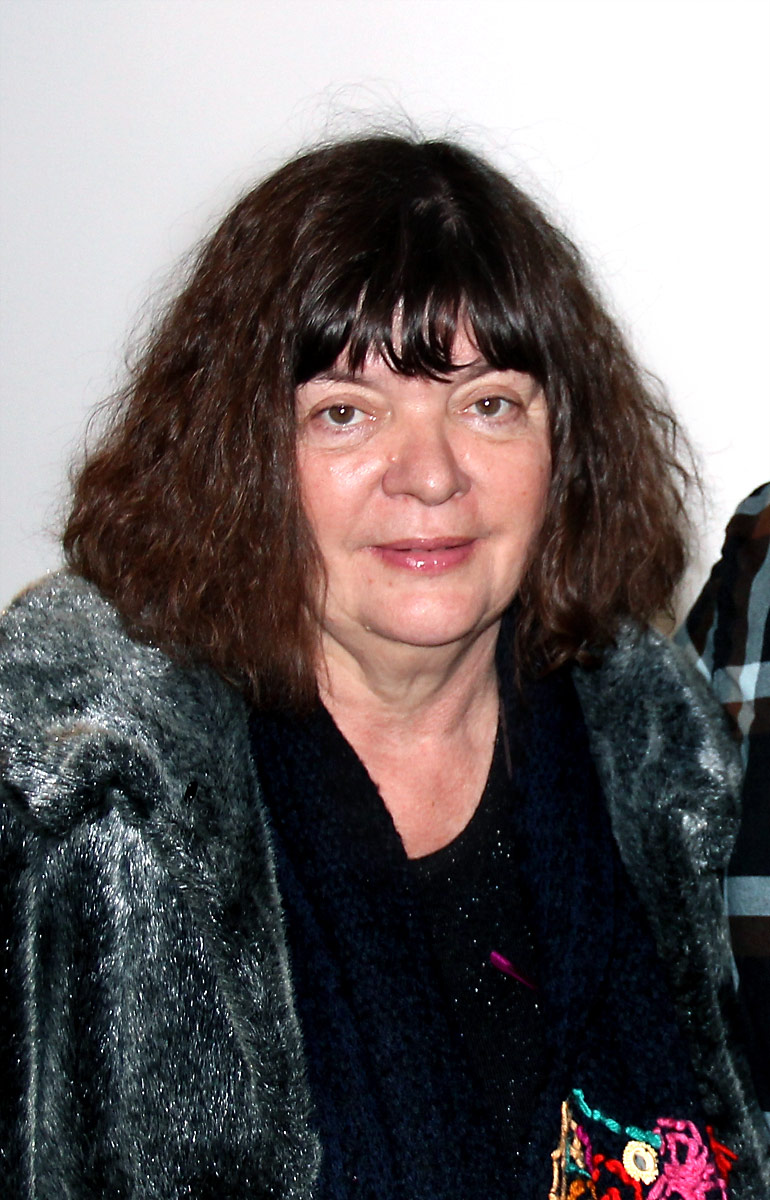
- Born: 13 August 1952 (age 74); Kragujevac, PR Serbia, FPR Yugoslavia
- Education: Faculty of Dramatic Arts
- Occupation: Actress
- Years active: 1969–present

Gorica Popović (Serbian Cyrillic: Горица Поповић; born 13 August 1952) is a Serbian theatre, television and film actress. She was also a former member of the rock band Suncokret.

== Selected filmography ==
=== Film ===
Year	Title	Role	Notes
1981	The Fall of Italy	Božica	
1984	The End of the War	Milka Lazarević	
1988	The Dark Side of the Sun	Nina	
1989	Battle of Kosovo	Princess Milica	
