= Bora Đorđević =

Serbian singer-songwriter and frontman of Riblja Čorba (1952–2024)

Bora Đorđević Бора Ђорђевић
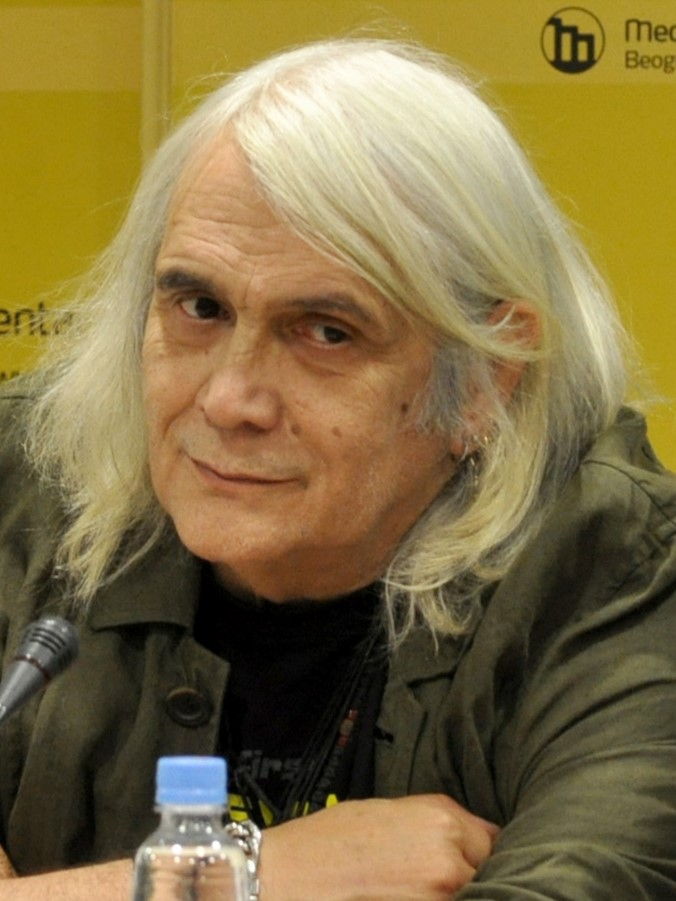
- Đorđević in 2013

Background information
- Also known as: Bora Čorba
- Born: Borisav Đorđević; 1 November 1952; Čačak, PR Serbia, Yugoslavia
- Died: 4 September 2024 (aged 71) Ljubljana, Slovenia
- Genre: Rock
- Occupations: Singer, songwriter
- Instruments: Vocals, acoustic guitar, harmonica, percussion
- Years active: 1974–2024
- Labels: ZKP RTLJ, Diskos, PGP RTB, Jugoton, Helidon, WIT, Samy, Biveco, SIM Radio Bijeljina, Čorba Records, M-Factory, Radiogod Music, Hi-Fi Centar, City Records
- Formerly of: Zajedno, Suncokret, Rani Mraz, Riblja Čorba
- Spouse(s): Dragana Đorđević (m. 1977; div. 2007) Aleksandra Savić (m. 2009; div. 2014) Dubravka Milaković (m. 2016)

Borisav "Bora" Đorđević (Serbian Cyrillic: Борисав, Бора Ђорђевић; 1 November 1952 – 4 September 2024), also known as Bora Čorba (Serbian Cyrillic: Бора Чорба), was a Serbian rock musician, singer-songwriter and poet. He was best known as the frontman of the rock band Riblja Čorba.

== Early life ==
=== Čačak years ===
Đorđević was born in Čačak in 1952 to machinist father Dragoljub and mother Nerandža, who taught Serbo-Croatian and Russian.

At the age of thirteen, he formed his first band, Hermelini ("The Ermines"), with Borko Ilić (lead guitar), Prvoslav Savić (rhythm guitar), and Aca Dimitrijević (drums). Đorđević played bass guitar, and the band's sound was influenced by the Zagreb-based beat band Roboti.

Two years later, Đorđević switched to rhythm guitar and began writing song lyrics and poetry. One of his earliest poems, "Moje tuge", would later be recorded as a song and released on the band Suncokret's debut single "Kara Mustafa" / "Moje tuge", as well as included on their debut album Moje bube. After Hermelini, Đorđević played with numerous Čačak-based bands: Vesnici Ljubavi, Safiri, Dečaci sa Morave, and Čačanski Plemići. For a time, he was a member of PORS (Poslednji Ostatak Romantičnog Sveta, "The Last Remnant of a Romantic World") with Radomir Mihailović Točak on guitar.

Simultaneously, along with a group of friends, teenage Đorđević began breaking and entering into apartment units around his hometown of Čačak, looking to steal money and other valuables. Some of the money he obtained by stealing was later used for purchasing musical equipment. After three years of committing burglaries, the group was arrested and charged as juvenile delinquents. Đorđević spent seven days in prison detention before being released to await sentencing. The court gave the teenager no jail time, ordering him to undergo "enhanced parental supervision and occasional future assessment by the social services". Upon being released from prison detention, teenage Đorđević was promptly expelled from the gymnasium he had been attending.

=== Move to Belgrade ===
Đorđević's parents decided to move the family to Belgrade, where he enrolled at the Fifth Belgrade Gymnasium. For the first three years upon arriving in Belgrade, he didn't participate in any music-related activities.

At the time of his matriculation, nineteen-year-old Đorđević auditioned for the Atelje 212 staging of the Jesus Christ Superstar rock opera, landing one of the apostle roles. Featuring Korni Grupa singer Zlatko Pejaković in the lead role of Jesus Christ, Branko Milićević as Pontius Pilate, and acoustic singer-songwriter Srđan Marjanović as one of the priests, the show premiered in June 1972. It would be performed 21 times over the following twelve months until its final show in June 1973.

Đorđević would continue acting in theatre, mostly as an extra, appearing in Atelje 212 plays Purpurno ostrvo, Tom Pejn, and Caca u metrou.

== Early career ==
=== Zajedno ===
In late March 1973, twenty-year-old Đorđević formed the acoustic rock band Zajedno ("Together") with three female vocalists—Ivana Kačunković alongside twin sisters Vukica "Viki" and Gordana "Goca" Stefanović—and keyboardist Đorđe Petrović, all fellow high school students at the Fifth Belgrade Gymnasium. The band later joined Dragoslav Vuckovic vocal, acustic quitar, and composer. Initially, the band's activity mostly centred around recording jingles for radio shows. On invitation by the forty-year-old established actor Zoran Radmilović—whom young Đorđević had met earlier while participating in the Jesus Christ Superstar staging at Atelje 212—the band joined a conceptual theatre tour named Selu u pohode. Featuring a somewhat hippie vibe, the summer 1973 tour, that in addition to Zajedno members and Radmilović also featured painter Zagorka Stojanović, visited numerous remote Socialist Republic of Serbia villages with the aim of exposing their inhabitants to various forms of arts and culture such as acoustic music, painting, and theatre.

Zajedno's debut release, a seven-inch single with tracks "Vizija" and "Goro moja", was released in 1974 by PGP RTB. Đorđević composed the music for the A-side track while the B-side track used the lyrics from the eponymous poem by Aleksa Šantić. With liner notes written by radio disk jockey Zoran Modli, who used the opportunity to draw comparisons to YU Grupa's debut single from four years prior, the release brought Zajedno a small measure of prominence. In May 1974, Zajedno members wrote the music for the theatre play Bonton (ili kako se ponašati prema osobama suprotnog pola), starring Feđa Stojanović and Ružica Sokić, that was staged on Atelje 212's secondary 'Theatre in the Basement' stage. The play was performed 43 times over the following two years until the final show in May 1976 with Zajedno members — Đorđević, Petrović, and Ivana Kačunković — in addition to Kačunković's sister Jasna appearing in acting roles as singers and musicians on stage.

While playing in Zajedno', young Đorđević worked numerous temporary side jobs. He was part of the production crew of the Radio Belgrade show Veče uz radio that had been created, hosted, and produced by the Yugoslav rock'n'roll media pioneers Nikola Karaklajić and Peca Popović. Đorđević additionally filed radio reports from acoustic music festivals in Sivac, wrote articles for the Džuboks magazine about Yugoslav acoustic rock scene, and wrote a number of jingles for Beograd 202 and Studio B.

He left Zajedno in late 1974, and was replaced by Dragoslav Vuckovic.

=== Suncokret ===
In January 1975, Đorđević formed the acoustic rock band Suncokret ("Sunflower"). They gained popularity with a folk rock repertoire featuring Đorđević's humorous lyrics.

Suncokret worked with radio DJ Zoran Modli, whom Đorđević had met a few years earlier when Modli produced Zajedno's debut single. Naming their collaborative act Hajduk Stanko i Jataci, Suncokret and Modli released the seven-inch single "Na putu za Stambol" / "Anđelija, čuvaj se Turaka". Yet another Suncokret's single with Modli, "Rock and roll duku duku" / "Gili, gili bluz", was released under the name Zoran Modli i Suncokret.

With Suncokret, Đorđević recorded three more singles and album Moje bube.

=== Rani Mraz ===
Đorđević left Suncokret after the band refused to perform his song "Lutka sa naslovne strane". He accepted Đorđe Balašević's invitation and, with another former Suncokret member, female vocal Bilja Krstić, became a member of Balašević's band Rani Mraz. This was the most famous, but a short-lasting Rani Mraz lineup, and aside from Đorđe Balašević, Bora Đorđević and Bilja Krstić, it featured female vocal Verica Todorović. This lineup held several performances in Dom omladine and Student's Cultural Centre in Belgrade. Đorđević performed the songs "Lutka sa naslovne strane", "Mirno spavaj" and "Zvezda potkorvlja i suterena" (all of which eventually ended up on Riblja Čorba's debut album Kost u grlu) and Balašević entertained the audience with his humorous stories. This Rani Mraz lineup recorded the famous song "Računajte na nas", which praised the People's Liberation War from a slightly different perspective than that of habitual socialist realism, and soon became an anthem of the Yugoslav youth. This lineup also recorded a single with the songs "Oprosti mi, Katrin" and "Život je more".

== Riblja Čorba ==
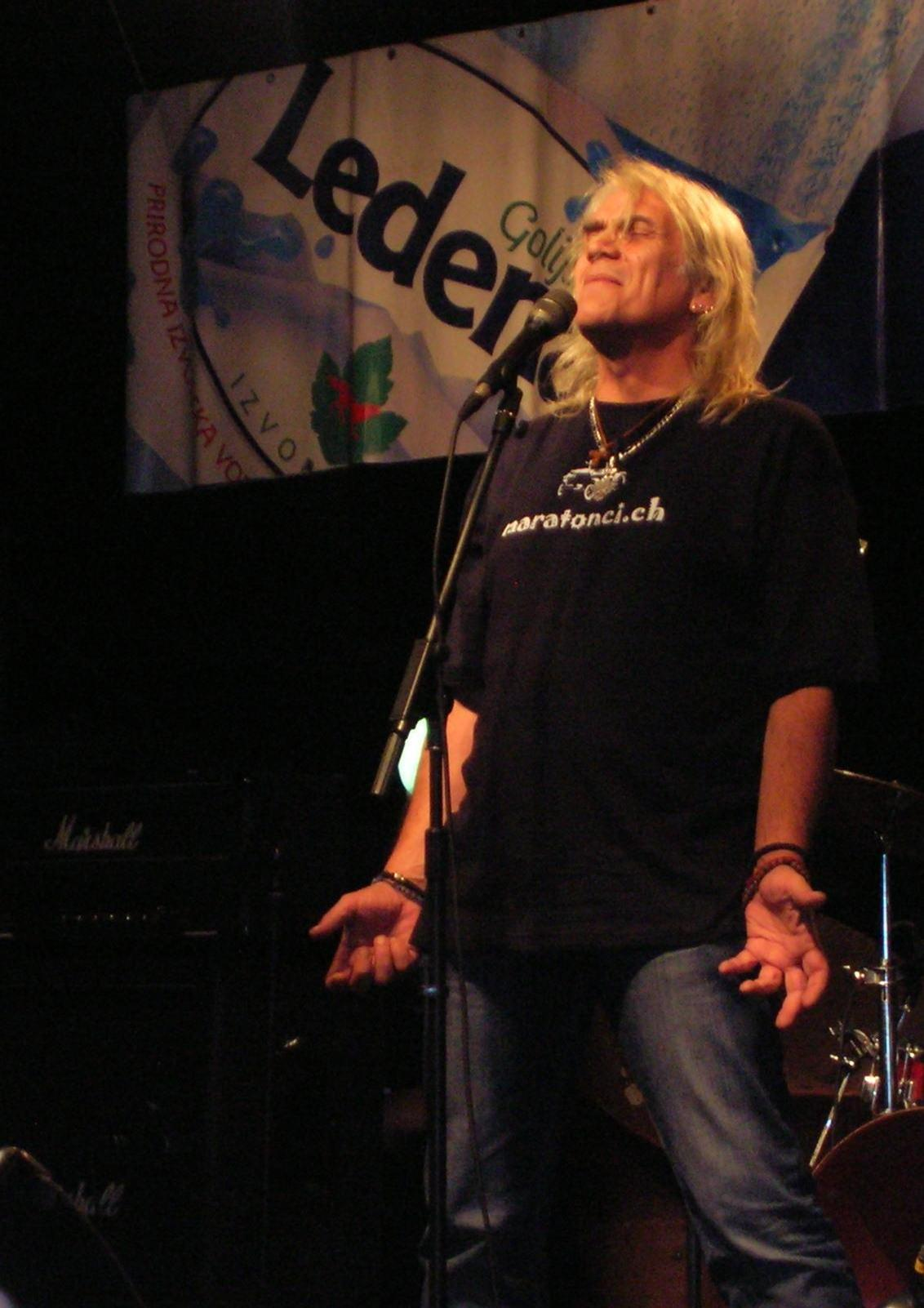
Bora Đorđević in concert, 2008

After Rani Mraz's performance at the Split music festival, and only forty-five days spent with the band, Đorđević left the band. Returning to Belgrade, he formed the hard rock band Riblja Čorba with SOS members Miša Aleksić, Rajko Kojić and Vicko Milatović. Their debut album Kost u grlu saw huge success and the band became very popular in only a couple of months. The band's growth in popularity also manifested in Đorđević's alcoholism, which had, together with his provocative lyrics, caused him to become one of the most controversial musicians in Yugoslavia. He remained the frontman and leader of Riblja Čorba from its formation to his death in 2024. His last performance was in Šamac, Bosnia and Herzegovina on 29 June 2024.

== Solo projects ==
Đorđević's unplugged performance with Arsen Dedić in Terazije Theatre in 1987 resulted in a famous bootleg album, Arsen & Bora Čorba Unplugged '87. Bora priča gluposti, released in 1988, features a recording of his poetry performance. In 1996 he released Njihovi dani, on which he demonstrated his anti-Milošević attitudes.

== Literary work ==
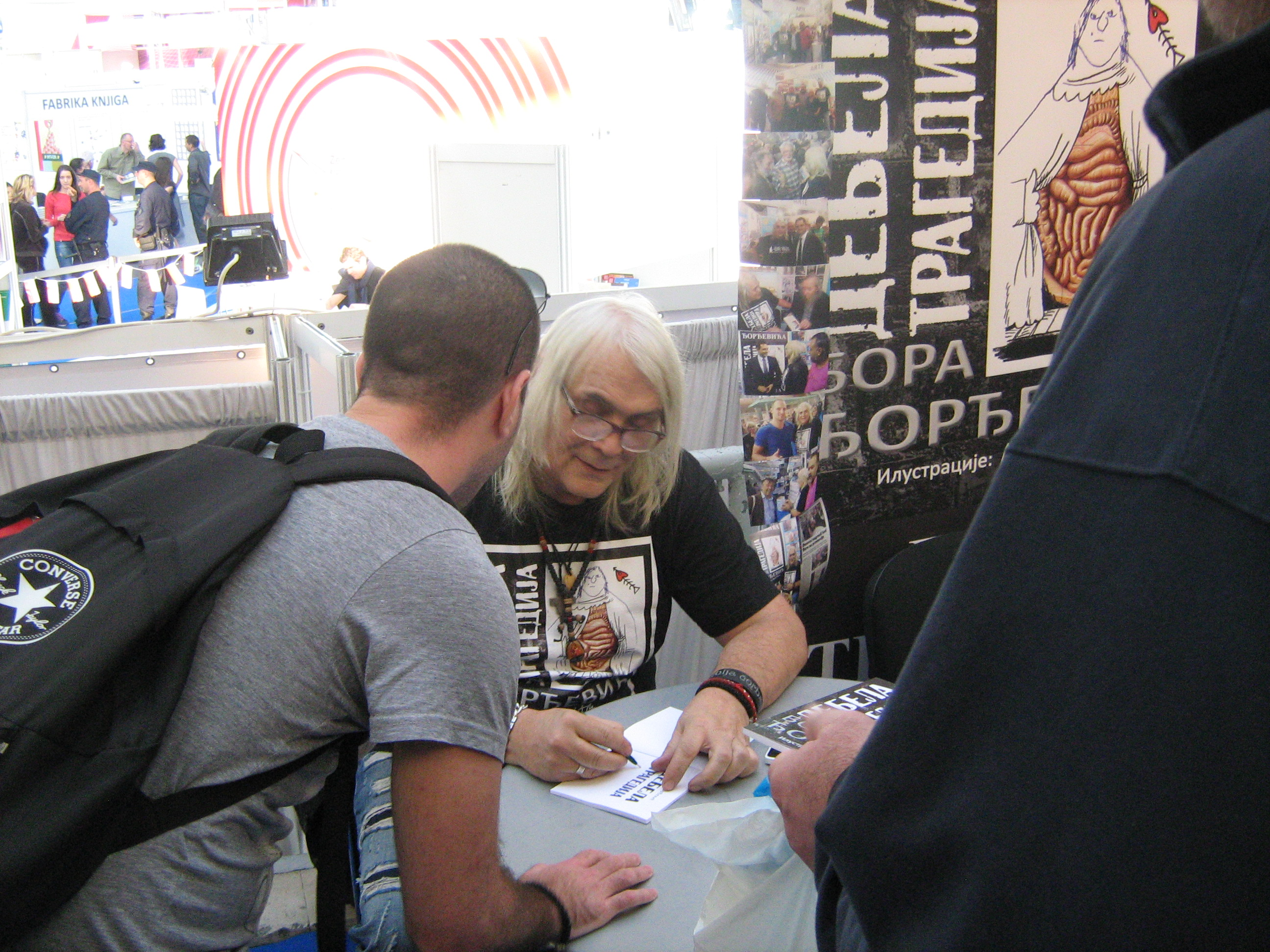
Đorđević signing his books at the Belgrade Book Fair, 2013

Đorđević released his first book of poems, Ravnodušan prema plaču ("Apathetic towards Crying"), in 1985.

In 1987 he released his second book of poems, Hej, Sloveni ("Hey, Slavs"), and in 1988 became a member of the Association of Writers of Serbia (UKS). Đorđević, reputedly, wrote the application on a table napkin. His membership in the Association of Writers of Serbia was not well received by some of the members.

Đorđević released eight more books:

- Prvih deset godina je najteže ("The First Ten Years Are the Hardest"),
- Neću ("I Don't Want To")
- Psihopata i lopata ("A Psychopath and a Shovel")
- Srbi bez muke ("Serbs without a Sweat")
- Brebusi
- Šta je pesnik hteo da kaže ("What did the Poet Mean")
- Debela tragedija ("Fat Tragedy")
- Pusto ostrvo ("Deserted island"), for which he was awarded the Great Ivo Andrić Award in 2018.

== Politics and controversy ==
Because of his provocative social and political lyrics, his support for Serbian nationalism coupled with his opposition to communism and Slobodan Milošević, as well as his political involvement in the Democratic Party of Serbia, Đorđević was a subject of many controversies:

- In 1984, after the release of Večeras vas zabavljaju muzičari koji piju, the state's censors declared songs "Mangupi vam kvare dete" and "Besni psi" ethically unacceptable. "Besni psi" caused an international scandal. Because of the lyrics "Grčki šverceri, arapski studenti, negativni elementi, maloletni delikventi i besni psi" ("Greek smugglers, Arabian students, negative elements, juvenile delinquents and mad dogs"), the embassies of three Arabian countries and Zaire protested, complaining that Bora Đorđević had equated foreign students with mad dogs. The Yugoslav Ministry of culture ordered an analysis of the song by the experts.
- In 1985, record label Jugoton refused to publish four songs on Riblja Čorba's album Istina, thus prompting the band's re-signing with PGP-RTB, which refused to record only one song, "Snage opozicije" ("Opposition Forces"), which was not officially published until the issue of the compilation album Treći srpski ustanak in 1997.
- In 1987, Đorđević was indicted for "disturbing the public" when he read his poems in Sava Centar, however the charges were dropped because he was reading poems already published in his books and in various magazines.
- In 1988, after reading his poems in Bar, he was indicted for "insulting the working people of Yugoslavia", but these charges were also dropped.
- After the beginning of the Yugoslav Wars, Đorđević became an active supporter of the Serbian troops in Republika Srpska and Republika Srpska Krajina which he demonstrated by recording controversial songs "E moj druže zagrebački" (which was recorded as a response to Jura Stublić's song "E moj druže beogradski") and "Ljetovanje" with the band Minđušari from Knin. Though, he was also strongly opposed to then-Serbian president Slobodan Milošević and his administration, demonstrating his attitude by writing a number of anti-government songs released on the Riblja Čorba albums Zbogom, Srbijo, Ostalo je ćutanje and Nojeva barka and by publishing Njihovi dani in his own name rather than that of his band in 1996. In 1997, Riblja Čorba issued a compilation album Treći srpski ustanak ("The Third Serbian Uprising"), which features a selection of Riblja Čorba's political songs recorded and released between 1981 and 1997.
- After the political changes in Serbia, he became the Deputy to Dragan Kojadinović, the Serbian Minister of Culture, in 2004. However, Đorđević was forced to resign from the position the next year, after accusing the journalists of the television station B92 of treason and holding anti-Serbian politics.
- In April 2019, Đorđević, along with other Riblja Čorba members, played in a public meeting of support to the current president of Serbia, Aleksandar Vučič. This was followed by media controversy, and divided opinions about Đorđević's participation in such act. Đorđević defended himself stating that he in fact is not member or supporter of any political party in Serbia, and that he participated in it from merely patriotic reasons.
- On 14 September 2021, Đorđević participated in a closed political gathering by the neofascist Leviathan Movement. Đorđević has already previously met with its leader Pavle Bihali multiple times and stated his support for them.

== Awards ==
In 2021, he was awarded the Order of Karađorđe's Star.

== Personal life and death ==
Bora Đorđević was married to Dragana Đorđević for 30 years. They shared a son and a daughter from Dragana's first marriage. They divorced in February 2007. Soon afterwards, on 23 March 2007, Dragana ended her life by mixing alcohol and prescription drugs.

In 2009, Đorđević married Aleksandra Savić, twenty-eight-years his junior, whom he had met in 2007 while touring the United States with Riblja Čorba. During early 2014, it was reported that the couple was splitting up after four and a half years of marriage. This was confirmed by Đorđević in April 2014, several days after the divorce had been finalized.

Shortly after, Đorđević confirmed speculations that he had a new girlfriend, Dubravka Milaković, from Slovenia. In May 2016, the couple married in a private ceremony on the Greek island of Santorini. Many songs on Riblja Čorba latest studio album Da tebe nije ("If It Were Not For You"), Đorđević wrote and dedicated to his third wife. The album cover also contains a drawn picture of her. Since marrying Milaković, Đorđević divided his time between Belgrade and Ljubljana.

At the end of August 2024, Đorđević was admitted to a hospital in Ljubljana due to acute exacerbation of chronic obstructive pulmonary disease (COPD). He died from pneumonia in the morning of 4 September, at the age of 71.

== Discography ==
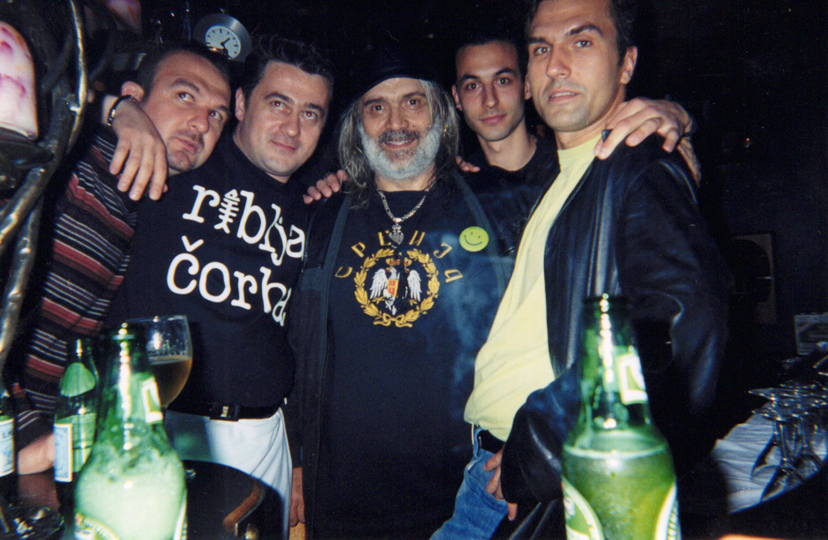
Bora Đorđević with fans in Toronto, 2003

=== Zajedno ===
==== Singles ====
- "Vizija" / "Goro moja" (1974)

=== Suncokret ===
==== Albums ====
- Moje bube (1977)

==== Singles ====
- "Kara Mustafa" / "Moje tuge" (1975)
- "Gde ćeš biti, lepa Kejo" / Pusto more, pusti vali" (1976)
- "Rock 'n' Roll duku duku" / Gili gili blues" (1976)
- "Oj, nevene" / "Tekla voda" (1976)

=== Rani Mraz ===
==== Singles ====
- "Računajte na nas" / "Strašan žulj" (1978)
- "Oprosti mi Katrin" / "Život je more" (1978)

=== Riblja Čorba ===
==== Studio albums ====
- Kost u grlu (1979)
- Pokvarena mašta i prljave strasti (1981)
- Mrtva priroda (1981)
- Buvlja pijaca (1982)
- Večeras vas zabavljaju muzičari koji piju (1984)
- Istina (1985)
- Osmi nervni slom (1986)
- Ujed za dušu (1987)
- Priča o ljubavi obično ugnjavi (1988)
- Koza nostra (1990)
- Labudova pesma (1992)
- Zbogom, Srbijo (1993)
- Ostalo je ćutanje (1996)
- Nojeva barka (1999)
- Pišanje uz vetar (2001)
- Ovde (2003)
- Trilogija (2007)
- Minut sa njom (2009)
- Uzbuna! (2012)
- Da tebe nije (2019)

=== Solo ===
==== Studio albums ====
- Njihovi dani (1996)

==== Live albums ====
- Arsen & Bora Čorba Unplugged '87 (with Arsen Dedić, 1987)
- Bora priča gluposti (1988)
