= Petar Janjatović =

Serbian author

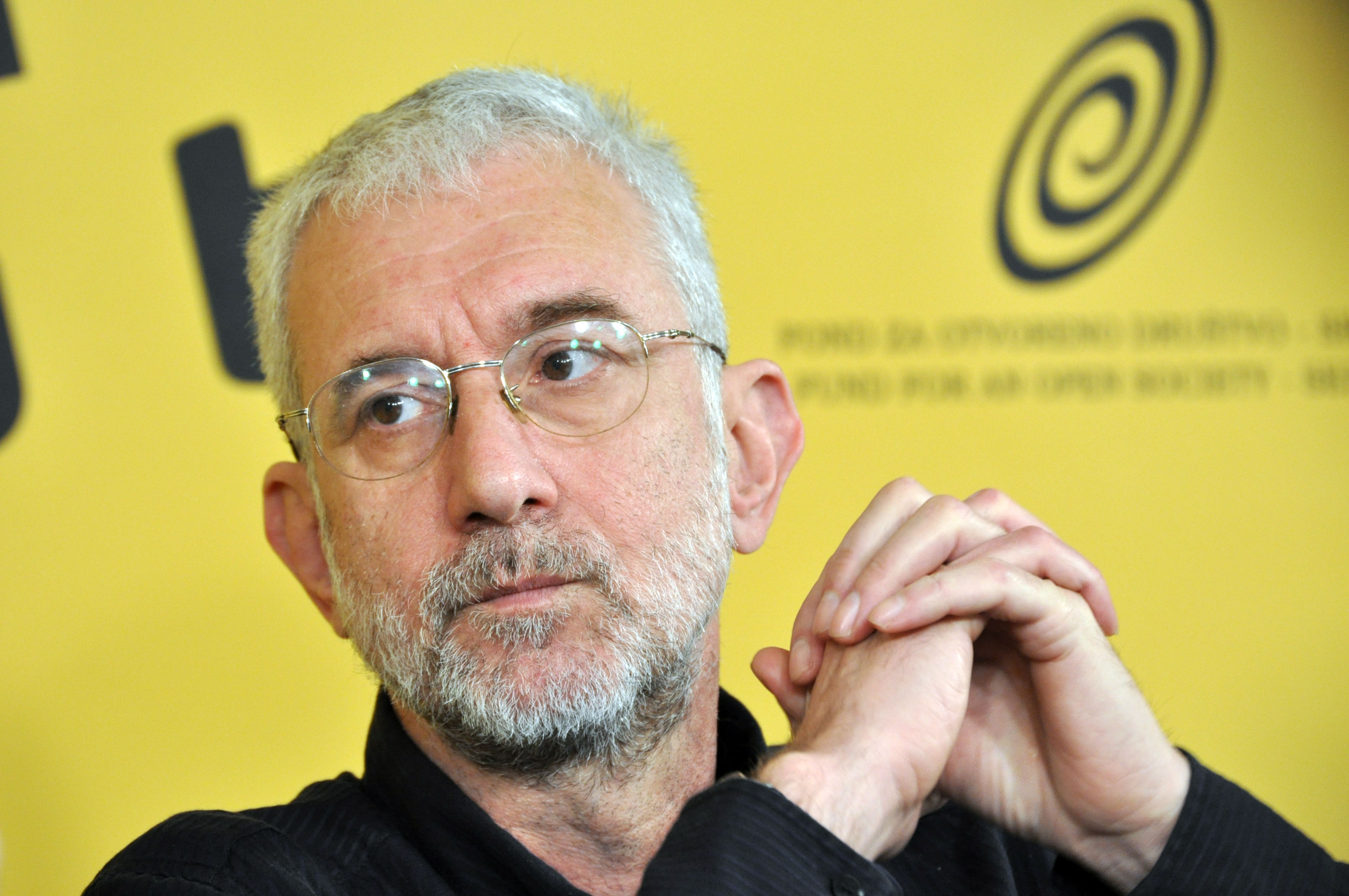
- Janjatović in 2008.
- Native name: Петар Јањатовић
- Born: June 30, 1956 (age 70) Belgrade, SR Serbia, Yugoslavia
- Occupation: author, journalist, music critic

Petar Janjatović (born June 30, 1956, in Belgrade) is a Serbian author, journalist, and music critic.

== Biography ==
Janjatović was born in Belgrade on June 30, 1956.

=== Journalism ===
As a teenager, he contributed to Radio Beograd show Veče uz radio (Evening by the Radio). He wrote for music magazines Džuboks, Rock, X zabava and Ukus nestašnih, but also for Start, Politikin Zabavnik, NIN, Vreme, Duga, Reporter, Super Tin and Politika.

In 1993, he left Radio Beograd, and during the 1990s worked on radio stations Politika, Zrenjanin and Pančevo. From 1997 to 2002 he was the music editor on Radio Pančevo. From 2006 to 2012, he, together with Tomislav Grujić, on Radio B92, had a show Juboks (Yubox), which dealt with pop and rock scene of SFR Yugoslavia successor states. During the 2000s, he was a correspondent for Billboard, Radio Free Europe and BBC.

=== Publishing ===
In 1983, Janjatović, together with writer David Albahari and music critics Darko Glavan and Dragan Kremer, published the book Drugom stranom: Almanah novog talasa u SFRJ (Via Other Side: The Almanac of new wave in SFRY).

In 1993, he published the book Pesme bratstva & detinjstva: Antologija rok poezije SFR Jugoslavije 1967 – 1991 (Songs of Brotherhood & Childhood: Anthology of Rock Poetry in SFR Yugoslavia 1967 – 1991). The second edition of the book, entitled Pesme bratstva, detinjstva & potomstva: Antologija ex YU rok poezije 1967 - 2007 (Songs of Brotherhood, Childhood & Offspring: Anthology of Ex YU Rock Poetry 1967 – 2007) was published in 2008.

In 1998, he published the book Ilustrovana YU rock enciklopedija 1960 – 1997 (Illustrated Rock Encyclopedia 1960–1997). The book saw two more editions: Ilustrovana ex YU rock enciklopedija 1960 – 2000 (2001) and Ex YU rock enciklopedija 1960 - 2006 (2007).

=== Other activities ===
In 1990, he was the editor of the last edition of Festival Omladina. Since 2003, he is the editor of the Serbian branch of record label Dallas Records. From 2003 to 2005, he was a member of the jury in the TV contest Idol. He is an author of several short stories, published in magazine Stav and various authors book Meni pričaš?! (Kikinda Short 04).

He describes himself as a Yugo-futurist.

== Books ==
- Drugom stranom: Almanah novog talasa u SFRJ (Via Other Side: The Almanac of New Wave in SFRY, with David Albahari, Darko Glavan and Dragan Kremer, 1983)
- Pesme bratstva & detinjstva: Antologija rok poezije SFR Jugoslavije 1967 – 1991 (Songs of Brotherhood & Childhood: Anthology of Rock Poetry in SFR Yugoslavia 1967 – 1991, 1993)
- Ilustrovana YU rock enciklopedija 1960 – 1997 (Illustrated YU Rock Encyclopedia 1967 – 1997, 1998)
- Ilustrovana ex YU rock enciklopedija 1960 – 2000 (2001)
- Ex YU rock enciklopedija 1960 - 2006 (2007)
- Pesme bratstva, detinjstva & potomstva: Antologija ex YU rok poezije 1967 - 2007 (Songs of Brotherhood, Childhood & Offspring: Anthology of Ex YU Rock Poetry 1967 – 2007, 2008)
