= Timeline of progressive rock (1970–1979) =

This is a timeline of artists, albums, and events in progressive rock and its subgenres. This article contains the timeline for the period 1970–1979.

== Contents ==
1970 – 1971 – 1972 – 1973 – 1974 – 1975 – 1976 – 1977 – 1978 – 1979

- See also
- References

== 1970 ==
=== Newly formed bands ===
- Ange
- Catherine Ribeiro + Alpes
- Curved Air
- Electric Light Orchestra
- Emerson, Lake & Palmer
- Gentle Giant
- Grobschnitt
- Grupa Marina Škrgatića
- Jackson Heights
- Jane
- Jutro
- Kansas (Proto-Kaw)
- Khan
- Mogul Thrash
- Nirvana (Yugoslav band)
- Quiet Sun
- YU Grupa

=== Albums ===
Release Date	Artist	Album	Country
2 January 1970	Syd Barrett	The Madcap Laughs	United Kingdom
23 January 1970	Family	A Song for Me	United Kingdom
January 1970	Quill	Quill	US
January 1979	Aphrodite's Child	It's Five O'Clock	Greece
9 February 1970	The Mothers of Invention	Burnt Weeny Sandwich	US
February 1970	Van der Graaf Generator	The Least We Can Do Is Wave to Each Other	United Kingdom
13 March 1970	Egg	Egg	United Kingdom
30 March 1970	Miles Davis	Bitches Brew	US
March 1970	Gong	Magick Brother	France
March 1970	Quarteto 1111	Quarteto 1111	Portugal
24 April 1970	Jethro Tull	Benefit	United Kingdom
April 1970	Amon Düül II	Yeti	Germany
15 May 1970	King Crimson	In the Wake of Poseidon	United Kingdom
25 May 1970	Jean-Luc Ponty	King Kong: Jean-Luc Ponty Plays the Music of Frank Zappa	France
31 May 1970	Ahora Mazda	Ahora Mazda	Netherlands
May 1970	Quatermass	Quatermass	England
5 June 1970	Barclay James Harvest	Barclay James Harvest	England
5 June 1970	Procol Harum	Home	England
June 1970	Organisation	Tone Float	Germany
June 1970	Soft Machine	Third	United Kingdom
June 1970	The Nice	Five Bridges	England
1 July 1970	Traffic	John Barleycorn Must Die	England
24 July 1970	Yes	Time and a Word	United Kingdom
7 August 1970	The Moody Blues	A Question of Balance	England
10 August 1970	The Mothers of Invention	Weasels Ripped My Flesh	US
August 1970	Supertramp	Supertramp	England
4 September 1970	Caravan	If I Could Do It All Over Again, I'd Do It All Over You	United Kingdom
September 1970	Focus	Focus Plays Focus (In and Out of Focus)	Netherlands
September 1970	Rare Bird	As Your Mind Flies By	United Kingdom
2 October 1970	Pink Floyd	Atom Heart Mother	United Kingdom
23 October 1970	Genesis	Trespass	United Kingdom
23 October 1970	Frank Zappa	Chunga's Revenge	US
November 1970	Syd Barrett	Barrett	United Kingdom
20 November 1970	Emerson, Lake & Palmer	Emerson, Lake & Palmer	England
27 November 1970	Gentle Giant	Gentle Giant	United Kingdom
November 1970	Curved Air	Airconditioning	United Kingdom
November 1970	Family	Anyway	United Kingdom
November 1970	McDonald & Giles	McDonald & Giles	United Kingdom
November 1970	Wigwam	Tombstone Valentine	Finland
November 1970	Colosseum	Daughter of Time	England
11 December 1970	King Crimson	Lizard	United Kingdom
December 1970	Van der Graaf Generator	H to He, Who Am the Only One	United Kingdom
December 1970	Bo Hansson	Sagan Om Ringen	Sweden
1970	Aardvark	Aardvark	United Kingdom
1970	Almendra (band)	Almendra II	Argentina
1970	Association	Earwax	Germany
1970	Beggars Opera	Act One	United Kingdom
1970	Cressida	Cressida	United Kingdom
1970	Wolfgang Dauner	Output	Germany
1970	Goliath	Goliath	England
1970	Gomorrha	Trauma	Germany
1970	Gracious!	Gracious!	England
1970	Marsupilami	S / T	U.K.
1970	Moving Gelatine Plates	Moving Gelatine Plates	France
1970	Catherine Ribeiro + Alpes	N° 2	France
1970	Bob Smith	The Visit	USA
1970	Supersister	Present from Nancy	Netherlands
1970	T2	It'll All Work Out in Boomland	United Kingdom
1970	Walrus	Walrus	United Kingdom

=== Disbandments ===
- The Beatles
- Dogovor iz 1804.
- The Nice
- Organisation
- Quill
- Sam Gopal

=== Events ===
- Peter Banks leaves Yes, being replaced by former Bodast and Tomorrow guitarist Steve Howe.
- Anthony Phillips leaves Genesis, and is replaced by guitarist Steve Hackett. Genesis also changes drummers, losing John Mayhew and bringing in former child actor Phil Collins.
- Jan Akkerman and Pierre van der Linden leave Brainbox for Focus.

== 1971 ==
=== Newly formed bands ===
- Camel
- Druid
- Fields
- Harmonium
- Manfred Mann's Earth Band
- Matching Mole
- Queen
- Styx
- Time

=== Albums ===
Release Date	Artist	Album	Country
1971 Jan	Uriah Heep	Salisbury	England
1971 Jan	Mogul Thrash	Mogul Thrash	England
5 February 1971	Barclay James Harvest	Once Again	England
19 February 1971	Yes	The Yes Album	England
1971 Feb	Soft Machine	Fourth	England
1971 Feb	Egg	The Polite Force	United Kingdom
19 March 1971	Jethro Tull	Aqualung	England
1971 Mar	Amon Düül II	Tanz der Lemminge	Germany
1971 Mar	Nucleus	We'll Talk About it Later	England
8 April 1971	Caravan	In the Land of Grey and Pink	England
1971 May	Jade Warrior	Jade Warrior	England
4 June 1971	Emerson, Lake & Palmer	Tarkus	England
11 June 1971	Procol Harum	Broken Barricades	England
25 June 1971	Supertramp	Indelibly Stamped	England
1971 Jun	Ash Ra Tempel	Ash Ra Tempel	Germany
16 July 1971	Gentle Giant	Acquiring the Taste	England
23 July 1971	The Moody Blues	Every Good Boy Deserves Favour	England
1971 Jul	Strawbs	From the Witchwood	England
2 August 1971	The Mothers	Fillmore East – June 1971	US
1971 Aug	Can	Tago Mago	Germany
30 August 1971	The Beach Boys	Surf's Up	US
1971 Sep	Curved Air	Second Album	United Kingdom
1971 Sep	Spirogyra	St. Radigund's	England
4 October 1971	Frank Zappa	200 Motels	US
5 October	Magma	1001º Centigrades	France
8 October 1971	Hawkwind	In Search of Space	England
29 October 1971	Family	Fearless	United Kingdom
1971 Oct	Focus	Focus II (aka Moving Waves)	Netherlands
1971 Oct	Earth and Fire	Song of the Marching Children	Netherlands
1971 Oct	Gong	Camembert Electrique	England/France
1971 Oct	Centipede	Septober Energy	England
3 November 1971	Mahavishnu Orchestra	The Inner Mounting Flame	USA
5 November 1971	Pink Floyd	Meddle	England
5 November 1971	Barclay James Harvest	Barclay James Harvest and Other Short Stories	England
8 November 1971	Led Zeppelin	IV	England
12 November 1971	Genesis	Nursery Cryme	England
12 November 1971	Van der Graaf Generator	Pawn Hearts	England
12 November 1971	Yes	Fragile	England
1971 Nov	Emerson, Lake & Palmer	Pictures at an Exhibition	England
1971 Nov	Fields	Fields	England
1971 Nov	Traffic	The Low Spark of the High Heeled Boys	England
1971 Nov	Beggars Opera	Waters of Change	Scotland
3 December 1971	Electric Light Orchestra	The Electric Light Orchestra	UK only
3 December 1971	King Crimson	Islands	England
1971 Dec	Wigwam	Fairyport	Finland
1971	Jade Warrior	Released	England
1971	Comus	First Utterance	England
1971	Cressida	Asylum	England
1971	Delirium	Dolce acqua	Italy
1971	Faust	Faust	Germany
1971	Mort Garson	Black Mass/Lucifer	Canada
1971	Heaven	Brass Rock 1	United Kingdom
1971	Ikarus	Ikarus	Germany
1971	Arthur Brown's Kingdom Come	Galactic Zoo Dossier	England
1971	Le Orme	Collage	Italy
1971	Los Jaivas	El Volantín	Chile
1971	Marsupilami	Arena	UK
1971	McChurch Soundroom	Delusion	Germany
1971	Moving Gelatine Plates	The World of Genius Hans	France
1971	Osanna	L'uomo	Italy
1971	Out Of Focus	S / T	Germany
1971	Panna Fredda	Uno	Italy
1971	Renaissance	Illusion	England
1971	Catherine Ribeiro + Alpes	Ame Debout	France
1971	Luis Alberto Spinetta	Spinettalandia y sus amigos	Argentina
1971	Spring	Spring	England
1971	Sunbirds	S / T	Germany
1971	Supersister	To the Highe$t Bidder	Netherlands
1971	Rufus Zuphall	Phallobst	Germany
1971	Vox Dei	La Biblia	Argentina

=== Disbandments ===
- Nirvana (British band)
- Quatermass

=== Events ===
- The new King Crimson that Bill Bruford joins has former Family bassist John Wetton.
- Yes fires organist Tony Kaye, and replaces him with former Strawbs keyboard player and session musician Rick Wakeman.

== 1972 ==
=== Newly formed bands ===
- Progresiv TM
- DAG
- Dah
- Gilgamesh
- Goblin
- Greenslade
- Gryphon
- Hatfield and the North
- Hobo
- Kayak
- Oko
- Pop Mašina
- S Vremena Na Vreme
- Tabula Rasa

=== Albums ===
Release Date	Artist	Album	Country
1972 Jan	Premiata Forneria Marconi	Storia di un minuto	Italy
1972 Jan	Kevin Ayers	Whatevershebringswesing	England
1972 Jan	Neu!	Neu!	Germany
1972 Feb	Strawbs	Grave New World	England
18 February 1972	Manfred Mann's Earth Band	Manfred Mann's Earth Band	United Kingdom
3 March 1972	Jethro Tull	Thick as a Brick	England
14 April 1972	Gentle Giant	Three Friends	England
1972 Apr	Matching Mole	Matching Mole	England
1972 Apr	Curved Air	Phantasmagoria	United Kingdom
1972 Apr	Cluster	Cluster II	Germany
1972 Apr	Guru Guru	Kanguru	Germany
1 May 1972	Weather Report	Live in Tokyo	USA
3 May 1972	Banco del Mutuo Soccorso	Banco del Mutuo Soccorso	Italy
19 May 1972	Caravan	Waterloo Lily	England
19 May 1972	Uriah Heep	Demons and Wizards	England
25 May 1972	Il Balletto di Bronzo	Ys	Italy
26 May 1972	Weather Report	I Sing the Body electric	USA
1972 May	Herbie Hancock	Crossings	USA
1972 May	Kraan	Kraan	Germany
2 June 1972	Khan	Space Shanti	England
2 June 1972	Pink Floyd	Obscured by Clouds	England
23 June 1972	Jethro Tull	Living in the Past	England
23 June 1972	Emerson, Lake & Palmer	Trilogy	England
June 1972	Aphrodite's Child	666	Greece
June 1972	Supersister	Pudding En Gisteren [Aka: Pudding & Yesterday]	Netherlands
5 July 1972	Frank Zappa	Waka/Jawaka	US
1972 July	Soft Machine	Fifth	England
1972 August	Tangerine Dream	Zeit	Germany
1972 August	Korni Grupa	Korni Grupa (PRG RTB, Belgrade; runout 16 07 72 )	Yugoslavia
1972 August	Time	Time	Yugoslavia
8 September 1972	Yes	Close to the Edge	England
15 September 1972	Genesis	Foxtrot	England
29 September 1972	Manfred Mann's Earth Band	Glorified Magnified	United Kingdom
1972 Sep	Bo Hansson	Music Inspired by Lord of the Rings	Sweden
1972 Sep	Family	Bandstand	United Kingdom
1972 Sep	Chick Corea	Return to Forever	USA
11 October 1972	Santana	Caravanserai	USA
11 October 1972	Miles Davis	On the Corner	USA
23 October 1972	The Moody Blues	Seventh Sojourn	England
1972 Oct	Renaissance	Prologue	England
1972 Oct	Tasavallan Presidentti	Lambertland	Finland
27 November 1972	Frank Zappa and the Mothers	The Grand Wazoo	USA
1972 Nov	Focus	Focus 3	Netherlands
1972 Nov	Hawkwind	Doremi Fasol Latido	England
1972 Nov	Premiata Forneria Marconi	Per un amico	Italy
1972 Nov	Nektar	A Tab in the Ocean	England/Germany
1972 Nov	Matching Mole	Matching Mole's Little Red Record	England
1 December 1972	Gentle Giant	Octopus	England
1972 Dec	The Mothers	The Grand Wazoo	US
1972 Dec	Banco del Mutuo Soccorso	Darwin!	Italy
1972	Agitation Free	Malesch	Germany
1972	Aquelarre (band)	Aquelarre	Argentina
1972	Älgarnas Trädgård	Framtiden Är Ett Svävande Skepp, Förankrat I Forntiden	Sweden
1972	Alma y Vida	Volumen II	Argentina
1972	Ange	Caricatures	France
1972	Arco Iris	Sudamérica o el regreso de la aurora	Argentina
1972	Arco Iris	Tiempo de Resurrección	Argentina
1972	Ash Ra Tempel	Schwingungen	Germany
1972	Barclay James Harvest	Baby James Harvest	England
1972	Franco Battiato	Pollution	Italy
1972	Beggars Opera	Pathfinder	England
1972	Brainbox	Parts	Netherlands
1972	Can	Ege Bamyasi	Germany
1972	Color Humano	Volumen I	Argentina
1972	Delirium	Lo scemo e il villaggio	Italy
1972	Elonkorjuu	Harvest Time	Finland
1972	Flash	Flash	England
1972	Flash	In the Can	England
1972	Gracious!	This is...Gracious!!	England
1972	Jane	Together	Germany
1972	Korni Grupa	Korni Grupa	Yugoslavia
1972	Le Orme	Uomo di pezza	Italy
1972	Los Jaivas	Todos Juntos	Chile
1972	Moving Gelatine Plates	The World Of Genius Hans	France
1972	Osanna	Preludio Tema Variazioni e Canzona	Italy
1972	Pescado Rabioso	Desatormentándonos	Argentina
1972	Pekka Pohjola	Pihkasilmä kaarnakorva	Finland
1972	Raúl Prochetto	Cristo Rock	Argentina
1972	Catherine Ribeiro + Alpes	Paix	France
1972	Sui Generis	Vida	Argentina
1972	Supersister	Pudding en Gisteren	Netherlands

=== Disbandments ===
- Brainbox
- Fields
- Khan
- Matching Mole
- Van der Graaf Generator

== 1973 ==
=== Newly formed bands ===
- Clearlight
- Etron Fou Leloublan
- Happy the Man
- Journey
- Opus
- Refugee
- Tempest
- Klaatu
- Kansas

=== Albums ===
Release Date	Artist	Album	Country
19 January 1973	Mahavishnu Orchestra	Birds of Fire	US
23 January 1973	Rick Wakeman	The Six Wives of Henry VIII	England
1973 Jan	Return to Forever	Light as a Feather	US
1973 Feb	Brian Eno	Here Come The Warm Jets	England
1973 Feb	Camel	Camel	England
1973 Feb	Soft Machine	Six	England
1973 Feb	Traffic	Shoot Out at the Fantasy Factory	England
1973 Feb	Greenslade	Greenslade	England
1 March 1973	Pink Floyd	The Dark Side of the Moon	England
March 1973	Electric Light Orchestra	ELO 2 (UK) / Electric Light Orchestra II (US)	England
23 March 1973	King Crimson	Larks' Tongues in Aspic	England
23 March 1973	Roxy Music	For Your Pleasure	England
1973 Mar	Procol Harum	Grand Hotel	England
1973 Mar	Peter Sienfield	Still	England
27 April 1973	Weather Report	Sweetnighter	US
1973 Apr	Curved Air	Air Cut	United Kingdom
1973 Apr	Museo Rosenbach	Zarathustra	Italy
1973 Apr	Steeleye Span	Parcel of Rogues	England
1973 Apr	Sand	Sand	US
4 May 1973	Yes	Yessongs	England
6 May 1973	Magma	Mekanik Destruktiw Kommandoh	France
11 May 1973	Hawkwind	Space Ritual	England
25 May 1973	Gong	Flying Teapot	England/France
25 May 1973	Mike Oldfield	Tubular Bells	England
1 June 1973	Gryphon	Gryphon	England
15 June 1973	Manfred Mann's Earth Band	Messin'	United Kingdom
13 July 1973	Jethro Tull	A Passion Play	England
13 July 1973	Queen	Queen	England
20 July 1973	Genesis	Genesis Live	England
31 Aug 1973	Henry Cow	The Henry Cow Legend	England
7 September 1973	Frank Zappa & The Mothers	Over-Nite Sensation	US
21 September 1973	Gentle Giant	In a Glass House	England
1973 Sep	Family	It's Only a Movie	United Kingdom
1 October 1973	Billy Cobham	Spectrum	US
5 October 1973	Genesis	Selling England by the Pound	England
5 October 1973	Caravan	For Girls Who Grow Plump in the Night	England
26 October 1973	The Who	Quadrophenia	England
1973 Oct	Renaissance	Ashes Are Burning	England
1973 Oct	Return to Forever	Hymn of the Seventh Galaxy	US
1973 Oct	Premiata Forneria Marconi	Photos of Ghosts	Italy
1973 Nov	Brian Eno & Robert Fripp	No Pussyfooting	England
1973 Nov	Electric Light Orchestra	On The Third Day	England
1973 Nov	Fusion Orchestra	Skeleton In Armour	England
1973 Nov	Roxy Music	Stranded	England
1973 Nov	Nektar	Remember the Future	England
30 November 1973	Black Sabbath	Sabbath Bloody Sabbath	England
30 November 1973	Manfred Mann's Earth Band	Solar Fire	United Kingdom
7 December 1973	Yes	Tales from Topographic Oceans	England
7 December 1973	Emerson, Lake & Palmer	Brain Salad Surgery	England
7 December 1973	Gong	Angel's Egg	Various
15 December 1973	Petrus Castrus	Mestre	Portugal
1973 Dec	Supersister	Iskander	Netherlands
1973 December	Banco del Mutuo Soccorso	Io sono nato libero	Italy
1973	Acqua Fragile	Acqua Fragile	Italy
1973	Aquelarre (band)	Candiles	Argentina
1973	Alma y Vida	Del gemido de un gorrión	Argentina
1973	Ange	Le Cimetière des arlequins	France
1973	Arco Iris (band)	Inti Rayni	Argentina
1973	Area	Arbeit Macht Frei	Italy
1973	Badger	One Live Badger	England
1973	Beggars Opera	Get Your Dog Off Me!	England
1973	Cannabis India	SWF Session	Germany
1973	Cervello	Melos	Italy
1973	Color Humano	Volumen II	Argentina
1973	De De Lind	Io non so da dove vengo e non so dove mai andrò. Uomo è il nome che mi han dato	Italy
1973	Embryo	Steig Aus	Germany
1973	Eneide	Uomini umili popoli liberi	Italy
1973	Flash	Out of our Hands	England
1973	Gorrión (band)	El rock de la Misa Criolla	Argentina
1973	Kayak	See See The Sun	Netherlands
1973	Krokodil	Sweat & Swim	Switzerland
1973	Le Orme	Felona e Sorona	Italy
1973	Los Jaivas	Palomita Blanca	Chile
1973	Osanna	Palepoli	Italy
1973	Pescado Rabioso	Pescado 2	Argentina
1973	Pholas Dactylus	Concerto delle menti	Italy
1973	Pinchevsky y La Pesada	Violín Mágico	Argentina
1973	Pop Mašina	Kiselina	Yugoslavia
1973	Saint Just	Saint Just	Italy
1973	Luis Alberto Spinetta	Artaud	Argentina
1973	Samla Mammas Manna	Måltid	Sweden
1973	Semiramis	Dedicato a Frazz	Italy
1973	Sui Generis	Confesiones de Invierno	Argentina
1973	Cyrille Verdeaux	Clearlight Symphony	France
1973	YU Grupa	YU Grupa	Yugoslavia

=== Disbandments ===
- Jackson Heights
- Marsupilami

=== Events ===
- Rick Wakeman leaves Yes after concluding the band's Tales From Topographic Oceans Tour. He would enjoy a long solo career following the success of his albums Six Wives of Henry VIII and Journey to the Center of the Earth. He is replaced by former Refugee keyboard player Patrick Moraz.
- Founding member Phil Schulman leaves Gentle Giant.

== 1974 ==
=== Newly formed bands ===
- Bijelo Dugme
- Drugi Način
- SBB
- Tako
- Teška Industrija
- Trace
- Univers Zero

=== Albums ===
Release Date	Artist	Album	Country
20 February 1974	Tangerine Dream	Phaedra	Germany
1974 Feb	Wigwam	Being	Finland
1 March 1974	Camel	Mirage	England
1974 Mar	Hatfield & the North	Hatfield & the North	England
1974 Mar	Refugee	Refugee	England
8 March 1974	Queen	Queen II	England
8 March 1974	Kansas	Kansas	US
18 March 1974	Rush	Rush	Canada
22 March 1974	Frank Zappa	Apostrophe (')	US
29 March 1974	King Crimson	Starless and Bible Black	England
1974 Mar	Strawbs	Hero and Heroine	England
19 April 1974	Caravan	Caravan and the New Symphonia	England
1974 Apr	Gryphon	Midnight Mushrumps	England
1974 Apr	Procol Harum	Exotic Birds and Fruit	England
3 May 1974	Rick Wakeman	Journey to the Center of the Earth	England
27 May 1974	Henry Cow	Unrest	England
1974 May	Focus	Hamburger Concerto	Netherlands
14 June 1974	Barclay James Harvest	Everyone Is Everybody Else	England
Jul 1974	Renaissance	Turn of the Cards	England
26 July 1974	Robert Wyatt	Rock Bottom	England
30 Aug 1974	Mike Oldfield	Hergest Ridge	England
6 Sept 1974	Hawkwind	Hall of the Mountain Grill	England
9 Sept 1974	Trace	Trace	Netherlands
10 Sept 1974	Frank Zappa & The Mothers	Roxy & Elsewhere	US
19 Sept 1974	Magma	Kohntarkosz	France
1974 Sep	Electric Light Orchestra	Eldorado	England
1974 Sep	Gentle Giant	The Power and the Glory	England
1974 Sep	Todd Rundgren's Utopia	Utopia	US
1974 Sep	The Neutrons	Black Hole Star	England
1974 Sep	Secret Oyster	Sea Son	Denmark
1974 Sep	Sensations' Fix	Portable Madness	Italy
1974 Sep	Franco Battiato	Clic	Italy
4 October 1974	Gong	You	Various
11 October 1974	Manfred Mann's Earth Band	The Good Earth	United Kingdom
1974 Oct	King Crimson	Red	England
14 October 1974	Jethro Tull	Warchild	England
21 October 1974	Acqua Fragile	Mass Media Stars	Italy
25 October 1974	Supertramp	Crime of the Century	England
1974 Oct	Fred Frith	Guitar Solos	England
November 1974	Brian Eno	Taking Tiger Mountain (By Strategy)	England
1974 Nov	Kraftwerk	Autobahn	Germany
8 November 1974	Queen	Sheer Heart Attack	England
18 November 1974	Bijelo Dugme	Kad bi bio bijelo dugme	Yugoslavia
22 November 1974	Genesis	The Lamb Lies Down on Broadway	England
29 November 1974	Yes	Relayer	England
16 December 1974	Sui Generis	Pequeñas anécdotas sobre las instituciones	Argentina
December 1974	Gryphon	Red Queen to Gryphon Three	England
1974 Dec	Heldon	Electronique Guerilla	France
1974 Dec	Zao	Osiris	France
1974 Dec	Isotope	Illusion	England
1974	Aquelarre (band)	Brumas	Argentina
1974	Alma y Vida	Volumen IV	Argentina
1974	Alusa Fallax	Intorno alla mia cattiva educazione	Italy
1974	Ange	Au-delà du délire	France
1974	Area	Caution Radiation Area	Italy
1974	Arti + Mestieri	Tilt	Italy
1974	Badger	White Lady	England
1974	Beggars Opera	Sagitarry	England
1974	Biglietto per l'Inferno	Biglietto per l'Inferno	Italy
1974	Color Humano	Volumen 3	Argentina
1974	Cluster	Zuckerzeit	Germany
1974	The Cosmic Jokers	Galactic Supermarket	Germany
1974	DAG	Sećanja	Yugoslavia
1974	Dah	Veliki cirkus	Yugoslavia
1974	Delirium	III	Italy
1974	Edgar Allan Poe	Generazioni - Una storia di sempre	Italy
1974	León Gieco	La banda de los caballos cansados	Argentina
1974	Kayak	Kayak II	Netherlands
1974	Invisible (band)	Invisible (album)	Argentina
1974	Korni Grupa	Not an Ordinary Life	Yugoslavia
1974	Le Orme	Contrappunti	Italy
1974	Los Canarios	Ciclos	Spain
1974	Los Jaivas/Manduka	Los Sueños De América	Chile
1974	Metamorfosi	Inferno	Italy
1974	Pekka Pohjola	Harakka Bialoipokku (B The Magpie)	Finland
1974	Porodična Manufaktura Crnog Hleba	Stvaranaje	Yugoslavia
1974	Premiata Forneria Marconi	L'isola di niente	Italy
1974	Catherine Ribeiro + Alpes	Le Rat Débile Et L'Homme Des Champs	France
1974	Saint Just	La casa del lago	Italy
1974	Samla Mammas Manna	Klossa Knapitatet	Sweden
1974	Sweet Okay Supersister	Spiral Staircase	Netherlands
1974	Triumvirat	Illusions on a Double Dimple	Germany
1974	YU Grupa	Kako to da svaki dan?	Yugoslavia

=== Disbandments ===
- King Crimson
- Korni Grupa
- Refugee
- Supersister

=== Events ===
- John Rutsey leaves Rush to be replaced by Neil Peart.

== 1975 ==
=== Newly formed bands ===
- Ambrosia
- Buldožer
- National Health
- September
- Triana

=== Reformed bands ===
- Van Der Graaf Generator

=== Albums ===
Release Date	Artist	Album	Country
Jan 1975	Klaus Schulze	Picture Music	Germany
14 Feb 1975	Rush	Fly by Night	Canada
Feb 1975	Kansas	Song for America	US
Feb 1975	Maneige	Maneige	Canada
07 Mar 1975	Hatfield and the North	The Rotter's Club	England
Mar 1975	Soft Machine	Bundles	England
21 Mar 1975	Tangerine Dream	Rubycon	Germany
27 Mar 1975	Rick Wakeman	The Myths and Legends of King Arthur and the Knights of the Round Table	England
11 April 1975	Steve Hillage	Fish Rising	England
14 April 1975	Triana	El Patio	Spain
15 April 1975	Harmonium	Les cinq saisons	Canada
25 April 1975	Camel	The Snow Goose	England
09 May 1975	Hawkwind	Warrior on the Edge of Time	England
09 May 1975	Henry Cow	In Praise of Learning	England
25 Jun 1975	Frank Zappa & The Mothers of Invention	One Size Fits All	US
25 July 1975	Caravan	Cunning Stunts	England
1975 Jul	Renaissance	Scheherazade and Other Stories	England
1975 Jul	Trace	Birds	Netherlands
1975 Aug	Gentle Giant	Free Hand	England
22 Aug 1975	Manfred Mann's Earth Band	Nightingales & Bombers	United Kingdom
Aug 1975	Klaus Schulze	Timewind	Germany
Aug 1975	Area	Crac!	Italy
1975 Sept	Electric Light Orchestra	Face The Music	England
5 Sept 1975	Jethro Tull	Minstrel in the Gallery	England
12 Sept 1975	Pink Floyd	Wish You Were Here	England
1975 Sept	Kansas	Masque	US
24 Sept 1975	Rush	Caress of Steel	Canada
1975 Sept	Procol Harum	Procol's Ninth	England
2 Oct 1975	Frank Zappa & The Mothers w/ Captain Beefheart	Bongo Fury	US
1975 Oct	Quiet Sun	Mainstream	England
1975 Oct	Barclay James Harvest	Time Honoured Ghosts	England
1975 Oct	Steve Hackett	Voyage of the Acolyte	England
1975 Oct	Van der Graaf Generator	Godbluff	England
31 Oct 1975	Steve Howe	Beginnings	England
7 November 1975	Mike Oldfield	Ommadawn	England
14 November 1975	Brian Eno	Another Green World	England
17 Nov 1975	Maneige	Les Porches	Canada
21 Nov 1975	Chris Squire	Fish Out of Water	England
28 Nov 1975	Queen	A Night at the Opera	England
28 Nov 1975	Supertramp	Crisis? What Crisis?	England
17 Dec 1975	Bijelo Dugme	Šta bi dao da si na mom mjestu	Yugoslavia
Dec 1975	Brian Eno & Robert Fripp	Evening Star	England
Dec 1975	Brian Eno	Discreet Music	England
Dec 1975	Sloche	J'Un Oeil	Canada
1975	Ambrosia	Ambrosia	US
1975	Aquelarre	Siesta	Argentina
1975	Ange	Émile Jacotey	France
1975	Apoteosi	Apoteosi	Italy
1975	Banda do Casaco	Dos Benefícios dum Vendido no Reino dos Bonifácios	Portugal
1975	Beggars Opera	Beggars Can't Be Choosers	England
1975	Buldožer	Pljuni istini u oči	Yugoslavia
1975	Carpe Diem	En Regardant Passer Le Temps	France
1975	Clearlight	Forever Blowing Bubbles	France
1975	Curved Air	Midnight Wire	United Kingdom
1975	Druid	Toward the Sun	England
1975	Espíritu	Crisálida	Argentina
1975	Fusioon	Minorisa	Spain
1975	Goblin	Profondo Rosso	Italy
1975	Gryphon	Raindance	England
1975	Hobo	Hobo	Yugoslavia
1975	Invisible	Durazno Sangrando	Argentina
1975	Kaipa	Kaipa	Sweden
1975	Kayak	Royal Bed Bouncer	Netherlands
1975	Drugi Način	Drugi Način	Yugoslavia
1975	Magma	Live/Hhaï	France
1975	Maxophone	Maxophone	Italy
1975	Modrý Efekt	Modrý Efekt & Radim Hladik	Czechoslovakia
1975	The Muffins	Secret Signals II	US
1975	Opus	Opus 1	Yugoslavia
1975	Le Orme	Smogmagica	Italy
1975	Los Jaivas	El Indio	Chile
1975	Phoenix	Cantafabule	Romania
1975	Pop Mašina	Na izvoru svetlosti	Yugoslavia
1975	Premiata Forneria Marconi	Chocolate Kings	Italy
1975	SBB	Nowy Horyzont	Poland
1975	S Vremena Na Vreme	S Vremena Na Vreme	Yugoslavia
1975	Catherine Ribeiro + Alpes	Libertes	France
1975	O Terço	Criaturas da Noite	Brazil
1975	Time	Time II	Yugoslavia
1975	Triumvirat	Spartacus	Germany
1975	Wigwam	Nuclear Nightclub	Finland
1975	Yezda Urfa	Boris	US
1975	YU Grupa	YU Grupa	Yugoslavia

=== Disbandments ===
- DAG
- Hatfield and the North
- Fusion Orchestra disband in May after six years of touring. This had been the band's eighth line-up. Only drummer Dave Bell remained from the original band, formed in 1969. Co-founder Col Dawson had left at the end of December 1974.
- Porodična Manufaktura Crnog Hleba
- The Mothers of Invention

=== Events ===
- Vocalist Peter Gabriel leaves Genesis at the end of The Lamb Lies Down on Broadway tour. The band's drummer, Phil Collins, steps up to be lead singer and frontman after the band auditions some 450 singers. Gabriel then embarks on a solo career.
- Former Pink Floyd frontman, Syd Barrett, overweight and bald, goes to Abbey Road Studios to ask if he can rejoin the band, they turn him down. The visit caused the band much distress. The band were recording the backing vocals for "Shine On You Crazy Diamond", a song about Barrett's demise.
- Bassist Mario Mutis leaves Los Jaivas.
- Yugoslav band Dah moves to Belgium, where they change their name to Land.

== 1976 ==
=== Newly formed bands ===
- Begnagrad
- Brand X
- Igra Staklenih Perli
- The Alan Parsons Project

=== Albums ===
Release Date	Artist	Album	Country
1976 Feb	Starcastle	Starcastle	US
13 February 1976	Genesis	A Trick of the Tail	England
24 March 1976	Rush	2112	Canada
26 March 1976	Camel	Moonmadness	England
1976 Apr	The Alan Parsons Project	Tales of Mystery and Imagination	England
16 April 1976	Van der Graaf Generator	Still Life	England
16 April 1976	Klaus Schulze	Moondawn	Germany
23 April 1976	Caravan	Blind Dog at St. Dunstans	England
23 April 1976	Gentle Giant	Interview	England
23 April 1976	Jethro Tull	Too Old to Rock 'n' Roll: Too Young to Die!	England
18 June 1976	Brand X	Unorthodox Behaviour	England
1976 Jun	Soft Machine	Softs	England
1976 Jun	Patrick Moraz	The Story of I	Switzerland
9 July 1976	Jon Anderson	Olias of Sunhillow	England
27 August 1976	Manfred Mann's Earth Band	The Roaring Silence	United Kingdom
1976 Sep	Pulsar	The Strands of the Future	France
1 October 1976	Barclay James Harvest	Octoberon	England
15 October 1976	Electric Light Orchestra	A New World Record	England
20 October 1976	Frank Zappa	Zoot Allures	US
21 October 1976	Kansas	Leftoverture	US
October 1976	Tangerine Dream	Stratosfear	Germany
1976 Oct	Van der Graaf Generator	World Record	England
10 December 1976	Queen	A Day at the Races	England
17 December 1976	Genesis	Wind and Wuthering	England
20 December 1976	Bijelo Dugme	Eto! Baš hoću!	Yugoslavia
1976	Ambrosia	Somewhere I've Never Travelled	US
1976	Ange	Par les fils de Mandrin	France
1976	Art Zoyd	Symphonie Pour Le Jour Ou Bruleront Les Cités	France
1976	Banco del Mutuo Soccorso	Come in un'ultima cena	Italy
1976	Banco del Mutuo Soccorso	Garofano rosso	Italy
1976	Celeste	Celeste (also known as Principe di un giorno)	Italy
1976	Cos	Viva Boma	Belgium
1976	Henry Cow	Concerts	England
1976	Crucis	Crucis	Argentina
1976	Curved Air	Airborne	United Kingdom
1976	Dah	Povratak	Yugoslavia
1976	Druid	Fluid Druid	England
1976	Ethos	Ardour	US
1976	Far East Family Band	Parallel World	Japan
1976	Gualberto	Vericuetos	Spain
1976	Kaipa	Inget Nytt Under Solen	Sweden
1976	Kayak	The Last Encore	Netherlands
1976	Le Orme	Verità nascoste	Italy
1976	Mythos	Superkraut: Live at Stagge's Hotel 1976	Germany
1976	Novalis	Sommerabend	Germany
1976	Oko	Raskorak	Yugoslavia
1976	Picchio dal Pozzo	Picchio dal Pozzo	Italy
1976	Pollen	Pollen	Canada
1976	Pop Mašina	Put ka Suncu	Yugoslavia
1976	Goblin	Roller	Italy
1976	Popol Vuh	Letzte Tage - Letzte Nächte	Germany
1976	Schicke Führs & Fröhling	Symphonic Pictures	Germany
1976	September	Zadnja avanntura	Yugoslavia
1976	Teška Industrija	Ho ruk	Yugoslavia
1976	Teška Industrija	Teška Industrija	Yugoslavia
1976	Time	Život u čizmama sa visokom petom	Yugoslavia
1976	Trace	The White Ladies	Netherlands

=== Disbandments ===
- 10cc: Kevin Godley and Lol Creme leave to pursue solo projects.
- Curved Air
- Dah
- Deep Purple
- Grupa Marina Škrgatića
- Nirvana (Yugoslav band)

== 1977 ==
=== Newly formed bands ===
- Aksak Maboul
- Cardiacs
- Crack
- Galija
- Gordi
- Predmestje
- Saga
- Témpano
- Toto
- U.K.

=== Albums ===
Release Date	Artist	Album	Country
21 January 1977	Pink Floyd	Animals	England
1977 Jan	Renaissance	Novella	England
4 February 1977	Utopia	Ra	US
11 February 1977	Jethro Tull	Songs from the Wood	England
25 February 1977	Peter Gabriel	Peter Gabriel I	England
25 February 1977	Procol Harum	Something Magic	England
25 March 1977	Emerson, Lake & Palmer	Works Volume 1	England
1977 Mar	John Greaves & Peter Blegvad	Kew. Rhone.	England
1977 Mar	Anthony Phillips	The Geese and the Ghost	England
1977 Apr	Brand X	Moroccan Roll	England
8 April 1977	Supertramp	Even in the Quietest Moments...	England
27 May 1977	Dixie Dregs	Freefall	US
1977 Jun	Hawkwind	Quark, Strangeness and Charm	England
7 July 1977	Styx	The Grand Illusion	US
8 July 1977	The Alan Parsons Project	I, Robot	England
12 July 1977	Yes	Going for the One	England
1977 Jul	Caravan	Better by Far	England
26 August 1977	Camel	Rain Dances	England
26 August 1977	Gentle Giant	The Missing Piece	England
29 August 1977	Rush	A Farewell to Kings	Canada
2 September 1977	Van der Graaf	The Quiet Zone/The Pleasure Dome	England
1977 Sep	Barclay James Harvest	Gone to Earth	England
1977 Oct	Kansas	Point of Know Return	US
14 October 1977	Genesis	Seconds Out (Live)	England
24 October 1977	Electric Light Orchestra	Out Of The Blue	England
28 October 1977	Queen	News of the World	England
25 November 1977	Emerson, Lake & Palmer	Works Volume 2	England
31 December 1977	Bijelo Dugme	Koncert kod Hajdučke česme	Yugoslavia
1977	Ange	Tome VI : Live 1977	France
1977	Ange	En concert : Live 1970-1971	France
1977	Aksak Maboul	Onze Danses Pour Combattre la Migraine	Belgium
1977	Mike Batt	Schizophonia	England
1977	Buldožer	Zabranjeno plakatirati	Yugoslavia
1977	Eric Burdon	Survivor	England
1977	Goblin	Suspiria	Italy
1977	Circus	Movin' On	Switzerland
1977	Eloy	Ocean	Germany
1977	England	Garden Shed	England
1977	Brian Eno	Before and After Science	England
1977	Godley and Creme	Consequences	England
1977	Gong	Gazeuse! (also known as Expresso)	Various
1977	Grobschnitt	Rockpommel's Land	Germany
1977	Gryphon	Treason	England
1977	Happy the Man	Happy the Man	US
1977	Heldon	Interface	France
1977	Island	Pictures	Switzerland
1977	Kaamos	Deeds and Talks	Finland
1977	Kayak	Starlight Dancer	Netherlands
1977	Locanda delle Fate	Forse le lucciole non si amano piu	Italy
1977	Los Jaivas	Canción del Sur	Chile
1977	Maneige	Ni Vent... Ni Nouvelle	Canada
1977	Modrý Efekt	Svitanie	Czechoslovakia
1977	Mona Lisa	Le Petit Violon de Mr. Gregoire	France
1977	Pentwater	Pentwater	US
1977	Pierrot Lunaire	Gudrun	Italy
1977	Pekka Pohjola	The Mathematician's Air Display (Keesojen lehto)	Finland
1977	Predmestje	Brez naslov	Yugoslavia
1977	Premiata Forneria Marconi	Jet Lag	Italy
1977	Pulsar	Halloween	France
1977	Catherine Ribeiro + Alpes	Le Temps De L'Autre	France
1977	Schicke Führs & Fröhling	Sunburst	Germany
1977	Triana	Hijos del Agobio	Spain
1977	Univers Zero	Univers Zero (also known as 1313)	Belgium
1977	YU Grupa	Među zvezdama	Yugoslavia

=== Disbandments ===
- Hobo
- Time

=== Events ===
- Abortive supergroup British Bulldog with John Wetton, Rick Wakeman and Bill Bruford only play a few rehearsals.
- Patrick Moraz is fired from Yes to allow Rick Wakeman to re-join.
- Guitarist Steve Hackett departs Genesis to pursue solo work.

== 1978 ==
=== Newly formed bands ===
- Aerodrom
- Art Bears
- Den Za Den
- Iman Califato Independiente
- Na Lepem Prijazni
- Sky
- Twelfth Night

=== Albums ===
Release Date	Artist	Album	Country
6 January 1978	Bill Bruford	Feels Good to Me	England
24 February 1978	Manfred Mann's Earth Band	Watch	United Kingdom
February 1978	Tangerine Dream	Cyclone	Germany
3 March 1978	Renaissance	A Song for All Seasons	England
3 March 1978	Pierre Moerlen's Gong	Expresso II	Various
3 March 1978	Frank Zappa	Zappa in New York	US
1978 Mar	Dixie Dregs	What If	US
31 March 1978	Genesis	...And Then There Were Three...	England
8 April 1978	Saga	Saga	Canada
10 April 1978	Jethro Tull	Heavy Horses	England
14 April 1978	U.K.	U.K.	England
14 April 1978	Steve Hackett	Please Don't Touch	England
1978 April	After the Fire	Signs of Change	England
15 May 1978	José Cid	10,000 Anos Depois Entre Venus E Marte	Portugal
26 May 1978	David Gilmour	David Gilmour	England
1978 May	Art Bears	Hopes and Fears	England
1978 May	Anthony Phillips	Wise After the Event	England
2 June 1978	Peter Gabriel	Peter Gabriel II	England
9 June 1978	Jeff Wayne	Jeff Wayne's Musical Version of The War of the Worlds	US
15 September 1978	Rick Wright	Wet Dream	England
15 September 1978	Frank Zappa	Studio Tan	US
22 September 1978	Yes	Tormato	England
22 September 1978	Camel	Breathless	England
22 September 1978	Jethro Tull	Bursting Out	England
29 September 1978	Barclay James Harvest	XII	England
29 September 1978	Gentle Giant	Giant for a Day	England
24 October 1978	Rush	Hemispheres	Canada
10 November 1978	Queen	Jazz	England
17 November 1978	Emerson, Lake & Palmer	Love Beach	England
1 December 1978	Mike Oldfield	Incantations	England
December 1978	National Health	Of Queues and Cures	England
1978	Ange	Guet-apens	France
1978	Atila	Reviure	Spain
1978	Banco del Mutuo Soccorso	...di terra	Italy
1978	Željko Bebek	Skoro da smo isti	Yugoslavia
1978	Bubu	Anabelas	Argentina
1978	Cathedral	Stained Glass Stories	US
1978	Crack	Si Todo Hiciera Crack	Spain
1978	Goblin	Il Fantastico Viaggio del Bagarozzo Mark	Italy
1978	Elonkorjuu	Flying High, Running Fast	Finland
1978	Fermata	Huascarán	Czechoslovakia
1978	Flame Dream	Calatea	Switzerland
1978	FM	Black Noise	Canada
1978	Führs & Fröhling	Ammerland	Germany
1978	Godley and Creme	L	England
1978	Gordi	Čovek	Yugoslavia
1978	Grobschnitt	Solar Music Live	Germany
1978	Happy the Man	Crafty Hands	US
1978	Heldon	Stand By	France
1978	Henry Cow	Western Culture	England
1978	Steve Hillage	Green	England
1978	Iman Califato Independiente	Iman Califato Independiente	Spain
1978	Kaipa	Solo	Sweden
1978	Kayak	Phantom of the Night	Netherlands
1978	MIA	Cornonstipicum	Argentina
1978	The Muffins	Manna / Mirage	US
1978	Pentwater	Out of the Abyss	US
1978	Popol Vuh	Nosferatu	Germany
1978	Premiata Forneria Marconi	Passpartù	Italy
1978	Laza Ristovski & Ipe Ivandić	Stižemo	Yugoslavia
1976	September	Domovina moja	Yugoslavia
1978	Shylock	Ile De Fievre	France
1978	Tako	Tako	Yugoslavia
1978	Terpandre	Terpandre	France
1978	Weidorje	Weidorje	France

=== Disbandments ===
- Elonkorjuu
- Emerson, Lake & Palmer
- Henry Cow
- Oko
- Pop Mašina
- Teška Industrija
- Van der Graaf Generator

=== Events ===
- Rock in Opposition (RIO) is formed by Henry Cow, Stormy Six, Samla Mammas Manna, Univers Zero and Etron Fou Leloublan at the first RIO festival in London on 12 March. Art Zoyd, Art Bears and Aksak Maboul join RIO in December.

== 1979 ==
=== Newly formed bands ===
- Marillion
- The Mnemonist Orchestra (developed into Biota)

=== Albums ===
Release Date	Artist	Album	Country
19 January 1979	Frank Zappa	Sleep Dirt	US
February 1979	Tangerine Dream	Force Majeure	Germany
9 March 1979	Manfred Mann's Earth Band	Angel Station	United Kingdom
16 March 1979	Bijelo Dugme	Bitanga i princeza	Yugoslavia
16 March 1979	Supertramp	Breakfast in America	England
16 March 1979	U.K.	Danger Money	England
1979 Mar	Frank Zappa	Sheik Yerbouti	US
1979 Mar	Dixie Dregs	Night of the Living Dregs	US
1979 Apr	Anthony Phillips	Sides	England
1979 Apr	Robert Fripp	Exposure	England
4 May 1979	Sky	Sky	England / Australia
4 May 1979	Frank Zappa	Orchestral Favorites	US
11 May 1979	Steve Hackett	Spectral Mornings	England
1979 May	Renaissance	Azure d'Or	England
1979 May	Kansas	Monolith	US
1979 May	Saga	Images at Twilight	Canada
1 June 1979	Electric Light Orchestra	Discovery	England
1979 June/July	Crack	Si Todo Hiciera Crack	Spain
27 July 1979	Mike Oldfield	Exposed	England
14 September 1979	Jethro Tull	Stormwatch	England
17 September 1979	Frank Zappa	Joe's Garage (Act I)	US
5 October 1979	Camel	I Can See Your House From Here	England
12 October 1979	Tony Banks	A Curious Feeling	England
5 November 1979	Barclay James Harvest	Eyes of the Universe	England
1979 Nov	Steve Howe	The Steve Howe Album	England
19 November 1979	Frank Zappa	Joe's Garage (Act II & III)	US
23 November 1979	Mike Oldfield	Platinum	UK
30 November 1979	Pink Floyd	The Wall	England
1979	Aerodrom	Kad misli mi vrludaju	Yugoslavia
1979	Aksak Maboul	Un Peu de l'Âme des Bandits	Belgium
1979	Arachnoid	Arachnoid	France
1979	Art Bears	Winter Songs	England
1979	Art Zoyd	Musique Pour l'Odyssee	France
1979	Atlas	Blå Vardag	Sweden
1979	Mike Batt	Tarot Suite	England
1979	Bill Bruford	One of a Kind	England
1979	Buldožer	Živi bili pa vidjeli	Yugoslavia
1979	Eloy	Silent Cries and Mighty Echoes	Germany
1979	Eskaton	Four Visions	France
1979	Flame Dream	Elements	Switzerland
1979	FM	Surveillance	Canada
1979	Galija	Prva plovidba	Yugoslavia
1979	Godley and Creme	Freeze Frame	England
1979	Gordi	Gordi 2	Yugoslavia
1979	Grace	Grace	England
1979	Igra Staklenih Perli	Igra Staklenih Perli	Yugoslavia
1979	Itoiz	Ezekiel	Basque Country
1979	Korni Grupa	1941.	Yugoslavia
1979	Le Orme	Florian	Italy
1979	Ma Banlieue Flasque	Ma Banlieue Flasque	France
1979	Albert Marcoeur	Armes et Cycles	France
1979	Mezquita	Recuerdos de mi tierra	Spain
1979	Modrý Efekt	Svĕt Hledaců	Czechoslovakia
1979	Neuschwanstein	Battlement	Germany
1979	Pekka Pohjola	Visitation	Finland
1979	Predmestje	Danes, včeraj in...	Yugoslavia
1979	Catherine Ribeiro + Alpes	Passions	France
1979	Schicke Führs & Fröhling	Ticket To Everywhere	Germany
1979	Stormy Six	Macchina maccheronica	Italy
1979	Témpano	Atabal Yemal	Venezuela
1979	Laurent Thibault	Mais on ne Peut pas Rever Tout le Temps	France
1979	Triana	Sombra y Luz	Spain
1979	Univers Zero	Heresie	Belgium
1979	YU Grupa	Samo napred...	Yugoslavia
1979	Sfinx	Zalmoxe	Romania

=== Disbandments ===
- Opus
- September
- U.K.

=== Events ===
- Rick Wright of Pink Floyd is fired from the band by bassist Roger Waters. However he is allowed back on "The Wall" tour as a paid session musician.
- Jon Anderson and Rick Wakeman leave Yes. They were replaced by Trevor Horn and Geoff Downes of The Buggles respectively.
- Mario Mutis rejoined Los Jaivas.

== See also ==
- Timeline of progressive rock: other decades: 1960s – 1980s – 1990s – 2000s – 2010s – 2020s
- Timeline of progressive rock (Parent article)
- Progressive rock
- Canterbury Scene
- Symphonic rock
- Avant-rock
- Rock in Opposition
- Neo-prog
- Progressive metal
- Jazz fusion
