= Timeline of progressive rock (1980–1989) =

This is a timeline of artists, albums, and events in progressive rock and its subgenres. This article contains the timeline for the period 1980–1989.

== Contents ==
1980 - 1981 - 1982 - 1983 - 1984 - 1985 - 1986 - 1987 - 1988 - 1989

- See also
- Links and references

== 1980 ==
=== Albums ===
Release date	Artist	Album	Country
1980 Jan 14	Rush	Permanent Waves	Canada
1980 Feb 15	Bill Bruford	Gradually Going Tornado	England
1980 Feb 15	Mike Rutherford	Smallcreep's Day	England
1980 Mar 3	Gentle Giant	Civilian	England
1980 Mar 28	Genesis	Duke	England
1980 Apr 18	Sky	Sky 2	England / Australia
1980 Apr	Premiata Forneria Marconi	Suonare suonare	Italy
1980 May 30	Peter Gabriel	Peter Gabriel III	England
1980 Jun 13	Steve Hackett	Defector	England
1980 Jun	Cardiac Arrest	The Obvious Identity	England
1980 Aug 22	Yes	Drama	England
1980 Aug 29	Jethro Tull	A	England
1980 Aug	Peter Hammill	A Black Box	England
1980 Aug	Saga	Silent Knight	Canada
1980 Sep	Kansas	Audio-Visions	US
1980 Sep	This Heat	This Heat	England
1980 Oct 17	Hawkwind	Levitation	England
1980 Oct 31	Mike Oldfield	QE2	England
1980 Oct 31	Caravan	The Album	England
1980 Nov 7	The Alan Parsons Project	The Turn of a Friendly Card	England
1980 Nov 7	Jon Anderson	Song of Seven	England
1980 Dec	Asia Minor	Between Flesh and Divine	France
1980	Abus Dangereux	Le Quatrieme Mouvement	France
1980	Ain Soph	A Story of Mysterious Forest	Japan
1980	Ange	Vu d'un Chien	France
1980	Art Bears	The World as It Is Today	England
1980	Art Zoyd	Generation Sans Futur	France
1980	Beggars Opera	Lifeline	England
1980	Buldožer	Izlog jeftinih slatkiša	Yugoslavia
1980	Cai	Noche Abierta	Spain
1980	Den Za Den	Den Za Den	Yugoslavia
1980	Eskaton	Ardeur	France
1980	Fred Frith	Gravity	England
1980	Galija	Druga plovidba	Yugoslavia
1980	Patrick Gauthier	Bebe Godzilla	France
1980	Igra Staklenih Perli	Vrt svetlosti	Yugoslavia
1980	Iman Califato Independiente	Camino del Aguila	Spain
1980	Jutro	Dobro jutro	Yugoslavia
1980	Kaipa	Händer	Sweden
1980	Kayak	Periscope Life	Netherlands
1980	The Muffins	Open City	US
1980	Picchio Dal Pozzo	Abbiamo Tutti I Suoi Problemi	Italy
1980	Pekka Pohjola	Kätkävaaran lohikäärme	Finland
1980	Predmestje	Hazard	Yugoslavia
1980	Present	Triskaidekaphobie	Belgium
1980	Rahmann	Rahmann	France
1980	Catherine Ribeiro + Alpes	La Deboussole	France
1980	SBB	Memento z banalnym tryptykiem	Poland
1980	Tako	U vreći za spavanje	Yugoslavia
1980	Wurtemberg	Rock Fantasia Opus 9	France
1980	Zamla Mammaz Manna	Familjesprickor	Sweden

=== Disbandments ===
- Den Za Den
- Gentle Giant
- Catherine Ribeiro + Alpes

=== Events ===
- Sky: Francis Monkman (keyboards) departs. Replaced by Steve Gray.
- Los Jaivas presents Obras de Violeta Parra for the first time in France.
- Former Pop Mašina members form hard rock band Rok Mašina.
- Aerodrom joins Yugoslav new wave scene with the album Tango Bango.

== 1981 ==
=== Newly formed bands ===
- Celelalte Cuvinte
- Asia
- Queensrÿche

=== Reformed bands ===
- King Crimson

=== Albums ===
Release date	Artist	Album	Country
1981 Jan 23	Camel	Nude	England
1981 Feb 12	Rush	Moving Pictures	Canada
1981 Feb	Premiata Forneria Marconi	Come ti va in riva alla città	Italy
1981 Feb	Twelfth Night	Live at the Target	England
1981 Mar 20	Sky	Sky 3	England / Australia
1981 May 11	Frank Zappa	Shut Up 'n Play Yer Guitar	US
1981 May 17	Frank Zappa	Tinseltown Rebellion	US
1981 June 5	Peter Hammill	Sitting Targets	England
1981 Jul 31	Electric Light Orchestra	Time	England
1981 Aug 21	Steve Hackett	Cured	England
1981 Sep 18	Genesis	Abacab	England
1981 Sep 23	Frank Zappa	You Are What You Is	US
1981 Sep	Saga	Worlds Apart	Canada
1981 Oct 2	King Crimson	Discipline	England
1981 Oct 2	Hawkwind	Sonic Attack	England
1981 Oct	Godley and Creme	Ismism	England
1981 Nov 10	Kiss	Music From “The Elder”	USA
1981	Ange	Moteur	France
1981	Barclay James Harvest	Turn of the Tide	England
1981	Mike Batt / Autopilot	Rapid Eye Movements	England
1981	Mike Batt	Six Days in Berlin	England
1981	Buldožer	Rok end roul	Yugoslavia
1981	Cardiacs	Toy World	England
1981	Cartoon	Cartoon	US
1981	Dün	Eros	France
1981	East	Játekók	Hungary
1981	Eider Stellaire	Eider Stellaire (K001)	France
1981	Eloy	Planets	Germany
1981	Flame Dream	Out In The Dark	Switzerland
1981	Fred Frith	Speechless	England
1981	Führs & Fröhling	Diary	Germany
1981	Gordi	Gordi 3	Yugoslavia
1981	Grobschnitt	Illegal	Germany
1981	Steve Howe	The Bodast Tapes	England
1981	Kayak	Merlin	Netherlands
1981	Kayak	Eyewitness	Netherlands
1981	Kerrs Pink	Mellom Oss	Norway
1981	Kultivator	Barndomens Stigar	Sweden
1981	Los Jaivas	Alturas de Machu Picchu	Chile
1981	The Muffins	185	US
1981	Na Lepem Prijazni	Na Lepem Prijazni	Yugoslavia
1981	National Health	D.S. Al Coda	England
1981	Pallas	Arrive Alive	Scotland
1981	Quasar	Fire in the sky	England
1981	This Heat	Deceit	England
1981	Univers Zero	Ceux Du Dehors	Belgium

=== Disbandments ===
- Art Bears
- Na Lepem Prijazni (temporarily)
- National Health
- Tako
- Yes (temporarily)
- YU Grupa (temporarily)

=== Events ===
- Robert Fripp and Bill Bruford form new band Discipline, but after initial live dates Fripp decides the band constitutes a new incarnation of King Crimson.
- Former Yes members Chris Squire and Alan White try to put together XYZ with Jimmy Page and Robert Plant from Led Zeppelin, but the project fails to go beyond rehearsals and the recording of several demos at Chris Squire's home studio due to Plant's dislike for the complicated musical arrangements. Steve Howe goes on to form Asia. Yes reformed in 1983.
- National Health keyboardist Alan Gowen dies.
- Aerodrom release the album Tango Bango, making shift towards new wave.
- Gordi release the album Pakleni trio, making shift towards heavy metal.

== 1982 ==
=== Newly formed bands ===
- In Cahoots
- IQ
- Voivod
- Thinking Plague

=== Albums ===
Release date	Artist	Album	Country
1982 Mar 18	Asia	Asia	England
1982 Mar 19	Mike Oldfield	Five Miles Out	England
1982 Mar	Sky	Sky 4: Forthcoming	England / Australia
1982 Apr 9	Jethro Tull	Broadsword and the Beast	England
1982 Apr 23	Camel	The Single Factor	England
1982 May 3	Frank Zappa	Ship Arriving Too Late to Save a Drowning Witch	US
1982 Jun 4	Genesis	Three Sides Live	England
1982 Jun 18	King Crimson	Beat	England
1982 Sep 9	Rush	Signals	Canada
1982 Sep 10	Peter Gabriel	Peter Gabriel	England
1982 Sep	Captain Beefheart & His Magic Band	Ice Cream For Crow	US
1982 Oct	Peter Hammill	Enter K	England
1982 Oct 29	Supertramp	…Famous Last Words…	England
1982 Dec	Twelfth Night	Fact and Fiction	England
1982	Art Zoyd	Phase IV	France
1982	Mike Batt	Zero Zero	England
1982	Begnagrad	Begnagrad	Yugoslavia
1982	Bi Kyo Ran	Bi Kyo Ran	Japan
1982	Eric Burdon	Comeback	Germany
1982	Debile Menthol	Emile au Jardin Patrologique	Switzerland
1982	Drugi Način	Ponovo na putu	Yugoslavia
1982	East	Hűség	Hungary
1982	Etron Fou Leloublan	Les Poumons Gonfles	France
1982	Galija	Ipak verujem u sebe	Yugoslavia
1982	IQ	Seven Stories into Eight	England
1982	Isildurs Bane	Sagan om den irländska älgen	Sweden
1982	Kaipa	Nattdjurstid	Sweden
1982	Kenso	II	Japan
1982	Los Jaivas	Aconcagua	Chile
1982	Jean-Paul Prat	Masal	France
1982	Predmestje	Kamasutra	Yugoslavia
1982	Protos	One Day a New Horizon	England
1982	Radio Noisz Ensemble	Yniverze	Germany
1982	Rebekka	Phoenix	Germany
1982	Stormy Six	Al Volo	Italy
1982	Third Quadrant	Seeing yourself as you really are	England
1982	Univers Zero	Crawling Wind	Belgium
1982	Von Zamla	Zamlaranamma	Sweden

=== Events ===
- 14 July - Pink Floyd releases their movie version of The Wall in the UK (13 Aug in the US).

== 1983 ==
=== Newly formed bands ===
- Apocalypse
- Death
- Fates Warning
- News from Babel

=== Reformed bands ===
- Yes

==== Albums ====
Release date	Artist	Album	Country
1983 Jan 14	Sky	Sky Five Live	England / Australia
1983 Mar 14	Marillion	Script for a Jester's Tear	England
1983 Mar 21	Pink Floyd	The Final Cut	England
1983 Mar 28	Frank Zappa	Baby Snakes	US
1983 Mar 28	Frank Zappa	The Man from Utopia	US
1983 Apr	Steve Hackett	Highly Strung	England
1983 May 27	Mike Oldfield	Crises	UK
1983 Jun 24	Electric Light Orchestra	Secret Messages	England
1983 June	Peter Hammill	Loops and Reels	England
1983 Aug 8	Eddie Jobson and Zinc	The Green Album	England
1983 Aug 12	Asia	Alpha	England
1983 Aug 19	Peter Hammill	Patience	England
1983 Sep 9	IQ	Tales from the Lush Attic	England
1983 Sep	Saga	Heads or Tales	Canada
1983 Oct 3	Genesis	Genesis	England
1983 Nov 7	Yes	90125	England
1983 Nov 18	Ian Anderson	Walk into Light	England
1983 Nov 25	Sky	Cadmium	England / Australia
1983 Nov 30	Bad Religion	Into the Unknown	US
1983	Ange	La Gare de Troyes	France
1983	Art Zoyd	Les Espaces Inquiets	France
1983	Bacamarte	Depois Do Fim	Brazil
1983	Buldožer	Nevino srce	Yugoslavia
1983	Castanarc	Journey To The East	England
1983	Cartoon	Music From Left Field	US
1983	Eskaton	Fiction	France
1983	Etron Fou Leloublan	Les Sillons de la Terre	France
1983	Godley and Creme	Birds of Prey	England
1983	In Spe	In Spe	Estonia
1983	Kaseke	Põletus	Estonia
1983	Queensrÿche	Queensrÿche [EP]	US
1983	Von Zamla	1983	Various

=== Disbandments ===
- Earth & Fire

=== Events ===
- John Wetton is fired from Asia just prior to a Japanese tour and is replaced by Greg Lake. Wetton returned to the band in 1984.
- Yes reform with long-time members Jon Anderson, Chris Squire and Alan White, recruiting ex-member Tony Kaye who was fired in 1970 and new guitarist, Trevor Rabin to form a "Yes for the 1980s".
- After the supportive tour for ...Famous Last Words..., Roger Hodgson leaves Supertramp.

== 1984 ==
=== Albums ===
Release date	Artist	Album	Country
1984 Feb 13	Pallas	The Sentinel	UK
1984 Mar 5	David Gilmour	About Face	England
1984 Mar 12	Marillion	Fugazi	England
1984 Mar 23	King Crimson	Three of a Perfect Pair	England
1984 Apr 9	Zee	Identity	England
1984 Apr 12	Rush	Grace Under Pressure	Canada
1984 Apr 13	Camel	Stationary Traveller	England
1984 Apr 30	Roger Waters	The Pros and Cons of Hitch Hiking	England
1984 Jun 25	Mike Oldfield	Discovery	England
1984 Sep	Steve Hackett	Till We Have Faces	England
1984 Sep 7	Jethro Tull	Under Wraps	England
1984 Sep 7	Queensrÿche	The Warning	US
1984 Oct 1	Roger Hodgson	In the Eye of the Storm	England
1984 Oct 18	Frank Zappa	Them or Us	US
1984 Dec 21	Frank Zappa	Thing-Fish	US
1984	Abel Ganz	Gratuitous Flash	Scotland
1984	Ange	Fou	France
1984	Art Zoyd	Le Mariage du Ciel et l'Enfer	France
1984	Bi Kyo Ran	Parallax	Japan
1984	Barclay James Harvest	Victims of Circumstance	England
1984	Castanarc	Journey to the East	England
1984	Cardiacs	The Seaside	England
1984	Craft	Craft	England
1984	Gunesh Ensemble	Looking at the Earth	Turkmenistan
1984	Isildurs Bane	Sagan om den Irländska Älgen	Sweden
1984	Los Jaivas	Obras de Violeta Parra	Chile
1984	Nazca	Nazca	Mexico
1984	News from Babel	Work Resumed on the Tower	England
1984	Not Drowning, Waving	Another Pond	Australia
1984	Pocket Orchestra	Knebnagäuje	US
1984	Solaris	Marsbéli Krónikák (The Martian Chronicles)	Hungary
1984	Solstice	Silent Dance	England
1984	Thinking Plague	A Thinking Plague	US
1984	Twelfth Night	Live and Let Live	England
1984	Univers Zero	Uzed	Belgium
1984	Uppsala	Uppsala	France

=== Disbandments ===
- Begnagrad
- Gordi
- Predmestje
- Soft Machine

=== Events ===
- Sky: John Williams (acoustic guitar) departs. Remaining members tour Australia with Rick Wakeman.

== 1985 ==
=== Newly formed bands ===
- Dream Theater
- King's X
- Magellan
- Emerson, Lake & Powell

=== Albums ===
Release date	Artist	Album	Country
1985 February 25	Tears for Fears	Songs from the Big Chair	England
1985 May 13	Supertramp	Brother Where You Bound	England
1985 Jun 3	IQ	The Wake	England
1985 Jun 14	Patrick Moraz / Bill Bruford	Flags	England
1985 Jun 17	Marillion	Misplaced Childhood	England
1985 Aug 19	Pendragon	The Jewel	England
1985 Aug 19	Saga	Behaviour	Canada
1985 Oct 11	Rush	Power Windows	Canada
1985 Nov 11	Asia	Astra	England
1985 Nov 11	Hawkwind	The Chronicle of the Black Sword	England
1985 Nov 21	Frank Zappa	Frank Zappa Meets the Mothers of Prevention	US
1985	5uu's	Bel Marduk and Tiamat	US
1985	Debile Menthol	Battre Campagne	Switzerland
1985	Deyss	At King	Switzerland
1985	Egg	Seven Is a Jolly Good Time	England
1985	Godley and Creme	The History Mix Volume 1	England
1985	Horizont	Summer in Town	Russia
1985	Iconoclasta	Reminiscencias	Mexico
1985	In Spe	Typewriter Concerto in D	Estonia
1985	Eddie Jobson	Theme of Secrets	England
1985	Kenso	Kenso III	Japan
1985	Kenso	Music From Five Unknown Musicians	Japan
1985	Minimum Vital	Envol Triangles	France
1985	Not Drowning, Waving	The Little Desert	Australia
1985	Outer Limits	Misty Moon	Japan
1985	Ozric Tentacles	Erpsongs	England
1985	Ozric Tentacles	Tantric Obstacles	England
1985	Bernard Paganotti	Paga	France
1985	Present	Le Poison Qui Rend Fou	Belgium
1985	Robert Wyatt	Old Rottenhat	England

=== Disbandments ===
- Igra Staklenih Perli

=== Events ===
- IQ vocalist Peter Nicholls leaves for personal reasons. He is replaced by Paul Menel who debuts on 14 November 1985.
- Pink Floyd leader, bassist and lyricist Roger Waters leaves due to internal tensions within the band, and declares the band defunct, however the remaining members still continue, releasing A Momentary Lapse of Reason in 1987.

== 1986 ==
=== Newly formed bands ===
- Mastermind
- Mystery

=== Albums ===
Release date	Artist	Album	Country
1986 Jan 27	Frank Zappa	Does Humor Belong in Music?	US
1986 Feb 17	Talk Talk	The Colour of Spring	England
1986 Mar 3	Electric Light Orchestra	Balance of Power	England
1986 Mar	Peter Hammill	Skin	England
1986 Apr 24	GTR	GTR	England
1986 May 19	Peter Gabriel	So	England
1986 Jun 2	Emerson, Lake and Powell	Emerson, Lake & Powell	England
1986 Jun 6	Genesis	Invisible Touch	England
1986 Jul	Twelfth Night	Twelfth Night XII	England
1986 Jul 14	Queensrÿche	Rage for Order	US
1986 Sep 1	David Sylvian	Gone to Earth	England
1986 Nov 3	Peter Hammill	And Close As This	England
1986 Nov	Frank Zappa	Jazz from Hell	US
1986	Ange	Egna	France
1986	Ain Soph	Hat and Field	Japan
1986	Adrian Belew	Desire Caught by the Tail	US
1986	Bellaphon	Delphi	Japan
1986	Biota	Bellowing Room	US
1986	Camberwell Now	The Ghost Trade	England
1986	Coda	Sounds of Passion	Netherlands
1986	IQ	Living Proof	England
1986	Miriodor	Rencontres	Canada
1986	Nazca	Estacion De Sombra	Mexico
1986	News from Babel	Letters Home	England
1986	Outer Limits	A Boy Playing the Magical Bugle Horn	Japan
1986	Pallas	The Wedge	Scotland
1986	Steve Roach	Empetus	US
1986	Shub-Niggurath	Les Morts Vont Vite	France
1986	Swans	Greed	US
1986	Swans	Holy Money	US
1986	Univers Zero	Heatwave	Belgium

=== Disbandments ===
- Electric Light Orchestra
- Emerson, Lake & Powell
- News from Babel

=== Events ===
- Charlie Dominici becomes the lead singer for Dream Theater after firing of Chris Collins.

== 1987 ==
=== Newly formed bands ===
- Devil Doll
- Discipline
- Kingston Wall
- Porcupine Tree

=== Reformed bands ===
- YU Grupa

=== Albums ===
Release date	Artist	Album	Country
1987 Apr	IQ	Nomzamo	England
1987 Jun 15	King Diamond	Abigail	Denmark
1987 Jun 15	Roger Waters	Radio K.A.O.S.	England
1987 Jun 22	Marillion	Clutching at Straws	England
1987 Sep 7	Pink Floyd	A Momentary Lapse of Reason	England
1987 Sep 7	Jethro Tull	Crest of a Knave	England
1987 Sep 8	Rush	Hold Your Fire	Canada
1987 Sep 28	Yes	Big Generator	England
1987 Sep 28	Mike Oldfield	Islands	England
1987 Oct 9	Roger Hodgson	Hai Hai	England
1987 Oct 23	Supertramp	Free as a Bird	England
1987	Abel Ganz	Gullibles Travels	Scotland
1987	Ange	Sève qui peut	France
1987	Art Zoyd	Berlin	France
1987	Barclay James Harvest	Face to Face	England
1987	Bellaphon	Firefly	Japan
1987	Biota	Tinct	US
1987	Blind Owl	Debut at Dusk	US
1987	Deyss	Vision in the Dark	Switzerland
1987	Djam Karet	The Ritual Continues	US
1987	Doctor Nerve	Armed Observation	US
1987	Ezra Winston	Myth of the Chrysavides	Italy
1987	Iconoclasta	Soliloquio	Mexico
1987	Isildurs Bane	Sagan om Ringen	Sweden
1987	Nimal	Nimal	Various
1987	Not Drowning, Waving	Cold and the Crackle	Australia
1987	Outer Limits	The Scene Of Pale Blue	Japan
1987	Premiata Forneria Marconi	Miss Baker	Italy
1987	Thinking Plague	Moonsongs	US
1987	Vermilion Sands	Water Blue	Japan

=== Disbandments ===
- Aerodrom
- Twelfth Night

=== Events ===
- Korni Grupa makes a brief reunion to perform on Legende YU Rocka concerts.
- YU Grupa release their comeback hard rock-oriented album Od zlata jabuka; the band's future releases would feature similar sound.

== 1988 ==
=== Newly formed bands ===
- Anderson Bruford Wakeman Howe

=== Albums ===
Release date	Artist	Album	Country
1988 Jan 25	Ali Project	Gensou Teien	Japan
1988 Mar 4	Devil Doll	The Girl Who Was... Death	Italy
1988 Mar 14	3	To the Power of Three	England
1988 Mar 28	Steve Hackett	Momentum	England
1988 Mar 28	Kings X	Out of the Silent Planet	US
1988 May 3	Queensrÿche	Operation: Mindcrime	US
1988 May 16	Frank Zappa	You Can't Do That on Stage Anymore, Vol. 1	US
1988 Jun 29	Voivod	Dimension Hatröss	Canada
1988 Aug 8	Marty Friedman	Dragon's Kiss	US
1988 Sep 12	Talk Talk	Spirit of Eden	England
1988 Oct 14	Frank Zappa	Broadway the Hard Way	US
1988 Oct 25	Frank Zappa	You Can't Do That on Stage Anymore, Vol. 2	US
1988 Nov 21	Peter Hammill	In a Foreign Town	England
1988 Nov 21	Pink Floyd	Delicate Sound of Thunder	England
1988	Abel Ganz	The Dangers of Strangers	Scotland
1988	5uu's with Motor Totemist Guild	Elements	US
1988	Cardiacs	A Little Man and a House and the Whole World Window	England
1988	Cassiber	A Face We All Know	Germany
1988	Crimson Glory	Transcendence	US
1988	Edhels	Still Dream	Monaco
1988	Fates Warning	No Exit	US
1988	Galadriel	Muttered Promises From An Ageless Pond	Spain
1988	Godley and Creme	Goodbye Blue Sky	England
1988	Halloween	Part One	France
1988	Last Exit	Iron Path	International
1988	Phil Miller	Split Seconds	England
1988	Minimum Vital	Les Saison Marines	France
1988	Miriodor	Miriodor	Canada
1988	Nuova Era	L'Ultimo Viaggio	Italy
1988	Ozric Tentacles	Sliding Gliding Worlds	England
1988	Pendragon	Kowtow	England
1988	Sieges Even	Life Cycle	Germany

=== Disbandments ===
- After the 1988 tour, Supertramp goes on hiatus.

=== Events ===
- Vocalist Fish leaves Marillion and is replaced by Steve Hogarth.
- Yes vocalist Jon Anderson wishes to return to the "classic Yes" sound and so forms Anderson Bruford Wakeman Howe with Yes alumni.
- Drummer Gabriel Parra of Los Jaivas died in a car accident in Peru.

== 1989 ==
=== Newly formed bands ===
- Atavism of Twilight
- Echolyn
- Electric Light Orchestra Part Two
- Enchant
- Iona
- Keep the Dog
- Conception

=== Albums ===
Release date	Artist	Album	Country
1989 Feb	Ozric Tentacles	Pungent Effulgent	England
1989 Mar 6	Dream Theater	When Dream and Day Unite	US
1989 May 8	Phish	Junta	US
1989 May 22	Queen	The Miracle	England
1989 Jun 5	Peter Gabriel	Passion	England
1989 Jun 20	Anderson, Bruford, Wakeman, Howe	Anderson, Bruford, Wakeman, Howe	England
1989 Jun 27	King's X	Gretchen Goes to Nebraska	US
1989 Aug 21	Jethro Tull	Rock Island	England
1989 Sep 25	Marillion	Seasons End	England
1989 Sep 25	Tears for Fears	The Seeds of Love	England
1989 Nov 13	Frank Zappa	You Can't Do That on Stage Anymore, Vol. 3	US
1989 Nov 17	Rush	Presto	Canada
1989	After Crying	Opus 1	Hungary
1989	After Dinner	Paradise of Replica	Japan
1989	Art Zoyd	Nosferatu / F.W. Murnau	France
1989	Biota	Tumble	US
1989	Birdsongs of the Mesozoic	Faultline	US
1989	Cardiacs	Cardiacs Live	England
1989	Djam Karet	Reflections From the Firepool	US
1989	Fates Warning	Perfect Symmetry	US
1989	Fulano	En El Bunker	Chile
1989	Horizont	The Portrait of a Boy	Russia
1989	IQ	Are You Sitting Comfortably?	England
1989	Isildurs Bane	Cheval - Volonte de Rocher	Sweden
1989	Kenso	Sparta	Japan
1989	Los Jaivas	Si Tú No Estás	Chile
1989	Phil Miller	Cutting Both Ways	England
1989	Not Drowning, Waving	Claim	Australia
1989	Nuova Era	Dopo l'Infinito	Italy
1989	Outer Limits	Outer Mania	Japan
1989	Quasar	The Loreli	England
1989	Saga	The Beginner's Guide to Throwing Shapes	Canada
1989	Tangle Edge	In Search of A New Dawn	Norway
1989	Thinking Plague	In This Life	US

=== Disbandments ===
- Charlie Dominici leaves Dream Theater

=== Events ===
- IQ - vocalist Paul Menel and bass player Tim Essau depart.

== See also ==
- Timeline of progressive rock: other decades: 1960s - 1970s - 1990s - 2000s - 2010s – 2020s
- Timeline of progressive rock (Parent article)
- Progressive rock
- Canterbury Scene
- Symphonic rock
- Avant-rock
- Rock in Opposition
- Neo-prog
- Progressive metal
- Jazz fusion
