= Timeline of progressive rock =

This is an introductory page to timelines of artists, albums, and events in progressive rock and its subgenres. While this page shows the formation of significant bands in the genre, the detailed timeline is presented in separate articles for each decade.

== Timeline by decade ==
Click on the header for each decade to see the detailed timeline.

=== 1960s ===
Newly formed bands

- Golden Earring (1961)
- Phoenix (1962)
- Sfinx (1962)
- Omega (1962)
- Los Jaivas (1963)
- The Moody Blues (1964)
- Strawbs (1964)
- Pink Floyd (1965)
- Barclay James Harvest (1966)
- Soft Machine (1966)
- Procol Harum (1967)
- Aphrodite's Child (1967)
- Genesis (1967)
- Gong (1967)
- Jethro Tull (1967)
- Mike Oldfield (1967)
- The Nice (1967)
- Van der Graaf Generator (1967)
- Can (1968)
- Caravan (1968)
- Deep Purple (1968)
- Egg (1968)
- King Crimson (1968)
- Krokodil (1968)
- Rush (1968)
- Skin Alley (1968)
- Yes (1968)
- Ange (1969)
- Argent (1969)
- Atomic Rooster (1969)
- Audience (1969)
- Curved Air (1969)
- Banco del Mutuo Soccorso (1969)
- Beggar's Opera (1969)
- Magma (1969)
- Rare Bird (1969)
- Renaissance(1969)
- Supertramp (1969)
- Uriah Heep (1969)
- Triumvirat (1969)
- Congreso (1969)
- Nektar (1969)
- Quintessence (1969)
- Hawkwind (1969)
- Warm Dust (1969)
- Focus (1969)

=== 1970s ===
Newly formed bands

- Dixie Dregs (1970)
- Electric Light Orchestra (1970)
- Emerson, Lake and Palmer (1970)
- Gentle Giant (1970)
- Arthur Brown's Kingdom Come (1970)
- Queen (1970)
- Roxy Music (1970)
- Styx (1970)
- Alphataurus (1971)
- Camel (1971)
- Captain Beyond (1971)
- Kansas (1971)
- Celeste (1972)
- Premiata Forneria Marconi (1972)
- Return to Forever (1972)
- Kaipa (1973)
- Bijelo Dugme (1974)
- Machiavel (1974)
- Ambrosia (band) (1975)
- England (1975)
- Steve Hackett (1975)
- The Alan Parsons Project (1976)
- Peter Gabriel (1976)
- Pallas (1976)
- Jon Anderson (1976)
- FM (1976)
- Cardiacs (1977)
- Crack (1977)
- Saga (1977)
- U.K. (1977)
- Pendragon (1978)
- Anyone's Daughter (1978)
- Twelfth Night (1978)
- King's X (1979)
- Marillion (1979)
- Roine Stolt (1979)

=== 1980s ===
Newly formed bands

- IQ (1980)
- Asia (1981)
- Queensrÿche (1982)
- It Bites (1982)
- Fates Warning (1983)
- Ozric Tentacles (1983)
- Pain of Salvation (1984)
- Fulano (1984)
- Cyan (1984)
- Dream Theater (1985)
- Galahad (1985)
- Shadow Gallery (1985)
- The Bleeding Heart Band (1986)
- Dreamscape (1986)
- Cynic (1987)
- Meshuggah (1987)
- No-Man (1987)
- Porcupine Tree (1987)
- Anderson Bruford Wakeman Howe (1988)
- Psychotic Waltz (1988)
- Jordan Rudess (1988)
- Echolyn (1989)
- Enchant (1989)

=== 1990s ===
Newly formed bands

- Iona (1990)
- Bad Dreams (1990)
- Anathema (1990)
- Big Big Train (1990)
- Opeth (1990)
- Tool (1990)
- Ulysses (1990)
- Anekdoten (1991)
- Änglagård (1991)
- Glass Hammer (1992)
- Spock's Beard (1992)
- Ayreon (1993)
- The Flower Kings (1993)
- Guapo (1994)
- Muse (1994)
- Symphony X (1994)
- Nad Sylvan (1995)
- Arena (1995)
- Coheed and Cambria (1995)
- Mew (1995)
- Sylvan (1995)
- Devin Townsend (1996)
- Evergrey (1996)
- Gazpacho (1996)
- IZZ (1996)
- maudlin of the Well (1996)
- Liquid Tension Experiment (1997)
- Karnivool (1997)
- RPWL (1997)
- Oceansize (1998)
- MullMuzzler (1999)
- Neal Morse (1999)
- The Pineapple Thief (1999)
- Sleepytime Gorilla Museum (1999)
- Transatlantic (1999)
- Wobbler (1999)
- Magenta (1999)
- Derek Sherinian (1999)

=== 2000s ===
Newly formed bands

- Planet X (2000)
- Between the Buried and Me (2000)
- Mastodon (2000)
- Seventh Wonder (2000)
- MediaBanda (2000)
- Magic Pie (2001)
- Beardfish (2001)
- Leprous (2001)
- The Mars Volta (2001)
- Riverside (2001)
- Karmakanic (2002)
- Phideaux (2002)
- The Tangent (2002)
- OSI (2002)
- Born of Osiris (2003)
- Kayo Dot (2003)
- Moon Safari (2003)
- Pure Reason Revolution (2003)
- Architects (2004)
- Frost* (2004)
- Soen (2004)
- Scale the Summit (2004)
- John Petrucci (2005)
- The Dear Hunter (2005)
- Periphery (2005)
- Jolly (2006)
- Vola (2006)
- Animals as Leaders (2007)
- Haken (2007)
- Stick Men (2007)
- Steven Wilson (2008)
- Matt Stevens (musician) (2008)
- Lifesigns (2008)
- Bent Knee (2009)
- Django Django (2009)
- Thank You Scientist (2009)

=== 2010s ===
Newly formed bands

- Hasse Fröberg & Musical Companion (2010)
- Iamthemorning (2010)
- King Gizzard & the Lizard Wizard (2010)
- The Fierce and the Dead (2010)
- Polyphia (2010)
- Seven Impale (2010)
- Sithu Aye (2011)
- The Aristocrats (2011)
- Caligula's Horse (2011)
- Flying Colors (2011)
- Hällas (2011)
- Intervals (2011)
- Kyros (2012)
- Astronoid (2012)
- Jonas Lindberg & The Other Side (2012)
- The Neal Morse Band (2013)
- Eric Gillette (2013)
- We Came From Space (2013)
- Tiger Moth Tales (2013)
- Levin Minnemann Rudess (2013)
- The Mute Gods (2014)
- Southern Empire (2015)
- Lonely Robot (2015)
- Novena (2016)
- This Winter Machine (2016)
- The Cyberiam (2016)
- The Sea Within (2017)
- Sons of Apollo (2017)
- Black Midi (2017)
- Pattern-Seeking Animals (2018)
- sleep token (2016)

=== 2020s ===
Newly formed bands

- TEMIC (2023)

== See also ==
- Timeline of progressive rock: 1960s - 1970s - 1980s - 1990s - 2000s - 2010s - 2020s
- Progressive rock
- Canterbury Scene
- Symphonic rock
- Avant-rock
- Rock in Opposition
- Neo-prog
- Progressive metal
- Jazz fusion
- Djent
