= Jutro =

Jutro, meaning Morning in a number of Slavic languages, may refer to one of two Yugoslav bands:

- Jutro (Ljubljana band), a Yugoslav rock band formed in Ljubljana
- Jutro (Sarajevo band), a Yugoslav rock band formed in Sarajevo, notable as the direct predecessor of the band Bijelo Dugme
