= Timeline of progressive rock (1960–1969) =

This is a timeline of artists, albums, and events in progressive rock and its subgenres. This article contains the timeline for the period 1960–1969.

== 1962–1967: Background and roots ==
The roots of progressive rock developed from pop groups in the 1960s, like the Beatles and the Yardbirds, who "progressed" rock and roll by exploiting new recording techniques, and by merging electric blues with various other music styles such as Indian ragas, oriental melodies and Gregorian chants. Hegarty and Halliwell identify the Beatles, the Beach Boys, the Doors, the Pretty Things, the Zombies, the Byrds, the Grateful Dead and Pink Floyd as "not merely as precursors of prog" but "essential developments of progressiveness in its early days". According to musicologist Walter Everett, the Beatles' "experimental timbres, rhythms, tonal structures, and poetic texts" on their albums Rubber Soul (1965) and Revolver (1966) "encouraged a legion of young bands that were to create progressive rock in the early 1970s". Dylan's poetry, the Mothers of Invention's album Freak Out! (1966) and the Beatles' Sgt. Pepper's Lonely Hearts Club Band (1967) were all important in progressive rock's development. The productions of Phil Spector were key influences, as they introduced the possibility of using the recording studio to create music that otherwise could never be achieved. The Beach Boys' Pet Sounds (1966), which Brian Wilson intended as an answer to Rubber Soul influenced the Beatles when they made Sgt. Pepper.

Folk rock groups such as the Byrds, based their initial sound on that of the Beatles. In turn, the Byrds' vocal harmonies inspired those of Yes, and British folk rock bands like Fairport Convention, who emphasised instrumental virtuosity. Some of these artists, such as the Incredible String Band and Shirley and Dolly Collins, would prove influential on progressive rock through their use of instruments borrowed from world music and early music.

=== Recordings influential on later progressive rock bands ===
Release date	Artist	Recording	Country
16 May 1966	The Beach Boys	Pet Sounds	US
27 June 1966	The Mothers of Invention	Freak Out!	US
5 August 1966	The Beatles	Revolver	England
10 October 1966	The Beach Boys	"Good Vibrations"	US
November 1966	Love	Da Capo	US
January 1967	The Left Banke	Walk Away Renée/Pretty Ballerina	US
1 February 1967	Jefferson Airplane	Surrealistic Pillow	US
March 1967	The Velvet Underground and Nico	The Velvet Underground & Nico	US
26 May 1967	The Beatles	Sgt. Pepper's Lonely Hearts Club Band	England
26 May 1967	The Mothers of Invention	Absolutely Free	US
July 1967	The Incredible String Band	The 5000 Spirits or the Layers of the Onion	Scotland
24 July 1967	The Beach Boys	"Heroes and Villains"	US
August 1967	Vanilla Fudge	Vanilla Fudge	US
4 August 1967	Pink Floyd	The Piper at the Gates of Dawn	England
September 1967	Procol Harum	Procol Harum	England
October 1967	Nirvana	The Story of Simon Simopath	England
November 1967	Love	Forever Changes	US
17 November 1967	The Moody Blues	Days of Future Passed	England
27 November 1967	Jefferson Airplane	After Bathing at Baxter's	US
8 December 1967	Traffic	Mr. Fantasy	England

=== Date of formation of bands who are later identified as progressive ===
- Phoenix (1962)
- Omega (1962)
- Dinamiti (1963)
- Sfinx (1963)
- Los Jaivas (1963)
- The Moody Blues (1964)
- The Wilde Flowers (1964)
- Pink Floyd (1965)
- The Syn (1965)
- Nirvana (1965)
- Barclay James Harvest (1966)
- Family (1966)
- Sam Gopal (1966)
- Soft Machine (1966)
- Stormy Six (1966)
- Touch (1966)
- Unit Delta Plus (later White Noise) (1966)
- Genesis (1967)
- Quill (1967)
- Gong (1967)
- Jethro Tull (1967)
- The Nice (1967)
- Procol Harum (1967)
- Supersister (1967)
- Traffic (1967)
- Van der Graaf Generator (1967)

=== Disbandments ===
- The Syn (1967–1969)
- The Wilde Flowers (1967–1968)

=== Events ===
- David Gilmour joins Pink Floyd in December 1967.

== 1968 ==
=== Newly formed bands ===
- Amon Düül II
- Art Zoyd
- Brainbox
- Can
- Caravan
- Catherine Ribeiro + 2Bis
- Colosseum
- Deep Purple
- Dogovor iz 1804.
- Earth & Fire
- Henry Cow
- King Crimson
- Korni Grupa
- Krokodil
- O Terço
- Porodična Manufaktura Crnog Hleba
- Rush
- Yes

=== Albums ===
Release date	Artist	Album	Country
22 January 1968	Spirit	Spirit	US
February 1968	Vanilla Fudge	The Beat Goes On	US
21 February 1968	Blood, Sweat & Tears	Child Is Father to the Man	US
1 March 1968	The Nice	The Thoughts of Emerlist Davjack	England
4 March 1968	The Mothers of Invention	We're Only in It for the Money	US
6 March 1968	The United States of America	The United States of America	US
March 1968	The Incredible String Band	The Hangman's Beautiful Daughter	Scotland
March 1968	The Move	Move	England
13 May 1968	Frank Zappa	Lumpy Gravy – An original rare release appeared in late 1967 on Capitol, but was pulled quickly because of threatened legal action by MGM. This MGM/Verve release was the first popularly available version.	US
June 1968	The Crazy World of Arthur Brown	The Crazy World of Arthur Brown	England
28 June 1968	Pink Floyd	A Saucerful of Secrets	England
June 1968	Fairport Convention	Fairport Convention	England
June 1968	Vanilla Fudge	Renaissance	US
5 July 1968	Tyrannosaurus Rex	My People Were Fair and Had Sky in Their Hair... But Now They're Content to Wear Stars on Their Brows	England
17 July 1968	Deep Purple	Shades of Deep Purple	UK
19 July 1968	Family	Music in a Doll's House	England
26 July 1968	The Moody Blues	In Search of the Lost Chord	England
29 July 1968	The Jeff Beck Group	Truth	UK
13 September 1968	Giles, Giles and Fripp	The Cheerful Insanity of Giles, Giles and Fripp	England
September 1968	Procol Harum	Shine on Brightly	England
September 1968	Jefferson Airplane	Crown of Creation	US
October 1968	Aphrodite's Child	End of the World	Greece
October 1968	Traffic	Traffic	England
October 1968	Deep Purple	The Book of Taliesyn	UK
14 October 1968	Tyrannosaurus Rex	Prophets, Seers & Sages: The Angels of the Ages	England
25 October 1968	Jethro Tull	This Was	England
1 November 1968	George Harrison	Wonderwall Music	England
November 1968	The Nice	Ars Longa Vita Brevis	England
November 1968	The Left Banke	The Left Banke Too	US
November 1968	The Incredible String Band	Wee Tam and the Big Huge	Scotland
11 December 1968	Blood, Sweat & Tears	Blood, Sweat & Tears	US
December 1968	The Pretty Things	S.F. Sorrow	England
December 1968	Soft Machine	The Soft Machine – the original album was only available in the US, an import in the UK; later re-issued as Volume One.	England
December 1968	Spirit	The Family Plays Together	US
1968	International Harvester – originally called Pärson Sound (recordings from Pärson Sound weren't released until 2001)	Sov gott Rose-Marie	Sweden
1968	Touch	Touch	US

=== Disbandments ===
- The United States of America

=== Events ===
- Syd Barrett leaves Pink Floyd in April 1968.

== 1969 ==
=== Newly formed bands ===
- Atomic Rooster
- Beggars Opera
- Egg
- Elonkorjuu
- Eloy
- Embryo
- Focus
- Fusion Orchestra
- Glass
- Hawkwind
- If
- Marsupilami
- May Blitz
- Nektar
- Organisation
- Rare Bird
- Renaissance
- Samla Mammas Manna
- Stackridge
- Supertramp
- Triumvirat
- Uriah Heep
- Wigwam

=== Albums ===
Release date	Artist	Album	Country
January 1969	Caravan	Caravan	England
January 1969	Sam Gopal	Escalator	England
February 1969	Jefferson Airplane	Bless Its Pointed Little Head	US
February 1969	Vanilla Fudge	Near the Beginning	US
5 March 1969	The Byrds	Dr. Byrds & Mr. Hyde	US
March 1969	Colosseum	Those Who Are About to Die Salute You	England
March 1969	Family	Family Entertainment	England
28 March 1969	Genesis	From Genesis to Revelation	England
21 April 1969	The Mothers of Invention	Uncle Meat	US
25 April 1969	The Moody Blues	On the Threshold of a Dream	England
28 April 1969	Chicago	Chicago Transit Authority	US
9 May 1969	George Harrison	Electronic Sound	England
16 May 1969	Tyrannosaurus Rex	Unicorn	England
19 May 1969	The Who	Tommy	England
May 1969	Traffic	Last Exit	England
13 June 1969	Pink Floyd	More	England
16 June 1969	Captain Beefheart & His Magic Band	Trout Mask Replica	US
June 1969	Deep Purple	Deep Purple	UK
June 1969	It's a Beautiful Day	It's a Beautiful Day	US
June 1969	Procol Harum	A Salty Dog	England
25 July 1969	Yes	Yes	England
25 July 1969	Jethro Tull	Stand Up	England
30 July 1969	Miles Davis	In a Silent Way	US
August 1969	Santana	Santana	US
August 1969	The Nice	The Nice	England
September 1969	Soft Machine	Volume Two	England
September 1969	Van der Graaf Generator	The Aerosol Grey Machine	England, however album was originally released only in the US
September 1969	Vanilla Fudge	Rock & Roll	US
26 September 1969	The Beatles	Abbey Road	England
10 October 1969	King Crimson	In the Court of the Crimson King	England
10 October 1969	Frank Zappa	Hot Rats	US
October 1969	Spirit	Clear	US
7 November 1969	Pink Floyd	Ummagumma	England
7 November 1969	Manfred Mann Chapter Three	Manfred Mann Chapter Three	UK
21 November 1969	The Moody Blues	To Our Children's Children's Children	England
November 1969	Quintessence	In Blissful Company	UK
November 1969	Kevin Ayers	Joy of a Toy	UK
November 1969	The Incredible String Band	Changing Horses	Scotland
November 1969	Renaissance	Renaissance	England
December 1969	Fairport Convention	Liege & Lief	England
December 1969	Wigwam	Hard 'n' Horny	Finland
1969	Amon Düül	Psychedelic Underground	Germany
1969	Amon Düül	Collapsing / Singvögel Rückwärts & Co	Germany
1969	Amon Düül II	Phallus Dei	Germany
1969	Brainbox	Brainbox	Netherlands
1969	Cromagnon	Orgasm	US
1969	East of Eden	Mercator Projected	England
1969	Catherine Ribeiro + 2Bis	Catherine Ribeiro + 2Bis	France
1969	Rare Bird	Rare Bird	UK
1969	The Tony Williams Lifetime	Emergency!	US

=== Disbandments ===
- Dinamiti

== See also ==
- Timeline of progressive rock: other decades: 1970s – 1980s – 1990s – 2000s – 2010s – 2020s
- Timeline of progressive rock (Parent article)
- Progressive rock
- Canterbury scene
- Symphonic rock
- Avant-rock
- Rock in Opposition
- Neo-prog
- Progressive metal
- Jazz fusion

== Sources ==
- Cotner, John Sidney (2001), Archetypes of progressiveness in rock, ca. 1966–1973, University of Wisconsin-Madison
- Hegarty, Paul; Halliwell, Martin (2011), Beyond and Before: Progressive Rock Since the 1960s, New York: The Continuum International Publishing Group, ISBN 978-0-8264-2332-0
- Macan, Edward (1997), Rocking the Classics: English Progressive Rock and the Counterculture, Oxford: Oxford University Press, ISBN 0-19-509887-0
- Martin, Bill (1996), Music of Yes: Structure and Vision in Progressive Rock, Chicago: Open Court
- Martin, Bill (1998), Listening to the Future: The Time of Progressive Rock, Chicago: Open Court, ISBN 0-8126-9368-X
- Povey, Glenn (2008) [2007]. Echoes: The Complete History of Pink Floyd. Mind Head Publishing. ISBN 978-0-9554624-1-2.
- Sweers, Britta (2004), Electric Folk: The Changing Face of English Traditional Music, New York: Oxford University Press
- Tamm, Eric (1995), Brian Eno: His Music and the Vertical Color of Sound, Da Capo Press, ISBN 0-306-80649-5, archived from the original on 5 December 2006
