= ZKP RTLJ =

Založba kaset in plošč RTV Ljubljana
- Founded: 1974
- Status: Defunct (succeeded by Založba kaset in plošč RTV Slovenija in 1990)
- Genre: Various
- Country of origin: SFR Yugoslavia
- Location: Ljubljana
- Official website: Official website

Založba kaset in plošč RTV Ljubljana or Založba kaset in plošč Radiotelevizije Ljubljana (acronym ZKP RTLJ, meaning Publishing and Record Label RTV Ljubljana in Slovene), was a major record label in the former SFR Yugoslavia, based Ljubljana, Socialist Republic of Slovenia. In 1990, at the start of the breakup of Yugoslavia, the name of the company was changed to Založba kaset in plošč RTV Slovenija. It was and still remains a leading publishing firm in Slovenia.

== History ==
Založba kaset in plošč RTV Ljubljana was the music production branch of the national broadcaster Radiotelevizija Ljubljana. In 1990, at the start of the breakup of Yugoslavia, the name of the company was changed to Založba kaset in plošč RTV Slovenija.

The products of the company came out in the form of records in 1974, and CD/cassettes from 1986, and carried the company's logo.

== Artists ==
The label is notable for signing numerous eminent former Yugoslav pop and rock. Some of the artists that have been signed to ZKP RTLJ include:

- Atomsko Sklonište
- Šaban Bajramović
- Begnagrad
- Nikola Čuturilo
- DAG
- Den Za Den
- Ekatarina Velika
- Neca Falk
- Faraoni
- Gordi
- Jutro
- Kameleoni
- Kerber
- Kozmetika
- Tereza Kesovija
- Srđan Marjanović
- Radomir Mihajlović
- Oko
- Pankrti
- Pop Mašina
- Poslednja Igra Leptira
- Laza & Ipe
- September
- Slomljena Stakla
- Smak
- Suncokret
- S Vremena Na Vreme
- Tako
- Neda Ukraden
- Vatreni Poljubac
- Videosex
- YU Grupa
- Zebra

Like other former Yugoslav major record labels, Založba kaset in plošč RTV Ljubljana was also an authorized publisher of foreign titles for the former Yugoslav market. It released albums by eminent international pop and rock stars such as: Blondie, Depeche Mode, Electric Light Orchestra, Motörhead, Men Without Hats, Grateful Dead, The Jam, Jethro Tull, Madness, Prince, Spandau Ballet, Bruce Springsteen, Ike & Tina Turner, Ultravox, and others.

== Competition ==
Other major labels in the former Socialist Federal Republic of Yugoslavia were: PGP-RTB and Jugodisk from Belgrade, Jugoton and Suzy from Zagreb, Diskoton from Sarajevo, Diskos from Aleksandrovac, and others.

== Gallery ==
ZKP RTLJ company logo on the Yazoo album Upstairs at Eric's, 1982

S' vetrom uz lice by Ekaterina Velika, featuring ZKP RTLJ company logo as well as Dolby logo, 1986
