= Neca Falk =

Serbian and Yugoslav musician (born 1950)

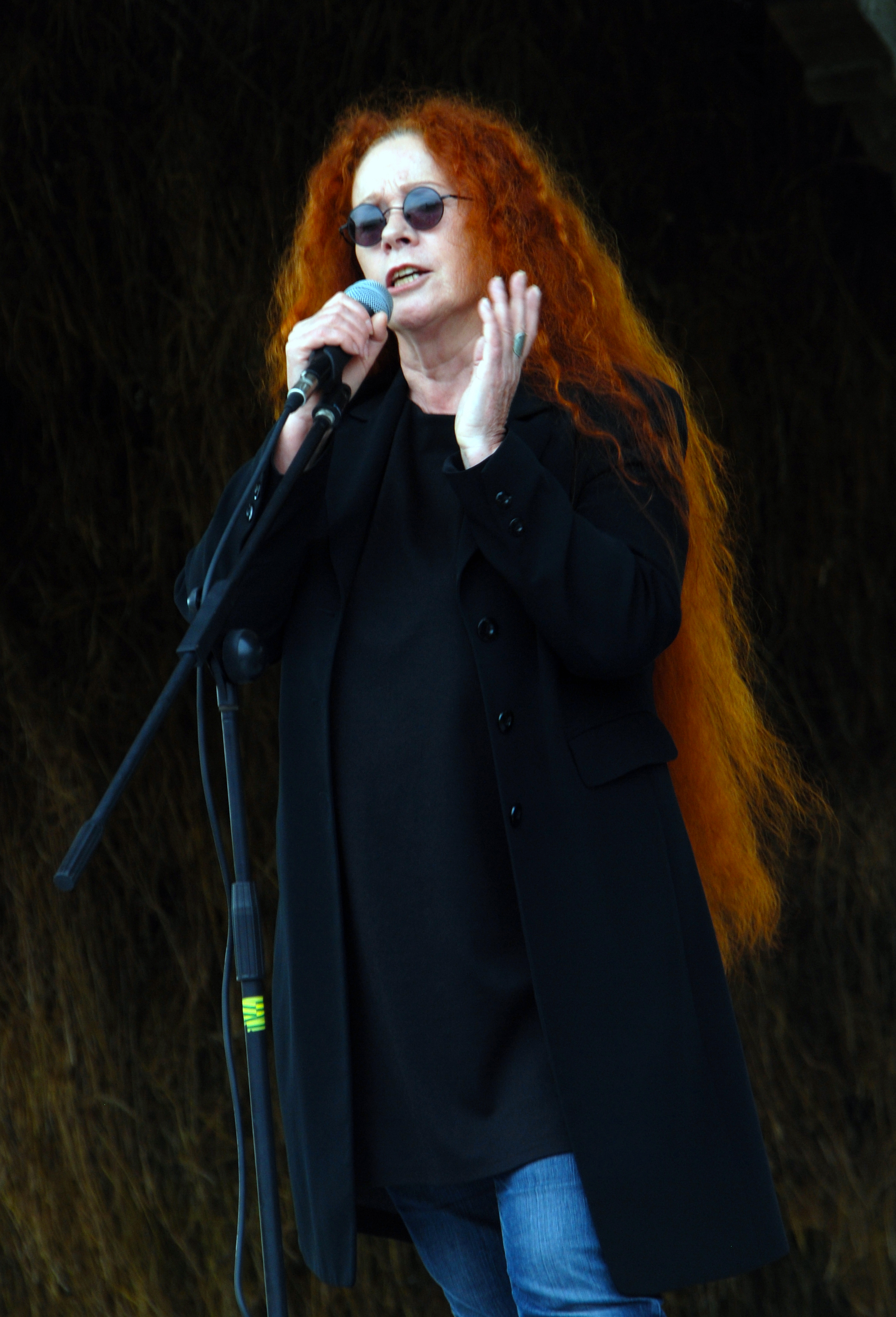
- Neca Falk in 2014
- Born: Marjeta Falk; 19 June 1950 (age 76); Maribor, PR Slovenia, FPR Yugoslavia
- Occupations: Singer; songwriter; actress; painter; art photographer; filmmaker
- Years active: 1969–present
- Musical career
- Genres: Chanson; rock; pop; jazz; children's music
- Instrument: Vocals
- Labels: Helidon; ZKP RTLJ; MK Ljubljana; ZIT Ljubljana; Mačji disk; Založba Pivec

Marjeta "Neca" Falk (born 19 June 1950) is a Slovenian and Yugoslav singer, songwriter, actress, painter, art photographer and filmmaker. Best known for her musical career, Falk was a prominent act of the Yugoslav rock scene.

Falk started her musical career in late 1960s, simultaneously performing chansons on Yugoslav pop festivals and performing as frontress of several rock bands. She released her debut album Danes in 1977. With her second album, the 1978 Vsi ljudje hitijo, she moved towards rock sound. With the albums Najjači ostaju (1980) and Nervozna (1981) Falk, recognizable for her long ginger hair, established herself as one of the most popular female vocalists of the Yugoslav rock scene. In mid-1980s, she turned towards children's music, releasing several albums with children's songs, returning to her pop and rock roots with her 1993 album Neca Falk.

A graduate from the Maribor Faculty of Arts, Falk has exhibited her paintings and photographs, acted in several theatre plays and directed several short films.

== Biography ==
=== Musical career ===
Falk started her musical career at the age of 19, performing at the 1969 Ljubljana Youth Festival held in Tivoli Hall. In the early 1970s, she was the vocalist for the bands Boemi (The Bohemians) and Rdeči Dečki (The Red Boys).

In 1971, Falk and former Bele Vrane member Bor Gostiša performed the duet "Mi smo mi" ("We Are Us") on Maribor festival Vesela jesen '71. (Merry Autumn of '71). The song was released on a 7-inch single, which was Falk's discographyc debut. Since 1972, she appeared regularly on the Slovenska popevka festival of popular music, held in Ljubljana and Celje. In 1973, with singer Alfi Nipič she recorded duets "Ljubim te, kličem te" ("I Love You, I'm Calling You") and "Kako si sva različna" ("How Different You Are"), released on a 7-inch single. During the same year, she starred in the 45-minute musical film Dekle iz šestega nadstropja (The Girl from the Sixth Floor) shot by TV Ljubljana. In 1975, she debuted at Opatija Festival, and a year later she debuted in theatre, acting in Ljubljana Drama Theatre's production of John Arden's Live Like Pigs. The production featured music composed by Dečo Žgur and performed by Yugoslav jazz rock band September.

In 1977, Falk released her debut album Danes (Today) through Helidon record label. The album featured songs authored by Bojan Adamič, Jani Golob and Dečo Žgur. With her second album, entitled Vsi ljudje hitijo (All People Hurry), released in 1978 through ZKP RTLJ, she moved towards mainstream rock sound. The album songs were authored by singer-songwriters Andrej Šifrer and Tomaž Domicelj. The album included a cover of the traditional song "Banks of the Ohio", entitled "Dravski most" ("Bridge on Drava"), and the song "Zaspao si u mojoj kosi" ("You Fell Asleep in My Hair"), recorded with hard rock band Atomsko Sklonište. The members of Atomsko Sklonište had previously collaborated with Falk's husband, photographer Tone Stojko.

In 1980, Falk released well-received album Najjači ostaju (The Strongest Survive). The album was produced by British producers Dave Cook and Anthony David, and featured songs authored by Cook, Andrej Šifrer, Tomaž Domicelj and the members of Atomsko Sklonište. The album included a cover of Joni Mitchell's song "Both Sides, Now" entitled "Z več plati" ("With Many Sides"). In 1980, Falk won the Audience Award at Slovenska popevka festival for her performance of the song "Storila bom to" ("I Will Do That"). At the time, Falk frequently performed with the jazz rock band Predmestje, and in 1981, she recorded the single "Neću" with the group. Following the single release, she released her fourth studio album Nervozna (Nervous). The album was recorded with British studio musicians and co-produced by Dave Cook and Chris Burkett. The album brought the hit "Banane" ("Bananas"), written by Tomaž Domicelj. The song "Živiš jeftine romane" ("You're Living like in Pulp Novels") featured a part spoken by Belgrade radio DJ Marko Janković.

Simultaneously with Nervozna, Falk released the children's music album Zlata lađa (Golden Ship). The album featured music composed by Jerko Novak and lyrics written by Kajetan Kovič. In the mid-1980s, Falk turned towards children's music, releasing the albums Pika poka (1985), featuring music composed by Andrej Pompe and lyrics written by Lily Novi, Maček Muri in Muca Maca (Muri the Cat and Pussy Cat, 1985), with music by Jerko Novak and lyrics by Kajetan Kovič, Zdravilo za strah (A Cure for Fear, 1987), with music composed by Jerko Novak and lyrics written by Boris Novak, and Mačji sejem (Cat Fair, 1992), featuring music by Jerko Novak and lyrics by Kovič.

Falk's 1993 album Neca Falk featured new versions of her songs from late 1970s and early 1980s. Her 1996 album Portreti (Portraits) featured acoustic pop songs with lyrics written by Falk herself. On her following album, Življenja krog (The Circle of Life), released in 2000, Falk presented herself as composer of acoustic songs dominated by bowed string instruments. Most of the album lyrics were written by Kajetan Kovič, with the title track being a Slovene language cover of Joni Mitchell's "The Circle Game". During the same year, the compilation album entitled Najjači ostaju was released, featuring songs from Falk's second and third studio album and the single version of "Zaspao si u mojoj kosi". In 2001, she recorded the album Neca Falk v teatru (Neca Falk in Theatre), featuring songs from the theatre plays in which she had appeared – Live Like Pigs, The Rocky Horror Show, Marathon, Stench Opera and In The Slovenian Mountains.

In 2014, Falk released her latest studio album Od daleč (From Afar). The album featured acoustic songs, composed by Boštjan Narat of the band Katalena. The album recording featured Narat (guitar), Žika Golob (double bass), Danilo Ženko (keyboards) and Boštjan Gombač (clarinet).

=== Other activities ===
Falk acted in several theatre plays: Live Like Pigs, The Rocky Horror Show, Marathon, Stench Opera and In The Slovenian Mountains. She graduated from Maribor Faculty of Arts. Several covers of her albums featured her paintings and aquarelles. Falk also had a number of exhibits of her photographs, and in 1987 published a book of photographs entitled Fotografije / Photographs. She has directed several short films.

== Legacy ==
In 1998, the album Najjači ostaju was polled as 59th on the list of 100 Greatest Yugoslav Popular Music Albums in the book YU 100: najbolji albumi jugoslovenske rok i pop muzike (YU 100: The Best Albums of Yugoslav Pop and Rock Music).

In 2000, Slovenian jazz guitarist Primož Grašić recorded his versions of Falk's songs from her albums Portreti and Življenja krog for his album Tihožitja (Still Lifes). In 2008, Slovenian singer Alenka Godec recorded a cover of "Vsi ljudje hitijo" for her album So najlepše pesmi že napisane (The Most Beautiful Songs Have Already Been Written).

== Discography ==
=== Studio albums ===
- Danes (1977)
- Vsi ljudje hitijo (1978)
- Najjači ostaju (1980)
- Nervozna (1981)
- Zlata lađa (1981)
- Pika poka (1985)
- Maček Muri in Muca Maca (1985)
- Zdravilo za strah (1987)
- Mačji sejem (1992)
- Neca Falk (1993)
- Portreti (1996)
- Življenja krog (2000)
- Neca Falk v teatru (2001)
- Od daleč (2014)

=== Compilation albums ===
- Mačje mesto (1992)
- Dravski most (1994)
- Vsi ljudje hitijo (2009)

=== Singles ===
- "Živeja je en coprjak" / "Mož naj bo doma" (1972)
- "Sama fanta našla si bom" / "Vzemi me" (1973)
- "Ljubim te, kličem te / "Kako si sva različna" (With Alfi Nipič; 1974)
- "Dobro jutro, dober dan" / "Balada" (1978)
- "Vsi ljudje hitijo" / "Tako dekle" (1978)
- "Zaspao si u mojoj kosi" / "Tvoje su oči pune rose" (1978)
- "Toliko vrediš koliko daš" / "Samo najjači ostaju" (1980)
- "Neću" / "Formula 1" (1981)
- "Banane" / "Živiš jeftine romane" (1981)

== Bibliography ==
- Fotografije / Photographs (1987)

== Filmography ==
=== Short films ===
Year	Title	Notes
2001	Bus No. 20	Writer, director
2010	Kastellčeva ulica – trije pogledi	Writer, director
2012	Putovanje v nič	Writer, director
2012	Vmesni prostor	Writer, director
