= De De Lind =

Italian progressive rock band

- Origin: Varese, Italy
- Genres: Italian progressive rock, Beat
- Years active: 1969–1973
- Labels: Windsor, Mercury
- Past members: Vito Paradiso; Gilberto Trama; Matteo Vitolli; Eddy Lorigiola; Ricky Rebajoli; Fabio Rizzato

De De Lind was a short-lived Italian progressive rock band active in the early 1970s. The band only released one album and four singles over the five years of its existence.

== History ==
De De Lind was formed in 1969 in the northern Italian city of Varese, and was named after DeDe Lind, a popular 60s Playboy model. Beginning as a beat band, as was common at the time, they eventually evolved towards progressive rock in the early 1970s. They are primarily known for their 1973 album, Io non so da dove vengo e non so dove mai andrò. Uomo è il nome che mi han dato, one of the most disputed examples of Italian progressive rock.

== Discography ==
=== LP ===
- Io non so da dove vengo e non so dove mai andrò. Uomo è il nome che mi han dato (1973)

=== Singles ===
- Anche se sei qui / Come si fa? (1969)
- Mille anni / Ti devo lasciare (1970)
- Signore dove vai? / Torneremo ancora (1971)
- Fuga e morte / Paura del niente (1973)
