= Maneige =

- Origin: Quebec
- Genres: Progressive rock; jazz fusion; avant-pop
- Years active: 1972–1983
- Past members: Denis Lapierre; Alain Bergeron; Yves Léonard; Gilles Schetagne; Jérôme Langlois; Vincent Langlois

Maneige was a Québécois progressive rock and fusion jazz band from Quebec. The instrumental ensemble was one of the Quebec progressive rock scene's longest-running bands, performing regularly for several decades.

== History ==
Maneige was founded in 1972 by Alain Bergeron and Jérôme Langlois. Bergeron played flute and saxophone, while Langlois was a keyboardist. They were joined by drummer Gilles Schetagne, percussionist Paul Picard and bassist Yves Leonard, to form the initial quintet. The band played a few concerts in the early 1970s, opening for the Dutch progressive band, Ekseption and for Soft Machine on the 15 February 1974 at CEGEP Maisonneuve. They released their first two albums on the Harvest label. Their eponymous debut release contained a side-long track and established their experimental approach. Jerome's brother, Vincent Langlois, was added as a second keyboardist and a wind player, and an array of percussion instruments, some tuned, were used. Guitarist Denis Lapierre had been added to the lineup. In 1975, Billboard described the band as "pop avant-garde", writing that "they mix musique concrete in a style between early Zappa and Pink Floyd", and noted that the album "brought success beyond exepectations". The band signed with Capitol Records in 1974; their second album, also released in 1975, was Les Porches.

After these two initial albums, Jerome Langlois left due to differences in opinion concerning the band's musical direction, and Vincent Langlois took over sole keyboard duties. Paul Picard, from the original lineup but absent from the first two releases, rejoined the band. The next two studio albums were more focused, with shorter compositions. Ni vent... ni nouvelle and Libre Service were the next two releases, and both were reissued on CD in the early 1990s. The band toured in Canada, including a performance at the Winnipeg Heritage Festival in 1978.

A live album followed in 1979, entitled Composite. Two more albums came in the early 1980s, which were more of a jazz rock styling. In the late 1990s, Live Montreal 1974-1975 was issued featuring recordings from the early version of the band, including the side-long "Le Rafiot" from their first album, as well as the unreleased "1-2-3-4-5-6".

In 2005, ProgQuébec reissued some archive material, and issued the previously unreleased early composition "Manège".

In 2022, the original members reform the group and play a handful of shows, most notably at the Montreal International Jazz Festival on July 7, 2023.

== Discography ==
- 1975: Maneige
- 1975: Les Porches, Capitol Records, EMI Of Canada: ST 6438
- 1977: Ni Vent...Ni Nouvelle
- 1978: Libre Service - Self Service
- 1979: Composite
- 1980: Montréal, 6 am
- 1981: Images
- 1998: Live Montréal 1974-1975
- 2005: Live à l’Évêché 1975
- 2005: Live
- 2006: Les Porches Live
