= Saint Just (band) =

Saint Just was an Italian progressive rock band from Naples. They were named after French revolutionary Louis Antoine de Saint-Just. The band released two albums between 1973 and 1974. In 2011 vocalist Jane "Jenny" Sorrenti and guitarist Toni Verde reformed the band with different musicians.

== Band members ==
- Jane "Jenny" Sorrenti - vocals
- Toni Verde - guitar, bass, vocals
- Robert Fix - sax
- Tito Rinesi - guitar, vocals
- Andrea Faccenda - guitar, keyboards
- Fulvio Maras - drums, percussion

== Discography ==
Albums

- Saint Just (1973)
- La Casa del Lago (1974)
- Prog Explosion (2011)
