= Predmestje =

Yugoslav jazz rock band

- Predmestje second lineup

Background information
- Origin: Ljubljana, SR Slovenia, SFR Yugoslavia
- Genres: Jazz rock; progressive rock; instrumental rock
- Years active: 1977–1984
- Label: PGP-RTB
- Past members: Peter Gruden; Andrej Pompe; Aleksander Malahovsky; Gabriel Lah; Janez Hvale; Lado Jakša; Toni Dimnik; Marko Bitenc; Slavko Lebar; Marjan Lebar; Andrej Petković
- Website: predmestje.si

Predmestje (transl. Suburb) was a Yugoslav jazz rock band formed in Ljubljana in 1977.

The band gained prominence on the Yugoslav rock scene with the release of their debut album Brez naslov in 1977. By the time of the recording of the band's third studio album, keyboardist Andrej Pompe was the sole remaining original member, the rest of the lineup consisting of former members of another Ljubljana-based jazz rock band, Izvir. Predmestje split up in 1984, after recording four studio albums. After the disbandment of the group, Pompe formed the pop rock band Panda.

== History ==
=== 1977–1982 ===
Predmestje was formed in Ljubljana in 1977 by Peter Gruden (guitar, vocals), Andrej Pompe (keyboards), Aleksander Malahovsky (saxophone), Gabriel Lah (bass guitar) and Janez Hvale (drums). During the same year, the band released their debut jazz rock-oriented album, Brez naslov (Untitled), produced by Deče Žgur, through PGP-RTB. Most of the tracks on the album were instrumentals, and several tracks featured Gruden and Pompe on vocals. During the same year, the band won the Best Song Award on the Rock Evening of the Slovenska popevka festival for their song "Mala nočna kronika" ("A Little Night Chronicle").

In 1979 the band released their second studio album, Danes, včeraj in... (Today, Yesterday And...), produced by Jovan Adamov. The album featured new members Lado Jakša (saxophone), formerly of the band Sončna Pot (Sun Path), and Toni Dimnik (drums), formerly of the band Oko. All the songs on the album were written by Gruden and Pompe, and the album featured percussionist Uroš Šećerov as guest.

After the release of Danes, včeraj in..., the second lineup of the band split up. Andrej Pompe, remaining the sole original member, gathered a group of musicians who previously performed with another Ljubljana-based jazz rock band, Izvir. The new Predmestje lineup consisted of Andrej Pompe, vocalist and percussionist Marko Bitenc, guitarist Slavko Lebar, bass guitarist Marjan Lebar and drummer Andrej Petković. The new lineup recorded the album Hazard, produced by Čarli Novak and Braco Doblekar and released in 1980. The album featured similar jazz rock sound as their previous releases, with saxophonist Jernej Podboj as guest musician. After the album release, Predmestje often performed with singer Neca Falk as her backing band.

In 1982 Predmestje released their fourth studio album, Kamasutra. The album was released only after the cover was altered on the insistent of the band's record label, PGP-RTB. Most of the songs were composed by Pompe, with some of them featuring ska and pop influences. The album featured guest appearances by Jernej Podboj on saxophone and Boris Šuligoj on trombone

The band ended their activity in 1984.

=== Post breakup ===
In 1986 Pompe formed the pop rock band Panda, releasing nine albums with them: Ugrizni me, če upaš (Bite Me, If You Dare, 1987), V vročici noči (In the Heat of the Night, 1990), V poznih nočnih ura (In the Late Night Hours, 1994), Ecstasy (1998), Nepremagljivi (The Invincible Ones, 2000), D.O.N.S. (2005), Depandansa (Dependency, 2009), Stoletni ples (One Hundred Years Old Dance, 2016) and Daleč stran (Far Away, 2019).

Janez Hvale led the band Dvanaesto Nasprotje (Twelfth Opposite), brothers Slavko and Marjan Lebar performed with the band Morning Fire, and Andrej Petković performed with Partet. Lado Jakša made numerous appearances on albums by various artists and made a successful career in art photography.

== Discography ==
=== Studio albums ===
- Brez naslov (1977)
- Danes, včeraj in... (1979)
- Hazard (1980)
- Kamasutra (1982)
