= Moving Gelatine Plates =

- Origin: Sartrouville, France
- Genres: Progressive rock; Canterbury scene; experimental rock
- Years active: 1968-1972; 1978-1981; 2006
- Labels: CBS; AMO
- Past members: Gérard Bertram; Didier Thibault; Gérard Pons; Maurice Helmlinger

Moving Gelatine Plates was a French progressive rock and experimental rock band formed by bassist Didier Thibault and guitarist Gérard Bertram in Sartrouville in 1968. The two musicians met in 1966 as 14-year-old schoolmates. Being heavily influenced by jazz, the band is considered to be part of progressive rock's Canterbury scene in spite of its national origin. In particular, the band's sound has been compared to Soft Machine. According to Thibault, the band’s name derives from the 1962 novel Travels with Charley: In Search of America by John Steinbeck.

Drummer Gérard Pons and multi-instrumentalist Maurice Helmlinger completed the line-up for the band’s first, self-titled album which was released by CBS on 3 June 1971. Moving Gelatine Plates under the same line-up (with the addition of session wind players) released a second album with CBS in 1972 entitled The World of Genius Hans, which, like their first effort, met with little commercial success. Owing to financial problems resulting from poor sales, after releasing this album the band was soon forced to break up.

Thibault reformed the band with different members to release the album Moving in 1980 on the AMO label, shortly after which the band folded once more. The band reformed again to release a fourth album entitled Removing in 2006.

== Discography ==
- Moving Gelatine Plates (1971)
- The World of Genius Hans (1972)
- Moving (1980)
- Removing (2006)

== Filmography ==
- 2015: Romantic Warriors III: Canterbury Tales (DVD)
