= Bi Kyo Ran =

Japanese progressive rock band

- Origin: Japan
- Genre: Progressive rock
- Works: Discography
- Labels: Nexus; Belle Antique
- Website: www.bikyoran.net

Bi Kyo Ran (美狂乱, Bikyōran) is a Japanese progressive rock band founded in 1973. They gained some attention when they performed the soundtrack to Cromartie High School. They also performed the ending theme for the show, entitled "Trust Me" (however, the opening theme was by Takuro Yoshida).

Their sound is often compared with King Crimson (they started as a King Crimson tribute band) which is understandable given guitarist Kunio Suma's emulation of Robert Fripp's renowned style and some similarity in song titles ("Vision of the City", "21st Century Africa").

== Members ==
1973 1st BIKYORAN

- Kunio Suma (須磨 邦雄, Suma Kunio) - electric guitar, vocals
- Shinji Yoshinaga (吉永 伸二, Yoshinaga Shinji) - bass, vocals
- Yoshitsugu Yamada (山田 芳嗣, Yamada Yoshitsugu) - drums, vocals

1975 MADOROMI

- Kunio Suma (須磨 邦雄, Suma Kunio) - electric guitar, vocals
- Shinji Yoshinaga (吉永 伸二, Yoshinaga Shinji) - bass, vocals
- Masaaki Nagasawa (長沢 正昭, Nagasawa Masaaki) - drums

1977 2nd BIKYORAN

- Kunio Suma (須磨 邦雄, Suma Kunio) - electric guitar, vocals
- Shinji Yoshinaga (吉永 伸二, Yoshinaga Shinji) - bass, vocals
- Masaaki Nagasawa (長沢 正昭, Nagasawa Masaaki) - drums
- Masumi Kuno (久野 真澄, Kuno Masumi) - Keybd
- Takako Sugita (杉田 孝子, Sugita Takako) - violin

1978 3rd BIKYORAN

- Kunio Suma (須磨 邦雄, Suma Kunio) - electric guitar, vocals
- Shinji Yoshinaga (吉永 伸二, Yoshinaga Shinji) - bass, vocals
- Masaharu Sato (佐藤 正治, Satou Masaharu) - drums
- Masumi Kuno (久野 真澄, Kuno Masumi) - keybd
- Takako Sugita (杉田 孝子, Sugita Takako) - violin

1982 4th BIKYORAN

- Kunio Suma (須磨 邦雄, Suma Kunio) - electric guitar, vocals, mellotron
- Masaaki Nagasawa (長沢 正昭, Nagasawa Masaaki) - drums, keybd
- Masahide Shiratori (白鳥 正英, Shiratori Masahide) - bass, guitar, vocals

1995 5th BIKYORAN

- Kunio Suma (須磨 邦雄, Suma Kunio) - electric guitar, vocals
- Toshimasa Saegusa (三枝 寿雅, Saegusa Toshimasa) - bass, synth, recorder, vocals
- Akihito Suzuki (鈴木 章仁, Suzuki Akihito) - percussion, recorder, vocals
- Shunji Kageshima (影島 俊二, Kageshima Shunji) - drums, marimba, recorder, vocals
- Kotomi Otsuka (大塚 琴美, Otsuka Kotomi) - piano, synth, vocals
- Kazuya Mochizuki (望月 一矢, Mochizuki Kazuya) - acoustic guitar, electric guitar, percussion
- Masato Taguchi (田口 正人, Taguchi Masato) - percussion, timpani
- Kouji Tazawa (田沢 浩二, Tazawa Kouji) - vocal, percussion

1997 6th BIKYORAN

- Kunio Suma (須磨 邦雄, Suma Kunio) - electric guitar, vocals
- Toshimasa Saegusa (三枝 寿雅, Saegusa Toshimasa) - bass, vocals
- Yoshiyuki Shimizu (清水 禎之, Shimizu Yoshiyuki) - drums, vocals

2003 7th BIKYORAN

- Kunio Suma (須磨 邦雄, Suma Kunio) - electric guitar, vocals
- Masaaki Nagasawa (長沢正昭, Nagasawa Masaaki) - drums
- Noriyuki Kamiya (神谷 典行, Kamiya Noriyuki) - melotron, mini-moog
- Hiroaki Sakurai (桜井 弘明, Sakurai Hiroaki) - bass
- Wasei Suma (須磨 和声, Suma Wasei) - violin, viola

== Discography ==
- Wind & Wave (1978)
1. 警告 [Warning]
- 美狂乱 [Bi Kyo Ran] (1982)
1. 二重人格 [Double]
2. シンシア [Cynthia]
3. 狂パートII [Psycho part II]
4. ひとりごと [Monologue]
5. 警告 [Warning]
- Parallax (1983)
1. サイレント･ランニング [Silent Running]
2. 予言 [Prediction]
3. 組曲「乱」[Suite "Ran"]
- 御伽世界-Early Live VOL.1 [Fairy Tales] (originally recorded in 1978, released in 1987)
1. うねり [Chaos]
2. 御伽世界 [Adore This]
3. 空飛ぶコクゾウ [Anti-Grounded Kokuzo]
4. 未完成四重奏 [Unfinished Quartett]
5. 予言 [Prediction]
- 風魔 [風魔-ライブ VOL.2] [Who Ma] (originally recorded in 1983, released in 1993)
1. 都市の情景 [The City Stays]
2. ひとりごと [Monologue]
3. 狂パートII [Psycho (Part I)]
4. サイレントランニング [Silent Running]
5. ストップ･ブレイキング・センス [Stop Breaking Sense]
6. 風魔 [Who Ma]
7. インプロヴィゼーション [Improvisation]
- 乱-ライブ VOL.3 [Ran] (originally recorded in 1983, released in 1994)
1. 狂パートI [Psycho (Part I)]
2. 警告 [Warning]
3. 組曲「乱」 [Suite "Ran"]
4. 二重人格 [Double]
- まどろみ LIVE VOL.4 [Madoromi live vol.4] (originally recorded in 1975, released in 1994)
1. グレート・デシーヴァー [Great Deceiver]
2. 土曜日の本 [A Book of Saturday]
3. ナイトウォッチ [Nightwatch]
4. エグザイルス [Exiles]
5. スターレス [Starles
- 五蘊 [Go-Un] (1995)
1. 乱パートII [Ran part II]
2. 旅の果て [Journey's End]
3. おもいいれ [Omoi-ire]
4. 狂パートII－II [Psycho part II-2]
5. 21世紀のAfrica [21st Century Africa]
- Deep Live (1995)
1. 狂パートII－2 [Psycho part II-2]
2. 狂パートIII [A Violent Nightmare]
3. 乱パートII [Ran part II]
4. ディープ [Deep]
5. 21世紀のAfrica [21st Century Africa]
6. 都市の情景 [Vision of the City]
- 狂暴な音楽 [Violent Music] (1997)
1. 狂暴な街 [A Violent City]
2. 地に足 [Feet On The Ground]
3. 狂暴な宴 [A Violent Party (including op.2 "Sad Dali" movement No. 4]
4. 狂暴な砦 [A Violent Fort]
5. ひぐらし野郎 [A Man of Hand to Mouth]
6. Creep Funk [Creep Funk]
7. 狂暴な悪夢 [A Violent Nightmare]
- まどろみ・ハーデスト・ライブ '76 [Madoromi: The Hardest Live] (originally recorded in 1975, released in 2000)
1. 情景5 [Scene 5]
2. グレート・デシーヴァー [The Great Deceiver]
3. Tapes [Tapes]
4. 太陽と戦慄 Part I [Lark's Tongues in Aspic part I]
5. ワンモア・レッド・ナイトメア [One More Red Nightmare]
6. IMPROV [IMPROV]
7. イージー・マネー [Easy Money]
8. トーキング・ドラム [The Talking Drum]
9. 太陽と戦慄 Part II [Lark's Tongues in Aspic part II]
- Anthology Volume One (2002)
1. ルークウォームウォーター [Lukewarm Water]
2. 都市の情景 [The City Stays]
3. ゼンマイ仕掛け [Clockwork]
4. 御伽世界 [Adore This]
5. 未完成四重唱 [Unfinished Quartett]
6. 憧れのエーデルワイス [Edelweiss]
7. 空飛ぶコクゾウ [Anti-Grounded Kokuzo]
8. 海の情景 [The Ocean Stays]
- 魁!!クロマティ高校 OST vol.1 [Cromartie Hi School Original SoundTracks vol.1] (2004)
1. トラストミー Part I [Trust me part I]
2. 街の光 [Citylight]
3. ジェントルマインド [Gentle Mind]
4. HIGURASHI [Higurashi]
5. フレディのテーマ [theme from Freddie]
6. 激しいペールギュント [hard Peer Gynt]
7. スクエアムーン [Square Moon]
8. Life on the Earth I [Life on the Earth I]
9. メカ沢ミニマル [Mechazawa Minimal]
10. もぐら [The Mole]
11. 謎のブリッジ [Bridge ]
12. プータンのテーマ [Theme from Pu-Tang]
13. トラストミー Part I I [Trust me part II]
14. Go NorthWest Go [Go NorthWest Go]
15. アフリカカリンバ [21st Century of Africa Kalimba]
16. ピエロ [the Clown]
17. くもの糸 [The Webb]
18. Mechazawa Hi-Speed [Mechazawa Hi-Speed]
19. 即興3 [Improvisation III]
20. 眠りの淵 [an Abyss of the sleep]
21. 即興1 [Improvisation I]
22. 祈り [Holy Night]
23. トラストミー Part I I I [Trust me part III]
- 魁!!クロマティ高校 OST vol.2 [Cromartie Hi School Original SoundTracks vol.2] (2004)
1. スクエア・ムーン [Square Moon (vocal version)]
2. 祭り [the Festival]
3. 星がどっさりな夜 [Full Stardust]
4. 煽るブリッジ1 [Bridge I]
5. 即興2 [Improvisation II]
6. プータン#2 [Theme from Pu-Tang II]
7. Mechazawa Hi-Speed (カラオケ) [Mechazawa Hi-Speed Karaoke]
8. Life on the Earth 2 [Life on the Earth II]
9. 煽るブリッジ2 [Bridge II]
10. ミミズ [The Earthworms]
11. Silent [Concerto-Silent]
12. 謎のブリッジ1 [Bridge III]
13. Troy [Troy]
14. サイモトロン [Simotoron Device]
15. Concerto-Impro2 [Concerto-Improvisation]
16. 煽るブリッジ3 [Bridge IV]
17. デッドボール [Dead Ball]
18. そろそろ [Soon]
19. 警告 [Warning] 1979/5/5 Live at Silver Elephant
