= Intorno alla mia cattiva educazione =

Studio album by Alusa Fallax
- Released: 1974
- Genre: Progressive rock, Italian progressive rock
- Length: 44:39
- Label: Fonit Cetra

Intorno alla mia cattiva educazione is the first and only studio album by the Italian progressive rock band Alusa Fallax. It was released in 1974.

== Track listing ==
1. Soliloquio - 3:02
2. Non Fatemi Caso - 4:22
3. Intorno Alla Mia Cattiva Educazione - 4:14
4. Fuori di Me, Dentro di Me - 3:01
5. Riflessioni al Tramonto - 3:04
6. Il Peso delle Tradizioni - 1:40
7. Carta Carbone - 3:33
8. Perché Ho Venduto il Mio Sangue - 1:43
9. Per Iniziare una Vita - 4:20
10. È Oggi - 2:51
11. È Così Poco Quel Che Conosco - 2:55
12. Ciò Che Nasce Con Me - 4:11
13. Splendida Sensazione - 5:43

== Personnel ==
- Guido Gabet: electric & acoustic guitar, vocals.
- Massimo Parretti: piano, organ, harpsichord, ARP synthesizer.
- Mario "Giondo" Cirla: flute, saxophones, horn, vocals.
- Guido Cirla: bass, vocals.
- Augusto "Duty" Cirla: lead vocals, percussion, recorder, bells.

=== Release information ===
- LP Fonit - LPQ 09082 (1974)
- CD Mellow Records - MMP 229 (1994)
- CD BTF/Vinyl Magic VMCD 103 (2005)
