= England (band) =

British progressive rock band

- Origin: Maidstone, Kent, England
- Years active: 1975–1978, 2006
- Label: Arista Records
- Past members: Martin Henderson; Frank Holland; Jode Leigh; Robert Webb; Mark Ibbotson; Jaffa Peckham; Jamie Moses

England were a progressive rock group active in the late 1970s, and briefly reformed in 2006. The band is notable for their album Garden Shed released on Arista Records, and for keyboardist Robert Webb playing a modified half-width Mellotron.

== Biography ==
The band was formed in 1975 by drummer Mark Ibbotson, and, after a variety of prototype groups, stabilised around a line-up of himself, bassist Martin Henderson, guitarist Jamie Moses and keyboardist Robert Webb. Moses and Webb had previously collaborated on an unreleased album. Ibbottson owned a Mk II Mellotron, which Webb took an interest in, later saying "it opens up possibilities. It's having control like the conductor of an orchestra." To make the instrument portable, Webb sawed the instrument in half, rehousing the left-hand manual and the right-hand tapes (which contained the lead sounds on a Mk II model) in a new case. After a number of gigs at the Hazlitt Theatre in Maidstone, Moses quit and was replaced by Frank Holland. In March 1976, immediately following a showcase gig that resulted in a contract with Arista Records, Ibbotson quit the band and was replaced by Jode Leigh.

The band spent most of 1976 rehearsing and recording material for Arista. The single "Paraffinalea" was released in February 1977. Anne Nightingale gave a positive review of the single, saying the band was "destined for great things." This was followed by the album Garden Shed, but by this time, punk rock was popular, and this, combined with a general lack of interest in promoting the band, meant that it was a commercial failure. Melody Maker described the album as "Yes in toyland". The band split from their management and moved into a music shop in Hastings but the financial situation didn't improve and the group split in autumn 1978.

Henderson later became touring bassist for Jeff Beck, while Moses later became a touring guitarist for Queen + Paul Rodgers and Sir Tom Jones. Ibbotson became the Pretty Things' manager in 1985, while Holland joined that band as a guitarist, positions they retain to this day. The band continue to receive critical praise, with Music Mart magazine describing a CD reissue of Garden Shed "as good as prog could get in the '70s." Webb and Henderson reactivated the band in 2006 for a brief tour, including an appearance at the Baja Prog Fest in Mexicali. In March 2019, three of the original members, Webb, Henderson and Holland, along with Jordan Brown, Russ Wilson, Andy Thompson and several members from prog band The Gift (Mike Morton, Dave Lloyd & Gabriele Baldocci), performed a one-off reunion gig at Fusion Festival 2 in Stourport. This performance also featured a brief vocal performance from the band's original drummer, Jode Leigh.

== Discography ==
=== Studio albums ===
- Garden Shed (1977)
- The Last of the Jubblies (1997)
- Box of Circles (2017)

=== Singles & EPs ===
- The Imperial Hotel (EP) (1975)
- "Victoriana" b/w "Hearts Made of Glass" (1983), Jet Records
- "London Story" b/w "Under the Pier" (1984), Jet Records

=== Live albums ===
- Live in Japan: Kikimimi (2006)
