= Crack (band) =

Spanish band

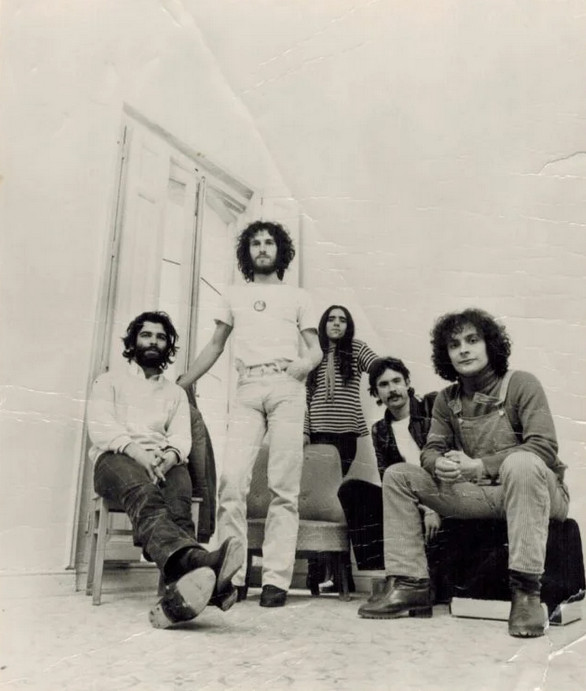
- Crack, 1979.

Background information
- Origin: Gijón, Spain
- Genres: Progressive rock Symphonic rock
- Years active: 1977–1980
- Labels: Chapa/Zafiro; Sony BMG
- Members: Mento Hevia; Vidal Antón; Alberto Fontaneda; Álex Cabal; Manolo Jiménez; Rafael Rodríguez; Tor; Óscar
- Website: crack.band

Crack was a Spanish progressive and symphonic rock band formed in 1977 and disbanded in March 1980. They were part of the wave of progressive and symphonic rock acts that defined the peak of Spanish progressive rock. During this period, many bands —including Crack— struggled financially as they prioritized artistic integrity over the commercial demands of radio. Challenges such as inadequate sound equipment, changing audience preferences, industry and label constraints, and occasional internal disagreements all contributed to the group's breakup.

== History ==
Crack was established in 1977 and began as a four-member group without an electric guitar. Toward the end of that year, Mento Hevia, together with original bassist Vidal Antón and Manolo Jiménez, reconnected with Alberto Fontaneda, a former university classmate from Oviedo, where both Hevia and Fontaneda had studied law. While working on "Marchando una del Cid," they were searching for a singer and a flutist. The initial lineup quickly began rehearsing and played concerts whenever they were able to secure bookings. Eventually, the band's sound became fuller and more dynamic with the addition of Rafael Rodríguez on guitar and, later, the amicable replacement of Vidal by Alex Cabal on bass.

== Album ==
Crack's sole album, Si Todo Hiciera Crack (rgh. "If Everything Fell Apart"), was recorded in five days at Audiofilm Studios in Madrid and released by the Chapa Discos label. Singer Encarnación González, known as "Cani," contributed female vocals to the album, supporting Alberto Fontaneda on several tracks.

According to the album credits, Crack—the band itself—handled the musical production. The budget for promoting Si Todo Hiciera Crack was almost nonexistent, as the record company had chosen to invest in safer, more commercial genres. Meanwhile, the new wave movement, known in Spain as 'La Movida,' was gaining momentum. Although recognized for its symphonic and progressive rock compositions, the album did not achieve notable commercial success at the time.

The band disbanded in 1980 due to internal conflicts, economic problems, and difficulties in maintaining the project. The album features seven tracks that blend symphonic elements, Spanish influences, and progressive rock styles. With few choruses, nearly every track unfolds like a story you'd find in a fable. Each lyric is infused with elements of fantasy and myth.

- Descenso en el Mahëllstrom ('A Descent into the Maelström') (5:27): Inspired by Edgar Allan Poe's short story, this track portrays a man's struggle to survive a shipwreck caught in a massive whirlpool.
- Amantes de la Irrealidad ('Lovers of the Unreal') (6:15): A symphonic piece with tempo shifts, Mellotron sections, intense guitar passages, and a mix of male vocals and keyboards whose lyrics express a pursuit of happiness through an idealistic and utopian lens.
- Cobarde o Desertor ('Coward or Deserter')(4:56):A song addressing conscription, militarism, and war, illustrating the reality faced by many young people at the time who were subject to compulsory enlistment.
- Buenos Deseos ('Good wishes') (3:54): A short track with a contemplative tone.
- Marchando Una del Cid ('One more story about el Cid coming up') (7:45): An epic composition with medieval influences, this song draws inspiration from the exile and final days of Rodrigo Díaz de Vivar, known as El Cid —a legendary Spanish hero and the central figure in Cantar de mio Cid, the most renowned medieval epic poem in Spanish literature.
- Si Todo Hiciera Crack ('If everything fell apart) (10:11): The title track uses the story of a hamster endlessly running in circles as an allegory to explore existential themes.
- Epílogo (2:19) ('Epilogue')

== Musical style ==
Primarily instrumental, Crack's music can be classified as symphonic progressive rock, distinguished by intricate compositions that avoid repetitive choruses in favor of continuous musical evolution. The seamless interaction between instruments creates a rich and engaging soundscape, merging European prog rock influences with a distinctly Spanish essence.

Their music features keyboards, guitar, and flute, drawing inspiration from bands such as Genesis, Camel and Jethro Tull while also incorporating Spanish musical elements. Crack's most significant formal characteristics resemble those of classic European progressive-symphonic rock bands, with a predominance of long instrumental interludes, irregular meters, and distinctive timbres and synthesizer effects.

The band favored melody and interpretive nuance, with frequent references to freedom and bucolic themes in their lyrics. When describing their music, the group often used the term "impressionist" and cited the harmonic influence of composers such as Debussy and Ravel.

== Legacy ==
Although Crack's career was brief, their album remains a cornerstone of Spanish progressive rock. It has been reissued multiple times in countries like Japan and South Korea due to its enduring popularity among prog rock enthusiasts. The band is remembered for their creativity and contribution to the genre during a challenging era for progressive music in Spain.

== Band members ==
- Alberto Fontaneda: Vocals, guitar and flute.
- Mento Hevia : Keyboards and vocals.
- Alex Cabal: Bass.
- Manolo Jimenez: Drums.
- Rafael Rodriguez: Guitar.
