= Den Za Den =

Yugoslav jazz rock group

- Den Za Den in 1980, from left to right: Dmitar Čočorovski, Dragiša Soldatović, Arian Dema and Vladimir Jankulovski

Background information
- Origin: Skopje, SR Macedonia, SFR Yugoslavia
- Genres: Jazz rock; instrumental rock; folk rock
- Years active: 1978–1980
- Labels: ZKP RTLJ
- Past members: Dragiša Soldatović; Vladimir Jankulovski; Dmitar Čočorovski; Siniša Stojanovski; Arian Dema

Den Za Den (Macedonian: Ден За Ден; trans. Day After Day) was a Yugoslav jazz rock group formed in Skopje in 1978. Although short-lived, the band was one of the most notable representatives of the Yugoslav jazz rock scene.

== Band history ==
=== 1978–1980 ===
Den Za Den was formed in January 1978. The first lineup of the band featured Dragiša Soldatović "Labiš" (keyboards, formerly of the band Skrb), Vladimir Jankulovski (bass guitar), Dmitar Čočorovski (drums) and Siniša Stojanovski (guitar). During the year, the band made their first recordings, recording the songs "Letna ljubov" ("Summer Love") and "Taka treba" ("That's the Way") for RTV Skopje. In October of the same year, Stojanovski was replaced by Arijan Dema (a former member of the band Pu), and in December 1978, they appeared on the last edition of the BOOM Festival. In 1979, they appeared on the Subotica Youth Festival and on the Rock Evening of Opatija Festival. The songs "Ciganka" ("Gypsy") and "Vodopad" ("Waterfall") which they performed at the Opatija Festival appeared on the various artists album Opatija '79 – Rock grupe (Opatija '79 – Rock Bands) during the same year.

In 1980, the band released their debut album, produced by Ivo Umek and entitled simply Den Za Den. During the same year, the band once again performed on Opatija Festival, their song "Jutro i noć" ("Morning and Night") appearing on the various artists album JRT – Opatija '80 – Rock veče (JRT – Opatija '80 – Rock Evening). The band also appeared on the 1980 Jazz Fair festival in Zagreb, their song "Den za den" appearing on the double live album Jazz Fair / Sajam jazza, recorded on the festival. However, at the time of the expansion of the Yugoslav new wave scene, Den Za Den saw little attention of the media, and the band ended their activity shortly after, having their last performance in November 1980 on the FAMUS festival in Sivac.

=== Post breakup ===
Dragiša Soldatović "Labiš" and Dimtrije Čočorovski formed the latin jazz group Paskvelija, however, Čočorovski left the band only several months after the formation to join the newly-formed Avtograf (Autograph). Soldatović led Paskvelija until 1985, when the group disbanded. In 1995, Soldatović formed the jazz group Labish Trio with Zoran Pavlovski (bass guitar) and Kokan Dimuševski (drums). They released their debut album, entitled Labish Trio, in 1996. In 1998, Labish Trio recorded their second album, Dream, in the lineup that featured Soldatović on piano, Darko Mučov on bass guitar and Goce Stefkovski on drums. Soldatović died on 22 March 2008.

Arian Dema joined the short-lasting group Izlez (Exit), formed in 1981 by former Leb i Sol members Kokan Dimuševski and Garabet Tavitjan. After Izlez disbanded in 1982, he recorded several of his own songs but soon retired from the Yugoslav scene. During the late 1980s, he performed in clubs across Europe with the band Fireball. He died on 24 June 2016.

After Den za Den disbanded, Vladimir Jankulovski retired from music.

== Discography ==
=== Studio albums ===
- Den Za Den (1980)

=== Other appearances ===
- "Ciganka" (Opatija '79 – Rock grupe, 1979)
- "Jutro i noć" (JRT – Opatija '80 – Rock veče, 1980)
- "Den za den" (Jazz Fair / Sajam jazza, 1980)
