= Oko (band) =

Slovenian rock band

Background information
- Origin: Ljubljana, SR Slovenia, SFR Yugoslavia
- Genres: Hard rock; progressive rock; jazz rock
- Years active: 1972–1978 (Reunions: 2000)
- Labels: ZKP RTLJ, Jugoton
- Past members: Pavle Kavec; Jani Tutta; Miro Tomassini; Dejan Gajić; Toni Dimnik; Franjo Martinec; Zlati Klun; Igor Bošnjak; Ernie Mendillo

Oko (trans. Eye) was a Slovenian and Yugoslav hard/progressive rock band formed in Ljubljana in 1972. Formed and led by guitarist and vocalist Pavle Kavec, Oko was a prominent act of the Yugoslav rock scene in the 1970s.

== Band history ==
=== 1972–1978 ===
Guitarist and vocalist Pavle Kavec started his career in 1966, while he was still in elementary school, playing with the band Rož'ce (Lil' Roses), performing with them on the Zagreb Guitar Festival. In 1967, influenced by the works of Jimi Hendrix, Kavec formed the power trio Yeti Experience, featuring Kavec on guitar and vocals, Miran Bulič on bass guitar and Borut Sedej on drums. In 1971, Kavec moved to the band Skarabeji (The Scarabs), whose sound was inspired by Deep Purple.

In 1972, Kavec formed Oko with drummer Jani Tutta and bass guitarist Miro Tomassini, the latter previously a member of the band Boomerang. They adopted the name Oko after a suggestion by fellow musician Janez Bončina. Initially, Oko performed hard rock, but later started to move towards progressive rock and introduce jazz elements into their music.

In 1973, Tutta was replaced by Dejan Gajić. The new Oko lineup made their first recordings, for Radio Ljubljana. In 1975, Gajić and Tomassini both moved to the band Jutro, drummer Toni Dimnik and bass guitarist Franjo Martinec becoming new Oko members. This lineup of the band recorded the band's debut release, the 7-inch single "Vse dal sam ti" / "Spet nazaj" ("I Gave You All" / "Back Again"), released in 1975 through Jugoton record label. This lineup of the band also recorded the material for their first studio album. All the songs were written by Kavec, with the exception of the instrumental "Tema IV", composed by Martinec. The lyrics for the song "Sam sam" ("I Am Alone") were written by Dah frontman Zlatko Manojlović, who also appeared on the track as guest vocalist. The album was produced by Dečo Žgur, and it featured guest appearances by Izvir keyboardist Andrej Konjajev and percussionist Miha Vipotnik. However, Oko disbanded a year later, before releasing the album, as Dimnik moved to Buldožer and Martinec decided to dedicate himself to his studies. Kavec re-recorded the vocals with new lyrics in Serbo-Croatian (they were originally in Slovene) and released the album in 1976 under the name Raskorak (Gap) through Jugoton record label. At the time of Raskorak release, Oko was inactive, and Kavec was playing with the band Boomerang.

At the end of 1976, Kavec reformed Oko with drummer Zlati Klun and bass guitarist Igor Bošnjak. They performed until 1978, when Oko disbanded, making several one-off reunions in the following years for anniversary concerts.

=== Post breakup, 2000 reformation ===
After Oko disbanded, Kavec mostly retired from performing, dedicating himself to his school of guitar. However, in the early 1990s he returned to the scene with his solo album Hočeš z menoj (Wanna Come With Me), which he recorded with his son Mitja Kavec on bass guitar and his former bandmate from Oko Dragan Gajić on drums.

In 1998, Max Plus record label reissued Raskorak on CD, with the band's early recordings as bonus tracks. This re-release led to reformation of Oko. The new lineup featured Pavle Kavec (guitar, vocals), Ernie Mendillo (bass guitar) and Klemen Markelj (drums). On their performance in the Hound Dog club in Ljubljana they recorded the live album Oko (Live December 2000), which they self-released in 2001. The album featured only one Oko song, "Raskorak", and covers of rock hits from the 1960s.

Oko's original bass guitarist Miro Tomassini died on 21 August 2019.

== Discography ==
=== Studio albums ===
- Raskorak (1976)

=== Live albums ===
- Oko (Live December 2000) (2001)

=== Singles ===
- "Vse sam dal ti" / "Spet nazaj" (1975)
