= Jutro (Ljubljana band) =

Yugloslav rock band

- Jutro in 1976

Background information
- Origin: Ljubljana, SR Slovenia, SFR Yugoslavia
- Genres: Boogie rock; jazz rock; progressive rock
- Years active: 1970–early 1980s
- Labels: PGP-RTB, ZKP RTLJ
- Past members: Zoran Crnković; Miro Tomassini; Dragan Gajić; Alan Jakin; Lado Jakša; Pavle Ristić; Jordan Gančev

Jutro (trans. Morning) was a Yugoslav rock band formed in Ljubljana in 1970. Initially performing boogie rock and later turning towards jazz rock, Jutro was a prominent act on the Yugoslav rock scene in the 1970s.

== History ==
=== 1970–early 1980s ===
Jutro was officially formed on 27 December 1970, in Ljubljana. The band was formed by Zoran Crnković (guitar, vocals), Miro Tomassini (bass guitar), and Dragan Gajić (drums). The band had their debut performance only several days after the official formation, on the New Year's Eve concert in Ljubljana's Tivoli Hall. The three forming members were later joined by guitarist Alan Jakin (formerly of the band Era).

Initially, Jutro performed boogie rock but also covered classical pieces. Their version of Mozart's Eine kleine Nachtmusik appeared on the live album Boom Pop Fest '73, recorded at the 1973 BOOM Festival held in Tivoli Hall. The band performed on the 1974 edition of the festival, also held in Tivoli Hall, the recording of their song "Tarantela" ("Tarantella") appearing on the double live album Boom Pop Festival Ljubljana '74. During the 1970s, the band held a great number of live concerts and released a 7-inch single with the songs "Prema suncu" ("Towards the Sun") and "Mozart" through PGP-RTB, but failed to gain the attention of the media.

In 1978, they were joined by saxophonist Lado Jakša, drummer Pavle Ristić (formerly of Srce), and Bulgarian keyboardist Jordan Gančev. The new lineup of Jutro turned towards jazz rock. In 1980, they released their only studio album, entitled Dobro jutro (Good Morning), through ZKP RTLJ. The album featured songs authored by Crnković and a cover of the traditional song "Po jezeru" ("On the Lake"). Released at the time of the expansion of the Yugoslav new wave scene, the album was not well received by Yugoslav music critics, who described its sound as démodé. After the album's release, Jutro spent a couple of years performing mostly in Slovenian clubs before disbanding in the early 1980s.

=== Post breakup ===
After Jutro disbanded, Dragan Gajić performed with the band Oko, and later moved to Tone Janša Quartet, recording the album Woody Shaw with Tone Jansa Quartet (1985) with the group. As a member of Pečenko Trio he took part in the recording of their albums Persepolis (1986) and Pečenko Trio (1988).

Pavle Ristić performed with the bands Hazard, F+ and Deja Vu. He died on 5 December 2006.

Alan Jakin joined Avtomobili in 1988. He died on 16 April 2018.

Miro Tomassini died on 21 August 2019.

== Discography ==
=== Studio albums ===
- Dobro jutro (1980)

=== Singles ===
- "Prema suncu" / "Mozzart" (1976)

=== Other appearances ===
- "Mala nočna glasba" (Boom Pop Fest '73, 1973)
- "Tarantela" (Boom Pop Festival Ljubljana '74, 1974)
