= Melos (disambiguation) =

Milos or Melos is an island in Greece, known in history for the Battle of Melos in 415 BC.

Melos may also refer to:

- MELOS (Mars Exploration of Life and Organism Search), proposed Japanese Mars exploration mission
- Melos (album), a 1973 album by Cervello
- Melos (Acarnania), a village of ancient Acarnania, Greece
- Groupe Melos, formed in 1950 by Anne Terrier Laffaille and Robert Caby
- Melos Ensemble, London-based classical chamber music group 1950-present
- Melos Quartet, German string quartet 1965-2005
- Melus (mythology), three Greek mythological figures
- Melos, a 2008 album by Vassilis Tsabropoulos

== See also ==
- Run, Melos! (走れメロス, Hashire Merosu), a Japanese short story by Osamu Dazai
- Tera Melos Sacramento band
