= Ad gloriam =

Studio album by Le Orme
- Released: 1969
- Recorded: Late 1968
- Genre: Beat, Psychedelic rock, Progressive rock
- Length: 35:36
- Label: CAR Juke Box
- Producer: Tony Tasinato

Le Orme chronology
Ad gloriam (1969)	Collage (1970)

Professional ratings
Review scores
Source	Rating
Allmusic	3/5 stars

Ad gloriam is the first album by the Italian rock band Le Orme. Released in 1969, the album's sound differs significantly from the progressive rock that Le Orme would become known for, having more of a beat and psychedelic rock feel. The record was released on Carlo Alberto Rossi's Milan-based CAR Juke Box label.

One of the songs included on the album, "Senti l'estate che torna", had previously competed in 1968 on Un disco per l'estate, a televised music competition run by the Italian Phonographic Association in collaboration with Radiotelevisione Italiana, finishing in the top 24 of 56 songs.

Another song, "Ad Gloriam", was remixed by Irish DJ David Holmes for his 2000 album Bow Down to the Exit Sign, under the name "69 Police". It was then re-used in the Ocean's Eleven soundtrack, where it features prominently in the final scene.

== Track listing ==
All music by Aldo Tagliapietra unless otherwise noted. All lyrics by Nino Smeraldi.

=== Side one ===
1. "Introduzione" – 1:45
2. "Ad gloriam" – 5:31
3. "Oggi verrà" – 2:32
4. "Milano 1968" – 3:12
5. "I miei sogni" – 3:00

=== Side two ===
1. "Mita Mita" – 2:53 (music: Luciano Zotti)
2. "Fumo" – 3:39
3. "Senti l'estate che torna" – 2:47 (music: Italo Salizzato, Giuseppe Damele)
4. "Fiori di giglio" – 3:07
5. "Non so restare solo" – 5:28
6. "Conclusione" – 1:42

== Personnel ==
- Aldo Tagliapietra — lead vocals, acoustic guitar, flute, celesta
- Nino Smeraldi — lead guitar, sarangi, backing vocals
- Claudio Galieti — bass guitar, cello, backing vocals
- Tony Pagliuca — organ, harpsichord, electric piano
- Michi Dei Rossi — drums, timpani, bongos, tambourine
