= Homo homini lupus (disambiguation) =

Homo homini lupus is a Latin phrase meaning "man is a wolf to another man".

Homo homini lupus may also refer to:

- Homo homini lupus (album), by Locanda delle Fate (2009)
- "Homo Homini Lupis", an episode from the first season of Law & Order: Criminal Intent
