= Collage (Le Orme album) =

Studio album by Le Orme
- Released: 1971
- Recorded: 1971
- Genre: Progressive rock
- Length: 34:38
- Label: Philips
- Producer: Gian Piero Reverberi

Le Orme chronology
Ad Gloriam (1969)	Collage (1971)	Uomo di pezza (1972)

Professional ratings
Review scores
Source	Rating
AllMusic	3/5 stars

Collage is an album by the Italian progressive rock band Le Orme. It was released in 1971. It is the first progressive-like album by the band, who had previously recorded only the beat-oriented Ad Gloriam of 1968.

== Songs ==
The album begins with the instrumental "Collage", then continues with the sad song "Era inverno" ("It Was Winter"), a conversation between a man and a harlot. The third song, "Cemento armato" ("Reinforced Concrete"), is introduced by piano and describes the situation in the cities. "Sguardo verso il cielo" ("Glance Toward the Sky") was released as a single in 1971. "Evasione totale" is very near to experimental rock, as "Immagini" is near to psychedelic rock. "Morte di un fiore" ("Death of a Flower") concludes the album.

== Track listing ==
- All songs written by Tony Pagliuca and Aldo Tagliapietra.

Side 1

1. "Collage" - 4:49
2. "Era inverno" - 5:05
3. "Cemento armato" - 7:13

Side 2

4. "Sguardo verso il cielo" - 4:19
5. "Evasione totale" - 7:01
6. "Immagini" - 3:03
7. "Morte di un fiore" - 3:05

== Personnel ==
- Tony Pagliuca – keyboards
- Aldo Tagliapietra – voice, bass, guitars
- Michi Dei Rossi – drums, percussion

== Releases ==
- CD Collage Philips / Universal Distribution 1990
- CD Collage Philips 2004
- CD Collage Universal Distribution 2004
- CD Collage Universal Distribution 2007
- CD Collage Universal Distribution / Universal Japan 2010
- Digi Collage Mercury / Strategic Marketing 2010
