= Banco (Banco del Mutuo Soccorso album) =

Studio album by Banco del Mutuo Soccorso
- Released: 1975
- Studio: Chantalain, Rome; AIR Studios, London
- Genre: Progressive rock
- Length: 47:24
- Label: Manticore, Escoteric
- Producer: Vittorio Nocenzi

Banco del Mutuo Soccorso chronology
Io sono nato libero (1973)	Banco (1975)	Garofano rosso (1976)

Professional ratings
Review scores
Source	Rating
AllMusic	1.5/5 stars

Banco, also informally known as Banco IV, is the fourth studio album by Italian progressive rock band Banco del Mutuo Soccorso (at that time known simply as Banco).

The album was originally released in 1975 on the Manticore Records label launched by Emerson, Lake & Palmer.

== Background ==
The album was released in 1975 with the songs translated into English by the American musician Marva Jan Marrow.

Of the seven tracks, only "Chorale (Traccia's Theme)" and "L'albero del pane (The Bread Tree)" were unreleased. The remaining five were re-recorded from the band's self-titled debut and their previous studio album Io sono nato libero:

- "Metamorphosis" was originally released as "Metamorfosi" in Banco del Mutuo Soccorso.
- "Outside" was released as "R.I.P. (Requiescant in pace)" in Banco del Mutuo Soccorso.
- "Leave Me Alone" was released as "Non mi rompete" in Io sono nato libero.
- "Nothing's the Same" was released as "Dopo...niente è più lo stesso" in Io sono libero.
- "Traccia II", which is an instrumental track, was released under the same title in Io sono libero.

The album was recorded between Rome and London and distributed by Motown.

== Re-releases ==
In 2010 a re-mastered edition of the album was released on CD, as part of a wider re-release of albums in the Manticore catalogue. The music was remastered by Ben Wiseman at The Audio Archiving Company.

In 2011 the album was re-released by Esoteric Recordings.

== Track listing ==
All lyrics are written by Francesco Di Giacomo and Vittorio Nocenzi; all music is composed by V. Nocenzi.

Side one
No.	Title	Original release	Length
1.	"Chorale (from Traccia's Theme)" (instrumental)	Unreleased	2:30
2.	"L'albero del pane (The Bread Tree)"	Unreleased	4:45
3.	"Metamorphosis"	Banco del Mutuo Soccorso	14:54
Total length:			22:09

All lyrics are written by Di Giacomo and V. Nocenzi; English lyrics for "Leave Me Alone" and Nothing's the Same" by Marva Jan Marrow; all music is composed by V. Nocenzi.

Side two
No.	Title	Original release	Length
1.	"Outside"	Banco del Mutuo Soccorso	7:42
2.	"Leave Me Alone"	Io sono nato libero	5:20
3.	"Nothing's the Same"	Io sono nato libero	9:58
4.	"Traccia II" (instrumental)	Io sono nato libero	2:24
Total length:			25:24

== Personnel ==
=== Musicians ===
- Pier Luigi Calderoni - drums and percussion
- Vittorio Nocenzi - organ, synthesizers, electronic strings
- Renato D'Angelo - bass guitar, acoustic guitar
- Rodolfo Maltese - electric guitar, acoustic guitar, trumpet, backing vocals
- Gianni Nocenzi - grand piano, clarinet and synthesizer
- Francesco Di Giacomo - lead vocals

=== Technical ===
- Produced by Vittorio Nocenzi
- Recorded and mixed by Martin Rushent and Andy Hendricksen
- Recorded at Chatalain Studios (Rome) and AIR Studios (London)
- Mixed at Advision and AIR Studios
