= Nova (Italian band) =

Rock Band

- Origin: Naples, Italy
- Genres: Progressive rock, jazz rock
- Years active: 1975–1978
- Labels: Arista
- Past members: Elio D'Anna; Danilo Rustici; Corrado Rustici; Luciano Milanese; Franco "Dede" Lo Previte; Renato Rosset; Percy Jones; Narada Michael Walden; Phil Collins; Morris Pert; Zakir Hussain; Barry Johnson; Ric Parnell

Nova was an Italian progressive rock band that was formed in 1975 from members of the bands Osanna and Cervello. Based in London for most of their career, they released four albums that were influenced by the 1970s jazz fusion styles of bands such as Mahavishnu Orchestra, Weather Report, and Return to Forever.

== History ==
The band was formed when the founding members of Osanna, Elio D'Anna (saxophone and flute) and Danilo Rustici (guitar), were joined by Danilos’ 17-year-old brother, Corrado Rustici (guitar and vocals) from Cervello. They were joined by Luciano Milanese (bass) and Dede Lo Previte (drums) from Circus 2000.

Their first album, Blink, was released in 1976 and has a strong English progressive rock influence. It became the only recording by the band to be released in Italy. Following the departure and return to Italy of three band members, D'Anna and Corrado formed a new line-up with New Trolls Atomic System keyboardist Renato Rosset. Having started with a strong progressive influence, the band now moved towards a jazz-fusion sound. The second album, Vimana, was recorded with a number of distinguished guest musicians, including Mahavishnu Orchestra drummer Narada Michael Walden, Genesis/Brand X drummer Phil Collins and Brand X bass player Percy Jones.

The band completed their line-up with two new members: Barry Johnson on bass and vocals, and former Atomic Rooster and Ibis drummer Ric Parnell. They went on to record Wings of Love in 1977. The band moved to the USA for their final album, Sun City, which was released in 1978. Following this recording, D'Anna returned to Italy, where he became a producer. Rustici also went on to a successful career as a musician and producer, collaborating with many famous artists such as Zucchero and Whitney Houston. Johnson went on to join Lenny White's group Twennynine, while Parnell featured in the 1984 film This is Spinal Tap.

== Discography ==
- Blink (1976)
- Vimana (1976)
- Wings of Love (1977)
- Sun City (1978)

== See also ==
- Il Balletto di Bronzo
- Il Banco del Mutuo Soccorso
- La Locanda delle Fate
- Le Orme
- La Premiata Forneria Marconi
- Il Rovescio della Medaglia
