= Io sono nato libero =

Studio album by Banco del Mutuo Soccorso
- Released: 1973
- Recorded: October 1973
- Genre: Italian progressive rock
- Length: 40:42
- Label: Ricordi
- Producer: Sandro Colombini

Banco del Mutuo Soccorso chronology
Darwin! (1972)	Io sono nato libero (1973)	Banco (1975)

Professional ratings
Review scores
Source	Rating
Allmusic	link

Io sono nato libero (translated from Italian to "I Was Born Free") is the third studio album by Italian progressive rock band Banco del Mutuo Soccorso. "Non mi rompete" and "La città sottile" were released as singles in 1973. In 2015, Rolling Stone ranked the album number 35 on their list of the "50 Greatest Prog Rock Albums of All Time".

Original issues were die cut.

== Track listing ==
Music by Vittorio Nocenzi except (3) by Gianni Nocenzi. Lyrics by Francesco Di Giacomo and Vittorio Nocenzi.

Side one
No.	Title	Length
1.	"Canto nomade per un prigioniero politico (Nomad chant for a political prisoner)"	15:46
2.	"Non mi rompete (Don't bother me)"	5:09

Side two
No.	Title	Length
1.	"La città sottile (The subtle town)"	7:13
2.	"Dopo...niente è più lo stesso (Then...nothing is still the same)"	9:55
3.	"Traccia II (Track II)"	2:39

== Personnel ==
- Vittorio Nocenzi – Organ, synths, spinet
- Gianni Nocenzi – Piano, electric piano
- Marcello Todaro – Electric guitar, acoustic guitar
- Renato D'Angelo – bass, acoustic guitar
- Pier Luigi Calderoni – drums, percussion
- Francesco Di Giacomo – vocals

== Guest musicians ==
- Rodolfo Maltese – Acoustic and electric guitar
- Silvana Aliotta – Percussion
- Bruno Perosa – Percussion
