= Il Rovescio della Medaglia =

- Origin: Rome, Italy
- Genre: Progressive rock
- Years active: 1970-1977; 1993–present

Il Rovescio della Medaglia, or RDM, were an Italian hard rock and symphonic rock band. They are most famous for their symphonic rock piece Contaminazione, released in 1973. It contained four pieces from Bach's Well-tempered Clavier seamlessly integrated with RDM's own music, which often was inspired by rock or hard rock. In 1974 the record was released in an English version, Contamination, with the group's name simplified to RDM, although still written in full on the back of the LP jacket.

The band was produced by Luis Enríquez Bacalov.

The band split up in 1977, but reformed in 1993.

== Personnel ==
As listed on Contamination:

- Gino Campoli - percussives
- Enzo Vita - guitar
- Stefano Urso - bass
- Franco di Sabbatino - keyboard
- Pino Ballarini - vocals

== Discography ==
- La Bibbia (1971)
- Io come io (1972)
- Contaminazione (1973)
- Contamination (English version of Contaminazione, 1975)
- Giudizio avrai (1988)
- Vitae (1993)
- Il Ritorno (1995)

== CD releases ==
- Contaminazione

South Korea, Si-Wan Records SRMC 1002, 1992. Booklet in Korean and (original) Italian.

== See also ==
- Italian progressive rock
- Il Balletto di Bronzo
- Il Banco del Mutuo Soccorso
- I Cervello
- La Locanda delle Fate
- Le Orme
- Osanna
- Nova
- La Premiata Forneria Marconi

=== Italian progressive LPs re-recorded in English ===
- Felona e Sorona by Le Orme
- Per un amico by Premiata Forneria Marconi
- L'isola di niente by Premiata Forneria Marconi
- Maxophone by Maxophone

== Sources ==
- Paolo Barotto (1989). Il ritorno del pop italiano. Luserna San Giovanni: Stilgraf.
- Cesare Rizzi, ed. (1993). Enciclopedia del rock italiano. Milano: Arcana. ISBN 88-7966-022-5.
- Alessandro Bolli (1998). Dizionario dei Nomi Rock. Padova: Arcana editrice. ISBN 978-88-7966-172-0.
- Alessandro Gaboli e Giovanni Ottone (2007). Frazz (ed.). Progressive italiano. Firenze-Milano: Giunti. ISBN 978-88-09-04794-5.
