= Il Castello di Atlante =

- Origin: Italy
- Genres: Progressive rock
- Years active: 1974–present
- Labels: Ænima Recordings
- Members: Aldo Bergamini; Andrea Bertino; Davide Cristofoli; Dino Fiore; Paolo Ferrarotti; Mattia Garimanno
- Website: ilcastellodiatlante.it

Il Castello di Atlante ("Atlas' Castle") is an Italian progressive rock band based in Vercelli. Although the band was founded in 1974, it released its debut album in the early 1990s. It has since released 9 albums.

== History ==
The band was founded in 1974; its name was originally "Hydra", later changed into "Stato d'Allarme" and then, in 1974 in "Il Castello di Atlante". The original personnel included Aldo Bergamini (guitars, keyboards and vocals), Massimo Di Lauro (violin, keyboards), Giampiero Marchiori (flute), Dino Fiore (bass guitar), and Paolo Ferrarotti (drums, vocals). The band played live in several locations in Italy, and survived despite no released albums and frequent personnel changes, whereby only Bergamini, Fiore and Ferrarotti remained of the original personnel.

In the early 1990s, they signed for Vinyl Magic, a minor label specialized in progressive rock that at the time was republishing rare albums by many Italian progressive rock bands of the 1970s. Il Castello di Atlante's debut album, Sono io il signore delle terre a nord ("I am the lord of the northern lands", 1992) had good reception by both specialized magazines and progressive rock fans.

In 1994 the band released two CDs: a compilation of recordings from the 1970s, Passo dopo passo ("Step by step") and a studio album with new material, L'ippogrifo ("The hippogriff"). In 2000s (decade) they signed for another label, Electromantic Music, releasing 4 more albums: Come il seguitare delle stagioni (2001), Quintessenza (2004), Concerto acustico (2006) and Cap. 7 - Tra Le Antiche Mura (2008).

Since 2005 the band has been taking part in the most important progressive festivals all over the world.

In 2011 the DVD Una sera a Tokyo ("A night in Tokyo"), recorded live in Tokyo during the Japan Tour 2008, was published. This was the first production made by the band.

In 2014 the Mexican label Azafran Media published the double CD/DVD Cap. 8 - Live

Il Castello di Atlante signed with the Italian independent label Ænima Recordings, through which they released their 40th anniversary album "Arx Atlantis".

To celebrate the 25th anniversary of the release of the first CD, the Castle decided to produce a new CD containing the same tracks as the debut album, rearranged and re-recorded with the current training, plus a "bonus track". The new CD, produced by the Ænima Recordings label, came out on 13 October 2018 with the title "Siamo Noi i Signori delle Terre a Nord" ("We Are the Lords of the Northern Lands") and was officially presented in Milan at "La Casa di Alex" the same day.

== Personnel ==
- Aldo Bergamini – guitar, vocals
- Andrea Bertino – violin
- Davide Cristofoli – keyboards
- Dino Fiore – bass
- Paolo Ferrarotti – keyboards, vocals
- Mattia Garimanno – drums

=== Former members ===
From 1975 to 1982 the lineup of the band was Aldo Bergamini, Massimo Di Lauro, Paolo Ferrarotti, Giampiero Marchiori (flute) and Dino Fiore (bass guitar). From 2001 to 2007 Franco Fava temporarily replaced Fiore. In 2010 Mattia Garimanno joined the band as a drummer.

In 2014 Andrea Bertino replaced Massimo on violin. Andrea is a classical violin player graduated at G. Verdi conservatory in Milan. He has an intense concert activity and collaborates with the popular Rondò Veneziano orchestra.

After a short collaboration with the historical keyboard player Tony Pagliuca (Le Orme) in 2015, Davide Cristofoli joined the band as definitive keyboard player.

== Discography ==
- Sono io il signore delle terre a nord (Vinyl Magic 1992)
- Passo dopo passo (compilation of unreleased material, Vinyl Magic 1994)
- L'ippogrifo (Vinyl Magic 1994)
- Come il seguitare delle stagioni (Electromantic Music 2001)
- Quintessenza (Electromantic Music, 2004)
- Concerto acustico (Electromantic Music, 2006)
- Capitolo 7 - Tra Le Antiche Mura (Electromantic Music, 2008)
- Una Sera a Tokyo DVD (Ænima Recordings, 2011)
- Cap. 8: Live (Ænima Recordings, 2014)
- Cap. 8 - Live DVD+CD (Azafran Media, 2014)
- Arx Atlantis (Ænima Recordings, 2015)
- Siamo Noi i Signori delle Terre a Nord (Ænima Recordings, 2018)
