= ...Di terra =

...di terra

Studio album by Banco
- Released: 1978
- Recorded: March–April 1978
- Genre: Progressive rock
- Length: 41:43
- Label: Ricordi
- Producers: David Zard, Banco

Banco chronology
Come in un'ultima cena (1976)	...di terra (1978)	Canto di primavera (1979)

Professional ratings
Review scores
Source	Rating
Allmusic	link

...di terra (lit. 'of earth' or 'earthen') is the seventh studio album by Italian progressive rock band Banco (previously called Banco del Mutuo Soccorso), released in 1978. It is an entirely instrumental work, recorded together with Orchestra dell'Unione Musicisti di Roma. The album's title is based on a poem of the same name by the band's vocalist Francesco Di Giacomo, with each song title a line from the poem.

== Track listing ==
No.	Title	Length
1.	"Nel cielo e nelle altre cose mute" (V. Nocenzi)	4:39
2.	"Terramadre" (G. Nocenzi)	3:08
3.	"Non senza dolore" (V. Nocenzi, G. Nocenzi)	5:02
4.	"Io vivo" (G. Nocenzi)	9:08
5.	"Né più di un albero non meno di una stella" (V. Nocenzi, G. Nocenzi)	8:01
6.	"Nei suoni e nei silenzi" (V. Nocenzi, G. Nocenzi)	5:48
7.	"Di terra" (V. Nocenzi, G. Nocenzi, Maltese)	5:57

== Personnel ==
- Vittorio Nocenzi — synthesizer, organ, electric piano
- Gianni Nocenzi — piano
- Rodolfo Maltese — electric guitar, acoustic guitar, trumpet
- Pier Luigi Calderoni — drums, timpani, percussion
- Renato D'Angelo — bass
- Alan King — saxophone, flute

Featuring Orchestra dell'Unione Musicisti di Roma, conducted by Vittorio Nocenzi, orchestration by Antonio Scarlato and Vittorio Nocenzi.
