= Come in un'ultima cena =

Studio album by Banco del Mutuo Soccorso
- Released: 1976
- Genre: Progressive rock
- Length: 44:55
- Label: Manticore

Banco del Mutuo Soccorso chronology
Garofano rosso (1976)	Come in un'ultima cena (1976)	...Di terra (1978)

Professional ratings
Review scores
Source	Rating
AllMusic	link

Come in un'ultima cena is the sixth studio album by Italian progressive rock band Banco del Mutuo Soccorso. The English version of the album was released with the title As in a Last Supper.

== Track listing ==
Music by Vittorio Nocenzi except (5, 6, 8) by Gianni Nocenzi. Lyrics by Francesco Di Giacomo and Vittorio Nocenzi.

Side one
No.	Title	Length
1.	"...A cena, per esempio (At Supper, for Example)"	6:20
2.	"Il ragno (The Spider)"	4:55
3.	"È così buono Giovanni, ma... (John Has a Good Heart, But...)"	3:32
4.	"Slogan"	7:23

Side two
No.	Title	Length
1.	"Si dice che i delfini parlino (They Say Dolphins Speak)"	5:50
2.	"Voilà Mida (Il guaritore) (Voila Midae! (The Healer))"	6:14
3.	"Quando la buona gente dice (When Good People Counsel)"	1:57
4.	"La notte è piena (The Night is Full)"	4:14
5.	"Fino alla mia porta (Towards My Door)"	4:30

== Personnel ==
- Vittorio Nocenzi – keyboards
- Gianni Nocenzi – keyboards, clarinet
- Francesco Di Giacomo – vocals
- Rodolfo Maltese – Guitar, trumpet, vocals
- Pierluigi Calderoni – drums, percussion
- Renato D'Angelo – Bass, guitar

== Guest musicians ==
- Angelo Branduardi - Violin
