= Uomo di pezza =

Studio album by Le Orme
- Released: 1972
- Recorded: 1972
- Genre: Progressive rock
- Length: 31:47
- Language: Italian
- Label: Philips
- Producer: Gian Piero Reverberi

Le Orme chronology
Collage (1971)	Uomo di pezza (1972)	Felona e Sorona (1973)

Uomo di pezza is an album by the Italian progressive rock band Le Orme. It was released in 1972 and was one of their best selling works, which won an Italian award disco d'oro.

Compared to the previous album, it shows many more classical elements: the opening of the album, for example, is a chaconne of Johann Sebastian Bach, played on piano by Gian Piero Reverberi. Furthermore, Tony Pagliuca plays a synthesizer for the first time.

The title Uomo di pezza means "rag doll man". The doll character comes from the lyrics of the song "Gioco di bimba". The lyrics of Uomo di pezza describe a helpless masculine attitude, juxtaposed to an unknown, inscrutable feminine universe.

== Track listing ==
- All music and lyrics by Aldo Tagliapietra and Antonio Pagliuca.

Side 1

1. "'Una dolcezza nuova" - 5:31
2. "Gioco di bimba" - 2:56
3. "La porta chiusa" - 7:32

Side 2

4. "Breve immagine" - 2:45
5. "Figure di cartone" - 3:51
6. "Aspettando l’alba" - 4:45
7. "Alienazione" - 4:44

== Personnel ==
- Tony Pagliuca – keyboards
- Aldo Tagliapietra – voice, bass, guitars
- Michi Dei Rossi – drums, percussion

Guest

- Gian Piero Reverberi – piano on track 1
