= Palepoli =

Studio album by Osanna
- Released: January 12, 1973
- Genre: Progressive rock
- Length: 41:51
- Label: Fonit Cetra

Osanna chronology
Milano Calibro 9 (1972)	Palepoli (1973)	Landscape of life (1974)

Professional ratings
Review scores
Source	Rating
irradiorock	3.5/5 stars

Palepoli is a progressive rock album released in 1973 by the Italian band Osanna, widely considered amongst the best in the Italian progressive rock genre.

Palepolis was the name of the pre-Greek settlement of Naples, the city from which the band members originated. The album shows a wild mix of progressive and Neapolitan-Mediterranean influences. The lyrics, composed by vocalist Lino Vairetti, mix social themes with mythological and mystic ones.

== Track listing ==
- "Oro caldo" – 18:30
- "Stanza città" – 1:45
- "Animale senza respiro" – 21:36

== Personnel ==
- Danilo Rustici – guitars, vox organ, electric piano, vocals
- Lino Vairetti – lead vocals, rhythm guitars, ARP 2600, Mellotron
- Elio D'Anna – tenor and soprano sax, flute, vocals
- Massimo Guarino – drums, vibraphone, percussion
- Lello Brandi – bass

== Release information ==
The Fonit Cetra CD version of the album (in 1980) has "Stanza Città", the second track of the LP, put at the very end of "Oro Caldo", while the second track of the CD is not the real "Stanza Città" but a rehash of the beginning of "Oro Caldo" intertwined with a reversed track ("There will be time" from "Milano Calibro 9"). Lino Vairetti, lead singer and frontman of Osanna, confirmed this multiple times.
