= Osanna =

Italian band

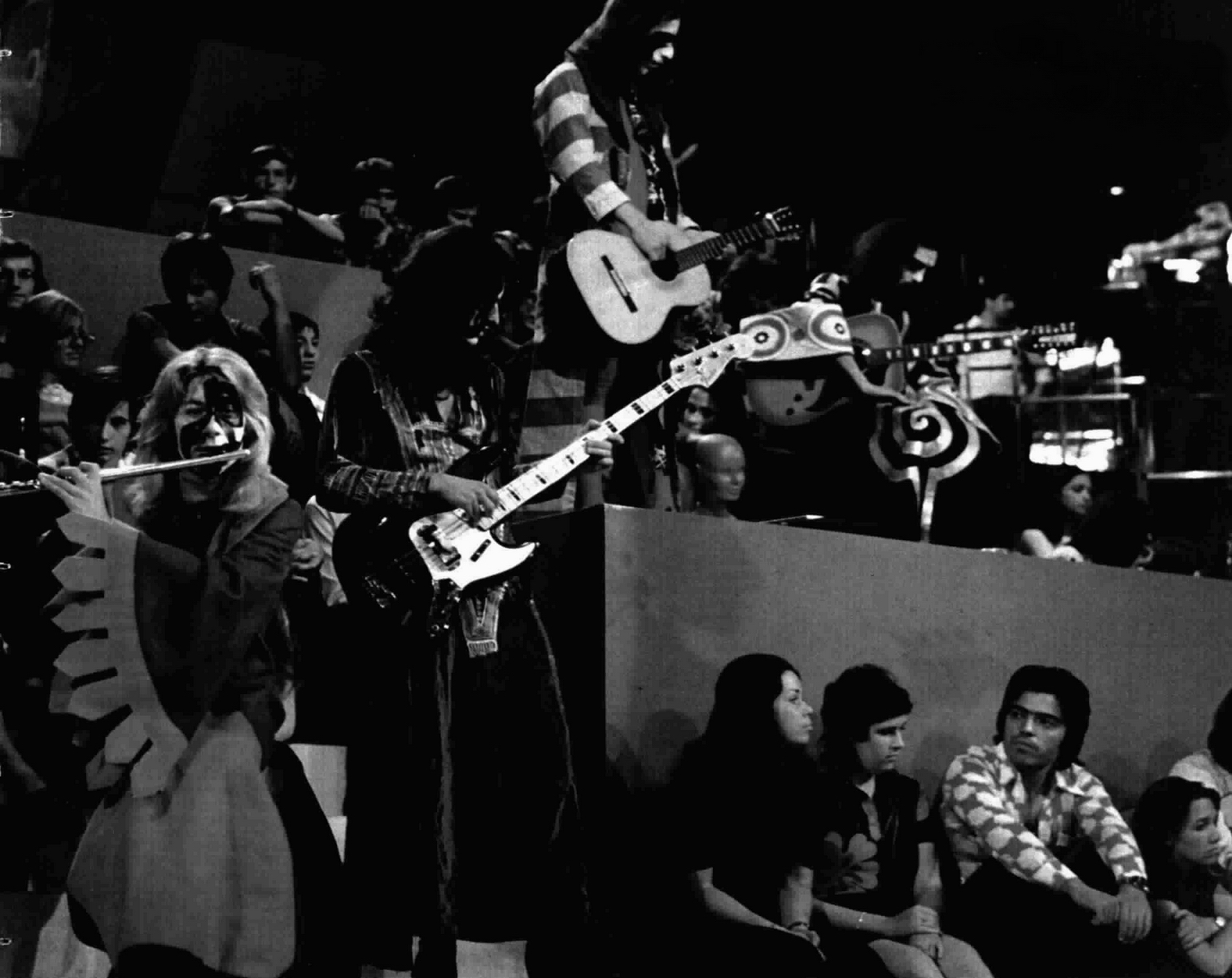
- Osanna performing in the TV show Tutto è pop, 1972.

Background information
- Origin: Naples, Italy
- Genres: Progressive rock, psychedelic rock
- Years active: 1970–present

Osanna are an Italian progressive rock band.

== Origin ==
The group originated in the Vomero neighborhood of Naples with the union of Lino Vairetti (voice), Danilo Rustici (guitar), Massimo Guarino (drums), Lello Brandi (bass), from the first line-up of the band Città Frontale, and Elio D'Anna (flute and sax), former member of the Showmen. Osanna were among the first bands in the world to present themselves theatrically in their shows, featuring costumes and made-up faces.

== Artistic output ==
After the debut album L'uomo, they released the soundtrack for the film Milano Calibro 9. In 1972 they toured in Italy alongside Genesis. Their following album Palepoli (1973) is regarded as one of the finest hours of the Italian progressive rock movement, characterized by a wild composition fantasy which mixes Neapolitan and Mediterranean sounds with modern progressive rock elements, such as the extensive use of electric guitar and mellotron.

In 1974, despite strife amongst band members, they released Landscape of Life, which included participation from future rock and pop producer Corrado Rustici, brother of Danilo and former guitarist of Cervello, another artistic band hailing from Naples. The band disbanded but reformed in 1977 without D'Anna, who was replaced by keyboardist Fabrizio D'Angelo, while the bass role was taken up by Enzo Petrone. With this line-up they released Suddance in 1978, to a large extent containing lyrics in the Neapolitan language.

Osanna disbanded again in 1979.

== Reformation ==
The Osanna reformed in 1999, releasing the LP Taka boom the following year, including old successes and some new songs. Their next production was Prog Family, under the name of Osanna/Jackson, featuring figures of progressive rock history, such as Van der Graaf Generator's saxophonist David Jackson (as per name), King Crimson's David Cross, Balletto di Bronzo's Gianni Leone and others.

With David Jackson, the band released a single, "A zingara"/"L'uomo" in 2008. Later, with David Jackson and Gianni Leone, the band contributed eight tracks to the live boxed set Prog exhibition.

== Rustici's death ==
Danilo Rustici died in Naples on 26 February 2021, at the age of 72 from the effects of COVID-19.

== Discography ==
- L'uomo (1971)
- Preludio Tema Variazioni e Canzona (best known as Milano Calibro 9, 1972) – issued in the US via Neil Kempfer-Stocker's imprint, COSMOS
- Palepoli (1973)
- Landscape of life (1974) – issued in the US via COSMOS
- Suddance, (1978)
- Taka boom, Afrakà (2001, anthology with new songs)
- Live - Uomini e Miti (live, 2003)
- Prog Family (2008, as Osanna Jackson)

== See also ==
- Italian progressive rock
- Il Balletto di Bronzo
- Il Banco del Mutuo Soccorso
- I Cervello
- La Locanda delle Fate
- Le Orme
- Nova (Italian band)
- La Premiata Forneria Marconi
- Il Rovescio della Medaglia
