= Il Balletto di Bronzo =

Italian progressive rock band from Naples

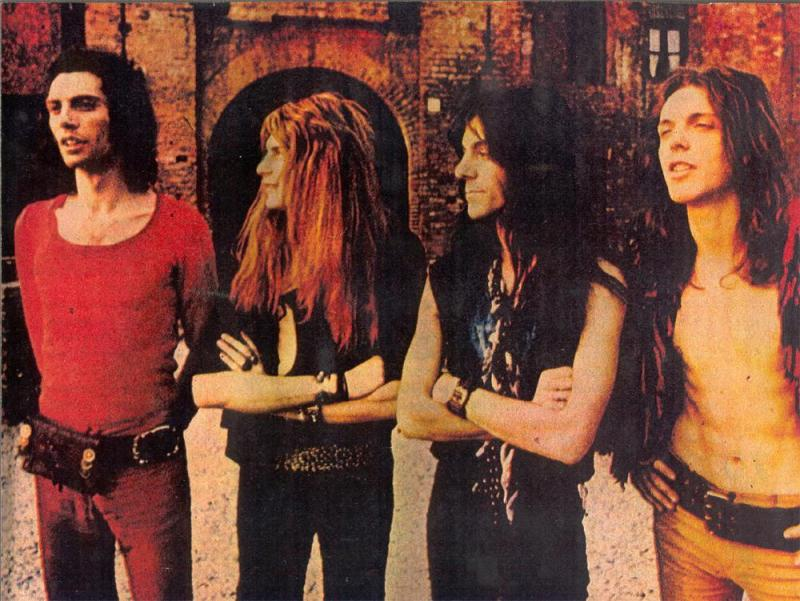
- Balletto di Bronzo in 1972

Background information
- Origin: Naples, Italy
- Genres: Progressive rock
- Years active: 1966–1973; 1999–present
- Labels: RCA, Polydor, Mellow Records
- Members: Romolo Amichi, Giani Leone, Ugo Vantini, Lino Ajello, Marco Cecioni
- Website: www.ballettodibronzo.too.it

Il Balletto di Bronzo (translation: "The Bronze Ballet") is an Italian progressive rock band from Naples. The band was initially formed as the I Battitori Selvaggi, and played Nato bases in Italy. Early members included Raffaele Cascone, a progressive guitarist and Freddy Cannon on drums. Cannon would later become a very successful record company executive with EMI, Carrere, PWL and join BMI as a senior executive in 1994. They changed their name to Il Balletto di Bronzo in 1969 and released two singles. The singles were Neve Calda / Comincio 'Per Gioco (1969) and Si, Mama Mama / Meditazione (1970). Their albums were Sirio 2222 (1970) followed by Ys (1972), before their first break up in 1973.

== History ==
Sirio 2222 (1970) is a psychedelic album originally released on RCA Italiana. The line-up of the band at this time was Marco Cecioni (vocals, guitar), Lino Ajello (guitar), Michele Cupaiuolo (bass) and Giancarlo Stinga (drums). "Ti risveglierai con me", a track from the album, plays over the end credits for the 1970 film Five Dolls for an August Moon.

In 1971 both Cecioni and Cupaiuolo left the band, replaced by Gianni Leone (vocals, keyboards), from the band Città Frontale, and Vito Manzari (bass), formerly of Rome's Quelle Strane Cose Che. This line-up released Ys in 1972 on Polydor, one of the most acclaimed examples of Italian symphonic rock. Written by Leone, Ys is a concept album based on the legend of Ys, a lost French city. The album is divided into four parts: "Introduzione", "Primo Incontro", "Secondo Incontro" and "Terzo Incontro ed Epilogo".

The band released more singles, including La tua casa comoda/Donna Vittoria. Over the years, several rarities, including previously unreleased English and Spanish language singles, have surfaced. Some of these were collected on the 1990 release Il Re Del Castello.

Despite breaking up in the early 1970s, Il Balletto di Bronzo continued to exert an influence, mostly on the strength of their second album. Several bands, amongst them Nurse With Wound, have cited them as an influence: The band is on the Nurse With Wound list. The album Ys has been reissued at different times in Italy, Korea and Japan.

In the late 1990s, Gianni Leone reformed the band as a trio, recording the live album Trys. This incarnation of the band toured with a rotating roster, Leone being the sole constant.

In 2013 Lino Ajello and Marco Cecioni reformed the band but the name "Balletto di Bronzo" continues to belong to the prog trio of Gianni Leone who however, participated in the recording of "CUMA 2016 DC". After 40 years, the 3 historical elements of "Balletto di Bronzo" are again reunited for this recording project "CUMA 2016 D.C."

== Discography ==
=== Albums ===
- 1970 - Sirio 2222, RCA Italiana
- 1972 - Ys, Polydor
- 2016 - Cuma 2016 D.C., Suoni Del Sud / No Music No Life
- 2023 - Lemures, Black Widow SRC

=== Singles ===
- 1969 - Neve calda/Cominciò per gioco, AEC/RCA
- 1970 - Sì, mama mama/Meditazione, RCA Italiana
- 1973 - La tua casa comoda/Donna Vittoria, Polydor

=== Live ===
- 1999 - Trys, Mellow Music

=== Compilations ===
- 1990 - Il re del castello, RCA Raro! (early singles)

== See also ==
- Il Banco del Mutuo Soccorso
- Cervello
- La Locanda delle Fate
- Le Orme
- Osanna
- Nova
- La Premiata Forneria Marconi
- Il Rovescio della Medaglia
