= Darwin! =

Studio album by Banco del Mutuo Soccorso
- Released: 1972
- Genre: Italian progressive rock
- Length: 46:50
- Label: Ricordi
- Producer: Alessandro Colombini

Banco del Mutuo Soccorso chronology
Banco del Mutuo Soccorso (1972)	Darwin! (1972)	Io sono nato libero (1973)

Professional ratings
Review scores
Source	Rating
Allmusic	4.5/5 stars

Darwin! is the second studio album by Banco del Mutuo Soccorso, released in 1972 on the Ricordi label. It is a concept album about the birth and the evolution of life on Earth.

The album is highly rated by progressive rock fans as one of the top albums in the genre.

== Track listing ==
All lyrics are written by Vittorio Nocenzi and Francesco Di Giacomo; all music is composed by Vittorio Nocenzi.

Side one
No.	Title	Length
1.	"L'evoluzione (Evolution)"	13:59
2.	"La conquista della posizione eretta (The Conquest of the Upright Stance)"	8:42

Side two
No.	Title	Length
1.	"Danza dei grandi rettili (Dance of the Big Reptiles)"	3:42
2.	"Cento mani e cento occhi (One Hundred Hands and One Hundred Eyes)"	5:22
3.	"750000 anni fa...l'amore? (750000 Years Ago...Love?)"	5:38
4.	"Miserere alla storia (Lament to History)"	5:58
5.	"Ed ora io domando tempo al tempo ed egli mi risponde...non ne ho! (And Now I Ask Time for More Time and He Answers Me...I Don't Have Any!)"	3:29

== Personnel ==
- Pierluigi Calderoni - drums, timpani
- Vittorio Nocenzi - organ, harpsichord, synthesizer
- Renato D'Angelo - bass guitar, double bass
- it:Marcello Todaro - electric guitar, acoustic guitar, trumpet, backing vocals
- Gianni Nocenzi - piano, clarinet
- Francesco Di Giacomo - lead vocals
- Produced by Alessandro Colombini
- Engineered by Walter Patergnani
