= Felona e Sorona =

Studio album by Le Orme
- Released: 1973
- Recorded: 1973
- Genre: Progressive rock
- Length: 33:39
- Label: Philips Records
- Producer: Gian Piero Reverberi

Le Orme chronology
Uomo di pezza (1972)	Felona e Sorona (1973)	Contrappunti (1974)

Felona e Sorona is an album by the Italian progressive rock band Le Orme. It was released in 1973.

Named one of the "finest examples of Italian progressive rock", it is a concept album pivoting on the story of two planets which revolve one around the other, without ever coming in contact. While Felona is shiny and flourishing, Sorona is dark and home to plagues and catastrophes; however, in the second part of the suite, the fate of the two planets is inverted.

Apart from two acoustic interludes, the music is mainly keyboard- and synth-driven, producing gloomy and spacey effects, especially in the opening "Sospesi nell'incredibile" and in the instrumental ending piece, "Ritorno al nulla" ("Return to Naught").

A version with English lyrics written by Peter Hammill of Van der Graaf Generator was issued in the U.K. by Charisma Records in 1974. The English title is Felona and Sorona.

A new edition containing both Italian and English versions was released in 2011 on vinyl and CD formats, with new liner notes written by journalists Mario Giammetti and Ernesto De Pascale.

The album was re-recorded in 2016.

== Reception ==
Professional ratings
Review scores
Source	Rating
Allmusic	4.5/5 stars

Paul Stump, in his History of Progressive Rock, said Felona e Sorona is "a run-of-the-mill B-movie melodrama about warring planets, and didn't deserve [Peter] Hammill's (dashed-off) input."

== Track listing ==
All tracks performed by Le Orme.

The titles of the English version are shown between parentheses.

Side 1

1. "Sospesi nell'incredibile" ("In between") – 8:43
2. "Felona" – 1:58
3. "La solitudine di chi protegge il mondo" ("The loneliness of those who protect the world") – 1:57
4. "L'equilibrio" ("The Balance") – 3:47

Side 2

5. "Sorona" – 2:28
6. "Attesa inerte" – 3:25
7. "Ritratto di un mattino" ("Portrait of a morning") – 3:29
8. "All'infuori del tempo" – 4:08
9. "Ritorno al nulla" ("Return to Naught") – 3:34

== Personnel ==
- Tony Pagliuca – keyboards
- Aldo Tagliapietra – voice, bass, guitars
- Michi Dei Rossi – drums, percussions
