= New Trolls =

Italian progressive rock band

- Origin: Genoa, Italy
- Genres: Progressive rock; symphonic rock; Italian progressive rock
- Years active: 1967–present
- Labels: Fonit Cetra, RCA Records, Magma Records, Warner Bros. Records
- Members: Nico Di Palo; Francesco Bellia; Mauro Sposito; Andrea Maddalone; Alfio Vitanza
- Past members: Giorgio D'Adamo; Mauro Chiarugi; Gianni Belleno; Frank Laugelli; Maurizio Salvi; Ricky Belloni; Giorgio Usai; Vittorio de Scalzi
- Website: www.newtrolls.it

New Trolls are an Italian progressive rock band, known for their fusion of rock and classical music. In a way not too dissimilar from fellow prog-rock band Yes, their history is filled with line-up changes, spin-off projects and personal struggles between band members.

== History ==
Vocalist and guitarist Vittorio de Scalzi, vocalist and guitarist Nico Di Palo, keyboardist Mauro Chiarugi, bassist Giorgio D'Adamo and drummer Gianni Belleno formed New Trolls in Genoa in the mid-1960s. They chose the name in reference to the fact that one of them had previously been in a band called Trolls.

After first gigs in local clubs, New Trolls became popular enough to perform as supporting act for the Rolling Stones on their 1967 Italian tour. Later that year, they released their debut single, "Sensazioni" (1967).

New Trolls's first full-length album, Senza orario Senza bandiera, was released in 1968. Singer-songwriter Fabrizio de André helped the band by contributing lyrics. The band's second album, simply titled New Trolls (1970), was a collection of non-album singles. Just as the band was making a dent in the European charts, Mauro Chiarugi quit. The other members continued as a quartet.

In 1971 New Trolls released their most successful album, Concerto grosso per i New Trolls. Characterized by early symphonic rock experimentation and classical music arrangements written by composer Luis Enriquez Bacalov,Concerto grosso per i New Trolls is considered one of the finest Italian prog-rock albums ever made.

In 1972, Giorgio D'Adamo was replaced by the Italo-Canadian bassist Frank Laugelli. With the new line-up the band released Searching for a land, a double album featuring a combination of studio and live tracks mostly sung in English. The album was disjointed and did not perform commercially well as the band's previous efforts. New Trolls' following album, Ut, introduced a heavier, hard-rock sound. Although the album restored the band's success, serious creative differences between the band members resulted in the emergence of two camps, with Di Palo and De Scalzi entering a legal dispute for the use of the band name.

De Scalzi reunited with Giorgio D'Adamo and released a single, "Una notte sul Monte Calvo", a pop-rock rendition of Mussorgsky's Night on Bald Mountain, as New Trolls. After a legal injunction from Di Palo, the band released an album under the name New Trolls Atomic System. Following a bitter legal battle, the Italian court ruled in De Scalzi's favour and Di Palo and the other three band members released their next album with a question mark replacing the name of their band. The quartet was later dubbed Ibis.

The De Scalzi-led lineup, often mistakenly referred to as New Trolls Atomic System, released their first album in 1973 with arrangements similar to the ones used previously in Concerto grosso per i New Trolls. In 1973 De Scalzi founded Magma Records, which released the album. De Scalzi himself played the flute, keyboards and guitar in this work. The second album, Tempi dispari, was a live instrumental jazz-rock fusion album, completely different from the previous New Trolls sound. With the court case settled De Scalzi was again able to use the name New Trolls; despite this Tempi dispari was rather unsuccessful.

The disappointment of Tempi dispari triggered the breakup of the De Scalzi-led incarnation of New Trolls. Amazingly, De Scalzi rejoined his old friend/rival Di Palo and drummer Belleno for a new chapter in New Trolls' history. Bassist D'Adamo remained and singer/guitarist Ricky Belloni was hired to complete the line-up. In 1975 the band released a live album on Magma simply titled N.T. L.I.V.E., which contained songs prior to breakup and some excerpts from the forthcoming studio album Concerto grosso no. 2, which was released in 1976. Concerto grosso no. 2 revisited the style of their best-selling album, but this time the critics considered it "pale" and too "pop-vein". Magma Records eventually released both "Concerto grosso" albums in a single package.

1978 brought a new member to the band, keyboardist Giorgio Usai. Then the band slowly abandoned its progressive style in favour of a mainstream pop rock sound that gave them many more hits (Quella carezza della sera and Aldebaran among them). The New Trolls kept in this line until the early 1990s.

From then on, the name New Trolls has appeared sporadically in the music scene. During the 1990s Vittorio De Scalzi recruited several musicians to tour playing old New Trolls songs. Some album remakes and greatest-hits collections have appeared too. In 1999 Di Palo, Belloni and Belleno tried to regroup the band (again) but came into legal conflict with De Scalzi.

In 2001 a two-disc set was released credited to De Scalzi: La storia dei New Trolls. Recorded live, the first disc includes reworkings of old tracks, while the second is a complete rendition of Concerto grosso per i New Trolls with full orchestra.

By 2002 the band led by De Scalzi kept touring with La storia dei New Trolls repertoire. Di Palo and former band members regrouped as Il Mito New Trolls, only touring and performing old songs, not releasing any record yet.

2007 saw what was the latest reunion of De Scalzi and Di Palo. Reuniting elements from both members' bands, the reformed New Trolls released Concerto grosso: the seven seasons, a continuation of their classical/rock blending "Concerto grosso" series. For this issue, the band returned to English lyrics, written by Shel Shapiro. The record was produced and released by the band's own label, Aereostella.

De Scalzi died, age 72, on 24 July 2022.

== Official discography ==
=== Albums ===
- 1968 – Senza orario Senza bandiera
- 1970 – New Trolls (collection of singles)
- 1971 – Concerto grosso per i New Trolls
- 1972 – Searching for a land (double album, studio recording on the first disc, live recording on the second)
- 1972 – Ut

Later that year, New Trolls were disbanded because of artistic divergences between the members. Vittorio De Scalzi continued with the New Trolls Atomic System, Nico Di Palo formed two different bands, Tritons and Ibis, while Gianni Belleno recorded some singles under the pseudonym Johnny Dei Tritons and continued to play live with a band named Il Cuore Dei New Trolls. The releases of the subsequent years are:

- 1973 – N.T. Atomic System (New Trolls Atomic System)
- 1973 – Satisfaction (Tritons, remake collection of rock classics)
- 1973 – Canti d'innocenza, canti d'esperienza (Nico, Gianni, Frank, Maurizio (pre-Ibis))
- 1974 – Twist and shout with satisfaction (Johnny Dei Tritons, remake collection of rock classics)
- 1974 – Tempi dispari (New Trolls Atomic System)
- 1974 – Sun supreme (Ibis)
- 1975 – Ibis (Ibis)

First reunion. The reformed New Trolls released:

- 1976 – Concerto grosso no. 2
- 1976 – Live
- 1978 – Aldebaran
- 1979 – New Trolls
- 1981 – FS
- 1983 – America O.K.
- 1985 – Tour (live, includes the single Faccia di cane)
- 1988 – Amici
- 1990 – Live con i New Trolls (2 LP, live with Anna Oxa)
- 1992 – Quelli come noi (includes the single Quelli come noi and re-arranged old songs)
- 1996 – Il sale dei New Trolls

There was another division. The members continued as two separate bands (La Storia Dei New Trolls and Il Mito New Trolls):

- 2001 – Live (Vittorio de Scalzi – La Storia Dei New Trolls)
- 2001 – Concerto grosso live (Vittorio de Scalzi – La Storia Dei New Trolls)
- 2005 – Live (Vittorio de Scalzi – Il Suonatore Jones: played early tracks of New Trolls in Live DVD)
- 2007 – TR3 (Nico di Palo – Il Mito New Trolls: live DVD, recorded in 2004)

Second reunion (but Il Mito New Trolls was continued by Ricky Belloni). Since then the band has released:

- 2007 – Concerto grosso: the seven seasons (1CD and 2LP edition exists)
- 2007 – Concerto grosso trilogy live (1DVD + 2CD – songs from all three "Concerto grosso" albums)

The band is divided in two again (La Leggenda New Trolls and UT(Uno Tempore) New Trolls):

- 2012 – Live in Milano (UT New Trolls)
- 2013 – Concerto Grosso 1-2-3 di Luis Bacalov (La Leggenda New Trolls)
- 2013 – Concerto Grosso N° 3 (La Leggenda New Trolls, 1CD and 2LP edition exists)
- 2013 – Do Ut Des (UT New Trolls, 1CD and 1LP edition exists)
- 2015 – E (UT New Trolls)

=== Compilations etc. ===
- 1975 – New Trolls (double compilation album)
- 1977 – Revival (compilation)
- 1987 – New Trolls story (compilation)
- 1987 – New Trolls raccolta (compilation)
- 1989 – Quella carezza della sera (compilation)
- 1994 – Singles A's & B's (compilation of singles)
- 1996 – Concerto Grosso e raccolta (compilation)
- 1997 – Il meglio (studio live, recorded 1993, a.k.a. Una Miniera)
