= Banco del Mutuo Soccorso =

Italian progressive rock band

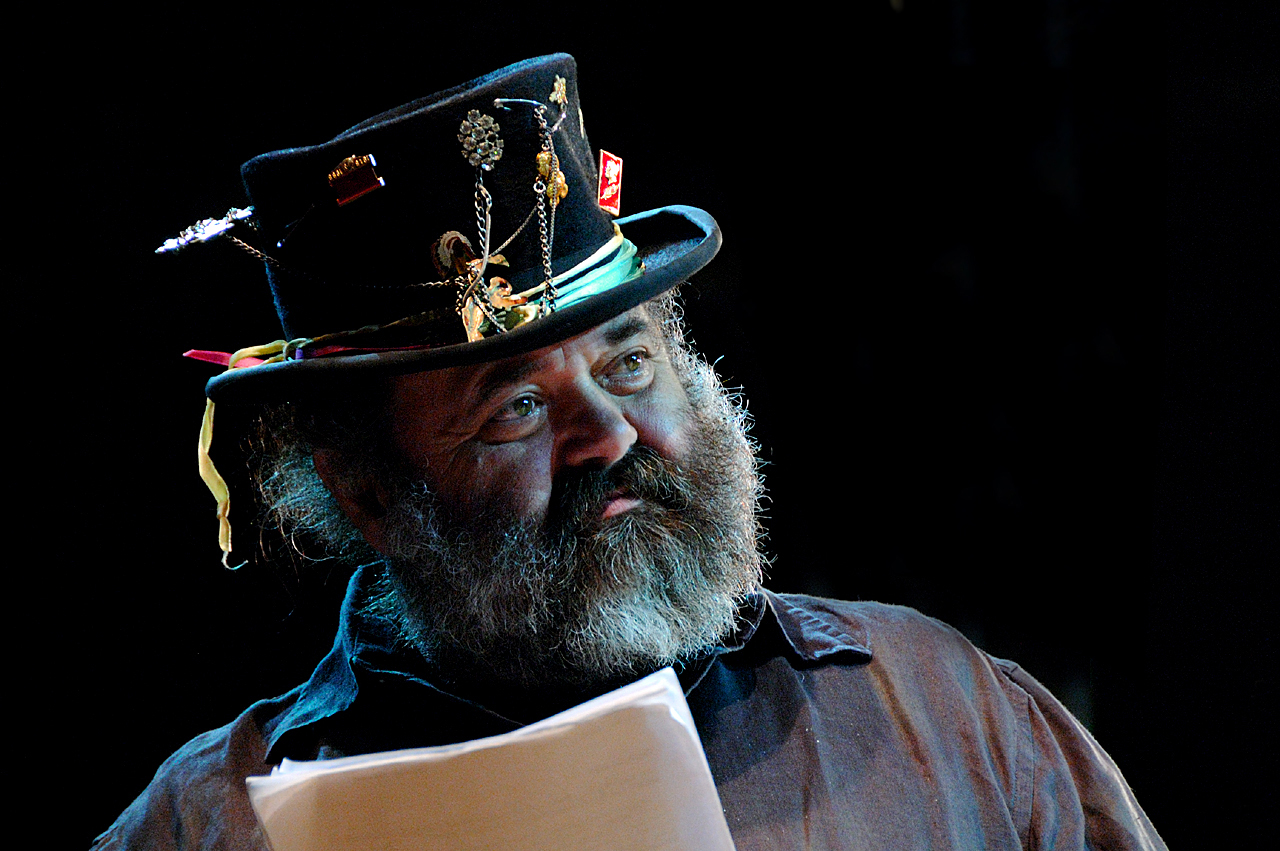
- Francesco Di Giacomo of Banco, at a concert in Frascati, 2009

Background information
- Also known as: Banco, BMS
- Origin: Rome, Italy
- Genres: Progressive rock; art rock
- Years active: 1969–present
- Labels: Ricordi; Manticore; Ri-Fi; EMI; Sony; Clan
- Members: Vittorio Nocenzi; Filippo Marcheggiani; Nicola Di Già; Tony D'Alessio; Marco Capozi; Dario Esposito
- Past members: Francesco Di Giacomo; Gianni Nocenzi; Rodolfo Maltese; Claudio Falco; Fabrizio Falco; Franco Pontecorvi; Marcello Todaro; Renato D'Angelo; Pierluigi Calderoni; Gianni Colaiacomo; Karl Potter; Tiziano Ricci; Maurizio Masi; Alessandro Papotto
- Website: bancodelmutuosoccorso.it

Banco del Mutuo Soccorso (English: Bank of Mutual Relief) is an Italian rock band. A popular progressive rock band in the 1970s, they continued making music in the 1980s and 1990s. They were still active by the 2000s, playing live in 2001 and 2008 at NEARfest. Their frontman, Francesco Di Giacomo, died in 2014.

== History ==
Inspired by progressive rock acts from England, in particular Gentle Giant, Jethro Tull and Emerson, Lake & Palmer, keyboardists Vittorio Nocenzi and his brother Gianni founded Banco del Mutuo Soccorso in Rome, Italy. In 1972, together with other musicians from Rome's progressive scene, they recorded their eponymous debut album which, with songs such as "R.I.P. (Requiescant in pace)", "Il giardino del mago" and "Metamorfosi", immediately attracted the attention of the public of the nascent progressive rock scene in Italy. The graphic design of the cover is also very particular: shaped as a terracotta piggy bank. In the same year, the second album was released, Darwin!, the first concept album made by the group: the songs are all linked to the central theme of Charles Darwin's theory on the evolution of species. In 1973 Io sono nato libero increased their notoriety thanks to the single "Non mi rompete", an acoustic ballad with poetic dreamy lyrics. The most prominent features of their sound are the complex textures provided by the piano, Hammond organ and synthesizers played by the Nocenzi brothers, along with the vocals of former frontman Di Giacomo. A careful balance of electronic and acoustic instruments, with the use of reeds (played by some of the members of the band, in addition to their usual instrument), made Banco's sound increasingly original and innovative, with a blend of rock, jazz and classical music which did not, however, forsake the Italian melodic tradition.

Proving popular in Italy and becoming known abroad, the band signed with Manticore Records together with the Premiata Forneria Marconi. In 1975 Banco was released, a collection of translated songs together with new material, targeting the international market. Come in un'ultima cena was also translated as As in a Last Supper. The late 1970s saw Banco del Mutuo Soccorso going in new directions, producing a film soundtrack with 1976's Garofano rosso and recordings with an orchestra in 1978's ...di terra. They later changed their name to the simplified Banco.

The 1980s saw Banco's musical direction change towards lighter pop and shorter songs, producing some hits. This is due to the limited success they had abroad with their albums with English lyrics (also due to the shutdown of Manticore in 1977), which led to the decision to exploit Di Giacomo's remarkable vocal gifts with more marketable songs. Gianni Nocenzi left the band to pursue a solo career, while other members came and went.

In the 1990s and now back to using the longer name, they started playing their 1970s material again. They performed unplugged versions of their songs live and re-recorded their first albums. New material was also produced.

On 21 February 2014, Francesco di Giacomo died in a car accident, in Zagarolo, at the age of 66.

On 3 October 2015, the band guitarist Rodolfo Maltese died too after a long battle with cancer.

In September 2016 some Italian newspapers claimed that the band has taken on Tony D'Alessio, best known from the Italian edition of X-Factor, as the new lead singer.

On 13 January 2019, a press release announced that a new album, Transiberiana, would be released in April. It was their first new release after Nudo, which was published in 1997.

On July 20, 2022 the band's official Facebook page announces the release of the single "Cadere o Volare" for July 22, which anticipates the release of the album Orlando: Le Forme dell'Amore, a concept album on the chivalrous poem Orlando Furioso by Ludovico Ariosto, for 23 September. On September 6 "La Pianura Rossa" was released, the second single that teased the release of the album.

Today, the band continues to play live concerts.

== Members ==
=== Current members ===
- Vittorio Nocenzi – keyboards, vocals (1968-present)
- Filippo Marcheggiani – guitar (1994-present)
- Nicola Di Già – guitar (2013-present)
- Tony D'Alessio – vocals (2016-present)
- Marco Capozi – bass (2016-present)
- Dario Esposito – drums (2023-present)

=== Former members ===
- Mario Achilli – drums (1968-1969)
- Claudio Falco – guitar (1969-1971)
- Fabrizio Falco – bass (1968-1971)
- Franco Pontecorvi – drums (1969-1971)
- Marcello Todaro – guitar (1971-1973)
- Renato D'Angelo – bass (1971-1978)
- Karl Potter – percussions (1979-1980)
- Gianni Colajacomo – bass (1978-1984)
- Gianni Nocenzi – keyboards (1968-1984)
- Gabriel Amato – bass, keyboards (1985)
- Paolo Carta – guitar (1986-1987)
- Pierluigi Calderoni – drums (1971-1992)
- Francesco Di Giacomo – vocals (1971-2014)
- Maurizio Masi – drums (1992-2015)
- Alessandro Papotto – flute (1999-2015)
- Rodolfo Maltese – guitar, flute (1973-2015)
- Arnaldo Vacca – percussions (2014-2015)
- John De Leo – vocals (2015-2016)
- Tiziano Ricci – bass (1987-2016)
- Vito Sardo – drums (2015-2016)
- Maurizio Solieri – guitar (2015-2016)
- Augusto Zanonzini – drums (2016-2017)
- Fabio Moresco – drums (2017-2023)

== Discography ==
=== Studio albums ===
Year	Title	Italian Chart	Notes
1972	Banco del Mutuo Soccorso	5	
1972	Darwin!	4	
1973	Io sono nato libero	10	
1975	Banco	10	includes English versions of songs from previous albums
1976	Garofano rosso	9	film soundtrack
1976	Come in un'ultima cena	8	also recorded in English (As in a Last Supper)
1978	…di terra		with Orchestra dell'Unione Musicisti di Roma
1979	Canto di primavera	36	
1980	Urgentissimo	11	
1981	Buone Notizie		
1983	Banco	23	
1985	...e via	42	
1994	Il 13		
1997	Nudo		
2019	Transiberiana	19	
2022	Orlando: Le Forme dell'Amore	35	
2025	Storie invisibili	76	

=== Live albums ===
Year	Title	Italian Chart	Notes
1979	Capolinea	28	
2003	No Palco		30th anniversary live album
2005	Seguendo le Tracce		live recording from 1975

=== Other releases ===
Year	Title	Italian Chart	Notes
1976	As In A Last Supper		English version of Come in un'ultima cena
1989	Donna Plautilla		compilation of previously unreleased pre-1972 material
1989	Non Mettere le Dita nel Naso		under the name of Francesco Di Giacomo
1991	Darwin		reworking of the original 1972 album
1991	Da qui Messere si Domina la Valle		re-release of the first two albums
1993	La Storia		compilation
1996	Banco d'Accusa		compilation boxset, released under the name of Francesco Di Giacomo

=== Singles ===
- 1973 - Non mi rompete/La città sottile (Dischi Ricordi, SRL 10713)
- 1979 - Canto di primavera/Circobanda (Dischi Ricordi, SRL 10896)
- 1979 - Niente/Sono la bestia (Dischi Ricordi, SRL 10908)
- 1980 - Il ragno/Capolinea (Dischi Ricordi, SRL 10915)
- 1980 - Paolo Pà / Ma che idea
- 1980 - Dove sarà / Ma che idea
- 1980 - Il ragno / Rip
- 1981 - Baciami Alfredo / Buone notizie
- 1981 - Tommy/Mississippi (pubblicato come La banda di Tom)
- 1983 - Moby Dick / Velocità
- 1983 - Lontano da
- 1985 - Grande Joe / Allons enfant
- 1989 - Padre Francesco/Vedo il telefono/La mia libertà (Contempo, PT 42926 EP)
- 1994 - Brivido
- 1997 - Nudo
- 1997 - Ragno
- 2019 - I ruderi del gulag
- 2022 - Cadere o volare
- 2022 - La pinura rossa

=== Videos ===
- Ciò che si vede è (1992, DVD release in 2004)
- Live 1980 (2007)

=== See also ===
- Balletto di Bronzo
- I Cervello
- La Locanda delle Fate
- Le Orme
- Osanna
- Nova
- Premiata Forneria Marconi
- Il Rovescio della Medaglia
