= Canto di primavera =

Studio album by Banco
- Released: 1979
- Genre: Progressive rock, Italian progressive rock
- Length: 38:15
- Label: Ricordi
- Producer: Banco

Banco chronology
...di terra (1978)	Canto di primavera (1979)	Capolinea (1979)

Canto di primavera (meaning 'Song of Spring') is the eighth studio album by the Italian progressive rock band, Banco del Mutuo Soccorso. The album was first released in 1979. It marked the return to lyrical songs after the instrumental album, ...di terra. The album reached to No. 36 in the Italian album chart.

== Track listing ==
No.	Title	Length
1.	"Ciclo"	4:20
2.	"Canto di primavera"	5:30
3.	"Sono la bestia"	4:35
4.	"Niente"	4:00
5.	"E mi viene da pensare"	3:20
6.	"Interno città"	6:30
7.	"Lungo il margine"	4:50
8.	"Circobana"	6:30

=== Translation ===
No.	Title	Length
1.	"Round"	4:20
2.	"Song of Spring"	5:30
3.	"The Beast"	4:35
4.	"Nothing"	4:00
5.	"And I'm Thinking"	3:20
6.	"Inner City"	6:30
7.	"Along the Margin"	4:50
8.	"Circobana"	6:30

== Personnel ==
- Vittorio Nocenzi — keyboards
- Gianni Nocenzi — clarinet, keyboards
- Rodolfo Maltese — electric guitar, trumpet, vocals
- George Aghedo — percussion
- Pier Luigi Calderoni — drums
- Gianni Colaiacomo — bass
- Luigi Cinque — saxophone, harmonica
- Francesco DiGiacomo — vocals

with:

- Gianni Prudente — sound engineer
