= Ocean's Eleven (soundtrack) =

Music from the Motion Picture Ocean's Eleven

Soundtrack album by David Holmes
- Released: December 4, 2001
- Studios: The Studio at Sunset Marquis, West Hollywood; Future Disc Mastering, Oregon
- Genres: Film score; jazz; electronic; punk; soul
- Length: 52:02
- Labels: Warner Sunset; Warner Bros.
- Producer: David Holmes

David Holmes chronology
Bow Down to the Exit Sign (2000)	Ocean's Eleven (2001)	Analyze That (2002)

Music from the Motion Picture Ocean's Eleven is the soundtrack album to the 2001 heist comedy film Ocean's Eleven directed by Steven Soderbergh. Released through Warner Bros. Records on December 4, 2001, the album accompanied various jazz and electronic songs, along with the original score composed by David Holmes. The album received positive reviews from critics.

== Track listing ==
No.	Title	Artist(s)	Length
1.	"A Song for Young Lovers"	Percy Faith	1:01
2.	"Boobytrappin"		2:33
3.	"The Projects"	Handsome Boy Modeling School	4:13
4.	"The Plans"		1:25
5.	"Papa Loves Mambo"	Perry Como	2:38
6.	"Ruben's Inn"		3:05
7.	"Lyman Zerga"		1:53
8.	"Caravan"	The Arthur Lyman Group	2:24
9.	"Gritty Shaker"		3:26
10.	"Planting the Seed"		2:12
11.	"Pickpockets"		1:31
12.	"A Little Less Conversation"	Elvis Presley	1:42
13.	"Dream, Dream, Dream"	Percy Faith	0:12
14.	"Stealing the Pinch"		1:04
15.	"Blues in the Night"	Quincy Jones	3:56
16.	"Tess"		3:22
17.	"Hookers"		1:07
18.	"$160 Million Chinese Man"		4:10
19.	"69 Police"		4:23
20.	"Claire De Lune"	Eugene Ormandy	5:00
21.	"A Song for Young Lovers" (Reprise)	Percy Faith	0:45
Total length:			52:02

== Reception ==
Aggregator Metacritic, which uses a weighted average, assigned Music from the Motion Picture Ocean's Eleven a score of 86 out of 100 based on 7 critics, indicating "universal acclaim".

Filmtracks wrote "The script of Ocean's Eleven is enjoyable enough that the album becomes a satisfying souvenir from the film, though purists will prefer a 34-track, 48-minute Warner Brothers awards promo with only Holmes' score. Since the music is so repetitious, though, the retail format may actually improve the listening experience." Dave Simpson of The Guardian wrote "Holmes's soundtrack flashes from joy to simmering malevolence, just as an old Vegas casino maintains a vicious underbelly beneath its veneer of outward respectability [...] This is a soundtrack that works purely as an album—and as an advertisement for the film." Heather Phares of AllMusic wrote "While it's not quite as immediate as the Snatch soundtrack or as groundbreaking as the Dust Brothers' Fight Club score, Ocean's 11 is a tight, kinetic collection of film music that's just as enjoyable outside of the movie's context." Kirk Honeycutt of The Hollywood Reporter wrote "David Holmes' cool, jazzy score makes this Ocean's Eleven feel hipper than Sinatra's".

Tom Sinclair of Entertainment Weekly wrote "The bulk of the music — composed by David Holmes ("Out of Sight") — is instrumental, and tools along in funky blaxploitation mode (with occasional nods to early-'70s Miles Davis). It's fine for what it is, but someone decided to spice things up with annoying snippets of film dialogue, which help to derail the flow. Percy Faith, Perry Como, Quincy Jones, and Elvis Presley are also represented here, but the disc ultimately feels schizy and unsatisfying." Sinéad Gleeson of RTÉ wrote "Combining his own compositions and a healthy helping of classic tunes, Holmes has created a backdrop as slickly sharp as the film itself." Phil Udell of Hot Press wrote "Holmes has got his finger well and truly on the pulse on the music of the period".

Gary Crossing of Dotmusic had noted that Holmes had assembled "over fifty minutes of slick loungey, cinematic music, ideally suited" for the film. Andy Hermann of PopMatters wrote "As good as Holmes' original material is, however, what's most impressive about the Ocean's Eleven soundtrack is the way in which Holmes uses it to weave together the hodge-podge of cool sounds he's culled from other artists."

== Chart performance ==
Weekly chart positions for Music from the Motion Picture Ocean's Eleven
Chart (2001–2002)	Peak position
Austrian Albums (Ö3 Austria)	34
French Albums (SNEP)	42
Swiss Albums (Schweizer Hitparade)	89
US Billboard 200	13

== Credits ==
Credits adapted from liner notes:

- Composer and producer – David Holmes
- Recording and mixing engineer – Hugo Nicolson, Jim Schultz, Mike Olsen
- Mastering engineer – Steve Hall
- Pro-tools operator – Jim Schultz
- Design – Lawrence Azerrad
- Double bass, electric bass – Bob Hurst
- Drums, percussion – Zach Danziger
- Guitar – Chris Dawkins
- Keyboards – Jim Watson, Scott Kinsey, Stephen Hilton
- Saxophone, flute – Steve Tavaglione
- Trumpet – Ron King
- Vibraphone, percussion – Brad Dutz
