= Gianluigi Di Franco =

Italian singer (1953–2005)

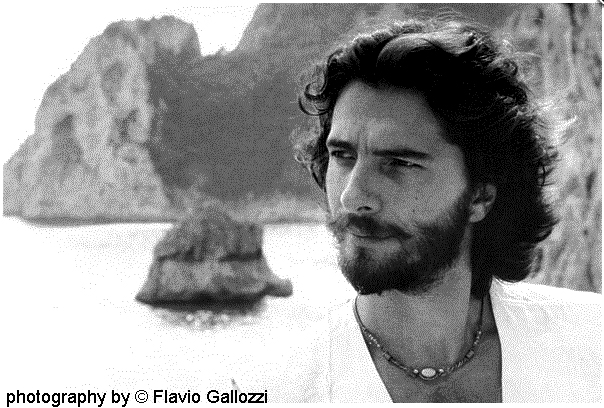

Gianluigi Di Franco (5 January 1953, in Capri – 19 March 2005, in Naples) was an Italian singer. In the early 1970s he joined the brothers Corrado and Danilo Rustici and formed the progressive rock band Cervello. The group disbanded after one album and Di Franco spent the 1970s working in a psychiatric hospital in Naples as a musicotherapist. In the early 1980s Di Franco resumed his music career. He collaborated with percussionist Tony Esposito, singing lead vocals on "Kalimba de luna" (1984) and "As Tu As" (1985). He also worked with Tullio De Piscopo and Mory Kanté on the single "Radio Africa" (1986). In 1988 he released his first solo album, Gianluigi Di Franco.

He died of cancer on March 19, 2005, aged 52.

== Discography ==
With Cervello: Melos (1973)

=== Solo album ===
- Gianluigi Di Franco (Dischi Ricordi SMRL 6377) 1988
1. Siren Ligheia
2. Go heavy
3. Luna
4. Semiramide
5. Nighi Naga
6. Insh'Allah
7. Scirocco
8. Can we be wrong
9. Vurria addiventare
10. Jingle in the jungle
11. Una vela nell’azzurro
