= Senza orario Senza bandiera =

Studio album by New Trolls
- Released: 1968
- Genres: Progressive rock; beat; Italian progressive rock
- Label: Fonit-Cetra

New Trolls chronology
Senza orario Senza bandiera (1968)	New Trolls (1970)

Senza orario Senza bandiera is the debut album by the Italian progressive rock band New Trolls, released in 1968.

The album is considered the first Italian concept album, where seamless, all songs develop a single theme: the vision of the world in the eyes of a poet. Lyrics are by Richard Mannerini and were set to arrangements by Fabrizio De André, who, like a mosaic, (the precise words of De André), "assembles them by fitting them in the metric".

The music is all by Nico Di Palo and Vittorio De Scalzi, except Signore, io sono Irish written by Gian Piero Reverberi, who works with the New Trolls on the arrangements, is the author of the short instrumental interludes that connect the songs and is also the producer of the album (with De André), and Vorrei comprare una strada, written by Reverberi with De André, De Scalzi and Di Palo. Of particular note are two tracks: the dreamy Vorrei comprare una strada and the antiwar Ti ricordi, Joe?, which consists of dialogue between two veterans of the Marines.

== Track listing ==
1. Ho Veduto 3:15
2. Vorrei Comprare una Strada 2:08
3. Signore, io Sono Irish 3:15
4. Susy Forrester 2:30
5. Al bar dell'angolo 2:28
6. Duemila 2:40
7. Ti Ricordi, Joe? 2:48
8. Padre O'Brien 2:54
9. Tom Flaherty 2:18
10. Andrò Ancora 2:15

== Personnel ==
- Vittorio De Scalzi - guitars, keyboard, vocals
- Nico Di Palo - guitars, vocals
- Mauro Chiarugi - keyboards
- Giorgio D'Adamo - bass
- Gianni Belleno - drums

== See also ==
- Italian progressive rock
- Fabrizio De André
