= Searching for a Land =

Studio album by New Trolls
- Released: June 15, 1972
- Genres: Progressive rock; hard rock
- Length: 71:12
- Language: English
- Label: Fonit Cetra

New Trolls chronology
Concerto grosso per i New Trolls (1971)	Searching for a Land (1972)	Ut (1972)

Searching for a Land is the fourth album from Italian progressive rock band New Trolls, released on June 15, 1972, by their record label Fonit Cetra. Following their 1971 album Concerto grosso per i New Trolls, the band changed bassists from Giorgio D'Adamo to Frank Laugelli. The album was released as a double LP (but is on one long CD), half of which is recorded live. The first seven tracks are all studio recorded, while the last four are recorded live. After the new direction that they had taken in their former album, Concerto grosso per i New Trolls, the band decided to continue their trend of releasing more mature music that incorporated classical music with rock music. The album was sung in English, which gave it mixed reviews from critics, as with most Italian albums that were English-sung.

== Background ==
After the European success of their album Concerto grosso per i New Trolls, the band embarked on their most ambitious project yet. Entirely composed in, and sung in English, Searching for a Land was the first double LP from the New Trolls and was considered to be one of the first albums after its predecessor (Concerto grosso per i New Trolls) to mix elements of Classical Music with Rock Music. The album had two discs, one of which was fully studio recorded, and the other being in front of a live audience. The album was released on June 15, 1972, and was even promoted on the Italian public TV, yet still didn't receive nearly as much praise as Concerto grosso per i New Trolls. This was in part due to the English lyrics and musical style that the Italian community took as a rip-off of English bands.

== Description ==
Side 1 of the album was a more Progressive Rock style, with more Hammond Organ and complex concepts and interludes, also having special lyrics written by newly added Italian-Canadian Bassist, Frank Laugelli. The song "Searching" opens the album with its sad yet beautiful lyrics that describe a lost, lonely soul with simple acoustic guitar chords. The acoustic guitar with thoughtful lyrics was a trend that continued on the second track, "Percival" and the third track "In St. Peter's Day". The track "Once that I Prayed" then follows the more acoustic tracks with a more classically influenced style that was a recently adopted trait of the band. Next on the album is "A Land to Live a Land to Die", which follows the former classical ballad with a ratified organ and a stunningly strong lyrical performance from Nico Di Palo. The track "Giga", a short acoustic ballad leads into the track "To Edith", which had its lyrics taken from a Bertrand Russell poem.

Side 2 of the album was more of the Hard rock and Blues genre, and takes less classical influence unlike the first side. There are clear references and similarities to bands such as Deep Purple and Led Zeppelin on the tracks. The first track from side 2, "Intro" is a longer instrumental of the band members showing off their individual musicianship, followed by the much harder track "Bright Lights". The last two tracks are very different, the first being "Muddy Madalein", about a man who is walking in the street with his child and meets the prostitute that was his "first shot" and turns away due to being with his child. The last track is an over 17-minute epic "Lying Here" begins with classical interludes of flute and organ, then delves into a Deep Purple Hard Rock style for the remainder of the song. The former bassist Giorgio D'Adamo contributed on the tracks "Bright Lights" and "Muddy Madalein".

== Tracks ==
Disc 1
No.	Title	Lyrics	Music	Length
1.	"Searching"		De Scalzi, Belleno, Di Palo	4:45
2.	"Percival"		De Scalzi, Belleno, Di Palo	4:22
3.	"In St. Peter's Day"		De Scalzi, Salvi	5:00
4.	"Once That I Prayed"		De Scalzi, Rhodes, Salvi	4:00
5.	"A Land to Live a Land to Die"		De Scalzi, Rhodes, Di Palo	8:25
6.	"Giga"		De Scalzi	2:05
7.	"To Edith"	Bertrand Russell	De Scalzi, Di Palo	8:40

Total Duration: 37:17

Disc 2
No.	Title	Music	Length
8.	"Intro"	De Scalzi, Salvi, Di Palo	7:20
9.	"Bright Lights"	Rhodes, Belleno, Di Palo	6:45
10.	"Muddy Madalein"	De Scalzi, Rhodes, Di Palo	2:25
11.	"Lying Here"	De Scalzi, Rhodes, Belleno, Salvi, Di Palo	17:25

Total duration: 33:55

== Personnel ==
=== New Trolls ===
- Vittorio De Scalzi – Guitar, Synthesizer, vocals
- Nico Di Palo – Guitar, vocals
- Maurizio Salvi – Piano, Hammond Organ, Harpsichord
- Frank Laugelli "Rhodes" – Bass
- Gianni Belleno – Drums

=== Guest musicians ===
- Giorgio D'Adamo – Bass
