= Banco del Mutuo Soccorso (album) =

Studio album by Banco del Mutuo Soccorso
- Released: 3 May 1972
- Genre: Italian progressive rock
- Length: 41:40
- Label: Ricordi
- Producer: Sandro Colombini

Banco del Mutuo Soccorso chronology
Banco del Mutuo Soccorso (1972)	Darwin! (1972)

Professional ratings
Review scores
Source	Rating
Allmusic	4/5 stars

Banco del Mutuo Soccorso is the eponymous debut album by Italian progressive rock band Banco del Mutuo Soccorso.

The original cover was die-cut to be shaped like a piggy bank; a slit was extracted from a strip of cardboard with the faces of the members of the group. The image on the cover is by illustrator Mimmo Mellino.

== Track listing ==
Music by Vittorio Nocenzi. Lyrics by Vittorio Nocenzi and Francesco Di Giacomo.

Side one
No.	Title	Length
1.	"In volo (In Flight)"	2:13
2.	"R.I.P. (Requiescant in pace) (R.I.P. (Rest in Peace))"	6:40
3.	"Passagio (Passage)"	1:19
4.	"Metamorfosi (Metamorphosis)"	10:52

Side two
No.	Title	Length
1.	"Il giardino del mago (Garden of the Magician): "...Passo dopo passo..." (...Step by Step...); "...Chi ride e chi geme..." (...People Laugh and Groan...); "...Coi capelli sciolti al vento..." (...With Hair Loose in the Wind...); "Compenetrazione" (Interpenetration)"	18:26
2.	"Traccia (Track)"	2:10

== Personnel ==
- Vittorio Nocenzi – Organ, Harpsichord, clarino, vocals
- Gianni Nocenzi – Piano, E-flat clarinet, vocals
- Marcello Todaro – Electric guitar, acoustic guitar, vocals
- Renato D'Angelo – Bass
- Pier Luigi Calderoni – drums
- Francesco Di Giacomo – Lead vocals
