= La Caletta =

Coordinates: 40°36′35.57″N 9°45′2.23″E

La Caletta is a small town, a harbour and a tourist destination in Sardinia, Italy. Caletta means a small bay or little harbour.

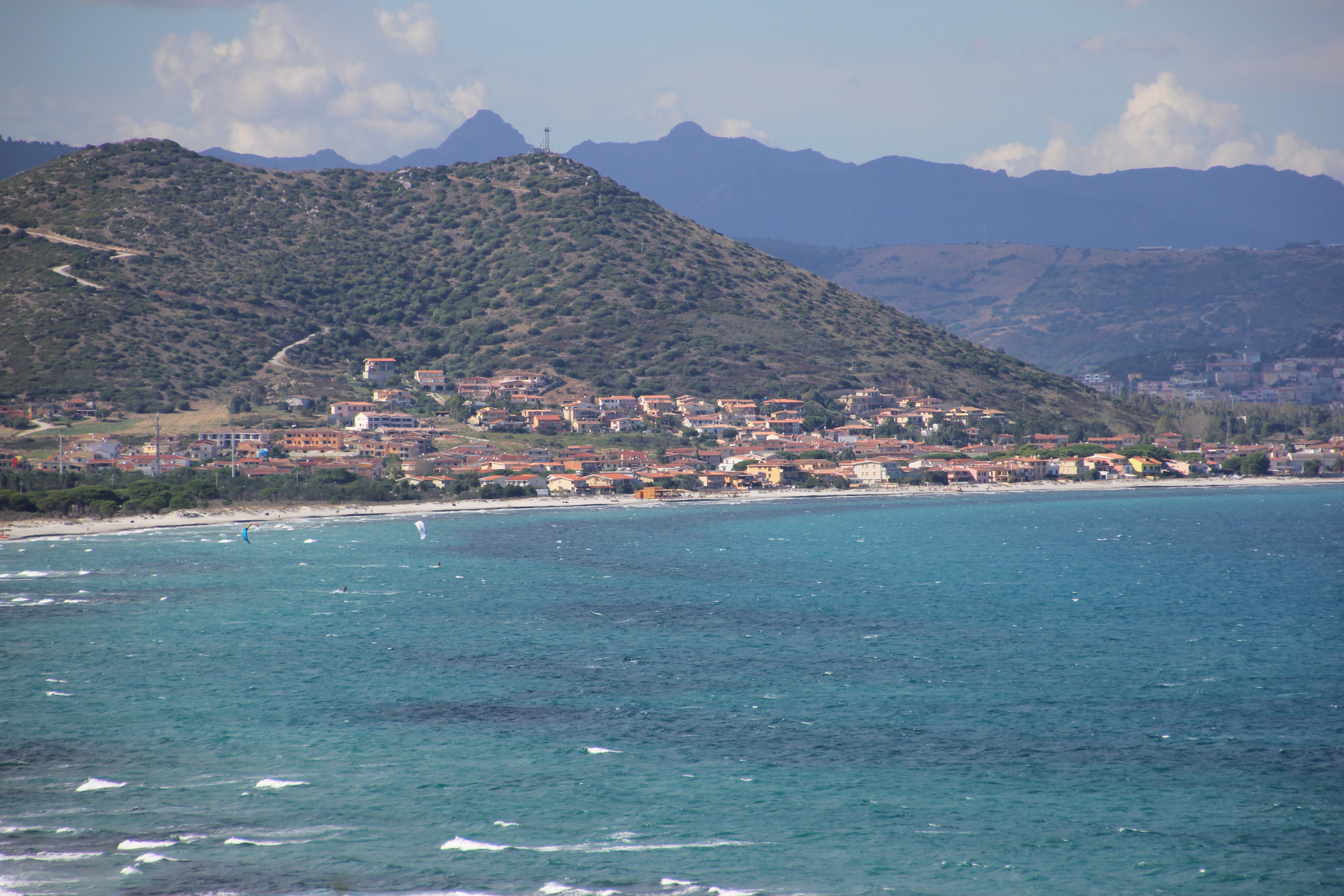
The beach and hillside villas

== Location ==
The town is located approximately 50 km south of Olbia, in the administrative territory of Siniscola (province of Nuoro), on the Tyrrhenian coast of the island.

It borders, at its northern side, with San Giovanni, the coastal fraction of Posada.

La Caletta is in front of a well known beach (appr. 10 km of pure white sand) that ends at the small town of Santa Lucia.

== History ==
An ancient village of fishermen, its small gulf has been transformed in the 1970s into a touristic harbour, and recently renewed and enlarged. The town (est. 1,000 inhabitants, that become more than 10,000 in Summer) is today deeply dependent on tourism.

The local church, dedicated to Nostra Signora di Fatima, was built in 1954.

== Proposed ferry service ==
Local population requires that La Caletta can have in its port a ferry line for the Continent (Italian mainland), and some experiments were practiced a few years ago, that confirmed the potential success of such an eventual initiative, but (also due to the particular administrative competence of an external organ and being part of the port under the authority of the bordering territory of Posada) administrative problems and local rivalries actually stop any further evolution in this sense.

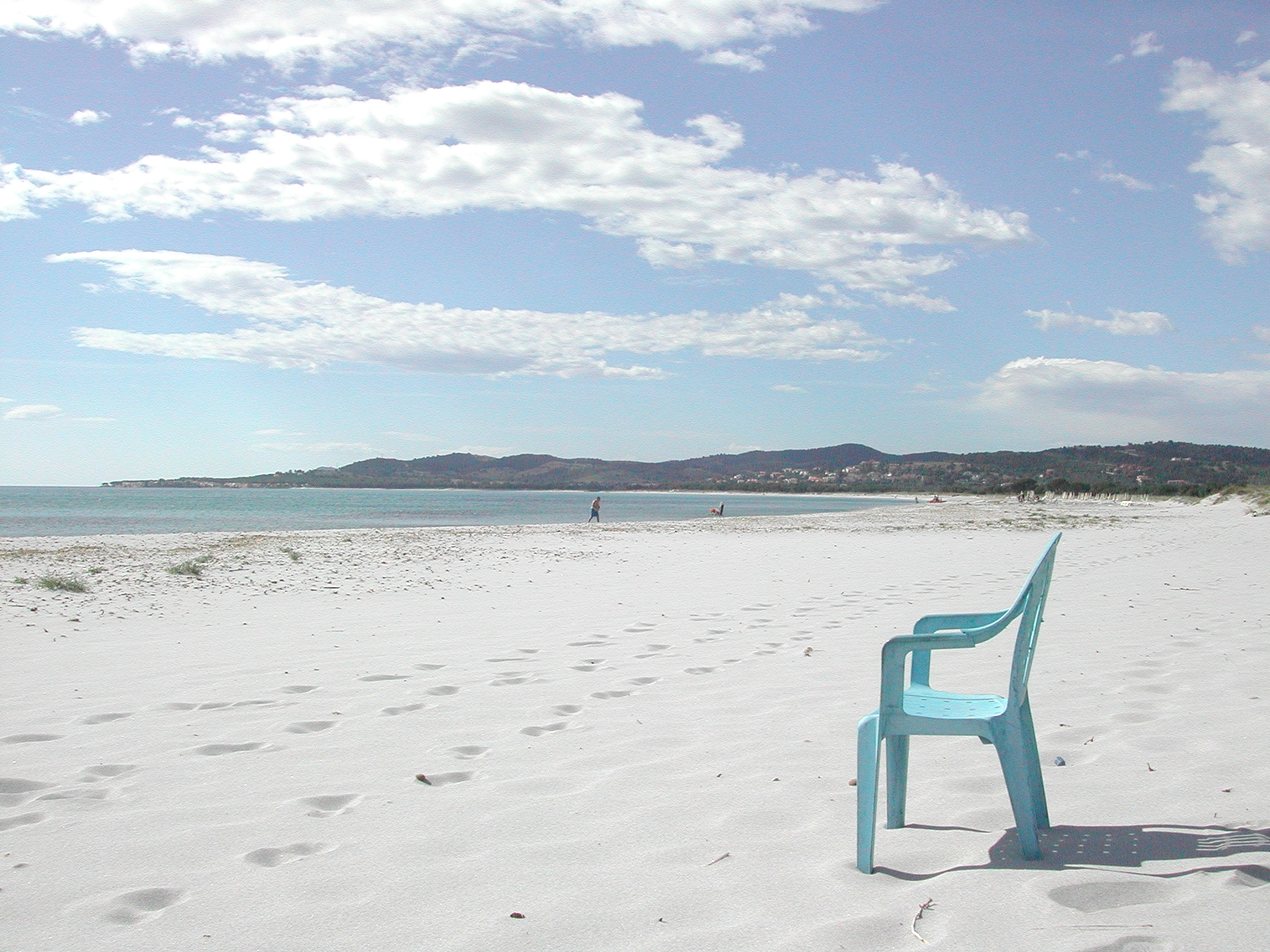
The beach of La Caletta
