= Wings of Love (Nova album) =

Studio album by Nova
- Released: 1977
- Recorded: June to July, 1977
- Studio: Trident Studios, London
- Genre: Progressive rock, jazz rock
- Length: 47:28
- Label: Arista
- Producer: Narada Michael Walden

Nova chronology
| Vimana (1976) | Wings of Love (1977) | Sun City (1978) |

Alternative cover
- US album cover

Wings of Love is the third album by the Italian progressive/jazz rock group Nova, that was released by Arista Records in 1977.

== Track listing ==
| No. | Title | Lyrics | Music | Length |
|---|---|---|---|---|
| 1. | "You Are Light" | Corrado Rustici | Rustici, Elio D'Anna | 6:20 |
| 2. | "Marshall Dillon" | | Rustici, Barry Johnson, Renato Rosset, D'Anna | 3:57 |
| 3. | "Blue Lake" | Ric Parnell | Rustici, D'Anna | 6:54 |
| 4. | "Beauty Dream - Beauty Flame" | | Rustici, D'Anna, Rosset | 6:25 |
| 5. | "Golden Sky Boat" | Rustici | Rustici, Johnson, D'Anna | 6:09 |
| 6. | "Lovliness About You" | Nick Sedgwick | Rustici | 5:55 |
| 7. | "Inner Star" | Parnell | Johnson, Rosset | 6:37 |
| 8. | "Last Silence" | | Johnson, Rosset | 5:11 |
| Total length: | | | | 47:28 |

== Personnel ==
- Elio D'Anna - soprano, tenor, alto and baritone saxophones, flutes
- Corrado Rustici - lead guitar, 6- and 12-string acoustic guitars, glockenspiel, triangle, gong, lead vocals
- Renato Rosset - Fender Rhodes piano, acoustic piano, mini moog, poly moog, clavinet, Hammond organ
- Barry Johnson - bass guitar, wind chimes, lead vocals on "Inner Star" and "You are Light"
- Ric Parnell - drums, percussion
- Nectar Smile Choir - backing vocals
