= Garofano rosso =

Studio album by Banco del Mutuo Soccorso
- Released: 1976
- Genre: Progressive rock
- Length: 41:40
- Label: Manticore
- Producer: David Zard & Banco del Mutuo Soccorso

Banco del Mutuo Soccorso chronology
Banco (1975)	Garofano rosso (1976)	Come in un'ultima cena (1976)

Professional ratings
Review scores
Source	Rating
Allmusic	2.5/5 stars

Garofano rosso is the fifth studio album by Italian progressive rock band Banco del Mutuo Soccorso. It is an instrumental soundtrack from the film with the same name.

== Track listing ==
Side one
No.	Title	Writer(s)	Length
1.	"Zobeida"	Vittorio Nocenzi	2:40
2.	"Funerale (Funeral)"	V. Nocenzi	4:28
3.	"10 giugno 1924 (June 10, 1924)"	Gianni Nocenzi	4:28
4.	"Quasi Saltarello"	V. Nocenzi	1:38
5.	"Esterno notte (Casa di Giovanna) (Outside at night (Giovanna's House))"	V. Nocenzi	3:15
6.	"Garofano Rosso (The red carnation)"	V. Nocenzi	5:02

Side two
No.	Title	Writer(s)	Length
1.	"Suggestioni di un ritorno in campagna (Suggestions of a return to the countryside)"	G. Nocenzi, V. Nocenzi	7:38
2.	"Passeggiata in bicicletta e corteo dei dimostranti (Bike ride and procession of the demonstrators)"	V. Nocenzi, G. Nocenzi	2:53
3.	"Tema di Giovanna (Giovanna's theme)"	V. Nocenzi	2:35
4.	"Siracusa: appunti d'epoca (Syracuse: old notes)"	V. Nocenzi	2:12
5.	"Notturno breve (Short night)"	V. Nocenzi	2:20
6.	"Lasciando la casa antica (Leaving the old house)"	G. Nocenzi, V. Nocenzi, Rodolfo Maltese	2:35

== Personnel ==
- Rodolfo Maltese – Electric guitar, acoustic guitar, trumpet, French horn
- Pier Luigi Calderoni – drums, percussion, timpani
- Renato D'Angelo – Bass, contrabass, acoustic guitar
- Gianni Nocenzi – Piano, electric piano, synthesizer, clarinet
- Vittorio Nocenzi – Organ, synthesizer, violin, vibraphone
