= Forse le lucciole non si amano più =

Studio album by La Locanda delle Fate
- Released: 1977
- Genre: Progressive rock
- Length: 49:35 LP; 54:11 CD
- Label: Polydor

La Locanda delle Fate chronology
Forse le lucciole non si amano più (1977)	Homo Homini Lupus (1999)

Professional ratings
Review scores
Source	Rating
Sputnikmusic	4.5/5 stars

Forse le lucciole non si amano più is the debut LP (1977) of Italian progressive rock band La Locanda delle Fate. The CD reissue was released 1994 with the bonus track "New York".

== Track listing ==
1. "A volte un istante di quiete" – 6:31
2. "Forse le lucciole non si amano più" – 9:48
3. "Profumo di colla bianca" – 8:25
4. "Cercando un nuovo confine" – 6:41
5. "Sogno di Estunno" – 4:41
6. "Non chiudere a chiave le stelle" – 3:34
7. "Vendesi saggezza" – 9:37
8. "New York"* – 4:35

Note: "New York" is only available on the 1994 CD reissue.

== Sources ==
- Page at Italianprog.com (in Italian)
