= Cervello =

Italian progressive rock band

- Origin: Naples, Italy
- Genres: Progressive rock
- Years active: 1972–1974; 2017–present
- Members: Corrado Rustici; Giulio D'Ambrosio; Antonio Spagnolo; Roberto Porta
- Past members: Gianluigi Di Franco; Remigio Esposito; Virginio Simonelli; Sasà Priore; Davide De Vito

Cervello ("Brain") is a band from Italy.

== History ==
Cervello was formed by musicians from Naples. Corrado Rustici, then 17 years old, was the younger brother of Danilo Rustici, who was the guitarist of another popular rock band from Naples of these years, the Osanna.

In 1973 the band released their sole album Melos, a brilliant Italian symphonic progressive rock production. The band show good mastery of their instruments, dazzling in sometimes over-complicated passages. Flutes and saxophones are often used to replace the keyboards and mellotron of many progressive works from this era.

In spite of critical praise the band broke up in 1974. Corrado Rustici, after a brief stint with the Osanna, and a lengthy tenure with Nova, started a successful career as a solo musician and producer. Gianluigi Di Franco collaborated with percussionist Tony Esposito in the early 1980s. He later dedicated himself to musicotherapy researches.

In 2017, three of the original members, Antonio Spagnolo, Giulio D’Ambrosio and Corrado Rustici performed a concert in Tokyo with new band members Virginio Simonelli (lead vocals), Sasà Priore (keyboards) and Davide De Vito (drums). This was released as a live CD and DVD Cervello - Live in Tokyo 2017.

In 2025, Corrado Rustici, Giulio D’Ambrosio, Antonio Spagnolo, and Roberto Porta released Chaire together with a live concert from 1973. The vocals on Chaire by Gianluigi Di Franco (who died in 2005) were restored from the original recordings.

== Discography ==
- Melos (1973)
- Cervello - Live in Tokyo 2017 (2019)
- Chaire and Live at Pomigliano D'Arco – 1973 (2025)

== See also ==
- Progressive rock
- Italian progressive rock
- Il Balletto di Bronzo
- Il Banco del Mutuo Soccorso
- La Locanda delle Fate
- Le Orme
- Osanna
- Nova
- La Premiata Forneria Marconi
- Il Rovescio della Medaglia
