= Notturno Concertante =

Italian progressive rock band

Notturno Concertante is an Italian neo-prog band established in 1984. It has since released five albums, and collaborated in several other projects, most notably with Tony Pagliuca (from Italian progressive band Le Orme) and Italian novelist and humorist Stefano Benni. Some of their compositions have also been used as soundtracks for Italian television shows.

The band was founded by Lucio Lazzaruolo (keyboards and guitar) and Raffaele Villanova (guitar) with Michele Iacoviello (percussions), Giancarmine Tammaro (vocals), and Enzo Matarazzo (flute). Their style includes influences from Van der Graaf Generator, Genesis, and other progressive rock bands from the 1970s, as well as folk music.

== Current lineup ==
- Giuseppe Relmi – vocals
- Raffaele Villanova – guitar, vocals
- Lucio Lazzaruolo – keyboard
- Carmine Marra – saxophone, flute, clarinet
- Carmine Meluccio – violin
- Giuseppe D'Alessio – bass guitar
- Simone Pizza – drums, percussions
- Gabriele Moscaritolo – harmonium

== Discography ==
- The Hiding Place (Musea 1989, republished by Mellow Records in 1992)
- Erewhon (Mellow Records 1993)
- News from Nowhere (Mellow Records 1993)
- The Glass Tear (Mellow Records 1994)
- Riscrivere il passato (Mellow Records 2002)

They also contributed to several progressive rock collections as well as to tribute albums dedicated to major progressive rock bands of the past, such as Genesis, Van der Graaf Generator, Camel, and King Crimson.
