= La Locanda delle Fate =

Locanda delle Fate
- Origin: Asti, Piedmont, Italy
- Genres: Progressive rock, symphonic rock
- Years active: 1974–1980; 1999–present
- Labels: Vinyl Magic, Polydor, AltrOck Productions
- Members: Leonardo Sasso; Luciano Boero; Giorgio Gardino; Oscar Mazzoglio; Maurizio Muha; Massimo Brignolo
- Past members: Ezio Vevey; Alberto Gaviglio; Michele Conta

Locanda delle Fate (The Fairy Inn) is an Italian progressive rock band from the end of the Italian progressive rock movement.

The band formed in 1974 and in 1975 the vocalist Leonardo Sasso entered the group. Despite good reviews, they encountered little success with their first album Forse le lucciole non si amano più (Polydor, 1977, reissued 1994 with bonus track) and disbanded in 1980 after releasing two further singles. Decades later the band reunited without their lead vocalist, releasing the album Homo Homini Lupus (1999).

== Original line-up ==
- Leonardo Sasso: lead vocals
- Ezio Vevy: 12-string guitar, acoustic guitar, electric guitar, vocals, flute
- Alberto Gaviglio: acoustic guitar, electric guitar, 12-string guitar, vocals
- Michele Conta: piano, Moog, clavinet, synthesizer
- Oscar Mazzoglio: Hammond, piano, Moog, synthesizer
- Luciano Boero: bass guitar, Hammond
- Giorgio Gardino: drums, vibraphone

== Discography ==
- Forse le lucciole non si amano più (1977) (LP)
- Vendesi Saggezza / Non Chiudere A Chiave Le Stelle / Cercando Un Nuovo Confine (12" Promotional)
- Non Chiudere A Chiave Le Stelle / Sogno Di Estunno (7")
- New York / Nove Lune (1978) (7")
- Annalisa / Volare Un Pò Più In Alto (1980) (7")
- Live (1993) (recording of 1977 performance) (CD)
- Homo Homini Lupus (1999) (CD)
- Live in Bloom - Progvention - Nov 6th 2010 (2010) (limited edition LP)
- The Missing Fireflies (2012) (CD/LP)
- Bloom Live - Nov 6th 2010 (2013) (CD+DVD)
- Mediterraneo (video/single) (2016)
- Lettera Di Un Viaggiatore (video/single) (2017)

=== See also ===
- Il Balletto di Bronzo
- Banco del Mutuo Soccorso
- Cervello
- Le Orme
- Osanna
- Nova
- Premiata Forneria Marconi
- Il Rovescio della Medaglia
