= New Trolls Atomic System =

Italian progressive rock band

New Trolls Atomic System were an Italian progressive rock band which released one record in the early 1970s, New Trolls Atomic System. The album spawned a single, "Una notte sul Monte Calvo", a symphonic rock cover of Modest Mussorgsky's A Night on Bare Mountain.

They were an offshoot from the band New Trolls.
