= Melos (Acarnania) =

Melos (Ancient Greek: Μῆλος) was a village of ancient Acarnania mentioned by Stephanus of Byzantium.

Its site is unlocated.
