= Santa Lucia (Siniscola) =

Santa Lucia is part of the municipality of Siniscola (NU) in Sardinia (Italy). It is a seaside village with two beaches and surrounded by a pine forest planted in the 30s. There is a tower that was probably built in the XVII century.

The village was populated by fishermen from the island of Ponza.

A regulatory plan involves the destruction of about 6 hectares (15 acres) of the pine forest for the construction of hotels and various services. There is currently a strong movement against the regulatory plan, with also judicial initiatives.

The village and the beaches in 1971 were the main locations of the film Le lys de mer, starring actress Carole André.

== The beach ==
The main beach is characterized by clear water, rocks and pebbles and is bordered by pinewood. The coastline is covered by junipers and lentisks. There are a number of rocky coves with shallow floors.

== Gallery ==
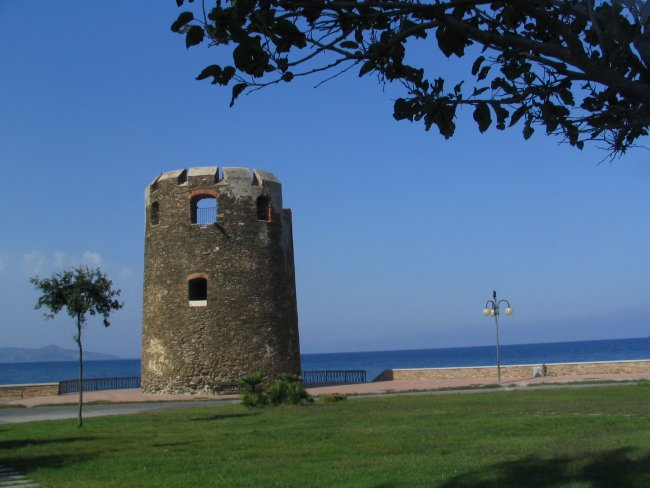
Tower inside the village

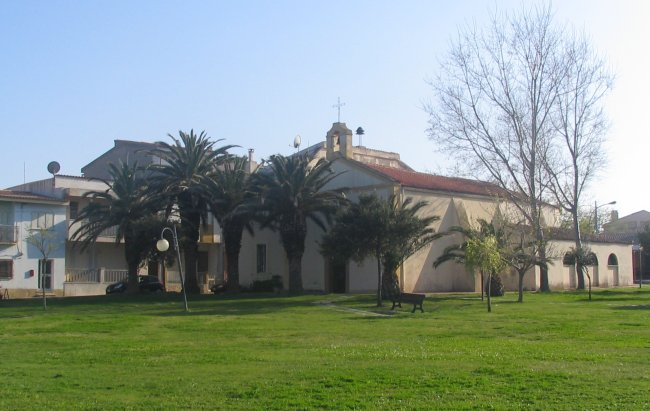
Church of Santa Lucia

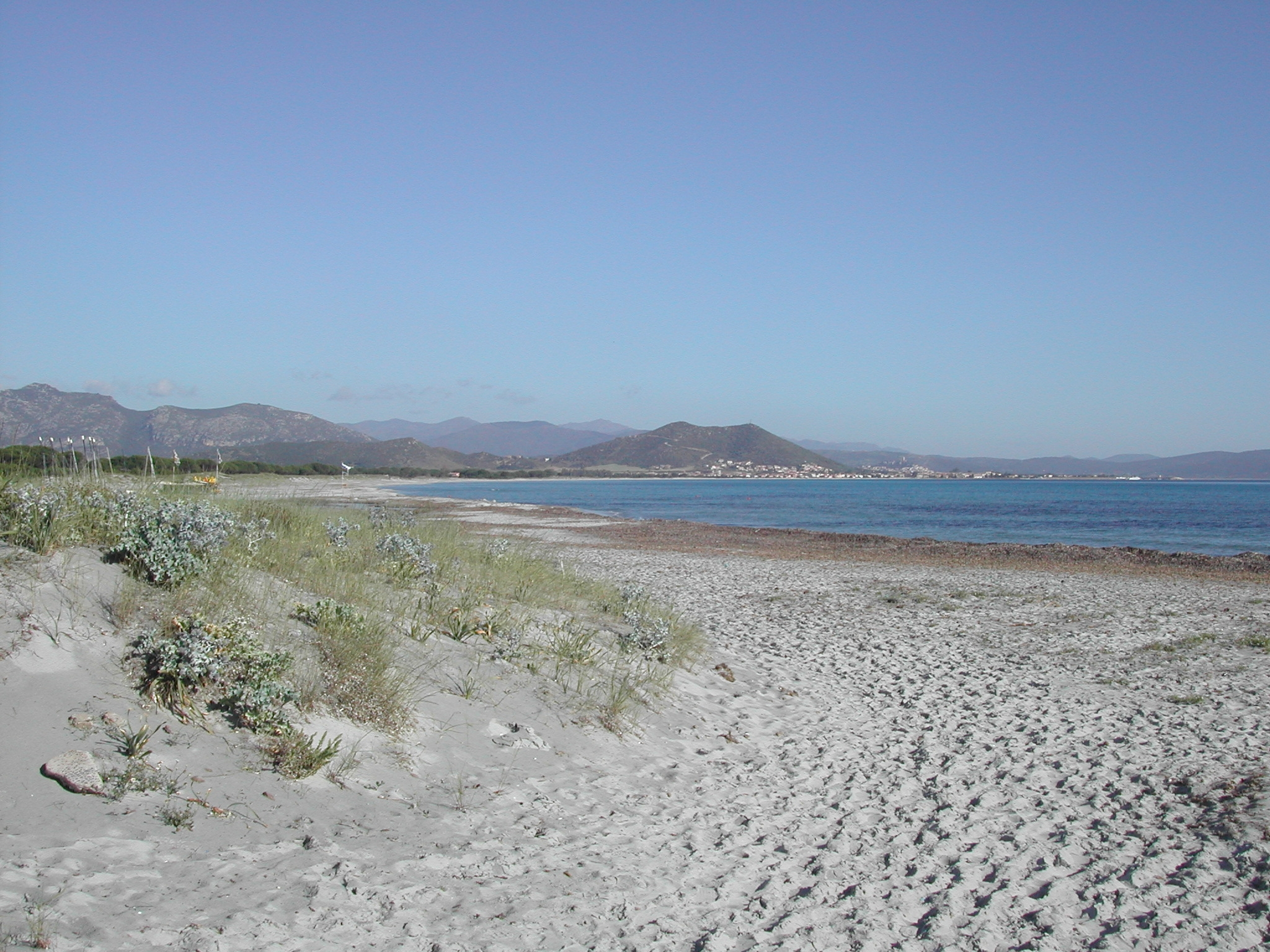
Beach in the north of Santa Lucia

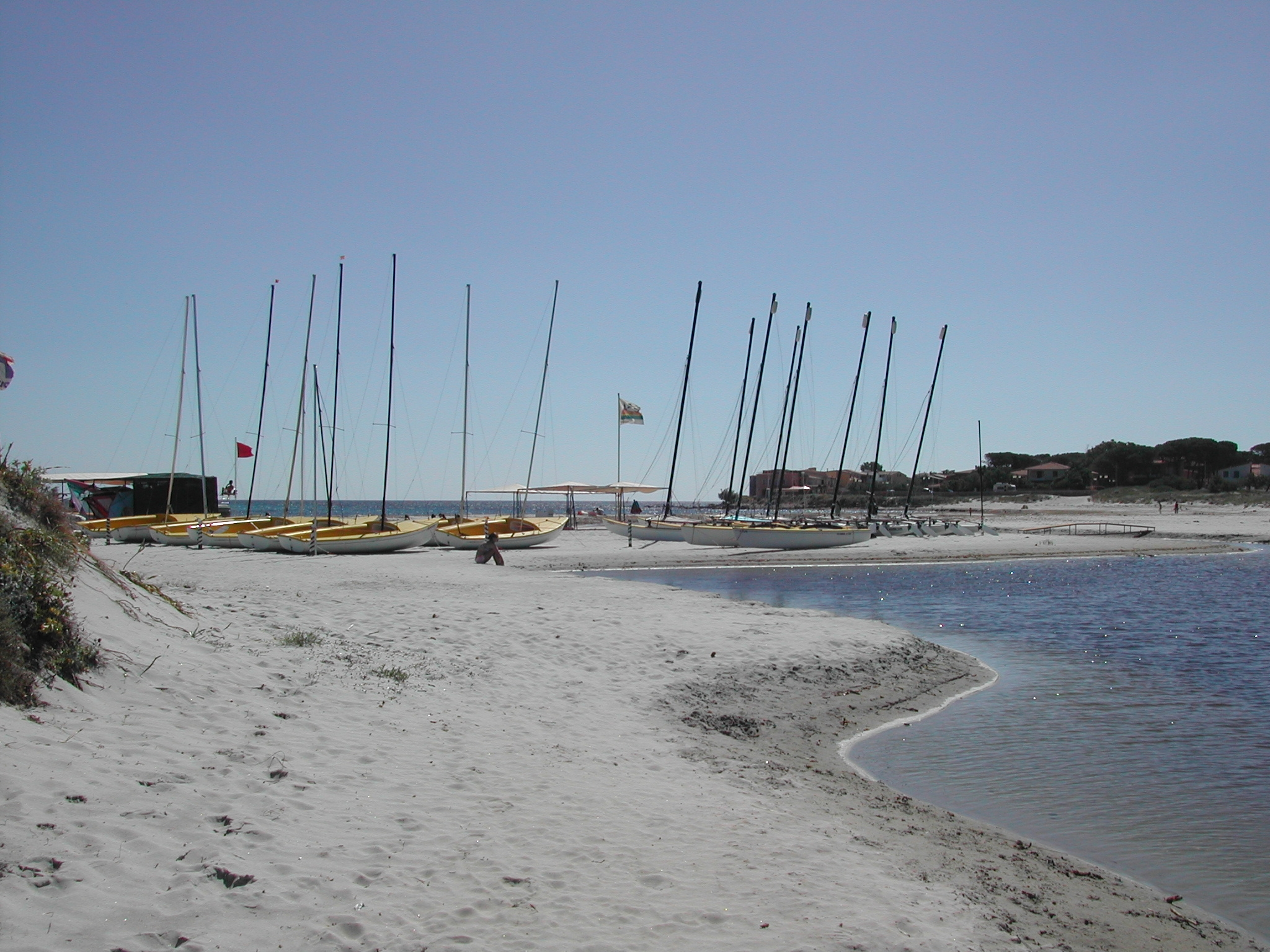
Beach in the north of Santa Lucia

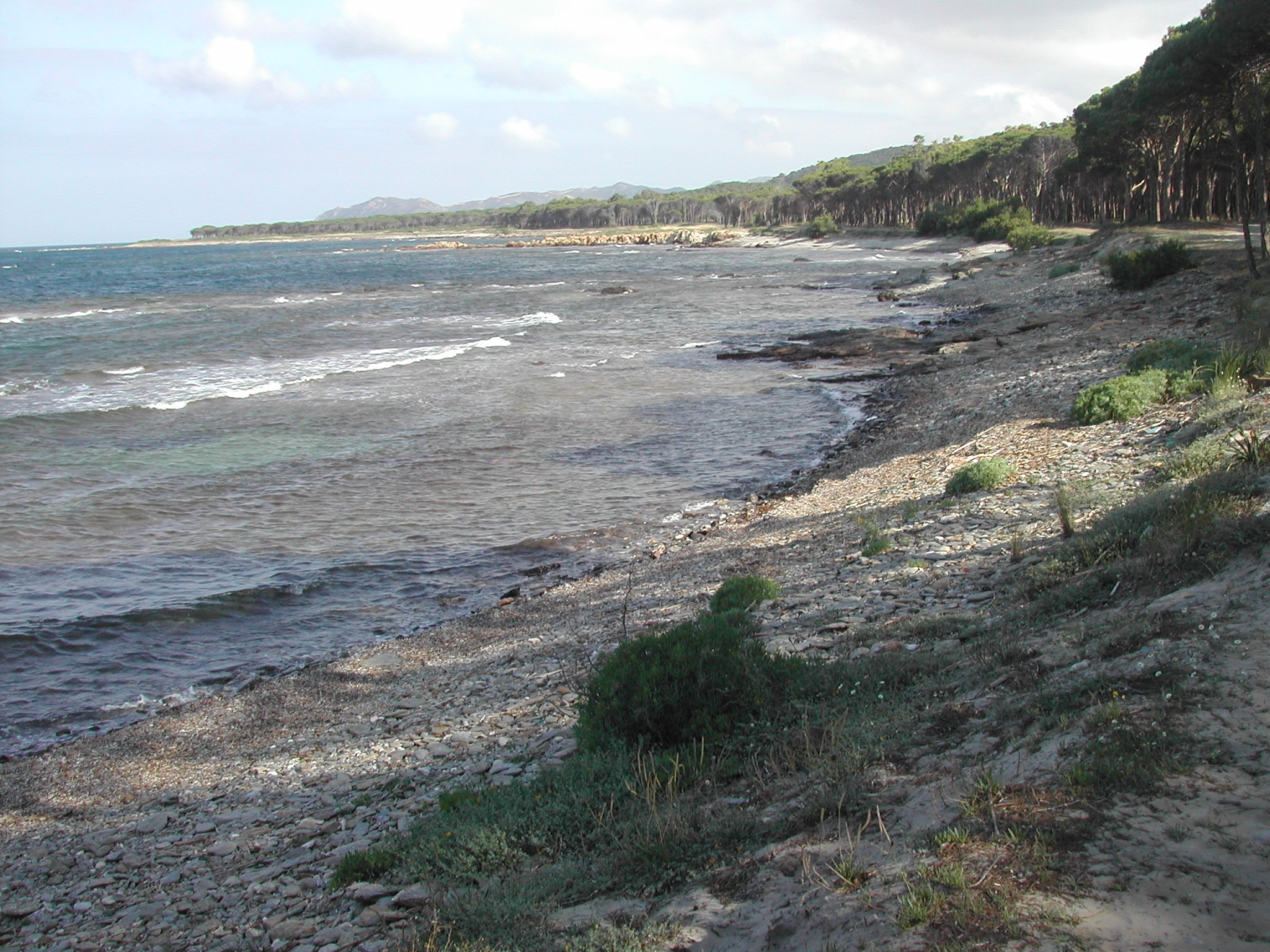
Beach in the south of Santa Lucia

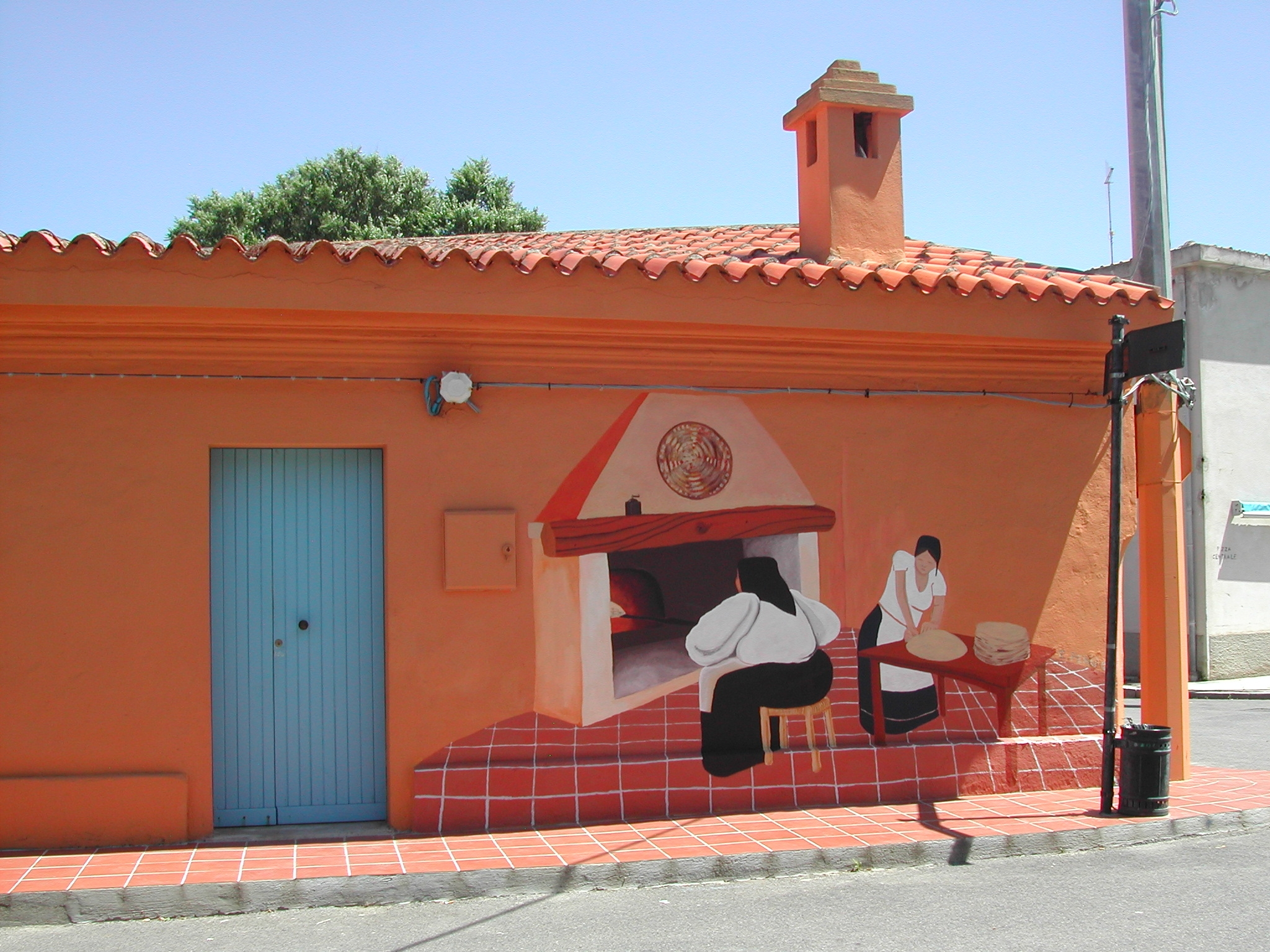
House with painting

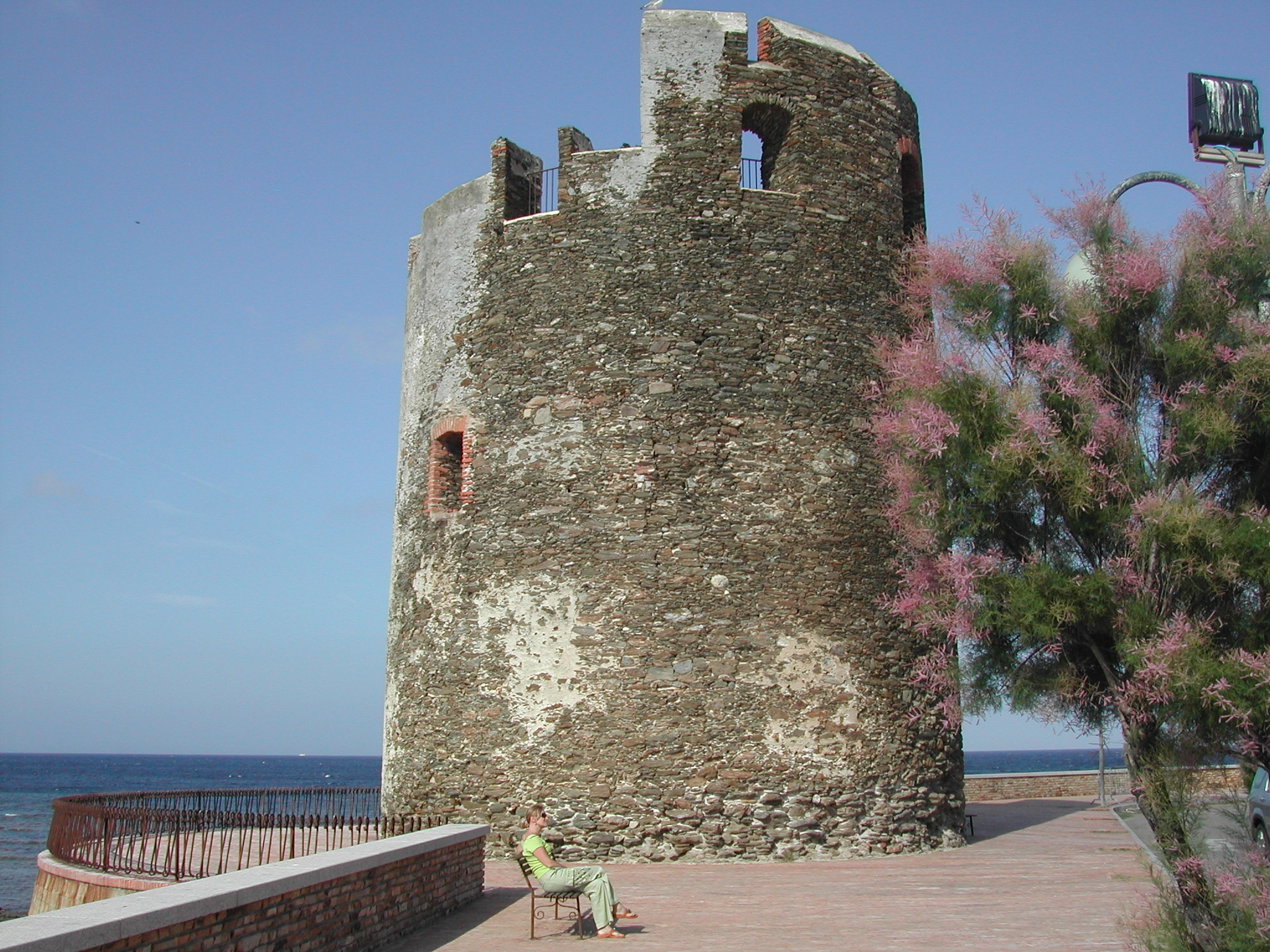
The tower

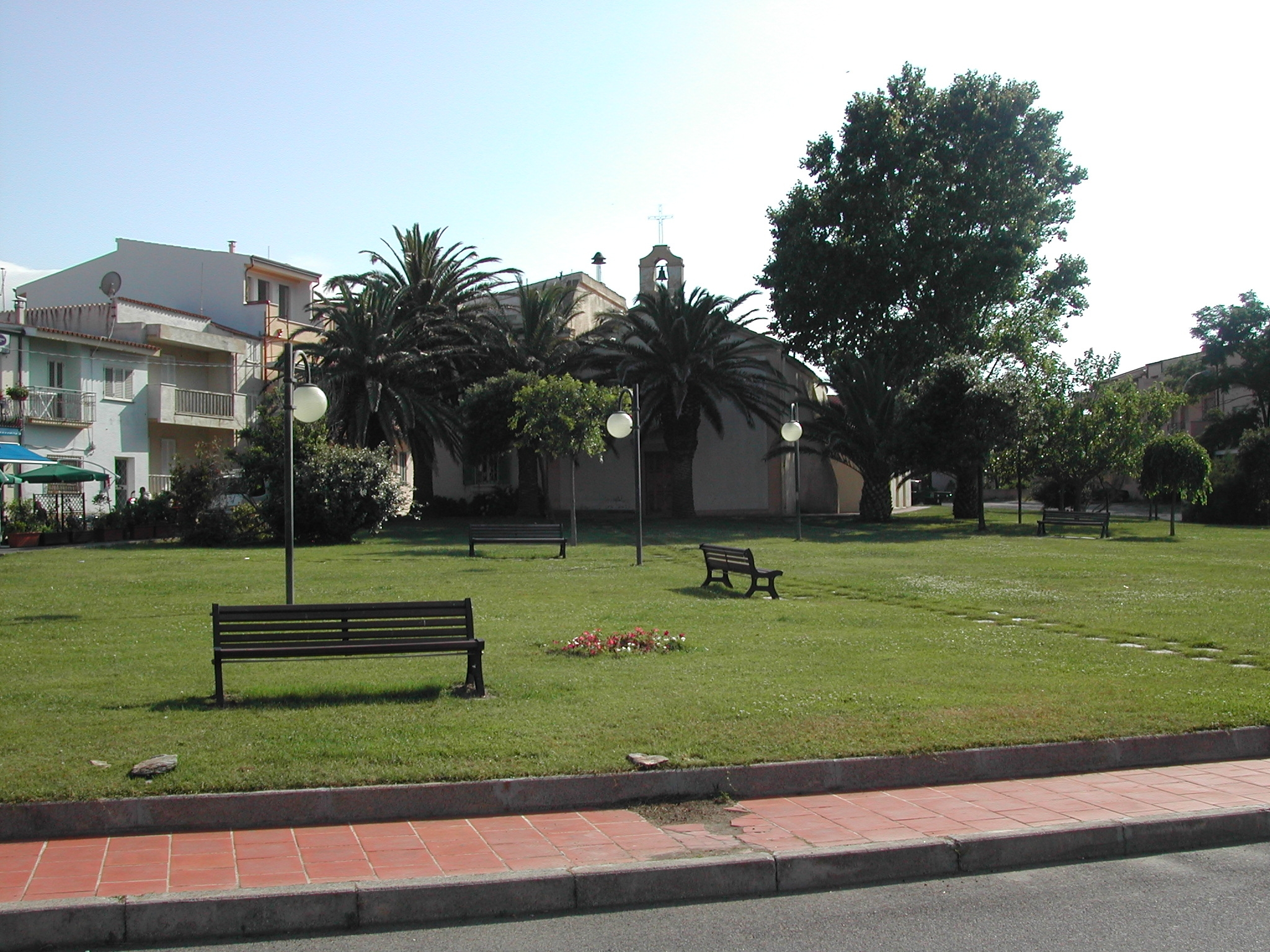
The church
