= Melos (album) =

Studio album by Cervello
- Released: 1973
- Recorded: 1973
- Genre: Progressive rock
- Label: BMG Records
- Producer: Danilo Rustici, Elio D'Anna

Melos is a progressive rock album released in 1973 by the Italian band Cervello.

The lyrics focus around an interpretation of the singing from a Greek mythology point of view. The music is a successful fusion of Mediterranean sounds with typical complex progressive rock ones, as well as with experimental parts. Flutes are dominant in much of the songs, as four members of the band played that instrument.

== Track listing ==
All music composed by Gian Pietro Marazza; all lyrics by Ermanno Parazzini

1. "Canto del capro" – 6:30
2. "Trittico" – 7:14
3. "Euterpe" – 4:27
4. "Scinsione (T.R.M)" – 5:39
5. "Melos" – 2:52
6. "Galassia" – 5:45
7. "Affresco" – 1:11

== Personnel ==
Cervello

- Corrado Rustici - guitar, vibes, flute, voice
- Giulio D'Ambrosio - flute, saxophone
- Gianluigi Di Franco - voice, flute, percussions
- Remigio Esposito - drums
- Antonio Spagnolo - bass, acoustic guitar, recorder
