= Le Orme =

Italian progressive rock band

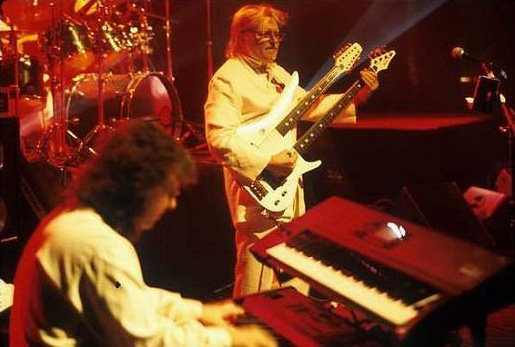

Background information
- Origin: Marghera, Venice, Italy
- Genres: Progressive rock, pop rock, psychedelic rock
- Years active: 1966–1982, 1986–present
- Labels: CAR Juke Box, Telerecord, Phonogram, PolyGram, Charisma, Baby, Crisler Music, Tring
- Members: Michi Dei Rossi; Michele Bon; Fabio Trentini
- Past members: Aldo Tagliapietra; Tony Pagliuca; Andrea Bassato; Francesco Sartori; Germano Serafin; Tolo Marton; Nino Smeraldi; Claudio Galieti; Marino Rebeschini

Le Orme (Italian: "The Footprints") is an Italian progressive rock band formed in 1966 in Marghera, a frazione of Venice. The band was one of the major groups of the Italian progressive rock scene in the 1970s. They are one of few Italian rock bands to have success outside their own country, having played concerts across North America and Europe, and releasing an album in English at the height of their success.

== History ==
=== Beginnings (1966–1970) ===
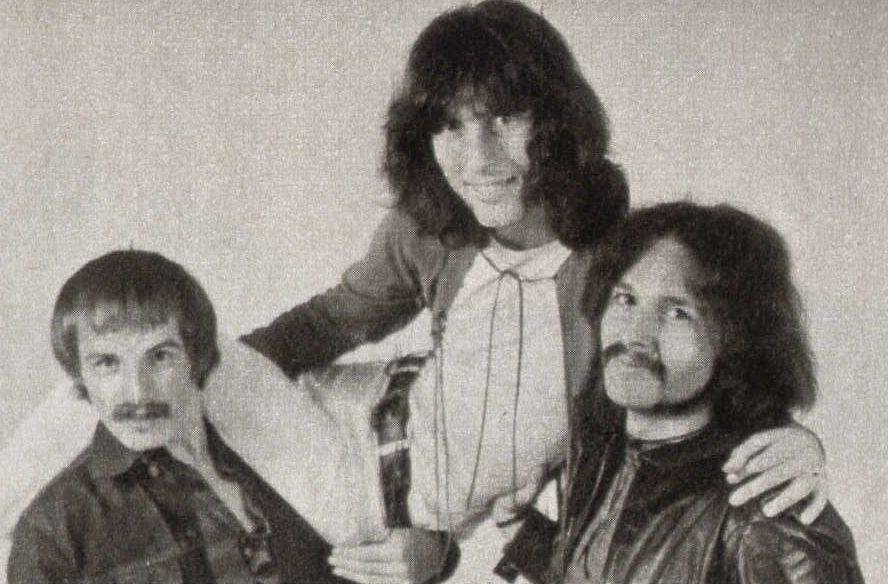
Le Orme in 1969

Le Orme was founded in 1966 in Venice by Aldo Tagliapietra (vocals, guitar), Marino Rebeschini (drums), Nino Smeraldi (lead guitar) and Claudio Galieti (bass guitar). Originally intending to name themselves Le Ombre, a literal translation of The Shadows, they ultimately decided on the similar-sounding Le Orme. The band's early work evoked a feel somewhere between beat and psychedelic rock, similar to what was coming out of the United Kingdom at the time. One of their first major performances was on 2 June 1966, when they and other local bands accompanied a British beat group, The Rokes, at the Teatre Corso in Mestre.

In 1967, the day after recording their first single, "Fiori e Colori", for Milan's CAR Juke Box label (having been rejected by EMI), Rebeschini left for the military. He was quickly replaced by Michi Dei Rossi of the dissolved Hopopi. The following year, their second single, "Senti l'estate che torna", was chosen to participate in Un disco per l'estate, a televised music competition organised by the Italian Phonographic Association and RAI. It was at this time that Tony Pagliuca (formerly of Hopopi and I Delfini) joined the group on keyboards. Later in the same year, the band began recording its first album, Ad gloriam, to be released in 1969. The title track was sampled by Irish DJ David Holmes for his 2000 album Bow Down to the Exit Sign, under the name "69 Police". It was then re-used in the Ocean's Eleven soundtrack, where it features prominently in the final scene. Soon Galieti left for the military as well, leaving Tagliapietra to cover on bass guitar. Not long after, Smeraldi left as well, leaving the trio that would be at the core of the band for its most successful era. An evolution in their sound towards more richness and complexity can already be heard in a non-album single the band would publish in 1970, "Il Profumo delle Viole / I Ricordi Più Belli".

=== Mainstream success (1970–1977) ===
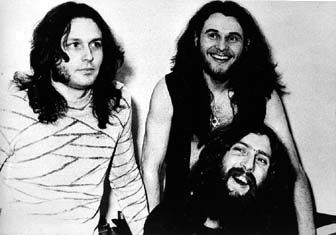
Le Orme in 1973

In the spring of 1971 Le Orme recorded their second studio album, Collage. Thanks to its promotion through the RAI radio program Per voi giovani, the album was quickly successful, earning a top 10 placing in the Italian charts. This was followed up with Uomo di pezza in 1972, which topped the Italian charts. Uomo di pezza also generated a hit single, "Gioco di bimba", and the band toured Italy in December 1972 with Peter Hammill of Van der Graaf Generator (VdGG being on hiatus at the time). It was with their next album however, Felona e Sorona, considered to be one of the "finest examples of Italian progressive rock", that Le Orme truly gained prominence beyond their home country. At the request of Tony Stratton Smith, Le Orme recorded an English version of Felona e Sorona for Charisma Records, with translation provided by Peter Hammill. The band toured the United Kingdom in support of the album, including dates at the Marquee Club and the Commonwealth Institute.

In January 1974, Le Orme recorded their first live album, In concerto at the Teatro Brancaccio in Rome. Later in the year a further studio album, Contrappunti, followed. It also was successful, charting in the top ten, but failed to reach the lofty heights achieved by Felona e Sorona. In 1975 Neil Kempfer-Stocker's Cosmos imprint issued Beyond Leng, a largely instrumental compilation to introduce the band to a wider American audience. The band then headed to Los Angeles to record their next album. At the same time, they hired a guitarist, Tolo Marton, bringing the group to four members. The resulting Smogmagica, boasting a cover by Paul Whitehead, was significantly more commercially oriented than their previous work, and was largely viewed as a disappointment by fans. Marton left soon after the album was completed, and Germano Serafin was recruited in his stead. The following album, however, Verita nascoste, was a return to form and would prove to be a high point as the band would soon suffer from the downturn in progressive rock's popularity.

=== Changes in direction (1977–1982) ===
Following the release of their eight studio album, Storia o leggenda, Le Orme retired from touring to focus on exploring new directions for their music. The result was 1979's Florian in which the band members traded in their electric instruments for classical ones, emerging with a sound more akin to chamber music than rock. The album was critically acclaimed, winning an Italian Music Critics' Award. They followed up with Piccola rapsodia dell'ape, which, although stylistically similar was not nearly as successful. Reverting to their classic trio formation, the band attempted to return to the mainstream with a straight-pop effort, Venerdi. This album was also unsuccessful, and the band split amiably following its release.

=== Reformation (1986–1992) ===
Le Orme would reform in 1986, intending to play concerts only. They were soon persuaded to enter a single, "Dimmi che cos'e", at the 37th annual Sanremo Music Festival, where it finished seventeenth. Though concentrating their efforts on concerts, the band released another studio album, titled simply Orme, in 1990. Another pop effort, the disc went largely unnoticed. In 1992, Pagliuca ended more than two decades with the band to be replaced by Michele Bon. Later the same year the band added Francesco Sartori on piano.

=== Return to form (1992–2009) ===
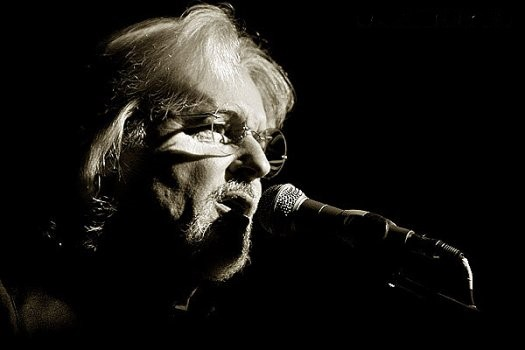
Aldo Tagliapietra (2007)

Encouraged by the success of their concerts and strong sales of their 1970–1980 anthology, the band returned to the recording studio. The result was 1995's Il fiume, a "triumphant return" to the sound that made them famous more than twenty years before. A string of concerts, culminating in appearances at progressive rock festivals in Los Angeles, Quebec City and Mexico City, followed. Two further albums were released, Elementi in 2001 and L'infinito in 2004, completing with Il fiume a trilogy around the concept of the "becoming" of the human being. Le Orme headlined NEARFest 2005, and later returned to a trio formation, playing concerts both inside and outside Italy.

=== Post Tagliapietra (2009–) ===
At the end of 2009, Aldo Tagliapietra left the band. He was replaced as lead singer by Jimmy Spitaleri of fellow Italian progressive rock band Metamorfosi. In 2011 the group released La via della seta, a concept album inspired by the Silk Road, with lyrics written by Maurizio Monti, former collaborator of Patty Pravo, Mina and Riccardo Cocciante. With the new organic, Le Orme started a tournée, sharing the stage with Banco del Mutuo Soccorso to promote the new album.

== Discography ==
Studio albums (excluding compilation LPs)

- Ad gloriam (1969)
- Collage (1971)
- Uomo di pezza (1972)
- Felona e Sorona (1973)
  Later re-recorded in English and released in the UK as Felona and Sorona.
- Contrappunti (1974)
- Smogmagica (1975)
- Verita nascoste (1976)
- Storia o leggenda (1977)
- Florian (1979)
- Piccola rapsodia dell'ape (1980)
- Venerdi (1982), a.k.a. Biancaneve (1994)
- Orme (1990)
- Il fiume (1996)
- Amico di ieri (1997)
- Elementi (2001)
- L'infinito (2004)
- La via della seta (2011)
- Felona e Sorona 2016 (2016)
- Sulle ali di un sogno (2019)

Live albums

- In Concerto (1974, live)
- Live in Pennsylvania (Le Orme) (2008, live)

Compilations

- Beyond Leng (1976)

== See also ==
Other Italian progressive rock bands:

- Il Balletto di Bronzo
- Banco del Mutuo Soccorso
- I Cervello
- La Locanda delle Fate
- Notturno Concertante
- Osanna
- Nova
- Premiata Forneria Marconi
- Il Rovescio della Medaglia
