= Francesco Di Giacomo =

Italian singer (1947–2014)

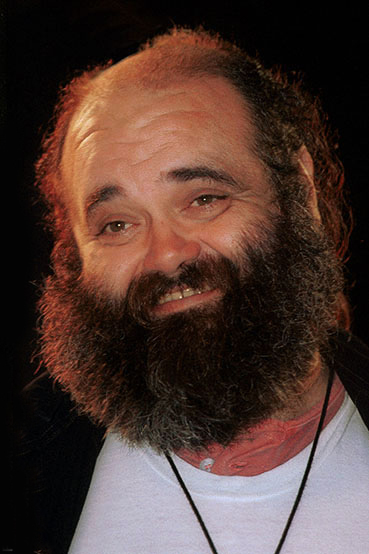
- Di Giacomo in 2014
- Born: 22 August 1947; La Caletta, Nuoro, Italy
- Died: 21 February 2014 (aged 66); Zagarolo, Rome, Italy
- Occupation: Singer

Francesco Di Giacomo (22 August 1947 – 21 February 2014) was an Italian singer and lyricist. He was the lead vocalist of the progressive rock band Banco del Mutuo Soccorso from 1971 to 2013.

== Life and career ==
Born in La Caletta, a frazione of Siniscola in Sardinia, at 5 years old Di Giacomo moved to Rome with his family. He knew keyboardist Vittorio Nocenzi during the 1971 Caracalla Pop Festival, and they formed the progressive rock band Banco del Mutuo Soccorso, which made its recording debut one year later, getting critical acclaim and commercial success. Di Giacomo served as lead vocalist as well as lyricist for most of the group's repertoire. His solo collaborations include Sam Moore, Eugenio Finardi, Elio e le Storie Tese, Kenze Neke, Piotta, Edoardo De Angelis and Bud Spencer Blues Explosion. Besides his musical career, he played bit parts in Federico Fellini's films Fellini Satyricon, Roma and Amarcord.

He died on 21 February 2014 in a car accident. His solo album La parte migliore was released posthumously in 2019.
