= Aldo Tagliapietra =

Italian singer, songwriter and musician (born 1945)

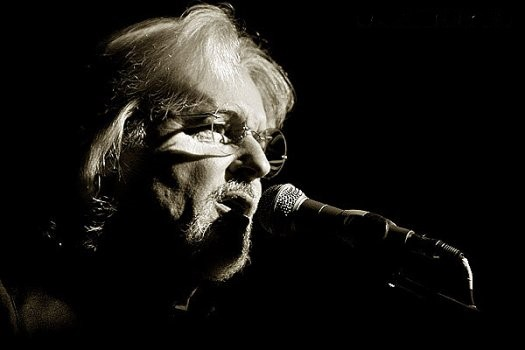

Background information
- Born: February 20, 1945 (age 81); Murano, Italy
- Genres: Progressive rock, pop rock
- Occupations: Musician, songwriter
- Instruments: Guitar, sitar, vocals, bass
- Years active: 1966–present
- Formerly of: Le Orme
- Website: aldotagliapietra.it

Aldo Tagliapietra (born February 20, 1945) is an Italian singer, songwriter and musician best known for his work with the progressive rock band Le Orme.

== Biography ==
Aldo Tagliapietra was born in Murano on February 20, 1945. The son of a master glassmaker, he graduated in theory and solfeggio at the Conservatory of Padua. He formed his first band in 1962 (The Corals) and in 1966 formed Le Orme. Le Orme went on to become one of the most widely recognised Italian progressive rock acts, and were active until 1982 when the group went on hiatus.

In 1984 Tagliapietra released his first solo album ...nella notte. Le Orme reformed in 1986, releasing four albums over the next 23 years. In 1994 Tagliapietra travelled to India where he began to study sitar under Budhaditya Mukherje. The sitar was to feature on the Le Orme albums Il Fiume and L'Infinito as well as his 2008 solo album Il Viaggio.

In 2009 Tagliapietra left Le Orme after a tour of Canada. He joined with other former Le Orme members Tolo Marton and Toni Pagliuca to perform in "Prog Exhibition", a concert celebrating forty years of progressive rock in Italy, in 2010. In 2012 Tagliapietra released a new studio album Nella pietra e nel Vento.

== Discography ==
- ...nella notte (1984)
- Radio Londra (1992, live)
- Il Viaggio (2008)
- Unplugged (2011, live)
- Unplugged Cofanetto (2011, live)
- Nella pietra e nel Vento (2012)
- L'angelo rinchiuso (2013)
- Invisibili realtà (2017)
