= Boris Bele =

Slovenian and Yugoslav musician

- Born: 18 April 1949 (age 77); Gračac, PR Croatia, FPR Yugoslavia
- Genres: Avant-garde rock; progressive rock; new wave; rock and roll; alternative rock
- Occupations: Musician; songwriter; music producer
- Instruments: Guitar; vocals
- Years active: Early 1970s–present
- Labels: ZKP RTLJ; PGP-RTB; Helidon; Racman; Croatia Records
- Formerly of: Sedem Svetlobnih Let; Buldožer

Boris Bele (born 18 April 1949) is a Slovenian and Yugoslav musician, songwriter and music producer, best known as guitarist and vocalist of the popular rock band Buldožer.

Rising to prominence on the Yugoslav rock scene in early 1970s as the leader of the group Sedem Svetlobnih Let, Bele gained nationwide popularity as vocalist and guitarist of the avant-rock band Buldožer. Bele was one of two mainstay members of Buldožer throughout the group's career, the other being keyboardist Borut Činč. After the band's original vocalist Marko Brecelj left the band in 1979, Bele took over the role of Buldožer lead vocalist. With Buldožer Bele has recorded six studio albums and a live album during the group's original 1975–1983 run, and one more studio album after the group reunited in the 1990s. Additionally, he has recorded one studio album with his band Duhovi.

In addition to producing most of Buldožer albums, Bele has worked as producer with Lačni Franz, Film, Elvis J. Kurtović & His Meteors, Sokoli, Peter Lovšin and Don Mentony Band. He was an editor for the independent record label Helidon, signing a number of prominent Yugoslav acts for the label.

== Biography ==
=== Early career (early 1970s–1975) ===
Boris Bele started his career in early 1970s as a member of the band Sinovi (The Sons). Later he formed the progressive rock band Sedem Svetlobnih Let (Seven Light Years) with keyboardist Borut Činč, bass guitarist Andrej Veble, guitarist Dušan Žiberna, drummer Jani Tutta and vocalist Andrej Trobentar, the band gaining moderate attention of the Yugoslav public.

=== Buldožer (1975–1983, 1991–1999, 2006) ===
Bele formed Buldožer in 1975 with Činč, Veble, vocalist Marko Brecelj, guitarist Uroš Lovšin and drummer Štefan Jež. The band blended progressive rock with elements of different genres, musical parodies, satirical lyrics, dark humor and self-irony, releasing their debut album Pljuni istini u oči (Spit into the Eyes of Truth) in 1975. After recording the band's second album Zabranjeno plakatirati (Postering Forbidden) and the mini soundtrack album Živi bili pa vidjeli (Live to Tell) with Buldožer, Brecelj departed from the group. Bele took over the role of the band's frontman, and the group recorded three more studio albums, Izlog jeftinih slatkiša (Shop Window of Cheap Candy, 1980), Rok end roul (Rock and Roll, 1981) and Nevino srce (Innocent Heart, 1983), and a live album, Ako ste slobodni večeras (If You're Free Tonight, 1982). After releasing Nevino srce, the band went on hiatus, Bele moving to Belgrade, where he worked as Helidon representative.

Buldožer reunited at the beginning of the 1990s, releasing their comeback album Noć (Night) in 1995. They disbanded once again at the end of the decade, reuniting once more, in 2006, in order to mark the release of their eight-piece box set Lik i djelo (Biography and Works).

=== Other works ===
In 2010s, Bele started the band Duhovi (The Ghosts), featuring Luka Vehar (guitar), Miklaž Avčić (bass guitar), and Žiga Kožar (drums). With Duhovi Bele recorded the album Duhovi bolje prošlosti (Ghosts of Better Past), released in 2018 through Croatia Records.

Bele wrote the song "Zlobni starci" ("Mean Old Men") for the Novi Sad band Neron, released on the group's 2012 album of the same title.

=== Album production ===
Bele has produced four studio albums and the only live album by Buldožer. Additionally, he has produced albums by Lačni Franz, Film, Elvis J. Kurtović & His Meteors, Sokoli, Peter Lovšin and Don Mentony Band.

=== Record label editor ===
In 1980, Bele became an editor in the independent record label Helidon. As the label's editor he signed a number of later-successful acts, including Na Lepem Prijazni, Film, Lačni Franz, Luna, Mizar, Let 3, KUD Idijoti, and others. For a period of time, he was an editor in the record label Racman.

== Legacy ==
In 1998, Pljuni istini u oči was ranked as the 7th and Izlog jeftinih slatkiša was ranked as the 55th on the list of 100 Greatest Albums of Yugoslav Popular Music in the book YU 100: najbolji albumi jugoslovenske rok i pop muzike (YU 100: The Best Albums of Yugoslav Pop and Rock Music). In 2015, Ako ste slobodni večeras was polled No.17, Pljuni istini u oči was polled No.19 and Izlog jeftinih slatkiša was polled No.41 on the list of 100 Greatest Yugoslav Albums published by the Croatian edition of Rolling Stone. In 1987, in YU legende uživo (YU Legends Live), a special publication by Rock magazine, Ako ste slobodni večeras was proclaimed one of 12 best Yugoslav live albums.

In 2000, Buldožer song "Novo vrijeme" was polled No.91 on the Rock Express Top 100 Yugoslav Rock Songs of All Times list. In 2006, two of the band's songs appeared on the B92 Top 100 Yugoslav songs list: "Novo vrijeme", polled No.76, and "Ne brini, mama" ("Don't Worry, Mom"), polled No.98.

Bele's lyrics for Buldožer songs "Slovenija" ("Slovenia"), "Mrtvaci" ("Dead Men") and "Vojno lice" ("Army Member") were included in Petar Janjatović's Pesme bratstva, detinjstva & potomstva: Antologija ex YU rok poezije 1967 - 2007 (Songs of Brotherhood, Childhood & Offspring: Anthology of Ex YU Rock Poetry 1967 – 2007).

== Discography ==
=== With Buldožer ===
==== Studio albums ====
- Pljuni istini u oči (1975)
- Zabranjeno plakatirati (1977)
- Živi bili pa vidjeli (1979)
- Izlog jeftinih slatkiša (1980)
- Rok end roul (1981)
- Nevino srce (1983)
- Noć (1995)

==== Live albums ====
- Ako ste slobodni večeras (1982)

==== Compilation albums ====
- Nova vremena (1989)
- The Ultimate Collection (2009)

==== Box sets ====
- Lik i djelo (2006)

==== Singles ====
- "Rastem" / "Svaki čovjek ima svoj bluz" (1975)
- "Žene i muškarci" / "Slovinjak punk" (1980)

=== With Duhovi ===
==== Studio albums ====
- Duhovi bolje prošlosti (2018)

=== As producer ===
- Buldožer – Živi bili pa vidjeli (1979)
- Buldožer – Izlog jeftinih slatkiša (1980)
- Buldožer - Rok end rol (1981)
- Film – Novo! Novo! Novo! Još jučer samo na filmu a sada i u vašoj glavi (1981)
- Lačni Franz – Ikebana (1981)
- Buldožer – Ako ste slobodni večeras (1982)
- Lačni Franz – Adijo pamet (1982)
- Buldožer – Nevino srce (1983)
- Lačni Franz – Ne mi dihat za ovratnik (1983)
- Lačni Franz – Slišiš, školjka poje ti (1983)
- Lačni Franz – Slon med porcelanom (1984)
- Elvis J. Kurtović & His Meteors – Da bog da crk'o rok'n'rol (1985)
- Sokoli – Marija pomagaj (1990)
- Peter Lovšin & Vitezi O'bložene Mize – Hiša nasprot sonca (1993)
- Don Mentony Band – Lenoba (1995)
