= Slamnig =

Slamnig is a surname. Notable people with the surname include:

- Davor Slamnig (born 1956), Croatian writer and musician
- Ivan Slamnig (1930–2001), Croatian writer
