= Psihomodo Pop =

Croatian pop punk group

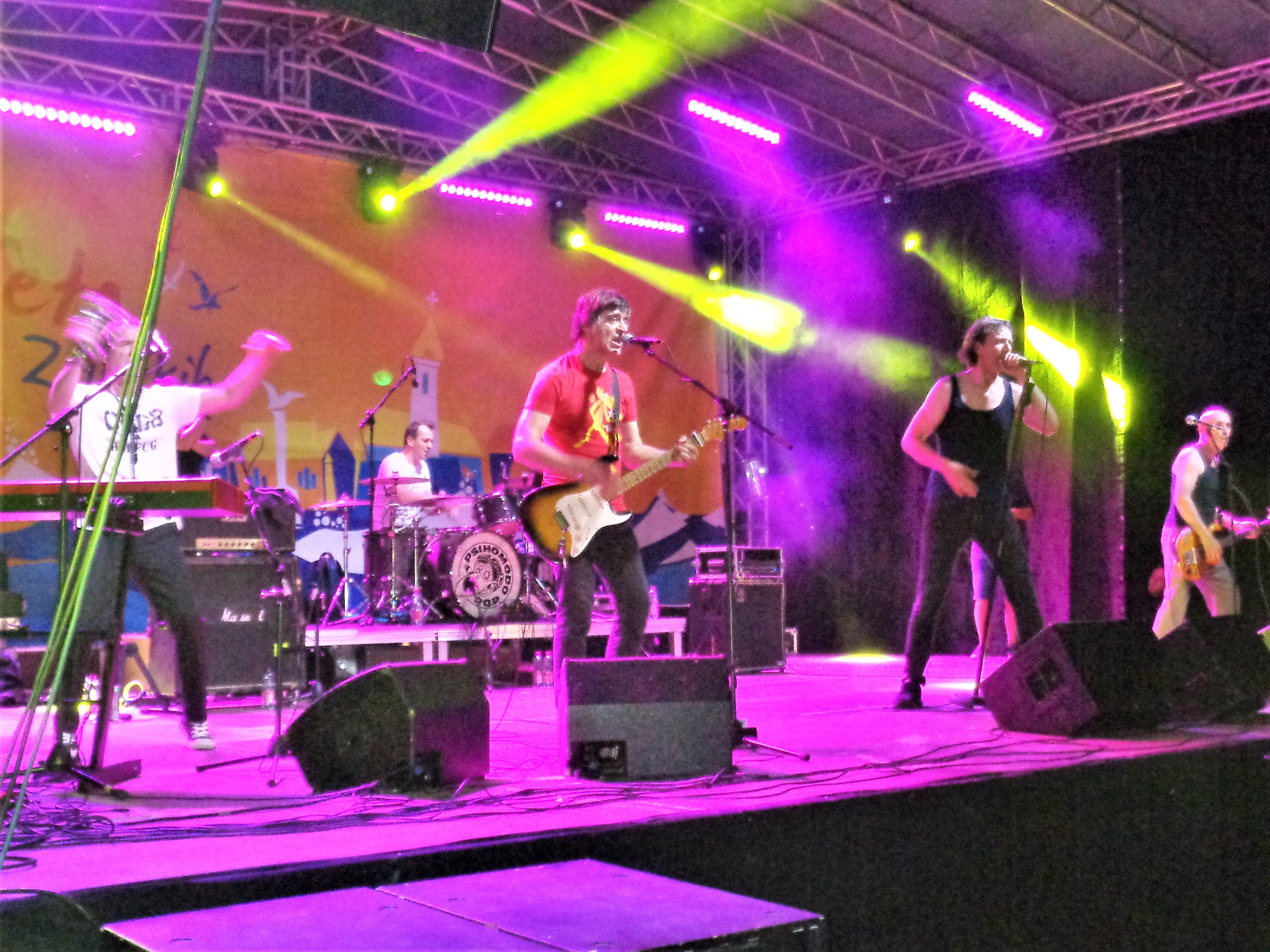
- Psihomodo Pop performing live in 2019

Background information
- Origin: Zagreb, Croatia
- Genres: Punk rock; pop-punk; garage rock; alternative rock
- Years active: 1982–present
- Labels: Jugoton, Croatia Records
- Members: Davor Gobac; Smiljan Paradiš; Vlatko Ćavar; Jurij Novoselić; Tin Ostreš
- Past members: Neven Kepeski; Tigran Kalebota; Branko Banjeglav; Davor Slamnig; Saša Novak Radulović
- Website: www.psihomodopop.hr

Psihomodo Pop is a Croatian and Yugoslav rock band formed in Zagreb in 1982.

Psihomodo Pop gained the attention of Yugoslav public and media in the mid-1980s with their Ramones-influenced punk rock sound, energetic live performances, and cross-dressing image of their frontman Davor Gobac. The band released their debut album Godina zmaja in 1988, achieving nationwide popularity. During 1989 and 1990, the band performed abroad, attracting the attention of international media. Their second studio album Sexy magazin, released in 1990, repeated the success of their debut and maintained their mainstream popularity in Yugoslavia. After the dissolution of Yugoslavia, the band continued their activity in independent Croatia by releasing several commercially successful albums, turning towards garage and alternative rock. On their recent releases, the band returned towards their early rock and roll-influenced sound. Psihomodo Pop has released 12 studio albums up to date, featuring a number of popular covers of songs by international artists, and has maintained a cult following in all former Yugoslav republics.

== History ==
=== Formation and rise to prominence (1982–1988) ===
Psihomodo Pop was formed in 1982 from the remnants of bands Neron (Nero), Rokfeler (Rockefeller) and Klinska Pomora (Cas Ghamber). The original lineup of the band featured vocalist Davor Gobac, guitarist Neven Kepenski (at the time also a journalist for the magazine Polet), bass guitarist Smiljan Paradiš "Šparka", drummer Tigran Kalebota and saxophonist Branko Banjeglav, all of them 18 years old at the time. They chose the band name after the album The Psychomodo by Cockney Rebel, adding Pop to the name in reference to Iggy Pop.

By the mid-1980s, the band has reached the status of an attractive live act, entering the finals of the YU Rock Moment festival, although the members' mandatory stints in the Yugoslav army caused discontinuity in their work. In 1985, the group made their discographic debut, appearing on PGP-RTB various artists compilation Demo Top Vol.3 with the song "Nema nje (Zauvijek)" ("She's Gone (Forever)"). The song featured brass section, Film member Mladen Juričić on guitar, and actresses Mira Furlan, Dubravka Ostojić and Stjepka Kavurić on backing vocals. The long period of breaking through had an effect on the group's lineup, with Banjeglav and Kepenski leaving the band, the latter dedicating himself to his journalistic career. For a short period of time, the band worked on their demo recording with writer and former Buldožer member Davor Slamnig playing the guitar, before they were, in 1985, joined by guitarists Saša Novak Radulović, formerly of Nužni Izlaz (Emergency Exit), and Vlatko Ćavar "Brada", formerly of Ritam s Ovoga Svijeta (Rhythm of This World). The new lineup changed their musical expression, turning to Ramones-influenced punk rock. At the time, Gobac gained significant popularity owing to his role of Milan Blenton in the musical TV show Stereovizija (Stereovision), for which he recorded the song "Grički izotop" ("Grič Isotope").

=== Breakthrough and nationwide popularity, attention of international media (1988–1991) ===
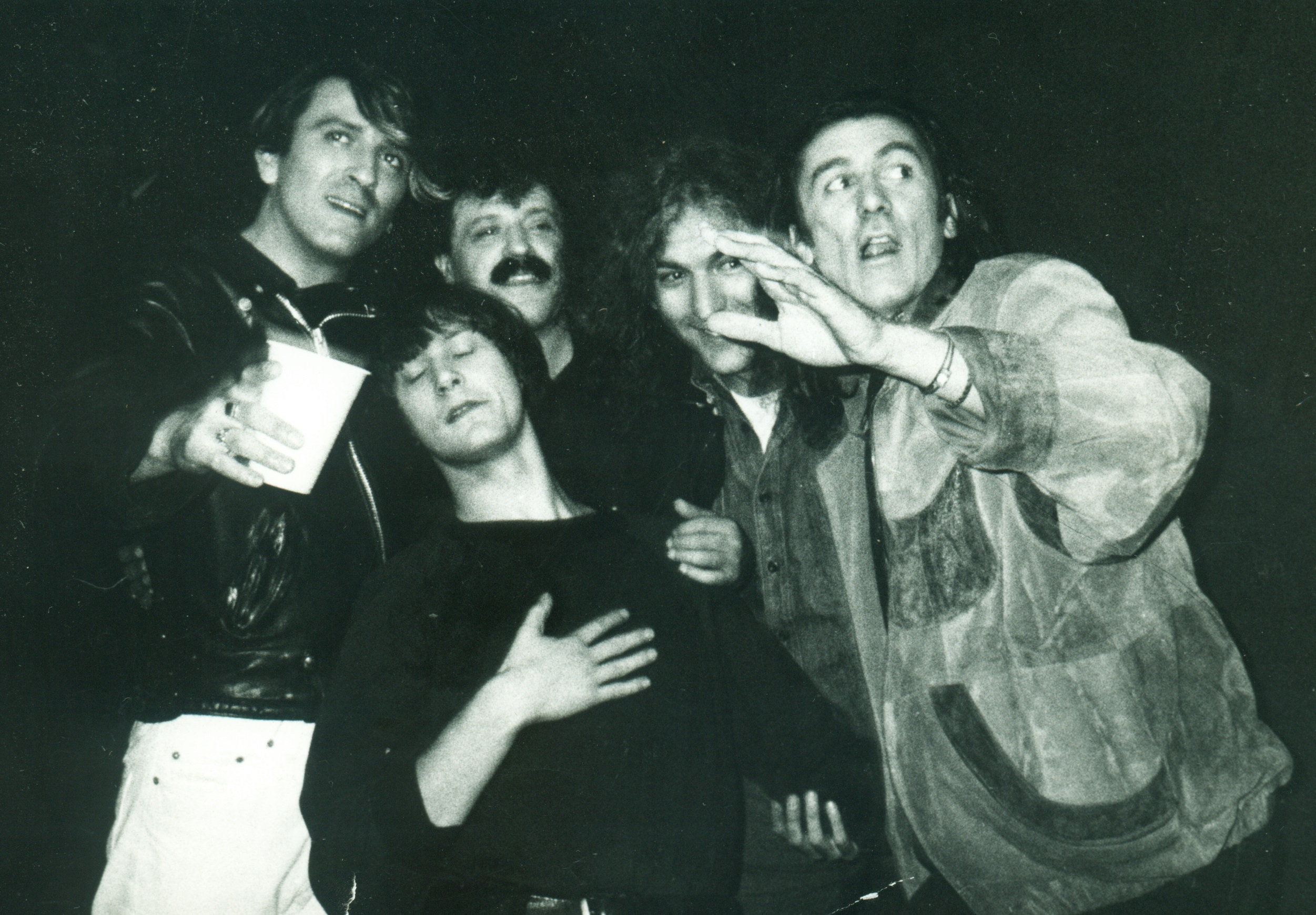
Mladen Vojičić Tifa, Davor Gobac, concert organizer Želimir Altarac "Čičak", Bruno Langer (of Atomsko Sklonište), and Branko Đurić "Đuro" (of Bombaj Štampa) during the 1989 YU Rock Marathon festival held in Sarajevo's Zetra Hall

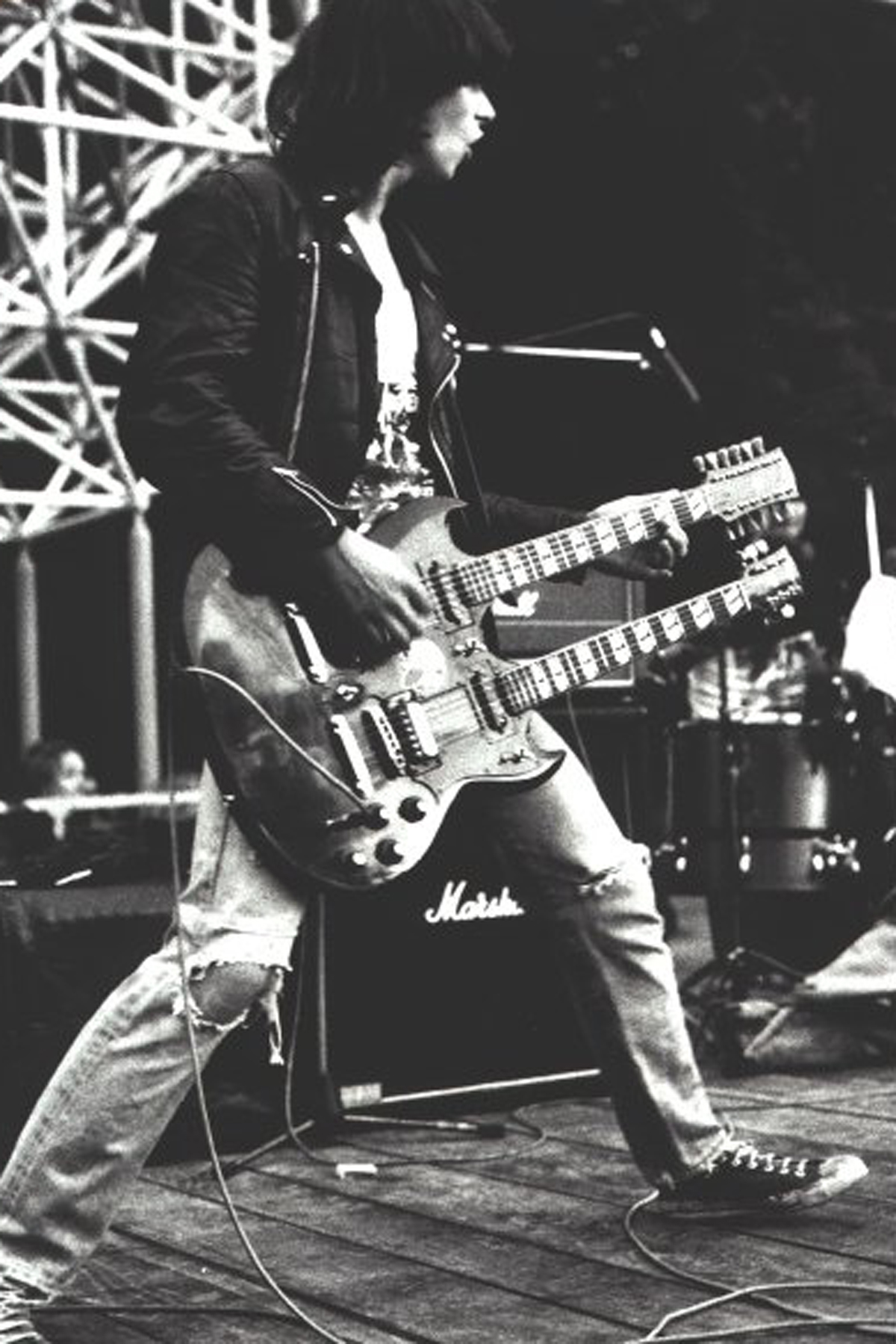
Saša Novak Radulović performing with Psihomodo Pop in 1989

In 1988, Psihomodo Pop released their debut album entitled Godina zmaja (Year of the Dragon). The album was produced by Ivan "Piko" Stančić and brought a number of nationwide hits – "Kad sam imao 16" ("When I Was 16"), "Frida" (written by Slamnig during his short-time stint with the band), "Ja volim samo sebe" ("I Love Only Myself") and the new version of "Nema nje (Zauvijek)". The album also featured a cover of Ramones songs "Ramona" and "I Wanna Be Your Boyfriend", the latter entitled "Hej djevojko" ("Hey Girl"), a cover of Velvet Underground song "Sunday Morning", entitled "Rano jutro" ("Early Morning"), and a cover of T. Rex song "Telegram Sam".

The long-awaited popularity gave them an opportunity to perform on a concert of most popular Zagreb-based bands at the time alongside Parni Valjak, Prljavo Kazalište and Film, the recording of their performances being released on the double live album ZG Rock Forces in 1989. The band held a series of concerts across Yugoslavia, on which Gobac often appeared dressed in female clothes. After concerts in Yugoslavia, the group—although already a popular act in their home country—participated in a battle of the bands in Netherlands, entitled The Great Prize of the Netherlands, followed by their performances in clubs across the country. Their performances attracted the attention of MTV, which made a report about the group. The recordings from their shows in Dutch clubs Paradiso, held on 30 November 1988, and Melkweg, held on 5 February 1989, were released in Yugoslavia on the live album Live in Amsterdam. On both concerts the band was announced by MTV host Marcel Vanthilt. The album featured previously unreleased song "Polako polako" ("Slowly, Slowly"), a cover of The Stooges song ""No Fun", and the English language version of "Ja volim samo sebe" entitled "I'm in Love with Gorbac", in reference to both Davor Gobac and Mikhail Gorbachev. At the beginning of 1990, the band spent two and a half months performing in the Soviet Union, holding 60 joint concerts with Soviet electropop band Electroclub.

Upon their return to Yugoslavia, the band recorded and released their second studio album Sexy magazin (Sexy Magazine). The album was, as the band's debut, produced by Piko Stančić. Stančić also played drums on some of the album tracks and was credited as Sime Kopola on the album cover. Sexy magazin featured the studio version of "Polako polako" and the song "Bomba" ("Bomb"), the latter featuring samples from songs by Ramones, The Pretenders, Led Zeppelin and other acts. For the album cover, Gobac posed in female lingerie. The album brought the hits "Sexy magazin", "Sve je propalo" ("Everything Failed") and "Ona odlazi" ("She's Leaving"). Following the album release, the band members made a guest appearance on the album Ja mnogo bolje letim sam (I Fly Much Better by Myself) by Sarajevo-based band Bombaj Štampa, in the song "Šarene ulice" ("Colorful Streets"), co-written by Gobac and Bombaj Štampa frontman Branko Đurić. In November 1990, Psihomodo Pop performed as the opening act on Ramones concerts in Ljubljana and Zagreb. During the same year, the band released the VHS Briljant video-pop (Brilliant Video Pop), featuring their music videos and concert recordings.

=== Career in independent Croatia (1991–present) ===
At the beginning of 1991, the band recorded the album Tko je ubio Mickey Mousea? (Who Killed Mickey Mouse?), featuring unusual combination of punk rock and children's music. However, due to the outbreak of Yugoslav Wars, the album remained unreleased until 1992. Upon album release, the songs "Volim crtane filmove" ("I Love Cartoons"), "Da nam živi rad" ("Long Live Work") and "Wunderkind" became minor hits. During the Croatian War of Independence, for the 1992 album of patriotic songs Rock za Hrvatsku (Rock for Croatia), the band recorded the song "Hrvatska mora pobjediti" ("Croatia Must Win"), musically inspired by Sex Pistols' "God Save the Queen", and "Pobjeda" ("Victory"). Both songs also appeared on the band's maxi single dedicated to Croatian Home Guard, alongside songs "Victory" and "Croatia & Freedom". A part of former Yugoslav public, especially in Serbia, perceived the band's patriotic tunes as nationalistic, and contrasted the band's support for Croatian war efforts to anti-war rock songs of the time, recorded by acts like KUD Idijoti and Rimtutituki. Simultaneously with recording "Hrvatska mora pobjediti" and "Pobjeda" with the band, Saša Novak Radulović with Piko Stančić, under the name Novak & Kopola, recorded patriotic songs "Bang – Bang! Vukovar", "Lijepa naša" ("Our Beatufil (Homeland)") and "Hrvatine" ("Die-Hard Croats"), also released on Rock za Hrvatsku.

In 1993, the band released the album Srebrne svinje (Silver Pigs). The album, marked by the band's experimentation with Pink Floyd-influenced psychedelic rock, brought successful song "Osjećam se haj, mozak baj baj" ("I Feel High, Brain, Bye Bye") and "Ako umrem mlad" ("If I Die Young"). The album also featured a cover of the Rolling Stones song "Starfucker". The title track featured Dubravko Merlić, host of the popular TV show Slikom na sliku (Picture on Picture), reading the introductory text. At the time of album recording, Šparka and Ćavar simultaneously worked with the band Matchless Gift. At the end of 1993, the band went on a short tour across France. In mid-1994, Croatian magazine Globus published the band members' nude photos, which were originally shot for the Yugoslav sex magazine Erotika as a part of Sexy magazin promotion, but remained unpublished. Psihomodo Pop sued Globus, asking for 50,000 DM compensation. The band won the court case, but never received any money from the magazine.

In 1994, the band released acoustic versions of their old songs for the album Unpljugd (a word play based on the word unplugged and Croatian slang word pljuga, meaning cigarette). The album also included the band's versions of the Hill country blues song "You Gotta Move" and Velvet Underground's "I'm Waiting for the Man". At the time of the album release, Saša Novak Radulović left the band, moving to Germany—where he would cooperate with electronic musician and composer Hans-Joachim Roedelius—and the group was joined by saxophonist and keyboardist Jurij "Kuzma" Novoselić, formerly of Film, Disciplina Kičme and Dee Dee Mellow.

At the end of 1997, the band released the album Sextasy. The album was released with a bonus CD with interviews and other media. The album featured the song "Zagrebačka noć" ("Zagreb Night"), written by Film frontman Jura Stublić in 1979, but previously unrecorded. Despite the album reviews being generally negative, with critics describing the production as aseptic, Sextasy brought the hits "Bože čuvaj Psihomodo Pop" ("God Save Psihomodo Pop") and "Mila". Sextasy was followed by the 1998 live album Das Beste Aus Der Grossen Hit Parade (Die Shonen Melodien '98) (German for The Best of the Big Hit Parade (The Shonen Melodies '98)), recorded on the band's concerts held in ŠTUK club in Maribor, Slovenia on 5 and 6 November 1998. Alongside the energetic live versions of their old songs, the album featured an instrumental cover of Frankie Laine's "El Diablo".

The band recorded their 2000 studio album Debakl (Debacle) with numerous guests – their former collaborator Davor Slamnig, singer Dino Dvornik, drummer Dražen Šolc (of Parni Valjak), guitarist Davor Rodik (of Majke), trumpeter Igor Pavlica (formerly of Haustor), and others. The album was produced by brothers Gordan and Berko Muratović. Alongside band's new songs, the album included a cover of Slamnig's old song "Uspavanka" ("Lullaby"), a cover of Lou Reed's "Hangin' 'Round", entitled "Boby", and a cover of The Beatles song "Hey Bulldog", entitled "Buldog". In March 2001, following the October 2000 overthrow of Slobodan Milošević, the band performed in Serbia for the first time since 1991, holding concerts in Novi Sad, Belgrade and Subotica. In 2003, they celebrated their twentieth anniversary with the release of the compilation album Tekućih 20 (Current 20). Alongside their old songs, the album featured previously unreleased songs and demo recordings. The band also released the DVD entitled Tekućih 20 with career-spanning selection of music videos and TV appearances.

In 2004, the band released the studio album Plastic Fantastic. It featured a cover of The Everly Brothers' "The Price of Love", entitled "Daj mi pusu" ("Give Me a Kiss"), and a cover of Tom Waits' "Cold Water", entitled "Oda radosti" ("Ode to Joy"). Guests on the album included Vodička Glazba orchestra, drummer Tin Ostreš (of Pips, Chips & Videoclips), trumbeter Igor Pavlica and trombonist Nikola Santro (both formerly of Haustor), pianist Davor Lozić, and others. The following studio album by the band, the 2009 Jeee! Jeee! Jeee!, featured, alongside new songs authored by Gobac, new covers – the title track was a cover of The Vibrators song "Yeah Yeah Yeah", and the song "Požar" ("Fire") was a cover of Nancy Sinatra song "About a Fire". The song "Tužni klaun" ("Sad Clown") featured Gracioso string quartet, with string arrangements for the song written by Slamnig. The band celebrated their 26th anniversary with a concert held in Zagreb's Boogaloo club on 28 February 2009. The recordings from the concert were released on the live album Ste dobro? (You OK?), accompanied by a DVD with the video recording of the concert.

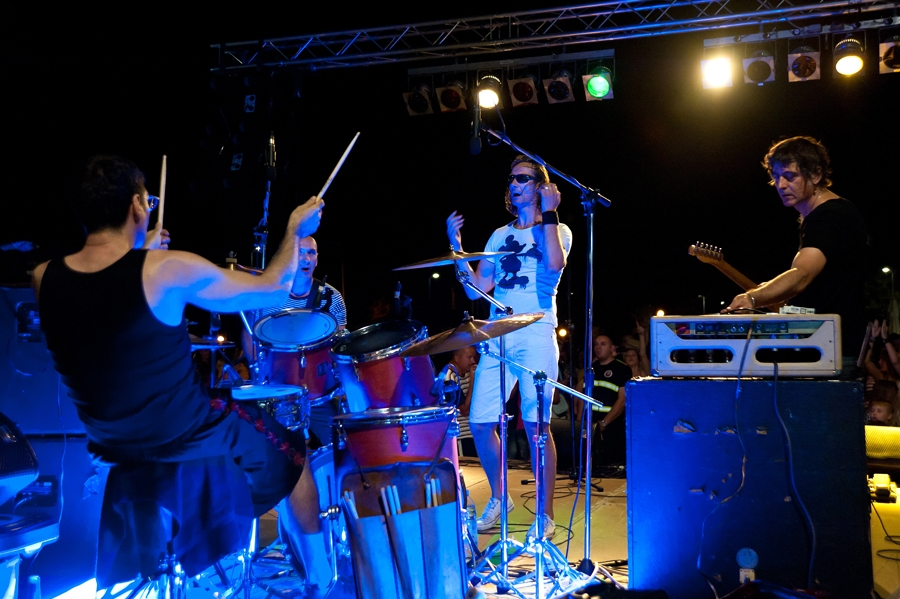
Psihomodo Pop performing in 2013

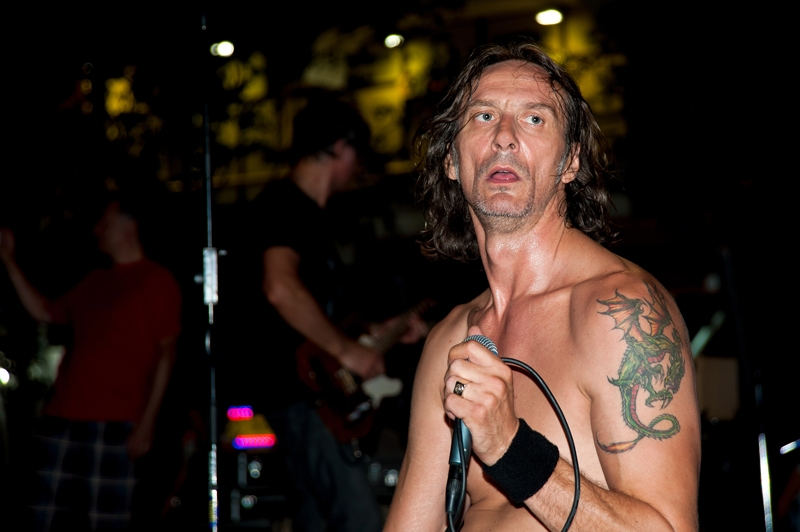
Davor Gobac performing with the band in 2013

The band released their tenth studio album Ćiribu ćiriba (Hocus Pocus) in 2014. The album was produced by Srđan Sekulović "Skansi" and brought several minor hits – "Zločest k'o pas" ("Evil as a Dog"), "Supstance" ("Substances"), a cover of The Beatles song "Rain" entitled "Kiša", and "Donna", the latter written by the band's original guitarist Neven Kepenski when he was 15. The vinyl edition of the album featured "Grički izotop" as a bonus track. On 26 June 2014, Psihomodo Pop, alongside the bands Tempera and Dža ili Bu, performed as an opening act for Billy Idol on the Belgrade Calling festival. In 2015, Croatia Records released the five-piece box set Original Album Collection, featuring reissues of the band's early albums. In 2016, the band recorded a cover of KUD Idijoti song "Nema više snifera" ("There Are No More Sniffers") for KUD Idijoti tribute album Za tebe (For You). In 2017, Psihomodo Pop released the double album Live unpljugd 2 Gavella, featuring CD and DVD with recordings made on their unplugged performances held in Gavella Drama Theatre on 3, 4 and 5 December 2015. The concerts featured brass section, backing vocals group Napalm Djevice (Napalm Virgins) and Mozartine (Mozartinas) choir. After the sudden death of drummer Tigran Kalebota on 11 December 2017, Tin Ostreš, formerly of Pips, Chips & Videoclips, took his place in the band.

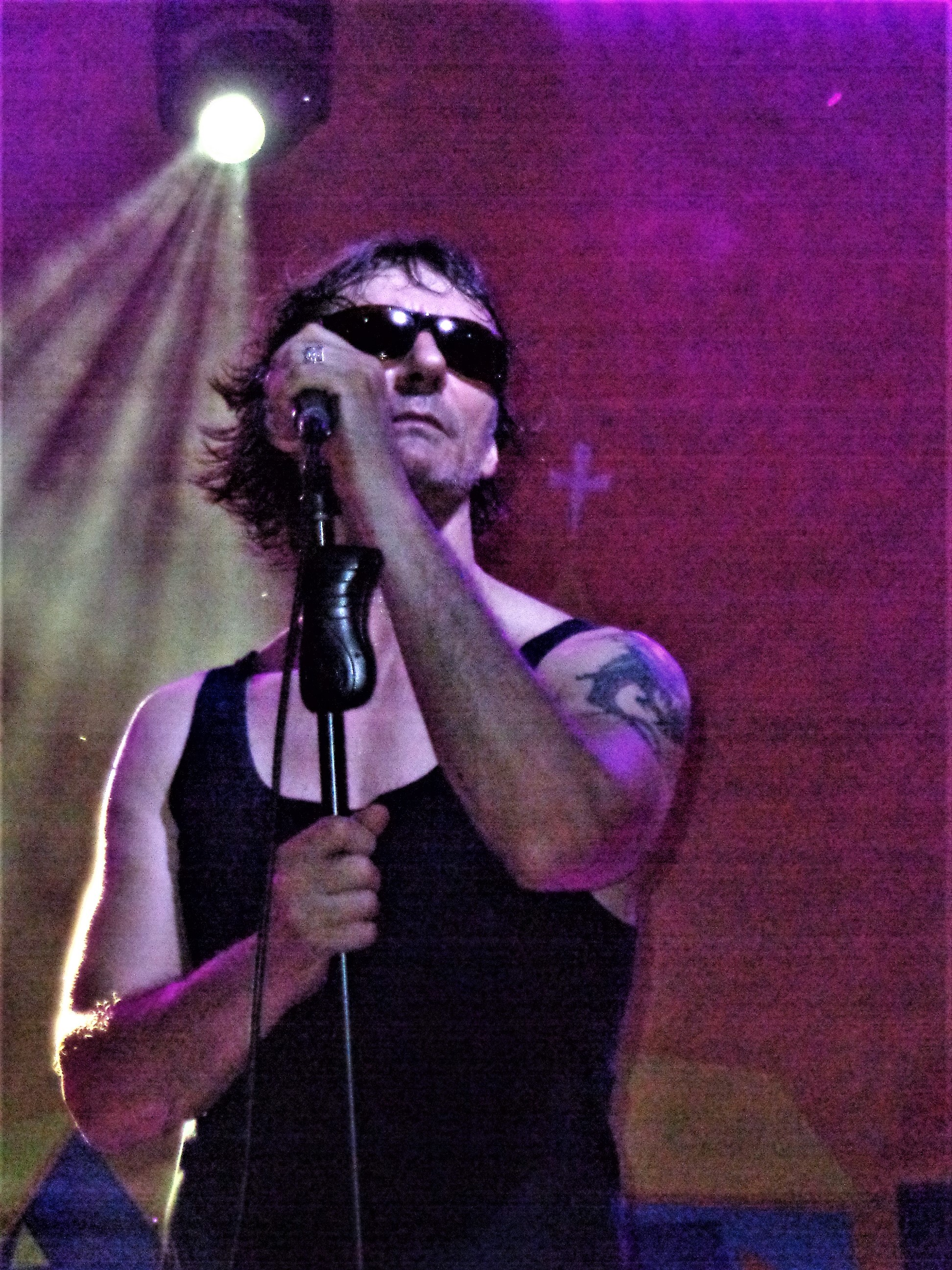
Davor Gobac performing with the band in 2019

In 2019, the band released the studio album, entitled Digitalno nebo (Digital Sky). The album included a cover of the song "Narodna pjesma" ("Folk Song") by Yugoslav punk rock/new wave band Paraf, and brought minor hits "Sve će biti u redu" ("Everything Will Be OK") and "Vampir" ("Vampire"). In 2024, Psihomodo Pop released their latest studio album, entitled Vjerujem u čuda (I Believe in Miracles). Gobac authored most of the album tracks, with the lyrics for two songs written by Smiljko "Smile" Kajtez. The album was produced by Srđan Sekulović. A number of songs featured brass section and soul-influenced sound, with guest appearances by Dean Melki (violin), Darko Sedak-Benčić (trumpet), Miron Hauser (trombone) and Vojkan Jocić (saxophone). Vjerujem u čuda brought the radio hit "Dižeš me" ("You Get Me High").

== Legacy ==
In 2015, Godina zmaja was polled No.69 on the list of 100 Greatest Yugoslav Albums published by the Croatian edition of Rolling Stone.

In 2000, the band's song "Ramona" was polled No.58 on the Rock Express Top 100 Yugoslav Rock Songs of All Times list. In 2006, "Nema nje (Zauvijek)" was polled No.86 on the B92 Top 100 Yugoslav songs list.

== Discography ==
=== Studio albums ===
- Godina zmaja (1988)
- Sexy magazin (1990)
- Tko je ubio Mickey Mousea? (1992)
- Srebrne svinje (1993)
- Unpljugd (1994)
- Sextasy (1997)
- Debakl (2000)
- Plastic Fantastic (2004)
- Jeee! Jeee! Jeee! (2009)
- Ćiribu ćiriba (2014)
- Digitalno nebo (2019)
- Vjerujem u čuda (2024)

=== Live albums ===
- Live in Amsterdam (1989)
- Das Beste Aus Der Grossen Hit Parade (Die Shonen Melodien '98) (1998)
- Ste dobro? (2009)
- Live unpljugd 2 Gavella (2017)

=== Compilations ===
- Tekućih 20 (2003)
- The Ultimate Collection (2007)
- Greatest Hits Collection (2020)

=== Box sets ===
- Original Album Collection (2015)

=== Singles ===
- "Hrvatska mora pobjediti" (maxi single, 1991)

=== Video albums ===
- Briljant video-pop (1990)
- Tekućih 20 (2003)
- Ste dobro? (2009)
- Live unpljugd 2 Gavella (2017)

== See also ==
- Punk rock in Yugoslavia
