= Saša Radulović (disambiguation) =

Saša Radulović (born 1965) is former Minister of Economy of Serbia.

Saša Radulović may also refer to:

- Saša Radulović (footballer, born 1978), Bosnian-Herzegovinian and Australian footballer
- Sasa Radulovic (architect) (born 1972), Canadian architect
- Saša Novak Radulović (born 1964), Croatian guitarist
