= Begnagrad =

Yugoslav band

Background information
- Origin: Ljubljana, SR Slovenia, SFR Yugoslavia
- Genres: Avant-garde rock; progressive rock; jazz rock; folk rock; instrumental rock
- Years active: 1976–1984
- Labels: ZKP RTLJ, Nikad robom, Bess-Pro Market
- Past members: Bratko Bibič; Bogo Pečnikar; Vlado Špindler; Bojan Zidarič; Igor Leonardi; Boris Romih; Nino de Gleria; Aleš Rendla

Begnagrad (the name coming from merging the words Beg na grad, transl. Escape to the Castle) was a Yugoslav avant-garde/progressive rock band formed in Ljubljana in 1976. They were a prominent act of the 1970s and early 1980s Yugoslav rock scene.

Soon after its formation, the band attracted the attention of the Yugoslav public with their unconventional instrumental compositions that combined elements of rock, jazz and traditional music. They released their self-titled debut in 1982, disbanding two years after album release. In the years following the disbandment, former members of the band released two more albums, Jodlovska Urška (1990), featuring the material originally recorded by the band in 1977 and intended to be released as their debut album, and Tastare (Theoldwones) (1992), featuring studio and live recordings from 1976 and 1977.

== History ==
=== 1976–1984 ===
Begnagrad evolved from the band Šest Kilometara Na Uro (Six Kilometres per Hour), active in Ljubljana in the first half of the 1970s. Begnagrad was formed in 1976, the band's lineup featuring Bratko Bibič (accordion), Bogo Pečnikar (clarinet), Vlado Špindler (bass guitar), and Igor Muševič (drums), guitarists Bojan Zidarič, Igor Leonardi and Boris Romih cooperating with them on different occasions. The band performed avant-garde music with the elements of free jazz, swing, traditional music, but also of pop, and soon gained attention of the audience with their unconventional compositions "Kranjska Gora blues nazaj" ("Kranjska Gora Blues Back"), "Jara kača" ("Spring Snake"), "Tanova", "Begnagrad", "Zimska" ("Winter One"), and "Rimish Boro" (the name being an anagram of Boris Romih's name), the latter featuring a musical quotation from traditional Serbian dance "Žikino kolo".

After their performance at the prominent Youth Festival in Subotica in 1977, they recorded part of their songs in Radio Novi Sad studios with producer Anđelko Maletić. The recordings should have appeared on their first album, however that record was never released. During 1977, they performed in Belgrade's Students' Cultural Center on the Days of Slovenian Youth Culture, alongside the bands Buldožer and Pankrti. At that time, they often performed together with singer-songwriter Andrej Trobentar. Their performances featured the elements of cabaret, and during traditional Slovenian holidays they used to perform in Ljubljana kafanas. In 1978, Špindler had to leave the band to serve his mandatory stint in the Yugoslav army, and Begnagrad went on hiatus.

The group reunited at the beginning of the 1980s. During the following years, Begnagrad went to numerous lineup and stylistic changes. They recorded their debut album in the lineup featuring Bibič, Pečnikar, Romih, Nino de Gleria (bass guitar), and Aleš Rendla (drums, violin). The album, entitled simply Begnagrad, was released in 1982 through ZKP RTLJ. The songs on the album were composed by Bibič and Romih. The band spent 1983 and 1984 performing mostly in Western Europe. They ended their activity in 1984.

=== Post breakup ===
After Begnagrad ended their activity, Nino de Gleria, Aleš Rendla and Igor Leonardi, all three graduates from the jazz department of the University of Music and Performing Arts Graz, formed the alternative jazz band Quatebriga with Milko Lazar (soprano saxophone), Dejvid Džar (trumpet), and Matjaž Albreht (saxophone, flute). The group recorded four albums, Revolution in the Zoo (1985), The Choice of the New Generation (1987), Vol. 1 (1995), and Post Mortem Dump (1997).

At the beginning of the 1990s, Leonardi was active on New York City and New Orleans jazz scenes, for a time performing with trumpeter Don Cherry. In 1997, he formed Fake Orchestra, recording the studio albums Fake World (2004) and Made in China (2009), and the live album Fake Life (2002) with the band. The group featured De Gleria, Rendla, Jelena Ždrale (violin), Blaž Ceralec (percussion), Primož Fleischman (saxophone, flute), Ana Vipotnik (vocals), and Janja Majzelj (vocals). Leonardi composed music for film and theatre, releasing part of these compositions on his solo albums Rezervni deli (Spare Parts, 2003) and Sangeeta (2006).

Branko Bibič performed across the world with a number of bands. With the Swiss band Nimal he recorded the albums Voix de Surface (1990), Voix de Surface (1991), and Dis-Tanz (1992). With the backing band The Madleys, featuring Pečnikar, Shirley Hofmann (trombone), and Matjaž Sekne (viola and violin), he recorded the album Of Bridko Bebič (1995), featuring his compositions for accordion. He recorded three more albums with The Madleys, Na domačem vrtu (In the Home Garden, 2002), Live at Aplentone (live album, 2009), and Kabinet čudes Brutka Bimbiča (Brutko Bimbič's Cabinet of Wonders). At the end of the 1990s, he formed the group Accordion Tribe, recording four albums with them: Accordion Tribe (1998), Novitete in staritete (Novelties and Antiques, 2000), Sea of Reeds (2002), and Lunghorn Twist (2006). With a number of collaborators he recorded the album Hommage a Cliche (2019). He wrote music for TV films and contemporary ballet. In 2014, he published the book Harmonika za budalce (Accordion for Idiots), dealing with the history of accordion, Begnagrad and his solo works.

In 1990, Begnagrad album Jodlovska Urška (Yodeling Urška) was released, featuring the material originally recorded in Radio Novi Sad studios in 1977. During the same year, the band's debut album was re-released by the French record label AYYA, under the title Konzert for a Broken Dance, featuring a session recording entitled "Tazadnatanova = Thelastnewone" as a bonus tracks. The album reissue was well received in Western Europe. In 1992, former members of the band released the album Tastare (Theoldwones), featuring the recordings from the 1977 Radio Novi Sad sessions, recordings made in 1976 in Ljubljana's Radio Študent and the ten-minute track "Tazadna tanova", recorded on their 1977 performance in Ljubljana cinema Sloga. In 2003, the band's first album was re-released by the Israeli record label MIO Records, this time under the original title, featuring audio and video recordings from the band's 1983 live performances as bonus.

== Discography ==
=== Studio albums ===
- Begnagrad (1982)
- Jodlovska Urška (1990)

=== Compilation albums ===
- Tastare (Theoldwones) (1992)
