= Jodlovska Urška =

Studio album by Begnagrad
- Released: 1990
- Recorded: Summer of 1977
- Studios: Radio Novi Sad studios, Novi Sad
- Genres: Progressive rock; jazz rock; folk rock; instrumental rock
- Label: Nikad robom
- Producers: Begnagrad, Anđelko Maletić

Begnagrad chronology
Begnagrad (1982)	Jodlovska Urška (1990)	Tastare (Theoldwones) (1992)

Jodlovska Urška (transl. Yodeling Urška) is the second studio album by the Yugoslav avant-garde/progressive rock Begnagrad released in 1990. At the time of Jodlovska Urška release, the band has been inactive for six years. The material released on the album was recorded in 1977 and originally intended to be released on the band's debut studio album.

== Background ==
Begnagrad was formed in 1976 by Bratko Bibič (accordion), Bogo Pečnikar (clarinet), Vlado Špindler (bass guitar), and Igor Muševič (drums), guitarists Bojan Zidarić, Igor Leonardi and Boris Romih cooperating with them on different occasions. The band performed avant-garde rock with the elements of free jazz, swing, traditional music, but also of pop, and soon gained attention of the audience with their unconventional compositions. After their performance at the prominent Youth Festival in Subotica in 1977, they recorded part of their songs in Radio Novi Sad studios with producer Anđelko Maletić. The recordings should have appeared on their first album, however that record was never released, and the material was kept by Maletić in his personal archive. The group released their first official album, Begnagrad, in 1982, spending the following two years performing mostly in Western Europe and disbanding in 1984. In 1990, former members of the band released the material from the 1977 sessions as the band's second studio album.

== Track listing ==
All songs written by Begnagrad.

Side A
No.	Title	Length
1.	"Jara kaća" ("Spring Snake")	9:43
2.	"Beg na grad" ("Escape to the Castle")	1:43
3.	"Boris Ris Romih Mih"	1:23
4.	"Ta nova" ("This New One")	2:55
5.	"Uspavanka za Juvana" ("Lullaby for Juvan")	7:55
6.	"Beg na grad" ("Escape to the Castle")	4:10

Side B
No.	Title	Length
1.	"Kranjska Gora Blues"	2:24
2.	"Taleva-Panzer Valtz" ("Melting-Panzer Waltz")	2:37
3.	""Zimska"" ("The Winter Song")	3:04
4.	"Tolmun" ("The Pool")	4:11
5.	"Ta dolga" ("This Long One")	10:35

== Personnel ==
- Bratko Bibič - accordion, melodica
- Bogo Pečnikar - clarinet
- Boris Romih - guitar, recorded by
- Vlatko Špindler - bass guitar
- Igor Muševič - drums

=== Additional personnel ===
- Anđelko Maletić - producer
- Predrag Konjikušić - photography
