= Tulsa Time =

Single by Don Williams

from the album Expressions
- B-side: "When I'm with You"
- Released: October 1978
- Genre: Country
- Length: 3:10
- Label: ABC
- Songwriter: Danny Flowers
- Producers: Don Williams, Garth Fundis

Don Williams singles chronology
"Rake and Ramblin' Man" (1978)	"Tulsa Time" (1978)	"Lay Down Beside Me" (1979)

"Tulsa Time" is a song written by Danny Flowers and recorded by American country music artist Don Williams. It was released in October 1978 as the first single from the album Expressions. It was Williams' eighth number one on the country chart, spending a single week at number one and eleven weeks in the top 40. It was also recorded by Eric Clapton for his 1978 album Backless and a live version by Clapton from his album Just One Night became a #30 Billboard hit in 1980.

== Background and recording ==
In September 1978, Flowers and the Don Williams band members were staying at a Sheraton Hotel in Tulsa, Oklahoma. A snowstorm had caused an interruption of their schedule. Flowers said, "We were all snowed in, and there was absolutely nothing to do. I was sitting there in my room, watching The Rockford Files with some hotel stationery beside me, just bored, and I started writing out some verses." He spent only a half-hour on it and the song had only two chords. Flowers said he intended to add another chord later, "but Don heard it and liked it the way it was."

About two months later, Flowers was performing with Williams in Nashville as the opening act for an Eric Clapton concert. After the performance, Flowers and Williams went to Clapton's hotel room where the three men took turns playing songs. Flowers sang and played guitar on his new song, "Tulsa Time" with Williams singing harmony and Clapton playing slide guitar on a dobro. Clapton said, "I love that song and I want to record it right away". Williams said, "You can't record it— I'm going to record it". Both artists recorded the song, but Williams was first.

Williams' recording of "Tulsa Time" was the first song on his album Expressions, released in August 1978. By October, the song was number one on the Country singles chart. It became the number one Billboard country song of 1979. The song was named "single record of the year" in 1979 by the Academy of Country Music and Williams won CMA Male Vocalist of the Year.

=== Eric Clapton versions ===
Clapton initially released two versions of the song: first on his 1978 album Backless and second in 1980 on the live album Just One Night. The latter version was released as a single and reached number 30 on the U.S. Billboard Hot 100 singles chart. A live version from 1978 appears on Clapton's Crossroads 2: Live in the Seventies, a boxed set released in 1996. This is a different performance from the version featured on Just One Night.

== Critical reception ==
In 2024, Rolling Stone ranked the song at #132 on its 200 Greatest Country Songs of All Time ranking.

== Charts ==
=== Don Williams version ===
==== Weekly charts ====
Chart (1978–1979)	Peak position
US Hot Country Songs (Billboard)	1
US Bubbling Under Hot 100 (Billboard)	106
Canadian RPM Country Tracks	1

==== Year-end charts ====
Chart (1979)	Position
US Hot Country Songs (Billboard)	25

=== Eric Clapton version ===
Note: (Note: The Clapton version is a live version from his album Just One Night b/w a live version of "Cocaine" from the same album; both songs were credited to Eric Clapton and his Band on the single.)

==== Weekly charts ====
Chart (1980)	Position
US Billboard Hot 100	30

== See also ==
- Don Mentony Band, a Slovenian band who recorded a remake of "Tulsa Time"
