= Na Lepem Prijazni =

- Origin: Ljubljana, Slovenia
- Genres: Jazz rock; progressive rock; avant-garde rock; funk rock
- Years active: 1978–1981; 2005–present
- Labels: Helidon, Nika
- Members: Vojko Aleksić; Ludvik Bagari; Boštjan Franetič; Damir Vintar; Luka Kuhar; Žiga Fabbro
- Past members: Andrej Trobentar; Polde Poljanšek; Tomaž Sržen; Roman Škraba; Andrija Pušić; Al Stone; Matjaž Ugovšek; Kate Hosking; Stojan Kralj; Borut Praper; Jan Jarni; Darko Hočevar

Na Lepem Prijazni (transl. Suddenly Polite (Ones)) is a Slovenian and Yugoslav jazz rock band formed in Ljubljana in 1978.

Formed in the wake of Yugoslav punk and Yugoslav new wave scenes, Na Lepem Prijazni were one of the last bands of the Yugoslav progressive rock scene to gain the attention of the audience and the media with their avant-garde approach to music. The band released their debut self-titled album in 1981, ending their activity soon after its release. In 2005, the band's vocalist Andrej Trobentar and guitarist Vojko Aleksić reformed Na Lepem Prijazni. The group has released four studio albums since, Aleksić remaining the only mainstay member of the band.

== History ==
=== 1978–1981 ===
Na Lepem Prijazni were formed in 1978 by Vojko Aleksić (guitar), Polde Poljanšek (saxophone), Tomaž Sržen (bass guitar) and Roman Škraba (drums). Initially, the band performed instrumentals composed by Aleksić. They were soon joined by vocalist Andrej Trobentar, who had already gained the attention of the public as a singer-songwriter. Trobentar was previously, during 1974, vocalist for the band Sedem Svetlobnih Let (Seven Light Years). After Sedem Svetlobnih Let was joined by vocalist Marko Brecelj, Trobentar left the band and formed the group Šest Kilometara Na Uro (Six Kilometres per Hour), which would, for a period of time, also feature Aleksić, and would after Trobentar's departure evolve into Begnagrad. With the arrival of Trobentar, Na Lepem Prijazni started writing songs featuring Trobentar's lyrics.

Soon after, Poljanšek left the group, and the band was joined by keyboardist Andrija Pušić (older brother of musician Antonije Pušić, better known by his stage name Rambo Amadeus), and Sržek was replaced by Al Stone. Pušić had moved to Ljubljana from Herceg Novi, where he performed in hotel bands, and Stone was a British who came to Yugoslavia in 1978, and had spent some time performing with the bands Pepel in Kri and Jutro. The new lineup of Lepem Prijazni gained the attention of the public, and was invited to perform on the twentieth edition of the Youth Festival in Subotica, alongside new wave bands Šarlo Akrobata, Idoli, Električni Orgazam, Film, Haustor and Kontraritam. On the festival, the jury awarded them the third place for their song "Masaž" ("Massage").

The group released their debut self-titled album in 1981 through Helidon record label. The album was produced by Braco Dolbekar, who also played saxophone and congas on the album recording. The album brought the band's vision of jazz rock, with influences from pop and reggae. Due to the track "Suckitandsee" written by Stone, the album was marked as kitsch by SR Slovenia censorship commission. Soon after the album was released, Aleksić went to serve his mandatory stint in the Yugoslav army, and the group ended their activity.

=== Post breakup ===
After the dissolution of Na Lepem Prijazni, Pušić played guitar in the punk rock band Otroci Socializma, and in the second half of the 1980s he performed with the synth-pop band Videosex playing the keyboards. He cooperated with his brother Rambo Amadeus under the pseudonym Digital Mandrak. Stone worked as a studio musician in the Akademik studio in Ljubljana. After his departure from Na Lepem Prijazni, Poljanšek formed the pop band Agropop. Upon his return from the army, Aleksić formed the band Gax Max, releasing two albums with them, Mi jih beremo ko jih pobiramo (We Read Them When We Collect Them, 1986) and Then Are (1990). At the time of the band formation, both Aleksić and Trobentar were art students, and in following years both made successful careers in painting and illustration. Aleksić recorded and self-released two solo albums to accompany his art exhibits, Bizart (1998) and Na levo prijazni (Polite on the Left, 2001).

In 1994, the Nika record label released the compilation album What a Time to Make a Fool of You, which featured all the tracks from the band's debut album, the songs from the band's 1980 7-inch single and the alternate version of the song "Lisica" ("The Fox").

=== 2005–present ===
In 2005, Trobentar, Aleksić and Škraba reunited for two concerts. The performances featured, beside Trobentar on vocals, Aleksić on guitar and Škraba on drums, Matjaž Ugovšek on guitar and Australian musician Kate Hosking on bass guitar. In 2005, the band, under a slightly altered name, Na Lepem Prijazni Mutant, released their comeback album, Potaplja se raj / Paradise Drowning. The album recording featured, alongside original members Trobetnar and Aleksić, Stojan Kralj (bass guitar) and Borut Praper (drums), as well as David Jarh (trumpet), Tinkara Kovač (vocals, flute) and Oto Pestner (vocals). Alongside new songs, the album featured new versions of the band's old songs "Lisica" and "Faeton" ("Phaethon").

In 2012, the band released the album Tudi če se vrnemo nazaj (Even If We Go Back), this time under the name Na Lepem Prijazni. The album fearued, beside Trobentar and Aleksić, Jan Jarni on guitar, David Jahr on trumpet, Darko Hočevar (formerly of Otroci Socializma) on bass guitar and Luka Kuhar on drums. Trobentar recorded the vocals for only two tracks, while the rest of the vocals were recorded by Kate Hosking and actor Ludvik Bagari. After the release of the album, Trobentar left Na Lepem Prijazni, releasing his first solo album, Dar (The Gift), in 2014.

In 2017, the group released the album Srceder (Heartbreaker), featuring the new lineup, with Aleksić as the only remaining original member, alongside Ludvik Bagari (vocals), Boštjan Franetič (guitar), Darko Hočevar (bass guitar), Luka Kuhar (drums) and Žiga Fabbro (keyboards, saxophone). In 2023, the band released the album Uživaj (Enjoy). Unlike the songs on Srceder, which were composed by different members of the band and featured lyrics written by Bagari, all the songs on Uživaj were authored by Aleksić.

== Discography ==
=== Studio albums ===
- Na Lepem Prijazni (1981)
- Potaplja se raj / Paradise Drowning (2005)
- Tudi če se vrnemo nazaj (2012)
- Srceder (2017)
- Uživaj (2023)

=== Compilation albums ===
- What a Time to Make a Fool of You (1994)

=== Singles ===
- "Faeton" / "Črna ovca" (1980)
