= Buldožer =

Slovenian and Yugoslav rock band

- The 1979–1981 Buldožer lineup, from left to right: Boris Bele, Andrej Veble, Borut Činč, Dušan Vran and Davor Slamnig

Background information
- Origin: Ljubljana, SR Slovenia, SFR Yugoslavia
- Genres: Avant-garde rock; progressive rock; comedy rock; new wave; rock and roll; alternative rock
- Years active: 1975–1983; 1991–1999; 2006
- Labels: ZKP RTLJ; PGP RTB; Helidon; Racman; Croatia Records
- Past members: Boris Bele; Marko Brecelj; Borut Činč; Andrej Veble; Uroš Lovšin; Štefan Jež; Vili Bertok; Tone Dimnik; Janez Zmazek; Dušan Žiberna; Dušan Vran; Davor Slamnig; Lado Jakša; Ven Jemeršič

Buldožer (Transl. Bulldozer) was a Slovenian and Yugoslav rock band formed in 1975 in Ljubljana. One of the first avant-garde acts on the Yugoslav rock scene, Buldožer were noted for their experimentation with a variety of genres, musical parodies, humorous and satirical lyrics and provocative and self-ironic imagery and public performances. They are often described as the forefathers of the Yugoslav new wave scene and are generally considered one of the most prominent and influential acts of the Yugoslav rock scene in general.

The first lineup of Buldožer featured guitarist and vocalist Boris Bele, vocalist Marko Brecelj (who had already gained attention of the public as singer-songwriter), keyboardist Borut Činč, bass guitarist Andrej Veble, guitarist Uroš Lovšin and drummer Štefan Jež. The group's debut album Pljuni istini u oči, released in 1975, was a commercial and critical success. Appearing on the progressive- and jazz rock-dominated Yugoslav scene, Pljuni istini u oči attracted the attention of the Yugoslav public and music press with band's unusual sound, madcap humor and subtle provocation. Following the band's second studio album, Zabranjeno plakatirati, featuring similar dark humor and sarcastic lyrics as the band's debut, Brecelj left the band, dedicating himself to his solo career. The group was joined by guitarist and writer Davor Slamnig, Bele taking over the role of the group's lead vocalist. During the following years Bele and Činč would be the band's main creative force. After mini soundtrack album Živi bili pa vidjeli (recorded with Brecelj, but released after his departure), Buldožer released the 1980 album Izlog jeftinih slatkiša, keeping up with their earlier humorous and satirical lyrics, but moving towards simpler sound and joining in on the vibrant Yugoslav new wave scene. After a rock and roll revival mini album and a live album, both well received by the public and music critics, the band recorded their last 1980s release, the 1983 album Nevino srce, which was followed by a long hiatus. The group reunited at the beginning of 1990s, releasing their comeback album Noć in 1995. They disbanded at the end of the decade, making another reunion in 2006, for a series of concerts in former Yugoslav region.

== History ==
=== The beginnings (early 1970s–1975) ===
The band's beginnings can be tracked back to early 1970s and the progressive rock band Sedem Svetlobnih Let (Seven Light Years), formed by guitarist and vocalist Boris Bele, keyboardist Borut Činč, bass guitarist Andrej Veble (formerly of the band Homemakers), guitarist Dušan Žiberna (who would later become a member of Pankrti), drummer Jani Tutta and vocalist Andrej Trobentar (who would later become the leader of Na Lepem Prijazni). Despite not having frequent live performances, the band held intensive rehearsals, working on their songs which were similar in style to later works of Buldožer. They gained attention of the Yugoslav public with their appearance at the 1974 edition of the BOOM Festival, their song "Krinko raskrinkaj" ("Unmask the Mask") appearing on the various artists live album Boom Pop Festival Ljubljana '74 recorded at the event.

Soon, the band started to collaborate with singer-songwriter Marko Brecelj, but without larger ambitions. Brecelj, a former member of the band Krik (Scream), had already released a solo album, entitled Cocktail, in 1974, which brought an unusual combination of avant-garde and schlager music, with Brecelj's compositions arranged by composer Bojan Adamič and performed by RTV Ljubljana Dance Orchestra. Sedem Svedlobnih Let members had made a guest appearance on the album, playing on the song "Hiškar Rogač". Following the album release, Brecelj had a song of his accepted for competition at the 1975 Opatija Festival. However, after he started working with Sedem Svetlobnih Let, he realized his appearance at a pop music festival would be pointless, so he suggested to Bele to appear with him on the festival only to provoke the public. The two made several scandals at the festival and, as result, did not enter the festival's finals.

=== Band formation, debut album and rise to prominence (1975–1976) ===
In March 1975, Brecelj, Bele, Činč and Veble were joined by guitarist Uroš Lovšin and drummer Štefan Jež, the six starting to perform under the name Buldožer. They chose the name on the suggestion of Bele, who got inspiration from a work by poet and long-time friend of the band Ivan "Feo" Volarič. The band had their first notable performance at the 1975 edition of BOOM Festival, held in Zagreb on 31 May. On the event they were spotted and offered a contract by the executives of the country's biggest record label, Zagreb-based Jugoton. However, the band opted to sign a contract with Jugoton's main competitor, Belgrade-based PGP-RTB, believing their humor would be met with good reception in the Yugoslav republic of Serbia.

The band started to record their debut album in August 1975 in Ljubljana's Akademik studio. The record was produced by the band members themselves with the help of music journalist Dražen Vrdoljak. The album, entitled Pljuni istini u oči (Spit into the Eyes of Truth), was released in December the same year. Opening with a sketch about a man looking for a convenient place to commit a suicide, the album brought a number of unusual songs, like "Yes My Baby No", "Ljubav na prvi krevet" ("Love at First Bed"), "Blues gnjus" and "Život, to je feferon" ("Life Is a Chili Pepper"), with references to and parodies of songs by Yugoslav pop singers. The magazine-like album cover, inspired by the cover of Jethro Tull's Thick as a Brick, featured the band's madcap texts and increased the public's interest for the band. The initial number of copies was soon sold out. However, despite large interest of the public, PGP-RTB delayed reissuing the album, as some songs and certain details of the cover were perceived as overly provocative; the most provocative aspect of the album was piece of the album cover which featured a combination of cynical text with a childhood photograph of Činč, in which he, dressed in Yugoslav pioneer uniform, plays the accordion under a photograph of Yugoslav president for life Josip Broz Tito. The country's most notable music magazine Džuboks published a review of Pljuni istini u oči by writer Momo Kapor, who praised the album, concluding: "Don't blame the mirror if you're ugly!"

Despite large interest of the public and positive reactions coming from the music press, most of the country's media ignored the band. During 1976, they gradually gained media attention with frequent live performances. Initially, the band was better accepted in Yugoslav republics of Serbia and Croatia then in their home republic of Slovenia, where they often faced cancellations of their concerts. Brecelj gained the attention of the public with his on-stage eccentricities, like unusual monologues, acrobatics, going out on stage in a wheelchair, and setting his hair and beard on fire. The Yugoslav music press compared the band's performances to the freak scene and the works of Frank Zappa, but the band dissented from the comparison, describing themselves as "a typical folk-pop ensemble from Slovenia" and "eine tipische export artikel aus Slowenien" (German for "a typical export article from Slovenia"). The band released a humorous press kit, including photographs entitled "Mama z dojenčkom" ("Mother with a Baby"), featuring Bele breastfeeding Brecelj, and "Pas je čovekov najbolji prijatelj" ("Dog is a Man's Best Friend"), featuring Bele walking Brecelj on a leash. The band's promotional posters featured a photograph originally entitled "Novo dupe naše grupe" ("Our Group's New Ass"), featuring a posterior with a cigarette between the cheeks among the faces of band members.

New attention of the media led to large interest of the Slovenian public, and in June 1976 Buldožer held a sold-out concert in Ljubljana's Tivoli Hall, becoming the first Slovenian band to sell out the venue. The concert was entitled Povratak otkazanih (The Return of the Cancelled) in reference to cancellations of their previous concerts. During the year, Brecelj received the Seven Secretaries of SKOJ Award, given to young artists for their achievements in various fields of culture, for his album Cocktail, thus becoming the first Yugoslav rock artist to receive the prestigious award.

=== Second album recording and release, Brecelj's departure (1976–1979) ===
The band recorded their second album in a new lineup, featuring Brecelj, Bele, Lovšin, Činč and two new members, Vili Bertok (bass guitar) and Tone Dimnik (drums). Upon the album completion, the band entered long and tiresome negotiations with PGP-RTB. The band's original intention was to name the album Još jedna ploča što kvari decu (Another Record That Spoils the Children), which the label refused, and the band eventually opted for the title Zabranjeno plakatirati (Postering Forbidden). The label's editors claimed that some of the lyrics are "pornographic", also suggesting to the band to change the word "nirvana" to "kafana" in the verse "Za dan-dva i odoh ja u nirvanu" ("In a day or two, I'm off to nirvana"). Without the band's knowledge, the line "Ličnu kartu, molim" ("Your ID, Please"), alluding to identification conducted by Yugoslav police officers, was omitted from the song "Jeste li vidjeli djevojčice" ("Have You Seen Little Girl"). PGP-RTB delayed album publication for a year, and the recordings were eventually bought off by the independent Slovenian label Helidon. The album was finally released in October 1977. It brought a series of songs with lyrics filled with dark humor and sarcasm, most prominently "Helga", "Doktore pomozite" ("Help Me, Doctor") and "Dobro jutro, madam Jovanović" ("Good Morning, Madame Jovanović").

After the album release, Bele was drafted to serve his mandatory stint in the Yugoslav army. Brecelj continued to lead Buldožer, featuring two new guitarists, Janez Zmazek and Dušan Žiberna, and the new drummer Dušan Vran. Soon, Brecelj was also drafted. However, the band managed to get together to perform as the opening act for Dr. Feelgood on their concerts in Ljubljana, Rijeka and Belgrade.

At the end of 1978, with Bele back from the army, Buldožer wrote the music for the film That's the Way the Cookie Crumbles, directed by Bruno Gamulin and Milivoj Puhlovski, also appearing in the film performing the song "Novo vrijeme" ("New Times") in Zagreb club Lapidarij. By then, the band had already wrote material and envisioned the concept of their following album. However, in March 1979, Brecelj departed from the band to work on his solo career, later stating he left Buldožer as they "didn't get along in bed anymore".

=== Bele as frontman and change of sound (1979–1984) ===
In June 1979, Buldožer was joined by Davor Slamnig, a writer and guitarist from Zagreb, formerly of the band Entropija (Entropy), Bele taking over the role of the band's lead vocalist. The band's following release was the mini album with music from That's the Way the Cookie Crumbles, entitled Živi bili pa vidjeli (Live to See, which was also the film's original title). At the 1979 Pula Film Festival, the band was awarded the prestigious Golden Arena for Best Film Music. The members of the band were informed of the award from a newspaper article. In interviews following the success they claimed that they "modestly bribed the jury" in order to beat Bijelo Dugme, the most popular Yugoslav rock band at the time, which was also nominated for the award, for their music from Aleksandar Mandić's film Personal Affairs. Due to his mandatory stint in the Yugoslav army, Bertok left Buldožer, and the band's original bass guitarist Andrej Veble, who was at the time working as a physician in Ljubljana hospital, was approached to rejoin the group, which he accepted.

At the beginning of 1980, the band recorded their third album Izlog jeftinih slatkiša (Shop Window of Cheap Candy) in Tivoli studio in Ljubljana. The album was produced by Bele and Činč and featured lyrics written by Brecelj prior to his departure from the group. The album recording featured guest appearances by Metka Močnik on vocals, Lado Jakša on saxophone and Srečo Papič on sitar. Izlog jeftinih slatkiša was released through Helidon and brought simpler, three-minute tracks, influenced by the country's new and exuberant new wave scene. Featuring diverse genre influences, the album brought Buldožer's first radio hit, "Žene i muškarci" ("Women and Men"), which was released on a 7-inch single with vintage pornographic drawings on the cover. Other well-received songs included "Okrutni bogovi istoka" ("Cruel Gods of the East"), "Slovinjak punk" ("Slovenian Punk"), which was the band's first song in Slovenian language (prior to it all their lyrics were in Serbo-Croatian), and "Boogie za prijatelja" ("Boogie for a Friend"), the latter featuring lyrics written by Ivan Volarič. During the year, Slamnig received the Seven Secretaries of SKOJ Award, for his book of short stories Čudovište (Monster), becoming the second member of the group to receive it.

Following the album release, in September 1980, Činč, who had during that year also collaborated with punk rock band Pankrti on their debut album Dolgcajt (Boredom), temporarily left the group to serve his mandatory army stint. On the Izlog jeftinih slatkiša promotional tour he was replaced by Lado Jakša, who had already gained prominence as jazz saxophonist and keyboardist. The tour performances featured appearances by photo model Tatjana Hartman "Beba", who appeared on stage during the performance of "Žene i muškarci" wearing provocative clothing and performed striptease during encores. At the time of the tour, Bele became an editor in Helidon, and the record label bought off the rights to Buldožer's first album from PGP-RTB, reissuing it in 1981, replacing the childhood photo of Činč in pioneer uniform under the image of president Tito (which sparked controversy upon album's release in 1975) with a photograph of a nude man. The album reissue achieved large commercial success.

In 1981, Slamnig left Buldožer, and the group was rejoined by guitarist Janez Zmazek. In October 1981, the new lineup recorded the mini album Rok end roul (transliteration of Rock and Roll). It featured a cover of rock and roll standard "Blue Suede Shoes", as well as the band's own, stylistically similar songs. In trend with the rock and roll revival brought to the Yugoslav scene by young new wave acts, the album was well received by the public.

The band's first live release, the double album Ako ste slobodni večeras (If You're Free Tonight), was recorded on the band's concerts held in Zagreb club Kulušić in February and March 1982. The songs featured Bele's humorous monologues, as well as made-up interviews of Dražen Vrdoljak with the "public" appearing as interludes between songs. The spoken sections dealt humorously with sex and drug abuse, kept up in spirit with the band's self-irony, but also ridiculed Bijelo Dugme leader Goran Bregović and Azra leader Branimir "Džoni" Štulić; on one of the tracks, Bele pathetically declares that Štulić (known for his politically engaged songs) set himself on fire in Zagreb's Republic Square as a sign of protest against the situation in Poland, and holds a comical eulogy. The album featured four different versions of the band's old song "Helga": "original version", "underground version", "New Romantic version" and "Tyrol version", the latter featuring accordions and yodeling. The album also featured a cover of "Roll Over Beethoven" titled "Ko jebe Buldožer" ("Fuck Buldožer"), and covers of "Hey Joe" and "Another Brick in the Wall" (renamed to "Another Freak in the Hall") performed in the style of Montenegrin traditional music by fictional brothers Hubert and Črtomir, portrayed by Bele and Činč. Bele also portrayed an old hippie Franci Kokalj, who performed a song he wrote "when he and his girl hitchhiked back home from Woodstock". The album featured appearances by Oberkreiner duet and female vocal octet Marjetice.

In December 1983, Buldožer released the album Nevino srce (Innocent Heart), with the subtitle Nova zbirka ljubavnih i rodoljubnih pjesama (Another Collection of Love and Patriotic Songs). Although Yugoslav music press wrote about lack of fresh ideas in the band's work, the album nevertheless brought several well-received songs, like "Slovenija", "Mrtvaci" ("Dead Men") and "Smrt Morisona Džima" ("Death of Jim Morrison"), the latter with lyrics in the manner of Serbian epic poetry. The song "Garçon De Yougoslavie" (French for "Yugoslav Boy"), based on Joe Dassin's "Les Champs-Élysées", featured actress Mira Furlan on vocals.

=== Long hiatus (1984–1991) ===
After the release of Nevino srce, the band went on hiatus. Initially, they planned to make a one- or two-year break, but it was eventually prolonged to a decade-long hiatus. Bele moved to Belgrade, where he worked as Helidon representative, Veble dedicated himself to medicine, eventually becoming head of Ljubljana hospital nuclear medicine department, Činč started his own recording studio, Zmazek became a member of Don Mentony Band, and Vran started performing in clubs on the Yugoslav coast and in Italy. In May 1989, Helidon released Buldožer compilation album Nova vremena (New Times).

=== Reunion, comeback album and disbandment (1991–1999) ===
At the beginning of 1990s, the members of the group held occasional rehearsals, gradually working on the songs for their comeback album. The recording sessions and mixing were almost completed, when a fire broke out in Tivoli studio, destroying all the recordings. The band recorded the songs for the second time in Borut Činč's studio, in the lineup consisting of Boris Bele, Borut Činč, Uroš Lovšin, Dušan Vran, and one new member, bass guitarist Ven Jemeršič. The album, entitled Noć (Night), featured songs written during the 1991–1995 period, sung in Slovene and Croatian.

The album was followed by a promotional tour, with larger concerts featuring guest appearances by Belgrade-based singer-songwriter and former Idoli member Vlada Divljan. On Buldožer concert at the 1998 festival Rock Otočec (Rock Island), the band and Vlada Divljan performed a parody of Plavi Orkestar's hit "Ako su to samo bile laži" ("If All of That Were Only Lies") entitled "Ako su to samo bile pare" ("If All of That Was Only Money"). In the summer of 1999, Buldožer and Divljan were scheduled to perform on a festival in Vienna commemorating Woodstock's 30th anniversary, but the performance was cancelled due to NATO bombing of Yugoslavia. At the end of the 1990s, Buldožer once again ended their activity.

=== 2006 reunion ===
In 2006, Racman record label released Buldožer box set Lik i djelo (Biography and Works), featuring reissues of all seven studio albums and the only live album, and the group reunited once again, in the lineup featuring Bele, Činč, Veble, Zmazek and Vran, for a series of performances in former Yugoslav region. During the tour, film director Rudi Uran shot a documentary about the group entitled 4 koncerti za Buldožer in... (4 Concerts for Buldožer And...).

=== Post 2006 ===
Činč continued to work in his studio as studio musician and producer. In 2013, he recorded new-age album Časovne skice (Time Sketches) with guitarist and vocalist Severa Djugin. In 2010s, Bele started the band Duhovi (The Ghosts), recording the 2018 album Duhovi bolje prošlosti (Ghosts of Better Past) with the group.

In 2015, director Varja Močnik and journalist Igor Bašin made a documentary film about the band's debut album. During the same year, Ljubljana art gallery Photon and Kino Šiška Centre for Urban Culture organized an exhibit about Buldožer in order to mark the band's 40th anniversary. The exhibit was entitled Prepovedano plakatiranje: Zgodba o Buldožerju (Postering Prohibited: The Story of Buldožer), and was accompanied by a book edited by curator Miha Colner and featuring texts by Colner, Igor Bašin and Momčilo Rajin.

Uroš Lovšin died on 19 July 2007. Janez Zmazek died on 18 February 2020. Marko Brecelj died on 4 February 2022.

== Influence and legacy ==
What was it that Buldožer did on the album Pljuni istini u oči? It wasn't a direct political subversion, it was something much worse – or better. It was a programmatic album the idea of which was, from the first to the last groove, typical iconoclasm, complete disrespect for the values of the system. They made comedy out of everything they could think of. Although they were good musicians, they ironized the very form of rock, they ironized the themes, they ironized, after all, themselves. And they were successful at doing that.

Zagreb music critic Darko Glavan clumsily tried to inaugurate Buldožer as the forefathers of "wacky rock". He actually didn't have much choice, they were impossible to categorize as anything. Someone else wanted to proclaim them imitators of Frank Zappa, but that was simply impossible: Brecelj was crazier and more entertaining than any Zappa.

With the album Pljuni istini u oči, Buldožer instantly became the second influential band in Yugoslavia: the first one was, of course, Bijelo Dugme. Back then it seemed that the impact of Bijelo Dugme was incomparably bigger. From today's perspective, we know that Buldožer made crucial impact on creativity of the [Yugoslav] scene. From Buldožer's ascendancy rose a number of bands that cherished the culture of authorship. Their album Pljuni istini u oči would have the biggest impact on participants of the [Yugoslav] new wave scene.

— Dušan Vesić in 2020.

Buldožer's 1970s works have been widely praised for their originality and innovativity, and are often compared to the works of Frank Zappa and Monty Python. The band are often described as the pioneers of political provocation on the Yugoslav musical scene and forefathers of the Yugoslav new wave.

Buldožer song "Garçon De Yougoslavie" was covered in 1984 by Yugoslav ska band Skakafci on their 1984 album Igre bez meja (Games Without Frontiers). The song "Yes My Baby No" was covered by Serbian and Yugoslav rock band Bajaga i Instruktori for Srđan Dragojević's 1994 TV film Dva sata kvalitetnog TV programa (Two Hours of Quality TV Programming). The cover was later released on the band's compilation album Neizbrisano (Unerased), under the title "Tribute to Buldožer". Vlada Divljan released a cover of "Novo vrijeme" on his 2000 album Sve laži sveta (All the Lies of the World). Slovenian rock band Rock Partyzani covered "Žene i muškarci" on their 2007 album Dan zmage! (Victory Day!). Slovenian rock band Mi2 covered Buldožer song "Slovenija" on their 2010 album Rokenrol (Rock 'n' Roll). A psychedelic cover of Buldožer song "Ne brini, mama" ("Don't Worry, Mom") from Zabranjeno plakatirati appeared in Srđan Dragojević's 1992 film We Are Not Angels.

In 1998, Pljuni istini u oči was ranked as the 7th and Izlog jeftinih slatkiša was ranked as the 55th on the list of 100 Greatest Albums of Yugoslav Popular Music in the book YU 100: najbolji albumi jugoslovenske rok i pop muzike (YU 100: The Best Albums of Yugoslav Pop and Rock Music). In 2015, Ako ste slobodni večeras was polled No.17, Pljuni istini u oči was polled No.19 and Izlog jeftinih slatkiša was polled No.41 on the list of 100 Greatest Yugoslav Albums published by the Croatian edition of Rolling Stone. In 1987, in YU legende uživo (YU Legends Live), a special publication by Rock magazine, Ako ste slobodni večeras was proclaimed one of 12 best Yugoslav live albums.

In 2000, "Novo vrijeme" was polled No.91 on the Rock Express Top 100 Yugoslav Rock Songs of All Times list. In 2006, "Novo vrijeme" was polled No.76 and "Ne brini, mama" was polled No.98 on the B92 Top 100 Yugoslav songs list.

The lyrics of the band's songs "Novo vrijeme", "Slovenija", "Mrtvaci" and "Vojno lice" ("Army Member") were featured in Petar Janjatović's Pesme bratstva, detinjstva & potomstva: Antologija ex YU rok poezije 1967 - 2007 (Songs of Brotherhood, Childhood & Offspring: Anthology of Ex YU Rock Poetry 1967 – 2007).

== Discography ==
=== Studio albums ===
- Pljuni istini u oči (1975)
- Zabranjeno plakatirati (1977)
- Živi bili pa vidjeli (1979)
- Izlog jeftinih slatkiša (1980)
- Rok end roul (1981)
- Nevino srce (1983)
- Noć (1995)

=== Live albums ===
- Ako ste slobodni večeras (1982)

=== Compilation albums ===
- Nova vremena (1989)
- The Ultimate Collection (2009)

=== Box sets ===
- Lik i djelo (2006)

=== Singles ===
- "Rastem" / "Svaki čovjek ima svoj bluz" (1975)
- "Žene i muškarci" / "Slovinjak punk" (1980)
