= Begnagrad (album) =

Studio album by Begnagrad
- Released: 1982
- Recorded: May 1982
- Studios: Top Ten Studio, Ljubljana
- Genres: Avant-garde rock; progressive rock; jazz rock; folk rock; instrumental rock
- Label: ZKP RTLJ
- Producers: Begnagrad, Neven Smolčič

Begnagrad chronology
Begnagrad (1982)	Jodlovska Urška (1990)

Alternative cover
- 1990 AYYA reissue cover

Begnagrad is the debut studio album by the Yugoslav avant-garde/progressive rock Begnagrad released in 1982. In 1990, the album was reissued by a French label under the title Konzert for a Broken Dance.

== Background ==
Begnagrad was formed in 1976 by Bratko Bibič (accordion), Bogo Pečnikar (clarinet), Vlado Špindler (bass guitar), and Igor Muševič (drums), guitarists Bojan Zidarić, Igor Leonardi and Boris Romih cooperating with them on different occasions. The band performed avant-garde rock with the elements of free jazz, swing, traditional music, but also of pop, and soon gained attention of the audience with their unconventional compositions. After their performance at the prominent Youth Festival in Subotica in 1977, they recorded part of their songs in Radio Novi Sad studios with producer Anđelko Maletić. The recordings should have appeared on their first album, however that record was never released. In 1978, Špindler had to leave the band to serve his mandatory stint in the Yugoslav army, and Begnagrad went on hiatus. The group reunited at the beginning of the 1980s. During the following years, Begnagrad went to numerous lineup and stylistic changes. They recorded their debut album in the lineup featuring Bibič, Pečnikar, Romih, Nino de Gleria (bass guitar), and Aleš Rendla (drums, violin). The album, entitled simply Begnagrad, was released in 1982 through ZKP RTLJ. The songs on the album were composed by Bibič and De Gleria.

== Track listing ==
Side A
No.	Title	Music	Length
1.	"Pjan ska" ("Drunken Ska")	Bratko Bibič	3:16
2.	"Romantična" ("Romantic Song")	Bratko Bibič	4:26
3.	"Bože (Če Bo)" ("God (If He Will)")	Bratko Bibič	4:11
4.	"Cosa Nostra (Waltz)" (Consisting of "Dame in gospodje" ("Ladies and Gentlemen"), "Artistička skupina Begnagrad" ("Art Group Begnagrad") and "Vam vošči......." ("Greetings to You......."))	Bratko Bibič	7:08

Side B
No.	Title	Music	Length
1.	"Narodna i kmentska" ("People's and Peasants' Song")	Bratko Bibič	5:48
2.	"Coc'N Rolla (Ljubljana ponoči)" ("Coc'N Rolla (Ljubljana at Night)")	Nino de Gleria	6:03
3.	"Žvižgovska Urška" ("Whistling Urška")	Nino de Gleria	6:23

== Personnel ==
- Bratko Bibič - accordion, melodica, piano, vocals
- Bogo Pečnikar - clarinet, ocarina, whistling, vocals
- Boris Romih - guitar, percussion, children's instruments, bass (on track A3)
- Nino de Gleria - bass guitar, acoustic bass guitar, mandolin, whistling, voice
- Aleš Rendla - drums, congas, violin

=== Additional personnel ===
- Neven Smolčič - producer
- Dare Novak - engineer
- Peter Kosmač - photography

== Post release ==
The band spent 1983 and 1984 performing mostly in Western Europe. They ended their activity in 1984. In the years following the disbandment, former members of the band would release two album with their recordings from the 1970s, Jodlovska Urška (1990), featuring the material recorded during the 1977 Radio Novi Sad sessions, and Tastare (Theoldwones) (1992), featuring studio and live recordings from 1976 and 1977.

== 1990 album reissue ==
In 1990, Begnagrad was re-released by the French record label AYYA, under the title Konzert for a Broken Dance, featuring a session recording entitled "Tazadnatanova = Thelastnewone" as a bonus tracks. On the reissue, tracks 1 and 2 are switched, and the track "Žvižgovska Urška" is split into "Žvižgovska = Wisteling Ursulla" and half-minute track "Joj Di Di Joj = Joj Di Di Joj". The album featured alternate titles for the tracks and a cover designed by the band's former member Bogo Pečnikar.

=== Track listing ===
No.	Title	Music	Length
1.	"Romantična = The Romantic One"	Bratko Bibič	4:29
2.	"Pjanska = The Drinking One"	Bratko Bibič	3:09
3.	"Bo Že (Če Bo) = Alles Wird Gut (Vieleicht)"	Bratko Bibič	4:11
4.	"Cosa Nostra = Waltz"	Bratko Bibič	7:08
5.	"Narodna / Kmetska = Knecht-Ska"	Bratko Bibič	5:51
6.	"Cocn Rolla = Cocn Rolla"	Nino de Gleria	5:31
7.	"Žvižgovska = Wisteling Ursulla"	Nino de Gleria	5:00
8.	"Joj Di Di Joj = Joj Di Di Joj"	Bratko Bibič	00:25
9.	"Tazadnatanova = Thelastnewone"	Bratko Bibič	8:22

== Critical reception of the reissue ==
Professional ratings
Review scores
Source	Rating
AllMusic	4.5/5 stars

François Couture of AllMusic noted that "the group's highly original blend of Eastern European folk and complex progressive rock elements may not have been everyone's cup of tea, but the level of energy and the raw feelings conveyed by their first proper album make the music more immediate than one would expect".
