= Marko Brecelj =

(born )

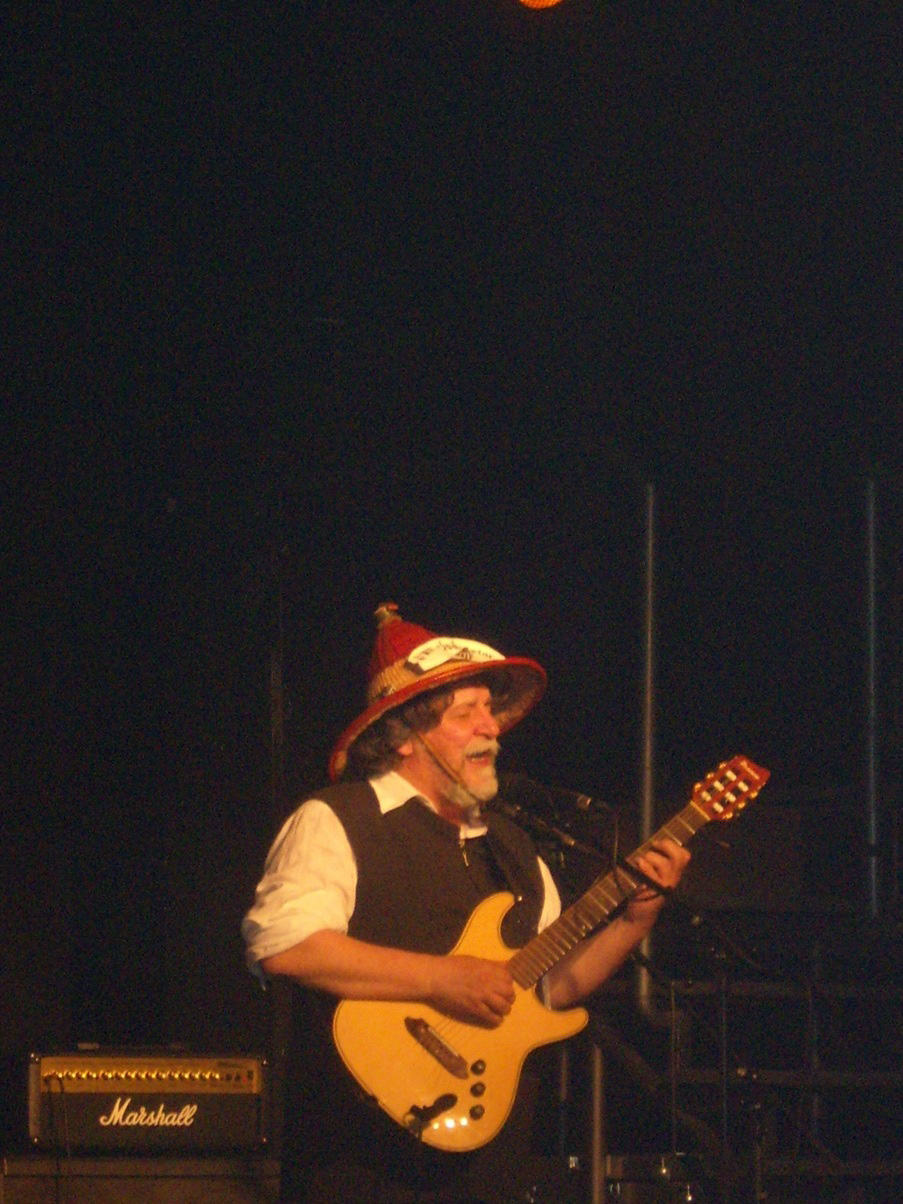
- Marko Brecelj performing in Belgrade in 2007
- Born: 30 April 1951; Sarajevo, PR Bosnia and Herzegovina, FPR Yugoslavia
- Died: 4 February 2022 (aged 70); Koper, Slovenia
- Occupations: Musician; conceptual artist
- Years active: 1973–2022
- Musical career
- Genres: Avant-garde rock; progressive rock; comedy rock; new wave; experimental music
- Instruments: Vocals; guitar; violin
- Labels: ZKP RTLJ; Helidon; Slovenija; ŠKUC Ropot; Nika
- Formerly of: Buldožer; Marjanov Čudni Zajec

Marko Brecelj (born 30 April 1951 – 4 February 2022) was a Slovenian and Yugoslav musician, conceptual artist and activist. Known for his work with the avant-rock band Buldožer and as a solo artist, Brecelj was noted for his experimental and deconstructivist music, humorous and provocative performances and public actions, as well as eccentric public persona.

Brecelj first attracted the attention of the Yugoslav public in early 1970s, as the leader of the band Krik. His first solo album Cocktail, released in 1974, brought an unusual blend of avant-garde and schlager music. In 1975, Brecelj formed Buldožer with former members of the band Sedem Svetlobnih Let, the group gaining large attention of the Yugoslav public with their experimentation with different genres, satirical lyrics and provocative performances. Brecelj left Buldožer after recording three albums with the group, returning to his career of singer-songwriter, maintaining provocative and satirical style established during his stint with Buldožer, closely collaborating on his works with poet and musician Ivan "Feo" Volarič. As an activist, Brecelj expressed his stance on various social issues with a number of imaginative public actions in his home city of Koper and in former Yugoslav region.

== Biography ==
=== Early life ===
Brecelj was born on 30 April 1951 in Sarajevo. He lived in Maribor, eventually moving to Koper. He enrolled in the studies of geology and technical physics at the University of Ljubljana.

=== Musical career ===
==== Early career (early 1970s–1974) ====
Brecelj started his musical career in the quartet Beli Crnci (transl. White Blacks), which performed African-American spirituals. He continued his career in the trio Krik (Scream) as the band's vocalist, guitarist, violinist and songwriter. The band gained the attention of the public after their appearance at the 1973 Youth Festival in Subotica. They appeared at the festival once again in 1974, Brecelj provoking the audience by appearing on stage with his hair dyed green, and winning the Union of Composers of Yugoslavia Award for his song "Duša in jaz" ("Soul and Myself"). At the same edition of the festival, Brecelj's violin was stolen, which led to his decision to give up playing the instrument.

==== Early solo career (1974–1975) ====
Following the success at the 1974 Youth Festival, Brecelj released his first solo album Cocktail, through ZKP RTLJ record label. The album brought an unusual combination of avant-garde and schlager music, with Brecelj's compositions arranged by composer Bojan Adamič and performed by RTV Ljubljana Dance Orchestra. The album also included the song "Hiškar Rogač" that Brecelj recorded with the progressive rock band Sedem Svetlobnih Let (Seven Light Years). The album release was delayed for six months due to Brecelj insisting on a clause of the contract which would state: "ZKP RTLJ commits to buying Marko Brecelj a small rum in the nearby kafana Žito". ZKP RTLJ's editor-in-chief of the time, pianist and composer Jure Robežnik refused to include the clause in the contract, and Brecelj refused to compromise, thus the album release had to be postponed.

In 1976, Cocktail brought Brecelj the Seven Secretaries of SKOJ Award, given to young artists for their achievements in various fields of culture, Brecelj thus becoming the first Yugoslav rock artist to receive the prestigious award. On the award ceremony, he was presented with the award by renowned singer-songwriter Arsen Dedić.

==== Buldožer (1975–1979) ====
In 1975, Brecelj and the members of Seven Svedlobnih Let, which had already gained the attention of the Yugoslav public, formed the band Buldožer (Bulldozer). The first lineup of Buldožer featured Brecelj on vocals, Boris Bele on guitar and vocals, Borut Činč on keyboards, Uroš Lovšin on guitar and Štefan Jež on drums. During his stint with Buldožer, Brecelj gained the attention of the Yugoslav public with his on-stage eccentricities, like unusual monologues, acrobatics, going out on stage in a wheelchair, and setting his hair and beard on fire. The band gained the attention of the country's public and the music press with their unusual sound, dark humor, satirical lyrics, self-irony and provocative performances. After recording two studio albums and a mini album with the band, released to commercial and critical success, Brecelj left the group in 1979, later stating he left Buldožer as they "didn't get along in bed anymore". Although he did not take part in the recording of the band's fourth studio album Izlog jeftinih slatkiša, released in 1980, Brecelj had taken part in the songwriting process leading to album recording, and was credited on the album as lyricist.

==== Post Buldožer (1979–2022) ====
After he left Buldožer, Brecelj formed the duo Zlatni Zubi (Golden Teeth) with poet Ivan "Feo" Volarič. In 1981, Brecelj recorded his first solo release since 1974, a 7-inch single with the songs "Parada" ("Parade"), "Majmuni" ("Apes") and "Trotoari" ("Sidewalks"), announcing the future direction of his solo works with the songs' deconstructionist style. "Majmuni", carrying the subtitle "uspomena bjelom dupetu" ("Memory of White Ass"), ridiculed the most popular Yugoslav rock band of the era, Bijelo Dugme (White Button). The single was Brecelj's first release for the independent record label Helidon. Later in 1981, during Zlatni Zubi performance at the Novi Rock (New Rock) festival in Ljubljana, Brecelj was hit in the head by a rock thrown from the audience, but, despite being injured, continued the concert.

In 1983, Brecelj and Volarič started working with guitarists Leon Ukmar and Taljub Lapajne, bass guitarist Zlatko Bašič, drummer Marjan Medvešćak and keyboardist Robert Vatovec under the name Marjanov Čudni Zajec (Marjan's Strange Rabbit). The band recorded the album Svinjam dijamante (Diamonds before Swine), released in 1985. Brecelj described the album as "schoolboys' half-product released with a ten-year delay", and the band split up after holding only 27 concerts. In 1984, together with Volarič, Brecelj wrote lyrics for songs by the band Srp (Sickle), released on the group's eponymous debut during the same year.

Following the disbandment of Marjanov Čudni Zajec, during 1985 and 1986, Brecelj performed as a solo artist, recording the album Desant na Rt dobre nade (Desant on the Cape of Good Hope). The album, released in 1986, featured the song "Dan republike" ("Republic Day") alongside music originally written for theatre plays. In 1988, with bass guitarist Aleš Jošt and saxophonist Primož Šmit, Brecelj recorded the album Javna vaja (Public Exercise), released in 1988 and featuring new versions of songs from Cocktail and Svinjam dijamante. In 1991, under the moniker Javna Dvaja (The Public Two), Brecelj reissued the songs from Javna vaja on the album titled Moje krave molznice (My Milking Cows), in reference to several re-recording and re-releases of the songs. In 1994, he recorded the album Hojlarija, svinjarija, diareja, gonoreja (Hypocrisy, Piggery, Diarrhea, Gonorrhea) with the punk rock band Strelnikoff. The album featured several different versions of three Buldožer songs, "Novo vrijeme" ("New Times"), "Higijena" ("Hygiene") and "Ko jebe Buldožer" ("Fuck Buldožer"). "Novo vrijeme" was recorded in five different versions, one of them titled "Sexy Disco Mix", and one titled "New Age Mix". "Brecelj and Strelnikoff version of "Ko jebe Buldožer", the song itself being a cover of "Roll Over Beethoven", opens with a sample of Branko Cvejić's voice from the TV series The Unpicked Strawberries.

Since mid-1990s, Brecelj mostly performed alone, without a backing band. In 1996, Nika record label reissued Cocktail on CD, with the songs from "Parada" single and previously unreleased material as bonus. The album was reissued once again in 2015, with different bonus material, and in 2024 it was reissued with the subtitle Obilni vuncabilni. The latter reissue was released to mark the expulsion of Brecelj's Society of Friends of Moderate Progress within the Bounds of the Law from their premises in Koper. Simultaneously with the 2015 reissue of Cocktail, he released the DVD Samospevi (Soliloquys), featuring his new songs with minimalist music videos. Part of the songs from Samospevi were originally written for Brecelj's documentary film Štetjej v jeseni (Torej v Vršac) (Counting in the Autumn (Therefore to Vršac)).

=== Art performances and activism ===
Brecelj held a number of art performances and actions that he described as "soft terrorism". He was the leader of the Society of Friends of Moderate Progress within the Bounds of the Law, and started the Trans-generational Alliance of Dumbasses and the political party Akacije (Acacia). He founded the religious group Nadanje bez razloga (Hope without a Reason). At the Koperground art festival he protested against frequent and loud ringing of church bells with his poster "Kome zvona zvone?" ("For Whom the Bells Toll?"). In 2009, on 25 May (celebrated in SFR Yugoslavia as the Youth Day), he held the performance titled Titova macola (Tito's Sledgehammer) at the Sarajevo's Eternal Flame memorial, crushing the letters TITO made of tomatoes and strawberries with a sledgehammer. In 2012, in Zagreb he held performances titled Magarac u Zagrebu (Donkey in Zagreb) and Sedam sekretara SKOJ-a Cvrkut (Seven Secretaries of SKOJ Chirping), ironically celebrating Croatia joining the European Union. In 2016, he held the performance Publici budućnosti (To the Audience of the Future), reacting to authorities' decision to put barbwire on Slovenia's borders to prevent entrance of illegal immigrants. During the performance, Brecelj demonstrated different kinds of injuries that could be caused by barbwire.

In 2021, a number of Slovenian media published misinformation about Brecelj's death. The cause of misinformation was the announcement of the performance Super, neko je umro (Great, Someone Died), stating that director Zlata Vojnić Kortmiš-Milošev and comic book artist Danilo Milošev "Wostok" would open an exhibit with the "remains of Marko Brecelj". Brecelj reacted to misinformation about his death by holding a spontaneous performance.

Since 1991, Brecelj was the managing director of the Youth Cultural, Social and Multimedia Center in Koper, although he insisted that he was "the director of the Youth Cultural Center's toilet". He was dismissed in January 2015 on the initiative of mayor of Koper. As the center's managing director Brecelj organized large number of concerts by alternative acts from Europe and former Soviet Union republics. Brecelj introduced different ticket prices for different categories of visitors, ranging from lowest prices for the inhabitants of Istria, over more expensive tickets for Slovenian students and the unemployed, to highest ticket prices for all other visitors. After closing time, Brecelj used to drive out the remaining visitors by wildly playing violin.

Brecelj led Koper protests against Pope's visit to Slovenia and against Slovenia joining NATO. For a number of years, he ran for office of Koper mayor, mainly with the intention of hindering other candidates. He wrote critical texts for Koper's local newspaper, often offering the visitors of the city an opportunity to take a picture with him for a price of 120 tolars. He published his own bulletin and wrote a blog.

=== Other activities ===
Brecelj acted in Dušan Prebil's 1988 film Pod sinjim nebom (Under the Grey Sky) and Gregor Božič's 2019 film Stories from the Chestnut Woods.

=== Death ===
Brecelj died on 4 February 2022.

== Influence and legacy ==
Brecelj has received a number of awards for his art and activism, including the Ježek Award for his satirical works in 2019 and the Golden Flute for Lifetime Achievement in 2020.

He was a subject of Janez Burger's 2012 documentary film Priletni parazit, ali kdo je Marko Brecelj? (An Aging Parasite or Who Is Marko Brecelj?), titled after the phrase "an aging parasite" often used by Brecelj when talking about himself. In 2019, Dragan Živadinov directed a theatre play about Brecelj titled Biokosmizem::Izreka (Biocosmism::Statement), with Marko Mlačnik portraying Brecelj.

A number of Buldožer works featuring Brecelj as vocalist and songwriter appeared on lists of best Yugoslav albums and songs. In 1998, Buldožer album Pljuni istini u oči (Spit into the Eyes of Truth) was ranked as the 7th on the list of 100 Greatest Albums of Yugoslav Popular Music in the book YU 100: najbolji albumi jugoslovenske rok i pop muzike (YU 100: The Best Albums of Yugoslav Pop and Rock Music). In 2015, the album was polled No.19 on the list of 100 Greatest Yugoslav Albums published by the Croatian edition of Rolling Stone. In 2000, "Novo vrijeme" was polled No.91 on the Rock Express Top 100 Yugoslav Rock Songs of All Times list. In 2006, "Novo vrijeme" was polled No.76 and "Ne brini, mama" ("Don't Worry, Mom") was polled No.98 on the B92 Top 100 Yugoslav songs list.

The lyrics of Buldožer song "Novo vrijeme", authored by Brecelj, were included in Petar Janjatović's Pesme bratstva, detinjstva & potomstva: Antologija ex YU rok poezije 1967 - 2007 (Songs of Brotherhood, Childhood & Offspring: Anthology of Ex YU Rock Poetry 1967 – 2007).

== Discography ==
=== Solo ===
==== Studio albums ====
- Cocktail (1974)
- Desant na Rt dobre nade (1986)
- Javna vaja (1988)
- Hojladrija, svinjarija, diareja, gonoreja (With Strelnikoff, 1994)

==== Singles ====
- "Duša in jaz" / "Tri ženske" (1974)
- "Parada" / "Majmuni" / "Trotoari" (1981)

==== Compilations ====
- Cocktail / Obilni poslovilni (2024)

==== Video albums ====
- Samospevi (2015)

=== With Buldožer ===
==== Studio albums ====
- Pljuni istini u oči (1975)
- Zabranjeno plakatirati (1977)
- Živi bili pa vidjeli (1979)

==== Singles ====
- "Rastem" / "Svaki čovjek ima svoj bluz" (1975)

=== With Marjanov Čudni Zajec ===
- Svinjam dijamante (1985)
