= Davor Slamnig =

Croatian writer and musician (born 1956)

- Born: 13 March 1956 (age 69); Zagreb, PR Croatia, FPR Yugoslavia
- Occupations: Writer; guitarist; vocalist
- Years active: 1977–present
- Musical career
- Genres: Avant-garde rock; progressive rock; new wave; experimental music; children's music
- Instruments: Guitar; vocals
- Labels: Helidon
- Formerly of: Buldožer; Mira Furlan i Orkestar Davora Slamniga; Dee Dee Mellow

Davor Slamnig (born 13 March 1956) is a Croatian and Yugoslav writer and musician.

== Biography ==
=== Early life ===
Slamnig was born on 13 March 1956 in Zagreb, where he finished his primary education and graduated from grammar school. He allegedly never finished his musical education as well as his studies at the Faculty of Philosophy of the University of Zagreb. He attended further education in the United States, in Bloomington, Indiana and in Chicago.

=== Writing career ===
Slamnig rose to prominence as an author in 1977, when he started publishing his short stories in youth periodicals, mainly in Polet. Those stories were re-published in the collection Čudovište (Monster) in 1980. For Čudovište Slamnig received the Seven Secretaries of SKOJ Award, given to young Yugoslav artists for their achievements in various fields of culture. The next three years he continued publishing short stories, collected in the 1983 book Qwertzu i Opš.

Slamnig resuscitated as an author in 2002, when he published the novel Topli zrak (Hot Air). For the novel he was awarded with Jutarnji list Novel of the Year Award. The novel entered the finals of the Bosnian Meša Selimović Award. In 2005, Slamnig published another collection of short stories, entitled Krumpirova rodbina (Potato's Kin), with stories published from 1986 until 2005. For two stories from the book, "Teletabisi" ("Teletubbies") and "Kak smo postali Dalmatinci" ("How We All Became Dalmatians"), he received the Večernji list Second Prize in 2004, and Ranko Marinković Award and the Večernji list Award in 2006 respectively.

In 2011 Slamnig published the short story "Meaning" in the May/June 2010 International Science Fiction issue of the World Literature Today (WLT) magazine.

=== Musical career ===
Slamnig debuted as a musician with the song "Debil Blues", co-written with Goran "Pipo" Pavelić. The song was simultaneously adapted into a comic by informal leader of the Zagreb comic group Novi kvadrat (The New Square) Mirko Ilić.

In 1979, Slamnig joined the Ljubljana-based avant-rock band Buldožer as the guitarist. He participated in the recording of the band's fourth studio album Izlog jeftinih slatkiša (Shop Window of Cheap Candy), released in 1980. Apart from playing the guitar on the album, Slamnig co-authored the songs "Karlo", "Slovinjak punk" ("Slovenian Punk") and "Žene i muškarci" ("Women and Men"), the latter becoming the band's first radio hit. Following the album promotional tour, Slamnig left the band in 1981.

With actress and singer Mira Furlan, bass guitarist Žarko Mandić and drummer Radovan Lučić, Slamnig recorded the album Mira Furlan i Orkestar Davora Slamniga (Mira Furlan and Davor Slamnig's Orchestra), released in 1983. The then-unknown Srđan Dedić played the piano and synthesizer as guest musician. Almost all the lyrics and music were written by Slamnig, with the lyrics for "Dječačići" ("Little Boys") coauthored by Furlan, and the music for "Samo da te malo" ("Only a Little Bit") by Mandić.

In 1993, Slamnig joined the experimental band Dee Dee Mellow, shortly after it was reformed by the band's original saxophonist and keyboardist Jurij "Kuzma" Novoselić. Slamnig performed with the band until its final dissolution in 1995. Under the name Stričeki i Gljive (Uncles and Mushrooms), the band wrote and performed children's music, releasing their children's songs on the album Mogu ja...! (I Can...!) in 1994.

For a period of time, Slamnig was a member of the rhythm and blues band Pjer Žardin i Njegovi Psi Od Slame (Pjer Žardin and His Straw Dogs).

Slamnig wrote the score for the popular television show Milan Blenton. The score was released in 2021 on the album Milan Blenton. The song "Frida", originally written for the show, was recorded in 1988 by the punk rock band Psihomodo Pop, becoming a large hit for the group.

=== Other activities ===
Slamnig created and recorded over 1000 jingles for the Zagreb Radio 101.

== Bibliography ==
- Čudovište (1980), short story collection
- Qwertzu i Opš (1983), short story collection
- Topli zrak (2002), novel
- Krumpirova rodbina (2005), short story collection

== Discography ==
=== With Buldožer ===
- Izlog jeftinih slatkiša (1980)

=== With Mira Furlan i Orkestar Davora Slamniga ===
- Mira Furlan i Orkestar Davora Slamniga (1983)

=== With Stričeki i Gljive ===
- Mogu ja...! (1994)

=== Solo ===
- Milan Blenton (2021)

== Awards ==
- Seven Secretaries of SKOJ Award, for Čudovište (1980)
- Jutarnji list Novel of the Year Award for Topli zrak (2002)
- Večernji list Second Prize for "Teletabisi" (2004)
- Ranko Marinković Award for "Kak smo postali Dalmatinci" (2006)
- Večernji list Award for "Kak smo postali Dalmatinci" (2006)
