= Andrej Trobentar =

Slovene painter and musician

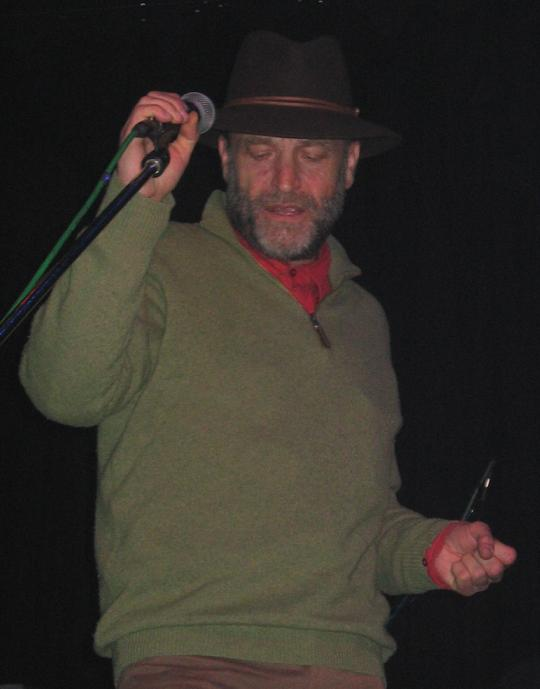
- Born: 22 November 1951 (age 74); Šent Jurij, Slovenia
- Education: Academy of Fine Arts, Ljubljana
- Known for: painting and illustrating
- Notable work: Painting and illustration
- Awards: Levstik Award; 1986 Waitapu and Pavji rep in druge kitajske basni

Andrej Trobentar (born 22 November 1951) is a Slovene painter, illustrator and musician.

== Biography ==
=== Early life and education ===
Trobentar was born in Šent Jurij near Grosuplje in central Slovenia in 1951. He graduated from the Academy of Fine Arts in Ljubljana in 1976 and specialized in painting under Jože Ciuha.

=== Art ===
Trobentar works as a painter, art teacher and illustrator.

=== Musical career ===
Trobentar started his musical career in mid-1970s, first as the vocalist for the band Sedem Svetlobnih Let (transl. Seven Light Years), which would later evolve into Buldožer, and later as the vocalist and leader of Šest Kilometara Na Uro (Six Kilometres per Hour), which would after Trobentar's departure evolve into Begnagrad. In 1978, he joined the progressive rock band Na Lepem Prijazni (Suddenly Polite (Ones)), which had until his arrival performed instrumental music. He remained with Na Lepem Prijazni until their dissolution in 1981, recording the band's eponymous debut album with the group. He took part in the band's reunion in 2005, remaining their vocalist until 2014 and recording two more studio albums with them. He left the band in 2014, releasing his first solo album, titled Dar (Gift), during the same year.

== Awards ==
He won the Levstik Award in 1986 for his illustrations for Joža Horvat's book Waitapu and for the book Pavji rep in druge kitajske basni (The Peacock's Tail and Other Chinese Fables).
