= Saša Novak Radulović =

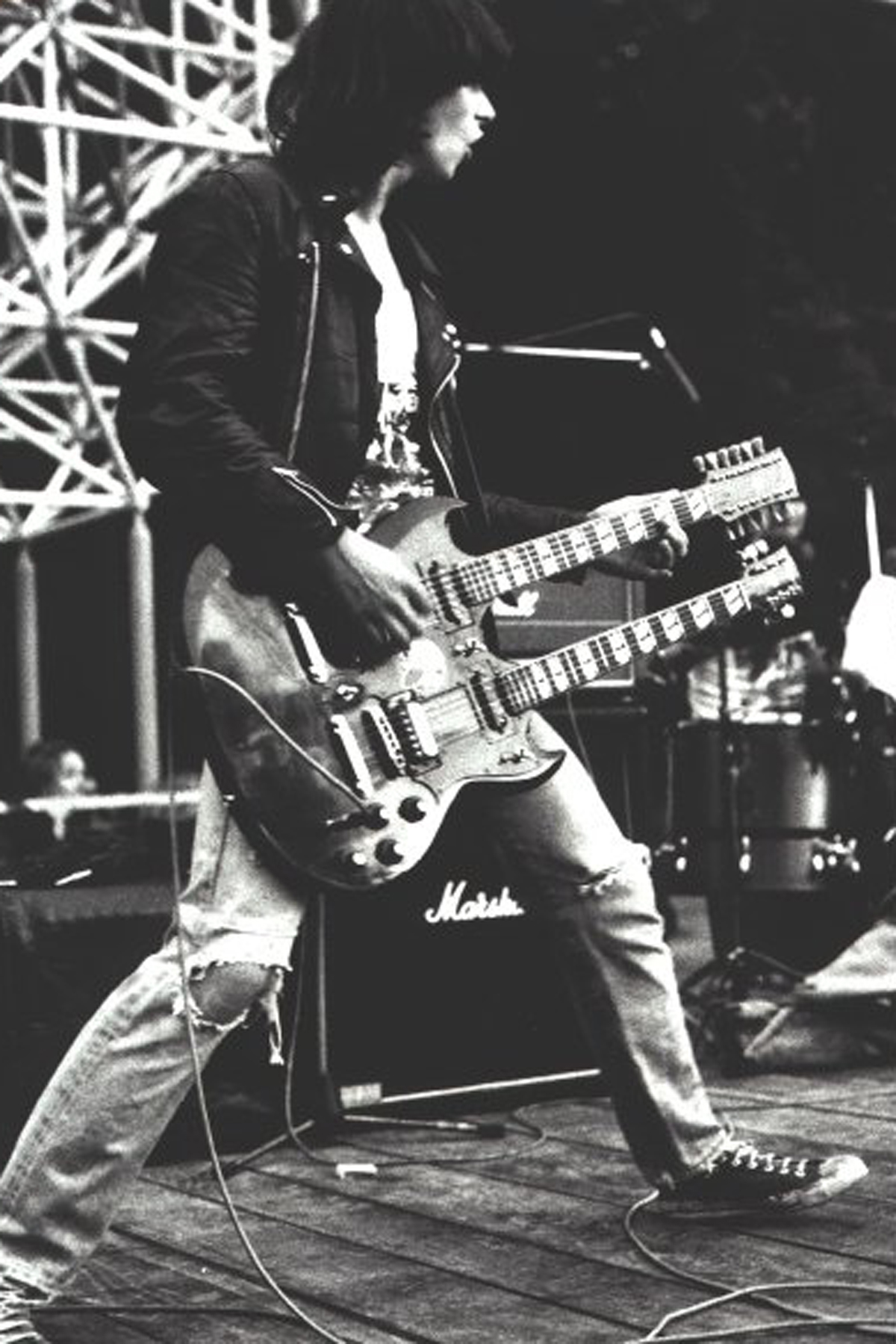
- Novak Radulović in concert in 1989

Background information
- Born: December 22, 1964 (age 61); Zagreb, SR Croatia, SFR Yugoslavia
- Origin: Croatia
- Genres: Punk rock; pop-punk; garage rock; alternative rock
- Occupations: Guitarist, producer
- Instruments: Vocals, guitar, bass guitar, drums, keyboards
- Years active: 1981–present
- Formerly of: Psihomodo Pop
- Website: www.sasanovak.com

Saša Novak Radulović (born 22 December 1964) is a Croatian and Yugoslav musician, best known as the former guitarist of the popular punk rock band Psihomodo Pop.

Radulović started his career in Karlovac as the leader of the local punk rock band, Nužni Izlaz. He gained prominence after joining the Psihomodo Pop in 1985. At the beginning of the 1990s, he collaborated with drummer and producer Ivan "Piko" Stančić, the two, under the name Novak & Kopola, releasing a studio album and recording several patriotic songs for Rock za Hrvatsku various artists album. After releasing four studio albums and a live album with Psihomodo Pop, Radulović left the group in 1994, moving to Germany, where he collaborated with electronic musician and composer Hans-Joachim Roedelius. After a long absence from the Croatian scene, he released his first solo album in 2018.

== Biography ==
=== Early career (1981–1985) ===
Before gaining prominence on the Yugoslav rock scene, Radulović was a member of the punk rock band Nužni Izlaz (Emergency Exit).

=== Psihomodo Pop (1985–1994) ===
In 1985, Radulović joined the punk rock band Psihomodo Pop, which had already gained the attention of the Yugoslav audience and media with their energetic performances. The new lineup of the band, featuring Radulović and another new guitarist, Vlatko Čavar "Brada", changed their musical expression, turning to Ramones-influenced sound. Their debut album Godina zmaja (Year of the Dragon), released in 1988, brought them nationwide popularity, maintained by the 1989 live album Live in Amsterdam and the 1990 studio album Sexy magazin (Sexy Magazine). After releasing two more studio albums with the group, the 1992 Tko je ubio Mickey Mousea? (Who Killed Mickey Mouse?) and the 1993 Srebrne svinje (Silver Pigs), Radulović left the band and moved to Germany.

=== Career in Germany (1994–2017) ===
During the 1990s, Radulović played guitar on albums by German electronic musician and composer Hans-Joachim Roedelius.

=== Solo career (2017–present) ===
After long absence from the Croatian and former Yugoslav scene, Radulović made a comeback with the EP Once Upon a Time (I Was a Rock'n'Roll Star). Alongside his songs, the EP included a cover of Ivo Robić song "Morgen". In 2018, he released his first solo album Ja sam tu (I'm Here). The album included new versions of Psihomodo Pop old songs "Ramona" and "Sve je propalo" ("Everything Failed") and, as a bonus track, a cover of Grupa 220 song "Osmijeh" ("Smile"), recorded live on his performance in Hard Place club. On the recording sessions, Radulović played guitar, bass guitar, drums and keyboards, and the vocals were provided by himself and his daughter Filia Novak.

=== Other activities ===
In 1991, Radulović and drummer and producer Ivan "Piko" Stančić recorded the album Rock akademija (Rock Academy), releasing it under the moniker Novak & Kopola. In 1992, at the time of Croatian War of Independence, the two recorded patriotic songs "Bang – Bang! Vukovar", "Lijepa naša" ("Our Beatufil (Homeland)") and "Hrvatine" ("Die-Hard Croats"). The songs were released on the various artists album Rock za Hrvatsku (Rock for Croatia).

Radulović composed part of the songs recorded by Boris Leiner and Mišo Hrnjak for their 2010 album Viša sila (Higher Power). He made guest appearances on albums by Drago Mlinarec and Piko Stančić, and took part in the recording of 1990 various artists rockabilly album Blue Moon.

== Legacy ==
In 2015, Godina zmaja was polled No.69 on the list of 100 Greatest Yugoslav Albums published by the Croatian edition of Rolling Stone. In 2000, the band's song "Ramona" was polled No.58 on the Rock Express Top 100 Yugoslav Rock Songs of All Times list. In 2006, the band's song "Nema nje (Zauvijek)" ("She's Gone (Forever)") was polled No.86 on the B92 Top 100 Yugoslav songs list.

== Discography ==
=== With Psihomodo Pop ===
==== Studio albums ====
- Godina zmaja (1988)
- Sexy magazin (1990)
- Tko je ubio Mickey Mousa? (1992)
- Srebrne svinje (1993)

==== Live albums ====
- Live in Amsterdam (1989)

==== Video albums ====
- Briljant video-pop (1990)

=== With Novak & Kopola ===
==== Studio albums ====
- Rock akademija (1991)

=== Solo ===
==== Studio albums ====
- Ja sam tu (2018)

==== EPs ====
- Once Upon a Time (I Was a Rock'n'Roll Star) (2017)
