= Don Mentony Band =

- Origin: Slovenia
- Genres: Rock, blues, boogie
- Years active: 1980s–1990s, 2010–present
- Past members: Frenk Brajer; Robert Fritsch; Aleksander Cepuš; Janez Hostnik; Ana Karenini; Jani Kovačič; Miha Mentony; Matej Mršnik; Janez Zmazek-Žan
- Website: www.donmentony.com

Don Mentony Band is a Slovenian rock, blues and boogie band.

Don Mentony Band became recognised in the late 1980s with a remake of the song "Tulsa Time" ("Dobra mrha" in Slovenian). The original members were guitarist Janez Hostnik, bass guitarist Frenk Brajer, drummer Robert Fritsch, singer Jani Kovačič and animator Miha Mentony. Later Janez Zmazek-Žan joined as guitarist. Zmazek soon took over the lead in the band and in early 1992 (after three released albums) the group's bass guitarist and singer left. Zmazek did not want to seek another singer, so he decided to take on lead vocals. In March 1992, Aleksander Cepuš (Alex Bass) joined as bass guitarist.

In April 1992, the renewed band started to perform at concerts. They played two concerts: 20 Years of Val 202 in Križanke (MC ZKP RTV 1992) and a benefit concert for Bosnia and Herzegovina in Hala Tivoli. They recorded the album Ko noč zamenja dan and an album for the singer Janko Ropret. They also performed at the festival Melodije morja in sonca in Portorose and were main guests in a pop workshop in 1992. At the end of 1992, the bass guitarist was replaced by Ana Korenini, who played for three years. During that period, several other guitarists joined to replace Janez Hostnik, who left the band in 1993; first came guitarist Bruno, then Matej Mršnik, and then Zvone Kukec.

After a period of inactivity, the band's frontman gathered a group of musicians in 2010 and resumed performing under this name. They published a best-of live album and have played several concerts since then.

== Discography ==
- Don Menthony Blues Band (without Janez Zmazek-Žan) (ZKP RTV, 1988)
- Dobra mrha (ZKP RTV, 1989)
- Rad bi bil baraba (ZKP RTV, 1990)
- Nezaposlenim vstop prepovedan (ZKP RTV, 1991)
- Ko noč zamenja dan (ZKP RTV, 1992)
- Zmikavti (ZKP RTV, 1993)
- Hopla konopla (ZKP, 1994)
- Prva Petletka (89-94) (1996) (ZKP RTV Slovenija)
- Lenoba (1995)
- Na drugi strani (1997)
- Dobr se mi dogaja (NIKA Records, 2000)
- The Best of - Live (2010) (ZKP RTV Slovenija)
- Don Mentony Band + Janko Ropret: Vrni se (Didakta, 1992)
- Don Mentony Band + Janko Ropret: Jesen (ZKP RTV, 1995)
- 20 let Vala 202 (medley Dobra mrha & Rekla je ne) (ZKP RTV, 1992)
