= Paice =

Paice is a surname. Notable people with the surname include:

- David Paice (born 1983), rugby union footballer
- George Paice (bowls) (born 1941), New Zealand-based Falkland Islands Lawn Bowler
- George Paice (painter) (1854–1925), British landscape, canine, hunting, and equestrian painter
- Ian Paice (born 1948), English musician and drummer with Deep Purple
- Jacky Paice, founder of the British charity Sunflower Jam, wife of Deep Purple drummer Ian Paice
- James Paice (born 1949), English Conservative Party politician
- Jill Paice (born 1980), American actress best known for musical theatre roles
- Margaret Paice (1920–2016), Australian children's writer and illustrator
- Mervyn Paice, kidnap and murder victim in the 1947 Sargeants Affair

== See also ==
- Pace (surname)
- PACE (disambiguation)
- Paico (disambiguation)
- Paicu (disambiguation)
- Paige (disambiguation)
- Pais (disambiguation)
- Paix
