= Steven J. Sibener =

American scientist

- Born: Brooklyn, NY
- Employer: The University of Chicago
- Known for: Physical Chemistry, Surface Chemistry, and Nanoscience
- Spouse: Linda Young

Academic background
- Education: Erasmus Hall High School; University of Rochester (ScB in chemistry and a BA in physics, Honors); University of California, Berkeley (MA, PhD); Bell Laboratories (Postdoctoral)
- Website: https://chemistry.uchicago.edu/steven-j-sibener

Steven J. Sibener (born 1954) is an American physical chemist and nanoscientist. He is the Carl William Eisendrath Distinguished Service Professor in the Department of Chemistry and the James Franck Institute at the University of Chicago, and a Fellow of the UChicago Pritzker School of Molecular Engineering. His research uses molecular beam scattering, scanning probe microscopy, numerical simulation, and theory to study gas–surface interactions, the atomic-level dynamical properties of interfaces, and chemical kinetics.

== Early life and education ==
Sibener was born in 1954 in Brooklyn, New York, and grew up in the Flatbush neighborhood, attending Erasmus Hall High School. He received an ScB in chemistry and a BA in physics, both with honors, from the University of Rochester in 1975. In the summers of 1974 and 1975 he worked at the Eastman Kodak Research Laboratories. He earned an MS (1977) and PhD (1979) in chemistry at the University of California, Berkeley, under Nobel laureate Yuan T. Lee.

== Career ==
Sibener accepted an assistant professorship at the University of Chicago while still a graduate student at Berkeley. Before taking up the position in 1980, he spent a year as a postdoctoral fellow at Bell Laboratories in Murray Hill, New Jersey, working with Mark J. Cardillo.

At Chicago, Sibener directed the James Franck Institute from 2001 to 2007 and again from 2018 to 2021, a period that included the design and construction of the university's Gordon Center for Integrative Science. He directed the university's NSF Materials Research Science and Engineering Center from 1997 to 2001. He also directed the multi-university DoD MURI Center for Materials Chemistry in the Space Environment (2001–2006) and the NSF Center for Energetic Non-Equilibrium Chemistry at Interfaces (2009–2012). He chaired the Division of Chemical Physics of the American Physical Society in 1996.

Sibener chaired the two university faculty committees that recommended establishing the Institute for Molecular Engineering, now the UChicago Pritzker School of Molecular Engineering. He was the inaugural director of its Water Research Initiative. He has been a co-lead of superconducting radio-frequency materials research at the NSF Science and Technology Center for Bright Beams.

== Research ==
Sibener's research spans surface and materials chemistry and physics, including interfacial reaction dynamics, gas–surface interactions, nanoscience, polymeric thin films, water and ice chemistry, materials chemistry in the space environment, and superconducting RF materials. His group extended helium atom scattering to the study of surface phonons and has used supersonic molecular beams to study energy transfer and oxidation reactions involving energetic atomic and molecular oxygen. His group has also reported approaches to isotope separation based on gas-surface interactions, including atomic diffraction of neon, preferential embedding of heavier xenon isotopes in amorphous ice, and, in simulations, differential condensation of methane isotopes.

Sibener's notable students include Miriam Freedman and Seth Darling.

== Honors and Awards ==
Sibener's honors include the Marlow Medal of the Faraday Division of the Royal Society of Chemistry (1988), the Arthur W. Adamson National Award for Distinguished Service in the Advancement of Surface Chemistry of the American Chemical Society (2012), the Prairie Chapter Award for Outstanding Research of the American Vacuum Society (2012), and the 2023 Ira Remsen Award of the American Chemical Society. A Festschrift issue of The Journal of Physical Chemistry C was published in his honor in 2015.

He is a Fellow of the American Physical Society (1997), the American Association for the Advancement of Science (2006-), the American Chemical Society (2016), the American Vacuum Society (2016), and the Royal Society of Chemistry. He was twice elected a Visiting Fellow of JILA (1992–1993 and 2007–2008) and gave the Schulich Visiting Professor Lectures at the Technion in 2013. Early in his career he received a Camille and Henry Dreyfus Young Faculty in Chemistry Award (1980), was an Alfred P. Sloan Foundation Research Fellow (1983–1987), and received an IBM Faculty Development Award (1984–1986).

He served as Chairman, Division of Chemical Physics, American Physical Society (1996) and a Visiting Fellow, Joint Institute for Laboratory Astrophysics, Univ. of Colorado, Boulder (1992–1993).

== Personal life ==
Sibener is married to atomic and X-ray physicist Linda Young.
