= Pais (disambiguation) =

Pais or PAIS may refer to:

== Politics ==
- País, a Chilean political party
- PAIS Alliance, a political party in Ecuador
- Partido pa Adelanto I Inovashon Soshal, a political party in Curaçao

== People ==
- a blanket term for Ipai and Paipai peoples of California and Baja California, also known as Kumeyaay

== Other uses ==
- Pais (surname)
- Pais, a Chilean red wine grape
- Păiș, a river of Romania
- Pais (moth), a synonym of the moth genus Brephos
- PAIS International, an academic journal database
- Pais Movement, a global Christian organization
- Partial androgen insensitivity syndrome, a condition that results in the partial inability of a cell to respond to androgens
- Payız, a village in Azerbaijan
- Payot, a hairstyle worn by some Orthodox Jewish males
- Post-acute infection syndrome

== See also ==
- El País (disambiguation)
