= Pais (surname) =

Pais is a Portuguese surname. Notable people with the surname include:

- Abraham Pais (1918–2000), American physicist
- Arie Pais (1930–2022), Dutch politician
- Bruno Pais (born 1981), Portuguese triathlete
- Didier Païs (born 1983), French wrestler
- Diego Joaquín País (born 1976), Argentine footballer
- Elísio Pais (born 1998), Portuguese footballer
- Elza Pais (born 1958), Portuguese sociologist and politician
- Epitácio Pais (1924–2009), Goan Indian writer
- Ettore Pais (1856–1939), Italian historian and politician
- Fábio Pais (born 1996), Portuguese footballer
- Frank País (1934–1957), Cuban revolutionary
- Gualdim Pais (1118–1195), Portuguese crusader and Knight Templar
- João Pedro Pais, Portuguese musician
- José da Silva Pais (1679–1760), Portuguese colonial administrator
- Josh Pais (born 1958), American actor
- Leonardo Pais (born 1994), Uruguayan football player
- Melissa Pais (born 1983), Indian actress
- Nicolae Păiș (1887–1952), Romanian naval officer
- Rene Pais (born 1988), Estonian DJ and record producer
- Salvatore Pais (born 1967), American engineer
- Sidónio Pais (1872–1918), Portuguese politician and diplomat
- Sol Pais (2001–2019), American student briefly wanted by the FBI
