= Edl Schamiloglu =

American physicist, electrical engineer, and inventor

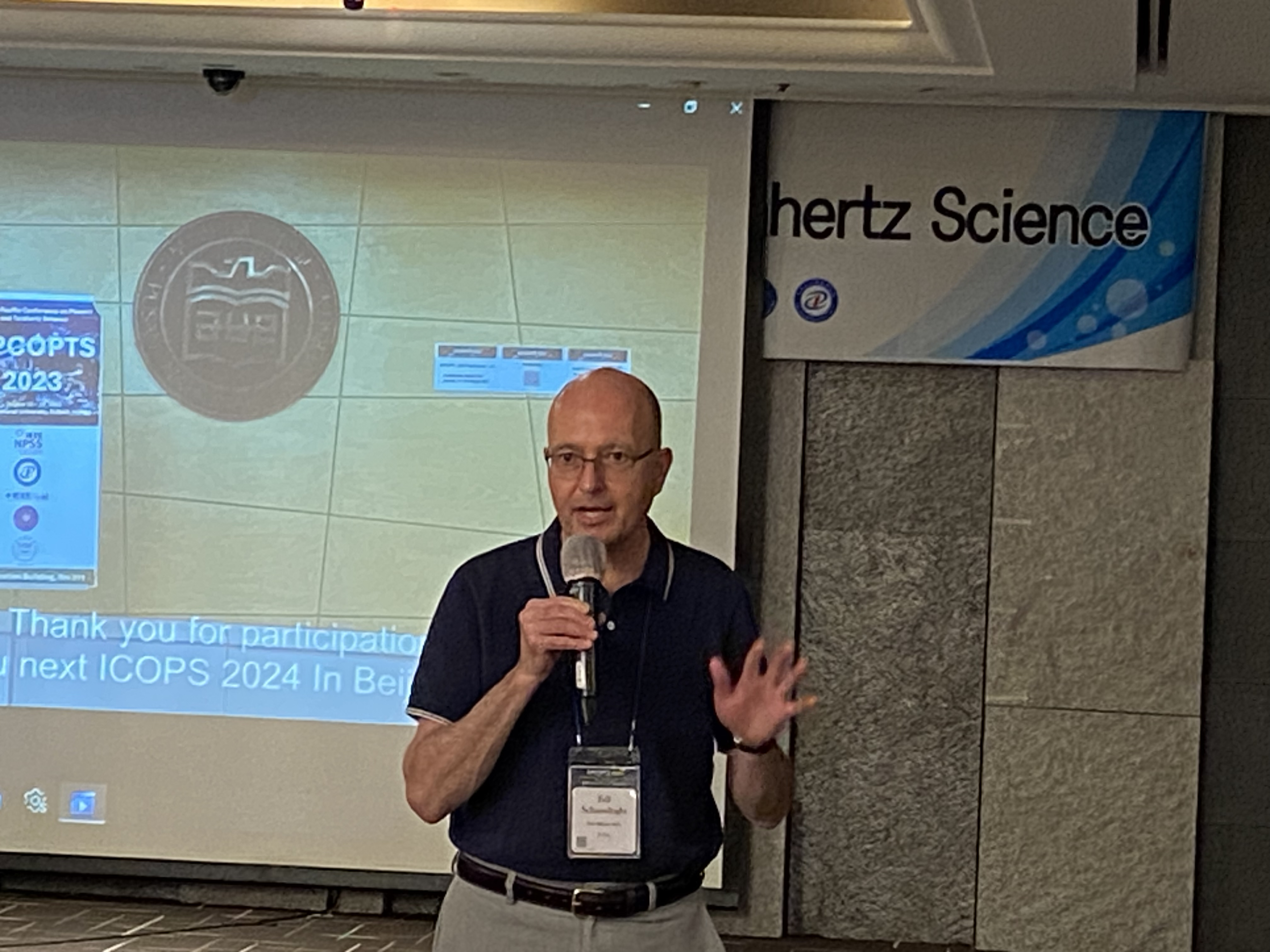
- Schamiloglu presenting a plenary talk at the 2023 Asia Pacific Conference on Plasma and THz Science, Busan, Korea
- Born: Edl Schamiloglu; 1959 (age 66–67); The Bronx, New York, U.S.
- Education: Columbia University (BS, MS); Cornell University (PhD)
- Known for: Pulsed power
- Scientific career
- Fields: Physics; Electrical engineering
- Workplaces: University of New Mexico
- Thesis: Proton ring translation in a magnetized plasma (1988)

Edl Schamiloglu (born 1959) is an American physicist, electrical engineer, pulsed power expert, inventor, and distinguished professor in the department of electrical and computer engineering at the University of New Mexico. He has been known in public media for his expertise in the design and operation of directed-energy weapons. He is also known for his assessment on the possible origins of alleged health damages presumably caused on U.S. embassy personnel in Cuba in 2016 as part of the Havana syndrome incident. He is the founding director of the recently launched UNM Directed Energy Center. Schamiloglu is a book author and co-editor, and has received numerous awards for his academic achievements. He is a Fellow of the Institute of Electrical and Electronics Engineers and the American Physical Society. Starting on July 1, 2024, Schamiloglu was selected as Editor-in-Chief of the IEEE Transactions on Plasma Science, where he succeeds Steven J. Gitomer who has held that role for over 40 years. In July 2025 he was appointed a Nonresident Fellow, Center for Disruptive Technology and Future Warfare, National Defense University, Washington, DC.

== Early life and education ==
Schamiloglu was born in The Bronx in 1959 to Tatar parents from Russia who wed in Istanbul in 1957, where their families had independently arrived as political refugees. His only brother, Uli Schamiloglu, is professor and chair of the department of Kazakh Language and Turkic Studies at Nazarbayev University in Nursultan, Kazakhstan.

Schamiloglu attended the Bronx High School of Science. In 1979, he obtained a Bachelor of Science in applied physics and applied mathematics and in 1981 a Master of Science degree in plasma physics from Columbia University. In 1988, he earned a PhD in engineering (with a minor in mathematics) from Cornell University.

== Career ==
Schamiloglu has been a faculty member at University of New Mexico since 1988. At the UNM School of Engineering, he has successively been Regents' Lecturer from 1996 to 1999, ECE Gardner-Zemke Professor at the Electrical and Computer Engineering Department (since 2000), and distinguished professor since 2014. Also at the University of New Mexico, he has been associate chair and director of the Graduate Program (2000–2001), director of the School of Engineering Research Center COSMIAC (2015-2017), associate dean for research and innovation (2017-2023), and special assistant to the provost for laboratory relations (2018-2025). He is also president of the SUMMA Foundation, an independent, philanthropic organization promoting scientific and educational activities in the field of electromagnetics.

At University of New Mexico, he established a program for research and education in plasma science involving pulsed power and intense beam-driven, high power microwave devices. He founded the Pulsed Power, Beams and Microwaves Laboratory (1989), where for many years his team have been pursuing research in areas such as modeling of electromagnetic systems, directed energy microwaves, and the effects of high power microwaves on systems.

Acting as a principal investigator, or leading multilateral alliances, Schamiloglu's laboratory has received research subsidies of millions of dollars often originating from the US Department of Defense, In 2020, he led a five-university inter-institutional team sponsored by the Air Force, which was selected for a Multidisciplinary University Research Initiative (MURI) Award from the United States Department of Defense to explore the Fundamental Limits to High Power Electromagnetic Amplification.

As a principal co-investigator, Schamiloglu became a founding member of the NSF Directorate for Engineering's sponsored Engineering Research Visioning Alliance (ERVA), together with Dorota Grejner-Brzezińska from The Ohio State University (now Research Vice-chancelor at UW Madison), Anthony Boccanfuso from the University Industry Demonstration Partnership (UIDP), Barry W. Johnson from the University of Virginia, and Charles Johnson-Bey, of Booz Allen Hamilton. Johnson's position at ERVA was later filled by Pramod Khargonekar from the University of California, Irvine.

Schamiloglu has taught electromagnetics, plasma physics, neurosystems engineering, and advanced mathematics. He has been an invited lecturer at institutions in the US, UK, India and China. He has supervised over eighty M.S. and Ph.D. dissertations in related fields. Also, his laboratory has hosted many international visiting scientists since 1991.

As a special assistant to the provost, Schamiloglu aided in the development of working relations between the University of New Mexico and United States Department of Energy national laboratories.

In 2002, he was elected a Fellow of the Institute of Electrical and Electronics Engineers (IEEE) "For contributions to the generation and propagation of intense pulsed charged particle beams." In 2020, he became a Fellow of the American Physical Society.

== Works ==
=== Papers ===
Schamiloglu has published hundreds of peer-reviewed academic articles. His citations can be retrieved from his page on Google Scholar. Some of his most cited papers are:

- Fuks, Mikhail; Schamiloglu, Edl (2005-11-10). "Rapid Start of Oscillations in a Magnetron with a "Transparent" Cathode". Physical Review Letters. 95 (20): 205101. doi:10.1103/PhysRevLett.95.205101. ISSN 0031-9007.
- Schamiloglu, Edl (2014-08-18). "Enhanced surface flashover strength in vacuum of polymethylmethacrylate by surface modification using atmospheric-pressure dielectric barrier discharge". Applied Physics Letters. 105 (7): 071607. doi:10.1063/1.4893884. ISSN 0003-6951.
- Fuks, Mikhail I; Schamiloglu, Edl (2010-06). "70% Efficient Relativistic Magnetron With Axial Extraction of Radiation Through a Horn Antenna". IEEE Transactions on Plasma Science. 38 (6): 1302–1312. doi:10.1109/TPS.2010.2042823. ISSN 0093-3813

=== Books ===
- High-Power Microwave Sources and Technologies (2001), Robert J. Barker, Edl Schamiloglu (co-editors), New York: IEEE Press/Wiley. 2001. ISBN 978-0-470-54487-7. OCLC 557402344.
- High Power Microwaves, 4th edition (2025), James Benford, Edl Schamiloglu, Jacob Stephens, John A. Swegle, Peng Zhang (authors), CRC Press. ISBN 978-1032250465, OCLC on1464287136
- High power microwave sources and technologies using metamaterials (2021), John W. Luginsland, Jason A. Marshall, Arje Nachman, Edl Schamiloglu (co-editors), IEEE Press series on RF and microwave technology (First ed.) Hoboken, New Jersey: Wiley-IEEE Press. ISBN 978-1-119-38446-5, OCLC 1031456950
- Recent Advances in High-Power Electromagnetics (2025), Vega, Felix; Morai, Nicolas; Schamiloglu, Edl; Kasmi, Chaouki (co-editors), London: IET/SciTech Publishing. ISBN 978-1839539473

=== Service ===
Schamiloglu has often been a committee member and chair at UNM, IEEE and National Academies. He served on the external advisory board for Sandia National Laboratories, REHEDS Foundation, Army's Extramural Basic Research Program in Electronics (ARO), K&A Wireless, Directed Energy Professional Society, Pulsed Power Conferences, Inc., SUMMA, and EPSCoR/IDeA Foundations. He was also founding member (2016-2020) of the Matter and Radiation at Extremes Editorial Advisory Board (an Open Access Journal).

=== Patents ===
Schamiloglu is a co-inventor of several patents for devices often related to the operation of magnetrons.

== Honors ==
Schamiloglu's academic achievements have been recognized by many awards. Within UNM he received Research Excellence Awards in 1992, 2001 and 2017, also Creativity Awards in 2011, 2012, 2013, 2018 and 2019. He was selected as a UNM Academic Leadership Fellow from 2013 to 2015, and received the Gardner-Zemke Research Award in 2016.

Within the Institute of Electrical and Electronics Engineers (IEEE), his awards include:

- 2002: Elected Fellow "For Contributions to the Generation and Propagation of Intense Pulsed Charged Particle Beams"
- 2008: Albuquerque Section Outstanding Engineering Educator Award
- 2013: Nuclear and Plasma Sciences Society's Richard F. Shea Distinguished Member Award "For Outstanding Contributions to its Technical Committees"
- 2015: NPSS PPST Peter Haas Award "For Research in the Area of Pulsed Power, Beams, and Microwaves, and for his Dedicated Service to the Current and Future Pulsed Power Community through his Leadership and Educational Endeavors"
- 2019: Nuclear and Plasma Sciences Society's 2019 Magne "Kris" Kristiansen Award for Contributions to Experimental Nuclear and Plasma Science

Other awards he has received include:

- 2003: City of Albuquerque Goodwill Ambassador Award
- 2011: CST (Journal) University Publication Award
- 2012: AFOSR 60th Anniversary Commemorative Medal for Leadership in Directed Energy
- 2014: IEC 1906 Leadership Award, given for his service leading SC77C
- 2016: Institute of Physics (UK) Outstanding Reviewer Award for Journal of Physics D: Applied Physics
- 2020: Elected Fellow of the Americal Physical Society
