= Edward Thomas (physicist) =

American plasma physicist

Edward E. Thomas Jr.
- Education: Florida Tech (B.S.); MIT (M.S.); Auburn University (Ph.D.)
- Known for: Dusty plasmas
- Scientific career
- Fields: Plasma physics
- Institutions: Auburn University
- Thesis: (1996)
- Website: Homepage

Edward E. Thomas Jr. is an American plasma physicist and a Professor of Physics at Auburn University. He currently serves as the university's associate dean for research and graduate studies. He was also the university's Charles W. Barkley Endowed Professor and diversity faculty mentor for the office of inclusion and diversity. He is a fellow of the National Society of Black Physicists (2011), the Alabama Academy of Sciences (2012) and the American Physical Society (2015).

Thomas's work involves experimental and computational plasma physics, specifically in the areas of dusty plasmas and the flow of highly magnetized plasmas. He is currently the director of Auburn University's Magnetized Plasma Research Laboratory, a multi-user facility for the study of highly-magnetized dusty plasmas.

== Early life and career ==
Thomas received a Bachelor of Science from Florida Institute of Technology in 1989. He also attended the Massachusetts Institute of Technology (MIT) for graduate studies, working on the Alcator C-Mod and then earning a masters degree in 1993. He later moved to Auburn University where he graduated in 1996 with a Ph.D. in Physics and won an Outstanding Dissertation Award from the National Society of Black Physicists.

Upon graduation, Thomas began working as an assistant professor at Fisk University until 1999. He later returned to Auburn and joined the physics department, where he was promoted to associate professor in 2002 and then full professor in 2007. In 2012, Thomas became the Lawrence C. Wit Professor at the College of Science and Mathematics, and in 2015, the Charles W. Barkley Endowed Professor in the Department of Physics. In 2017, Thomas was promoted to Associate Dean for Research and Graduate Studies and relinquished his role as Lawrence C. Wit Professor.

== Scientific contributions ==
Thomas studies multiple aspects of plasma physics, including wave-particle interactions in plasma-phase materials and the effects of microgravity upon dusty plasmas.

Between 1998 and 1999 while at Fisk University and subsequently at Auburn University, Thomas received a series of National Science Foundation (NSF) grants to develop the use of particle image velocimetry in the study of dusty plasmas. He was later honored for this work in 2015 by election as a Fellow to the American Physical Society.

In 2009, Thomas led the development of the Magnetized Dusty Plasma Experiment (MDPX), a US$2.1 million superconducting magnet laboratory funded by Auburn University and the NSF. The experiment was designed as part of a multi-user collaborative facility for the study of dusty plasmas (i.e. the Magnetized Plasma Research Laboratory) and was completed in May 2014. Thomas then began operation of the facility as its director, together with his colleague Uwe Konopka.

In 2015, Thomas served an associate editor of the Journal of Plasma Physics.

== Honors and awards ==
Thomas was elected a fellow the National Society of Black Physicists in 2011 and the Alabama Academy of Sciences in 2012. In 2015, Thomas was elected a Fellow of the American Physical Society for "the development of particle-image velocimetry in the study of dusty plasmas and for exemplary service to the plasma physics community".

== Selected publications ==
- DuBois, A. M.; Thomas, E.; Amatucci, W. E.; Ganguli, G. (2013). "Plasma Response to a Varying Degree of Stress". Phys. Rev. Lett. 111 (14) 145002. Bibcode:2013PhRvL.111n5002D. doi:10.1103/PhysRevLett.111.145002. PMID 24138246.
- Fisher, R.; Avinash, K.; Thomas, E.; Merlino, R.; Gupta, V. (2013). "Thermal energy density of dust in dusty plasmas: Experiment and theory". Phys. Rev. E. 88 (3) 031101. Bibcode:2013PhRvE..88c1101F. doi:10.1103/PhysRevE.88.031101. PMID 24125206.
- Fisher, R. K.; Thomas, E. E. (2013). "Weakly Coupled Dusty Plasma With a High Dust Temperature and Low Thermal Energy Density". IEEE Trans. Plasma Sci. 41 (4): 784–787. Bibcode:2013ITPS...41..784F. doi:10.1109/TPS.2012.2230191. S2CID 33273038.
- Thomas, E.; Merlino, R. L.; Rosenberg, M. (2013). "Design Criteria for the Magnetized Dusty Plasma experiment". IEEE Trans. Plasma Sci. 41 (4): 811–815. Bibcode:2013ITPS...41..811T. doi:10.1109/TPS.2012.2236360. S2CID 25752817.
- DuBois, A. M.; Arnold, I.; Thomas, E.; Tejero, E.; Amatucci, W. E. (2013). "Electron-ion hybrid instability experiment upgrades to the Auburn Linear Experiment for Instability Studies". Rev. Sci. Instrum. 84 (4): 043503–043503–6. Bibcode:2013RScI...84d3503D. doi:10.1063/1.4799288. PMID 23635192.
