= Saviour Presby =

Junior high school in Ghana

Saviour Presby is a junior high school in Ghana. It is located in Madina west in the Municipal of la nkwantanang municipal madina in the greater Accra region of Ghana. As head teacher, Robert Siaw Ntiamoah introduced a Pais programme into the school.
