= Catherine Ribeiro + Alpes =

French musical group

- Origin: France
- Genres: Psychedelic rock, avant-garde, folk rock, progressive rock
- Years active: 1968–1981
- Labels: Philips Records; Fontana Records; Festival Records
- Past members: Catherine Ribeiro; Patrice Moullet

The French band Catherine Ribeiro + Alpes formed in 1968. It consisted of singer Catherine Ribeiro and composer Patrice Moullet [fr]. Every record featured different members. The two used to be in the band Catherine Ribeiro + 2Bis but decided to change the name after their first record. While their style was mostly folk and psychedelic rock in their first years, they also included elements of avant-garde in their music. Catherine Ribeiro, known for her chaotic and expressive singing style, often penned their lyrics that addressed political and social issues. They disbanded in 1981.

The band's first three albums, N°2, Âme Debout, and Paix, were given a joint review by Pitchfork, which rated them 8.3, 8.2 and 8.5 respectively.

== Discography ==
Catherine Ribeiro + 2Bis

- Catherine Ribeiro + 2Bis (1969)

Catherine Ribeiro + Alpes

- N°2 (1970)
- Ame Debout (1971)
- Paix (1972)
- Le Rat Dèbile Et L'Homme Des Champs (1974)
- Libertes (1975)
- Le Temps De L'Autre (1977)
- Passions (1979)
- La Deboussole (1980)
