= Salvatore Pais =

Romanian-American aerospace engineer and inventor

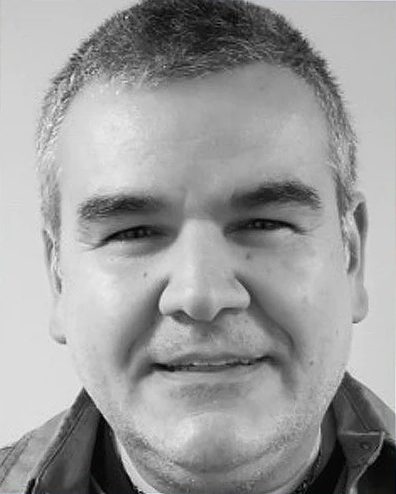
- Born: Salvatore Cezar Pais; September 7, 1967 (age 59); Romania
- Citizenship: United States
- Occupations: Aerospace engineer, inventor
- Known for: "UFO patents" filed for the U.S. Navy

Academic background
- Education: Case Western Reserve University
- Thesis: Bubble generation in a continuous liquid flow under reduced gravity conditions (1999)
- Doctoral advisor: Yasuhiro Kamotani; Simon Ostrach

Academic work
- Discipline: Aerospace engineering, Mechanical engineering
- Institutions: NAWCAD; United States Navy Strategic Systems Programs; United States Air Force; United States Space Force
- Main interests: Electromagnetic field generation, fusion energy, advanced propulsion

Salvatore Cezar Pais (born September 7, 1967) is a Romanian-American aerospace engineer and inventor. He currently works for the United States Space Force, having previously been employed at the Naval Air Warfare Center Aircraft Division (NAWCAD) at Naval Air Station Patuxent River, the U.S. Navy's Strategic Systems Programs (SSP), and the United States Air Force.

Beginning in 2015, Pais filed a series of patent applications on behalf of the U.S. Navy describing technologies with radical claims, including a room temperature superconductor, a compact fusion reactor, an inertial mass reduction device, and a high-frequency gravitational wave generator. Collectively dubbed the "UFO patents" in the media, these inventions attracted widespread attention for their potential energy and military applications, but also significant skepticism from physicists who questioned their scientific basis. The Navy spent over $500,000 testing Pais's core concept, the "Pais Effect," from 2016 to 2019, but NAWCAD concluded that the effect could not be proven. No working prototype of any of the patented inventions was ever produced, and multiple physicists consulted by journalists described the patents as containing pseudoscientific language. Some commentators have speculated that the patents may constitute disinformation intended to mislead the United States' strategic adversaries about the direction of American defense research.

== Education and doctoral research ==
Diagram of a reduced-gravity manoeuvre known as parabolic flight of the type Pais undertook during his doctoral research. Source: NASA

Pais was born in Romania in 1967 and emigrated to the United States at approximately age thirteen. He was raised in New York City and attended Brooklyn Technical High School. Pais then attended Case Western Reserve University in Cleveland, Ohio, where he earned a Bachelor of Science degree in 1990 and a Master of Science degree in mechanical engineering in 1993. His master's thesis was titled "Design of an experiment for observation of thermocapillary convection phenomena in a simulated floating zone under microgravity conditions."

Pais received his Ph.D. in mechanical and aerospace engineering from Case Western Reserve in 1999. His doctoral dissertation, "Bubble Generation in a Continuous Liquid Flow Under Reduced Gravity Conditions," examined bubble generation behavior under both co-flow and cross-flow configurations, requiring multiple parabolic flights to simulate a microgravity environment. His doctoral advisors were Yasuhiro Kamotani and Simon Ostrach, both of whom had conducted Spacelab experiments in microgravity conditions aboard the Space Shuttle mission STS-50 in 1992. Pais's doctoral research was sponsored by NASA.

== Career ==
Pais has presented at American Institute of Aeronautics and Astronautics conferences over the years.

=== Early career at NAWCAD ===
After completing his doctorate, Pais worked as a scientist and aerospace engineer at the Naval Air Warfare Center Aircraft Division (NAWCAD), headquartered at Naval Air Station Patuxent River in Maryland. According to a 2019 author biography published in IEEE Transactions on Plasma Science, his work with the Department of Defense involved "advanced knowledge of theory, analysis, and modern experimental and computational methods in aerodynamics, along with an understanding of air-vehicle and missile design, especially in the domain of hypersonic power plant and vehicle design."

=== Transfers within the defense establishment ===
In June 2019, Pais left NAWCAD and transferred to the U.S. Navy's Strategic Systems Programs (SSP), the organization responsible for the development and sustainment of the Navy's submarine-launched ballistic missiles. In January 2021, he transferred to the United States Air Force. As of 2025, Pais works for the United States Space Force and is reportedly based in Bonn, Germany.

== Patents ==
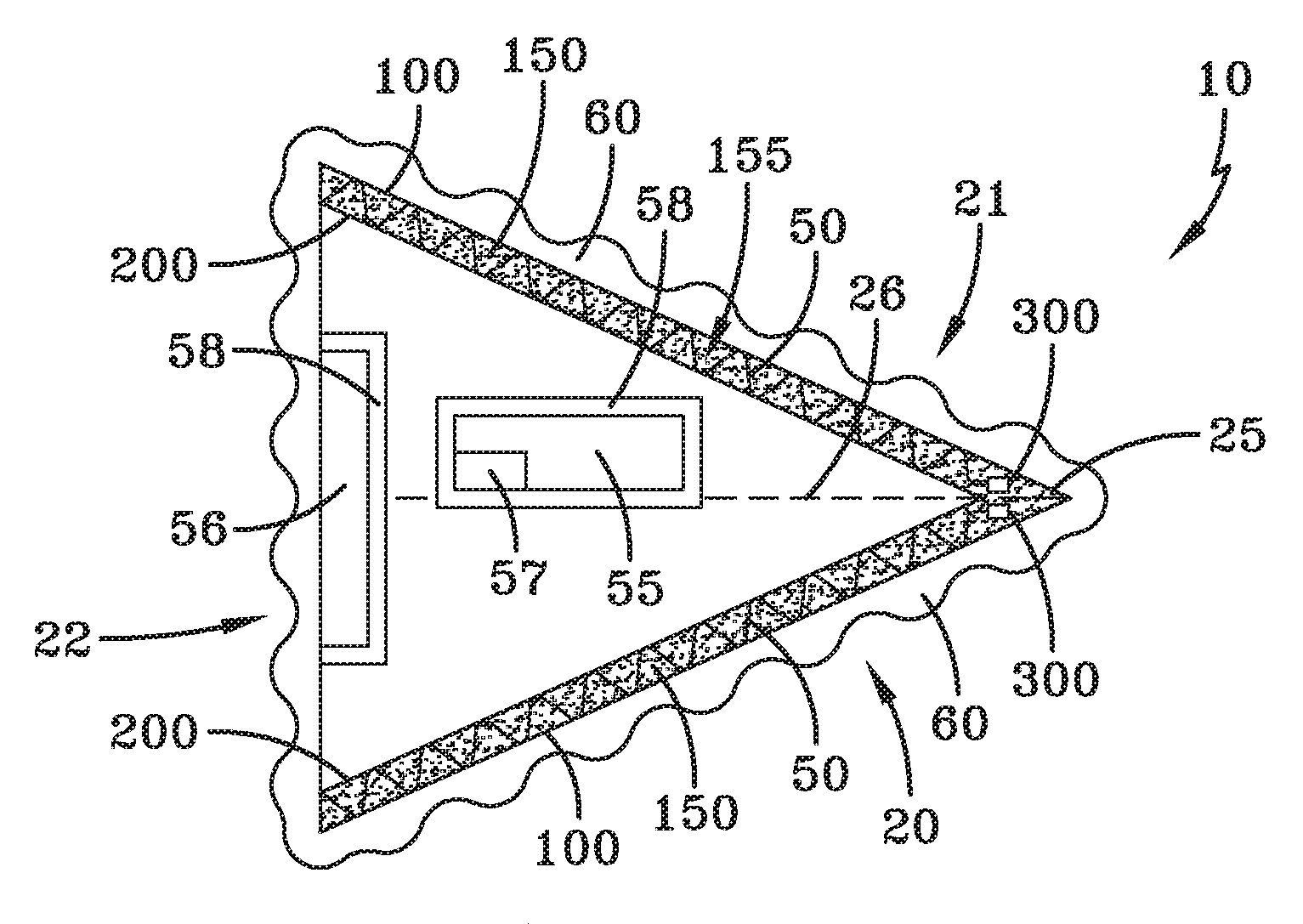
Drawing from Pais's patent application for a "craft using an inertial mass reduction device"

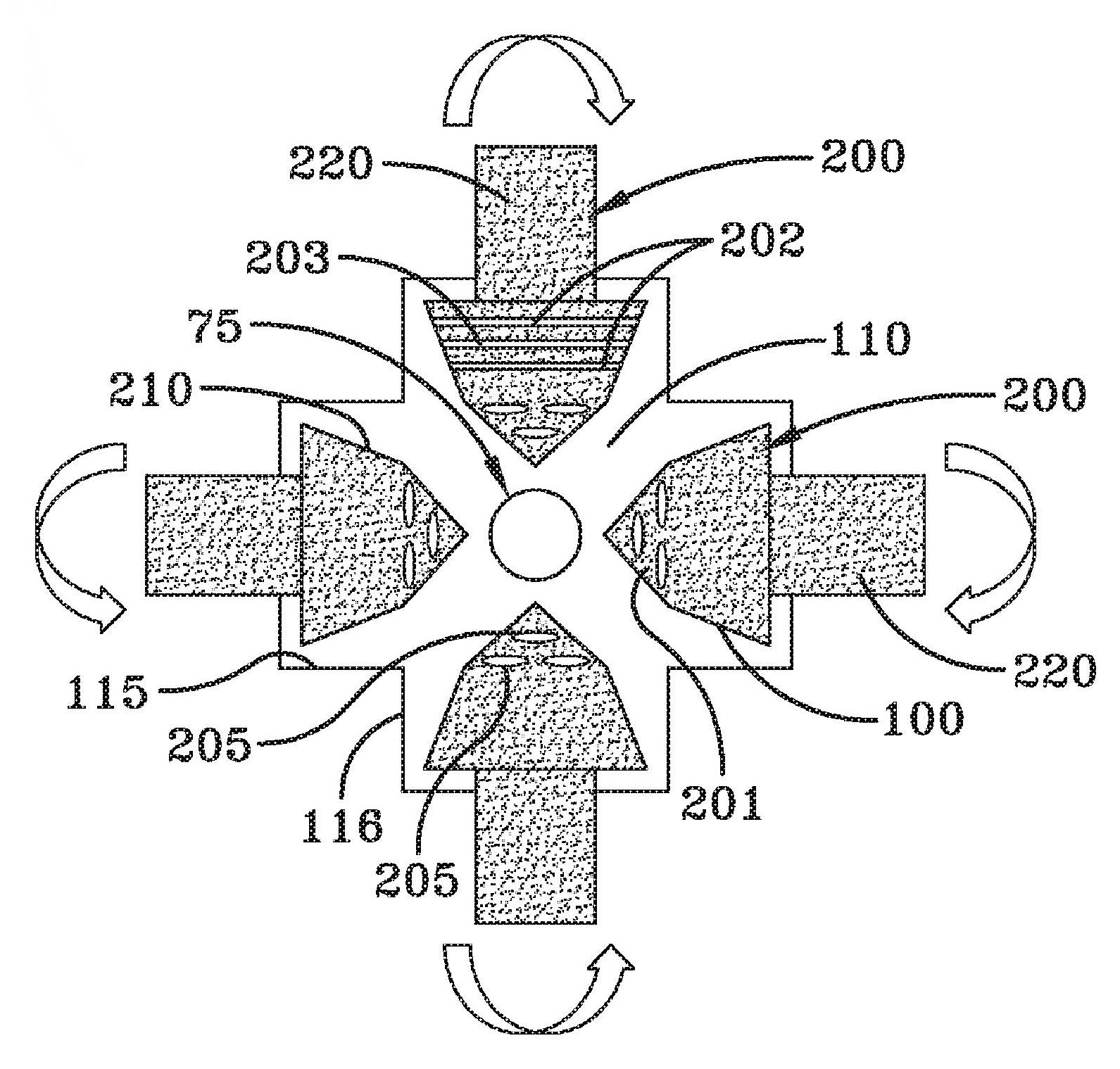
Drawing from Pais's patent application for a "plasma compression fusion device"

Beginning in 2015, Pais filed a series of patent applications on behalf of the U.S. Navy that attracted significant media attention. These patents, often referred to collectively as the "UFO patents," describe technologies that would, if feasible, represent dramatic advances beyond the current state of physics and engineering. He reported that he began in 2015 to publish his patents "after rejections from academic publishing". Pais stated in an interview that he accepted no royalties for the Navy patents and said he had filed them out of "pure patriotic duty." He told The Times that a U.S. Navy invention evaluation board approved all five of his patent filings, which he described as unprecedented for such a controversial subject.

No working prototype of any of the patented inventions was ever developed.

Pais's patent applications include:

- Electromagnetic field generator (filed 2015, granted November 20, 2018): A device to generate high-energy electromagnetic fields, with a principal stated application of deflecting asteroids on collision courses with Earth. The patent is assigned to the United States Secretary of the Navy.
- Craft using an inertial mass reduction device (filed 2016, granted December 4, 2018): A patent describing a conical "hybrid aerospace/undersea craft" that could purportedly "engineer the fabric of our reality at the most fundamental level" by utilizing an inertial mass reduction device. The patent was initially rejected, but was granted after James Sheehy, the Naval Aviation Enterprise's chief technology officer, wrote to the United States Patent and Trademark Office asserting that the invention was operable and warning that the Chinese military were developing similar technology. This patent expired on January 9, 2023, due to non-payment of maintenance fees.
- Piezoelectricity-induced room temperature superconductor (filed 2017, published February 21, 2019): A device purportedly capable of achieving superconductivity at room temperature, which would enable "the transmission of electrical power with no losses." The Institution of Engineering and Technology noted that no evidence was presented to demonstrate that the device worked, and that the highest-temperature superconductors achieved at that time operated at approximately −70 °C (−94 °F). The claim was also covered by Phys.org. The superconductor patent application led to appeals by the U.S. Navy and Pais, after being initially rejected by the U.S. Patent Office.
- High-frequency gravitational wave generator (filed 2017, granted June 18, 2019): A device that could purportedly be used "for advanced propulsion, asteroid disruption and/or deflection, and communications through solid objects."
- Plasma compression fusion device (filed 2018, published September 26, 2019): A compact nuclear fusion reactor described as capable of producing power in the gigawatt to terawatt range. Popular Mechanics described it as a "compact nuclear fusion reactor" whose "designs seemingly stretch the limits of science." The concept was also described in a peer-reviewed paper published in IEEE Transactions on Plasma Science in 2019. The patent application was ultimately abandoned.

== The "Pais Effect" and Navy testing ==
Central to all of Pais's inventions is a theoretical concept he calls the "Pais Effect," which he describes as the generation of extremely high electromagnetic energy fluxes through the controlled motion of electrically charged matter subjected to accelerated vibration and/or accelerated spin. Pais claims that this effect can interact with the quantum vacuum energy state to produce phenomena such as inertial mass reduction and room-temperature superconductivity.

NAWCAD conducted experiments to test the feasibility of the Pais Effect under a Naval Innovative Science and Engineering – Basic & Applied Research (NISE-BAR) program titled "The High Energy Electromagnetic Field Generator (HEEMFG)." According to Timothy Boulay, NAWCAD's Communications Director, testing occurred from October 2016 to September 2019 at a total cost of $508,000, with the vast majority of expenditure going to personnel salaries. Pais said those experiments had not yet produced the 1 Coulomb charge he considered necessary for the Pais Effect to work. In a quoted email, Pais described the "Pais Effect" as enabling what he called "Macroscopic Quantum Coherence," using this as part of his explanation for the broader claims in his patent-related work. At the conclusion of the testing period, NAWCAD determined that the "Pais Effect" could not be demonstrated, and stated that no further research was conducted.

However, The War Zone reported in 2019 that according to U.S. Navy records from 2018, the military had called the HEEMFG designed by Pais was "operable", and a "formative invention in its incipient stage(s)." Internal documents obtained through Freedom of Information Act requests by The Drive revealed that the project had been considered to have "National Security importance" within NAWCAD, and that research notes referenced a "Spacetime Modification Weapon" that could theoretically dwarf the power of a hydrogen bomb. NAWCAD stated the HEEMFG project did not transition to any other government or civilian organization. In the 2025 Times interview, Pais said he still sought funding to validate the concept and argued that doing so would require more personnel, laboratory time, and longer development timelines.

=== Scientific reception ===
The patents have been met with widespread skepticism from the physics community. The Drive reported that every physicist its journalists consulted over a two-year period asserted that the "Pais Effect" had no scientific basis in reality and that the patent language was filled with pseudoscientific jargon. Despite this, Pais maintained confidence in his work. In a November 2019 email to The Drive, he stated that his work "culminates in the enablement of the Pais Effect" and that "as far as the doubting SMEs (Subject Matter Experts) are concerned, my work shall be proven correct one fine day." In comments quoted by Vice, Pais argued that publication of his compact fusion reactor paper in IEEE Transactions on Plasma Science supported the importance and credibility of his underlying concepts.

Forbes contributor Ariel Cohen, writing about the patents in 2021, outlined several possible explanations: that the technologies could be genuine breakthroughs, that they could be disinformation intended to send adversaries like China on a "wild goose chase" (analogous to Reagan's "Star Wars" initiative), or that they could be related to other classified programs. Pais said his paper The Plasma Compression Fusion Device had been cited in at least four Chinese scientific papers published between 2021 and 2024, and presented this as evidence of Chinese interest in his ideas. Philosopher Bernardo Kastrup, writing in The Debrief, argued from an intellectual property perspective that legitimate defense technologies would be protected through industrial secrecy rather than public patents, and concluded that the patents were unlikely to have significant defense value. In the 2025 interview summarized by Interesting Engineering, Pais rejected suggestions that his patents were disinformation, saying they were "not a bluff" and asserting that the underlying physics was correct.

The Defence Connect and TechXplore also covered the fusion reactor patent, noting both its revolutionary potential and the lack of evidence that the device was operable.

Several of Pais's patents, including the electromagnetic field generator and the high-frequency gravitational wave generator, have since expired due to non-payment of maintenance fees, and the plasma compression fusion device patent application was abandoned, suggesting that neither Pais nor the Navy is actively pursuing these technologies through the patent system. According to The Times, "mainstream publications still refuse to publish him".

== Selected publications ==
=== Peer-reviewed papers ===
- Pais, Salvatore Cezar (September 1, 1991). "The Induced Thrust Effect; A Propulsion Method". SAE Technical Papers. SAE Technical Paper Series. 1 (912234). doi:10.4271/912234. ISSN 0148-7191.
- Pais, Salvatore Cezar (2015). "Conditional possibility of spacecraft propulsion at superluminal speeds". International Journal of Space Science and Engineering. 3 (1): 89–92. Bibcode:2015IJSSE...3...89P. doi:10.1504/IJSPACESE.2015.069339.
- Pais, Salvatore Cezar (2015). "The high energy electromagnetic field generator". International Journal of Space Science and Engineering. 3 (4): 312–317. Bibcode:2015IJSSE...3..312P. doi:10.1504/IJSPACESE.2015.075910.
- Pais, Salvatore Cezar (September 19, 2017). "High Frequency Gravitational Waves – Induced Propulsion". SAE Technical Papers. SAE Technical Paper Series. 1 (2017-01-2040). doi:10.4271/2017-01-2040. ISSN 0148-7191.
- A Hybrid craft using an inertial mass modification device. AIAA Space Forum 2017-5343. American Institute of Aeronautics and Astronautics. 2017. doi:10.2514/6.2017-5343.
- Room Temperature Superconducting System for use on a Hybrid Aerospace-Undersea Craft. AIAA SciTech Forum 2019-0869. American Institute of Aeronautics and Astronautics. 2019. doi:10.2514/6.2019-0869.
- Pais, Salvatore Cezar (2019). "The Plasma Compression Fusion Device—Enabling Nuclear Fusion Ignition". IEEE Transactions on Plasma Science. 47 (11): 5119–5124. Bibcode:2019ITPS...47.5119P. doi:10.1109/TPS.2019.2942997.

=== Patent literature ===
- US 10135366B2, Salvatore Cezar Pais, "Electromagnetic field generator and method to generate an electromagnetic field", issued November 20, 2018
- US 10144532B2, Salvatore Cezar Pais, "Craft using an inertial mass reduction device", issued December 4, 2018
- US 10322827B2, Salvatore Cezar Pais, "High frequency gravitational wave generator", issued June 18, 2019
- US 20190058105A1, Salvatore Cezar Pais, "Piezoelectricity-induced Room Temperature Superconductor", published February 21, 2019
- US 20190295733A1, Salvatore Cezar Pais, "Plasma Compression Fusion Device", published September 26, 2019

== Personal life ==
Pais lives in California. He described himself as religious. Pais was noted for having virtually no web presence. The Times reported that Pais stated in his capacity as a private individual that he believes extraterrestrial life exists, may possess technologies similar to his inventions, and are a form of "superintelligence" that "considers the human race 'an experiment'."

== See also ==
- LK-99 – Proposed superconducting material
- Strategic Defense Initiative – U.S. military defense program (1984–1993)
