= Catherine Ribeiro =

French singer (1941–2024)

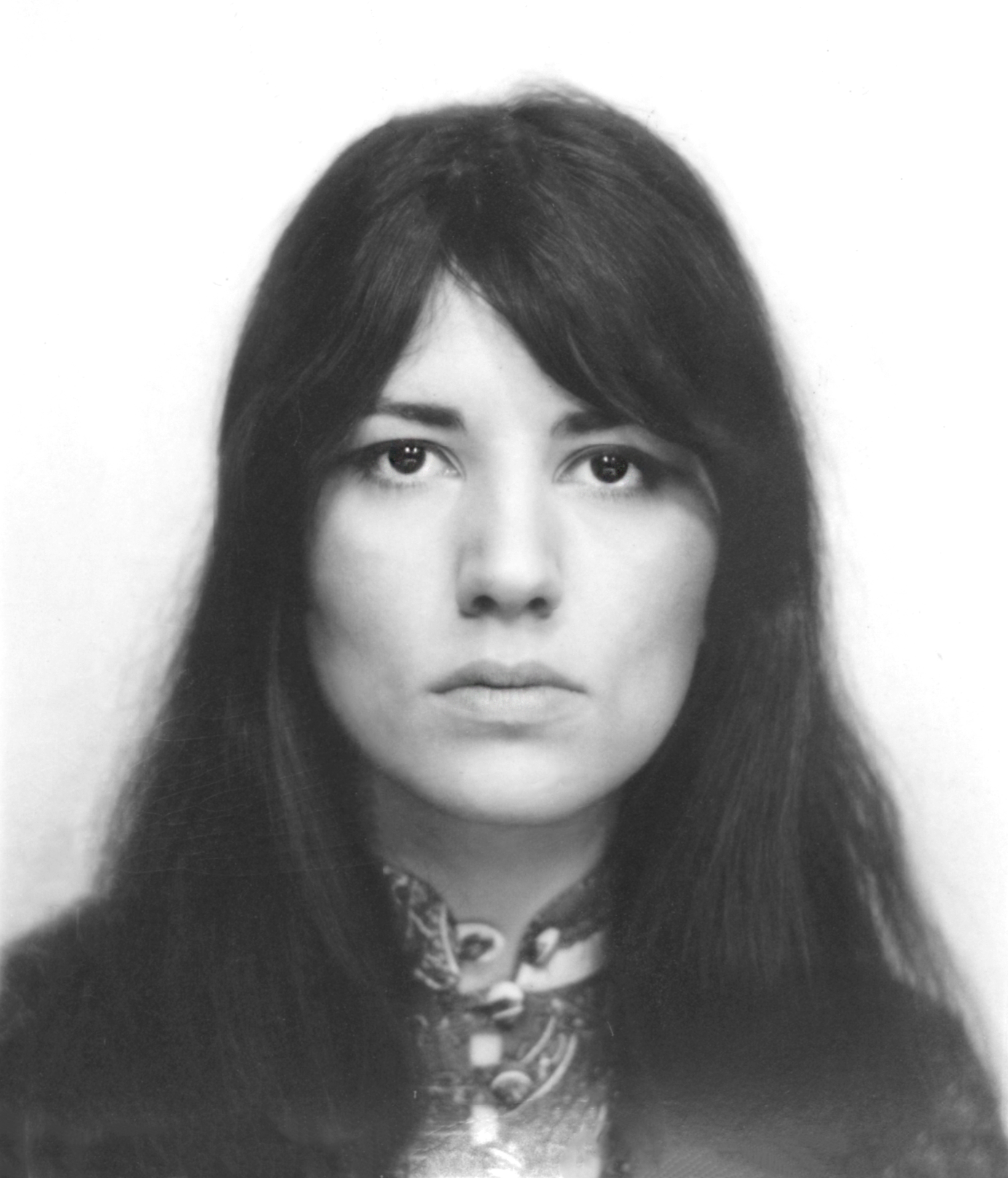
- Ribeiro in 1970

Background information
- Born: 22 September 1941; Lyon, France
- Died: 23 August 2024 (aged 82) Martigues, France
- Genres: Folk; rock; chanson; progressive rock
- Occupations: Singer; songwriter; actress
- Instrument: Vocals
- Years active: 1963–2024
- Labels: Philips; Mercury; Musea
- Formerly of: Catherine Ribeiro + Alpes
- Website: catherine-ribeiro-alpes.com

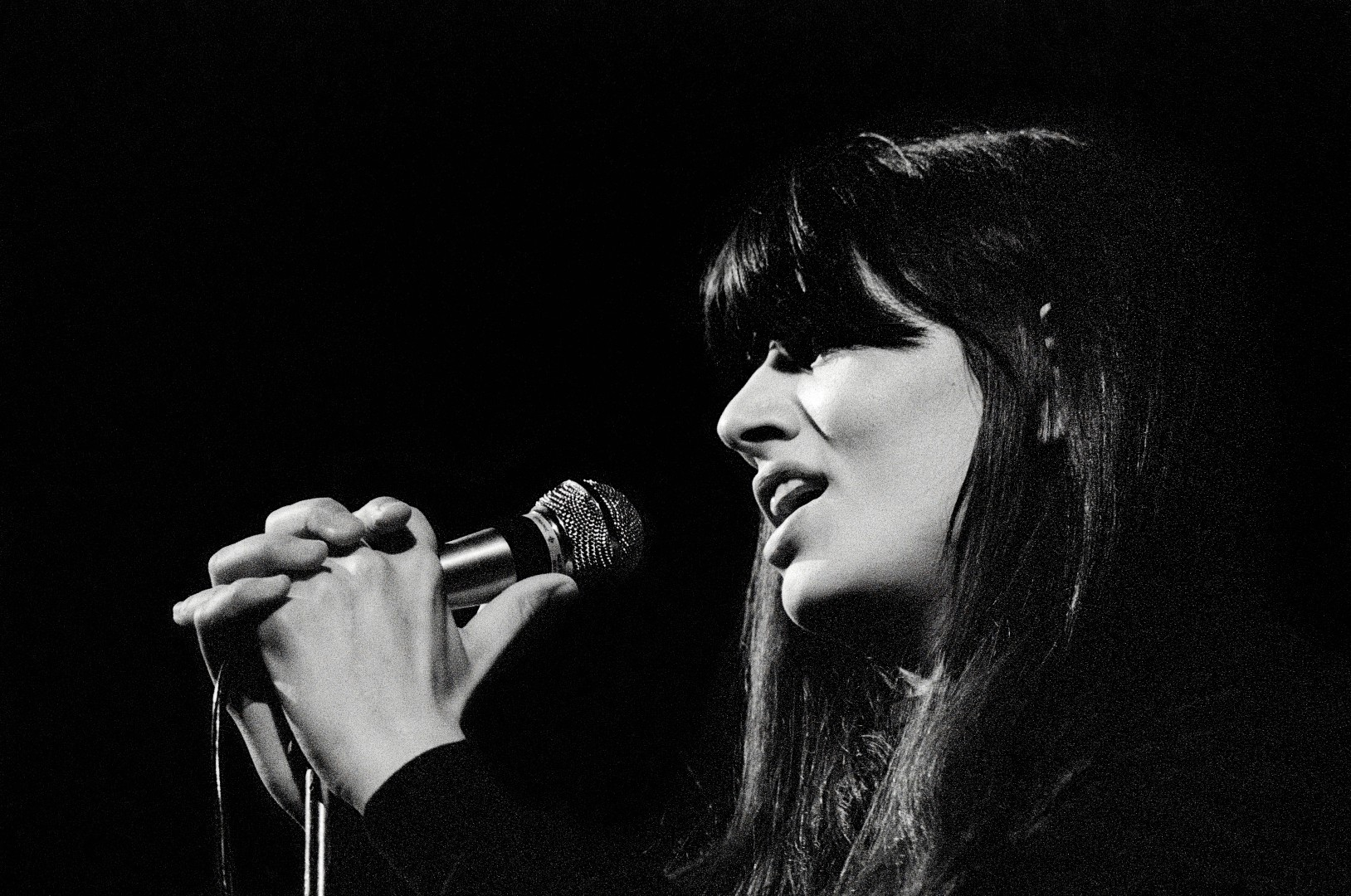
Ribeiro in Bordeaux in 1972

Catherine Ribeiro (French pronunciation: [katʁin ʁibeʁo]; 22 September 1941 – 23 August 2024) was a French singer. Ribeiro was an experimental folk and avant-garde performer whose work has attained a cult following. With her band Catherine Ribeiro + Alpes, she released several albums in the late 1960s and early 1970s, including Catherine Ribeiro & 2Bis in 1969, No.2 in 1970, and Paix in 1972. From the late 1970s, Ribeiro also released music as a solo artist. Public figures who have expressed appreciation for her work include the musicians Kim Gordon and Julian Cope, as well as the French mathematician Cédric Villani. Ribeiro died on 23 August 2024, at the age of 82.

== Legal issues ==
Jacqueries was released November 29, 1978 and featured 12 songs by the poet Jacques Prévert. The title referred to the French peasant uprising in the 14th Century. In January 1979, Prévert's widow, Janine, and the publisher Gallimard, requested that the title be withdrawn from sale, deploring the use of the word "Jacqueries" as a collective title as they felt it "made use of the poet's name abusively". The record label, Philips Phonogram, agreed to withdraw the title. Ribeiro felt her rights were violated and suggested Philips add an explanatory note to new record sleeves to note that the original title had been removed at the request of Prévert's widow and Gallimard. Philips felt this was discorteous to Prévert and refused. Following Philip's decision, Ribiero went on hunger strike on May 7, 1979 at a Paris theatre. She was visited by supporters, including François Mitterrand, secretary of the French Socialist Party, and Prévert's daughter, Michel Prévert-Bachelot. On May 16, Philips eventually agreed to add the explanatory note and Ribeiro ended her hunger strike after 10 days. Prévert's widow eventually relented in allowing the original title with a note on the album that the title was explicitly chosen by Ribeiro. The album was reissued on CD under the name "Catherine Ribeiro chante Jacques Prévert".

== Discography ==
=== Studio albums ===
With Alpes

- Catherine Ribeiro + 2bis (1969)
- N°2 (also known as Catherine Ribeiro + Alpes) (1970)
- Âme debout (1971)
- Paix (1972)
- Le Rat débile et l'Homme des champs (1974)
- Libertés ? (1975)
- Le Temps de l'autre (1977)
- Passions (1979)
- La Déboussole (1980)

Solo

- Le Blues de Piaf (1977)
- Jacqueries (1978) (Note: Jacqueries was reissued on CD under the name "Catherine Ribeiro chante Jacques Prévert", following legal difficulties with the beneficiaries of Jacques Prévert.)
- Soleil dans l'ombre (1982)
- Percuphonante... (1986)
- 1989... déjà ! (1988)
- Fenêtre ardente (1993)

=== Live albums ===
- L'amour aux nus (1992)
- Vivre libre (1995) (Note: There is also a DVD. Vivre Libre, Théâtre des Bouffes du Nord, 31 January – 12 February 1995)
- Chansons de légende (1997)
- Live au Théâtre Toursky (2002)
- Catherine Ribeiro chante Ribeiro Alpes (2006)
- Catherine Ribeiro chante Ribeiro Alpes Live intégral (2007)

=== EPs ===
- Dieu me pardonne (1965)
- Le Chasseur (1966)
- La nuit et le vent (1966)
- Lorsque le bateau viendra (1967)
- Vivre libre (promotional CD) (1995)

=== Singles ===
- "Aria" / "La solitude" (1969; Festival 878), with 2bis
- "Sœur de race" / "Voyage 1" (1969; Festival SPX 79), with 2bis
- "Thème en bref" / "Silen Voy Kathy" (1970; Festival SPX 128), recorded live at the Port Leucate festival in July 1970 with Alpes
- "Jusqu'à ce que la force de t'aimer me manque" / "Roc Alpin" (1972; Philips 6837 102), with Alpes
- "La petite fille aux fraises" / "L'ère de la putréfaction" (1974; Philips 6837 208), with Alpes
- "Un regard clair (obscur)" / "L'ère de la putréfaction" (1974; Philips 6837 223), with Alpes
- "Une infinie tendresse" / "Prélude médiéval" (1975; Festival 6837 288), with Alpes
- "Les Partisans" / "La Varsovienne" (1976; Philips 6042 243), with the Choirs of the Soviet Army
- "Dernière sortie avant Roissy" / "Le bonheur tout de suite" (1977; Philips (6172 036), soundtrack from the film by Bernard Paul
- "Hymne à l'amour" / "Les amants d'un jour" (1977; Philips 6837 442)
- "Chanson de la ville à prendre" / "Aria populaire" (1979; Fontana 6172 763), soundtrack from the film by Patrick Brunie
- "Amour petite flamme" / "Dans le creux de ta nuit" (1982; Philips 6010 618)
- "Jour de fête" / "Carrefour de la solitude" (1982; Philips 841 267-7)
- "Guet-apens" / "Sans amarres" (1982; Philips 6010.515)
- "Plus de reproches" / "Insoumission mondiale" (1986; Phonogram)
- "Elles" / "Soleil" (1986; Ioana Melodies 020)
- "Stress et strass" / "Le Cerf-volant" (1993; Mantra)

== Filmography ==
Year	Title	Credit(s)	Role	Notes
1963	Les Carabiniers	Actress	Cleopatra	
1964	Buffalo Bill, l'eroe del far west	Actress	Moonbeam	
1966	We Are All Naked	Actress	La nièce	
1968	Happening	Actress	Nicky	
1975	Ne	Actress		
1976	Les écrans déchirés	Actress		Short
