= Buffalo Bill, Hero of the Far West =

1965 film by Mario Costa

Buffalo Bill, l'eroe del far west
- Directed by: Mario Costa as John W. Fordson
- Written by: Louis Agotay, Pierre Corty, Nino Stresa, Sigfrido Tomba, Ernesto Gastaldi
- Produced by: Solly V. Bianco
- Starring: Gordon Scott
- Cinematography: Massimo Dallamano as Jack Dalmas Technicolor, Techniscope
- Edited by: Jolanda Benvenuti
- Music by: Carlo Rustichelli
- Distributed by: Miramax Films
- Release date: 1964
- Running time: 100 minutes
- Country: Italy
- Language: Italian

Buffalo Bill, Hero of the Far West (Buffalo Bill, l'eroe del far west) is a 1964 Italian Spaghetti Western directed by Mario Costa.

== Story ==
Buffalo Bill is sent west by President Ulysses S. Grant to settle an Indian uprising started by Yellow Hand and supported by gun smugglers.

== Cast ==
- Gordon Scott as Colonel William "Buffalo Bill" Cody
- Mario Brega as Donaldson
- Jan Hendriks as Monroe
- Catherine Ribeiro as Rayon-de-Lune/Moonbeam
- Piero Lulli as Red
- Mirko Ellis as Yellow Hand
- Hans von Borsody as Captain Hunter
- Roldano Lupi as Colonel Peterson
- Ingeborg Schöner as Mary Peterson
- Feodor Chaliapin, Jr. as Chief White Fox
- Ugo Sasso as Snack
- Luigi Tosi as barman
- Franco Fantasia as George, a poker player
- Andrea Scotti as poker player
