= Linda Young (scientist) =

American scientist specialized in X-ray Science

- Education: University of California, Berkeley (PhD), MIT (S.B.)
- Employer: Argonne National Laboratory
- Organization: University of Chicago
- Known for: X-ray science
- Awards: Helmholtz International Fellow (2017)
- Website: https://www.anl.gov/profile/linda-young

Linda Young is a distinguished fellow at the U.S. Department of Energy's (DOE) Argonne National Laboratory and a professor at the University of Chicago's Department of Physics and James Franck Institute. Young is also the former director of Argonne's X-ray Science Division.

Young is an expert in the field of X-ray science. For her contributions to the field, The Helmholtz Association—Germany's largest scientific organization—awarded Young the Helmholtz International Fellow Award in 2017. Young is also a fellow of the American Physical Society and has served on multiple scientific advisory boards. She currently chairs the scientific advisory committee for the Photon Science Directorate of the Paul Scherrer Institute and has previously served on the European XFEL, Helmholtz-Zentrum Berlin, and DESY Scientific Councils.

== Early life and education ==
Young earned her Ph.D. from the University of California, Berkeley in 1981, and her bachelor of science degree from Massachusetts Institute of Technology in 1976. After completing her post-doctoral studies at the University of Chicago, Young joined Argonne's Physics Division. From 1994 until 2010, Young led the AMO Physics Group within the laboratory, and from 2009 until 2015, she directed Argonne's X-ray Science Division.

== Major research contributions ==
=== Ultra-Intense X-ray interactions ===
Young has worked extensively on understanding x-ray atom interactions in the ultrahigh intensity regime provided by x-ray free-electron lasers. She led the first scientific experiment at the Linac Coherent Light Source—the world's first hard x-ray free electron laser—and has co-authored multiple studies that have established the dominant multiphoton and nonlinear x-ray interaction mechanisms with atoms. Young also investigates the electron dynamics driven by X-ray free-electron lasers (XFEL); understanding transient electron configurations within XFEL-irradiated samples is critical to single-shot x-ray imaging applications.

=== X-ray Photoionization & Inner Shell processes ===
Young has conducted research to understand and control x-ray photoionization and inner-shell processes, including non-dipole photoionization Compton Double ionization Rayleigh vs Compton Scattering double K-photoionization x-ray probes of optical strong-field processes optical control of X-ray absorption via electromagnetically induced transparency (EIT)-like phenomena and X-ray pump/X-ray probe studies of inner-shell dynamics.

=== Ultrastable, High-Repetition Rate Pump-Probe X-ray Studies ===
Young has worked with Argonne's AMO Physics Group and other collaborators on developing an ultrastable, high-repetition rate, widely tunable, polarized picosecond X-ray pump/probe capabilities. These developments will enable researchers to track laser-controlled molecular dynamics in condensed phases with specificity.

=== Atom Trap Trace Analysis (ATTA) ===
Young was part of the research team that developed the Atom Trap Trace Analysis (ATTA) methodology for counting atoms of rare isotopes whose isotopic abundances are less than one part in a trillion. ATTA is a tool that extends radiocarbon dating from 5000 yr to 200 kyr, operating on long-lived isotopes where radioactive decay counting is inefficient. ATTA has been used with 81Kr to date the groundwater of ancient aquifers.

== Awards, honors, and membership ==
- Awarded Helmholtz International Fellowship, 2017
- Invited speaker at the Nobel Symposium on Free Electron Laser Research, 2015
- Received a Distinguished Performance Award from the University of Chicago, 2007
- Named a Fellow of the American Physical Society, 2000
- Elected Chair of the American Physical Society's Division of Molecular and Optical Physics., 2011
