= Simon Ostrach =

American mathematician and engineer (1923-2017)

- Born: December 26, 1923; Providence, Rhode Island, U.S.
- Died: October 2, 2017 (aged 93); Pepper Pike, Ohio, U.S.
- Education: Rhode Island State College (BS, MS); Brown University (MS, PhD)
- Scientific career
- Fields: Buoyancy-driven flow Microgravity
- Workplaces: FAMU-FSU College of Engineering; Case Western Reserve University; NASA
- Doctoral advisors: William Prager; George F. Carrier
- Doctoral students: Salvatore Cezar Pais

Simon Ostrach (December 26, 1923 – October 2, 2017) was an American applied mathematician and mechanical engineer. He was a pioneer in the fields of buoyancy-driven flows and microgravity science.

== Early life and education ==
Ostrach was born and raised in Providence, Rhode Island. He was a member of the class of 1938 at Hope High School (Rhode Island) in Providence, then entered Rhode Island State College (now University of Rhode Island), where he earned a Bachelor of Science and Master of Science in Engineering, followed by an additional Master of Science and a PhD from Brown University, both in Applied Mathematics.

== Career ==
He was a Distinguished Professor at Florida State University, where he was affiliated with the Florida A&M University – Florida State University College of Engineering. He was also the Wilbert J. Austin Distinguished Professor Emeritus of Engineering at Case Western Reserve University in Cleveland, Ohio. He was honored by the American Society of Mechanical Engineers in 1987 with the Robert Henry Thurston Lecture Award, delivering an award lecture entitled "Transport Phenomena in Industrial Processes." He was honored by NASA in 1998 as one of its "12 Superstars of Modern Aeronautics" and was a member of the National Academy of Engineering and the American Academy of Arts & Sciences. He was inducted into the NASA Glenn Research Center Hall of Fame in 2015. Dr. Ostrach's research was recognized in a NASA publication documenting the history of the NASA Glenn Research Center from 1941 to 2016.

== Personal life ==
Ostrach was married twice and had five children. One of his sons, Louis Ostrach, died in 2017.

He died at the age of 93 in Pepper Pike, Ohio.
