= El País (disambiguation) =

El País is a national daily newspaper in Spain.

El País (Spanish for "The Country") may also refer to:

- El País (Cali), a newspaper in Colombia
- El País (Tarija), a newspaper in Bolivia
- El País (Uruguay), a newspaper in Uruguay

== See also ==
- País, a leftist political party in Chile
