= Atomic trap trace analysis =

Trace analysis method

Atom Trap Trace Analysis (ATTA) is an extremely sensitive trace analysis method developed by Argonne National Lab (ANL). ATTA is used on long-lived, stable radioisotopes such as ^{81}Kr, ^{85}Kr, and ^{39}Ar. By using a laser that is locked to an atomic transition, a CCD or PMT will detect the laser induced fluorescence to allow highly selective, parts-per-trillion to parts-per-quadrillion concentration measurement with single atom detection. This method is useful for atomic transport processes, such as in the atmosphere, geological dating, as well as noble gas purification.

ATTA measurements of noble gas elements are possible only if the atoms are excited to a metastable state prior to detection. The main difficulty to accomplishing this is the large energy gap (10-20 eV) between the ground and excited state. The current solution is to use an RF discharge, which is a brute force technique that is inefficient and leads to complications such contamination of the walls from ion sputtering and high gas density. A new scheme for generating a metastable beam which can achieve a cleaner, slower, and preferably more intense source would provide a substantial advance to ATTA technology. All-optical techniques have been considered, but have not yet been able to compete with the discharge source. A new technique for generation of metastable krypton involves the use of a two photon transition driven by a pulsed, far-UV laser to populate the excited state which decays to the metastable state with high probability.

== Sources ==
- "Laboratory for Radio-Krypton Dating". Argonne National Lab.
- "Trapping and Probing Rare Isotopes". Argonne National Lab.
