= Elísio Pais =

Portuguese footballer

Personal information
- Full name: Elísio Miguel Oliveira Pais
- Date of birth: 22 February 1998 (age 28)
- Place of birth: Viseu, Portugal
- Height: 1.84 m (6 ft 0 in)
- Position: Goalkeeper

Team information
- Current team: Castro Daire

Youth career
- 2006–2008: Ranhados
- 2008–2010: CB Viseu
- 2010–2012: Repesenses
- 2012–2013: Académica
- 2013–2016: Académico Viseu

Senior career*
Years	Team	Apps	(Gls)
2016–2021	Académico Viseu	2	(0)
2021–	Castro Daire	2	(0)
- * Club domestic league appearances and goals as of 19 September 2021

Elísio Miguel Oliveira Pais (born 22 February 1998) is a Portuguese professional footballer who plays for Castro Daire as a goalkeeper.

== Football career ==
On 6 August 2016, Pais made his professional debut with Académico Viseu in a 2016–17 LigaPro match against Vizela.
