= Fábio Pais =

Portuguese footballer (born 1996)

Personal information
- Full name: Fábio André Costa Pais
- Date of birth: 28 May 1996 (age 30)
- Place of birth: Covilhã, Portugal
- Height: 1.75 m (5 ft 9 in)
- Position: Left-back

Team information
- Current team: Vidago

Youth career
- 2005–2015: Sporting Covilhã

Senior career*
Years	Team	Apps	(Gls)
2014–2016	Sporting Covilhã	1	(0)
2015	Sporting Covilhã B	6	(1)
2016–2016	→ Tourizense (loan)	19	(1)
2016–2017	Benfica e Castelo Branco	11	(0)
2017–2018	Montalegre	12	(0)
2018–2019	GD Vilar De Perdizes	25	(5)
2019–2020	Bragança	6	(0)
2020–	Vidago	8	(1)
- * Club domestic league appearances and goals as of 1 August 2021

Fábio André Costa Pais (born 28 May 1996) is a Portuguese footballer who plays for Vidago as a left-back.

== Early life ==
On 28 May 1996, Pais was born as Fábio André Costa Paia in Covilhã, Portugal.

== Career ==
On 25 February 2015, Pais made his professional debut with Sporting Covilhã in a 2014–15 Segunda Liga match against Vitória Guimarães B.
