= Paix =

1972 studio album by Catherine Ribeiro + Alpes

- Cover by Jean-Pierre Leloir

Studio album by Catherine Ribeiro + Alpes
- Released: 1972
- Genre: Progressive folk; progressive rock; psychedelic folk; psychedelic rock; space rock; avant-garde
- Length: 46:36
- Language: French
- Label: Philips

Catherine Ribeiro + Alpes chronology
Âme debout (1971)	Paix (1972)	Le Rat debile et l'homme des champs (1974)

Paix (Note: French: [pɛ] (in English, approximately pronounced "peh"); lit. 'Peace'.) is the fourth studio album by the French singer Catherine Ribeiro and her third with the band Alpes. It was originally released in 1972 by Philips Records.

The album integrates the group's original folk-oriented sound within the progressive style of their preceding records, with complex instrumentation, longform compositions, and psychedelic soundscapes. It has been described as containing Ribeiro's most experimental work and is generally considered by critics to be the best album in Alpes' catalogue.

Paix was met with relative critical and commercial success upon release. As with Ribeiro's other albums, it became recognized as a cult album due to Ribeiro's distinct voice and lyrics, as well as its relative scarcity. In 2018, the album was issued for the first time in the United States, where it was well-received by critics and lauded among followers of niche folk scenes.

== Background ==
Catherine Ribeiro's second album with Alpes, Âme debout (1971), showed her music "grow[ing] more disciplined and more boundless", according to Pitchfork's Sam Sodomsky. The album still featured folk ballads (such as "Diborowska" and "Dingue") as their previous records had, but it also showcased the group's evolving style of progressive and experimental music, particularly with the series of tracks entitled "Alpes" at the center of the album. Âme debout was also the first Alpes album recorded after the inclusion of bassist Jean-Sebastian Lemoine's brother, organist Patrice Lemoine (later a member of Gong). Throughout 1972, Ribeiro, who had been listening to very little music in order to focus on her own writing, spent many hours rehearsing with Alpes in the French countryside preparing the material for what would become Paix.

== Music ==
=== Style ===
Eclectic in style, Paix has been described as folk, rock, psychedelia, progressive music, experimental music, and avant-garde music. Nonetheless, the album "remains hard to pin down" in genre terms, according to Impose magazine writer Trent Masterson, because "[i]t is extremely progressive in all aspects of the word"; for that reason, it "does not neatly fit into any specific genre nor is it easily comparable to any other album." In terms of the band's own trajectory, Masterson felt that the album was an amalgam of the band's early sound—a fusion of "rural psychedelia" and progressive rock—combined with "some hints of burgeoning genres, such as space rock, chamber pop and even punk (the 'punk' aspect being Ribeiro's unforgiving vocal deliveries in part)." Seth Wimpfheimer, writing for Head Heritage, observed that "[i]nstead of partitioning the folk ballads away from the progressive instrumentals to hang separately as leaden entities" as they did on Âme debout, the music on Paix was "far more integrated" than the previous album. French pop magazine Vapeur Mauve described the musical style of Paix as "ambiguous ... soft but aggressive, on airs from progressive folk to ethno-freak tendencies."

"Un jour... la mort" middle section intro
Brian Coney of The Quietus described Moullet's homemade cosmophone and percuphone as weaving "droning, unearthly prog textures" around Ribeiro's vocals.

As with Alpes' previous works, Paix makes prominent use of the cosmophone and the percuphone, instruments invented by bandleader Patrice Moullet. The cosmophone is a 24-string instrument, resembling a lyre, that can be played with either picking or bowing, while the percuphone is a percussion instrument that produces rhythms by repeatedly striking a bass string using a small motor. Jean-Sebastien Lemoine was made operator of the percuphone on Paix, forming the one-man rhythm section that would help define the band's unique dynamics on the album.

=== Songs ===
==== "Roc alpin" ====
"Roc alpin" is an upbeat instrumental with non-lexical vocals from Ribeiro. Moullet's cosmophone backs Patrice Lemoine's organ, except during the bridge when it switches to playing a lead line. It is the only track to feature Michel Santangelli on drums, with the percuphone providing the rest of the album's percussion. The song was also released as a single.

==== "Jusqu'à ce que la force de t'aimer me manque" ====
"Jusqu'à ce que la force de t'aimer me manque" is a love song that anticipates elements of dream pop, specifically its acoustic guitar riffing and its harmonization of Ribeiro's vocal lines with Patrice Lemoine's organ.

==== "Paix" ====
"Paix" begins with a slow fade in of a droning Farfisa organ part accompanied by a driving percuphone rhythm. Writer Jean-Marc Grosdemouge likened the song to Maurice Ravel's Boléro as another composition "branded by its rhythm." Moullet's cosmophone enters, after which a descending, hymnal theme is introduced and repeated throughout much of the song. The song's introduction also includes an organ solo performed by Patrice Lemoine which Wimpfheimer noted bears a resemblance to Mike Ratledge's coda on "Song for Insane Times" by Kevin Ayers. The intro persists for approximately five and a half minutes when Ribeiro's spoken word vocals suddenly enter. After a second organ solo from Lemoine, the opening theme returns and Ribeiro accompanies it wordlessly. The closing portion of the song "resembles doom metal in its descending bassline and Ribeiro’s spectral vocals." As the track approaches 16 minutes, the song ends with a crescendo.

==== "Un jour... la mort" ====
"Un jour... la mort" is about meeting a female personification of death. Described by Mojo as a requiem, the song was inspired by Ribeiro's attempted suicide in May 1968, after which she had to relearn how to speak, walk, and write. It is 25 minutes long and occupies the entire second side of the album; however, unlike the title track, it contains multiple sections. The song begins with another slow fade in of an organ, this time accompanied with soft notes from Moullet's cosmophone. This leads into the next section by a sudden rise of acoustic guitar strumming followed by more wordless vocals from Ribeiro, interluded with Patrice Lemoine's organ.

The middle section of "Un jour... la mort" begins with a rattling percuphone groove. Moullet joins in with his cosmophone, now playing it with a bow. This is followed by a lengthy instrumental passage featuring an organ solo and swirling layers of microtonal piano lines. The final section of the song is a coda, beginning with a solo acoustic guitar and ending with "jarring caws, thematic organ positions and patiently plonking bass" backing Ribeiro's vocals.

== Artwork and packaging ==
Paix's front cover, like nearly all of Alpes' albums, features the group outdoors in the Alpes-de-Haute-Provence region of Southern France. Ribeiro and Moullet are shown sitting in the foreground while the Lemoine brothers stand in the background on either side of a tree bearing the group's name and album title. The text is written in the Camellia typeface by Letraset, with the long band name using the font's narrow glyphs and the short album title using its wide forms. The cover photo was taken by French music photographer Jean-Pierre Leloir, while the album's gatefold artwork was anonymously credited to "X...".

As with all of Ribeiro's albums, Philips Records issued Paix with a sticker on the cover stating "Les textes de ces chansons n'engagent que leur auteur" (lit. 'The texts of these songs engage only their author'). Ribeiro resented the content disclaimer, saying, "It's terrible to have done this to me."

== Release and reception ==
Paix was released shortly after the band performed to 4,000 people at the Cathedral of St. Michael and St. Gudula in Brussels. The album achieved considerably more commercial success upon release than the group's previous albums; it sold 50,000 copies, five times as many as their debut Nº2 had sold.

=== Contemporary reviews ===
In an early 1973 issue of the French rock magazine Pop 2000, critic Alain Lemaire proclaimed Paix to be "a sensational album, further proof of the immense talent of Catherine + Alpes." In March, the magazine published its year-end readers' poll for 1972, which ranked Catherine Ribeiro as the tenth best female singer in the world for that year. In April, Belgian magazine Beurk named Paix their "LP of the month".

=== Cult following and retrospective appraisal ===
Professional ratings
Review scores
Source	Rating
AllMusic	4.5/5 stars
Mojo	4/5 stars
Pitchfork	8.5/10
Record Collector	4/5 stars
The Vinyl District	A

Among Ribeiro's other albums, Paix developed a cult following drawn to Ribeiro's distinctive vocal performance and her enigmatic lyrics. The album remained out of print for a long time; however, Sodomsky notes that the album's "legend" was "due in part to [its] scarcity."

In a review for AllMusic, Rolf Semprebon simply described Paix as "one of Catherine Ribeiro's more intense recordings." He noted the band's less folk-inclined, more space rock-leaning sound and cited "Paix" and "Un jour... la mort" as containing "some of Ribeiro's more gutsy and emotional singing (especially on 'Paix,' where at some places she is practically screaming)." He concludes by saying that her second album Nº2 is "just as good but almost impossible to track down, so Paix is probably the best place to start." Conversely, Joseph Neff of The Vinyl District observed that "Instead of faltering into repetitive stylistic patterns, Paix adjusts and integrates new elements, and pulls off a rarity; a third LP that betters it predecessors." He further remarked that Ribeiro's creativity on the album's longer tracks "underscores her stature as one of the underground’s finest vocalists." In April 2022, Spin magazine ranked Paix at number 31 on their list of "The 50 Best Albums of 1972". Mojo included the album in their list of "1972 Nuggets"; contributor Andrew Male described it as "the sound of coming European upheaval, pleases for love expressed in violence and anger".

Singer-songwriter Marissa Nadler has cited Paix as one of her biggest inspirations and described it as "an entrancing psychedelic journey and one hell of a vocal performance."

=== Reissues ===
Paix was first issued on CD in 1993 when it was licensed by Universal Music Group to the independent label Mantra. In 2015, Paix was included on a 9-CD box set of Ribeiro + Alpes' work issued by Mercury Records.

Fact magazine writer Mikey IQ Jones reviewed Âme debout and Paix upon their 2016 reissue, evaluating them as "masterpieces" and "cornerstones of international psychedelia, ably shifting between genres and song forms into a music that’s truly quite unlike anything else". He said that on Paix, Ribeiro and Moullet had "seemingly perfected their chemistry and distilled it into four spectral hymns which slowly evolve from basic psych-rock invocations into a sun-bleached beckoning of the heavens".

Along with the band's two previous albums, Nº2 and Âme debout, Paix was remastered and reissued by Anthology Recordings in the United States on 14 September 2018. The three LPs were released both individually and together as a deluxe silk-screened box set with a 56-page book featuring photographs from Ribeiro’s personal collection. The reissue marked the first time the albums were released in the US. In an interview with Vice, Ribeiro denounced the reissue, stating that, "I was happy [with the 2015 Alpes box set], that was enough for me. Now there is again a scam with Universal in the United States. This little box, Anthology Recordings, bought the rights to three of our records for $5.89 each! Universal didn't tell me, it's absolutely disgusting." Despite this sentiment from Ribeiro, the reissue was lauded by followers of "free-folk" and other niche folk scenes, helping to reinforce an already cult status. Music critic Richie Unterberger ranked Paix number 3 on his list of the "Top 25 Rock Reissues of 2018", behind the Beatles' self-titled double album and Liz Phair's Exile in Guyville. The album also received "best reissue" acclaim from Pitchfork, The A.V. Club, and Treble.

== Track listing ==
All lyrics are written by Catherine Ribeiro, except "Roc alpin" by Patrice Moullet; all music is composed by Patrice Moullet.

Side one

1. "Roc alpin" – 3:02
2. "Jusqu'à ce que la force de t'aimer me manque" – 3:01
3. "Paix" – 15:50

Side two

1. "Un jour... la mort" – 24:43

== Personnel ==
Credits adapted from the original LP's liner notes.

- Catherine Ribeiro (uncredited) – vocals

Alpes

- Patrice Moullet – cosmophone, acoustic guitar
- Jean-Sebastien Lemoine – percuphone, bass guitar
- Patrice Lemoine – organ
- Michel Santangelli – drums on "Roc alpin"

Production

- Jean-Pierre Leloir – cover photography
- Gilbert Preneron – engineering
- Andy Scott – engineering
- X... (anonymous) – interior photography
