= Paicu =

Paicu may refer to:

- Paicu, a village in Nicolae Bălcescu commune, Călărași County, Romania
- Paicu, a village in Zîrnești commune, Cahul District, Moldova
- Mount Paiko in Greece, known in Aromanian as Paicu
