= MURI (grant) =

Multidisciplinary University Research Initiative (MURI) is a basic research program sponsored by the US Department of Defense (DoD). Currently each MURI award is about $1.5 million a year for five years.

== Aim ==
"The MURI program supports research by teams of investigators that intersect more than one traditional science and engineering discipline in order to accelerate both research progress and transition of research results to application. Most MURI efforts involve researchers from multiple academic institutions and academic departments.... The MURI program complements other DoD basic research programs that support traditional, single-investigator university research by supporting multidisciplinary teams with larger and longer awards.... Consequently, MURI awards can provide greater sustained support than single-investigator awards for the education and training of students pursuing advanced degrees in science and engineering fields critical to DoD, as well as for associated infrastructure such as research instrumentation.”
