= Pais Movement =

Non-profit organisation in Manchester

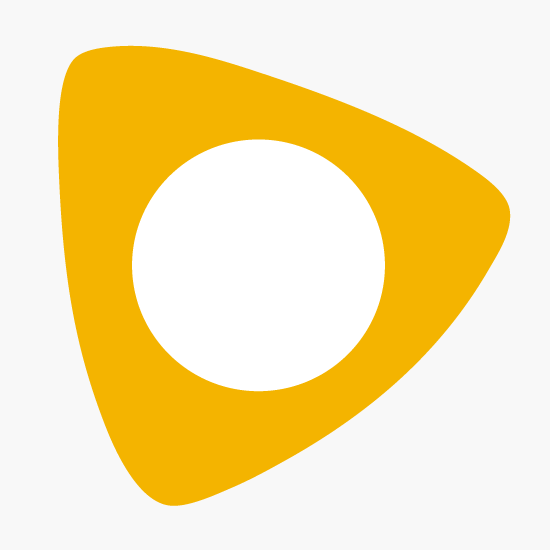
- Pais logo
- Named after: Pais; παῖς, παιδός, ὁ, ἡ (Greek); Meaning; a child servant of a king
- Formation: Established; 1992
- Founder: Paul Clayton Gibbs
- Founded at: Manchester
- Legal status: Nonprofit organization
- Purpose: Missionary work
- Headquarters: Arlington, Texas
- Region served: Global
- Website: paismovement.com

The Pais Movement is a global non-denominational Christian non-profit organization founded in 1992 that focuses on missionary work targeted at schools, communities and businesses. Initially known as the Pais Project, its founder, Paul Clayton Gibbs, established the organization in Manchester, United Kingdom. The Pais Project was renamed the Pais Movement after international expansion. The Pais Movement is currently headquartered in Arlington, Texas, United States.

== History ==
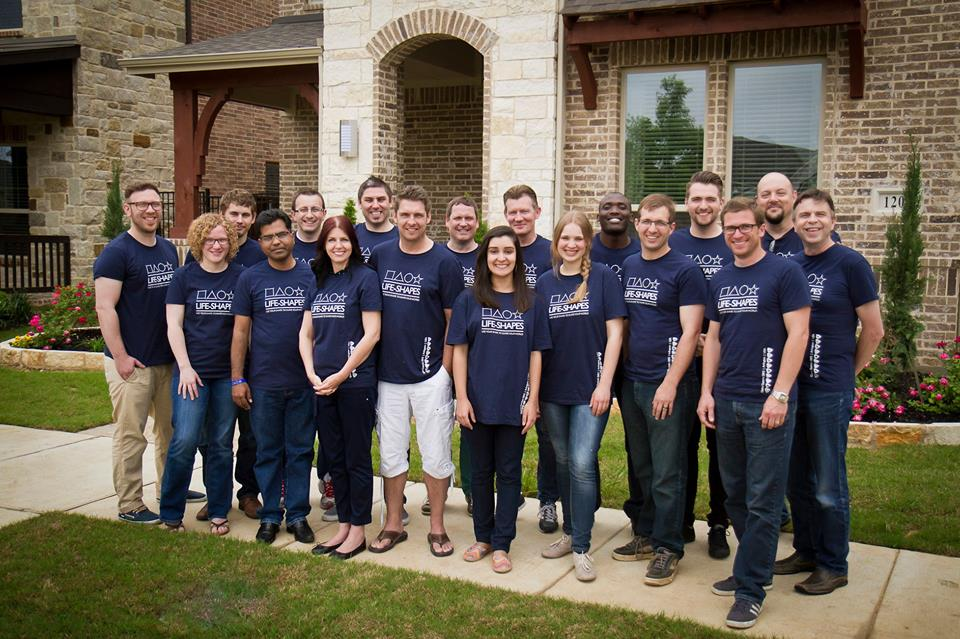
Pais Movement National Directors. 2015.

=== Pais GB ===
In 1992, as a result of connections that were made with various local schools and Sharon Church, the first Pais team was initiated in Moston, Manchester where Gibbs was based. The team consisted of four apprentices who taught lessons and led assemblies, primarily for students aged 11–16 years old.

In 2009, it moved its headquarters from Manchester to Burnley where Pais GB is currently based at Life Church, Burnley. Pais Great Britain was renamed as Pais United Kingdom in 2018.

=== Pais Ireland ===
In 2000, Pais started its first team based in Belfast. In 2010, Pais teams started to work in Cork. Pais Ireland currently has its headquarters in Portrush.

=== Pais USA ===
In 2002, the first Pais nation outside of Europe was established. Pais USA received a special endorsement from Max Lucado, an American best-selling author, writer, and preacher. Pais USA is based in Arlington, Texas with various teams working in schools and youth groups throughout the country.

=== Pais Germany ===
Pais Germany has a unique relationship with the German government wherein the government fully supports the organization. For instance, a year spent as a Pais apprentice is considered as a Voluntary Social Year. Pais Germany headquarters are in Neumünster.

=== Pais Global ===
In October 2005, following Gibbs's relocation to the US, the organization launched a resource center for the worldwide Pais Teams. The headquarters are in Arlington, Texas.

=== Pais Ghana ===
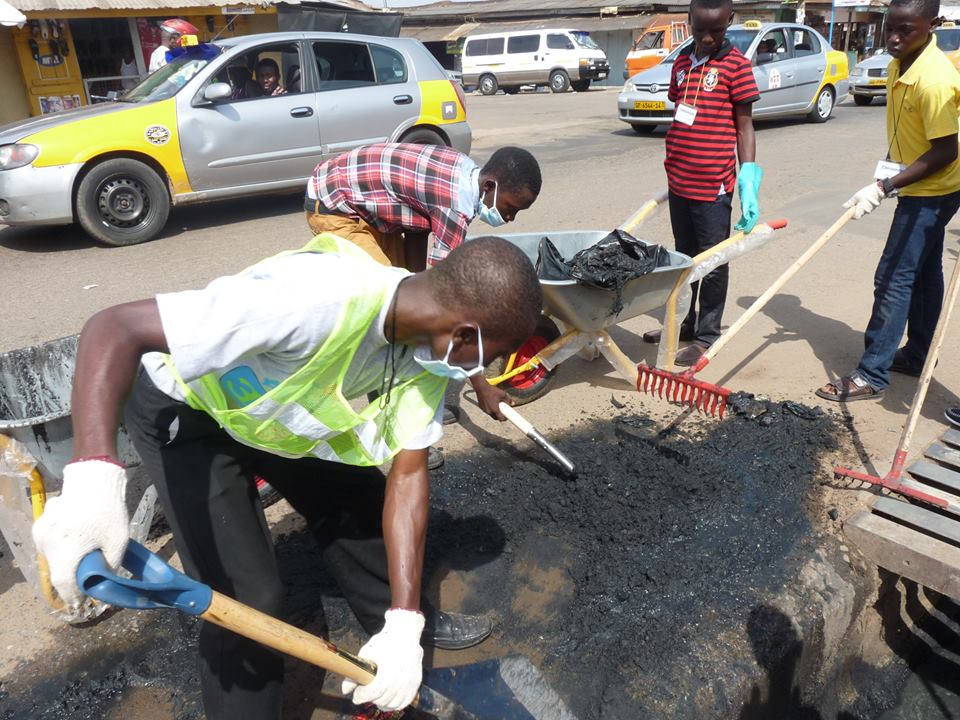
Pais Ghana cleaning a marketplace in Accra. March 2015.

In 2008 the Pais Project extended into Africa. Apprentices mainly work in schools in the capital city of Ghana although teams have also partnered with local churches, hospitals, and orphanages in the neighboring rural areas. Pais Ghana headquarters are in Accra.

=== Pais Brazil ===
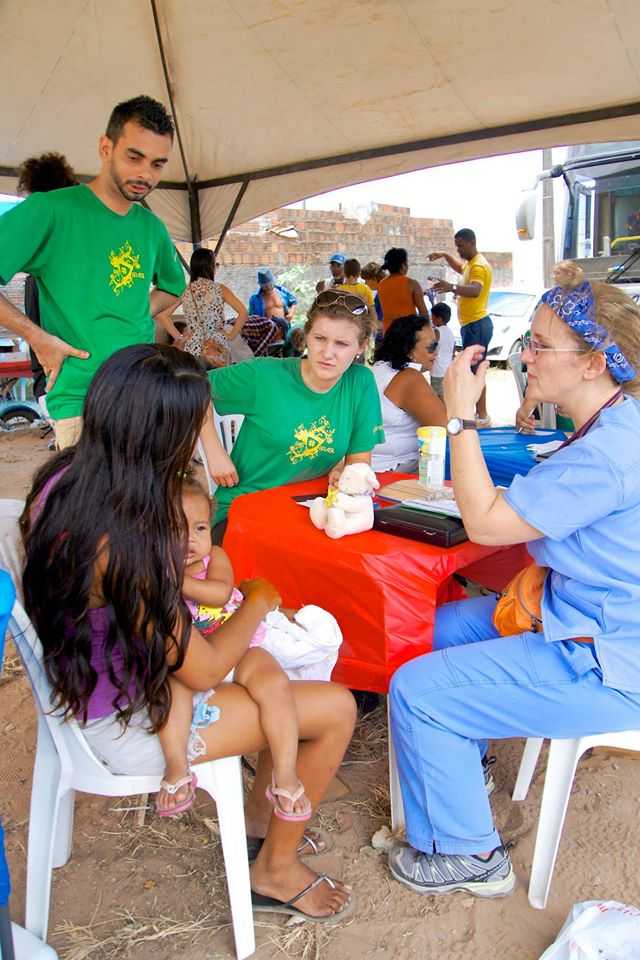
Pais Rio Grande do Norte work alongside medical staff in the 'favelas' in Brazil. 2014.

In 2012, Pais began in South America, working alongside the local church in the schools and heavily populated favelas. Pais Brazil has its headquarters in Natal, Rio Grande do Norte.

=== Pais India ===
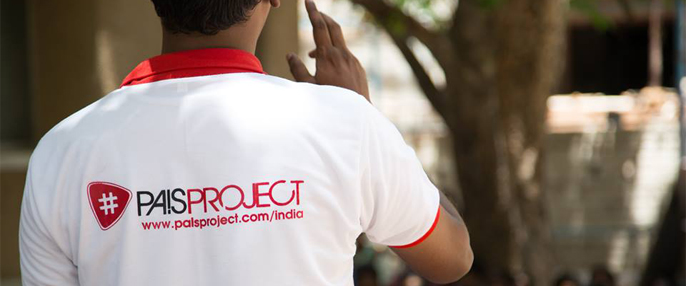
Pais India member

Pais India was established in 2013 by an Indian Pais apprentice who had trained for two years with Pais GB. He returned to India in July 2013 and started Pais India with various colleagues, reaching schools and campuses surrounding Chennai.

=== Pais Pakistan ===
The organization has released little information about its work in Pakistan for the security of its staff and apprentices.

=== Pais Kenya ===
Pais Kenya launched in 2014. It was initially established in Nairobi and grew to other cities, such as Zimmerman, where it extended its work in local schools and youth groups.

=== Pais Australia ===
Pais Australia is currently based in both Brisbane and south of Sydney.

=== Rest of the World ===
Pais reached more nations, whether equipped with entire teams, specialists, or ongoing relationships with communities who are interested in bringing Pais into their region. These nations include: Austria, Bangladesh, Canada, Democratic Republic of Congo, Denmark, Faroe Islands, Nigeria, South Africa, Tanzania, Uganda, Switzerland, and the Philippines.

== Founder ==
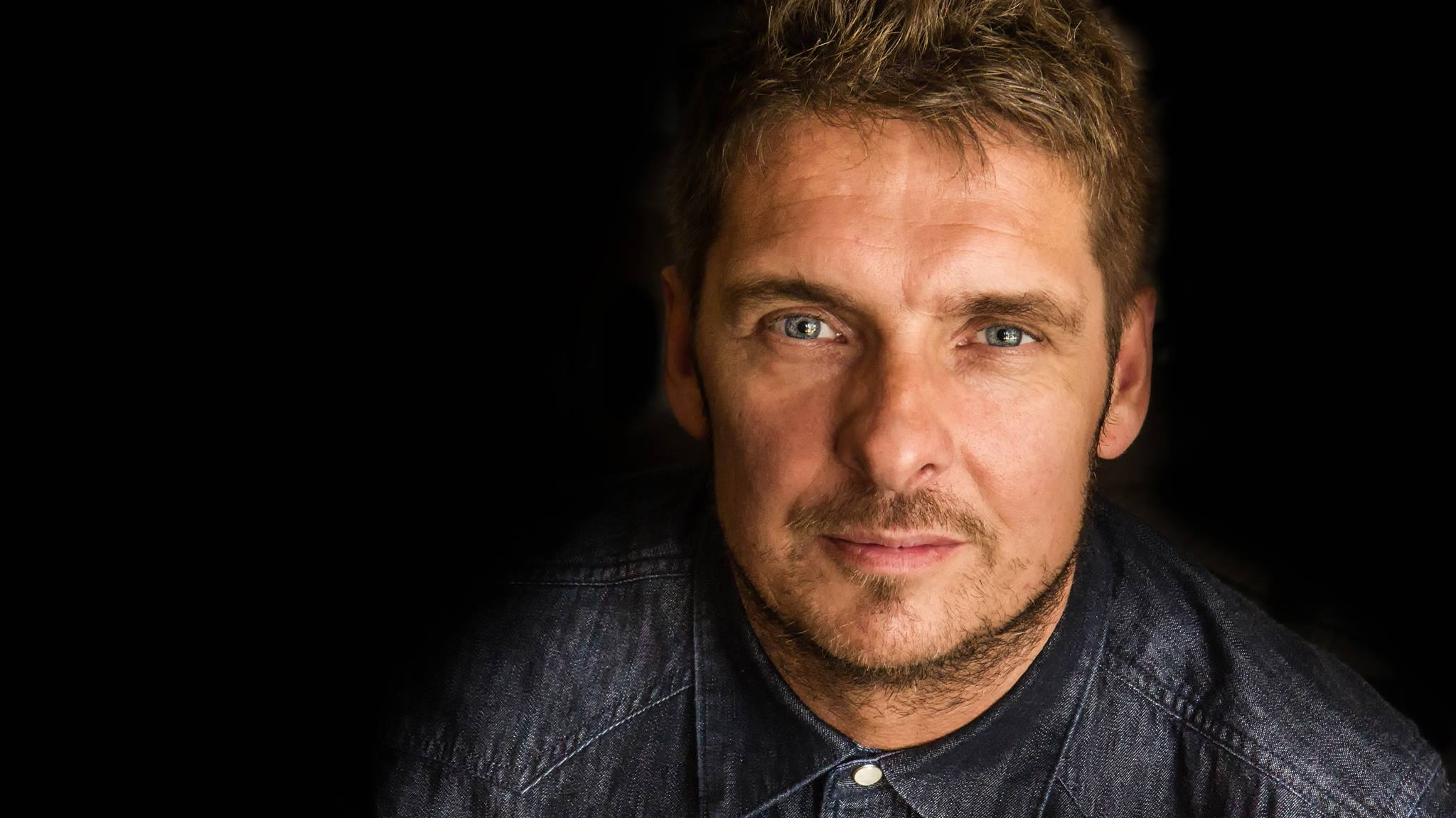
Paul Clayton Gibbs. Founding Director of the Pais Movement.

Paul Clayton Gibbs is the founder and director of the Pais Movement. Born in Manchester, Great Britain, he is married to Lynn and has two children.

Gibbs' early career was in retail management but he later decided to work full-time at his local church. He established contacts with local schools which eventually led to the concept of the Pais Project being launched in 1992. The Pais Project was established as an inter-denominational youth and schools' ministry. Gibbs worked as a youth leader within his local church and directed Pais teams in the area.

In the mid-1990s, Gibbs became a director with Youth Alive. In 2000, Gibbs became the senior minister at the faith works in Failsworth, Oldham, a church that partnered with The Message Trust and set up the Eden Project, an award-winning community project.

In 2005, Gibbs moved to the US where he worked at a Texan megachurch. In 2009, Gibbs committed himself full-time to the development of Pais, launching various initiatives and resources such as mypais.com and Livewire, a weekly training video.

Gibbs teaches on topics which include pioneering, leadership development and religion. His books are published by Harris House Publishing.

== Pais Programs ==
Apprenticeships

The Pais Movement offers "free" apprenticeships. The apprenticeship includes training, accommodation, and meals. Upon successful completion apprentices receive a recognized certificate. Apprentices may serve as a part of the following team types: Pais Project, Pais Venture, Pais Collective, Pais Infrastructure.

Youth Academy

Pais Movement offers free faith-based training and mentorship to teenagers. Teenagers are disciples in Pais' three distinct disciplines: mission, discipleship, and study. Pais apprentices lead youth academy members to experiences that lead to an education based on biblical principles.

Allies Program

Pais Movement provides ministry training and resources through an online platform called MyPais. Affiliates may register for course material and select online, or in-person training.

== Training and Resources ==
=== MYPAIS ===
MYPAIS is a website that provides a free resource of online training videos, brochures & programs that serve as a catalyst toward a defined goal.

=== SWAP ===
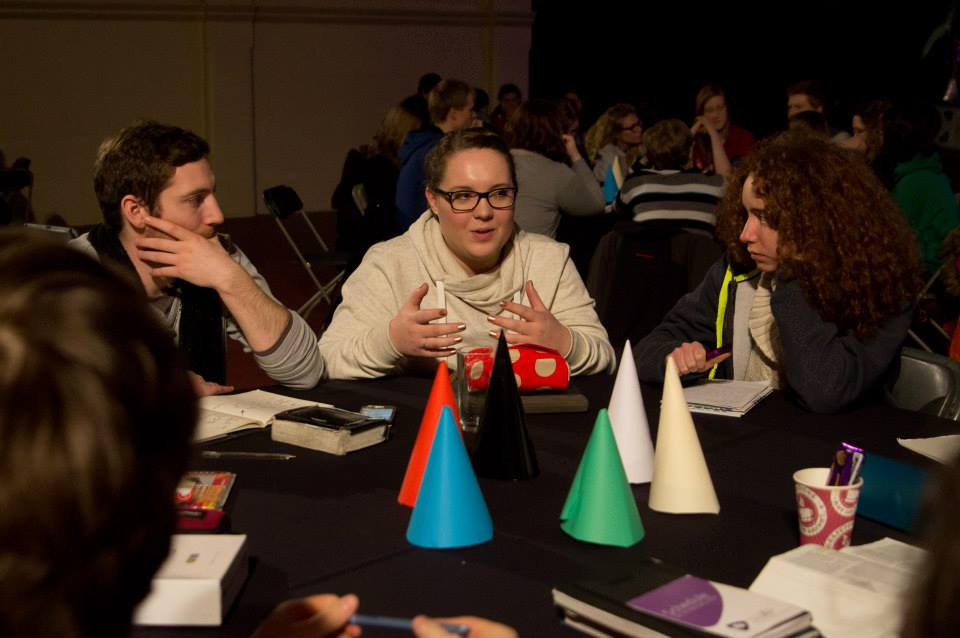
Discussion at a Swap Conference. Pais GB.

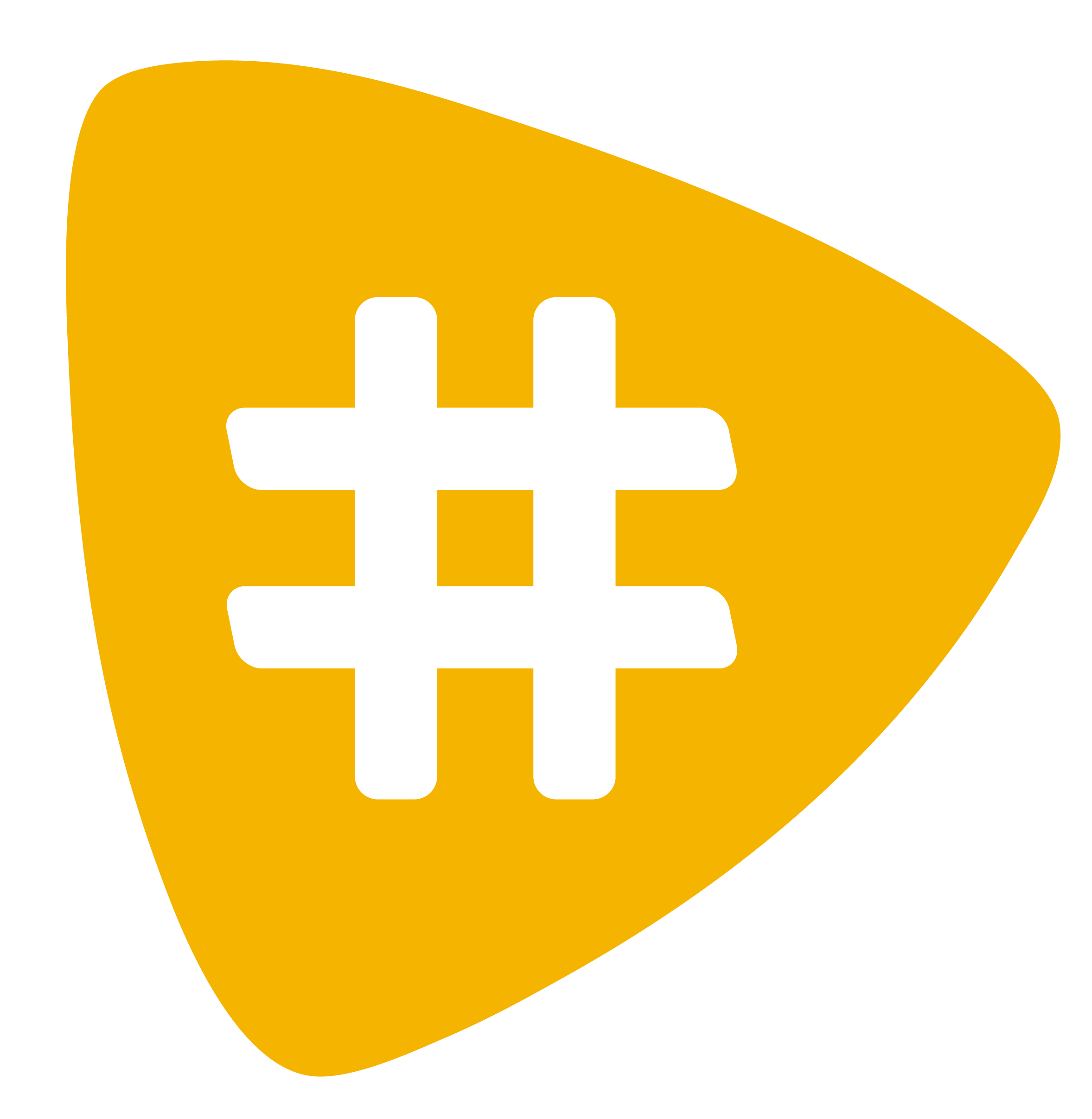
Pais Project

SWAP is an international three-day conference held on various continents that promotes discussion of the three Pais disciplines: mission, discipleship, and study.

=== Apprenticeship Programs ===
Pais has worked with schools, universities, churches, and businesses.

Pais Project

A Pais Project team works with churches and their surrounding schools and community.

=== Pais Collective ===
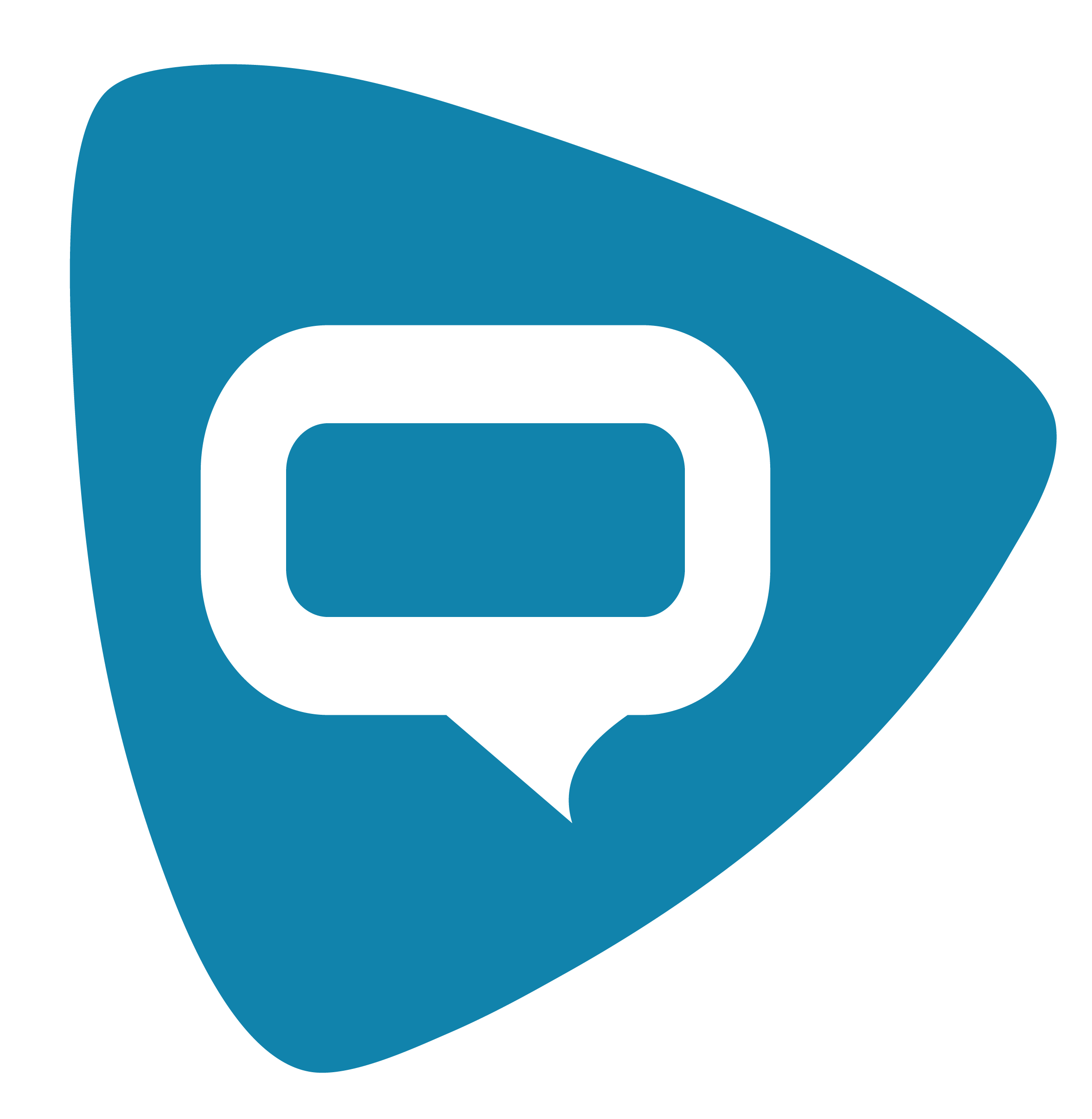
Pais Collective

A Pais Collective team works with adults to promote evangelism.

=== Pais Venture ===
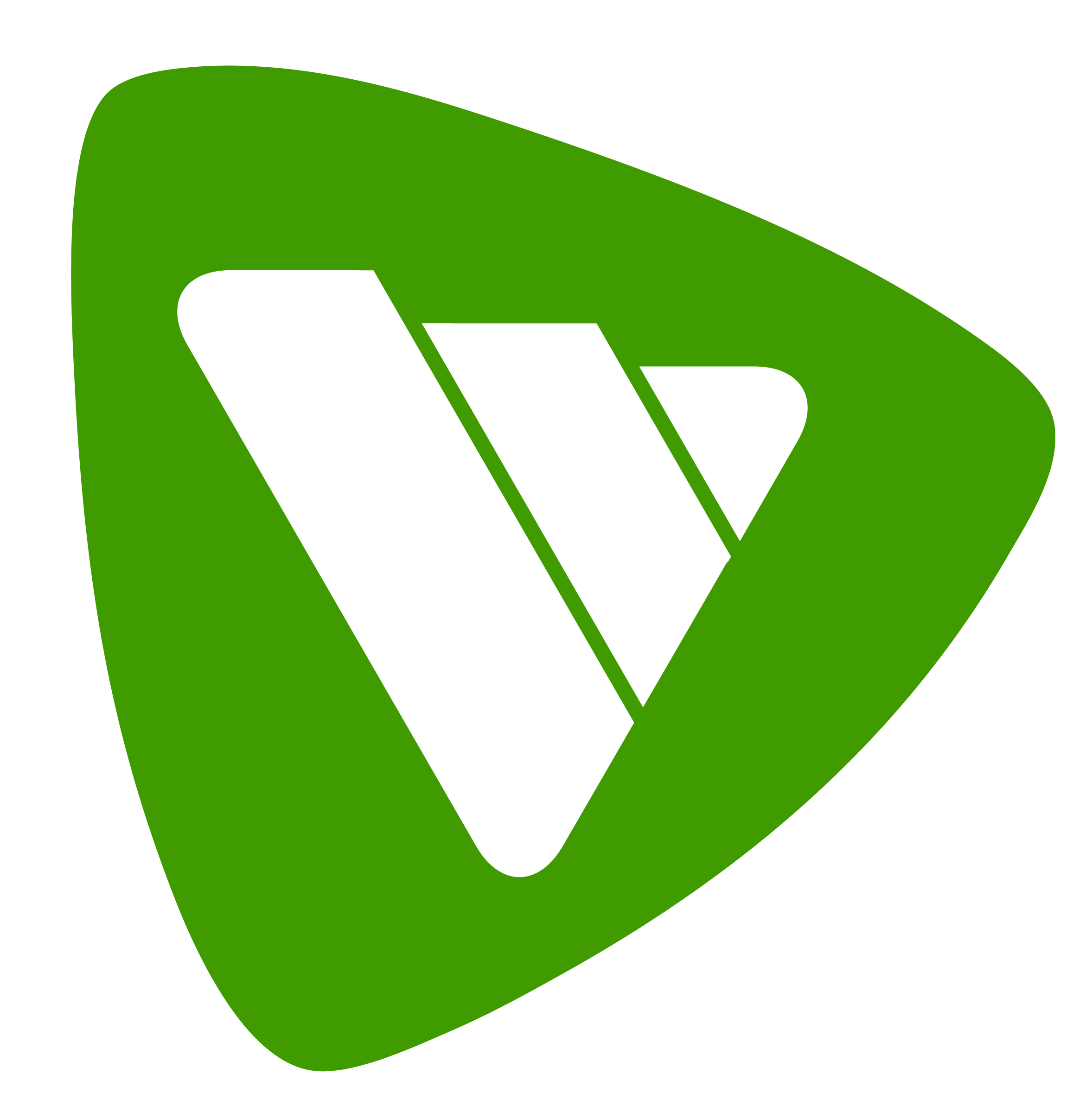
Pais Venture

A Pais Venture team works with businesses to promote evangelism.

=== Pais Infrastructure ===
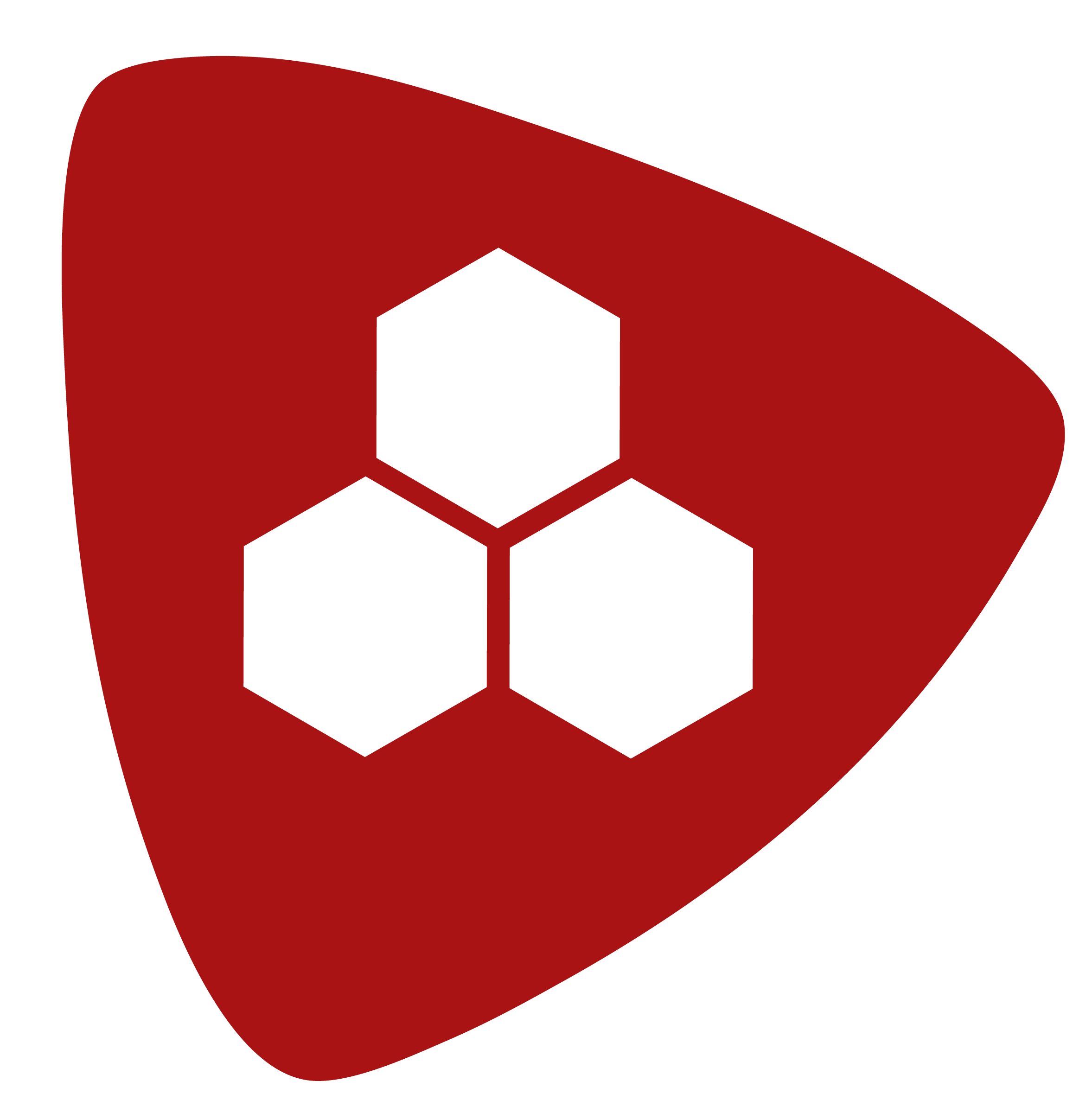
Pais Infrastructure

Apprentices serve in an office environment and provide logistical and resource support to Pais teams globally. Apprentices may serve in 5 areas of support: finance, training, personnel, communications, and media.
