= IEEE Transactions on Plasma Science =

- Discipline: Plasma science and engineering
- Language: English
- Edited by: Edl Schamiloglu

Publication details
- History: 1973-present
- Publisher: IEEE Nuclear and Plasma Sciences Society
- Frequency: Monthly
- Impact factor: 1.222 (2020)

Standard abbreviations
- ISO 4: IEEE Trans. Plasma Sci.

Indexing
- CODEN: ITPSBD
- ISSN: 0093-3813
- LCCN: 73645280
- ISSN: 1939-9375

Links
- Journal homepage; Online access

IEEE Transactions on Plasma Science is a peer-reviewed scientific journal published monthly by the IEEE Nuclear and Plasma Sciences Society. The journal covers plasma science and engineering, including but not limited to magnetohydrodynamics, thermionics, space plasma and plasma-wave interactions. Its current editor-in-chief is Edl Schamiloglu, a distinguished professor in the department of electrical and computer engineering at the University of New Mexico.

The journal was established in 1973. According to the Journal Citation Reports, it has a 2020 impact factor of 1.222. In between 2000 and 2004, it was ranked as number 10 for the impact factor in "Physics - Fluids & Plasmas" by Thomson.
