= Kozmetika (album) =

Studio album by Kozmetika
- Released: 7 March 1983
- Recorded: 1979–1982
- Studio: Jovanova St. 56, Jevremova St. 45, and MS studio, Belgrade
- Genre: New wave; art rock; synth-pop; electronic music; experimental music
- Length: 34:24
- Label: ZKP RTLJ
- Producer: Kozmetika

Kozmetika (trans. Cosmetics) is the only album by the Yugoslav new wave/art rock band Kozmetika, released in 1983.

The album Kozmetika was polled in 1998 as the 98th on the list of 100 Greatest Yugoslav Popular Music Albums in the book YU 100: najbolji albumi jugoslovenske rok i pop muzike (YU 100: The Best Albums of Yugoslav Pop and Rock Music).

== Background and recording ==
Kozmetika was officially formed in 1978 by Vladimir Jovanović (guitar, vocals), Marko Pešić (synthesizer), Slobodan Konjević (bass guitar) and Mihajlo "Miško" Mihajlovski (rhythm machine programming), although Jovanović, Pešić and Konjević had been working together since 1974, first in the band Dijamantski Psi (Diamond Dogs) and then under the name Spajalice (The Staples). At the time of Kozmetika formation, Jovanović, Pešić and Konjović were all already notable figures on Belgrade cultural scene: Jovanović was a painter, Pešić was a director and Konjović was a music editor at Studio B radio. Due to their individual activities, as well as their work with pop culture magazine Izgled, the band did not work continuously on the record. They spent four years recording the album, working patiently on each track with numerous guest appearances. The album featured guest appearances by Goran Vejvoda (guitar) and Dragana Šarić (vocals) of the band Annoda Rouge, Srđan Šaper (vocals) and Nebojša Krstić (vocals) of the new wave band Idoli, Raša Đelmaš (drums) of the hard rock band Zebra, Zlatko Manojlović (guitar) of the heavy metal band Gordi, Goran Bregović (guitar) of the rock band Bijelo Dugme, Đorđe Ilijin (flute) of the progressive rock band Tako, Vuk Vujačić (saxophone), Zoran Radetić (electric piano) and Bora Pavićević (percussion). Inspired by the works of Brian Eno as well as the current musical trends, the band used a technique in album production similar to the one which would later be known as sampling, creating their own vision of art rock. However, due to uncommunicative sound, the album failed to reach much feedback from the audience, with only the song "Utisci", featuring Nebojša Krstić on lead vocals, becoming a minor hit. After the album release, the band did not perform often, and soon ended their activity.

== Track listing ==
All songs credited to Kozmetika.

Side A
No.	Title	Length
1.	"Utisci" ("Impressions")	4:17
2.	"Jedne noći na terasi na moru" ("On a Night on a Seaside Terrace")	3:43
3.	"Kundalini" ("Kundalini")	1:06
4.	"Ona hoće sve da zna" ("She Wants to Know Everything")	4:15
5.	"Belzebub" ("Beelzebub")	2:30
6.	"12-erac" ("Dodecasyllable")	0:46

Side B
No.	Title	Length
1.	"Zanatlija" ("Craftsman")	2:54
2.	"Ne da/ne nego i/ili" ("Not Yes/No, but And/Or")	4:34
3.	"Bluz kontrolora letenja" ("An Air Traffic Controller's Blues")	2:37
4.	"Gaja" ("Gaia")	7:37

== Personnel ==
- Vladimir Jovanović - vocals, guitar, synthesizer
- Marko Pešić - vocals, synthesizer, mixing
- Slobodan Konjović - vocals, bass guitar, vocoder effects, recording and mix
- Mihajlo Mihajlovski - rhythm machine programming

=== Guest musicians and additional personnel ===
- Nebojša Krstić - vocals (on track A1), backing vocals (on track A4)
- Dragana Šarić - vocals (on track B2)
- Goran Vejvoda - guitar (on tracks: A1, A4, A5, A6, B4), electric piano (on track A5)
- Zlatko Manojlović - guitar (on track A4)
- Goran Bregović - guitar (on track B2)
- Raša Đelmaš - drums (on tracks: A1, A2, A5)
- Bora Pavićević - drums (on tracks: A4, B1, B2), congas, percussion (on track B4)
- Zoran Radetić - electric piano (on track A4)
- Žarko Kalmić - synthesizer (on tracks: B1, B2)
- Vuk Vujačić - saxophone (on tracks: A2, A5)
- Đorđe Ilijin - flute (on track: B5)
- Srđan Šaper - backing vocals (on track A4)
- Biljana Trifunović - voice (on track B2)
- Vlada Nikodijević - vocoder effects (on track B4)
- Boban Petrović - engineer
- Rade Ercegovac - engineer
- Jugoslav Jovanović - design

== Legacy ==
Kozmetika was polled in 1998 as the 98th on the list of 100 Greatest Yugoslav Popular Music Albums in the book YU 100: najbolji albumi jugoslovenske rok i pop muzike (YU 100: The Best Albums of Yugoslav Pop and Rock Music).

In 2006 the song "Utisci" ("Impressions") was ranked No. 99 the B92 Top 100 Domestic Songs List. The song has also been used as the theme song for Olja Bećković's political talk show Utisak nedelje (Impression of the Week), initially broadcast on RTV Studio B, and later on B92 and Nova S. For the 20th anniversary of the talk show the Viva Vox Choir from Belgrade covered "Utisci" and the version has become the new theme song for the show.

In 2015 the Kozmetika album cover, designed by Jugoslav Jovanović, was ranked 47th on the list of 100 Greatest Album Covers of Yugoslav Rock published by web magazine Balkanrock.
