= Kozmetika =

Serbian new wave/art rock band

- The founding members of Kozmetika, from left to right: Marko Pešić, Slobodan Konjović and Vladimir Jovanović

Background information
- Also known as: Dijamantski Psi, Spajalice
- Origin: Belgrade, SR Serbia, SFR Yugoslavia
- Genres: New wave; post-punk; art rock; synth-pop; krautrock; electronic music; experimental music
- Years active: 1978–1983
- Label: ZKP RTLJ
- Past members: Vladimir Jovanović; Marko Pešić; Slobodan Konjović; Miroslav Mihajlovski

Kozmetika (Serbian Cyrillic: Козметика; trans. Cosmetics) was a Yugoslav new wave/art rock band formed in Belgrade in 1978. Kozmetika were one of the pioneers of the Yugoslav new wave scene, as well as promoters of the Yugoslav new wave culture through their pop culture magazine Izgled.

Kozmetika members Vladimir Jovanović (guitar, vocals), Marko Pešić (synthesizer) and Slobodan Konjević (bass guitar) started performing together in 1974 in the band Dijamantski Psi. All three were at the time already notable figures in Belgrade cultural scene: Jovanović was a painter, Pešić was a director and Konjović was a music editor at Studio B radio. In 1978, they started working under the name Kozmetika, adding Mihajlo "Miško" Mihajlovski (rhythm machine programming) to the lineup. Due to individual activities of the members, the band the did not have continuous work on the debut album recording and had spent four years working on their only album. Kozmetika, released in 1983 and featuring guest appearances by numerous prominent musicians of the Yugoslav rock scene, featured the combination of current musical trends with artistic and experimental tendencies. Soon after album release, the group disbanded, the members of the band dedicating themselves to activities in various fields of culture. The only member of the band to continue his musical career was Mihajlovski, who formed the synth-pop band D' Boys.

== History ==
=== The beginnings: Dijamantski Psi and Spajalice (1974–1978) ===
In 1974, influenced by David Bowie's album Diamond Dogs, painter Vladimir Jovanović, director Marko Pešić, Studio B music editor Slobodan Konjović, and Saša Nikolić, the owner of the discothèque at the Atelje 212 theatre, formed the band Dijamantski Psi (Diamond Dogs); Konjović was previously a vocalist for the 1960s band Studenti (The Students), consisting of himself, Božidar "Lari" Plesničar (guitar), Branko Gluščević (rhythm guitar), and Miroslav Minić (drums), and had a minor role in Živojin Pavlović's 1967 film When I Am Dead and Gone. However, Dijamantski Psi career was interrupted at the very beginning, as Jovanović and Pešić were incarcerated due to marijuana growing.

After Pešić and Jovanović were released from prison, in 1976, the band continued working, changing the name for a short period of time to Spajalice (The Staples). The band finally started working under the name Kozmetika in 1978, named after a combination of the words Kosmička Etika (Cosmic Ethics).

=== 1978–1983 ===
Kozmetika featured Vladimir Jovanović on guitar and vocals, Marko Pešić on synthesizer, Slobodan Konjović on bass guitar and Mihajlo "Miško" Mihajlovski, who programmed the rhythm machine. The following year, Jovanović got the award Sedam Sekretara SKOJ-a (Seven Secretaries of the League of Communist Youth of Yugoslavia) for his works as a painter, and the band started preparing their debut album. Simultaneously, the band worked on publishing the pop culture magazine Izgled, inspired by Andy Warhol's magazine Interview. It was on the promotion of the magazine's first issue, held at the Belgrade Students' Cultural Center, that the band had their first live performance under the name Kozmetika.

Not having a continuous work on the album recording, the band had spent four years recording their debut self-titled album, working patiently on each track with numerous guest appearances. Kozmetika, released in 1983 by ZKP RTLJ, featured Goran Vejvoda (guitar) and Dragana Šarić (vocals) of the band Annoda Rouge, Srđan Šaper (vocals) and Nebojša Krstić (vocals) of the new wave band Idoli, Raša Đelmaš (drums) of the hard rock band Zebra, Zlatko Manojlović (guitar) of the heavy metal band Gordi, Goran Bregović (guitar) of the rock band Bijelo Dugme, Đorđe Ilijin (flute) of the progressive rock band Tako, Vuk Vujačić (saxophone), Zoran Radetić (electric piano) and Bora Pavićević (percussion). Inspired by the works of Brian Eno as well as the current musical trends, the band used a technique in album production similar to the one which would later be known as sampling, creating their own vision of art rock. However, due to uncommunicative sound, the album failed to reach much feedback from the audience, with only the song "Utisci" ("Impressions"), featuring Nebojša Krstić on lead vocals, becoming a minor hit. After the album release, the band performed rarely, and soon ended their activity.

=== Post breakup ===
After the Kozmetika disbandment, the only member to continue his musical career was Mihajlo "Miško" Mihajlovski, forming the synth-pop band D' Boys with Predrag "Peđa" Jovanović. After the band split up in 1984, he performed for some time as a solo artist, and at the end of the 1980s performed with Bebi Dol, retiring from the scene with the outbreak of the Yugoslav Wars. He died on 2 December 2011.

Slobodan Konjović worked as a producer while being a Kozmetika member, producing both of Pekinška Patka studio albums, Plitka poezija and Strah od monotonije, as well as the Električni Orgazam live EP Warszawa '81. He continued his work on Studio B, and is today often referred to as the "Serbian John Peel". In 2006, he appeared as guest vocalist and composer on Vasko Serafimov's studio album Here.

Vladimir Jovanović in the mid-1980s moved to Netherlands, where he still resides.

== Legacy ==
The band's live appearance on 6 April 1977 at the Belgrade Students' Cultural Center is arguably taken as the beginning of the new wave scene in SR Serbia.

The band's debut and only album Kozmetika was polled in 1998 as the 98th on the list of 100 Greatest Yugoslav Popular Music Albums in the book YU 100: najbolji albumi jugoslovenske rok i pop muzike (YU 100: The Best albums of Yugoslav pop and rock music).

In 2006 the song "Utisci" ("Impressions") was ranked No. 99 the B92 Top 100 Domestic Songs List. The song has also been used as the theme song for the Olja Bećković's political talk show Utisak nedelje (Impression of the Week), initially broadcast on RTV Studio B, and later on B92 and Nova S. For the 20th anniversary of the talk show the Viva Vox Choir from Belgrade covered "Utisci" and the version has become the new theme song for the show.

== Discography ==
=== Studio albums ===
- Kozmetika (1983)

== See also ==
- New wave music in Yugoslavia
