= Dʼ Boys =

D' Boys
- Dʼ Boys founding members and the band's core: Peđa D'Boy and Mihajlo "Miško" Mihajlovski

Background information
- Origin: Belgrade, SR Serbia, SFR Yugoslavia
- Genres: Synth-pop; pop rock
- Years active: 1982–1984
- Labels: Jugoton, Take It Or Leave It Records
- Past members: Peđa D'Boy; Mihajlo Mihajlovski; Goran Vejvoda; Miško Plavi; Dragan Ilić; Zoran Miljuš; Jean-Jacques Roscam

D' Boys (pronounced as The Boys) was a Yugoslav synth-pop/pop rock band formed in Belgrade in 1982.

Originally formed as a duo consisting of Peđa D'Boy (real name Predrag Jovanović, vocals and guitar, formerly of German band Jane) and Mihajlo "Miško" Mihajlovski (percussion), D' Boys initially performed minimalist synth-pop, with campy lyrics dealing with nightlife, parties and girls. After the lineup included guitarist Goran Vejvoda and bass guitarist Miško Plavi, D' Boys, while keeping their stylistic orientation, moved towards more rock-oriented sound. The band released their debut album Ajd' se zezamo in 1983, gaining notable mainstream popularity. After the release of their second album Muvanje in 1984, Mihajovski left the band, and the rest of the lineup continued performing as Peđa D' Boy Band, releasing two albums before disbanding in 1986.

== History ==
=== 1982–1985 ===
The band was formed in 1982, initially as a duo consisting of Peđa D'Boy (real name Predrag Jovanović, vocals, guitar) and Mihajlo "Miško" Mihajlovski, percussion, rhythm machine programming). During the 1960s, Jovanović was a vocalist for the band Lutalice (The Wanderers), made a cameo appearance in Živojin Pavlović's film When I Am Dead and Gone, performed in French cafes and metro stations, and spent some time on Goa beaches in India, where he performed with jazz and rock musicians from all over the world. During the 1970s, he owned a boutique of leather clothes at Ibiza, where he met members of the German progressive/krautrock band Jane, soon becoming their vocalist and rhythm guitarist. With Jane he recorded their 1980 self-titled album, containing the hit "Love Your Life". Mihajlovski was previously a member of the new wave/art rock band Kozmetika and was one of the artists involved in the work of the pop culture magazine Izgled. Upon his 1982 return to Belgrade, Jovanović decided to join the city's music scene. After a jam session held in Belgrade's Students' Cultural Center during the exhibition of the comic book artist Igor Kordej, Jovanović and Mihajlovski decided to start collaborating. Initially, their joint act was known as Peđa i Miško (Peđa and Miško), and later Oksižen (Oxygen, after Peđa D'Boy's dyed hair), until they finally adopted the name D' Boys, suggested by the host of a popular music TV-show Hit meseca (Hit of the Month) Dubravka Marković and her then-boyfriend Srđan "Gile" Gojković of Električni Orgazam.

The band initially performed minimalist music-influenced songs about parties and girls, such as their debut 7-inch single with the songs "Mi smo D' Boys" ("We Are D' Boys") and "Plave oči, crna ljubav" ("Blue Eyes, Dark Love"). The single led to them being booked as a support act at concerts of some prominent Yugoslav groups at the time such as Film, Boa and Aerodrom. During 1982, they frequently performed in Students' Cultural Center, at Ada Ciganlija and in Belgrade club DOK. The duo attracted the attention of the audience and the press with their frequent club performances, their image and flirting with gay aesthetics. However, they were frequently lampooned by the music critics because of their campy and frivolous lyrics dealing with nightlife, parties and girls, flavoured with typical Belgrade humorous slang.

In the autumn of 1982, two new musicians joined the band: guitarist Goran Vejvoda, formerly of the band Annoda Rouge, and multi-instrumentalist Miško Plavi (Miško the Blonde, real name Milivoje Petrović), who was previously a member of the new wave band VIA Talas and in D' Boys initially played bass guitar. Having two members nicknamed Miško often led to confusion among their fans and in the media. With the new lineup, the band kept their stylistic orientation, but moving towards more rock-oriented sound. Soon, Goran Vejvoda left, so Miško Plavi switched to guitar, while Dragan "Gagi" Ilić, who previously worked with singer Slađana Milošević, became the new bass player.

The band released their debut album Ajd' se zezamo (Let's Fool Around) in the spring of 1983. The album was recorded in the Tetrapak studio in Split and produced by Željko Brodarić "Jappa", with the former Miss Yugoslavia Ana Sasso singing the backing vocals. The album cover was designed by Igor Kordej. Beside "Mi smo D' Boys", the album featured an English language version of the song, entitled "We Are D' Boys". Alongside the title track, the songs "Draž" ("Charm"), "Sinjorita" ("Señorita") and "Sexy, sexy" received most airplay. In their homecity the band promoted the album with a concert in Atelje 212 theatre.

During the spring of 1984, D' Boys released their second album, Muvanje (Hitting On), produced by Oliver Mandić and featuring members of the hard rock band Generacija 5 Dragan Jovanović (guitar) and Dragoljub Ilić (keyboards, arrangements, rhythm machine programming) as guests. The album featured a cover of Roy Orbison song "Oh, Pretty Woman" entitled "Lepe žene" ("Pretty Women"), a cover of old town music song "Što (Ima dana)" ("Why (There Are Days)"), and the track "Jugoslovenka (Ljupka oko pupka)" ("Yugoslav Girl (Lovely Around Her Waist)"), which would soon go on to become the band's biggest hit. Other songs which saw large airplay were "Give Me Your Money", "Snežana" and the ballad "Florida (Mala moja, ne plači)" ("Florida (Baby, Don't You Cry)"). After the album release, two new members were added to the lineup: drummer Zoran "Cole" Miljuš, and guitarist Jean-Jacques Roscam, a Belgian of Zaire origin. During the summer of 1984, the group performed in Greece. The band had their last performance in the discotheque Amnezia in Salonica. After they returned to Yugoslavia, Mihajlovski left the band and started performing as Miško D' Boys, while the remainder of the group continued as Peđa D'Boy Band.

=== Post breakup: Peđa D'Boy Band and other works by former members ===
In 1985, Peđa D'Boy Band released the album Avantura (Adventure), produced by Peđa D'Boy and Boban Petrović. The video recorded for the song "Visibabe, ljubičice" ("Snowdrops, Violets") was banned from Yugoslav television due to its erotic imagery. In 1985, Peđa D'Boy took part in YU Rock Misija, the Yugoslav contribution to Live Aid, providing the vocals for the charity song "Za milion godina", and Peđa D'Boy Band performed on the corresponding charity concert, held on Red Star Stadium on 15 June 1985. During the same year, Peđa D'Boy represented Yugoslavia at the Song of Mediterranean festival in Palermo, winning the second place with "Jugoslovenka", and sang in the duet "Bubi" with Bilja Krstić, released on her album Iz unutrašnjeg džepa (From the Inner Pocket). Soon after, Jean-Jacques Roscam left the band to join Galija, while Dragan Ilić died of complications caused by gastric ulcer operation. In 1986, Peđa D'Boy Band released the album Laku noć ti, mala (Goodnight, Baby), produced by Kornelije Kovač, who also composed four songs for the album. Beside Peđa D' Boy, Miško Plavi and Zoran Miljuš, the album featured Kornelije Kovač and Boban Petrović on keyboards, Dragan Jovanović and Srđan Miodragović on guitar and Ivan Švager on saxophone. The song "Šta da radim s rukama" ("What Should I Do with My Hands") featured guest appearance by actor Ratko Tankosić. After the album release, the band went on a short tour across Greece with Riblja Čorba and Galija, after which they ended their activity.

Peđa D'Boy performed briefly as a solo artist. He appeared at the 1986 MESAM festival with the song "Mrzim da spavam sam" ("I Hate Sleeping Alone"), and at the end of the year he moved back to France. He made a brief appearance in Belgrade in 1992, to perform at a retro concert of Yugoslav pop and rock music held in Belgrade Youth Center. In 1997, in London, he recorded some new material, produced by Mark Evans, including a remix of "Jugoslovenka". The material was published on an EP. He returned to Serbia in 2006, having his comeback appearance as a guest at Delča i Sklekovi concert in Belgrade Youth Center. He continued to perform and record as a solo artist, backed by the group Polyester Shock. In 2006, he released the EP with the song "Beograđanka", a new version of "'Ajd se zezamo", and a French language version of "Jugoslovenka", entitled "La fille Yougoslavie". He released his comeback album General in 2008, followed by 2010 album 72-3 and the 2014 album Moj put / Paranemija (My Way / Paranaemia), all featuring new songs alongside new versions of old songs. He participated in the Big Brother VIP reality show and acted in Vladimir Rajčić's 2009 film Serbian Scars.

After Peđa D' Boy Band disbanded, Miško Plavi and Zoran Miljuš formed the short-lived group Fantazija (Fantasy) with guitarist Vojislav Bešić "Beške" (formerly of Bezobrazno Zeleno), vocalist Igor Pervić (formerly of Duh Nibor) and keyboardist Goran Matić, the group disbanding after only a year. After that, Miško Plavi moved to Piloti, where he played bass guitar. After Piloti, he moved to Ekatarina Velika and eventually formed his Miško Plavi Band. At the beginning of the 2000s he moved to Japan and started performing as an accordionist, cooperating with a number of Japanese musicians and holding a large number of concerts across the world.

After leaving D' Boys, Mihajlovski performed for some time as a solo artist, and in 1987 started performing in clubs with singer Bebi Dol. He died on 2 December 2011.

In 2018, the first official D' Boys compilation, entitled Mi smo D' Boys: The Very Best Of, was released through Take It Or Leave It Records.

== Legacy ==
Serbian girl group Models covered the song "Jugoslovenka" on their 1997 album Made in Belgrade. Serbian and Yugoslav rock singer Viktorija recorded a cover of "Jugoslovenka" on her 2000 live album Nostalgija (Nostalgia). The song appeared in Srđan Dragojević's 1996 film Pretty Village, Pretty Flame.

In 2006, the song "Mi smo D' Boys" was ranked No. 100 on the B92 Top 100 Domestic Songs list.

== Discography ==
=== Studio albums ===
- Ajd' se zezamo (1983)
- Muvanje (1984)

=== Compilation albums ===
- Mi smo D' Boys: The Very Best Of (2018)

=== Singles ===
- "Mi smo D' Boys" / "Crne oči, plava ljubav" (1983)
- "Jugoslovenka" / "Florida (Mala moja ne plači)" (1984)
