= Queen of Death =

Queen of Death may refer to:

- Queen of Death (album), a 1982 heavy metal album by Gordi.
- Queen of Death (EP), a 1986 thrash metal album by Atomkraft.
- Lynne Abraham (born 1941), District Attorney of the City of Philadelphia, nicknamed "Queen of Death".
