= Čovek =

Studio album by Gordi
- Released: 1978
- Studio: Akademik Studio, Ljubljana
- Genre: Progressive rock; hard rock
- Length: 42:20
- Label: ZKP RTLJ
- Producer: Zlatko Manojlović

Gordi chronology
Čovek (1978)	Gordi 2 (1979)

Čovek (trans. "A Man") is the 1978 debut studio album by Yugoslav rock band Gordi.

Čovek is Gordi's only studio album to be recorded with bass guitarist Zdenko Pomper, who was replaced by Slobodan Svrdlan shortly after the album release.

The album features the song "Misli" ("Thoughts"), which was previously released as the B-side of the single "Žeđ" ("Thirst"), the last single released by Gordi leader Zlatko Manojlović's previous band Dah. The lyrics for the song "Odlazim u noć" ("I'm Leaving into the Night") were written by Predrag Vuković, percussionist of the band Igra Staklenih Perli.

== Track listing ==
No.	Title	Lyrics	Music	Length
1.	"Čovek" ("A Man")	Z. Manojlović	Z. Manojlović	5:11
2.	"Budi gord i jak" ("Be Proud and Strong")	Z. Pomper	Z. Manojlović	4:17
3.	"Imam snage" ("I Have the Strength")	M. Arsenić	G. Manojlović	2:56
4.	"Borba" ("The Fight")	Z. Manojlović	G. Manojlović	4:27
5.	"Sutra može biti kiše" ("It Might Rain Tomorrow")	M. Arsenić	Z. Manojlović	3:47
6.	"Misli" ("Thoughts")	Z. Manojlović	Z. Manojlović	6:18
7.	"Mr. Alkohol" ("Mr Alcohol")	Z. Manojlović	Z. Manojlović	3:23
8.	"Život" ("Life")	Z. Manojlović	Z. Manojlović	4:42
9.	"Odlazim u noć" ("I'm Leaving into the Night")	P. Vuković	Z. Manojlović	3:11
10.	"Jugoslavijo" ("(Oh,) Yugoslavia")	Z. Manojlović	Z. Manojlović	4:08

== Personnel ==
- Zlatko Manojlović - vocals, guitar, producer
- Goran Manojlović - vocals, keyboard
- Zdenko Pomper - bass guitar
- Stevan Milutinović - drums

=== Additional personnel ===
- Miro Bevc - sound engineer
- Aco Razbotnik - recorded by
- Kostja Gatnik - cover design

== Legacy ==
In 2015 Čovek album cover, designed by Kostja Gatnik, was ranked 85th on the list of 100 Greatest Album Covers of Yugoslav Rock published by web magazine Balkanrock.
