= Miško Plavi =

Serbian musician and composer

- Birth name: Milivoje Petrović
- Also known as: Miško Plavi
- Born: April 22, 1961 (age 64); Guča, PR Serbia, FPR Yugoslavia
- Genres: New wave; synth-pop; pop rock; power pop; rock; world music; jazz
- Occupations: Musician; composer
- Instruments: Guitar; bass guitar; keyboards; accordion
- Years active: Late 1970s–present
- Labels: Jugoton, PGP-RTB, Komuna, Jabup, PGP-RTS, 021, Croatia Records
- Formerly of: VIA Talas; D' Boys; Peđa D'Boy Band; Piloti; Ekatarina Velika; Đura i Mornari

Milivoje Petrović (Serbian Cyrillic: Миливоје Петровић; born 22 April 1961), better known under his stage name Miško Plavi (Serbian Cyrillic: Мишко Плави; Miško the Blonde) is a Serbian multi-instrumentalist and composer, currently based in Japan. In the region of former Yugoslavia, he is best known as a former member of popular rock bands VIA Talas, D' Boys, Piloti and Ekatarina Velika, whereas in Japan he gained popularity as an accordionist. As a solo artist, he has released five studio albums and two live albums of his compositions and covers, and has composed music for several feature films.

== Biography ==
=== Early career ===
Petrović was born in Guča on 22 April 1961. Moving to Belgrade, he started his musical career as a member of acoustic rock band Akustičarska Grupa (Acoustic Group).

=== VIA Talas (1981–1982) ===
In 1981, Petrović formed new wave band VIA Talas with vocalist Mira Mijatović and drummer Dušan Gerzić "Gera". In VIA Talas, Petrović played both guitar and bass guitar. With the band he recorded the songs "Hawai (Najljepši kraj)" ("Hawai (The Most Beautiful Landscape)") and "Lilihip (My Boy Lollipop)", released in 1981 on the prominent compilation album Artistička radna akcija (Artistic Work Action). He left the group in the autumn of 1982.

=== D' Boys and Peđa D'Boy Band (1982–1986) ===
Upon leaving VIA Talas, Petrović joined synth-pop band D' Boys, initially as bass guitarist, switching to guitar after the departure of guitarist Goran Vejvoda. He remained a member of the band until they split up in 1984, partaking in the recording of the band's debut album Ajd' se zezamo (Let's Fool Around, 1983) and their second album Muvanje (Hitting On, 1984). During his stint with Piloti, he released the song "Hemija" ("Chemistry") on the Volume 1 of prominent compilation album series Ventilator 202 Demo Top 10. After D' Boys disbanded, Petrović continued to collaborate with the band's frontman Peđa D'Boy as a member of his Peđa D'Boy Band. Petrović played on the group's only two albums, Avantura (Adventure, 1985) and Laku noć ti, mala (Goodnight, Baby, 1986). After Peđa D'Boy Band ended their activity in 1986, Petrović joined the band Fantazija (Fantasy).

=== Piloti (1986–1997) ===
After his short stint in Fantazija, Petrović joined pop rock band Piloti, initially as guitarist, taking the role of the band's guitarist and keyboardist after the departure of guitarist Safet Petrovac. With Piloti he recorded successful albums Osmeh letnje noći (A Midsummer Night Smile, 1988), Neka te Bog čuva za mene (May God Save You for Me, 1990), Zaboravljeni (The Forgotten Ones, 1993) and Dan koji prolazi zauvek (A Day which Is Passing Forever, 1996). He remained a member Piloti until the group's disbandment in 1997.

=== Ekatarina Velika (1990) ===
In 1990, during a hiatus in Piloti's activities, Petrović joined Ekatarina Velika as bass guitarist, performing with the band for a year.

=== Đura i Mornari (1997–2000) ===
In 1997, Petrović played the accordion on the album Mediteran (Mediterranean) by the band Đura i Mornari, which blended pop and world music. On the album cover he was credited as "special guest". Petrović took part in the recording of the band's second album Tropikalizam (Tropicalism), released in 2000, this time as a full-time member. Following his work with Đura i Mornari, Petrović dedicated himself to playing accordion.

=== Solo career (2000–present) ===
Petrović traveled to Japan in for the first time 2000. There he initially performed as a street musician. During the following years, he started performing different venues and eventually made a successful career.

In 2002, Petrović recorded a cover of Ekatarina Velika song "Anestezija" ("Anesthesia") for the tribute album Kao da je bilo nekad... (As If It Had Happened Once...), dedicated to Ekatarina Velika frontman Milan Mladenović. In 2003, he started his Miško Plavi Band, featuring Serbian musicians Goran Rakočević (bass guitar) and Feđa Franklin (percussion), Indian musician Akash Bhatt (tabla) and Israeli musician Ravid Kahalani (vocals). His albums Misko Plavi Music (2003), East Kissing West (2004), For Billy (2005) and Istok ljubi zapad (2008) featured his compositions and covers recorded with a number of collaborators in both Serbia and Japan. In 2011, he published the autobiographical book Planeta Japan (Planet of Japan), which was accompanied by the live album Live in Japan, recorded on performances held in Japan during June and July 2009. In 2012, he released the album Live in Belgrade, which was recorded on Petrović's 9 September 2011 performance at the Momin krug (Momo's Circle) festival, dedicated to writer Momo Kapor. The performance featured jazz keyboardist Vasil Hadžimanov and drummer Srđan Dunkić. With the two, Petrović, under the name Miško Plavi Trio, recorded his 2019 album Hiljadu osmeha (Thousand Smiles), featuring Ana Stanić as guest vocalist.

=== Film score composing ===
With pianist and composer Irina Dečermić, Petrović wrote music for three films directed by Dečermić's husband Jean-Marc Barr: Lovers (1999), Too Much Flesh (2000) and Being Light (2001). The music for the three films was released in France on soundtrack albums. He wrote music for Srđan Koljević's 2004 film The Red Colored Grey Truck and for Vladimir Momčilović's 2007 film Uvođenje u posao (Training for the Job).

=== Other activities ===
Petrović acted in Milan Živković's 1986 film Black Maria, portraying guitarist of the fictional band Zenit.

== Discography ==
=== With VIA Talas ===
==== Compilation appearances ====
"Hawai (Najljepši kraj)" / "Lilihip (My Boy Lollipop)" (Artistička radna akcija, 1981)

=== With D' Boys ===
==== Studio albums ====
- Ajd' se zezamo (1983)
- Muvanje (1984)

==== Singles ====
- "Mi smo D' Boys" / "Crne oči, plava ljubav" (1983)
- "Jugoslovenka" / "Florida (Mala moja ne plači)" (1984)

=== With Peđa D'Boy Band ===
==== Studio albums ====
- Avantura (1985)
- Laku noć ti, mala (1986)

=== With Piloti ===
==== Studio albums ====
- Osmeh letnje noći (1988)
- Neka te Bog čuva za mene (1990)
- Zaboravljeni (1993)
- Dan koji prolazi zauvek (1996)

=== With Đura i Mornari ===
==== Studio albums ====
- Mediteran (1997)
- Tropikalizam (2000)

=== Solo ===
==== Studio albums ====
- Misko Plavi Music (2001)
- East Kissing West (2004)
- For Billy (2005)
- Istok ljubi zapad (2008)
- Hiljadu poljubaca (2019)

==== Live albums ====
- Live in Japan (2011)
- Live in Belgrade (2012)

==== Compilation albums ====
- Super Best of Misko Plavi (2007)
- Život (2012)

== Bibliography ==
- Planeta Japan (2011)

== Filmography ==
Year	Title	Notes
1999	Lovers	Composer
2000	Too Much Flesh	Composer
2001	Being Light	Composer
2004	The Red Colored Grey Truck	Composer
2007	Uvođenje u posao	Composer
