= Kraljica smrti =

Studio album by Gordi
- Released: 1982
- Recorded: June 1982
- Studios: MS Studio, Belgrade
- Genres: Heavy metal; hard rock
- Length: 35:43
- Label: Jugoton
- Producer: Zlatko Manojlović

Gordi chronology
Pakleni trio (1982)	Kraljica smrti (1982)	Fenix (2024)

Professional ratings
Review scores
Source	Rating
Serbian Metal (2007 reissue review)	(favorable)

Kraljica smrti (trans. Queen of Death) is the fifth studio album by Yugoslav rock band Gordi, released in 1982. It would be the band's last studio album before the reformation of the band in 2024 and the release of their comeback album Fenix. All the songs were authored by Manojlović.

Kraljica smrti is the band's second heavy metal album, and is, alongside their previous album, Pakleni trio (Hell Trio), considered a milestone on the Yugoslav heavy metal scene. Gordi ended their activity two years after the album release, the band's leader Zlatko Manojlović starting a successful solo career.

== Track listing ==
All songs written by Zlatko Manojlović.

No.	Title	Length
1.	"Lova" ("Money")	4:52
2.	"Blefer" ("Bluffer")	2:45
3.	"Veštice, đavoli" ("Witches, Devils")	3:56
4.	"Ostani daleko" ("Stay Far Away")	2:57
5.	"Kraljica smrti" ("Queen of Death")	3:18
6.	"Ubica u bekstvu" ("Killer on the Run")	3:05
7.	"Druga strana sveta" ("Other Side of the World")	4:37
8.	"Dok si mlad" ("While You're Young")	3:49
9.	"Ana, Maja, Sanja, Tanja"	3:20
10.	"Samo još jedan broj" ("Just Another Number")	2:44

== Personnel ==
- Zlatko Manojlović - vocals, guitar, producer
- Slobodan Svrdlan - bass guitar
- Čedomir Petrović - drums

=== Additional personnel ===
- Rade Ercegovac - recorded by
- Veselin Maldaner - recording assistant
- Vojkan Potulić - artwork, graphic design

== 2007 reissue ==
Kraljica smrti was rereleased by Rock Express Records in 2007. The reissue featured video recordings of the songs "Lova", "Blefer" i "Veštice, đavoli" from a 1982 concert. It also featured digital photo gallery, band biography, lyrics and wallpaper.

== 2021 reissue ==
In 2021, Croatia Records released a Zlatko Manojlović box set entitled Od Daha do Gordih (From Dah to Gordi), featuring reissue of Kraljica smrti.

== Legacy ==
In 2021, the song "Veštice, đavoli" was ranked 90th on the list of 100 Greatest Yugoslav Hard & Heavy Anthems by web magazine Balkanrock.
