= Fenix (Gordi album) =

Studio album by Gordi
- Released: 12 April 2024
- Genre: Hard rock
- Length: 45:12
- Label: Croatia Records

Gordi chronology
Kraljica smrti (1982)	Fenix (2024)

Fenix is the sixth studio album by Serbian and Yugoslav rock band Gordi, released in 2024. Fenix is Gordi's first studio album released following the 2024 reformation of the band and their first release since their 1982 album Kraljica smrti.

== Background ==
Formed and led by guitarist and vocalist Zlatko Manojlović, Gordi initially performed progressive rock, turning towards heavy metal with their fourth studio album Pakleni trio (Hell Trio), released in 1981. Pakleni trio was followed by the 1982 album Kraljica smrti (Queen of Death), featuring similar NWOBHM-inspired heavy metal sound. The two albums are generally considered the band's most notable works and often described as milestones on the Yugoslav heavy metal scene. However, Gordi did not manage to maintain their popularity and ended their activity two years after the release of Kraljica smrti, the band's leader Zlatko Manojlović starting a successful solo career. In 2024, 40 years since the dissolution of the band, Zlatko Manojlović reformed Gordi with a group of young musicians. The new lineup featured, beside Zlatko Manojlović, his son Todor Manojlović (guitar, bass guitar), Marko Terlević (bass guitar), Dalibor "Dado" Marinković (drums) and Berislav "Bero" Blažević (keyboards). The new lineup recorded and released the band's comeback album Fenix. All the songs were authored by Manojlović.

== Track listing ==
All songs written by Zlatko Manojlović.

No.	Title	Length
1.	"Želim da se napijem" ("I Wanna Get Drunk")	4:09
2.	"Imaš samo jedan život" ("You've Got Only One Life")	4:43
3.	"Ozbiljno zezanje" ("Seriously Screwing Around")	4:22
4.	"Nema nas više" ("We're No More")	3:39
5.	"Ovo nije ljubavna pesma" ("This Is Not a Love Song")	3:57
6.	"Ispod kože svi smo krvavi" ("We're All Bloody Beneath the Skin")	3:41
7.	"Nema te" ("You're Gone")	4:36
8.	"Prolazi sve" ("Everything Ends")	3:55
9.	"Pokušaj da se setiš" ("Try to Remember")	4:04
10.	"Ljubav se ne kupuje" ("You Can't Buy Love")	4:08
11.	"Ovo će biti luda noć" ("This Is Going to Be a Crazy Night")	3:58

== Personnel ==
- Zlatko Manojlović - vocals, guitar, producer
- Todor Manojlović - guitar, bass guitar
- Marko Terlević - bass guitar
- Dalibor Marinković - drums
- Berislav Blažević - keyboards

=== Additional personnel ===
- Ana Luketin Fahrenwald - artwork
