= Peđa D'Boy =

Peđa D' Boy
- Born: Predrag Jovanović; 14 April 1950 (age 76); Kruševac, PR Serbia, FPR Yugoslavia
- Origin: Serbia
- Genres: Synth-pop; pop rock; pop
- Occupations: Vocalist, musician, songwriter
- Instruments: vocals, guitar
- Years active: 1967–present
- Labels: Brain, Jugoton, PGP-RTB, City Records
- Formerly of: Jane; D' Boys; Peđa D'Boy Band

Predrag Jovanović (Serbian Cyrillic: Предраг Јовановић, born 14 April 1950), better known by his stage name Peđa D'Boy, is a Serbian and Yugoslav musician, best known as the former frontman of the Yugoslav band D' Boys.

Jovanović started his musical career in the 1960s, as the vocalist for the Yugoslav band Lutalice. After living in France during the 1970s, he became the vocalist for the English-language German progressive/krautrock band Jane, recording one studio album with them. Upon his return to Yugoslavia in 1982, he formed D' Boys with Mihajlo "Miško" Mihajlovski. The group gained large mainstream popularity with their debut studio album Ajd' se zezamo. After the release of D' Boys second album, Mihajlovski left the band, so the rest of the group continued as Peđa D'Boy Band. After releasing two albums under this name, the group disbanded, Jovanović moving back to France soon after. He made his comeback upon his return to Serbia in 2006, releasing three solo albums since.

== Biography ==
=== Early career ===
During the 1960s, Jovanović was a vocalist for the band Lutalice (The Wanderers). He made a cameo appearance in Živojin Pavlović's 1967 film When I Am Dead and Gone. In the famous singing contest scene he is introduced as "Predrag Jovanović, young hippie from Kruševac", before proceeding to sing "I'm a Believer" by The Monkees. During the 1970s, he performed in cafes in France and spent some time on Goa beaches in India, where he performed with jazz and rock musicians from all over the world. During the 1970s, he owned a boutique of leather clothes at Ibiza, where he met members of the German progressive/krautrock band Jane, soon becoming their vocalist and rhythm guitarist. With Jane he recorded their 1980 self-titled album, containing the hit "Love Your Life".

=== D' Boys (1982–1984) ===
Upon his 1982 return to Belgrade, Jovanović decided to join the city's music scene. At a jam session held in Belgrade's Students' Cultural Center during the exhibition of the comic book artist Igor Kordej, he met Mihajlo "Miško" Mihajlovski, the two deciding to start a band together. They chose the name D' Boys (pronounced as The Boys), Jovanović adopting the alias Peđa D'Boy. D' Boys initially performed as a duo, attracting the attention of the audience and the media with their minimalist synth-pop songs about parties and girls. After frequent live appearances in Belgrade and the release of their debut record, the 7-inch single with the songs "Mi smo D' Boys" ("We Are D' Boys") and "Plave oči, crna ljubav" ("Blue Eyes, Dark Love"), the two were joined by guitarist Goran Vejvoda and multi-instrumentalist Miško Plavi, the new lineup of the band moving towards more rock-influenced sound.

The band achieved large commercial success with their debut studio album Ajd' se zezamo (Let's Fool Around), released in 1983. It was followed by the album Muvanje (Hitting On), released in 1984, bringing the band's biggest hit, "Jugoslovenka (Ljupka oko pupka)" ("Yugoslav Girl (Lovely Around Her Waist)"). However, after the album release and the band's concerts in Greece during the summer of 1984, Mihajlovski left the band, the rest of the group led by Peđa D'Boy changing their name to Peđa D'Boy Band.

=== Peđa D'Boy Band (1984–1986) ===
Peđa D'Boy Band, consisting of former D' Boys members Peđa D'Boy (vocals), Miško Plavi (guitar), Jean-Jacques Roscam (guitar), Dragan "Gagi" Ilić (bass guitar), and Zoran "Cole" Miljuš (drums), released the album Avantura (Adventure) in the autumn of 1985. The album was produced by Peđa D'Boy and Boban Petrović. The video recorded for the song "Visibabe, ljubičice" ("Snowdrops, Violets") was banned from Yugoslav television due to its erotic imagery. In 1985, Peđa D'Boy took part in YU Rock Misija, the Yugoslav contribution to Live Aid, providing the vocals for the charity song "Za milion godina", and Peđa D'Boy Band performed on the corresponding charity concert, held on Red Star Stadium on 15 June 1985. During the same year, Peđa D'Boy represented Yugoslavia at the Song of Mediterranean festival in Palermo, winning the second place with "Jugoslovenka", and sang in the duet "Bubi" with Bilja Krstić, released on her album Iz unutrašnjeg džepa (From the Inner Pocket). Soon after, Jean-Jacques Roscam left the band to join Galija, while Dragan Ilić died of complications caused by gastric ulcer operation.

In 1986, Peđa D'Boy Band released the album Laku noć ti, mala (Goodnight, Baby), produced by Kornelije Kovač, who also composed four songs for the album. Beside Peđa D'Boy, Miško Plavi and Zoran Miljuš, the album featured Kornelije Kovač and Boban Petrović on keyboards, Dragan Jovanović and Srđan Miodragović on guitar and Ivan Švager on saxophone. The song "Šta da radim s rukama" ("What Should I Do with My Hands") featured guest appearance by actor Ratko Tankosić. After the album release, the band went on a short tour across Greece with Riblja Čorba and Galija, after which they ended their activity.

Peđa D'Boy performed briefly as a solo artist. He appeared at the 1986 MESAM festival with the song "Mrzim da spavam sam" ("I Hate Sleeping Alone"), and at the end of the year he moved back to France.

=== Comeback (2006–present) ===
Peđa D'Boy made a brief appearance in Belgrade in 1992, only to perform at a retro concert of Yugoslav pop and rock music held in Belgrade Youth Center. In 1997, in London, he recorded some new material, produced by Mark Evans, including a remix of "Jugoslovenka". The material was published on an EP, but was not promoted on live appearances.

He returned to Serbia in 2006, having his comeback appearance as a guest at Delča i Sklekovi concert in Belgrade Youth Center. He continued to perform and record as a solo artist, backed by the group Polyester Shock. In 2006, he released the EP with the song "Beograđanka", a new version of "'Ajd se zezamo", and a French language version of "Jugoslovenka", entitled "La fille Yougoslavie". He released his comeback album General in 2008, followed by 2010 album 72-3 and the 2014 album Moj put / Paranemija (My Way / Paranaemia), all featuring new songs alongside new versions of old songs.

=== Other activities ===
He participated in the Big Brother VIP reality show and acted in Vladimir Rajčić's 2009 film Serbian Scars.

== Discography ==
=== With Jane ===
- Jane (Brain, 1980)

=== With D'Boys ===
==== Studio albums ====
- Ajd' se zezamo (1983)
- Muvanje (1984)

==== Singles ====
- "Mi smo D'Boys" / "Crne oči, plava ljubav" (1983)

=== With Peđa D'Boy Band ===
- Avantura (1985)
- Laku noć ti, mala (1986)

=== Solo ===
- General (2008)
- 72-3 (2010)
- Moj put / Paranemija (2014)
