= Pakleni trio =

Studio album by Gordi
- Released: 1981
- Recorded: July 1981
- Studios: MS Studio, Belgrade
- Genres: Heavy metal; hard rock
- Length: 31:33
- Label: Jugoton

Gordi chronology
Gordi 3 (1981)	Pakleni trio (1981)	Kraljica smrti (1982)

Professional ratings
Review scores
Source	Rating
Serbian Metal (2006 reissue review)	(favorable)

Pakleni trio (trans. Hell Trio) is the fourth studio album by Yugoslav rock band Gordi, released in 1981. Pakleni trio was the band's first album to feature a heavy metal sound, for which Gordi are mostly remembered.

== Background ==
Gordi started their career in the late 1970s, with their first three albums being progressive/hard rock oriented. After the band's third studio album, Gordi 3, keyboardist Goran Manojlović, brother of Gordi frontman and leader Zlatko Manojlović, left the band, Gordi continuing as a power trio. In 1981 the band released Pakleni trio. Heavily influenced by the new wave of British heavy metal, Pakleni trio marked a shift in the band's musical direction and is today considered a milestone in the Yugoslav heavy metal scene.

== 2006 reissue ==
Pakleni trio was rereleased by Rock Express Records in 2006. The album reissue featured two bonus tracks, "Duga noć" ("Long Night") and "Idi sad" ("Go Now"), from a 7-inch single Gordi released in 1978. The reissue also featured video recordings of the songs "Igraj, luduj", "Ona je žena" and "Tebi ne treba niko" from a 1982 concert by the band, as well as a video recording of Zlatko Manojlović's 2005 concert in Germany.

== 2021 reissue ==
In 2021, Croatia Records released a Zlatko Manojlović box set entitled Od Daha do Gordih (From Dah to Gordi), featuring reissue of Pakleni trio.

== Track listing ==
All songs written by Zlatko Manojlović.

No.	Title	Length
1.	"Put do pakla" ("Road to Hell")	3:48
2.	"Igraj, luduj" ("Dance, Go Crazy")	3:08
3.	"Volim" ("I Love")	4:03
4.	"Ona i ja" ("She and I")	3:37
5.	"Tebi ne treba niko" ("You Don't Need Anyone")	3:10
6.	"Naivna Venera" ("Naive Venus")	3:30
7.	"Strašna riba izdaleka" ("Great Chick from Far Away")	3:18
8.	"Ona je žena" ("She's a Woman")	4:38
9.	"San" ("A Dream")	2:21

2006 reissue bonus tracks
No.	Title	Length
10.	"Duga noć" ("Long Night")	2:31
11.	"Idi sad" ("Go Now")	4:35

== Personnel ==
- Zlatko Manojlović – guitar, vocals, producer
- Slobodan Svrdlan – bass guitar, vocals
- Čedomir Petrović – drums, vocals

=== Additional personnel ===
- Rade Ercegovac - recorded by
- Jugoslav Vlahović - artwork, photography, graphic design
- Boško Boroš - photography

== Legacy ==
In 2021, the songs "Put do pakla", "Tebi ne treba niko" and "Igraj luduj" were ranked 25th, 74th and 80th respectively on the list of 100 Greatest Yugoslav Hard & Heavy Anthems by web magazine Balkanrock.
