= Ruž =

Serbian pop rock band

- The 1993-1995 Ruž lineup, from left to right: Dejan Grujić, Vuk Rosandić, and Zoran Tomašević.

Background information
- Origin: Belgrade, Serbia
- Genres: Pop rock
- Years active: 1982 – 1995
- Labels: Jugoton, PGP-RTB, ZAM, PGP-RTS,
- Past members: Vuk Rosandić; Miloš Kozić; Marko Kozić; Zoran Tomašević; Dejan Grujić

Ruž (Serbian Cyrillic: Руж; trans. Rouge) was a Serbian and Yugoslav pop rock band from Belgrade.

== History ==
The band was formed in 1982 and went through numerous lineup changes before a steady lineup was formed: Vuk Rosandić (vocals), twin brothers Miloš (guitar) and Marko Kozić (bass guitar), and Zoran Tomašević "Toma" (drums). Soon, the record label Jugoton showed interest in signing a contract with them. Ruž appeared on the scene when the popularity of teen idols Plavi Orkestar declined, and Ruž won part of Plavi Orkestar's audience. Ruž's debut album Još jedan ples, released in 1988, became a golden record. The album was produced by Ivan Fece "Firči", and featured Marina Perazić on backing vocals, Jovan Maljoković on saxophone, Aleksandar Dujin on keyboards, and Zoran Bulatović "Bale" on bass guitar. All the songs on the album were composed by Miloš Kozić, and the album's main hit was "Zubarka" ("Girl Dentist").

The band's second album, Noćno kupanje (Night Swimming), released in 1990, should have been released by Jugoton, but the band moved to PGP-RTB because of the tensed situation in the country. The album was produced by Đorđe Petrović, and featured Dragan Jovanović on guitar, Feldi Jen on saxophone, Szabo Robert on banjo and harmonica and Kristina and Aleksandra Kovač on backing vocals. Noćno kupanje brought hits "Nemica" ("German Girl") and "Amerikanka" ("American Girl"). The band saw huge success with the album and became teen idols over night. With the concert at Belgrade's Sajmište the band caused hysteria among teenage girls. The band held a tour across Serbia, Bosnia and Herzegovina and Macedonia, during which they played about 120 concerts. In 1991, at the Belgrade Spring Festival, they performed a cover of Pro Arte song "Jedna mala plava" ("One Blond Little Girl"). The song was released on the album Beograde - Hitovi beogradskog proleća. As Yugoslav Wars began, Rosandić moved to London, and later to the United States.

In 1992, the band, without Rosandić, released the album Čuvari ljubavi (Guardians of Love). The album was produced by Saša Habić, and featured Dragan Jovanović on guitar, Nikola Vranjković on guitar, Saša Lokner on keyboards and Jelena Galonjić on backing vocals. The album featured the hit "Ima nešto u tvojim očima" ("There's Something in Your Eyes"). After the album release, the Kozić brothers, with vocalist Daniel Vuletić, formed the band Čuvari Ljubavi, and released their self-titled album in 1993. At the about same time, Rosandić returned to the country. He and Tomašević, with the bass guitarist Dejan Grujić (formerly of Čutura i Oblaci), continued to work as Ruž. In 1993 they released the album Nº 4. The album was produced by Zlatko Manojlović, most of the songs were composed by him, and the album also featured a cover of "Šošana", old hit by Manojlović's band Dah.

In 1995, Ruž released the album Kao nekada... (Just like Before...). The album was produced by Đorđe Petrović. The songs were written by Grujić, Kozić brothers, and Zana members Zoran Živanović and Radovan Jovićević. The album also featured a cover of Laki Pingvini song "Šizika", on which former Laki Pngvini singer Đorđe Dragojlović made a guest appearance. Other guest appearances included Saša Ranđelović on guitar and Dejan Grujić's brother Darko on keyboards. Soon after the album was released, Rosandić moved to the United States, and Ruž disbanded.

=== Post breakup ===
After he left Ruž, Miloš Kozić worked with pop singers Maja Odžaklijevska and Goca Tržan. During the 1990s, Tomašević hosted the show YU Top 10 at TV Pink, and for a short time worked in the record company City Records as marketing director. He moved to the United States in 2001. At the beginning of the 2000s, Grujić joined Irish folk/Celtic rock band Orthodox Celts. In 2003, Rosandić released the solo album Trajem (I Continue), retiring from the scene shortly after.

== Discography ==
=== Studio albums ===
- Još jedan ples (1988)
- Noćno kupanje (1990)
- Čuvari ljubavi (1992)
- Nº 4 (1993)
- Kao nekada... (1995)
