= Marko Janković (journalist) =

Serbian journalist (1947–2023)

- Марко Јанковић
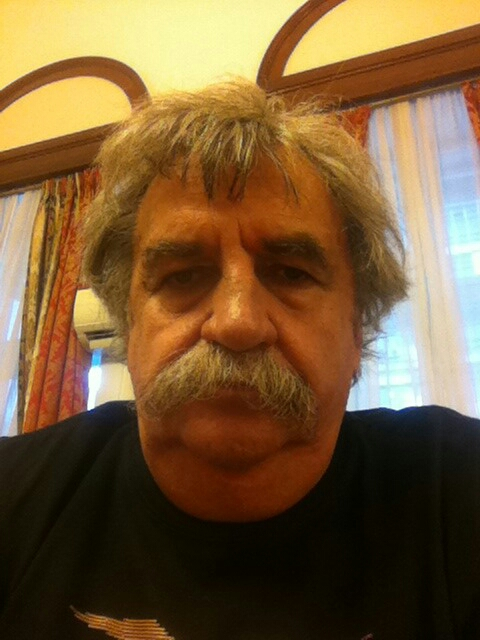
- Born: 2 July 1947; Kragujevac, PR Serbia, FPR Yugoslavia
- Died: 17 January 2023 (aged 75); Belgrade, Serbia
- Education: University of Belgrade
- Occupations: Journalist; politician; disc jockey; radio and television presenter
- Political party: DS (1990–1992); DSS (1992–1995)
- Children: 2

Marko Janković (Serbian Cyrillic: Марко Јанковић; 2 July 1947 – 17 January 2023) was a Serbian journalist, politician, disc jockey, and radio and television presenter. He was one of the founders of the Democratic Party and a prominent presenter on RTV Studio B, which he co-founded.

== Early life ==
Marko Janković was born on 2 July 1947 in Kragujevac, Socialist Republic of Serbia, Federal People's Republic of Yugoslavia. His father, Mitar, was a lawyer while his mother worked as a teacher. His paternal grandfather was born in Grabovica near Šavnik. He finished primary school and gymnasium in Kragujevac. While in Belgrade he studied at the Faculty of Mathematics of the University of Belgrade.

== Career ==
In his early career, Janković was a swimming coach and a disc jockey at the "Crveno i crno" (Red and black) club in Belgrade.

=== Journalism ===
He later began working as a journalist, founding the Studio B radio and television broadcaster in 1970. Initially, he worked as a music associate, later becoming a radio and television presenter. He was the author and host of various radio shows, such as Od doručka do ručka (From breakfast to lunch), Pingvin and Index. Beginning in 1979, he hosted Pop Ekspres, a music show, on Yugoslav Radio Television. He was one of the most known presenters on Studio B, before being suspended. After leaving Studio B, he unsuccessfully sued the broadcaster. During the overthrow of Slobodan Milošević, he broke into the Studio B building.

He wrote for the Grom newspaper. In 2005, he began working on radio Fokus.

=== Politics ===
Janković was one of the founding members of the Democratic Party (DS), being one of the original thirteen signatories of the proclamation of the foundation of DS. After the establishment, his view shifted to the right-wing. After DS voted to not join the Democratic Movement of Serbia coalition in 1992, he joined Vojislav Koštunica and became one of the founders of the Democratic Party of Serbia (DSS). As a member of DSS, he was critical of Koštunica's personnel policy and he ultimately decided to leave DSS in 1995. He soon grew closer to the Christian Democratic Party of Serbia, though he never became its member.

In 2010, he was one of the signatories that was opposed to the holding of a pride parade. He voiced his support for Koštunica and DSS in the 2012 parliamentary election. In 2014, Janković accepted the proposal to become Dveri's mayoral candidate in the 2014 Belgrade City Assembly election. Dveri did not end up winning any seats.

== Political positions ==
Janković was an anti-communist and a critic of atheism and Slobodan Milošević. According to him, nationalism is "the healthy love towards your nation and it does not collide with cosmopolitanism". He later became a critic of Aleksandar Vučić and reality television.

== Personal life ==
Janković identified as a Serb. He was married and had two children. He was a fan of rock music.

He died on 17 January 2023, at the age of 75. He was buried at the New Bežanija Cemetery three days later.
