= Zlatko Manojlović =

Serbian and Yugoslav guitarist and singer (born 1951)

- Also known as: Zed Mitchell
- Born: 1951 (age 74–75); Kruševac, PR Serbia, FPR Yugoslavia
- Genres: Rock; progressive rock; hard rock; heavy metal; instrumental rock; jazz fusion; blues; pop
- Occupations: Guitarist; keyboardist; singer; songwriter; music producer
- Instruments: Guitar; keyboards; vocals
- Years active: 1966–present
- Labels: Jugoton, Studio B, Polydor Records, Jupiter Records, Diskos, ZKP RTLJ, PGP-RTB, Jugoton, Toshiba EMI, White Dog Production, PGP-RTS, City Records, Psycho Sound Records, Vox Music, SPV GmbH, Z-Records, Croatia Records
- Formerly of: Džentlmeni; Dah; Vox
- Website: www.zedmitchell.com

Zlatko Manojlović (Serbian Cyrillic: Златко Манојловић; born 1951), also known internationally as Zed Mitchell, is a Serbian and Yugoslav guitarist, vocalist and songwriter, currently based in Germany.

Manojlović rose to prominence in the late 1960s, when he joined the already established rock band Džentlmeni. After Džentlemni disbanded, he formed the short-lived band Fleš, and in 1972, he formed the progressive rock Dah, which achieved international success with their hit "Shoshana", disbanding in 1976. In 1977, he formed Gordi, initially a progressive rock and hard rock band, which moved to heavy metal with their final two albums.

Simultaneously with leading Dah and Gordi, Manojlović recorded several solo releases. His debut solo release was the 1975 single "Ko te sada ljubi". His 1976 solo single "Jednoj ženi" achieved nationwide success. He released his first solo album Zlatko i njegove gitare in 1980. After the international success of his album Jednoj ženi, he moved to Germany, releasing a number of albums of instrumental music and cooperating with a number of prominent artists. With his wife Izolda Barudžija he started the musical duo Vox, recording two albums. In 2024, he reformed Gordi, the new lineup featuring his son Todor Manojlović.

== Career ==
=== Early career (1966–1972) ===
Manojlović started his musical career when he was very young. He was only fifteen when he sang his song "Prolazim" ("I'm Passing") in Radio Belgrade competition show Studio VI vam pruža šansu (Studio VI Offers You a Chance), winning first place.

In 1969, Branislav Marušić "Čutura" invited him to become the guitarist for the reformed Džentlmeni. After Džentlmeni disbanded in 1972, he formed the short-lived band Fleš (Flash), with which he recorded one 7-inch single, featuring the songs "Ne laži draga" ("Don't Lie, Darling") and "Svet bez ljubavi" ("World Without Love"), released in 1972.

=== Dah (1972–76) ===
In 1972, Manojlović and Marušić formed the band progressive rock Dah. After recording only one 7-inch single with Dah, Marušić left the group, so Manojlović took over vocal duties in addition to playing guitar. The band gained large success with their debut album Veliki cirkus (The Big Circus), released in 1974. In 1975, the band moved to Belgium, where they changed their name to Land. After spending a year in Belgium and having international success with their hit song "Shoshana", the band moved back to Yugoslavia, releasing the album Povratak (The Return) in 1976. After the release of the album, Zlatko Manojlović went to serve his mandatory stint in the Yugoslav army, his brother, keyboardist Goran Manojlović, taking over leading of Dah, the group disbanding in 1977.

=== Gordi (1977–1984, 2024) ===
Upon his return from the army in November 1977, Manojlović formed the band Gordi. After releasing three progreesive/hard rock-oriented albums, Čovek (A Man, 1978), Gordi 2 (1979) and Gordi 3 (1979), the band made a shift towards heavy metal with the album Pakleni trio (Hell Trio, 1981). The band released another heavy metal album, Kraljica smrti (Queen of Death, 1982), before disbanding in 1984.

In 2024, Manojlović reformed Gordi, the new lineup featuring his son Todor Manojlović. The reformed Gordi released the group's comeback, mostly hard rock-oriented album Fenix.

=== Solo career (1975–present) ===
Manojlović started his solo career in 1975, while he was still leading of Dah, with the 7-inch single featuring the songs "Ko te sada ljubi" ("Who Kisses You Now") and "Osećanja" ("Feelings"). In 1976, while serving the Yugoslav People's Army in Ljubljana, he recorded the double 7-inch single entitled Ona je (She Is), featuring the instrumental "Jednoj ženi" ("To a Woman"), which saw large airplay in Yugoslavia. On the single recording, Manojlović played guitar and bass guitar, and Slovenian musicians Dare Petrič (guitar), Vlado Špindler (bass guitar), Andrej Petkovič (drums), Andrej Konjajev (keyboards) and Žare Prinčić (keyboards) also took part in the recording.

Manojlović released his debut album Zlatko i njegove gitare (Zlatko and His Guitars) in 1980, while still leading Gordi. The album featured eight instrumentals composed by Manojlović and a version of Django Reinhardt's composition "Nuages". Themes on the album varied from Latin music, over Balkan folk-inspired themes, to funk. During the same year, he recorded the instrumental version of the song "Bilećanka" for the various artists album of youth work actions songs O'ruk generacija (Hi-Ho Generation). In 1983, he released his second solo album Jednoj ženi, on which he was accompanied by former Smak members Dragan Stojanović "Kepa" (drums) and Zoran Milanović (bass guitar). The album gained attention of the representatives of Toshiba EMI at the 1983 MIDEM, and the label released the album in Japan under the title To One Woman, as a part of its Nexus edition. After the Japanese release, the album appeared in other markets.

In 1984, Manojlović left Yugoslavia and went abroad, participating in the recording of about fifty albums, although remaining mostly uncredited. In 1986, he released the English language album Zlatko. In 1994, he released the album Blue Heart for the German market. The album Zlatko, released in Serbia in 1995, featured, beside his own songs—including a new version of "Jednoj ženi"—covers of The Beatles' "Strawberry Fields Forever", Chick Corea's "Spain", Mason Williams's "Classical Gas", Frank Sinatra's "My Way", Bonnie Tyler's "The Best" 10cc's "I'm Not in Love", and Derek and the Dominos' "Layla". Five tracks on the album were recorded with Munich Symphony Orchestra. In 1997, he released another album entitled Zlatko, featuring mostly instrumental tracks, but also the songs "O.K. Let's Do It" and "Lone Star", featuring Manojlović's wife Izolda Barudžija on vocals. The 1999 album Terra Futura and 2006 album Pure Life featured his instrumentals.

Under the name Zed Mitchell and with the backing band The Zodiacs, he recorded the blues rock album Springtime in Paris, released in 2010. The album featured his compositions with lyrics authored by Winifred Dulisch. It was followed by the albums Summer in L.A. (2010), Game Is On (2011), Autumn in Berlin (2013) and Winter in Amsterdam (2016). In 2018, he released the album WOW. In Serbia, the songs from WOW were released with Serbian language-lyrics on the album Crni labud (Black Swan), with title tracks from his "Four Seasons" tetralogy as bonus tracks. In 2020, he released the blues-oriented album Route 69, featuring his son Todor Manojlović on guitar. In 2021, Croatia Records released the four-piece box set Od Daha do Gordih (From Dah to Gordi), featuring Dah album Veliki cirkus, Gordi albums Pakleni trio and Kraljica smrti and a CD with the selection of Manojlović's solo works. ManOjlović's latest album, HA, HA, HA, HA..., released in 2022, features both himself and Todor Manojlović on guitar and keyboards.

=== Vox (1996–1998) ===
In 1996, Manojlović and his wife Izolda Barudžija, under the name Vox, released the album of the same title. Manojlović wrote the music, while the lyrics were written by both of them. In 1998, they released the album Vox, featuring mostly ballads, with some songs on the album featuring Manojlović playing sitar.

=== Collaborations and guest appearances ===
Manojlović played guitar on the 1986 album Igre slobode (Games of Freedom) by the Yugoslav synth-pop band Amila. He took part in the recording of the 1991 album The Sensation Of Sound – Pop Goes Classic Vol. 5 – Guitar Classics by Munich Symphonic Sound Orchestra. He took part in the recording of Cabaret Balkan soundtrack, composed by Zoran Simjanović. He played guitar on Eros Ramazzotti's 1988 mini album Musica è (Music Is).

Manojlović appeared as guest on Opus' 1975 album Opus 1, as vocalist in the song "Memento Mori", Oko's 1976 album Raskorak (Gap), as vocalist in the song "Sam sam" ("I'm Alone"), and Kozmetika's 1983 self-titled album, as guitarist in the song "Ona hoće sve da zna" ("She Wants to Know Everything").

=== Production ===
Beside all the albums by Gordi and most of his solo releases, Manojlović has also produced Galija album Druga plovidba (1980) and Ruž album Nº 4 (1993), also authoring most of the songs on the latter.

== Family ==
Manojlović's brother Goran Manojlović is a keyboardist. He was a member of the 1975-1977 Dah lineup, and the 1977–1981 Gordi lineup.

Manojlović is married to singer Izolda Barudžija, a former member of the girl group Aske. Their son Todor Manojlović is also a guitarist. He took part in the recording of Zlatko Manojlović's albums WOW, Route 69 and HA, HA, HA, HA..., and is the member of the reformed Gordi and the band Amid Falls.

== Discography ==
=== With Fleš ===
==== Singles ====
- "Ne laži, draga" / "Svet bez ljubavi" (1972)

=== With Dah ===
==== Studio albums ====
- Veliki cirkus (1974)
- Povratak (1976)

==== Singles ====
- "Ako poželiš" / "Noćna buka" (1973)
- "Samo jedna noć" / "Cvrčak" (1973)
- "Gitareska" / "Ti si ta" (1974)
- "Mali princ" / "Ime" (1974)
- "Šošana" / "Please, Don't Say Nothing" (as Land, 1975)
- "Žeđ" / "Misli" (1976)
- "Tomorrow" / "Under The Sky" (as Land 1977)

=== With Gordi ===
==== Studio albums ====
- Čovek (1978)
- Gordi 2 (1979)
- Gordi 3 (1979)
- Pakleni trio (1981)
- Kraljica smrti (1982)
- Fenix (2024)

==== Singles ====
- "Duga noć" / "Idi sad" (1978)

=== With Vox ===
==== Studio albums ====
- Vox (1996)
- Vox (1998)

=== Solo ===
==== Studio albums ====
- Zlatko i njegove gitare (1980)
- Zlatko (1982)
- Jednoj ženi (1983)
- Zlatko (1986)
- Blue Heart (1994)
- Zlatko (1995)
- Zlatko (1997)
- Terra Futura (1999)
- Pure Life (2006)
- Springtime in Paris (2010)
- Summer in L.A. (2010)
- Autumn in Berlin (2013)
- Winter in Amsterdam (2016)
- WOW (2018)
- Crni labud (2019)
- Route 69 (2020)
- HA, HA, HA, HA... (2022)

==== Live albums ====
- Live (2016)

==== Box sets ====
- Od Daha do Gordih (2021)

==== Singles ====
- "Ko te sada ljubi" / "Osećanja" (1975)
- Ona je (double 7-inch, 1977)
- "Tvoja pesma" / "U sumrak" (1978)
- "Moja Srbijo, moja Jugoslavijo" / "Idemo dalje" (With Izolda Barudžija, 2000)
