= Gordi 3 =

Studio album by Gordi
- Released: 1981
- Recorded: January 1981
- Studios: PGP-RTB Studio V, Belgrade
- Genres: Hard rock; progressive rock; pop rock
- Length: 31:23
- Label: PGP-RTB
- Producer: Zlatko Manojlović

Gordi chronology
Gordi 2 (1979)	Gordi 3 (1981)	Pakleni trio (1981)

Gordi 3 (stylized as Gordi III on the cover) is the third studio album by Yugoslav rock band Gordi, released in 1981. Gordi 3 is the band's last progressive/hard rock-oriented album before their switch to heavy metal with the album Pakleni trio (Hell Trio).

Gordi 3 is the band's first studio album recorded with drummer Čedomir "Čeda" Petrović and the band's only studio album recorded with bass guitarist Zoran Bartulović. It is also the band's last album to feature keyboardist Goran Manojlović, who left the band after the album release. After Goran Manojlović's departure, Gordi would continue their career as a power trio.

The song "Greh" ("Sin") features lyrics written by poet and lyricist Duško Trifunović.

== Track listing ==
All songs written by Zlatko Manojlović, except where noted.

No.	Title	Lyrics	Music	Length
1.	"Pomozi nam" ("Help Us")			3:15
2.	"Goospođa Mileva" ("Madame Mileva")	Goran Manojlović	Goran Manojlović	2:17
3.	"TV rob" ("TV Slave")			3:55
4.	"Haos u radio mreži" ("Chaos in Radio Network")			3:06
5.	"Stari as" ("Old Ace")			3:09
6.	"Lutka" ("Doll")			3:35
7.	"Greh" ("Sin")	Duško Trifunović	Zlatko Manojlović	3:20
8.	"Ponekad sretnem bivšu ljubav" ("Sometimes I Meet My Old Love")			5:00
9.	"Lolita"			3:54

== Personnel ==
- Zlatko Manojlović - vocals, guitar, producer
- Goran Manojlović - keyboard, vocals
- Zoran Bartulović - bass guitar
- Čedomir Petrović - drums

=== Additional personnel ===
- Ivan Ćulum - design
