= White Rabbit Band =

Yugoslavian/Serbian band

White Rabbit Band is a psychedelic post-punk band created in 1982 in Belgrade, former Yugoslavia (now Serbia).

== History (1982–1987) ==
The band was formed by Draško "Drakula" Nikodijević, original member and former bass player Igra Staklenih Perli and young and prospective female drummer Snow White. They gathered as a team to contribute a theater show "Alice in Wonderland" by young director Ištvan Lalić. The theater show never happened but the band added young female bass player Maya Papović and started touring.

With just a couple of demo tapes floating around, in the period of 1983 to 1987, the band as the part of new wave music scene in Yugoslavia, generated close to 100 live appearances, mostly in Belgrade, but also in Zagreb, Novi Sad, Sarajevo, Subotica, Niš, Rijeka, Vinkovci and other cities in the former Yugoslavia. The band was frequently seen on TV in 1986 and their single "1986!" was No. 5 on Sloba Konjovic's "Domestic top 10" list for 1986 on Studio B in Belgrade. The band played live along with many famous Yugoslav and European bands, like Električni Orgazam in Niš and famous English Crust punk/Heavy pioneers Amebix in Sarajevo in 1986.

During the 80s many musicians passed through the band: former Igra Staklenih Perli Vojkan Rakić on guitar, Thrile and Griša on bass and Borko Petrović on drums.

After relocating in late 80's to New York, Nikodijević released a conceptual album there under the name "White Rabbit Cult" in 1999 and it was more industrial sample based music.

== Reunion ==
White Rabbit Band has risen again in September 2013 with Nikodijević on bass and vocals, former Igra Staklenih Perli TNG, Električni Orgazam and Partibrejkers member Vlada Funtek on drums and guitarist Andrija Babović. With a new wave of energy and new loud shamanic vibration they released two new singles "The Jungle" and "Love will heal the pain". After couple of months Funtek left the band and was replaced with former Baby Kate and Partibrejkers drummer Borko Petrović who played shortly in White Rabbit Band before the breakup in 1987.

In new formation, the band recorded several new songs. Band publicly supports legalization of medical cannabis and together with guests Dejan Stanisavljević from the Beograd and Romana & Bojan Slačala from Artan Lili, recorded the song "Lekalizujte (Legalize it)", written by Nikodijević. The first live performance of the song was on Medi-Cana Fest in Belgrade in May 2015.

In May 2016 the band presented new drummer Aleksandar Andrejević for the upcoming HUNGER AID SERBIA 2016 TOUR.
