= Gordi 2 =

Album by Gordi

Studio album by Gordi
- Released: 1979
- Studio: PGP-RTB Studio V, Belgrade
- Genre: Progressive rock; hard rock
- Length: 32:11
- Label: PGP-RTB
- Producer: Zlatko Manojlović

Gordi chronology
Čovek (1978)	Gordi 2 (1979)	Gordi 3 (1981)

Gordi 2 is the second studio album released by Yugoslav rock band Gordi, released in 1979.

Gordi 2 is the band's last album to feature drummer Stevan Milutinović, who was replaced by Čedomir "Čeda" Petrović for the band's third studio album, Gordi 3.

The closing track on the album, instrumental "Uspavanka" ("Lullaby"), was dedicated to Gordi leader Zlatko Manojlović's son Miloš.

== Track listing ==
All songs written by Zlatko Manojlović.

No.	Title	Length
1.	"Ovog leta idem na more" ("I'm Going to the Seaside This Summer")	3:01
2.	"Zašto si s njim" ("Why Are You With Him")	2:57
3.	"Rock 'n' roll sa juga" ("Southern Rock 'n' Roll")	2:06
4.	"Sportska pesma" ("Sport Song")	2:31
5.	"Kišni dan sa tobom" ("A Rainy Day with You")	4:04
6.	"Pecaroš" ("Fisherman")	3:35
7.	"Otmičar" ("Kidnapper")	3:45
8.	"Gitareska" ("Guitaresque")	3:46
9.	"Baci tu cigaru" ("Throw Away That Cigar")	2:54
10.	"Uspavanka" ("Lullaby")	3:32

== Personnel ==
- Zlatko Manojlović – vocals, guitar, producer
- Goran Manojlović – keyboard, flute, vocals (on track 4)
- Slobodan Svrdlan – bass guitar
- Stevan Milutinović – drums, percussion, vocals (on track 7)

=== Additional personnel ===
- Petar Gaković - engineer
- Milenko Miletić - graphic design
- Milan Đurica - photograph
