= Milorad Roganović =

Serbian journalist (born 1951)

Milorad Roganović (born 1951) is a journalist and graduated sociology professor.

== Biography ==
Roganović was born in 1951 in Belgrade, where he finished elementary and high school. In 1977, he graduated at the group for philosophy and sociology of the University of Belgrade Faculty of Philosophy. He started practising journalism in 1975. as a member of editorial staff in youth magazines "Youth", "Youth Newspaper" and "The Student".

He became a member of staff of the first radio station outside of the radio-diffusion system of Serbia – Studio B in early 1977. From a journalist-contributor, over the position of editor, editor-in-chief, host of numerous popular TV and radio talk shows, he built a career of a professional and independent journalist. Starting with 1989. he's deputy general manager and program director of Studio B (which then consisted of three radio channels, the first transmitted 24 hrs a day informative news program, the second – ethno-music and news, and the third – 12 hrs a day of classical music). In the same year he became one of the founders and owners of the first independent television station in Eastern Europe, NTV Studio B, which was shut down by police on March 28, 1990, after just one hour of program transmission. In November the same year, NTV Studio B started broadcasting the program, in spite of all government resistance. It was the most quoted source of information in the European media during that period. Mr. Roganović still performed the function of program director of radio and television and deputy general manager of the firm. In May 1995, he became the general manager and editor-in-chief of all TV and radio programs. Following the orders of Slobodan Milošević in 1996, the police stormed the Studio B, dismissed the entire news staff, fired the management and turned the then private firm NTV Studio B into a government firm, which Studio B remains even today (the district court still handles the process of returning the company to its prior owners). Roganović was, in the meantime, as the governments changed, three times fired and taken back to work.

Currently he performs the duties of editor-in-chief of the radio Studio B. Milorad Roganovic finished radio and TV management courses in Thessaloniki and London. He participated specialist seminars about local and private television in Leedscastle, Thessaloniki. He also participated in specialist seminars about the influence ad role of the European Council in Strasbourg. He was a guest of the US government informative centre for a month and a half, touring various parts of the US and studying independent media and freedom of the press. He had shorter studying trips to France, Germany, Great Britain, etc. He is the author of a series of radio and TV interviews with the highest Yugoslavian and foreign statesmen. He is the winner of the greatest journalist awards in his company and in Serbia, a journalist who was in the last fifteen years interviewed and quoted in several dozen of greatest world magazines (the Washington Post, the New York Times, Yoshiro Shimbun). He is considered to be one of the greatest independent journalists in Serbia in the past decade. He's a member of the Journalist Society of Serbia (UNS) and the international Federation of Journalists with headquarters in Brussels, as well as European Journalists of Serbia (UENS). Roganovic is considered as one of the most prominent experts on the ethics of a word spoken in public, journalist professional codex and local media.

He was an associate of The Centre for Liberal-Democratic studies (CLDS) in Belgrade, and author of the project "Hate-mongering and words spoken in public - ethical problems", which was held in several cities in Serbia from January to May 2004.

Currently he is the editor and host of the radio political talk show, "Slučaj B" on Radio Studio B.

He has often stressed that all of his achievements he credits to bravery of his superior Mr.Dragan Kojadinovic whom he was honored to support as his deputy for all those years.

== Resources ==
- List of UENS members
- Homepage of the "Slučaj B" radio programme
