= Ivana Vučićević =

Serbian journalist and television presenter (born 1978)

- Ивана Вучићевић
- Born: 1978 (age 47–48); Belgrade, SR Serbia, SFR Yugoslavia
- Occupations: Journalist, television presenter
- Years active: 2000–present
- Employer: Studio B (2004–present)
- Known for: President of the ANS (2025–present)
- Television: Yu Channel; Channel D Studio B Informer TV

Ivana Vučićević (Serbian Cyrillic: Ивана Вучићевић; born 1978) is a Serbian journalist and television presenter. She serves as the director and editor-in-chief of Studio B and the president of the Association of Journalists of Serbia (Asocijacija novinara Srbije, ANS).

== Biography ==
She was born in 1978 in Belgrade. In her biography, she states that she has a degree in economics and journalism, and master's degree in the field of communicology.

She started her career as a journalist in 2000. At first, she worked on the Yu Channel and in Nedeljni telegraf, then she hosted a show on the children's Channel D.

Since 2004, he has been working in the newsroom of Studio B. First, she performed various journalistic tasks, then she hosted and edited news, as well as her own show, in order to get an author's show in which she spoke with experts in the field of medicine. She has hosted the show Belgrade, good day since 2008, later she was the editor and host of the show Belgrade, good evening.

She came to the position of director and editor-in-chief of Studio B in 2014 and has held that position until the present day. Since 2024, he has been host of the show Bez garda on Informer TV.

In June 2025, she was elected as the first president of the Association of Journalists of Serbia (Asocijacija novinara Srbije, ANS).
