= Igra Staklenih Perli =

Yugoslav rock band

Background information
- Also known as: ISP, ISP Quartet
- Origin: Belgrade, SR Serbia, SFR Yugoslavia
- Genres: Progressive rock; psychedelic rock; space rock
- Years active: 1976–1985 (Reunions: 2011)
- Labels: PGP-RTB, Kalemegdan Disk, PGP-RTS, Second Harvest
- Past members: Zoran Lakić; Vojkan Rakić; Predrag Vuković; Draško Nikodijević; Dragan Šoć; Slobodan Trbojević; Ivan Pajević; Ivan Stanković; Sinister Borg

Igra Staklenih Perli (Serbian Cyrillic: Игра Стаклених Перли; trans. The Glass Bead Game) was a Yugoslav progressive/psychedelic rock band formed in Belgrade in 1976.

The band was formed by keyboardist Zoran Lakić, guitarist Vojkan Rakić and percussionist Predrag Vuković and was later joined by bass guitarist and vocalist Draško Nikodijević and drummer Dejan Šoć. After the release of their debut self-titled album in 1978, Nikodijević was replaced by Slobodan Trbojević. The band released one more studio album, Vrt svetlosti in 1980, before disbanding in 1985. In 2011, the band reunited for two concerts, after which Nikodijević and Vuković recorded an album with a group of younger musicians under the name Igra Staklenih Perli The Next Generation.

== History ==
=== 1976-1985 ===
The band was formed in 1976 by old school friends, Zoran Lakić "Švaba" (keyboards) Vojkan Rakić (guitar) and Predrag Vuković (percussion). The band chose their name after Hermann Hesse's book The Glass Bead Game and were musically influenced by early Pink Floyd, Can, Tangerine Dream, Hawkwind and Jimi Hendrix. Until the arrival of the bass guitarist and vocalist Draško "Drak" Nikodijević, the band did not appear live.

Their first live appearances were at the amateur theatre festival Tokovi (Streams) at Voždovac and in the Dadov Theatre. In autumn of 1977 they were joined by drummer Dragan Šoć. Having played numerous free concerts at Belgrade's Students' Cultural Center and in the open in New Belgrade's Block 45, the band established a cult status and was offered a record contract by the PGP-RTB record label. In August 1978 they entered the studio and recorded their debut, self-titled album which featured the tracks "Gušterov trg" ("Lizard Square"), "Solarni modus" ("Solar Modus"), "Putovanje u plavo" ("Voyage into Blue"), "Pečurka" ("Mushroom") and "Majestetski kraj" ("Majestic End"). Most of the songs featured English language lyrics, with only "Putovanje u plavo" featuring lyrics in Serbo-Croatian. The track "Pečurka" was recorded as a tribute to the band Can. The album cover was designed by Vuković, who held a university degree in art history. In the interviews following the album release, the band described their music as "the music of the stream of consciousness". By then the group was appearing live with Goran Cvetić, a disk jockey and a journalist, who was in charge of the light show, slide shows and film projections during the performance. Their appearance at the Belgrade Faculty of Dental Medicine was bootlegged by Cvetić on a simple tape recorder for his personal archive. These recordings would later be released on the live album Soft Explosion Live.

Prior to the recording of the second album, Draško Nikodijević left the band and was replaced by Slobodan Trbojević, who was at the time the bass guitarist for the jazz band Ptica (Bird) and Džuboks music magazine correspondent. The second album, entitled Vrt svetlosti (The Garden Of Light), was recorded from August 1979 until January 1980. The album was produced by Aleksandar Pilipenko. It featured five fantasy- and science fiction-inspired tracks: "Igrač" ("Dancer"), "Čarobnjaci" ("Wizards"), "Vrt svetlosti" ("The Garden of Light"), "Lunarni Modus" ("Lunar Modus") and "Sanjaš" ("You Are Dreaming"). The album featured female vocalist Dragana Šarić, who would later start a successful solo career under the name Bebi Dol. Cover art was designed by Vuković and designer Dejan Popov, but the original version of the cover was refused by PGP-RTB as "unprofessionally designed", although it was likely refused as overly psychedelic. The album was promoted at a fashion show in Beko hall in Belgrade. In 1980 Rakić was replaced by guitarist Ivan Pajević, and Nikodijević returned to the band. In 1982 director Stanko Crnobrnja made a short film about the band entitled Na svoj način (In Their Own Way).

The band's last live appearance was in 1985, in the Sava Center concert hall in Belgrade, on the celebration concert dedicated to the anniversary of the youth magazine ITD. On this show the band performed with musician and music critics Aleksandar Žikić on guitar. Recordings for the third album with the working title ISP III were never officially released, but later appeared on the band's official MySpace page.

During the 1970s and the 1980s, many Belgrade musicians played with the band as guests. Out of the official members, the following took part: guitar players Goran Vejvoda, Aleksandar Žikić and Bojan Kveder, keyboard player Zoran Zagorčić (of Električni Orgazam), and drummer Ivica Vdović Vd (of Šarlo Akrobata).

=== Post breakup ===
In 1983, Nikodijević formed the post-punk band White Rabbit Band with the female drummer Snow White. The band was originally formed to appear in the avant-garde play Alisa u zemlji čuda (Alice in Wonderland), directed by Ištvan Lalić. Although the production eventually got cancelled, the band continued to perform, featuring Rakić on guitar and Svetolik Trifunović "Trile" on bass guitar. The recordings made by the band during the mid-1980s appeared in 2000 on the album 1986. In 1987, Nikodijević moved to New York, where he formed the band Go Ask Alice with a group of local musicians, and later he started White Rabbit CVLT project with former Luna and Pekinška Patka guitarist Zoran "Bale" Bulatović. In 1999, White Rabbit CVLT self-released the album ...And the Gods Made Wars, thematically inspired by the 1999 NATO bombing of Yugoslavia. After the album recording, Nikodijević and Bulatović formed the band Collateral Damage with former Ekatarina Velika drummer Ivan Fece "Firchie", former Električni Orgazam keyboardist Ljubomir Đukić and former Bezobrazno Zeleno guitarist Vojislav Bešić "Beške".

During summer 1991, German record label Kalemegdan Disk released three Igra Stalkenih Perli LPs. The first one, Soft Explosion Live, featured Cvetić's recording of the concert at the Belgrade Faculty of Dental Medicine. In 1993, the album was remixed and re-released, with some of the tracks shortened and the track "Majestic End" replaced by the final part of the song "Soft Explosion". The next release was Inner Flow which featured unreleased material recorded during the 1976-1979 period. The third Kalemegdan Disk release was Drives, which featured recordings from a four-hours session recorded in April 1977, backed with re-recordings made by Rakić, Vuković and keyboard player Zoran Zagorčić from the band Du Du A. Most of the artwork for these releases was designed by Vuković.

In 2005, Austrian record label Atlantide reissued both Igra Staklenih Perli and Vrt Svetlosti on vinyl. In 2007, remastered editions of both Igra Staklenih Perli studio albums appeared in Serbia and Germany. PGP-RTS edition Retrologija (Retrology), dedicated to remastered albums, featured both studio albums on one CD entitled Igra Svetlosti (The Game Of Light). German label Second Harvest remastered and expanded both albums on separate CDs. Igra Staklenih Perli was expanded with live tracks from Soft Explosion Live, while Vrt svetlosti was expanded with the recordings from Inner Flow.

=== 2011 reunion, post reunion ===
Igra Staklenih Perli reunited in 2011, featuring old members Draško Nikodijević (bass guitar, vocals), Zoran Lakić (keyboards, vocals) and Predrag Vuković (percussion, vocals), and young musicians Ivan Stanković (guitar, vocals) and Sinister Borg (drums). After two concerts in Belgrade club Žica, Draško Nikodijević, Predrag Vuković and Ivan Stanković continued to work under the name Igra Staklenih Perli The Next Generation, with Vlada Funtek on drums and Spomenka Milić on vocals and keyboards. In November 2012, the group released the studio album Apokaliptus. The album was available for free download through Exit Music. The album, produced by Dušan Kojić "Koja" (of Disciplina Kičme) and recorded by Boris Mladenović (of Jarboli, Veliki Prezir and Sila), featured guest appearances by Dejan Utvar on drums and Ljubomir Đukić of Električni Orgazam on keyboards and vocals. Shortly after the album release, Nikodijević reformed the White Rabbit Band with Andrija Babović (guitar, vocals) and Borko Petrović (drums).

Vojkan Rakić died in Belgrade on 21 July 2019. Draško Nikodijević died in Belgrade on 1 August 2021. Before his death Nikodijević finished the recording of White Rabbit Band's first official studio album, entitled Ek-A-Tattwa. The album was released posthumously in 2022.

== Discography ==
=== Studio albums ===
- Igra Staklenih Perli (1979)
- Vrt svetlosti (1980)

=== Live albums ===
- Soft Explosion Live (1991)
- Drives (1993)

=== Compilation albums ===
- Inner Flow (1991)
- Igra svetlosti (2007)
