= Utisak nedelje =

- Official logo
- Created by: Olja Bećković
- Starring: Olja Bećković
- Country of origin: Serbia
- No. of seasons: 24

Production
- Executive producer: Olja Bećković
- Running time: 90 minutes (with commercials)

Original release
- Network: Studio B (1991–1993, 1997, 2001–2002); B92 (2002–2014); Nova S (2019–2026); N1 (2026–present)
- Release: October 1991

Utisak nedelje (Serbian Cyrillic: Утисак недеље; lit. 'Impression of the Week') is a long-running Serbian political talk show hosted by Olja Bećković that airs live on TV channel Nova S.

Airing live Sundays at 9pm and conceptualized as recap of the preceding week's events, the show mostly covers political topics with a panel of typically three guests. Depending on the topic covered in a given week, number of guests goes up to five or down to a single guest.

Starting out on Studio B, a regional broadcaster for the city of Belgrade and its outlying area, in 1991 during the beginning stages of the dissolution of SFR Yugoslavia, Utisak nedelje bore witness to many of the geopolitical events affecting the area in the following decade, gaining high viewership and loyal following. Since 1997, its production has been handled by "PG Mreža", a production company headed by Zoran Ostojić and Lila Radonjić. In 2002, the show switched to RTV B92, a national broadcast TV channel, where it aired until 2014 when it was politically removed. In 2019, the show returned to TV channels, airing on Nova S.

== History ==
=== 1991–1993 ===
Utisak Nedelje was launched in October 1991 on Belgrade’s then-independent NTV Studio B. From the start it was conceived as a weekly Sunday night political talk show hosted by Olja Bećković, aimed at reviewing current political events and hosting open debates with public figures. According to the jury of Serbia’s prestigious Jug Grizelj journalism prize, the show “began airing in 1991… in the worst of times”.

During this period, the programme was produced within Studio B’s news department. Bećković served as editor and host, becoming known for her direct questioning style. The show aired once a week and typically featured two to four guests. Topics reflected major developments in Serbia and the former Yugoslavia, including the breakup of Yugoslavia, wars in Croatia and Bosnia and Herzegovina, United Nations sanctions, hyperinflation, domestic political conflicts, and media freedom.

Notable episodes included discussions on economic reforms and the emergence of private banking in Serbia in 1991, as well as a broadcast on 11 April 1993 addressing the concept of “patriotic journalism” during wartime. Guests during this period included representatives of both the ruling Socialist Party and opposition parties such as the Serbian Renewal Movement (SPO), making the programme one of the few forums in which opposing political viewpoints were presented in direct debate.

The show operated during a period of increasing media control under the government of Slobodan Milošević. Throughout 1991–1993, Studio B faced political pressure and internal restructuring. In late 1993, after changes in station management and disputes over editorial policy, Bećković left the station. Her departure on 5 October 1993 effectively ended the original run of Utisak Nedelje on Studio B. The programme did not return to air until several years later.

=== 1997 ===
After being removed from the air in 1993, Utisak nedelje returned in early 1997 on TV Studio B following the opposition coalition Zajedno’s victory in the 1996 local elections in Belgrade. The program was again hosted by Olja Bećković.

The program retained its established format this time featuring three to five guests debating the most significant political events of the week.

Topics during the 1997 run reflected the ongoing political crisis in Serbia, including the aftermath of the 1996–1997 electoral protests, disputes within the opposition, media freedom, the status of Republika Srpska, and rising tensions in Kosovo. Guests included leading political figures, journalists, intellectuals, and public personalities. Among those appearing were Vojislav Šešelj, Aleksandar Tijanić, Milan St. Protić, and Bora Đorđević.

By late 1997, following the collapse of the opposition coalition in Belgrade, Studio B’s management was replaced. The station returned to political control aligned with the ruling authorities, and Utisak nedelje was removed from the schedule. The programme again did not return to air until several years later.

=== 2013–14 season ===
What would turn out to be Utisak nedelje's last season on-air began on 2 September 2013 with a single guest — Serbian prime minister Ivica Dačić.

Two months later on 12 November first deputy prime minister Aleksandar Vučić, rumoured to be the biggest political authority in Serbia ever since the May 2012 elections, came on for the very first time as a single guest. That particular show featured another first; instead of its usual Sunday evening timeslot, it aired live on a Tuesday due to B92's live coverage the previous two days of Novak Djokovic's participation at the ATP World Tour Finals in London. The topics of conversation varied from possible SNS candidates for the new mayor of Belgrade after the SNS-engineered ousting of DS president Dragan Đilas from the mayoral post, Minister of Energy Zorana Mihajlović's perceived obstruction of the South Stream natural gas pipeline project, to the government's proclaimed tough stance on tycoons as exemplified through the prosecution of Miroslav Mišković. Things got testy at times with Vučić losing his cool at several Bećković's remarks, at one point even accusing her of spending 90% of her last 55 shows on smearing him via suggestions he's developing a dictatorship and fostering his own personality cult.

==== January 2014 guest appearance by Aleksandar Vučić ====
First deputy PM Vučić returned some two months later on 26 January 2014, again as a single guest, in anticipation of the 2014 parliamentary election. His appearance came about unexpectedly since two days earlier on Friday, 24 January, Minister of Economy Saša Radulović had been announced as guest. One day before the show, 25 January, Radulović resigned his cabinet post and then didn't appear as guest on Utisak nedelje without an explanation. Instead, first deputy PM Vučić came on the programme. In another testy and awkward conversation that at times turned outright hostile, Bećković pressed Vučić on the reasons new elections are being called, Radulović's resignation, and the abandoned, supposedly reformist, labour law while evasive Vučić accused Bećković of bias, suggesting several times she is "framing the discussion to suit the current political needs of the Democratic Party (DS)" and is basing her questions on their press-releases.

Nine months later, on 28 October 2014, Bećković, at this point no longer on the air, revealed what went on behind the scenes that weekend in late January: "Radulović was coming on Utisak nedelje because he wanted to announce his resignation live on air that Sunday. When the B92 director saw the promos announcing Radulović as guest, she called me telling me 'please, this can't happen, Vučić is losing it, cancel Radulović immediately, find a way to break it to him' to which I told her 'OK, I can tell him he's been banned from appearing on Utisak on B92 at this particular time because Vučić has a problem with it', which is obviously not what she wanted me to tell him. Meanwhile, that Saturday morning Vučić dissolved the cabinet, effectively announcing new elections for March while his people offered me an exclusive with him a day later on Utisak. So Radulović's resignation suddenly became less important story news-wise. Still, I think I never felt more shame in my 25 years as a journalist than that day [for dropping Radulović]. Vučić came on instead of Radulović and the first deputy PM and I had that now-infamous interview. The day after the show, Vučić called me on my phone and told me 'Congratulations, you humiliated me in front an audience of millions' and that was the last time we talked".

=== September 2014 removal from B92 ===
In mid-September 2014, prior to the beginning of the show's 24th season on air, information appeared in Serbian media about Utisak nedelje leaving B92 and possibly ending for good. Apparently, B92 management wanted the show moved from its country-wide terrestrial channel TV B92 to its cable outfit B92 Info, all of which Bećković and her production team at PG Mreža vehemently rejected, insisting on their contract with B92 until 1 March 2015 to be honoured in full, including the strict stipulation of having the show air on the main terrestrial channel. Simultaneously, a report also appeared in the Kurir tabloid, based "on sources close to the TV Pink owner Željko Mitrović", that Bećković has an offer of moving the show to TV Pink, a transfer that reportedly included "complete editorial freedom, €5,000 monthly salary, and the pick of any timeslot on Pink's schedule". Next day, the tabloid followed up with another report from an unnamed source close to Mitrović, this time claiming that in addition to all of the earlier stated offer terms, Mitrović is also willing to give Bećković the percentage from the show sponsors as well as lucrative ratings bonuses, all of which Mitrović himself confirmed when contacted by Kurir. Bećković's legal representative denied any contact with TV Pink, insisting she is under a valid and binding contract with B92.

The acrimony appeared to have died down a bit over the following days, especially once information appeared that B92 had apparently agreed to honour the terms of its contract with the show's producers and the start of a new season of Utisak nedelje had been scheduled for Sunday, 28 September as confirmed by the network's news division head Veran Matić.

However, on 26 September, two days before the show's 24th season was scheduled to begin, B92's PR department put out a press release saying that the "airing of Utisak nedelje is being suspended until further notice due to failure to reach an agreement between the B92 management on one side and the Mreža production company and the show's author Olja Bećković on the other". The press release continued by claiming "Mreža and Bećković turned down the B92 management's offer of having Utisak nedelje air on the terrestrial channel until November 2014 before moving to become the leading format on the B92 Info cable channel all in an effort to have the cult series and its author's longstanding reputation contribute to the development of B92's cable news platform", before adding that the negotiations between the two sides are ongoing. Several hours later, commenting the B92's press release, Bećković said to the Beta news agency: "Utisak nedelje didn't get suspended until further notice, it got banned. And I didn't turn down an offer, I turned down an ultimatum. They blackmailed me by telling me that the only way to continue under the terms of the current contract that's valid until March 2015 is to sign off on the show's move to B92 Info in November 2014. This is not a business decision; they were carrying out a political dictate".

==== Reaction ====
I absolutely never experienced such blackmail and pressure before. And there's something very interesting about that. People say this [wave of censorship in Serbia under the Prime Minister Aleksandar Vučić] is a return to the 1990s. No it's not, it's worse than the 1990s. Milošević never muzzled the media this perfidiously. His methods were far less sophisticated and everything was out in the open. He'd go into the RTS and let a few thousand people go, but he knew he had to spare an outlet like Studio B and some opposition newspapers from being under his tight grip.

— Olja Bećković on 27 September 2014

Coming on the heels of the Predrag Sarapa-hosted Sarapin problem, another long-running political talk-show that had been perceived as critical of the ruling Serbian Progressive Party (SNS), being removed from the Studio B airwaves, the B92's decision to drop Utisak nedelje from its schedule caused a lot of reaction in Serbia.

The biggest opposition party, DS, put out a release saying that "the whole episode is a disturbing warning that recalls the days of the coaxial cable-gate", referring to the infamous scandal from the 1990s when the Slobodan Milošević-led authorities regularly resorted to jamming the signals of TV stations critical of their policies, a practice that was on one occasion cynically explained as "water getting into the coaxial cable".

The journalists' groups and trade unions operating in Serbia, UNS, NUNS, PROUNS, and SINOS, all put out releases condemning the action by B92.

Astonko, a limited-liability company that holds majority stake in B92, put out a release of its own stating "Utisak nedelje wasn't banned", adding that "any such interpretation of the inability on the part of Bećković and B92 management to reach an agreement over the airing of her show is baseless and malicious".

For her part, over the next few days, Bećković gave print interviews to Frankfurtske Vesti, Politika, Blic, and Radio Free Europe/Radio Liberty's Serbian service as well as television appearances on Danica Vučenić's Jedan na jedan programme on RTV and on Al Jazeera Balkans' Kontekst programme hosted by Anne-Marie Ćurčić, saying:

The new season of Utisak was originally supposed to start on Sunday, 31 August, but got delayed for some ridiculous reason and then this happened. I didn't understand why they wanted me to sign a new contract when I've got a valid existing one until March 2015. Why move to a cable channel that essentially doesn't exist, has no viewership, and no audience coverage? It made much more sense to complete my current contract on the terrestrial channel that has a license to broadcast nationally, and then in March see what's become of this newly transformed cable channel or if that transformation process is even completed by then. But no, they were adamant that this simply can't be done, blackmailing me by making it clear the only way to start the season is agreeing to move to B92 Info on 3 November, all of which tells me someone from the political circles gave them an order to carry out and they did.

Asked to comment the supposed lucrative offer by Željko Mitrović of moving Utisak to TV Pink, Bećković responded:

That was such a manipulative little ploy from their side. We all know TV Pink kowtows to Vučić, so by having Mitrović's Pink supposedly make an offer to me, they wanted to give off this impression that Vučić couldn't possibly be behind my removal from B92. That offer together with its media coverage in Vučić's tabloids was a ridiculous bait to distract the public's attention from the essence of this matter. Meanwhile, those very same tabloids are presenting me as a person who's "shaking down her employer for more money while the poor people of Serbia are suffering under the hardships of the economic crisis". These guys are masters when it comes to this kind of populist wile. As for how this offer was presented to me, Mitrović called my phone, but I didn't pick up. He then made the offer by sending me a text message containing all this stuff about €5,000 per month, sponsors, and so forth, which I never replied to. Literally 30 seconds after receiving his "offer" text, I got a call from Informer asking me if it's true, as they supposedly heard from their trusted sources, that I got a business offer from the owner of TV Pink. The whole thing was like a low-rent version of House of Cards.

Consisting of journalists Brankica Stanković, Miodrag Čvorović, Mirjana Jevtović, Irena Stević, Jasmina Pašić, and Ivan Angelovski, the production team of Insajder, a B92 investigative programme whose latest series began airing on 21 September, reacted as well in a press release saying it "disagrees with the B92 owners' decision to keep insisting on moving Utisak nedelje to B92 Info in November 2014". The Insajder team also shared their own recent experiences with B92: "Seeing that we can't imagine a future for Insajder on a channel that completely commercialized its content and considering B92's publicly stated intent of transforming the B92 Info cable channel into a sound news source with original content, two weeks ago we already asked the B92 ownership and management to allow us, the Insajder team, to take over the B92 Info's editorial duties and launch the transformed cable channel in January 2015. The owners' insistence for this transformation to happen in November 2014, despite the fact that no credible news concept can be implemented on such short notice, raises logical doubt whether their goal is creating a serious news channel or is this just a ploy to dump away first Utisak nedelje and then other B92 news programmes like Insajder and Kažiprst?"

Sunday, 28 September at 9pm, the time Utisak nedelje's new season was supposed to start, a group of some 200 people showed up in silent protest in front of the B92 building in New Belgrade, including DS politicians Bojan Pajtić, Dragan Šutanovac, and Borko Stefanović, LDP president Čedomir Jovanović, former politician and diplomat Vesna Pešić, author Vladimir Kecmanović, film director and SPS MP Srđan Dragojević, film director and producer Dragan Bjelogrlić, actor Branimir Brstina, journalists Antonela Riha and Danica Vučenić, etc.

In his Radio Free Europe/Radio Liberty online column, Teofil Pančić labeled the removal of Bećković from B92 "a gradual and soft strangulation of a popular pluralistic public forum", seeing it as "part of the process that has been going on for two years in Serbia already: the process of the SNS-led authorities systematically assuming complete control over vital news streams in the country, all the while being extremely cooperative, servile even, with the West thereby getting some much-needed room to maneuver when it comes to achieving their ultimate goal — the all-encompassing occupation of the Serbian political scene and public sphere".

On 2 October, B92 put out yet another press release, this time reacting to Bećković's interviews. The release accuses Bećković of "not only showing a lack of understanding but also committing a gross violation of professional ethics in an obvious attempt to discredit the B92 company", before stating that "this is especially disappointing considering the company invested around €2 million in her over the previous 12 years". The release concludes by accusing Bećković and PG Mreža of intentionally creating a negative atmosphere, smearing B92's reputation, and exerting pressure on the company's editorial policy in an effort of gaining a better negotiating position for themselves. The same day, B92 news director Veran Matić distanced himself from the release saying he did not take part in writing it. The day also saw the Serbian defense minister and the Serbian Progressive Party vice-president Bratislav Gašić chime in, saying "Prime Minister Aleksandar Vučić isn't afraid of any TV show and is not in any way connected to this" in response to the DS member of parliament Borko Stefanović's claims that the show got removed on prime minister's instructions.

Both Bećković and PG Mreža reacted to the 2 October B92 release, contesting its claims.

European Federation of Journalists (EFJ), a branch of the International Federation of Journalists (IFJ), joined their Serbian affiliates UNS, NUNS, and SINOS in protesting B92's decision to drop Utisak nedelje, saying it "very much smells like censorship". On the other hand, Ištvan Kaić, a member of the Public Policy Institute, a think tank established by Vladimir "Beba" Popović, described Bećković in his piece in E-novine as "a former show-business starlet with an abundance of self-pity and a lack of understanding of the business environment" while dismissing her claims "as intentional falsehoods presented to the public".

Film director Emir Kusturica expressed public support for Bećković during a guest appearance on Milomir Marić's Ćirilica talk show on 6 October, calling the removal of Utisak nedelje "a grave mistake". Kusturica reiterated his support for Bećković in a Blic interview a month later, saying: "I don't care whether it was business or politics nor am I interested in personal relations between Olja and Vučić. That our social arena suddenly has no place for her is terrible and it spoils the image of the city of Belgrade, a city that in her TV programme had a speaker's corner where current events would receive the final take and analysis. She has a place in our public sphere and I'm hoping some broadcaster, like RTS, will give her the space she deserves".

In his mid-October interview for Danas, veteran Croatian journalist Goran Milić, currently performing the program director role at the pan-Balkan Al Jazeera Balkans, came out saying he does not see censorship in the case of Olja Bećković's Utisak nedelje being removed from B92.

=== 2019 return on Nova S ===
In April 2019, Utisak nedelje began to air every Sunday evening on cable TV channel "Nova S".
