= Olja Bećković =

Serbian journalist, actress and television presenter

Olja Bećković Оља Бећковић ChLD
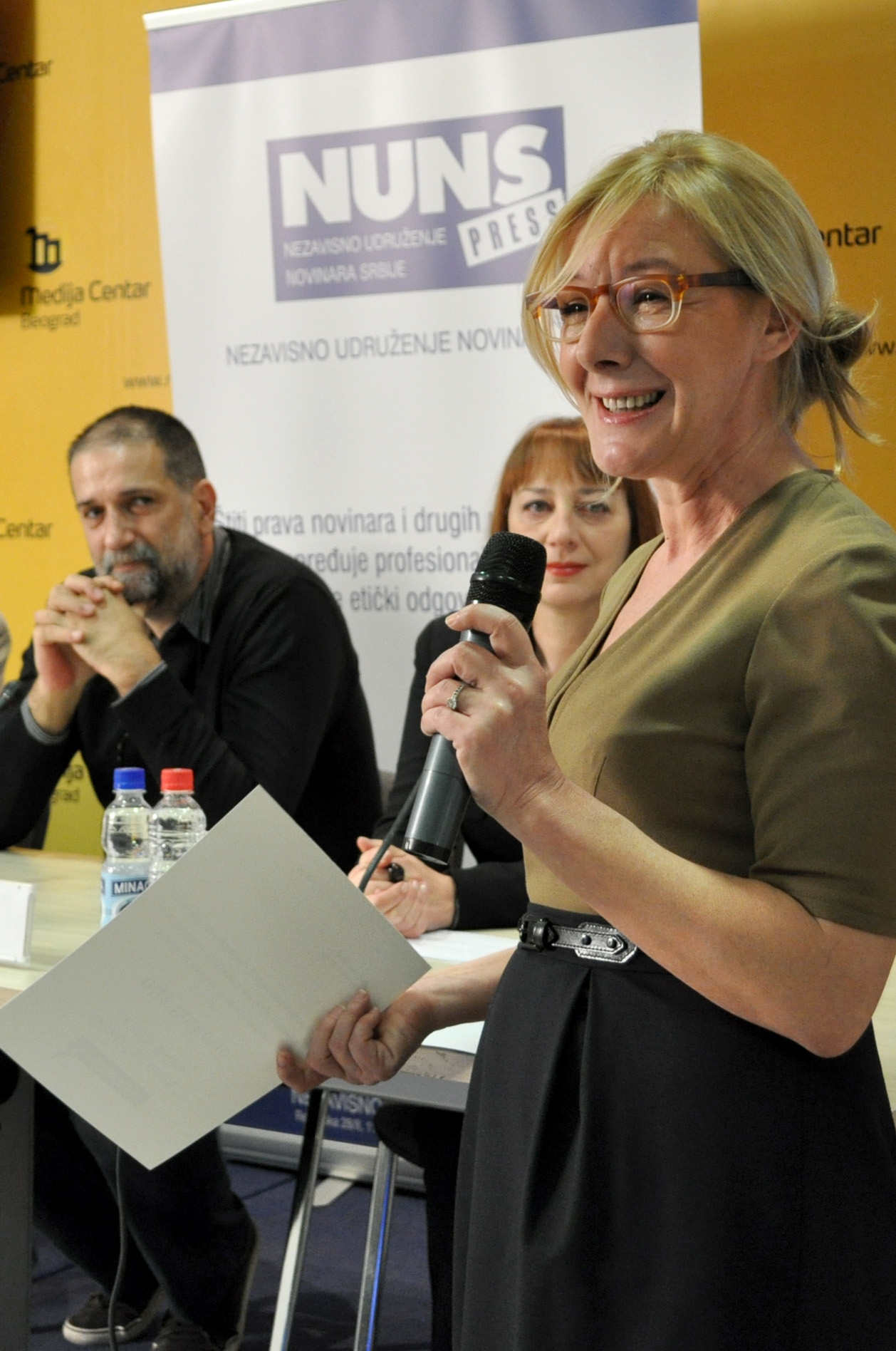
- Bećković receiving the 2013 Jug Grizelj Award in March 2014
- Born: 1 May 1964 (age 62); Belgrade, SR Serbia, SFR Yugoslavia
- Education: Faculty of Dramatic Arts, University of Arts in Belgrade
- Occupation: Journalist
- Years active: 1984–present
- Television: RTV Studio B (1991–1996); B92 (2002–2014); Nova S (2019–present)
- Parent(s): Matija Bećković; Vera Pavladoljska

Olja Bećković ChLD (Serbian Cyrillic: Оља Бећковић; born 1 May 1964) is a Serbian journalist, actress and television presenter.

She hosted political talk show Utisak nedelje (English: Impression of the Week) from 1991 until 2014 and again as of 2019.

== Career ==
Bećković studied drama in Belgrade and trained as an actress until the age of twenty five before switching over to journalism.

In March 2014, Bećković received the Jug Grizelj Award. Her talk programme Utisak nedelje got taken off the air in September 2014 in controversial fashion.

In April 2015, Bećković got hired by the NIN weekly newsmagazine for a monthly interview feature called 'Intervju meseca'. Her first interview was with Slavoljub Đukić.

In the months following her removal from B92, Bećković became a recipient of the Ordre national de la Légion d'honneur award, which was handed to her on 30 April 2015 at a ceremony in the French embassy in Belgrade. At the ceremony, the French ambassador in Serbia Christine Moro explained the accolade as being awarded to Bećković for "her exceptional professional path, courage, and fearlessness" while adding that by awarding Bećković "France is also extolling the journalistic profession as a whole".

== Personal life ==
Bećković is the daughter of Serbian poet Matija Bećković and Vera Pavladoljska.

During her late teens, Bećković was briefly married to theater director Nenad Ilić.

During early 1990s, she married Vlada Višnjić (1967–1999). The couple had a child, son Luka, in 1994. Vlada Višnjić died in 1999, aged 32.
