= Rock Express =

Former Serbian music magazine

- Cover of the 32nd issue, featuring Ozzy Osbourne
- Editor-in-Chief: Branko Rogošić
- Categories: Music magazine
- Frequency: Monthly
- Publisher: Rock Express
- Founded: 1997
- First issue: October 1997
- Final issue: December 2004
- Country: Yugoslavia (1997-2003); Serbia (2003-2004)
- Language: Serbian

Rock Express (Serbian Cyrillic: Рок Експрес) was a Serbian music magazine.

== History ==
Rock Express was founded in 1997. The magazine's Editor-in-Chief was Branko Rogošić. The first issue was released in October 1997, and the last, 42nd issue was released in December 2004.

== Metal Express ==
In January 1999, Rock Express started to publish Metal Express, dedicated to heavy metal music. Metal Express was initially released as a supplement for Rock Express, but later appeared as an independent publication. The last, 15th issue of Metal Express was released in April 2004.

== Rock Express Records ==
In 1997, Rock Express started its own record label, Rock Express Records. The label was mostly heavy metal-oriented. Some of the artists that have been signed to Rock Express Records include:

- Draconic
- Kraljevski Apartman
- May Result

The label also reissued albums by former Yugoslav heavy metal acts, most notably Gordi and Heller, and issued albums by foreign acts like Strapping Young Lad and Brujeria for the Serbian market.

== See also ==
- Rock Express Top 100 Yugoslav Rock Songs of All Times
