= Gordi (band) =

Yugoslav rock band

- The 1981-1984 Gordi lineup, from left to right: Slobodan Svrdlan, Zlatko Manojlović, Čedomir Petrović

Background information
- Origin: Belgrade, Serbia
- Genres: Progressive rock; hard rock; heavy metal
- Years active: 1977-1984; 2024
- Labels: ZKP RTLJ, PGP-RTB, Jugoton, Rock Express Records, Croatia Records
- Members: Zlatko Manojlović; Todor Manojlović; Marko Terlević; Dalibor Marinković; Berislav Blažević
- Past members: Goran Manojlović; Stevan Milutinović; Dragan Janković; Zdenko Pomper; Slobodan Svrdlan; Čedomir Petrović
- Website: gordi3.com

Gordi (Serbian Cyrillic: Горди; trans. The Proud Ones) was a Yugoslav rock band formed in Belgrade in 1977. Initially a progressive rock band, Gordi made a shift to heavy metal in early 1980s.

The band was formed by guitarist and vocalist Zlatko Manojlović, former leader of the progressive rock band Dah. Gordi released three progressive/hard rock-oriented albums before switching to heavy metal with their fourth studio album Pakleni trio (1981). The group released one more heavy metal album, Kraljica smrti (1982), disbanding two years after its release. After Gordi ended their activity, Manojlović started a successful career as a solo artist. In 2024, he reformed Gordi with a group of younger musicians, the new lineup releasing the group's comeback, hard rock-oriented album Fenix. In the post-Yugoslav countries, Gordi are generally best known for their heavy metal works, with their fourth and fifth studio album often considered milestones on the Yugoslav heavy metal scene.

== History ==
=== 1977–1984 ===
The band was formed in November 1977, by former Džentlmeni, Fleš and Dah member Zlatko Manojlović after his return from his mandatory stint in the Yugoslav People's Army. The band's first lineup consisted of Zlatko Manojlović (guitar, vocals), Zlatko's brother Goran Manojlović (a former Dah member, keyboards), Stevan "Steva" Milutinović (a former Dogovor iz 1804., Moira and Dah member, drums) and Dragan Janković (a former Buket Mojih Prijatelja member, bass guitar). After Zdenko Pomper (a former Dah member) replaced Janković on bass guitar, the band released its debut album Čovek (Man) in 1978, through ZKP RTLJ. The album featured progressive rock sound similar to the one of Manojlović's previous band, Dah. The album featured the song "Misli" ("Thoughts"), which was previously released as the B-side of the single "Žeđ" ("Thirst"), the last single released by Dah. The lyrics for the song "Odlazim u noć" ("I'm Leaving into the Night") were written by Predrag Vuković, percussionist of the band Igra Staklenih Perli.

Soon after the release of the debut album, Pomper left the band (several years later he would tragically lose his life in a street fight). He was replaced by Slobodan Svrdlan, with whom Gordi released their second studio album, Gordi 2. The album was released in 1979, through PGP-RTB. While the band's first album was mainly progressive rock-oriented, Gordi 2 featured more hard rock elements, with the songs "Ovog leta idem na more" ("I'm Going to the Seaside This Summer") and "Baci tu cigaru" ("Throw Away That Cigar") receiving most radio play in Yugoslavia. During the same year, the band won first place on an international rock festival in Poznań, Poland. In 1980, Zlatko Manojlović released his first solo album Zlatko i njegove gitare (Zlatko and His Guitars), and in 1981 the band released their third studio album, Gordi 3, through PGP-RTB, with the songs "Haos u radio mreži" ("Chaos in Radio Network") and "Stari as" ("Old Ace") receiving most radio play. The album featured a new drummer, Čedomir Petrović "Čeda" (a former Bicikl and Siluete member). Although generally progressive/hard rock-oriented, Gordi 3 also featured some pop music elements. The closing track on the album, instrumental "Uspavanka" ("Lullaby"), was dedicated to Zlatko Manojlović's son Miloš. During the same year, Gordi performed as the opening band on Ian Gillan Band concert in Belgrade's Pionir Hall.

In 1981, Gordi became a power trio, after Goran Manojlović left the band. The band signed for Jugoton and released the album Pakleni trio (Hell Trio), which marked their shift towards heavy metal. In 1982, the band released their second heavy metal-oriented album, Kraljica smrti (Queen of Death), however, they failed to maintain their popularity and disbanded two years after the album release.

=== Post breakup ===
Manojlović dedicated himself to his solo career. Svrdlan became a member of the heavy metal band Ratnici, releasing two albums with them. In 1983, he played bass guitar on U Škripcu album O je!. In the early 1990s, he moved to Los Angeles, where he became a member of the band Lost City, recording the album Watching You (1993) with them. In the late 1990s, he was a member of the British band Michael Aston's Gene Loves Jezebel, appearing on their 1999 album, Love Lies Bleeding. For a period of time he played with the Los Angeles-based band Q. In 2005, he appeared as a guest on Generacija 5 album Energija (Energy), playing bass guitar on five tracks.

In 1994, the song "Put do pakla" ("Road to Hell") was released on Komuna compilation album Pakleni vozači: Jugoslovenski hard rock (Hell Riders: Yugoslav Hard Rock), which was a part of Komuna's YU retROCKspektiva (YU RetROCKspective) album series. In 2006, Rock Express Records reissued Pakleni trio, featuring four videos as bonus material. In 2007, the same record label re-released Kraljica smrti, featuring three videos as bonus material. In 2021, Croatia Records released a Zlatko Manojlović box set entitled Od Daha do Gordih (From Dah to Gordi), featuring reissues of Pakleni trio and Kraljica smrti.

=== 2024 reformation ===
In 2024, Manojlović reformed Gordi. The new lineup featured, beside Zlatko Manojlović, his son Todor Manojlović (guitar, bass guitar), Marko Terlević (bass guitar), Dalibor "Dado" Marinković (drums), and Berislav "Bero" Blažević (keyboards), the latter two also being full-time members of Parni Valjak. The new lineup recorded and released the group's comeback, mostly hard rock-oriented album Fenix through Croatia Records. All the songs were authored by Manojlović.

== Discography ==
=== Studio albums ===
- Čovek (1978)
- Gordi 2 (1979)
- Gordi 3 (1979)
- Pakleni trio (1981)
- Kraljica smrti (1982)
- Fenix (2024)

=== Singles ===
- "Duga noć" / "Idi sad" (1978)
