= Bebi Dol =

Serbian pop-rock singer-songwriter

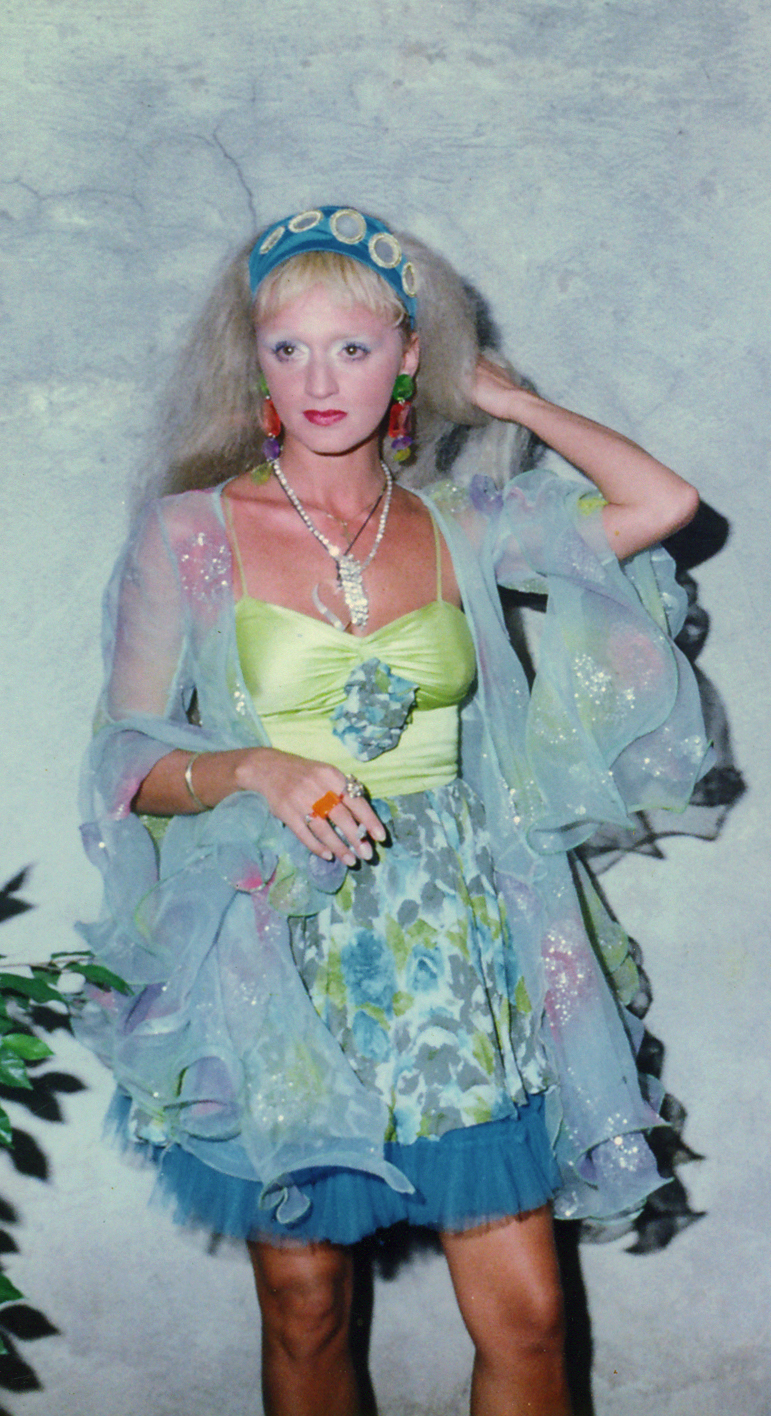
- Bebi Dol in 1991

Background information
- Also known as: Dana Todorović
- Born: Dragana Šarić; 2 October 1962 (age 64); Belgrade, PR Serbia, FPR Yugoslavia
- Genres: New wave; pop rock; synth-pop; jazz; funk; soul; Europop
- Occupations: Singer; songwriter; actress
- Instrument: Vocals
- Years active: 1981–present
- Labels: PGP-RTB; PGP-RTS; Mascom
- Spouse: Aleks Todorović (m. 2014)

Dana Todorović (Note: formerly called Dragana) (née Dragana Šarić; (Note: pronounced [ʃǎritɕ]) Serbian Cyrillic: Дана Тодоровић, née Драгана Шарић; born 2 October 1962), better known under the stage name Bebi Dol (Note: pronounced [bêbi dôːl]) (Serbian Cyrillic: Беби Дол, lit. 'Baby Doll'), is a Serbian and former Yugoslav singer-songwriter, performer and actress. Known for her distinctive voice, theatrical style and eclectic musical influences, she became one of the most recognizable pop and new-wave artists of the Yugoslav music scene during the 1980s. She gained major popularity with songs such as “Mustafa,” “Rudi,” and “Inšalah”. She represented Yugoslavia at the Eurovision Song Contest 1991 with "Brazil". Following her mid- and late-2000s releases, she has semi-retired from the music scene, performing live occasionally only.

== Early life ==
Dragana Šarić was born on 2 October 1962 in Belgrade, FPR Yugoslavia. Her mother Magdalena worked for Television Belgrade, while her father Milisav Šarić was a jazz saxophonist. Because of her father’s career performing at American military bases, the family spent part of her early childhood living in Copenhagen, and later traveling around Europe.

At the age of seven she returned to Belgrade, where she attended the Mokranjac Music School, receiving formal musical training. After graduating from the 14th Grammar School, she enrolled at the Faculty of Philosophy at the University of Belgrade, where she studied anthropology.

== Musical career ==
=== Early career (late 1970s–1981) ===
In the late 1970s she began her music career as part of a band called Tarkus, formed with fellow music-school students. The group won a competition organized by Radio Belgrade, which allowed them to record in a professional studio.

During this period she also collaborated with several notable Yugoslav rock bands. In 1979 she appeared as a backing vocalist on the album Samo napred... (Go Ahead...) by YU Grupa, and in 1980 she was a guest singer on Vrt svetlosti (Garden of Light) by Igra Staklenih Perli.

Shortly afterward she formed the band Annoda Rouge with guitarist Goran Vejvoda, Ivan Vdović, and Slobodan Trbojević but the group was short-lived.

=== Breakthrough and popularity (1981–1991) ===
Bebi Dol launched her solo career in 1981 with the single “Mustafa” ("Mustapha"), which quickly became a major hit in Yugoslavia. The song, influenced by Middle Eastern musical motifs and inspired by Lawrence Durrell's tetralogy The Alexandria Quartet, was named Record of the Year by the Yugoslav music magazine Džuboks.

Her debut album Ruže i krv (Roses and Blood), released in 1983, established her as one of the most innovative pop artists in the country. The album mixed pop, synth-pop, jazz and avant-garde elements. That same year she competed in Jugovizija 1983 in Novi Sad, finishing sixth with “Rudi”, a song inspired by silent-film star Rudolph Valentino. Her first solo concert was held on 13 June 1983 at Atelje 212 theatre in Belgrade. Soon afterward she toured with major Yugoslav pop star Zdravko Čolić.

Between 1984 and 1986 she moved to Cairo, performing regularly at the Sheraton Hotel. After returning to Yugoslavia she continued recording and performing at music festivals, winning awards at the MESAM festival with songs such as ("Inshallah") and “Kad sreća odlazi” ("When Happiness Leaves"). In 1989, Bebi Dol also performed at the Gold Malaysian Festival in Kuala Lumpur.

In 1991 Bebi Dol won Jugovizija, held in Sarajevo, with the song “Brazil.” She represented Yugoslavia at the Eurovision Song Contest 1991 held in Rome. Although the performance finished second to last with only one point, the song later gained a cult following among Eurovision fans. Her entry was also historically significant because it was the last official Eurovision entry from Yugoslavia, as the country began to dissolve later that year.

=== Later music career (1991–2000s) ===
After Eurovision she spent some time living in Paris, signing a recording contract there before eventually returning to Serbia due to political instability in the region.

In 1995 she released her second studio album Ritam srca (Rhythm of the Heart), which included new material as well as Serbian-language covers of Madonna's "Take a Bow" and Judy Garland's "Over the Rainbow" (entitled "Iznad duge"). In 1999, Bebi Dol recorded the song "Ti si moj svet" ("You Are My World") for the various artists album Proleće na trgu – Moj Beograd srce ima (A Spring at the Square – My Belgrade Has a Heart), featuring protest songs against NATO bombing of Yugoslavia.

Her third album Ljuta sam… (I’m Angry…) appeared in 2002 and was dedicated to people she had lost during her life. A year later, she entered the Beovizija 2003 with "Tvrdoglava" ("Stubborn"), placing 10th. In 2006 she released the English-language cover album Čovek rado izvan sebe živi (One Gladly Lives Out of Himself), followed by the live album Veče u pozorištu (A Night at the Theatre) in 2007, featuring covers of Lenny Kravitz, Simon & Garfunkel, Pink Floyd, Louis Armstrong and Michael Jackson, as well as the songs from her previous release. In 2008, Bebi Dol released the compilation album ...Pokloni se... (...Take a Bow...).

=== Collaborations ===
During her career, Bebi Dol made a number of guest appearances. She appeared on albums by YU Grupa, Igra Staklenih Perli, KIM, Kozmetika, Leb i Sol, Idoli, Bulevar, Du Du A, Zona B, Bajaga i Instruktori, Oliver Mandić and Massimo Savić. In 1983, she briefly collaborated in Germany with British singer and songwriter Howard Devoto, and in 1989 she briefly worked with American avant-garde composer Neil Rolnick. She has written lyrics for YU Grupa, Cactus Jack, Generacija 5 and other acts.

== Television, acting and media work ==
Besides music, Bebi Dol also worked in film and television. In 1985, she provided singing voiceover for the character of Ana, played by Sonja Savić, in Boro Drašković's movie Life Is Beautiful. She appeared in Žika Mitrović's 1986 film Protest Album. In 1987, she portrayed Ophelia in Titograd National Theatre's production of Hamlet. She also appeared in TV series such as Bolji život and Lisice.

In 2003 she hosted her own talk show “Bla Bla Bebi.” Later she became widely known to younger audiences through participation in several Serbian reality shows, including Farma, Dvor, and Zadruga. During 2017, she was also a contestant on the fourth Serbian season of Your Face Sounds Familiar, winning the first episode as Emeli Sandé.

In 2020, she made a cameo appearance in the series Tajkun (Tycoon), directed by Dragan Bjelogrlić, as a folk singer named Martina, performing "Rano je za tugu" ("It's Early to Be Sad"), originally performed by Haris Džinović.

== Personal life ==
In the late 1970s and early 1980s, Bebi Dol dated guitarist Goran Vejvoda. During the 1980s she was also in a relationship with singer Massimo Savić, with whom she recorded the duet “Sunce sja, trava miriše.”

Throughout her career, Serbian media often published claims that she struggled with drug addiction, which she repeatedly denied, saying the rumors were painful and untrue. She explained that such stories appeared partly because she had lived with a partner who used drugs. She also denied media reports claiming that she relied on meals from a soup kitchen.

On 27 September 2014, she married Aleks Todorović, a Serbian professor of Russian language and literature born in Los Angeles. After the marriage, it was reported that she adopted the surname Todorović. In 2025, she changed her name to Dana, her church name, saying she wanted to "start a new life".

In March 2025, Bebi Dol was recorded in the area informally known as Ćacilend, occupied by supporters of the Serbian Progressive Party (SNS) during the Serbian anti-corruption protests.

== Legacy ==
In 2006, the song "Rudi" was ranked No. 43 on the B92 Top 100 Domestic Songs list.

== Discography ==
=== Studio albums ===
- Ruže i krv (1983)
- Ritam srca (1995)
- Ljuta sam... (2002)
- Čovek rado izvan sebe živi (2006)

=== Live albums ===
- Veče u pozorištu (2007)

=== Compilations ===
- ...Pokloni se... (2008)

=== Singles ===
- "Mustafa" / "Na planeti uzdaha" (1981)
- "Rudi" (12-inch single; 1983)
- "Inšalah" / "Ruža na dlanu" (split single with Zana Nimani; 1986)
- "Prove To All" / "How Good Not To Love" (1986)
- "Brazil" (1991)

=== Other appearances ===
- "Ti si moj svet" (Proleće na trgu – Moj Beograd srce ima, 1999)

== Filmography and television appearances ==
Film
Year	Title	Role	Notes
1986	Protestni album	Flora	
2017	Malesh	Oldest daughter	Short film

Television appearances
Year	Title	Role	Notes
1990	Bolji život	Singer in the bar	One episode
2003	Lisice	Herself	One episode
2009	Farma	Herself	Season 1, Eliminated
2010	Dvor	Herself	Season 1, Eliminated
2013	Farma	Herself	Season 4, Eliminated
2015	Farma	Herself	Season 6, Eliminated
2017	Tvoje lice zvuči poznato	Herself	Season 4, 10th place
2017-2018	Zadruga	Herself	Season 1, Eliminated
2020	Tajkun	Martina	Two episodes
2022	Prvi bend Srbije	Herself	Judge

== See also ==
- Popular music in Yugoslavia
- Music of Serbia
- List of musicians from Serbia

== Notes ==
Preceded by Tajči	Yugoslavia in the Eurovision Song Contest; 1991	Succeeded by Extra Nena for FR Yugoslavia
