= Ratko Tankosić =

Serbian actor (born 1954)

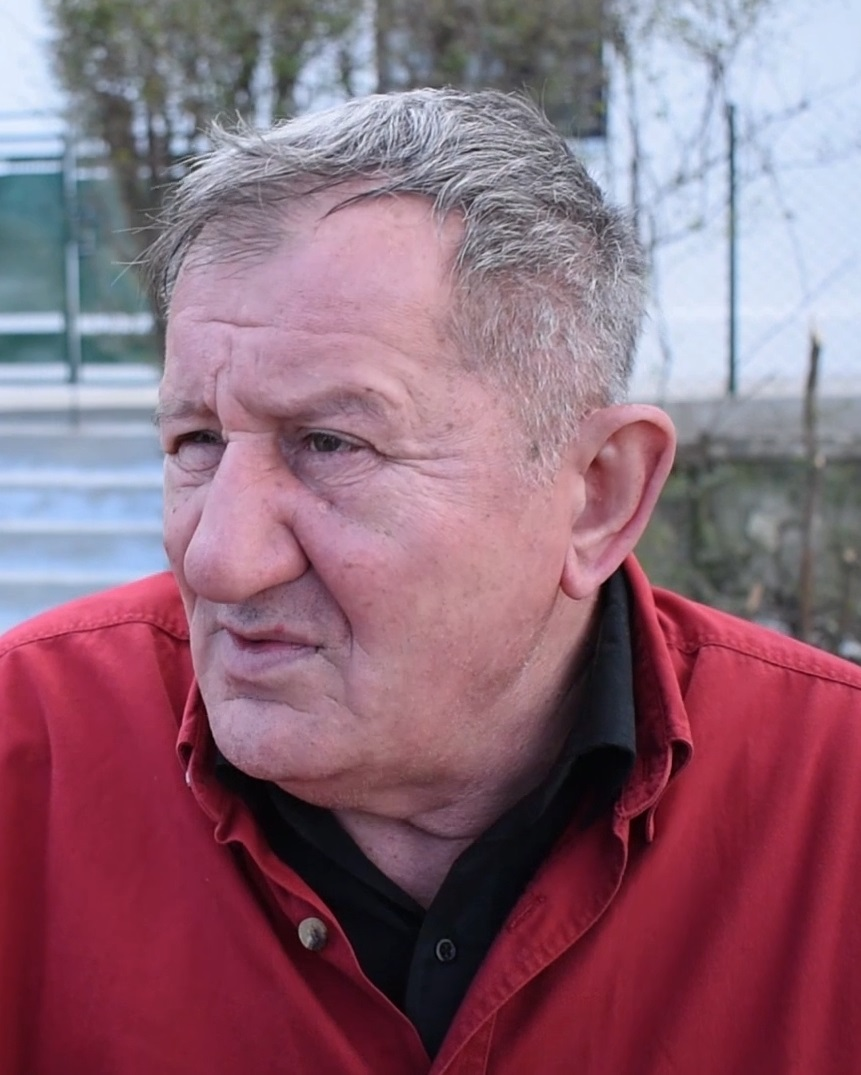
- Ratko Tankosić in 2020.
- Born: 5 June 1954 (age 72); Belgrade, Yugoslavia
- Occupation: Actor
- Years active: 1972-present

Ratko Tankosić (born 5 June 1954) is a Serbian actor. He appeared in more than one hundred films since 1972.

== Selected filmography ==
| Year | Title | Role | Notes |
|---|---|---|---|
| 2020. | Ideal job | | |
| 1989 | Beyond The Door III | | |
| 1987 | Reflections | | |
| 1986 | Happy New Year '49 | | |
| 1983 | Balkan Express | | |
| 1977 | Special Education | | |
