= Dah (band) =

Yugoslav later Belgian based rock band (1972–1977)

Background information
- Also known as: Land
- Origin: Belgrade, SR Serbia, SFR Yugoslavia
- Genres: Progressive rock; folk rock
- Years active: 1972–1977
- Labels: Jugoton, Studio B, Polydor, Diskos
- Past members: Zlatko Manojlović; Branko Marušić; Branko Gluščević; Radomir Dubičanin; Velibor Bogdanović; Goran Manojlović; Tommy Schaplteholtz; Willy Pultz; Zdenko Pomper; Stevan Milutinović; Dragan Mihajlović; Vidoja Božinović; Dušan Đukić

Dah (Serbian Cyrillic: Дах, trans. Breath) was a Yugoslav and later Belgian progressive rock band formed in Belgrade in 1972.

Dah was formed by guitarist Zlatko Manojlović and guitarist and vocalist Branko Marušić "Čutura", the two previously performing together in the band Džentlmeni. After the release of Dah's debut single in 1973, Marušić left the band, so Manojlović took the singing duties. After the release of their debut album, Veliki cirkus (1974), the band moved to Belgium, changing their name to Land. After spending a year in Belgium and having an international hit with the song "Shoshana", the band returned to Yugoslavia, where they released their second album, Povratak (1976). In 1976, Zlatko Manojlović went to serve his mandatory stint in the Yugoslav army, his brother, keyboardist Goran Manojlović, took over leading of Dah, the group disbanding in 1977. Zlatko Manojlović would continue his career as the leader of the band Gordi, and later as a successful solo artist.

== History ==
Prior to the formation of Dah, guitarist Zlatko Manojlović performed in the bands Džentlmeni and Fleš (Flash), recording a 7-inch single with the latter, released in 1972 and featuring the songs "Ne laži, draga" ("Don't Lie, Darling") and "Svet bez ljubavi" ("World Without Love"). In 1972, Manojović formed Dah with Branko Marušić "Čutura" (a former Albatrosi and Džentlmeni member, guitar and vocals), Branko Gluščević (a former Iskre, Siluete and Lutalice member, bass guitar) and Radomir Dubičanin (a former Fleš member, drums). In April 1973, the band performed at the third edition of the BOOM Festival, and their song "Ako poželiš" ("If You Wish") was released on the double live album BOOM Pop Fest '73 recorded on the festival. Soon after, the band released their debut 7-inch single with the studio version of "Ako poželiš" and the song "Noćna buka" ("Night Noise"), which they promoted performing in the display window of a record shop.

After the release of the single, Marušić left the band and began his solo career. Manojlović took the singing duties, and Dah performed as a power trio for a year and a half. After Dubičanin moved to Siluete, he was replaced by Velibor "Boka" Bogdanović (a former Plavi Dečaci, Džentlmeni, YU Grupa and Opus member). On several occasions the band worked in studio with organist Miodrag Okrugić (a former Beduini, YU Grupa and Opus member), the result of this cooperation being the single "Gitareska" ("Gitaresque").

Dah's debut album Veliki cirkus (The Big Circus) was released in 1974 through Jugoton. The album lyrics were written by the disc jockey Zoran Modli, with his lyrics for some of the songs, such as "Prohujalo sa vihorom" ("Gone with the Wind"), "Majka Jugovića" ("Mother of the Jugović Brothers") and "Troil i Kesida" ("Troilus and Criseyde"), being inspired by great works of literature.

In 1975, the band moved to Belgium, where they performed under the name Land. The Belgian lineup of the band featured, alongside Manojlović and Bogdanović, Zlatko Manojlović's brother Goran (keyboards), and two Belgian musicians, Tommy Splitwood (bass guitar) and Willy Pultz (guitar). This lineup released the single "Shoshana", the melody of which was based on Yosef Hadar's composition "Erev Shel Shoshanim". The single was very successful, Polydor Records releasing it in West Germany, France, Belgium, Netherlands, Luxembourg, Austria and Spain, and reaching No. 1 on the Morocco national radio chart. After the single release, the band performed as the opening act for Focus on their concerts in Benelux and France, as well as on several Focus concerts in West Germany. Eventually, the lineup split-up, Splitwood and Pultz continuing their career in the band Cool Breeze from Luxembourg.

In 1976, Zlatko Manojlović reformed Dah in Yugoslavia. The new lineup featured, beside the Manojlović brothers, Zdenko Pomper (bass guitar), Stevan Miutinović (drums) and Dragan Mihajlović (violin). The new lineup recorded the band's second album, Povratak (The Return), which featured a Serbo-Croatian version of "Shoshana", entitled "Šošana". Soon after the album release, the band leader Zlatko Manojlović went to serve his mandatory stint in the Yugoslav People's Army, so his brother Goran became the temporary leader of Dah. The last Dah lineup featured, beside Goran Manojlović and Zdenko Pomper, Vidoja Božinović (a former Dim Bez Vatre and Pop Mašina member, guitar) and Dušan Đukić "Đuka" (a former Immamorata and Pop Mašina member, drums). This lineup of the band performed for a year and disbanded.

=== Post breakup ===
During one of his army leaves, Manojlović recorded a highly successful single "Jednoj ženi" ("To a Woman"). In 1977, upon his return from the army, he formed the band Gordi. The first lineup of Gordi featured two former Dah members, Goran Manojlović and Stevan Milutinović. After Gordi disbanded in 1984, Manojlović dedicated himself to his solo career.

For a short period of time during 1978, Zdenko Pomper played bass guitar in Gordi. He lost his life in a street fight at the beginning of the 1980s.

In 2021, Croatia Records released a Zlatko Manojlović box set entitled Od Daha do Gordih (From Dah to Gordi), featuring a reissue of Veliki cirkus.

== Legacy ==
In 1991, Serbian and Yugoslav alternative rock band Disciplina Kičme sampled Dah song "Noćna buka" in their song "Buka u modi" ("Noise in Fashion"). In 1994, Serbian and Yugoslav pop rock band Ruž covered the song "Šošana" on their album N˚4, which was produced by Manojlović.

== Discography ==
=== Studio albums ===
- Veliki cirkus (1974)
- Povratak (1976)

=== Singles ===
- "Ako poželiš" / "Noćna buka" (1973)
- "Samo jedna noć" / "Cvrčak" (1973)
- "Gitareska" / "Ti si ta" (1974)
- "Mali princ" / "Ime" (1974)
- "Šošana" / "Please, Don't Say Nothing" (1975)
- "Žeđ" / "Misli" (1976)
- "Tomorrow" / "Under The Sky" (1977)

=== Other appearances ===
- "Ako poželiš" (BOOM Pop Fest '73, 1973)
