= Izgled =

Short-lived Yugoslav lifestyle magazine

- Editor: Vlaja Jovanović
- Categories: Pop-culture magazine
- Frequency: Monthly
- Publisher: SKC
- Country: Yugoslavia
- Language: Serbian

Izgled was a pop-culture magazine published in Belgrade, Serbia during the early 1980s. Only five issues were published.

== History ==
The magazine was published by Belgrade's SKC (student cultural centre).

In addition to editor-in-chief Vlaja Jovanović, the inaugural issue was prepared by Nebojša Pajkić and Slavica Vukadinović. For its second issue the magazine received input from painter Dragoš Kalajić. The third issue came out as a catalog for Vlaja Jovanović's art exhibition. The fourth and fifth issues were prepared by Slavko Timotijević.

Influenced by Andy Warhol and modeled after his Interview magazine, Jovanović's Izgled gathered Belgrade-based creative individuals such as designers Marko Pešić, Peđa Gavrović and Srba Travanov, musicians Miško Mihajlovski and Goran Vejvoda as well as various locally (in)famous oddballs/misfits from the city's night life such as Biljana "Bezideja" Trifunović. The magazine's concept was presenting snapshots of urban life, featuring young men and women of Belgrade who spend their mornings and early afternoons sleeping, their late afternoons engaged in artistic and creative work, and their nights partying. The magazine ran party photo spreads, featuring locally-known individuals, bands, artists etc.

Izgled and its sister magazine Vidici published photos of the embryonic Idoli conceptual band (presented at the time as VIS Dečaci), while both publications financed the recording of Idoli's debut single. Izgled functioned as a record label for the band's debut single "Pomoć, pomoć" / "Retko te viđam sa devojkama", which was included with the April 1980 issue of the Vidici magazine.
