= Goran Vejvoda =

English-born Serbian multidisciplinary artist (born 1956)

- Горан Вејвода
- Born: 1956 (age 69–70); London, England
- Occupations: Musician; composer; visual artist; photographer; journalist; actor

Goran Vejvoda (Serbian Cyrillic: Горан Вејвода; born in 1956 ) is an English-born Serbian composer, sound and visual artist, performance artist, photographer, writer and actor based in France.

== Early life ==
Son of the Yugoslav diplomat Ivo Vejvoda who had managed to parlay his prior communist revolutionary activity (including being a foreign volunteer fighter in the Spanish Civil War as well as prominent Partisan guerrilla fighter during World War II) into a post-war diplomatic career, Goran was born in London during the time his father was stationed there as FPR Yugoslavia's ambassador to the United Kingdom.

The family relocated to Rome in 1960 when his father was reassigned to be the ambassador in Italy.

In 1967, the family was on the move again, this time to Paris where his father was named as the Yugoslav ambassador to France.

Finally, in 1971 his father took an advisory job at the Yugoslav Foreign Ministry, which meant that 15-year-old Goran came to Belgrade.

== Activity ==
In the early 1980s Vejvoda briefly fronted Annoda Rouge band/project with then-girlfriend Bebi Dol on vocals, Slobodan Trbojevic on bass and Vd on drums. The band never released any official material for commercial exploitation.

Later, Vejvoda collaborated on Bebi Dol's solo hit-singles "Mustafa" and "Rudi" as well as her Ruze i krv album.

Vejvoda also worked on the studio recordings of Kozmetika, D' Boys, and VIS Idoli's seminal Odbrana i poslednji dani album (for a short time during 1982, he was the band's official member). He additionally collaborated with Šarlo akrobata members Koja and Vd on the Dečko koji obećava soundtrack as well as co-producing Elvis J. Kurtović & His Meteors' 1984 debut album Mitovi i legende o kralju Elvisu.

Simultaneously, he wrote for Džuboks and Rock music magazines, doing interviews with the likes of David Byrne, Brian Eno, etc. He published photographs in Izgled magazine and did the cover photos on Paket aranžman album as well as Električni orgazam's self-titled debut album.

With Slobodan Cicmil, Vejvoda co-wrote a book about Brian Eno called Zaobilazne strategije (Oblique strategies) published in 1986. Around the same time, Vejvoda ventured into acting - playing the role of Russian painter El Lissitzky in a TV movie Ruski umetnički eksperiment directed by Boris Miljković and Branimir Dimitrijević.

In 1985 Vejvoda moved to Paris where he continued his visual art, musical studio work, composing music for ballet, theatre, film. television, performing etc.

In 1996 he composed the music for Enki Bilal's film Tykho Moon and the original score for his 2004 film Immortel.

== Discography ==
- In The Mooncage with Suba (1986)
- Oko 3 (Barclay 1992)
- La Peau du Monde (Fairplay 1993)
- The Dreambird with Suba (Comep - Brazil - 1994)
- Mikroorganizmi with Rambo Amadeus (Komuna 1996)
- Tykho Moon (Makhno 1997)
- Le sommeil du monstre (Versailles - Sony 1998)
- Fruit Cloud (Galerie de Pop Co., Ltd - Japan - 1999)
- Harmonie (Galerie de Pop Co., Ltd - Japan - 2000)
- Zerone - What (Maat 2003)
- Immortel (Une musique de film - 2004)
- Vibrö - The Broken Tales Issue (2004)
- La chute implique d'autres sens with Claudia Huidobro (Limited edition 2007)
- A square of silence a circle of sound (Gala Ghenmar - 2007)
