= RTV Studio B =

Television broadcaster in Belgrade, Serbia

TV Studio B
- Native name: ТВ Студио Б
- Formerly: PGP Studio B
- Type: Public company
- Industry: Media
- Founded: 1 April 1970; 56 years ago (as Radio Studio B); 28 March 1990; 36 years ago (as Radio Television Studio B)
- Headquarters: Belgrade, Serbia
- Key people: Ivana Vučićević (Director)
- Services: Broadcast radio, television
- Revenue: ▲€2.76 million (2017)
- Net income: ▼ (€0.47 million) (2017)
- Total assets: ▲€0.88 million (2017)
- Total equity: €0 (2017)
- Owner: Maxim Media
- Number of employees: 145 (2017)
- Website: studiob.rs

RTV Studio B, more often called Studio B (Serbian Cyrillic: Студио Б), is a radio and television broadcaster in Belgrade, Serbia. It was the first broadcast station outside the national electronic media system and also the first stereo sound broadcasting television station in Serbia.

== Background ==
RTV Studio B broadcasts in a radius of 100 km around Belgrade, covering an area in which there are three million viewers. One notable program was "Good Morning, Belgrade" (Serbian: Beograde dobro jutro), which was launched in 1975.

== History ==
Studio B was launched as a radio station in 1970 by the journalists from the Borba group, which included Marko Janković. In 1972, it became a corporation owned by Belgrade's Municipal Council. From 1975, Duško Radović was the editor of Studio B.

Studio B became independent in April 1991, but this was reversed by a decision of the corporate court on 15 February 1996, when the last serving director of NTV Studio B, Milorad Roganović was removed from his duty, and from that day on, Studio B has served as a government-owned company. In October 1997, Zoran Ostojić was removed from the post of director and Lila Radonjić from the post of editor-in-chief of Studio B, and this was opposed by a demonstration.

In May 2000, Studio B was again taken over. On 3 December 2012, the News programme of Studio B and some other programmes have dropped the Latin script in favour of Cyrillic script.

On 19 August 2015, Studio B was sold to the Serbian media company "Maxim Media" for 530,000 euros.

== Programmes ==
=== Telenovelas / Series ===
Original name	Serbian translation	Origin
RIS Delitti Imperfetti	Nesavršeni zločini	Italy
Bitange i princeze	Bitange i princeze	Croatia
Aunque me Cueste la Vida	Sve za ljubav	Venezuela
Montecristo: Un Amor, Una Venganza	Montekristo	Argentina
La duda	Sumnja	Mexico
Géminis	Blizanci	Venezuela
Adjutants of Love	Za cara i otadžbinu	Russia
Il peccato e la vergogna	Greh i sram	Italy
L'onore e il rispetto	Čast i poštovanje	Italy
Aquí no hay quien viva	Moje drage komšije	Spain
El Internado	Internat	Spain
Un paso adelante	Korak napred	Spain
Los hombres de Paco	Pakov svet	Spain
7 vidas	Sedam života	Spain
Orgoglio	Gordost	Italy
Westenwind	Vetrovi sa zapada	Netherlands
Capri	Kapri	Italy
Sous le soleil	Pod suncem Sen Tropea	France
Los Serrano	Seranovi	Spain
Frasier	Frejžer	USA
Dream Team	Tim snova	United Kingdom
Skins	Skins	United Kingdom
Swingtown	Grad svingera	USA
Incantesimo	Opčinjeni	Italy
Le stagioni del cuore	Doba ljubavi	Italy
Elisa di Rivombrosa	Eliza	Italy
La figlia di Elisa – Ritorno a Rivombrosa	Elizina kći	Italy
Always Greener	Tuđe slađe	Australia

== See also ==
- Media in Serbia
