= YU Grupa discography =

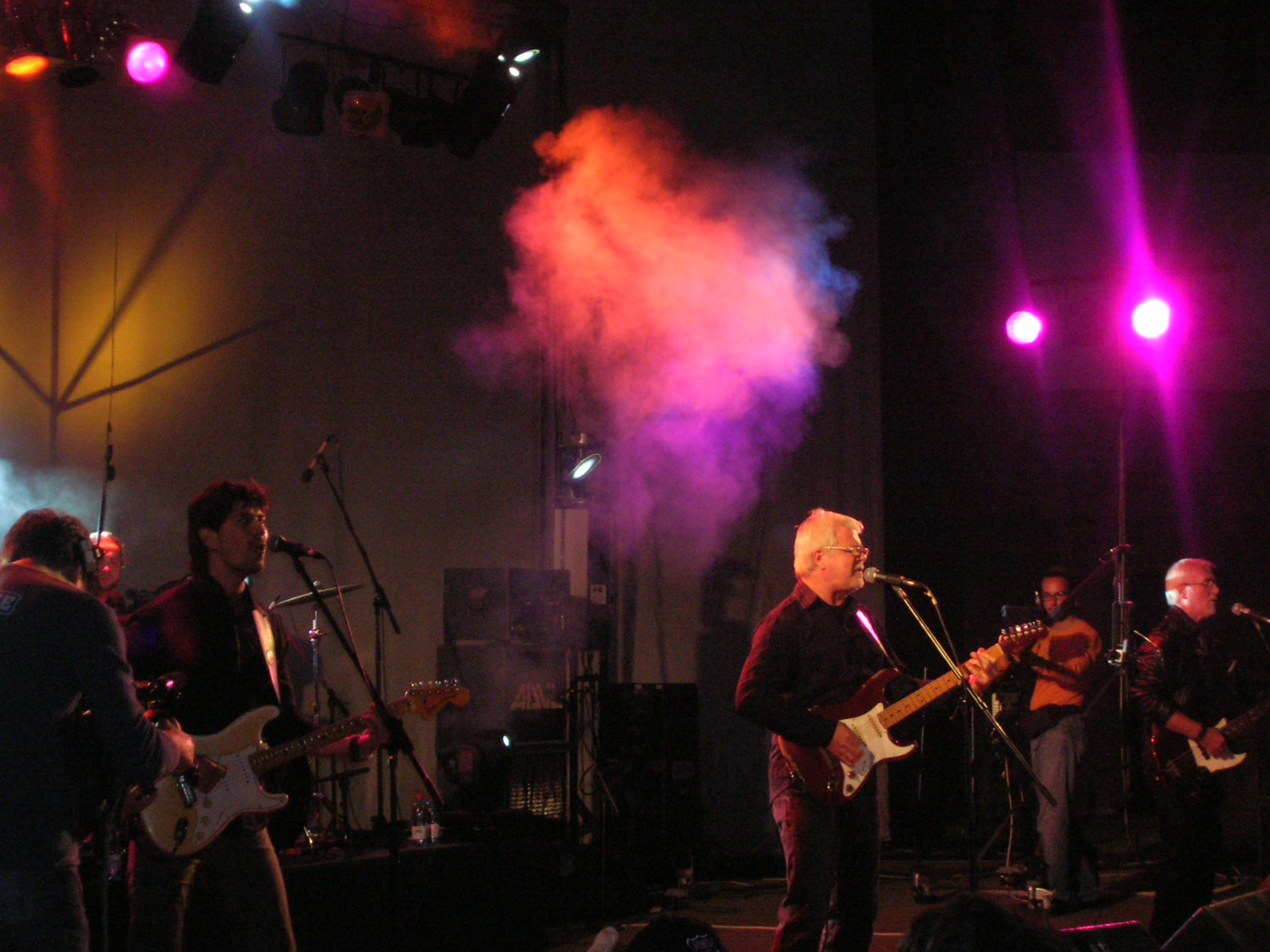
- YU Grupa performing live in Niš in 2007
- Studio albums: 10
- Live albums: 1
- Compilation albums: 2
- Singles: 10
- Various artists live albums: 2

This is the discography of Serbian and Yugoslav rock band YU Grupa. This discography consists of 10 studio albums, 1 live album, 10 7-inch singles, and 2 compilation albums. This list does not include solo material or side projects performed by the members.

== Studio albums ==
Title	Released
YU Grupa	1973
Kako to da svaki dan?	1974
YU Grupa	1975
Među zvezdama	1977
Samo napred...	1979
Od zlata jabuka	1987
Ima nade	1988
Tragovi	1990
Rim 1994	1995
Dugo znamo se	2005
Evo stojim tu	2016

== Live albums ==
Title	Released
Live	2007

== Compilation albums ==
Title	Released
YU zlato	1976
The Ultimate Collection	2009

== Singles ==
Title	Released
"Nona" / "Tatica"	1971
"Bio jednom jedan pas" / "Mali medved"	1972
"U tami disko kluba" / "Kosovski božuri"	1972
"Šta će meni vatra" / "Spusti glavu"	1973
"Drveni most" / "Živi pesak"	1974
"Sama" / "Trka"	1975
"Osveta" / "Oprosti ljubavi"	1976
"3 do 6" / "Tačno u podne"	1976
"Opasno" / "Budi sa mnom"	1978
"Identitet" / "Ideš mi na nerve"	1979

== Various artists live albums ==
Title	Released
Kongres rock majstora	1975
Legende YU Rocka	1988
