= YU zlato =

Compilation album by YU Grupa
- Released: September 1976
- Recorded: 1971–1976
- Genre: Hard rock; progressive rock; folk rock; blues rock
- Label: Jugoton

YU Grupa chronology
YU Grupa (1975)	YU zlato (1976)	Među zvezdama (1977)

1996 reissue cover

YU zlato (trans. YU Gold) is a compilation album by Serbian and former Yugoslav rock band YU Grupa, released in 1976. The album features songs from the band's 7-inch singles released in the 1971–1976 period.

YU zlato features some of the band's biggest hits: "Čudna šuma", "Šta će meni vatra", "U tami disko kluba", folk-oriented "Nona", "Kosovski božuri" and "Sama", and the cult ballad "Crni leptir". However, only two of the songs from YU zlato, "Čudna šuma" and "Crni leptir", have been, beside on a 7-inch single, published on a studio album (both on the band's 1973 self-titled debut).

The album was polled in 1998 as the 57th on the list of 100 greatest Yugoslav rock and pop albums in the book YU 100: najbolji albumi jugoslovenske rok i pop muzike (YU 100: The Best albums of Yugoslav pop and rock music).

== Track listing ==
No.	Title	Lyrics	Music	Length
1.	"Nona"	D. Jelić	D. Jelić	5:39
2.	"Kosovski božuri" ("Kosovo Peonies")	D. Jelić	D. Jelić	4:45
3.	"Sama" ("Alone")	V. Marjanović	M. Kostić	4:10
4.	"Čudna šuma" ("Strange Forest")	D. Nedimović	D. Jelić	3:43
5.	"Bio jedan pas" ("There Once Was a Dog")	P. Nik	M. Kostić	3:13
6.	"Tatica" ("Daddy")	D. Jelić	D. Jelić	4:03
7.	"Šta će meni vatra" ("I Don't Need No Fire")	B. Marušić	D. Jelić	4:33
8.	"U tami disko kluba" ("In the Darkness of Discothèque")	Z. Modli	D. Jelić	4:09
9.	"Crni leptir" ("Black Butterfly")	D. Jelić	D. Jelić	3:53
10.	"Živi pesak" ("Quicksand")	D. Ćućuz	M. Kostić	4:53

=== 1996 reissue bonus tracks ===
No.	Title	Lyrics	Music	Length
11.	"Trenutak sna" ("A Moment of Dream")	D. Nedimović	D. Jelić	4:21
12.	"Devojko mala" ("Little Girl")	D. Nedimović	D. Jelić	3:53
13.	"More" ("The Sea")	D. Nedimović	D. Jelić	5:39

== Credits ==
- Dragi Jelić – guitar, vocals
- Žika Jelić – bass guitar, vocals
- Miodrag Okrugić – organ
- Velibor Bogdanović – drums
- Bata Kostić – guitar
- Ratislav Đelmaš – drums

== Reissues ==
In 1996, the album was reissued on CD by the Hi-Fi Centar record label. The rerelease featured three bonus tracks, "Trenutak sna", "Devojko mala" and "More", all three from the bands 1973 debut album, and an alternate cover. The cover featured a photograph originally used on a cover of the band's 1975 self-titled album.

== Legacy ==
The album was polled in 1998 as the 57th on the list of 100 greatest Yugoslav rock and pop albums in the book YU 100: najbolji albumi jugoslovenske rok i pop muzike (YU 100: The Best albums of Yugoslav pop and rock music).
