= Tragovi =

Studio album by YU Grupa
- Released: 1990
- Genre: Hard rock; folk rock
- Length: 33:43
- Label: PGP-RTB
- Producer: Saša Habić

YU Grupa chronology
Ima nade (1988)	Tragovi (1990)	Rim 1994 (1995)

Professional ratings
Review scores
Source	Rating
Ritam	3/5 stars

Tragovi (trans. Traces) is the eighth studio album by the Serbian and former Yugoslav rock band YU Grupa.

The album marked the return of drummer Ratislav Đelmaš into the band. It is the first album he recorded with the band since YU Grupa in 1975.

== Track listing ==
The music was written by Žika and Dragi Jelić and lyrics by Nikola Čuturilo.

1. "Kome se raduješ" – 3:12
2. "Samo ponekad" – 2:57
3. "Posle snegova nema tragova" – 3:20
4. "Santa leda" – 3:52
5. "Otkad nemam te" - 3:30
6. "Sviram" – 4:17
7. "Tamni kapci" – 4:24
8. "Grad snova" – 4:14
9. "Bluz na tri-četiri" – 3:57

== Personnel ==
- Dragi Jelić - guitar, vocals
- Žika Jelić - bass guitar
- Bata Kostić - guitar
- Ratislav Đelmaš - drums

=== Guest musicians ===
- Saša Lokner - keyboards
- Nikola Čuturilo - backing vocals
- Pera Joe - harmonica
