= Među zvezdama =

Studio album by YU Grupa
- Released: 1977
- Recorded: 1977
- Genre: Hard rock; progressive rock; folk rock; blues rock
- Length: 35:29
- Label: Jugoton
- Producer: Siniša Škarica; Dragi Jelić

YU Grupa chronology
YU zlato (1976)	Među zvezdama (1977)	Samo napred... (1979)

Među zvezdama (trans. Among the Stars) is the fourth studio album from Serbian and former Yugoslav rock band YU Grupa.

Među zvezdama is the band's first album recorded with guitarist Nedžat Maculja and drummer Dragan Micić, who replaced Ratislav Đelmaš. The album features former member Bata Kostić as guest.

== Track listing ==
No.	Title	Lyrics	Music	Length
1.	"Među zvezdama" ("Among the Stars")	D. Jelić	D. Jelić	2:44
2.	"Majko, žedan sam" ("I'm Thirsty, Mother")	M. Tucaković	M. Kostić	3:41
3.	"Pevaj i ti" ("You Too Should Sing")	D. Jelić	D. Jelić	2:33
4.	"Budi sa mnom" ("Be with Me")	D. Jelić	N. Maculja	5:23
5.	"Ne znam ni sam šta da ti dam" ("I Don't Know What to Give You")	D. Jelić	D. Jelić	3:37
6.	"Opasno" ("Dangerous")	M. Tucaković	M. Kostić	4:02
7.	"Razlog više da postojim" ("A Reason More to Exist")	M. Tucaković	M. Kostić	3:20
8.	"Galebov let" ("Seagull's Flight")	Z. Modli	D. Jelić	4:30
9.	"Poleti ptico" ("Fly, Bird")	M. Tucaković	M. Kostić	5:39

== Personnel ==
- Dragi Jelić - guitar, vocals
- Žika Jelić - bass guitar
- Nedžat Maculja - guitar
- Dragan Micić - drums

=== Guest musicians ===
- Bata Kostić - guitar

=== Additional personnel ===
- Siniša Škarica - producer
- Franjo Berner - engineer
- Mladen Rukavec - engineer
- Branko Podbrežnički - recorded by
- Danko Polić - design
- Zoran Kršljanin - photography
