= The Ultimate Collection (YU Grupa album) =

Compilation album by YU Grupa
- Released: 2009
- Recorded: 1972–1977
- Genre: Hard rock; progressive rock; folk rock; blues rock
- Label: Croatia Records

YU Grupa chronology
| Live (2007) | The Ultimate Collection (2009) | Evo stojim tu (2016) |

Professional ratings
Review scores
| Source | Rating |
|---|---|
| Muzika.hr | link |

The Ultimate Collection is a double compilation album by Serbian and former Yugoslav rock band YU Grupa.

The album was released in 2009 by Croatia Records, a successor company for Jugoton, which was YU Grupa's record label during the 1972 – 1977 period, and the album features songs from the albums and 7" singles YU Grupa released through Jugoton during this period.

== Track listing ==
=== Disc One ===
1. "Mali medved" (D. Jelić) – 5:40
2. "Bio jednom jedan pas" (M. Kostić) – 3:10
3. "U tami disko kluba" (D. Jelić, Z. Modli) – 4:11
4. "Kosovski božuri" (M. Kostić) – 4:43
5. "Šta će meni vatra" (D. Jelić, B. Marušić) – 4:38
6. "Trka" (D. Jelić, D. Nedimović) – 4:39
7. "Noć je moja" (D. Jelić, B. Marušić) – 5:44
8. "Čovek i marsovac" (D. Jelić, D. Nedimović) – 3:33
9. "Čudna šuma" (D. Jelić, D. Nedimović) – 3:34
10. "Devojko mala, podigni glavu" (D. Jelić, D. Nedimović) – 3:48
11. "Crni leptir" (D. Jelić) – 3:52
12. "More" (D. Jelić, D. Nedimović) – 5:43
13. "Drveni most" (D. Jelić) – 4:39
14. "Kako to" (D. Jelić, B, Marušić) – 4:38
15. "Ništa nema novo" (D. Jelić, B, Marušić) – 6:44
16. "More no. 2" (D. Jelić, B, Marušić) – 8:10

=== Disc Two ===
1. "Sama" (M. Kostić, V. Marjanović) – 4:11
2. "Živi pesak" (M. Kostić, P. Ćućuz) – 4:55
3. "Možda ti, možda ja" (D. Jelić, M. Tucaković) – 4:17
4. "Oprosti ljubavi" (D. Jelić, M. Tucaković) – 3:59
5. "Čovek kao ja" (D. Jelić, M. Tucaković, R. Đelmaš) – 3:37
6. "Ja moram dalje" (D. Jelić, M. Tucaković, R. Đelmaš) – 3:01
7. "Kad" (D. Jelić, M. Tucaković, Ž. Jelić) – 3:31
8. "Tačno u podne" (D. Jelić, Z. Modli) – 3:15
9. "3 do 6" (D. Jelić, M. Tucaković) – 3:27
10. "Među zvezdama" (D. Jelić) – 2:53
11. "Majko, žedan sam" (M. Kostić, M. Tucaković) – 3:51
12. "Budi sa mnom" (N. Maculja, D. Jelić) – 3:35
13. "Ne znam ni sam šta da ti dam" (D. Jelić) – 3:48
14. "Opasno (Opasno te volim)" (M. Kostić, M. Tucaković) – 4:12
15. "Razlog više da postojim" (M. Kostić, M. Tucaković) – 3:33
16. "Galebov let" (D. Jelić, Z. Modli) – 4:43
17. "Ideš mi na nerve" (M. Kostić, D. Jelić, M. Tucaković) – 3:50
18. "Identitet" (M. Kostić, M. Tucaković) – 3:50

== Credits ==
- Dragi Jelić – guitar, vocals
- Žika Jelić – bass guitar, vocals
- Bata Kostić – guitar
- Nedžat Maculja – guitar
- Miodrag Okrugić – organ
- Velibor Bogdanović – drums
- Ratislav Đelmaš – drums
- Dragan Micić – drums
