= Od zlata jabuka =

Studio album by YU Grupa
- Released: 1987
- Genre: Hard rock; folk rock
- Length: 29:17
- Label: ZKP RTLJ
- Producer: Bata Kostić; Dragi Jelić

YU Grupa chronology
Samo napred... (1979)	Od zlata jabuka (1987)	Ima nade (1988)

Od zlata jabuka (trans. Golden Apple) is the sixth studio album from Serbian and former Yugoslav rock band YU Grupa. Od zlata jabuka, released in 1987, is the band's first album since they reunited the same year.

The album cover features a detail from Albrecht Dürer's painting Adam and Eve.

== Track listing ==
1. "Od zlata jabuka" (Kostić, Raičević, Telalović) – 3:31
2. "Pogled sa šanka" (Jelić, Čuturilo) – 2:07
3. "Zvuk na vratima" (Jelić, Čuturilo) – 3:32
4. "Neko mi treba" (Jelić, Čuturilo) – 2:24
5. "Magla" (Jelić, Telalović) - 2:57
6. "Ulica kestena" (Jelić, Kostić, Čuturilo) – 4:19
7. "Kalibar 86" (Jelić, Telalović) – 3:15
8. "Ti si otrov moj" (Jelić, Kostić, Čuturilo) – 3:28
9. "Slomljeni od istine" (Jelić, Čuturilo) – 3:05

== Personnel ==
- Dragi Jelić - guitar, vocals
- Žika Jelić - bass guitar
- Bata Kostić - guitar
- Velibor Bogdanović - drums

=== Guest musicians ===
- Saša Lokner - keyboards
- Nikola Čuturilo - backing vocals
- Vladimir Golubović - drums (on "Magle")
