= Džentlmeni =

Yugoslav rock band (1966–1972)

- Džentlmeni in 1967 on the Hvar island, from left to right: Branko "Čutura" Marušić, Mihajlo Simikić, Dragi Jelić, Žika Jelić, and Velibor "Boka" Bogdanović

Background information
- Origin: Belgrade, SR Serbia, SFR Yugoslavia
- Genres: Beat music; rhythm and blues; rock
- Years active: 1966–1972
- Labels: PGP-RTB, PGP-RTS
- Past members: Slobodan Todorović; Živorad Jelić; Milorad Novak; Velibor Bogdanović; Mihajlo Simikić; Branko Marušić; Dragan Jelić; Zlatko Manojlović; Robert Nemeček; Dušan Banović; Zoran Božinović; Dušan Petrović; Slađana Milošević

Džentlmeni (Serbian Cyrillic: Џентлмени, lit. 'The Gentlemen') were a Yugoslav rock band formed in Belgrade in 1966.

A year after the formation, the band split into two factions. The first faction featured original rhythm guitarist Milorad Novak, and the other featured original bass guitarist Živorad "Žika" Jelić and drummer Velibor "Boka" Bogdanović, the first faction disbanding after less than a year, and the second continuing their career with Žika Jelić's brother Dragan "Dragi" Jelić (guitar), Mihajlo Simikić (tenor saxophone, clarinet, piano and vocals), and Branko Marušić "Čutura" (vocals, rhythm guitar), achieving nationwide popularity and eventually becoming one of the most popular Yugoslav bands of the 1960s. In 1970 the Jelić brothers departed from the group and formed highly successful YU Grupa, while Marušić continued to lead Džentlmeni, which changed several lineups. Džentlmeni later lineups included prominent musicians like Zlatko Manojlović, Robert Nemeček, Zoran Božinović and Slađana Milošević, the group finally disbanding in 1972. Although they were not among the earliest Yugoslav rock bands, Džentlmeni, as other Yugoslav 1960s rock bands, played a pioneering role on the Yugoslav rock scene.

== History ==
=== Band formation and split into two factions (1966–1967) ===
The band was formed in 1966 by former Sveci (The Saints) member Slobodan Todorović (guitar and vocals), former Albatrosi (The Albatrosses) and Alasi (The Fishermen) member Živorad "Žika" Jelić (bass guitar), former Sveci member Milorad Novak (rhythm guitar) and Velibor "Boka" Bogdanović (drums). The members got the inspiration for the name Džentlmeni from the import textile shop Gentlemen in Belgrade's Knez Mihailova Street, although they also considered Jelić's suggestion of naming the band Žetoni (The Tokens).

The band's original lineup performed until April 1967, when Todorović moved to Siluete, later moving to the band CD. Following Todorović's departure, the rest of the members split into two factions. The first featured Milorad Novak and former members of the band Vihori (The Winds), Branko Stefanović (vocals), Đorđe Doksas (solo guitar), Moma Lukić (drums) and Dušan Ćućuz (bass guitar, later of Tako fame). This lineup performed under the moniker Džentlmeni for less than a year, mainly at local dance parties, before disbanding at the end of 1967 due to Novak's mandatory stint in the Yugoslav army. The other faction, featuring Bogdanović and Jelić, continued working with Mihajlo Simikić (tenor saxophone, clarinet, piano and vocals), a former Iskre and Alasi member Branko Marušić "Čutura" (vocals, rhythm guitar) and Žika Jelić's brother Dragan "Dragi" Jelić (vocals, guitar), the latter previously playing with the bands Alasi, Beduini (The Bedouins) and Siluete. This lineup had a diverse repertoire, playing beat and rhythm and blues, performing covers of songs by Tom Jones, The Walker Brothers, The Animals, Wilson Pickett, The Jimi Hendrix Experience and other artists, as well as their own material, based on polyphonic singing.

=== The mainstay Džentlmeni (1967–1972) ===
During the summer of 1967, the band had an Adriatic coast tour, performing for several months at the isle Hvar and several other resorts. The frequent live performances provided the band with a status of a leading live act in Belgrade and large media attention, which gave them an opportunity to perform as the opening act for Italian singer Caterina Caselli on her concerts in Belgrade, Zagreb, Karlovac and Ljubljana. After these concerts, they had a joined concert with Indexi in Sarajevo and recorded the song "Ne, ne trebam te više" ("No, I Don't Need You Anymore"), written by Đorđe Novković, for the Radio Sarajevo show Vaš šlager sezone (Your Schlager of the Season).

In 1968, the band performed at the prominent Youth Festival in Subotica. On the festival, they performed the songs "Veseli svet" ("Cheerful World"), written by Đorđe Uzelac, and "Naša mladost" ("Our Youth"), written by the band members themselves. The song "Veseli svet" was released on the festival's official compilation. During the year, the band appeared at another major festival, the Belgrade Spring festival, with the song "To je tvoj stil" ("It's Your Style"), written by Vojkan Borisavljević. The song was included on the band's 1968 debut extended play Idi (Go), featuring the title track, which was a cover of Sandie Shaw single "Today", "Naša mladost" and "Slatko" ("Sweet"), which was a cover of The Drifters hit "Sweets for My Sweet". The EP was well received by the Yugoslav music press.

In 1969, the band once again appeared at the Belgrade Spring Festival, with the song "Korak ka suncu" ("A Step towards the Sun"), written by Radoslav Graić, and the song was released by PGP-RTB on the festival's official compilation. Later during the year, the band released their second EP, Slomljena srca (Broken Hearts), featuring the title track, which was a cover version of the Don Gibson single "Sea of Heartbreak", Dragi Jelić's song "Kraj snova" ("The End of Dreams"), "Helule Helule", originally performed by The Tremeloes, and Branko Marušić's song "Nisi došla" ("You Haven't Come"). The title track became a large hit for the band.

At the end of the decade, Džentlmeni were at the peak of their popularity; the press described them as the most popular band from Belgrade, and they performed as the backing band for popular singers Lidija Kordić and Daliborka Stojšić. However, quarrels in the band became more and more frequent, as the Jelić brothers wanted to move towards progressive rock. In 1970 appeared the band's final release, the single "Ona je moja" ("She Is Mine"), a cover version of the song "34-06" by The Dave Clark Five, with "Da li su važne reči?" ("Do Words Matter?"), a cover version of the song "There's a Better Day a Comin'" by Crazy Elephant, as the B-side.

After the single release, the Jelić brothers and Velibor Bogdanović, with keyboard player Miodrag "Mive" Okrugić, formed the progressive/hard rock band YU Grupa. Marušić continued leading Džentlmeni, in the lineup featuring former Helios member Zlatko Manojlović (guitar, later of Dah and Gordi), former Dogovor iz 1804. member Robert Nemeček (bass guitar, later of Pop Mašina and Rok Mašina), and former Zlatni Dečaci member Dušan Banović (drums). However, the band had frequent lineup changes, with some of the musicians performing with the band's different lineups including guitarist Zoran Božinović (later of Pop Mašina, Rok Mašina and Zona B) and bassists Dušan Petrović (later of Generacija 5) and Slađana Milošević (later a highly successful solo artist). The group finally disbanded in 1972.

=== Post breakup ===
After Džentlmeni disbanded, Marušić formed the band Dah with Zlatko Manojlović. After he left Dah, Marušić dedicated himself to his solo career.

The song "Naša mladost" appeared on the various artists compilation 20 godina festivala "Omladina" (20 Years of Youth Festival), released for the Subotica Youth Festival 20th anniversary in 1981. The song "Slomljena srca" appeared on the various artists compilation YU retrospektiva – Sjaj izgubljene ljubavi (YU Retrospective – A Lost Love Spark), released by Komuna in 1994, and the box set various artists compilation Kad je rock bio mlad – Priče sa istočne strane (1956-1970) (When Rock Was Young – East Side Stories (1956-1970)), released by Croatia Records in 2005 and featuring works by pioneering acts of the Yugoslav rock scene.

During 2006, the band's band discography was remastered and reissued by PGP-RTS on the compilation album Retrologija (Retrology). The album also included a live recording of "Dani sreće" ("Days of Happiness"), a cover of "Hi Ho Silver Lining", from an early career television performance, as well as "Slomljena srca" and "Kuća bez broja" ("House without a Number") from Marušić's 1994 unplugged performance as bonus.

The band's original vocalist Slobodan Todorović died in May 2008. Branko Marušić died on 17 February 2021.

== Legacy ==
The song "Slomljena srca" appeared in the 1998 hit film Barking at the Stars, directed by Zdravko Šotra.

== Discography ==
=== Extended plays ===
- Idi (1968)
- Slomljena srca (1969)

=== Singles ===
- "Ona je moja" / "Da li su važne reči" (1970)

=== Compilation albums ===
- Retrologija (2006)

=== Other appearances ===
- "Veseli svet" (Omladina '68; 1968)
- "Korak ka Suncu" (Beogradsko proleće '69; 1969)
