= Kako to da svaki dan? =

Studio album by YU Grupa
- Released: 1974
- Genre: Hard rock; progressive rock; blues rock
- Length: 35:11
- Label: Jugoton
- Producer: YU Grupa

YU Grupa chronology
YU Grupa (1973)	Kako to da svaki dan? (1974)	YU Grupa (1975)

Kako to da svaki dan? (trans. How Come Every Day?) is the second studio album from Serbian and former Yugoslav rock band YU Grupa.

== Album cover ==
The album cover, designed by D. Krstić, features a photograph of brothers Žika and Dragi Jelić (members of the band) as children.

== Track listing ==
No.	Title	Length
1.	"Kako to da svaki dan?" ("How Come Every Day?")	3:58
2.	"Život njen" ("Her Life")	3:05
3.	"Ništa nema novo" ("Nothing New")	6:41
4.	"Balada o YU Grupi" ("The Ballad of YU Grupa")	3:25
5.	"Zar je ljubav to" ("Is That Love")	3:03
6.	"Mala Džoj" ("Little Joy")	3:21
7.	"More No.2" ("The Sea No.2")	7:57
8.	"Laž" ("Lie")	3:41

== Personnel ==
- Dragi Jelić - guitar, synthesizer, vocals
- Bata Kostić - guitar, organ, backing vocals
- Žika Jelić - bass guitar, backing vocals
- Ratislav Đelmaš - drums, percussion

=== Additional personnel ===
- Dragan Balać - recorded by
