= Generacija 5 =

Serbian band

- Origin: Belgrade, Serbia
- Genres: Jazz rock (early); hard rock; arena rock
- Years active: 1977–1982; 1992–present
- Labels: PGP-RTB, PGP-RTS
- Members: Dragoljub Ilić; Dragan Jovanović; Miloš Bajat; Radoš Ćapin
- Past members: Jovan Rašić; Dušan Petrović; Slobodan Đorđević; Miloš Stojisavljević; Goran Milošević; Đorđe David; Zoran Radovanović; Dragan Panjak

Generacija 5 (Serbian Cyrillic: Генерација 5; trans. Generation 5) is a Serbian and Yugoslav rock band formed in Belgrade in 1977.

The mainstay members of the band are keyboardist and band leader Dragoljub Ilić and guitarist Dragan Jovanović. At the beginning of their career the band performed jazz rock. With the arrival of vocalist Goran Milošević, the band moved to hard rock, releasing a number of hits during the late 1970s and early 1980s, disbanding in 1982. In 1985, former members of the band played a pivotal role in YU Rock Misija, the Yugoslav contribution to Live Aid. The band reunited in 1982, releasing two studio albums since.

== Band history ==
=== 1977–1982 ===
Generacija 5 was officially formed on 1 July 1977, by Dragoljub "Dragan" Ilić (a former Korak member, keyboards), Jovan Rašić (a former Zlatni Prsti member, vocals), Dragan "Krle" Jovanović (a former Zdravo member, guitar), Dušan "Duda" Petrović (a former Pop Mašina member, bass guitar) and Slobodan "Boban" Đorđević (a former Korak member, drums). The band was named after a suggestion by Dragan Ilić's brother, composer and former San leader Aleksandar "Sanja" Ilić; after reading a newspaper article about fifth generation computers, Sanja Ilić suggested the name Generacija 5.

The band released their debut jazz rock-oriented 7-inch single with songs "Novi život" ("New Life") and "Izgubljeni san" ("Lost Dream") in May 1978. After the single release, they performed on the rock evening of the prominent Subotica Youth Festival. The band was praised by members of other Yugoslav bands for their musicianship, although part of the Yugoslav music press criticized the band for their banal lyrics and for dedicating more attention to the quality of their performance than to quality of song themselves. In June of the same year, Petrović left the band due to his mandatory stint in the Yugoslav army, and was temporarily replaced by Miloš "Cajger" Stojisavljević. Upon his return from the army in May 1979, Petrović rejoined the band. In 1979, Generacija 5 released their second 7-inch single, with songs "Svemu dođe kraj" ("Everything Comes to an End") and "Noćni mir" ("Night Peace"). With "Noćni mir" they maintained their jazz rock orientation, but "Svemu dođe kraj" featured harder sound, marking the beginning of their shift towards hard rock. After the single release, they performed at the Opatija Music Festival, winning the Best Use of Traditional Music Elements Award. Their songs "Ponekad poželim i ja, da se vrate jutra" ("Sometimes I Wish for Those Mornings to Come Back") and "Svemu dođe kraj" were released on the festival's official compilation album Opatija 79 – rock grupe (Opatija 79 – Rock Bands).

In October 1979, Rašić left the band. He would dedicate himself to his career of pediatric dentist, performing occasionally with local bands Feeling, VIS Doktori, and Zaart Band. He was replaced by former Zebra member Goran Milošević (brother of female rock singer Slađana Milošević), with whom the band moved towards more commercial sound. In November 1979 they released their third 7-inch single, featuring "Umoran od svega" ("Tired of Everything") and their cult ballad "Ti samo budi dovoljno daleko" ("You Just Be Far Away Enough"). During the same year, their music was used in Zoran Čalić's hit movie Foolish Years.

The band released their debut self-titled album, produced by Josip Boček, in 1980. The songs were composed by the band members, with the exception of the ballad "Pseto" ("Dog"), composed by Kornelije Kovač, and the lyrics were written by Ilić, Bora Đorđević and Marina Tucaković. The album brought the hits "Dolazim za 5 minuta" ("I'll Be Back In 5 Minutes"), "Ti i ja" ("You And Me"), "Rođen na asfaltu" ("Born on the Asphalt") and "Pseto". The band's second album, entitled Dubler (Doubler), was produced by Peter Taggart and released in 1982. Although the album brought several hit songs, the band did not manage to maintain their popularity at the time of great popularity of Yugoslav new wave bands and disbanded in June 1982.

=== Post breakup ===
After the disbandment, Ilić became a music editor for Radio Television Belgrade, and in 1989 started working as an editor for PGP-RTB record label. During the 1980s he composed songs for Željko Bebek, Slađana Milošević and other acts. Đorđević moved to the United States of America, Jovanović became a studio musician and Milošević joined the band Mama Co Co, performing with them for a while before withdrawing from the scene, making a comeback in 1997 with the album Da li još misliš na mene (Are You Still Thinking of Me).

In 1985, Ilić wrote the song "Za milion godina" recorded by YU Rock Misija, the Yugoslav contribution to Live Aid, and Ilić, Dragan Jovanović, Dušan Petrović and Slobodan Đorđević reunited to take part in the song recording.

=== 1992–present ===
Generacija 5 reunited in 1992. Besides Dragan Ilić on keyboards, Dragan Jovanović on guitar and Miloš Stojisavljević on bass guitar, the band's new lineup featured the singer Đorđe David Nikolić, a former member of the band Ratnici and a graduate from the Belgrade Faculty of Dramatic Arts, and drummer Zoran Radovanović, formerly of Čutura i Oblaci. In 1994, the band released the compilation album Generacija 5 '78–'94, which featured their old hits, an unplugged version of "Ti samo budi dovoljno daleko" and two new songs, "Najjači samo ostaju" ("Only The Strongest Survive") and "Povedi me u noć" ("Take Me into the Night").

Their comeback album Svet je tvoj (The World Is Yours), released in 1997, was recorded in Belgrade and Los Angeles. In Belgrade they worked in studio with former Warriors member Dragan Deletić and in Los Angeles they were joined by their former member Slobodan Đorđević. The album was produced by Oliver Jovanović and band members themselves. The songs were composed by Ilić and Jovanović, and the songs lyrics were written by film and television director Miloš Radović, former of Grupa I member Branko Bogićević and the group's former singer Goran Milošević. The song "Nosi je košava" ("Košava Carries Her") featured lyrics written by deceased Nenad Radulović, former frontman of the band Poslednja Igra Leptira. The album featured guest appearances by American rapper Baby Q Ball, singers Maja Odžaklijevska and Lana Toković, and Ljuba Dimitrijević (of the ensemble Renesans) on crumhorn. The album also featured recordings from Generacija 5 unplugged concert held in Television Belgrade Studio 9 in 1995 as bonus tracks. During their staying in Los Angeles, the band performed at the Roxy Theatre.

At the beginning of 2000, Đorđe David was excluded from the band, Dragan Panjak becoming the band's new vocalist. He recorded only one song with the band, the ballad "Pomoli se još jednom..." ("Say One More Prayer..."). The song, composed by Ilić and with lyrics written by Alka Vuica, was originally recorded in 1984 by singer Željko Bebek. Generacija 5 version was released on the compilation album Pomoli se još jednom... i druge balade (Say One more Prayer... and Other Ballads) in 2000. In 2002, the band released the album Unplugged & Live, which featured the recordings from the 1995 Television Belgrade Studio 9 unplugged concert. The album, besides the band's hits in acoustic arrangements, featured an unplugged cover of Time song "Istina mašina" ("Truth Machine"). The band's original bass guitarist Dušan Petrović died on October 17, 2003.

In 2006, the band released their fourth studio album, Energija (Energy), produced by Saša Habić. The album featured, besides Ilić, Krstić and Stojisavljević, Slobodan Đorđević on drums, and, as guest vocalist, former Smak singer Dejan "Najda" Najdanović. Part of the album lyrics were written by Bebi Dol and Van Gogh frontman Zvonimir Đukić "Đule", and the song "Na krilima" ("On the Wings") featured Irish singer Mary Black on backing vocals. On the promotional concerts, the band performed with Najdanović as vocalist.

In December 2011, the band reunited in the 1978 lineup, with Ilić on keyboards, Jovanović on guitar, Stojisavljević on bass guitar, Đorđević on drums, and the band's original vocalist Jovan Rašić, to perform at the 50th anniversary of Subotica Youth Festival. Since 2013, Đorđević was, due to the fact that he still resides in the United States, on some concerts replaced by Kerber drummer Josip "Joško" Hartl on drums.

In November 2016, the band released the single "Opasna po život" ("Deadly"), featuring lyrics written by Zvonimir Đukić, recorded with the new vocalist, Miloš Bajat. The band celebrated their 44th anniversary with a concert in Belgrade Youth Center, performing with the new drummer Radoš Ćapin. They celebrated their 45th anniversary with the single "Freedom", released in November 2022, and a concert in Belgrade's Trade Union Hall, held on 8 December 2022, featuring former Korni Grupa and Time frontman and solo artist Dado Topić and Riblja Čorba frontman Bora Đorđević and children's choir Horislavci as guests.

Miloš Stojisavljević "Cajger" died on 29 January 2024, after long illness. In May 2024, the band released the single "Ja verujem" ("I Believe"), featuring Dado Topić on vocals. The band dedicated the song to deceased Stojisavljević. Following the single release, Generacija 5 and Topić held a series of joint concerts. In December 2024, prior to their New Year's Eve concert in Kragujevac, the band members publicly supported the 2024 Serbian anti-corruption protests.

== Legacy ==
The song "Svemu dođe kraj" was covered by Radio Television Novi Sad Big Band on their 1980 self-titled album. The song "Ti samo budi dovoljno daleko" was covered by singer-songwriter Srđan Marjanović on his 1989 album Ako jednom puknem ja (If I Go into Pieces One Day).

In 2000, the song "Dolazim za pet minuta" was polled No.53 on Rock Express Top 100 Yugoslav Rock Songs of All Times list. In 2011, the same song was polled, by the listeners of Radio 202, one of 60 greatest songs released by PGP-RTB/PGP-RTS during the sixty years of the label's existence.

== Discography ==
=== Studio albums ===
- Generacija 5 (1980)
- Dubler (1982)
- Svet je tvoj (1997)
- Energija (2006)

=== Live albums ===
- Unplugged & Live (2002)

=== Compilations ===
- Generacija 5 78–94 (1994)
- Pomoli se još jednom... (2000)

=== Singles ===
- "Novi život" / "Izgubljeni san" (1978)
- "Svemu dođe kraj" / "Noćni mir" (1979)
- "Umoran od svega" / "Ti samo budi dovoljno daleko" (1979)
- "Spakuj se, požuri" / "Samo laži" (1981)
- "Opasna po život" (2016)
