= Ima nade =

Studio album by YU Grupa
- Released: 1988
- Recorded: Studio V PGP-RTB, Belgrade; 1988
- Genre: Hard rock; folk rock
- Length: 27:36
- Label: PGP-RTB
- Producer: Saša Habić

YU Grupa chronology
| Od zlata jabuka (1987) | Ima nade (1988) | Tragovi (1990) |

Ima nade (trans. There Is Hope) is the seventh studio album from Serbian and former Yugoslav rock band YU Grupa.

The ballad "Dunavom šibaju vetrovi" is notable for being one of the two YU Grupa songs sung by the bass guitarist Žika Jelić (the other one being the ballad "Crni leptir" from the band's 1973 debut album). The refrain of "Dunavom šibaju vetrovi", however, is sung by the band's guitarist and vocalist Dragi Jelić.

== Track listing ==
1. "Zaboravi" (M. Kostić, N. Čuturilo) – 3:21
2. "Divlja mašina" (D. Jelić, N. Čuturilo) – 3:20
3. "Mornar" (D. Jelić, N. Čuturilo) – 3:38
4. "Dunavom šibaju vetrovi" (D. Jelić, N. Čuturilo) – 3:44
5. "Ima nade" (M. Kostić, B. Telalović) - 2:47
6. "Vodi me kući" (D. Jelić, M. Kostić, N. Čuturilo) – 4:45
7. "Moj stari bend" (M. Kostić, N. Čuturilo) – 3:20
8. "Impuls" (M. Kostić, B. Telalović) – 2:58

== Personnel ==
- Dragi Jelić - guitar, vocals
- Žika Jelić - bass guitar
- Bata Kostić - guitar
- Velibor Bogdanović - drums

=== Guest musicians ===
- Dragan Ilić - keyboards
- Saša Lokner - keyboards
- Nikola Čuturilo - backing vocals
- Vladimir Golubović - drums
- Nenad Jelić - percussion

== Legacy ==
In 2011, the song "Mornar" was voted, by the listeners of Radio 202, one of the 60 greatest songs released by PGP-RTB/PGP-RTS during the sixty years of the label's existence.
