= Dragoljub Ilić =

- Born: 1956; Belgrade, PR Serbia, FPR Yugoslavia
- Genres: Jazz rock; hard rock; arena rock; classical music
- Occupations: Keyboardist; songwriter; composer
- Instrument: Keyboards
- Years active: Mid-1970s–present
- Labels: PGP-RTB, PGP-RTS, Active Time

Dragoljub "Dragan" Ilić (Serbian Cyrillic: Драгољуб-Драган Илић; born 1956) is a Serbian and Yugoslav musician, songwriter, and composer, best known as the leader of the rock band Generacija 5 and for his pivotal role in YU Rock Misija, the Yugoslav contribution to Live Aid campaign. In addition to his career as a rock musician and songwriter, Ilić is known for his work as composer of classical, popular and film music. He is the brother of late composer Aleksandar "Sanja" Ilić.

== Musical career ==
=== Early career ===
Ilić started his career in the mid-1970s. Prior to forming Generacija 5, he performed with the band Korak (Step).

=== Generacija 5 ===
Ilić formed Generacija in July 1977 with vocalist Jovan Rašić, guitarist Dragan "Krle" Jovanović, bass guitarist Dušan "Duda" Petrović and drummer Boban Đorđević. Initially a jazz rock group, Generacija 5 gained nationwide popularity with their switch to arena rock sound with the arrival of vocalist Goran Milošević in 1979. The band released two studio albums and a number of 7-inch singles before disbanding in 1982. The group reunited in 1992, releasing two studio albums, a live album and several new songs on different compilation albums since.

=== YU Rock Misija ===
Ilić played a pivotal role in YU Rock Misija, the Yugoslav contribution to Live Aid. He co-wrote the charity song "Za milion godina" ("For a Million Years") with lyricist Mladen Popović. The song was recorded by a group of prominent musicians of the Yugoslav rock scene, Generacija 5 members reuniting for the song recording.

=== Other works ===
As a songwriter, Ilić has cooperated with a number of prominent acts of the Yugoslav and post-Yugoslav scenes, including Slađana Milošević, Željko Bebek and others.

Ilić has written over 100 pieces of classical music and theatre, film, and television music. The music he wrote for the TV series Nemanjić Dynasty: The Birth of the Kingdom was released in 2017 on a soundtrack album. He has performed in Prague, Stockholm, Munich and Berlin.

Ilić worked as a music editor at TV Belgrade and for PGP-RTB and PGP-RTS record labels.

== Legacy ==
In 2000, Generacija 5 song "Dolazim za pet minuta" was polled No.53 on Rock Express Top 100 Yugoslav Rock Songs of All Times list. In 2011, the same song was polled, by the listeners of Radio 202, one of 60 greatest songs released by PGP-RTB/PGP-RTS during the sixty years of the label's existence.

== Awards and honors ==
- Jury's Award at the 1986 MESAM festival.
- Jury's Award at the 1987 MESAM festival.
- Josip Slavenski Award
- Vasilije Mokranjac Award
- Darko Kraljić Award

== Discography ==
=== With Generacija 5 ===
==== Studio albums ====
- Generacija 5 (1980)
- Dubler (1982)
- Svet je tvoj (1997)
- Energija (2006)

=== Live albums ===
- Unplugged & Live (2002)

==== Compilations ====
- Generacija 5 78–94 (1994)
- Pomoli se još jednom... (2000)

==== Singles ====
- "Novi život" / "Izgubljeni san" (1978)
- "Svemu dođe kraj" / "Noćni mir" (1979)
- "Umoran od svega" / "Ti samo budi dovoljno daleko" (1979)
- "Spakuj se, požuri" / "Samo laži" (1981)
- "Opasna po život" (2016)
