= Samo napred... =

Studio album by YU Grupa
- Released: 1979
- Genre: Hard rock; progressive rock
- Length: 30:53
- Label: PGP-RTB
- Producer: Aleksandar Pilipenko

YU Grupa chronology
Među zvezdama (1977)	Samo napred... (1979)	Od zlata jabuka (1987)

Samo napred... (trans. Ride On...) is the fifth studio album from Serbian and former Yugoslav rock band YU Grupa. It would be the last album recorded by YU Grupa before they disbanded in 1981, releasing their comeback album Od zlata jabuka in 1987.

Samo napred... is the band's first album recorded with the drummer Dragoljub Đuričić (who replaced Dragan Micić), the organist Dragan Janković and the guitarist Bata Kostić (who previously only appeared as a full-fledged member on the band's second album Kako To Da Svaki Dan despite his long tenure with the group. He was also featured on Među zvezdama as a guest).

== Track listing ==
No.	Title	Lyrics	Music	Length
1.	"Nešto si mi umorna i bleda" ("You Seem Tired and Pale to Me")	M. Tucaković	M. Kostić	3:49
2.	"Samo napred, guraj, guraj" ("Ride On, Keep on Pushing")	M. Tucaković	M. Kostić, D. Jelić	3:46
3.	"Plejboj" ("Playboy")	M. Tucaković	M. Kostić, Ž. Jelić	4:30
4.	"Hej, da me vidiš" ("Hey, You Should See Me")	M. Tucaković	M. Kostić, Ž. Jelić	4:28
5.	"Pera amateur" ("Pera the Amateur")	M. Tucaković	M. Kostić, D. Jelić	2:57
6.	"Autobus za raj" ("Bus to Heaven")	M. Tucaković	D. Jelić, D. Đuričić	3:49
7.	"Da si M.M. ili B.B." ("If you were M.M. or B.B.")	M. Tucaković	D. Jelić, D. Đuričić	2:54
8.	"Udaj se dobro" ("Find a Good Husband")	M. Tucaković	M. Kostić	4:40

== Personnel ==
- Dragi Jelić - guitar, vocals
- Žika Jelić - bass guitar
- Bata Kostić - guitar, vocals (on "Plejboj")
- Dragan Janković - organ
- Dragoljub Đuričić - drums

=== Guest musicians ===
- Marina Tucaković - lyrics
- Slađana Milošević - backing vocals
- Dragana Šarić - backing vocals
- Aleksandar Pilipenko - producer
- Dragan Vukićević - recorded by
