= Rim 1994 =

Studio album by YU Grupa
- Released: 1995
- Recorded: November 17 – December 27, 1994; Lead Studio, Rome
- Genre: Hard rock
- Length: 46:39
- Label: PGP-RTS
- Producer: Dragi Jelić; Mario Zannini Quirini

YU Grupa chronology
Tragovi (1990)	Rim 1994 (1995)	Dugo znamo se (2005)

Rim 1994, also known as Rim only, is the ninth studio album from Serbian and former Yugoslav rock band YU Grupa.

The album was entitled Rim 1994 (Rim being Serbian for Rome), as it was recorded in Rome at the end of 1994. Rim 1994 is the first album recorded with the guitarist Petar Jelić, who replaced Bata Kostić. There would be a 10-year gap between Rim 1994 and YU Grupa's next studio album, 2005's Dugo znamo se.

== Track listing ==
1. "Odlazim" (D. Jelić, B. Telatović) – 4:20
2. "Oluja" (D. Jelić, I. Ristić) – 4:24
3. "Dunave" (D. Jelić, Z. Stanković, V. Andrevski) – 4:18
4. "Gledaj samo pravo" (D. Jelić, Z. Stanković) – 4:25
5. "Ruža vetrova" (D. Jelić, Z. Stanković) - 4:14
6. "Duša peva" (P. Jelić, Z. Stanković, I. Ristić) – 4:58
7. "Blok" (D. Jelić, I Ristić, P. Jelić) – 3:26
8. "Hoće, neće" (D. Jelić, I Ristić) – 3:54
9. "Rock 'n' Roll" (D. Jelić, I Ristić, P. Jelić) – 4:08
10. "Reka" (D. Jelić, Z. Stanković, P. Jelić) – 4:28
11. "Buđenje" (P. Jelić) – 4:42

== Personnel ==
- Dragi Jelić - guitar, vocals
- Žika Jelić - bass guitar
- Petar Jelić - guitar
- Ratislav Đelmaš - drums

=== Guest musicians ===
- Mario Zannini Quirini - keyboards
