= Dugo znamo se =

Studio album by YU Grupa
- Released: 2005
- Recorded: Studio 5 PGP-RTS, Belgrade
- Genre: Hard rock
- Length: 45:54
- Label: PGP-RTS
- Producer: Saša Habić

YU Grupa chronology
| Rim 1994 (1995) | Dugo znamo se (2005) | Live (2007) |

Professional ratings
Review scores
| Source | Rating |
|---|---|
| Barikada | 7/10 stars |

Dugo znamo se (trans. We Have Known Each Other for a Long Time) is the tenth studio album from Serbian and former Yugoslav rock band YU Grupa. It is the band's first album since the release of the album Rim 1994 in 1995.

== Track listing ==
1. "Zamoliću te" (D. Jelić, P. Jelić) – 5:35
2. "Dugo znamo se" (D. Jelić, D. Baćino, P. Jelić) – 4:28
3. "Bože spasi me" (D. Jelić, Z. Đukić, P. Jelić) – 5:04
4. "Ima samo jedna stvar" (D. Jelić, D. Baćino, P. Jelić) – 4:47
5. "Tango" (D. Jelić, Z. Đukić, P. Jelić) - 5:28
6. "Pustinja" (D. Jelić, D. Šarić, P. Jelić) – 3:24
7. "Poklanjam" (D. Jelić, P. Jelić) – 4:55
8. "Vreme ljubav ubije" (D. Jelić, D. Baćino, P. Jelić) – 4:44
9. "Zašto ljubav navodi na strah" (D. Jelić, P. Jelić) – 3:44
10. "Poslednja pesma" (D. Jelić, D. Baćino, P. Jelić) – 3:55

== Personnel ==
- Dragi Jelić - guitar, vocals
- Žika Jelić - bass guitar
- Petar Jelić - guitar
- Igor Malešević - drums

=== Guest musicians ===
- Saša Lokner - keyboards
