= Live (YU Grupa album) =

Live album by YU Grupa
- Released: 2007
- Recorded: January 1996, Studio M, Novi Sad; December 2005, Dom Omladine, Belgrade
- Genre: Hard rock; folk rock; blues rock
- Length: 72:56
- Label: PGP-RTS
- Producer: Peđa Pajić; YU Grupa

YU Grupa chronology
Dugo znamo se (2005)	Live (2007)	The Ultimate Collection (2009)

Professional ratings
Review scores
Source	Rating
Barikada	link

Live is the first live album by Serbian and former Yugoslav rock band YU Grupa.

Although the band previously appeared on various artists live albums Kongres rock majstora (1975) and Legende YU Rocka (1988), Live is their first official live album. The first ten tracks on the album were recorded on the band's concert in Dom Omladine in Belgrade, in December 2005, while the last six tracks were recorded on the band's unplugged concert in Studio M in Novi Sad, in January 1996.

== Track listing ==
1. "Moj stari bend" – 3:30
2. "Gledaj samo pravo" – 4:33
3. "Dunavom šibaju vetrovi" – 5:03
4. "Zamoliću te" – 4:19
5. "Opasno, opasno te volim" – 4:17
6. "U tami disko kluba" – 3:40
7. "Crni leptir" – 5:15
8. "Od zlata jabuka" – 3:45
9. "Pustinja" – 3:25
10. "Mornar" – 4:38
11. "Oluja" – 6:11
12. "More" – 6:13
13. "Ruža vetrova" – 4:16
14. "Reka" – 5:04
15. "Blok" – 3:19
16. "Čudna šuma" – 5:28

== Personnel ==
=== Dom Omladine ===
- Dragi Jelić - vocals, guitar
- Žika Jelić - vocals, bass guitar
- Petar Jelić - guitar, backing vocals
- Igor Malešević - drums

==== Guest musicians ====
- Kornelije Kovač - keyboards
- Goca Svilarević - backing vocals
- Mirjana Jovanović - backing vocals

=== Unplugged ===
- Dragi Jelić - vocals, guitar
- Žika Jelić - vocals, bass guitar
- Petar Jelić - guitar, backing vocals
- Ratislav Đelmaš - drums

==== Guest musicians ====
- Kornelije Kovač - keyboards
- Ceca Slavković - backing vocals
- Goca Svilarević - backing vocals
- Nenad Januzović - percussion
- Uroš Šećerov - percussion
- Gabor Bunford - saxophone
- Vladimir Nežić - trombone
- Zoltan Hegediš - trumpet
- Dragan Kozarčić - trumpet
