= YU Grupa (1975 album) =

Studio album by YU Grupa
- Released: 1975
- Recorded: Radio Television Belgrade Studios, November 1974
- Genre: Hard rock; progressive rock
- Length: 32:54
- Label: Jugoton
- Producer: Žika Jelić

YU Grupa chronology
Kako to da svaki dan? (1974)	YU Grupa (1975)	YU zlato (1976)

YU Grupa is the third studio album from Serbian and former Yugoslav rock band YU Grupa. YU Grupa is the band's second self-titled album, the first one being their debut album released in 1973.

== Track listing ==
No.	Title	Lyrics	Music	Length
1.	"Možda ti, možda ja" ("Maybe You, Maybe Me")	M. Tucaković	D. Jelić	4:13
2.	"Oprosti, ljubavi" ("Forgive Me, My Love")	M. Tucaković	D. Jelić	3:51
3.	"Bolje se živi" ("It's a Better Living")	M. Tucaković	D. Jelić	4:41
4.	"Čovek kao ja" ("A Man like Me")	M. Tucaković	D. Jelić, R. Đelmaš	3:29
5.	"Novi zvuk" ("New Sound")	M. Tucaković	D. Jelić, R. Đelmaš	3:01
6.	"Ja moram dalje" ("I Must Go On")	M. Tucaković	D. Jelić, R. Đelmaš	2:55
7.	"Ljubav je kao cvet" ("Love Is Like a Flower")	M. Tucaković	D. Jelić, Ž. Jelić	3:48
8.	"Kad" ("When")	M. Tucaković	D. Jelić, Ž. Jelić	3:26
9.	"Kišni dan" ("Rainy Day")	M. Tucaković	D. Jelić, Ž. Jelić	3:30

== Personnel ==
- Dragi Jelić – guitar, vocals
- Žika Jelić – bass guitar, vocals
- Ratislav Đelmaš – drums
