= YU Grupa =

Serbian (former Yugoslav) rock band

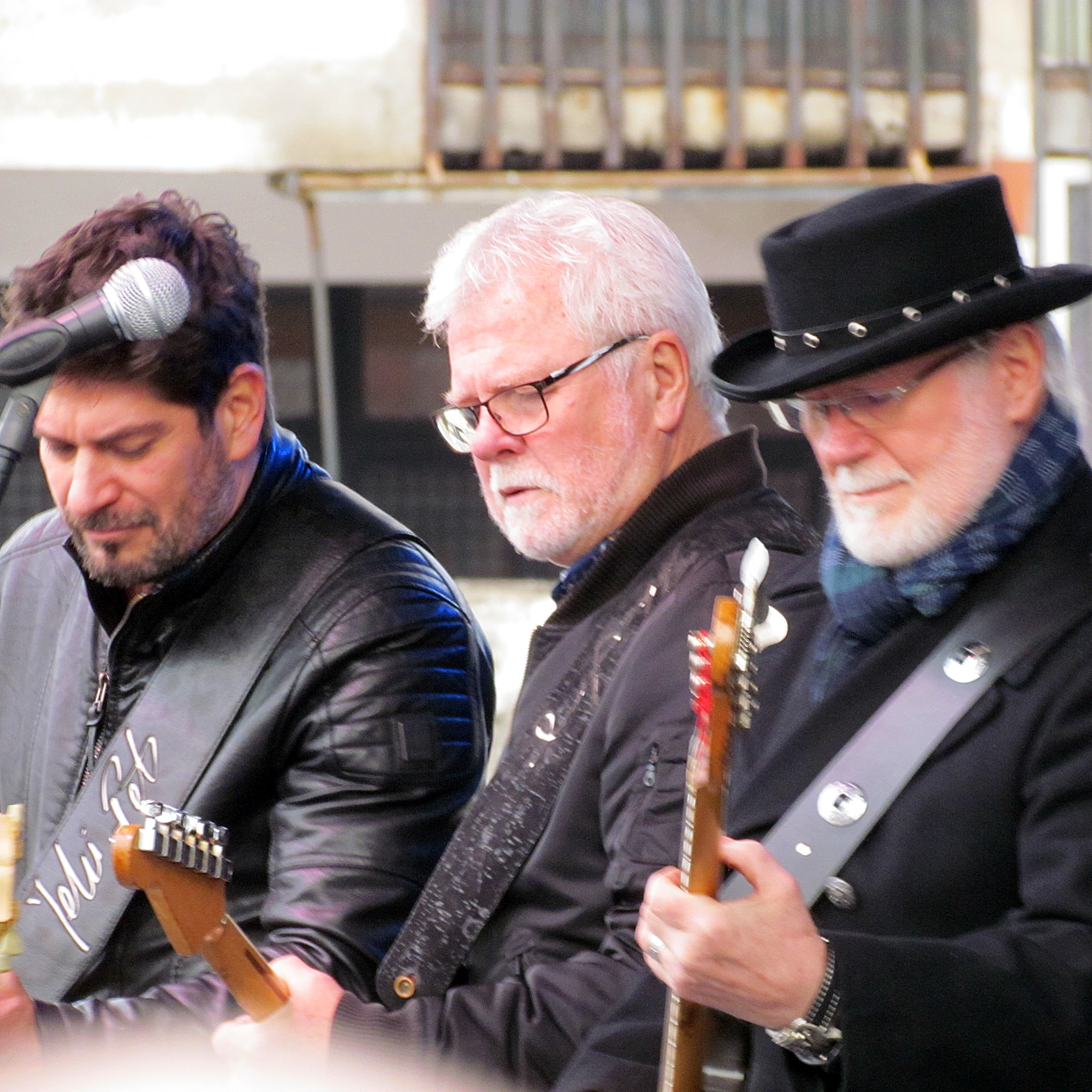
- Members of YU Grupa performing live in Belgrade in 2018, from left to right: Petar, Dragi and Žika Jelić

Background information
- Origin: Belgrade, Yugoslavia (present-day Serbia)
- Genres: Progressive rock; hard rock; blues rock; folk rock
- Years active: 1970 – 1981; 1987 – present
- Labels: PGP-RTB, Jugoton, ZKP RTLJ, PGP-RTS, Croatia Records
- Spinoffs: Opus, Zebra, Leb i Sol
- Spinoff of: Džentlmeni
- Members: Dragi Jelić; Žika Jelić; Petar Jelić; Saša Žule Radojević
- Past members: Miodrag Okrugić; Velibor Bogdanović; Miodrag Kostić; Ratislav Đelmaš; Dragan Micić; Nedžat Maculja; Dragoljub Đuričić; Dragan Janković; Igor Malešević; Slobodan Jurišić
- Website: www.yugrupa.rs

YU Grupa (trans. YU Group) is a Serbian and former Yugoslav rock band. A pioneer in combining rock music with the elements of traditional Balkan music, YU Grupa is credited with being the longest-lasting Serbian rock band.

== Band history ==
=== 1970–1981 ===
YU Grupa was formed in the autumn of 1970 by brothers Dragi (vocals, guitar) and Žika Jelić (bass guitar), both former members of the band Džentlmeni, along with Miodrag Okrugić (organ) and Velibor Bogdanović (drums). In the beginning, the band performed under the name Idejni Posed (Notional Property), which was suggested by Korni Grupa leader Kornelije Kovač. In November 1970, on their concert in Sinagoga club in Zemun, disc jockey Zoran Modli asked the audience to suggest a name for the band. The name YU Grupa was suggested by a young man called Miroslav Stanivuk. In accordance with the name, the band continued to hold birthday concerts on November 29, the date of Federal People's Republic of Yugoslavia declaration.

Their first song, "Nona", was recorded at the end of December 1970. The song was inspired by folk music of Kosovo, and by recording it YU Grupa became one of the pioneers of combining rock and folk music elements on the Yugoslav rock scene. Their first solo concert was organised by radio personality and chess master Nikola Karaklajić and journalist Peca Popović, editors of the Radio Belgrade show Veče uz radio (Evening by the Radio). The concert was held in Dadov Theatre on 21 January 1969. During the year they held a great number of concerts, mostly in Serbia. They recorded fourteen songs for the needs of Radio Belgrade, part of those songs later released on their vinyl singles. All the copies of their first single "Nona" were sold immediately after the release, but the publisher, PGP-RTB, refused to release a new number of copies, so YU Grupa signed a contract with Jugoton. The band appeared at the Belgrade Spring Festival with the song "Tajna" ("Secret"), a different version of the song performed at the same festival by Zdenka Kovačiček. The songs "Drveni most" ("Wooden Bridge"), "Mali medved" ("Little Bear") and "Devojka Džoj" ("Girl Named Joy") were well accepted on all of their concerts. Okrugić's song "Opus 1" had a significant place on their live appearances, however, it was never recorded by YU Grupa.

The band spent the summer performing at the prestigious club Lanterna in Rovinj. These concerts brought first conflicts inside the band. After they returned to Belgrade, Okrugić left (later forming the band Opus) and guitarist Miodrag "Bata" Kostić joined the band. Kostić was previously involved in the band's activity, as he was involved in writing of some of the band's songs. Dragi Jelić and Kostić were an effective guitar duo, and Kostić continued to write folk-inspired hits. In March 1970, the band went on Bulgarian tour, during which they held forty concerts. Due to the fact that Veče uz radio show had a cult status in Bulgaria, audience knew all of their songs, but one part of the public was shocked by their appearance. After they returned to Yugoslavia, they performed at the rock evening of Belgrade Spring Festival, performing at Dom Sindikata Hall with Korni Grupa, Time and Mladi Levi.

The band spent the summer of 1972 playing in Rovinj's Lanterna. The concerts in Rovinj were crucial for the band's lineup once again. After returning to Belgrade Kostić and Bogdanović left the band, Kostić joining Jutro, and later forming Opus with Okrugić. YU Grupa continued as a trio, with Ratislav "Raša" Đelmaš, a former Mobi Dik, Pop Mašina and Siluete member, as the new drummer. They spent the next year playing all across Yugoslavia, gaining new fans in Slovenia and Croatia. At that time, the keyboardist Tihomir "Pop" Asanović was approached to become a new member, but refused, deciding to join Novi Fosili instead. In February 1971, YU Grupa went to London to purchase new equipment, and the CBS Records producers, who earlier had an opportunity to hear their recordings, organized their concert in The Marquee. Thanks to the concert the band got a term at a studio, recorded demos, and a cooperation with CBS records was planned. The band returned to Yugoslavia to hold a concert at Belgrade's Hala sportova, and, holding a high position on Yugoslav rock scene, the band discarded the career in England, also refusing to become the opening band on The Allman Brothers Band tour. In the summer of 1973 their debut self-titled album was released. The album brought numerous hits: "Trka" ("The Race"), "Čudna šuma" ("Strange Forest"), blues-oriented "More" ("The Sea"), and their cult ballad "Crni leptir" ("Black Butterfly"), which was sung by Žika Jelić. In November Kostić returned to the band.

At the beginning of 1974, YU Grupa played on Srđan Marjanović's debut album Srđan Marjanović i prijatelji, and later released their second studio album Kako to da svaki dan? (How Come Every Day...?). The album was musically more diverse, but did not contain the same kind of numerous hits as the previous album. At the end of the year, Dragi Jelić went to serve the army, and until he returned YU Grupa performed as trio. In 1975, Yugoslav guitarists took part in Kongres rock majstora (Congress of Rock Masters) concert. The double album Kongres rock majstora was released, on which Žika Jelić and Đelmaš were the support band following Bata Kostić, Vedran Božić and Josip Boček.

Dragi returned in June 1975, and Kostić left the band conventionally. The band negotiated with the keyboard player Oliver Mandić, but the cooperation was not agreed. In 1975, they released YU Grupa, featuring hits "Oprosti ljubavi" ("Forgive Me, My Love"), "Novi zvuk" ("New Sound") and "Ja moram dalje" ("I Have to Move On"). In September 1976, a compilation album YU zlato (YU Gold), which featured their songs released on 7" singles, was released. During the same year, Đelmaš left the band and formed Zebra. Dragan Micić replaced Đelmaš, and at the end of 1976, guitarist Nedžat Maculja joined the band. In 1977, they went on the Soviet Union tour, during which they held sixty-four concerts. During the same year, they released their fourth studio album Među zvezdama (Among the Stars). The album featured Bata Kostić as a guest musician.

In 1978, YU Grupa performed at the pop-oriented festival in Opatija, and their song "Spali svoja sećanja" ("Burn Your Memories") was released on the festival album Opatija 78. At the end 1978, Kostić once again became the member of the band, and a former Mama Co Co and Ribeli member Dragoljub Đuričić (drums) and a former Zdravo member Dragan Janković (keyboard) joined YU Grupa. This lineup held another Soviet Union tour.

The next album Samo napred... (Ride On...), released in 1979, featured hits "Identitet ("Identity"), "Udaj se dobro" ("Get Married Well"), "Ideš mi na nerve" ("You're Getting on My Nerves"), "Autobus za raj" ("Bus to Heaven"). The album featured Bebi Dol and Slađana Milošević on backing vocals as guests. At the time of the great popularity of new wave bands in Yugoslavia, YU Grupa's popularity, alongside the popularity of other bands with similar stylistic orientation, declined. At the end of 1981, their van which included musical equipment, burned down, and Žika Jelić got injured in the fire. After this incident, YU Grupa members decided to end their activity. The Jelić brothers started working as concert organisers, Đuričić became a member of Leb i Sol, and Miodrag Kostić became a Radio Belgrade editor.

=== 1987–present ===
Although they occasionally performed during the 1980s, YU Grupa officially reunited in 1987, in the lineup that featured Jelić brothers, Bata Kostić and Velibor Bogdanović. They released their comeback album Od zlata jabuka (Golden Apple), with the title track inspired by folk music as the main hit. YU Grupa performed at the Legende YU rocka (Legends of Yugoslav Rock) concert, alongside Indexi, Drago Mlinarec, Korni Grupa, Time and Radomir Mihajlović Točak. Live versions of YU Grupa's "Čudna šuma", "U tami disko kluba" ("In the Darkness of Discothèque"), "Crni leptir" and a medley compiled of "Nona", "Kosovski božuri" ("Kosovo Peonies") and "Sama" ("Alone") were released on the double live album Legende YU Rocka.

In November 1988, YU Grupa released Ima nade (There Is Hope). The album's biggest hits were "Mornar" ("Sailor") and the power ballad "Dunavom šibaju vetrovi" ("Winds Blow by the Danube"). This album was followed by Tragovi (Traces), recorded with Đelmaš on the drums once again, and featuring Pera Joe, Saša Lokner and Nikola Čuturilo as guests.

At the band's 22nd birthday, old members of the band played with YU Grupa, and the band got a new member, guitarist Petar Jelić (Dragi and Žika's nephew). The new lineup released album Rim 1994 (Rome 1994). The album was recorded in Italy, and was produced by Dragi Jelić and Mario Zaninni Quirini. The album brought hits "Odlazim" ("I'm Leaving"), "Oluja" ("Storm"), "Dunav" ("Danube"), "Gledaj samo pravo" ("Just Look Straight Ahead"). During the late 1990s, the band rarely performed in Yugoslavia.

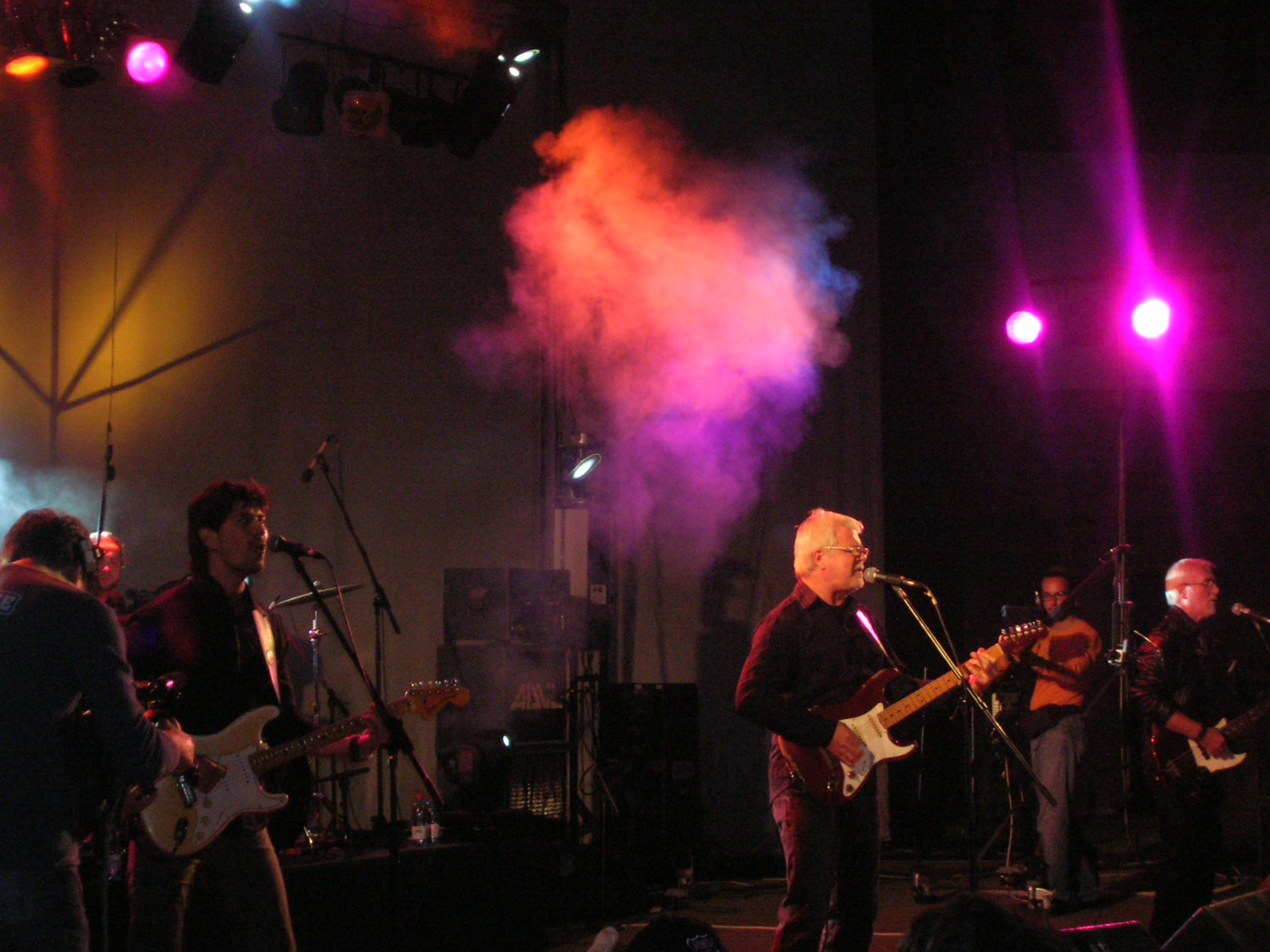
YU Grupa performing live in Niš in 2007

In 2005, with Igor Malešević (a former Hazari and Bjesovi member) as the new drummer, YU Grupa released a studio album with a symbolic title Dugo znamo se (We've Known Each Other for a Long Time). The album was mostly hard rock-oriented. The lyrics for the song "Pustinja" ("Desert") were written by Bebi Dol, and the lyrics for "Bože, spasi me" ("God, Save Me") and "Tango" were written by Van Gogh frontman Zvonimir Đukić. The album featured Saša Lokner on keyboards, as guest musician. The album was well received, and brought hits "Pustinja", "Zamoliću te" ("I'm Asking You"), "Bože, spasi me", and "Tango". In 2007, the band released its first official live album Live. Some of the tracks featured on the album were recorded in 1996 on YU Grupa unplugged concert in Studio M in Novi Sad, which featured Kornelije Kovač on piano.

In 2008, drummer Slobodan Jurišić replaced Malešević. In 2009, Croatia Records released the double compilation album, The Ultimate Collection, which featured 35 songs from 1972–77.

On 9 April 2013, at the band's concert in Foča, Žika Jelić suffered an electric shock, after which he was transported to a hospital. The concert was ended with Petar Jelić playing the bass guitar. At a following concert, a local musician played bass.

With Malešević on drums once again, the band celebrated 45 years of activity with a concert in New Belgrade Sports Hall, held on 17 December 2015. The concert featured numerous guests: Partibrejkers frontman Zoran Kostić "Cane", Smak guitarist Radomir Mihajlović "Točak" and bass guitarist Zoran Milanović, Disciplina Kičme frontman Dušan Kojić "Koja" and singer-songwriter Nikola Čuturilo.

In February 2016, on Serbian Statehood Day, Dragi and Žika Jelić were awarded the second class Sretenje Medal by the President of Serbia Tomislav Nikolić for their contribution to Serbian culture.

In April 2016, the band released their twelfth studio album, entitled Evo stojim tu (I Am Standing Here). The album, announced with the singles "Panika" ("Panic"), released in November 2015, and "Ko" ("Who"), released in March 2016, was released through PGP-RTS and featured lyrics written by Petar Jelić, Bora Đorđević and Nikola Čuturilo. The album was also released on vinyl in 2020.

The band's former member Raša Đelmaš died in Belgrade on 28 October 2021 at the age of 72.

== Legacy ==
In 2016 Dragi and Žika Jelić were awarded the second class Sretenje Order by the President of Serbia, Tomislav Nikolić, for their contribution to Serbian culture.

The song "Čudna šuma" was covered by the alternative rock band Disciplina Kičme on their 1986 album Svi za mnom!, by the punk rock band Generacija Bez Budućnosti on their 1997 album Spleen, and by the rock band Prljavi Inspektor Blaža i Kljunovi on their 2007 live album Samo Supermen Srbiju Spašava. The song "Noć je moja" was covered by the progressive rock band Frenky on their 1993 album Noć je moja. The song "U tami disko kluba" was covered by pop singer Aleksa Jelić (Dragi Jelić's son) on his 2008 album U tami disko kluba.

The book YU 100: najbolji albumi jugoslovenske rok i pop muzike (YU 100: The Best albums of Yugoslav pop and rock music) features two YU Grupa albums: YU zlato (ranked No. 57) and YU Grupa (ranked No. 62).

The Rock Express Top 100 Yugoslav Rock Songs of All Times list featured four songs by YU Grupa: "Crni leptir" (polled No.18), "Kosovski božuri" (polled No.33), "Čudna šuma" (polled No.50) and "Osveta" (polled No.60). The B92 Top 100 Domestic Songs list features two songs by YU Grupa: "Čudna šuma" (ranked No. 29) and "Crni leptir" (ranked No. 47). In 2011, the song "Mornar" was polled, by the listeners of Radio 202, one of 60 greatest songs released by PGP-RTB/PGP-RTS during the sixty years of the label's existence.

== Discography ==
- YU Grupa (1973)
- Kako to da svaki dan? (1974)
- YU Grupa (1975)
- Među zvezdama (1977)
- Samo napred... (1979)
- Od zlata jabuka (1987)
- Ima nade (1988)
- Tragovi (1990)
- Rim 1994 (1994)
- Dugo znamo se (2005)
- Evo stojim tu (2016)
- Bus to Zion (2026)
