= Zebra (Yugoslav band) =

Yugoslavian rock band (1976–1979)

Background information
- Origin: Belgrade, Serbia, Yugoslavia
- Genres: Rock; hard rock
- Years active: 1976–1979
- Labels: ZKP RTLJ, PGP-RTB
- Past members: Raša Đelmaš; Anka Lazarević; Ana Merlini; Bata Radovanović; Dušan Lazarević; Miroslav Stamenković; Karolj Burai; Nenad Stamatović; Željko Nikolić; Zoran Bartulović

Zebra (Serbian Cyrillic: Зебра) was a Yugoslav rock band formed in Belgrade in 1976. Formed and led by drummer Ratislav "Raša" Đelmaš, Zebra was a prominent act of the 1970s Yugoslav rock scene.

== Band history ==
=== 1976–1979 ===
During the 1960s and at the beginning of the 1970s, drummer Ratislav "Raša" Đelmaš performed in the bands Anđeli (The Angels), Hendriksova Deca (Hendrix's Children), Mobi Dik (Moby Dick) and Felix. In 1972, he became a member of Pop Mašina, during the summer of the same year he performed with Siluete, and in the autumn of 1972 he became a member of YU Grupa. He spent four years with YU Grupa and recorded three albums with them. After leaving YU Grupa in 1976, Đelmaš formed Zebra.

The first lineup of Zebra featured, besides Đelmaš, Bata Radovanović (keyboards), Dušan Lazarević (bass guitar), Miroslav Stamenković (trumpet), Karolj Burai (saxophone) and two female members, Anka Lazarević (vocals) and Ana Merlini (guitar). During the following years, a large number of musicians passed through the band, including guitarists Nenad "Nele" Stamatović (later a member of the bands Bulevar and Bajaga i Instruktori and a solo artist) and Željko Nikolić (later the leader of the band Roze Poze).

Zebra's debut release, the EP Igra (The Game), was released through ZKP RTLJ in 1977. It was produced by Ivo Umek. All the songs were composed by Đelmaš, and the lyrics were written by singer and songwriter Dušan Prelević. During the same year, the band performed at the sixth edition of BOOM Festival, and their songs "Telefon" ("Telephone") and "Moja mala zebra" ("My Little Zebra") appeared on the various artists live album BOOM '77 recorded on the festival. During 1978, the band released two 7-inch singles.

In 1979, the band released their only studio album, Kažu da takav je red (They Say That's the Way It Should Be). The band recorded the album in the lineup that featured Raša Đelmaš (drums), Anka Lazarević (vocals), Bata Radovanović (keyboards), Željko Nikolić (guitar) and Zoran Bartulović (bass guitar). All the songs were composed by Đelmaš, and the lyrics were written by Lazarević, except the lyrics for "Šarena laža" ("Hoax"), written by poet Duško Trifunović. Besides playing drums, on the album recording Đelmaš also sang and played percussion and synthesizer. The album was produced by Nikola Borota Radovan, and the science fiction-themed cover and the comic on the inner sleeve were designed by Vladeta Andrić. The album was poorly received by the critics, largely due to Lazarević's naive lyrics. Soon after the album release, the group disbanded.

=== Post breakup ===
After Zebra ended their activity, Đelmaš released hard rock-oriented solo album Hot rock, in 1982. The album featured Đelmaš on vocals and drums, Zoran Nastoski of the band Magično Oko on vocals, Laza Ristovski on keyboards, Đelmaš's former bandmate from YU Grupa Bata Kostić on guitar, and Lola Andrijić on bass guitar. The lyrics were written by Lazarević, who also sang backing vocals on the recording. In 1989, Đelmaš returned to YU Grupa, recording two more albums with them. After leaving YU Grupa for the second time, he retired from music, dedicating himself to car racing. He died in Belgrade on 28 October 2021.

== Discography ==
=== Studio albums ===
- Kažu da takav je red (1979)

=== EPs ===
- Igra (1977)

=== Singles ===
- "Moja mala zebra" / "Šumadinka plava" (1978)
- "Ma ko si ti" / "Motor" (1978)

=== Other appearances ===
- "Telefon" / "Moja mala zebra" (BOOM '77, 1977)
