= YU Grupa (1973 album) =

Studio album by YU Grupa
- Released: 1973
- Genre: Hard rock; progressive rock; blues rock
- Length: 35:13
- Label: Jugoton

YU Grupa chronology
YU Grupa (1973)	Kako to da svaki dan? (1974)

1996 reissue cover

YU Grupa is the debut studio album from Serbian and former Yugoslav rock band YU Grupa, released in 1973.

The album was polled in 1998 as the 62nd on the list of 100 greatest Yugoslav rock and pop albums in the book YU 100: najbolji albumi jugoslovenske rok i pop muzike (YU 100: The Best albums of Yugoslav pop and rock music).

== Track listing ==
No.	Title	Lyrics	Music	Length
1.	"Trka" ("The Race")	D. Nedimović	D. Jelić	4:34
2.	"Noć je moja" ("Night Is Mine")	B. Marušić	D. Jelić	5:42
3.	"Čovek i Marsovac" ("A Man and a Martian")	D. Nedimović	D. Jelić	3:31
4.	"Čudna šuma" ("Strange Forest")	D. Nedimović	D. Jelić	3:42
5.	"Trenutak sna" ("A Moment of Dream")	D. Nedimović	D. Jelić	4:21
6.	"Devojko mala, podigni glavu" ("Little Girl, Raise Your Head")	D. Nedimović	D. Jelić	3:53
7.	"Crni leptir" ("Black Butterfly")	D. Jelić	D. Jelić	3:51
8.	"More" ("The Sea")	D. Nedimović	D. Jelić	5:39

== Personnel ==
- Dragi Jelić – guitar, vocals
- Žika Jelić – bass guitar, vocals (on "Crni leptir")
- Ratislav Đelmaš – drums

== Reception ==
The songs "Crni leptir", "More", "Trka", "Čudna šuma" and "Noć je moja" became hits. The cult ballad "Crni letptir" was also remembered for being one of the three YU Grupa songs sung by the bass guitarist Žika Jelić (the other ones being the ballad "Dunavom šibaju vetrovi" from the band's 1988 album Ima nade and "Žao mi je što nisam tvoj" from the 2016 album Evo stojim tu).

The album sold more than 30,000 copies, and until the release of Bijelo Dugme's self-titled debut album in 1974 was the best-selling Yugoslav rock album.

== Reissues ==
The record label Hi-Fi Centar reissued the album on CD and with an alternate cover in 1996.

== Legacy ==
The album was polled in 1998 as the 62nd on the list of 100 greatest Yugoslav rock and pop albums in the book YU 100: najbolji albumi jugoslovenske rok i pop muzike (YU 100: The Best albums of Yugoslav pop and rock music).

In 2006, the song "Čudna šuma" was ranked #29 and the song "Crni leptir" was ranked #47 on the B92 Top 100 Domestic Songs List.

Boris Mladenović, member of the alternative rock band Jarboli and the britpop/alternative rock band Veliki Prezir, stated, talking about YU Grupa's debut album, that "bravery of the band is that big that both virtuous and naive parts of the album are equally admirable. [...] If Eastern European rock really existed as a genre, YU Grupa's first album would be its most important representative."

== Covers ==
Serbian alternative rock band Disciplina Kičme released a cover of "Čudna šuma" on their 1986 album Svi za mnom!.

== Sampling ==
In 1998, the punk rock band from Novi Sad Generacija Bez Budućnosti sampled the song "Čudna šuma" in their song of same name.
