= Grupa I =

Former rock band

- The 1979–1981 Grupa I lineup, from left to right: Dejan Kostić, Predrag Mijović, Branko Kuštrin and Branko Kojić.

Background information
- Origin: Belgrade, SR Serbia, SFR Yugoslavia
- Genres: Hard rock; power pop; ska; reggae; new wave
- Years active: 1979–1982
- Labels: PGP-RTB
- Past members: Dejan Kostić; Branko Bogićević; Branko Kojić; Branko Kuštrin; Predrag Mijović

Grupa I (Serbian Cyrillic: Група И; trans. Group I) was a Serbian and Yugoslav rock band formed in Belgrade in 1979. Although short-lived. the group was a prominent act of the late 1970s and early 1980s Yugoslav rock scene.

The band was formed in 1979 by Dejan Kostić (guitar), Predrag Mijović (guitar), Branko Kojić (bass guitar), Branko Kuštrin (drums) and Branko Bogićević (vocals). After the release of the band's debut 7-inch single during the same year, Bogićević left the band, Kojić taking over the vocal duties. The band's debut album, Na svom talasu (1980), presented a combination of diverse musical influences, primarily hard rock, but also power pop, ska and reggae. After the album release, Mijović left the band, Grupa I continuing as a trio. With their second album, I zvuci za I ljude (1981), the band joined in on the Yugoslav new wave scene. After the release of the EP Nove vrednosti in 1982, the group ended their activity, Kostić continuing his career as the leader of the band Du Du A.

== History ==
=== 1979–1982 ===
The band was formed in January 1979 by guitarists Dejan Kostić and Predrag Mijović, bassist Branko Kojić (former Zdravo member), drummer Branko "Mango" Kuštrin (former Tarkus member), and vocalist Branko Bogićević. The lineup recorded their debut 7-inch single "Sestra Vera" ("Nurse Vera"), with "Miris ulice" ("The Smell of the Street") as the single B-side, released by PGP-RTB in 1979. The single saw large success with the Yugoslav audience. However, soon after the single release, Bogićević left the band, and bassist Kojić took over the vocal duties.

The debut album Na svom talasu (Riding Our Own Wave), released by PGP-RTB in 1980, presented a combination of diverse musical influences – hard rock, power pop, ska and reggae. The album was produced by Slobodan Marković, who also played keyboards on some of the songs. The tracks "Tinejdž bluz" ("Teenage Blues"), "G.S.B-S.O.S.", "Mirela" and "Jugo rok" ("Yugo Rock"), the latter featuring quotations from lyrics of songs by Srebrna Krila, Srđan Marjanović and Seid Memić "Vajta" and a sample of chorus of the Vatreni Poljubac song "Doktor za rokenrol" ("PhD for Rock & Roll"), saw most radioplay. After the album release, guitarist Predrag Mijović left the band. He would work with the band on their second studio album, but not as an official member.

In 1981, the band, consisting of Kostić, Kuštrin and Kojić only, released the single "Sa tobom, bez tebe" ("With You, Without You"), with "Bekstvo" ("Escape") as the B-side. The B-side appeared on the following studio album, I zvuci za I ljude (I Sounds for I People), which marked the band's shift towards new wave, with more experimental sound than on the band's debut. The album featured prominent tracks "Bekstvo" ("Escape"), "Nove vrednosti" ("New Values") and "Složena procedura opstanka" ("A Complex Survival Procedure"), mainly ska oriented. Guest appearances featured Vuk Vujačić on saxophone and Disciplina Kičme frontman Dušan Kojić "Koja" on backing vocals.

In 1981, simultaneously with his work with Grupa I, Kostić formed the band Du Du A. In 1982, Grupa I released the four-track EP Nove vrednosti through PGP-RTB, featuring a dub version of "Nove vrednosti" produced by Dušan Kojić. Soon after the EP release, the group ended their activity.

=== Post-breakup ===
Kostić continued his career as the leader of the influential alternative rock band Du Du A, with which he worked throughout the 1980s and the 1990s. He had also made a guest appearance on the Bebi Dol album Ruže i krv, playing guitar and bass, and wrote the music for Jovan Jovanović's film Pejzaži u magli (Fogscapes).

After working with his former band on their second studio album, Mijović retired from music, moving to Botswana.

Kuštrin made a guest appearance on the Du Du A debut single "Ja Tarzan ti Džejn" ("I Tarzan, You Jane"), released in 1982. During the same year, in February, he became the drummer of Katarina II, and remained the band member until the following year. He had also performed with Doktor Spira i Ljudska Bića and Električni Orgazam, appearing on their debut self-titled album and the tour following the release of the 1983 cover album Les Chansones Populaires. He committed suicide in 1985.

== Legacy ==
Serbian alternative rock band Sinestezija released a cover of Grupa I song "Promene" ("Changes") on their 2016 album Snovi o slobodi (Dreams of Freedom).

== Discography ==
=== Studio albums ===
- Na svom talasu (1980)
- I zvuci za I ljude (1981)

=== Extended plays ===
- Nove vrednosti (1982)

=== Singles ===
- "Sestra Vera" / "Miris ulice" (1979)
- "Sa tobom, bez tebe" / "Bekstvo"(1981)

== See also ==
- New wave music in Yugoslavia
