= Zdravo =

Yugoslav disco group

Background information
- Origin: Belgrade, SR Serbia, SFR Yugoslavia
- Genres: Disco; funk; pop rock
- Years active: 1976–1978
- Labels: PGP-RTB, Suzy, Beograd Disk
- Past members: Boban Petrović; Dragan Jovanović; Branko Kojić; Vlastimir Cvetković; Boža Jeremić; Vladislav Kukolj; Branko Popović; Branko Pešić

Zdravo (Serbian Cyrillic: Здраво; trans. Hello) was a Yugoslav disco and funk group formed in Belgrade in 1976. Formed and led by vocalist and keyboardist Boban Petrović, Zdravo were a prominent act of the 1970s Yugoslav popular music scene. After the group disbanded, Petrović started a solo career that turned out to be short-lived.

== Band history ==
=== 1976–1980 ===
The group was formed in 1976 by Boban Petrović who had previously been active as a nightclub disk jockey. Having gathered several handsome teenagers and several promising musicians from Belgrade, Petrović intended to form a band which would perform communicative disco and funk music. In order to attract media attention, Petrović chose the name Zdravo after the youth magazine Zdravo, which Politika Newspapers and Magazines started publishing at about the same time. The first lineup consisted of Boban Petrović (vocals, keyboards), Dragan Jovanović (guitar, later a member of the hard rock band Generacija 5), Branko Kojić (bass guitar, later a member of the new wave band Grupa I), Vlastimir Cvetković (drums), and vocalists and dancers Boža Jeremić, Vladislav Kukolj, and Branko Popović. The band also performed with several female dancers, African girls from Zaire.

The band's only major hit was their debut single, "Vikend fobija" ("Weekend Phobia"), released in 1977. Although the song became a hit, it was generally disliked by the critics. Soon after, Jovanović left the band to form Generacija 5, so Popović invited at the time little-known guitarist Momčilo Bajagić to join the band. However, Bajagić refused the invitation, and the new member of the band became a former Innamorata member Branko Pešić "Amerikanac". In 1977, a live version of their song "Sugestivni rok" ("Suggestive Rock"), recorded on their performance in Pinki Hall, appeared on the various artists live album Pop parada I (Pop Parade I). In August 1977, Zdravo performed as one of the opening bands on Bijelo Dugme concert at Hajdučka česma, and at the end of the same year, they performed as an opening band on Indexi's Yugoslav tour. As Petrović was at the time dating singer Slađana Milošević, the band played on her debut single "Au au", and on several occasions Milošević made guest appearances on the group's concerts.

In 1978, the original Zdravo lineup disbanded, and Petrović continued to perform under the name Zdravo with various musicians, simultaneously performing with the band Orion. After releasing the 7-inch single with the songs "Sugestivni rok" and "Žalba" ("Complaint"), Popović disbanded the group, and released the following two singles under the Boban Petrović & Zdravo moniker. The latter, released in 1979, was a duet with vocalist Gordana Ivandić.

=== Post-breakup ===
Following Zdravo's demise, Petrović ventured out as a solo act by releasing an EP, Meteorologija, in 1981. The same year also saw ZKP RTLJ release his debut solo album, Žur (Party), recorded in New York City with studio musicians. Although some of its tracks—"Prepad" ("The Raid"), "Đuskaj" ("Dance") and "Kupatilo je shvatilo" ("The Bathroom Realised")—became minor hits, the record did not manage the level of success Petrović had envisioned for it.

His follow-up album, 1984's Zora (Dawn) saw an even poorer reception by the audience and media, leading to Petrović's retirement from music. Simultaneous to his short solo run, Petrović worked as the manager of the Klub M and Zvezda (Star) discothèques in Belgrade, an activity he continued even after ending his solo music career. In 1986, his novel Rokanje (Rocking), inspired by and focused on the 1980s Belgrade nightlife, was published.

In the late 1980s, Petrović moved abroad, starting a business career. For a time, he was the owner of the Spanish football club CA Marbella and the Marbella nightclub Piernas Largas (Long Legs).

Throughout the early-to-mid 2000s, as a result of his old songs being frequently played on Belgrade's Radio B92, Petrović's 1980s solo output gained some retro attention in Serbia, and, in 2006, his song "Prepad" made the B92 Top 100 Domestic Songs in 82nd spot. In 2008, Macom Records published a new edition of Rokanje and reissued Žur with bonus materials consisting of several tracks, videos and a newsreel about Petrović made by a Spanish TV station. Petrović returned to music in the 2010s, producing and writing part of the songs for the album Potraga za magičnim violončelom (The Quest for the Magic Cello) recorded by Jela Cello & Power Symphony Orchestra.

In 2020, written as a sequel to his 1986 ode to Belgrade nightlife, Petrović's autobiography titled Rokanje 2 was published. Its release was accompanied by a CD with Petrović's songs.

== Discography ==
=== Singles ===
- "Vikend fobija" / "Roditeljski savet" (1977)
- "Disko je prava stvar" / "Raspust i kraj" (1977)
- "Sugestivni rok" / "Žalba" (1978)
- "Kuc-Guc-Štuc" / "'Ajmo na žurku" (1979)
- "Moram" / "Balada o šampionu" (1980)
