= Slađana Milošević =

Serbian singer (1955–2024)

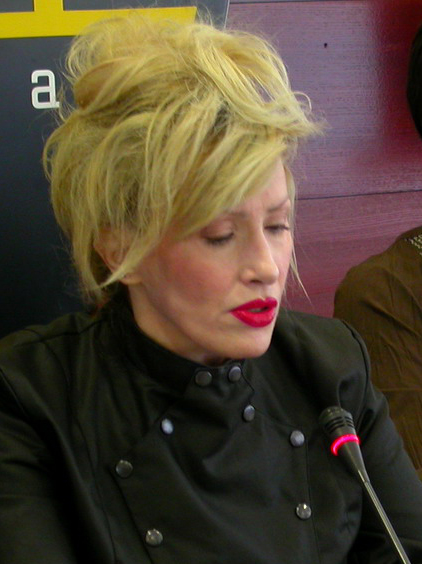
- Milošević in 2005

Background information
- Also known as: Aleksandra Milošević Hagadone
- Born: Aleksandra Milošević; 3 October 1955; Belgrade, PR Serbia, Yugoslavia
- Origin: Belgrade, Serbia
- Died: 26 March 2024 (aged 68) Belgrade, Serbia
- Genres: Rock; new wave; pop rock; synth-pop; jazz; classical music; experimental music; hard rock; heavy metal
- Occupations: Singer; songwriter; producer; author
- Instruments: Vocals; guitar; piano; keyboards; violin
- Years active: 1971–2024
- Labels: PGP-RTB; Jugoton; PGP-RTS; Wastelands Unlimited
- Formerly of: Džentlmeni
- Website: www.sladjana.com

Aleksandra Milošević Hagadone (Serbian Cyrillic: Александра Милошевић Хагадон; 3 October 1955 – 26 March 2024), better known as Slađana Milošević (Serbian Cyrillic: Слађана Милошевић, pronounced [slǎdʑana milǒːʃeʋitɕ]), was a Serbian and Yugoslav singer, songwriter, record producer, and author. Often referred to by the nickname "Rock Princess", Milošević was one of the most prominent female artists of the Yugoslav rock scene.

Milošević began learning classical music at the age of five, playing piano and later switching to violin. As a teenager, she played bass guitar in several bands, including one of the last lineups of the popular band Džentlmeni. After performing and recording with the Radio Television Belgrade Orchestra and Saša Subota's Orchestra during early and mid-1970s and performing with the disco group Zdravo, Milošević started her solo career in 1977 with the single "Au-au". Her following singles and her erotic image brought her large media attention. She released her debut album Gorim od želje da ubijem noć in 1980, joining in on the Yugoslav new wave scene and gaining nationwide popularity. In 1983, she formed the band Neutral Design with a group of West German musicians, recording the album Neutral Design to good reception in Yugoslavia and other European countries. During early and mid-1980s she was one of the most popular female vocalists and one of the biggest sex symbols of the Yugoslav rock scene. At the end of the decade, she turned towards jazz and experimental music, moving to the United States in 1989. She returned to Serbia in 1995, releasing her comeback metal-oriented album Animal Tested in 2000. In the late 2000s, she began performing only occasionally, dedicating herself to work in other fields of culture.

== Career ==
=== Early career (late 1960s–1977) ===
Slađana Milošević was born in Belgrade on 3 October 1955. Her talent for music became very apparent at the early age, so she started her education in classical music at the age of five, playing piano. Few years later, her interest turned to studying violin. At the age of twelve, she became singer and bass guitarist in a rock and roll school band, though she had not given up on the violin. As a teenager she played bass guitar in the bands Nebeska Konjica (Sky Cavalry), Epitaf 8 (Epitaph 8), Juniori (The Juniors), Slomljena Srca (The Broken Hearts) and, for a period of time, she played in one of the last lineups of the band Džentlmeni. She made her debut recording at the age of fifteen, playing violin on the 7-inch single "Za usnule oči" / "Gubim te" ("For the Sleeping Eyes" / "I'm Losing You") recorded by the Indian music-inspired band Ganesha from Belgrade.

Simultaneously with playing bass guitar, Milošević acted in plays by experimental theatre Ex Art Theatre. She continued her career in theatre appearing in the play Tom Payne by Atelje 212 theatre, in which she acted and played violin. As a violinist, she continued her musical career as a member of Radio Television Belgrade Orchestra, participating in recording of about 30 albums of different genres.

Milošević debuted as a singer at the 1974 Student Summer festival in Maglaj, winning first place. In 1976, she toured the Soviet Union as a member of Saša Subota's Orchestra. With Saša Subota's Orchestra Milošević recorded a compilation of world hits for the Soviet market and the single "Mikado" for Soviet label Melodiya. The B-side of the single featured a cover of Korni Grupa song "Ivo Lola", for which Milošević provided the vocals. Besides extensive touring with hundreds of concerts performed throughout former Soviet Union, she took part in several TV shows. One of the highlights was her interpretation of Marina Tsvetaeva's poem "I Like When You Are Yearning for Me", sung in Russian on Moscow TV, in a special birthday greeting for General Secretary of the Communist Party of the Soviet Union Leonid Brezhnev. After recording the single "Baloni" ("Balloons") with Saša Subota's Orchestra, she started performing with the disco band Zdravo, led by Boban Petrović, her boyfriend at the time.

=== Success as a solo artist, retirement from public (1977–1981) ===
Milošević started her solo career in the summer of 1977, with the single "Au-au". As major record labels in Yugoslavia were not interested in releasing the single, she financed the release of the single through PGP-RTB herself. She had her first major live appearance as an opening act on Bijelo Dugme's concert at their famous Hajdučka česma concert in Belgrade on 28 August 1977 with Zdravo as her backing band. Following "Au-au", she released the singles "Simpatija" ("Crush") and "Sexy dama" ("Sexy Lady"), both in 1978, brandishing her erotic image to large attention of the Yugoslav media and mixed reactions by the Yugoslav public. In 1978, she was invited by the jazz rock band Leb i Sol to record vocals for the song "Talasna dužina" ("Wavelength"), released on their album Leb i Sol 2.

In 1980, Slađana Milošević released her debut album Gorim od želje da ubijem noć (I'm Burning with Desire to Kill the Night). She composed part of the songs, while the rest of the songs were composed by Aleksandar "Sanja" Ilić, Enco Lesić, Miki Petkovski (formerly of the band Smak) and Aleksandar Milovanović (formerly of DAG). All the album lyrics were written by lyricist Marina Tucaković, with the exception of the lyrics for "Amsterdam", written by Mirko Glišić, the song becoming the album's biggest hit. The album was produced by Miki Petkovski and Laza Ristovski, both of them playing keyboards on the album. The rest of the musicians who took part on the album recording were Generacija 5 members Dragan Jovanović (guitar) and Miloš Stojisavljević "Cajger" (bass guitar) and former Bijelo Dugme member Ipe Ivandić (drums). The album brought nationwide popularity to Milošević, as well as attention in neighboring countries. On the 1979 New Year's Eve, Hungarian national television broadcast Milošević's one-hour performance. During 1979, Milošević made a number of guest appearances: she appeared as a backing vocalist on YU Grupa album Samo napred... and Dado Topić's album Neosedlani (The Unsaddled), and recorded the song "Imam sve" ("I've Got Everything") for the National Class Category Up to 785 ccm soundtrack, composed by Zoran Simjanović.

Milošević appeared on the 1981 Jugovizija festival, the Yugoslav national final to select their entry for the Eurovision Song Contest, with the song "Recept za ljubav" ("Recipe for Love"), written by Nenad Pavlović. The song was released on a 7-inch single with the song "Srećan ti rođendan", written by Idoli member Vlada Divljan, as the B-side. After release of the single, she started her studies of veterinary medicine and retired from performing.

=== Comeback and nationwide popularity (1983–1987) ===
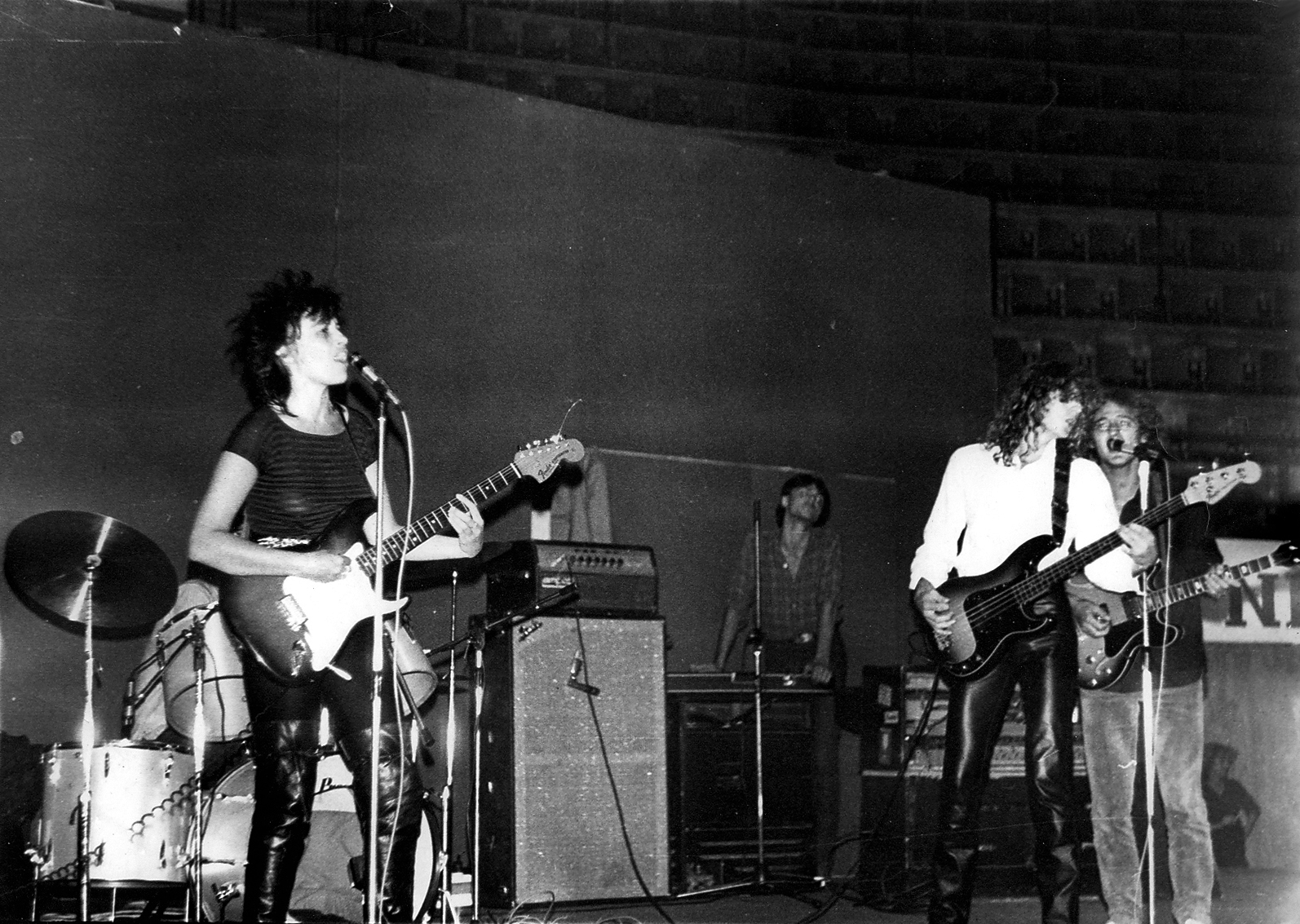
Slađana Milošević performing with her backing band in Čair Hall in Niš in the mid-1980s

In 1983, Milošević moved to Munich, Germany, where she formed the band Neutral Design with a group of German musicians, some of them previously performing with Santana and Nina Hagen. With them, she recorded the album Neutral Design, released in 1983 under Slađana & Neutral Design moniker. Milošević composed part of the songs and wrote part of the lyrics, while a part of the songs was composed by guitarist Bruce Werber and Peter Labontie, and a part of the lyrics were written by Papatra member Danko Đurić and Riblja Čorba guitarist Momčilo Bajagić "Bajaga". The album was released in Yugoslavia, as well as in other countries of Europe, achieving success in West Germany and Sweden. The album's biggest hit in Yugoslavia was the song "Miki, Miki". Neutral Design was Milošević's first album produced by herself.

After the release of Neutral Design, she returned to Yugoslavia and embarked on a tour with her new backing band Ljudi (People) as an opening act for the English rockabilly band Matchbox. At the 1984 Opatija Festival, Milošević won Special Award for Interpretation for the composition "Samsara", written by Dejan Tričković (formerly of the group Susret). During 1984, she played guitar and sung backing vocals in the band Mama Co Co, which at the time featured vocalist Dado Topić. During the same year, Milošević and Topić recorded the duet "Princeza" ("Princess"), with which they appeared at 1984 Jugovizija. Despite not winning the festival, the song became a nationwide hit. Later during the year, Milošević shot the TV show Djevojčica u svijetu čipova (Little Girl in the World of Microchips), directed by Ademir Kenović, for Television Sarajevo. The show won the Best Yugoslav TV Show of the Year Award on national television festival in Struga and was screened at the Rose d'Or festival in Montreux.

In 1985, Milošević took part in YU Rock Misija, a Yugoslav contribution to Live Aid. She took part in the recording of the charity single "Za milion godina" and in the corresponding charity concert held at the Red Star Stadium in Belgrade on 15 June. She participated in the U.S.E. project (United States of Europe, produced by Midge Ure), recorded in Paris, where she took a role of a vocal producer assistant. In 1986, she was among the organizers of the charity concert for Yugoslavs suffering from muscular dystrophy. The concert, entitled Ujedinjene snage YU rocka (United Forced of YU Rock), was held on the Belgrade's Tašmajdan Stadium. For her support, the Belgrade Paraplegic Organization proclaimed her an honorary member. In 1985, she appeared at the MESAM festival with the song "Fantastično putovanje" ("Fantastic Journey"), written by Srđan Jul, and in 1987, she won first place at the MESAM festival with the song "Bez nade" ("Without Hope"). Soon after, Italian TV channel RAI2 filmed her 20-minute show.

=== Jazz and experimental music, moving to United States (1988–1995) ===
In 1988, Milošević recorded a jazz album with songs composed by prominent jazz composer Darko Kraljić. The album, entitled Alexandra Slađana Milošević & Darko Kraljić, featured Radio Television Belgrade Jazz Orchestra, Milutin Lilić Vocal Quartet, Vladimir Vitas on piano, Vojin Draškoci on double bass, Lala Kovačev on drums, Mirjana Filipović on harp and Nikola Mitrović on trumpet. Most of the lyrics were written by Milošević, and she also played violin on the recording.

After the album recording, she represented Yugoslavia on the International Friendly Cities Singers Meeting festival in Beijing, China. She had won a Special Honorary Award and a Silver Cup for an overall two-part competition that included interpretation of a traditional Chinese song and her original music. During her staying in China, she performed in several concert venues and television shows. Following the success at the festival, the Chinese record label Hundred Flowers Records released the compilation of her own songs. Upon returning to Europe, she co-hosted a TV periodical titled Cultural Bridge Beijing-Belgrade, produced by TV Belgrade. In 1989, she went on a tour across China and performed at the Ilija M. Kolarac Endowment in the piece Tokata (Toccata) written by Igor Gostuški (formerly of the band Duh Nibor). The piece won two first prizes, at the experimental classical music contests in Opatija and Munich. During the same year, she performed the experimental piece Night Brother, written by Ognjen Bodranović, at the opening of the 23rd Belgrade International Theatre Festival. During the festival, she also performed the piece Prvi obredni san (First Ritual Dream) by Vuk Kulenović, using acoustic sculptures by sculptor Vladimir Labat.

In 1989, she moved to Los Angeles, where she spent the next several years, performing in clubs with the band Baby Sister, also working in a marketing agency and as stock broker. During these several years, she organized several charity actions for the victims of Yugoslav Wars. During the years she spent in Los Angeles, she worked on improving her guitar skills, studying with Hollywood's MIT instructors like Scott Henderson, Bruce Bouillet, Scott Van Zen, James Hagadone and others.

=== Back in Serbia (1995–2024) ===
In 1995, Milošević returned to Belgrade. She recorded vocals for the song "Harmony", for Kornelije Kovač's 1996 album Moja generacija (My Generation). With her brother Goran Milošević (former vocalist of Generacija 5) she recorded the duet "Jednom će neko" ("Once Someone Will") for his 1996 album Da li misliš još na mene (Are You Still Thinking of Me). At the beginning of 1998, she released the compilation album Harmony, which featured her old ballads, as well as previously unreleased songs "Samsara", "Harmony", "Times Are Changing" and "Prvi sneg (Dolazi zima)" ("First Snow (Winter Is Coming)"). The latter was written by Dušan Mihajlović "Spira" and originally recorded by the band Suncokret in 1977, Milošević's version recorded in 1988 in cooperation with Mihajlović. The video for the title track was shot in Beijing and directed by Milošević herself. During the 1999 NATO bombing of Yugoslavia, Aleksandra and Goran Milošević recorded the anti-war song "Dosta suza" ("No More Tears"), which they wrote together. The song was later covered by Finnish singer Janne Hurme.

In 2000, Milošević released the album Animal Tested, which featured heavier rock sound that her previous releases and songs in both Serbian and English language. Milošević authored all the songs on the album, produced the album herself and played guitar, bass guitar, keyboards and percussion on the recording. Beside Milošević, album featured Dejan Nikolić (drums), Igor Malešević (drums), Matija Bartulac (bass guitar) and Vlada Novičić (bass guitar). The album featured a new version of her old hit "Sexy dama". The video for the album opening track, "Legalize Freedom", was banned from national television as it alluded to the authoritarian regime of Slobodan Milošević.

Slađana Milošević took an active role in the protests against Slobodan Milošević's regime. On 13 January 2000, the Serbian (Julian) New Year celebration day, Slađana Milošević appeared on the protest concert organized by Otpor! organization at the Belgrade's Republic Square, delivering the Most Resisting Media Reporter Award. During the year, she performed with her band on the Democratic Opposition rallies. She also took part in "Vreme je" ("The Time Has Come") project conceptualized by ANEM (Association of Independent Media) and the G17+ NGO. She sang and played in the song in support of the awakening of the democratic awareness in Serbia. After speaking at a press conference in Belgrade's Media Center in July 2000 with Mlađan Dinkić, one of G17+ leaders, she was arrested in her residence. There was neither explanation nor there were any charges brought up. After questioning, she was let free.

During the spring of 2002, in order to mark 25 years since her solo debut, she released three compilation albums entitled Metamorfoza (Metamorphosis), featuring selection of previously released songs as well as previously unreleased material. In 2007, she released the compilation album Fantastično putovanje, featuring bonus DVD with her music videos. In 2010, under the pseudonym Sweety, she recorded the song "Izdaja (Ja bih da odmorim dušu)" ("Betrayal (I Would Like to Rest My Soul") with the progressive/power metal band Alogia for the various artists album Vreme brutalnih dobronamernika (Time of Brutal Well-Intentioned People).

=== Other activities ===
Together with Jasmina Malešević, Milošević wrote a book of short stories entitled Adame, ne ljuti se (Don't Get Mad, Adam), published in 2001. Milošević promoted the book with an outdoor theatrical performance in Belgrade's Knez Mihailova Street. She wrote a two-volume book on the women's role in history entitled Muška žena (Male Woman), published in 2012. In 2016, she published the book on Nikola Tesla's visionary work, entitled Tri projekta Tesla (Three Tesla Projects).

In 2002, in Los Angeles she recorded a five-episode documentary series, Muzička industrija Amerike (American Music Industry), for the Radio Television of Serbia. For a short period of time, she hosted the show Animal Tested on Radio 202.

Milošević was a president of the Art Es Norma association and organized A Better World campaign, with the goal of raising awareness about the importance of copyright. As a part of an anti-piracy campaign, she composed the song "Osma i deveta zapovest" ("Eight and Ninth Commandment"), co-writing the lyrics with alternative rock musician Rambo Amadeus and rapper Voodoo Popeye.

== Family and death ==
Slađana Milošević's brother Goran Milošević was the vocalist for the hard rock band Generacija 5 and a solo artist.

Milošević died on 26 March 2024, at the age of 68 at a hospital in Zemun. For the last two years of her life she struggled with Sjögren syndrome. She was buried at the Lešće cemetery in Belgrade. Belgrade city authorities refused the requests for her burial at the Alley of Distinguished Citizens at the Belgrade New Cemetery, which caused negative reactions in a part of Serbian public.

== Legacy ==
Serbian pop punk band Oružjem Protivu Otmičara recorded a cover of Milošević's song "Miki, Miki" for their 2007 album Znaš ko te pozdravio (You Know Who Sends Regards). She appeared as a character in the Croatian TV series Black & White World, portrayed by actress Jelena Gavrilović, Milošević herself also making a cameo appearance in the series.

== Discography ==
=== Studio albums ===
- Gorim od želje da ubijem noć (1980)
- Neutral design (1983)
- Alexandra Slađana Milošević & Darko Kraljić (With Darko Kraljić, 1988)
- Animal Tested (2000)

=== Compilation albums ===
- The Best Of (with Dado Topić, 1989)
- Harmony (1998)
- Metamorfoza Vol.1 (2002)
- Metamorfoza Vol.2 (2002)
- Metamorfoza Vol.3 (2002)
- Fantastično putovanje (2007)

=== Singles ===
- "Au-au" / "Upali svetlo" (1977)
- "Simpatija" / "Bejbi" (1978)
- "Sexy dama" / "Vreme čini čuda" (1978)
- "Recept za ljubav" / "Srećan ti rođendan" (1981)
- "Miki, Miki" / "Das Licht Von Kairo (Svetla Kaira)" (1983)
- "Princeza" (maxi single, with Dado Topić, 1984)

== Bibliography ==
=== Fiction ===
- Adame, ne ljuti se (with Jasmina Malešević, 2001)

=== Nonfiction ===
- Muška žena (2012)
- Tri projekta Tesla (2016)

Awards and achievements
Preceded by Nina Petković	Pjesma Mediterana winner (with Dado Topić); 2010	Succeeded by TBD
