= Raša Đelmaš =

Serbian musical artist (1950–2021)

- Raša Đelmaš in 1995

Background information
- Born: January 26, 1950; Belgrade, PR Serbia, FPR Yugoslavia
- Died: October 28, 2021 (aged 71) Belgrade, Serbia
- Genres: Rock; progressive rock; hard rock; folk rock; blues rock
- Occupations: Musician, songwriter
- Instruments: Drums, keyboards, vocals
- Labels: Jugoton, PGP-RTB, ZKP RTLJ, Diskoton, PGP-RTS, Croatia Records
- Formerly of: Pop Mašina; Siluete; YU Grupa; Zebra

Ratislav "Raša" Ðelmaš (Serbian Cyrillic: Ратислав-Раша Ђелмаш; 26 January 1950 – 28 October 2021) was a Serbian and Yugoslav rock musician, best known as a member of the bands YU Grupa and Zebra.

== Musical career ==
Đelmaš started his career as the drummer in the band Anđeli (The Angels), continuing in the bands Hendriksova Deca (Hendrix's Children), Mobi Dik (Moby Dick) and Felix. In 1972, he was a forming member of Pop Mašina, later that year he moved to Siluete, and finally to YU Grupa. With YU Grupa he recorded commercially successful and critically acclaimed albums YU Grupa (1973), Kako to da svaki dan? (1974) and YU Grupa (1975), before leaving the group and forming Zebra in 1976. With Zebra he recorded the album Kažu da takav je red (They Say That's the Way It Should Be, 1979), on which he played drums and keyboards and sang. Zebra disbanded in 1979 due to lack of commercial and critical success of their only album.

In 1982, Đelmaš released hard rock-oriented solo album Hot rock. The album featured Đelmaš on vocals and drums, Zoran Nastoski of the band Magično Oko on vocals, Laza Ristovski on keyboards, Đelmaš's former bandmate from YU Grupa Bata Kostić on guitar, and Lola Andrijić on bass guitar. The lyrics were written by Đelmaš's former bandmate from Zebra Anka Lazarević, who also sang backing vocals on the album. In 1989, Đelmaš returned to YU Grupa, recording two more albums with them, Tragovi (1990) and Rim 1994 (1995). After leaving YU Grupa for the second time, he retired from music.

== Other activities ==
Soon after the release of his only solo album in 1982, Đelmaš retired from the scene for several years, dedicating himself to his restaurant Barakuda. After retiring from music in the 1990s, he dedicated himself to car racing, influenced by his brother Miodrag Đelmaš, a successful race car driver. Ratislav Đelmaš's first race car was Mazda 323 GTR. Although he started his career when he was 45, he had moderate success, ending every race among top five drivers (although never winning a first place).

== Death ==
Đelmaš died in Belgrade on 28 October 2021, at the age of 71.

== Family ==
Ratislav Đelmaš is father of Aleksandra Đelmaš, vocalist for the band Destiny Potato. Destiny Potato was formed by David "Maxim" Micić, the son of another former YU Grupa drummer, Dragan Micić.

== Discography ==
=== With YU Grupa ===
==== Studio albums ====
- YU Grupa (1973)
- Kako to da svaki dan? (1974)
- YU Grupa (1975)
- Tragovi (1990)
- Rim 1994 (1995)

==== Live albums ====
- Live (2007)

==== Singles ====
- "Šta će meni vatra" / "Spusti glavu" (1973)
- "Drveni most" / "Živi pesak" (1974)
- "Sama" / "Trka" (1975)
- "Osveta" / "Oprosti ljubavi" (1976)
- "3 do 6" / "Tačno u podne" (1976)

=== With Zebra ===
==== Studio albums ====
- Kažu da takav je red (1979)

==== EPs ====
- Telefon (1977)

==== Singles ====
- "Moja mala zebra" / "Šumadinka plava" (1977)
- "Ma ko si ti" / "Motor" (1978)

=== Solo ===
==== Studio albums ====
- Hot rok (1982)
