= Dragi Jelić =

Serbian rock musician (born 1947)

Dragi Jelić Драги Јелић
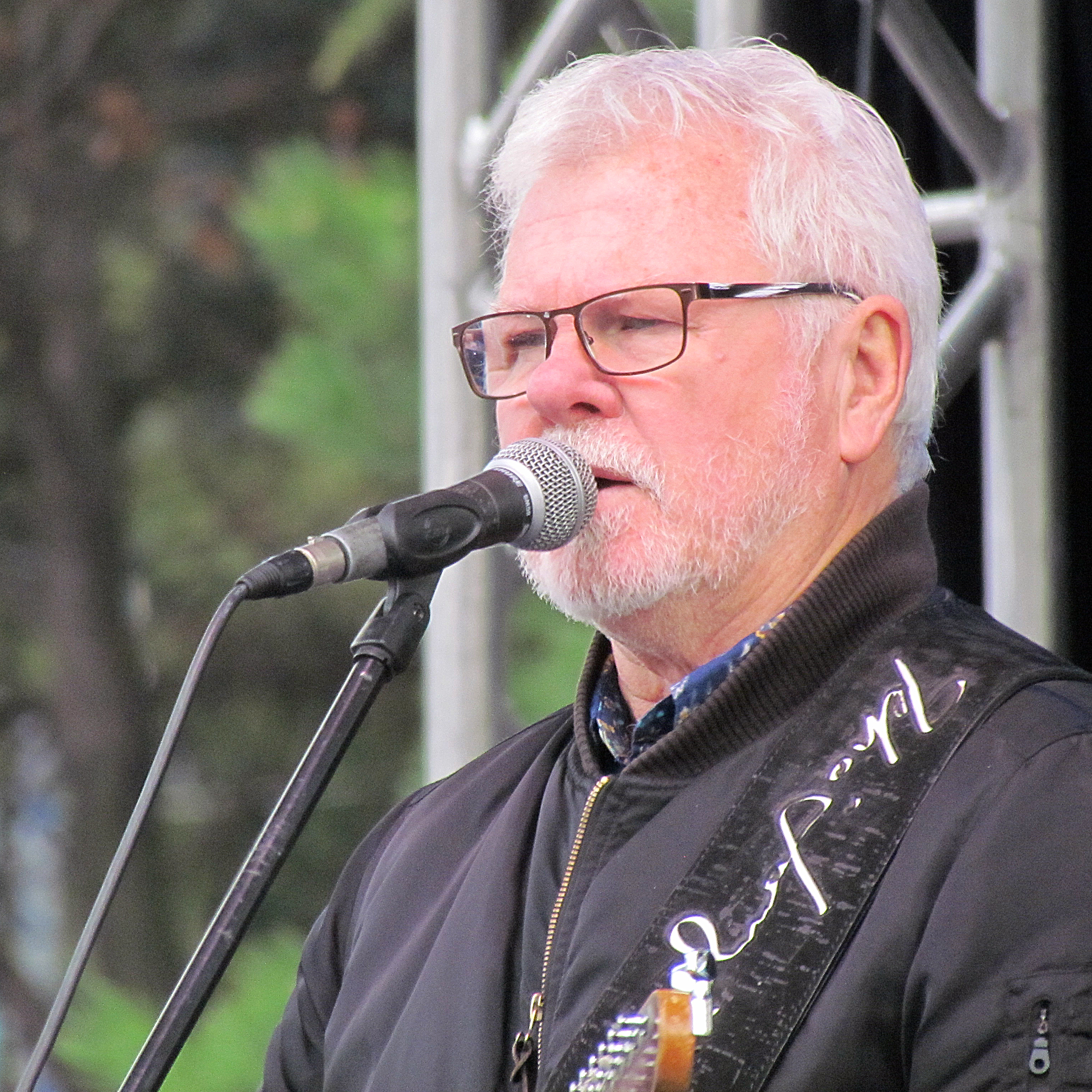
- Jelić performing at a concert in Belgrade, January 2018

Background information
- Born: 17 May 1947 (age 79); Kraljevo, PR Serbia, FPR Yugoslavia
- Genres: Hard rock, progressive rock, folk rock, blues rock
- Occupations: Musician, songwriter, producer
- Instruments: Vocals, guitar,
- Years active: 1966–present
- Labels: PGP-RTB, Jugoton, ZKP RTLJ, PGP-RTS, Croatia Records
- Website: YU grupa official site

Dragi Jelić (Serbian Cyrillic: Драги Јелић; born 17 May 1947) is a Serbian rock musician. He is best known as the singer and guitarist for the Serbian rock band YU Grupa, which he formed in 1970 with his older brother Žika.

During the 1960s, alongside his brother, Jelić was also a member of the beat band Džentlmeni.

== Discography ==
=== With Džentlmeni ===
==== Extended plays ====
- Idi (1968)
- Slomljena srca (1969)

==== Singles ====
- "Ona je moja" (1970)

==== Compilation albums ====
- Antologija (2006)
