= Žika Jelić =

Serbian rock musician (born 1942)

Žika Jelić Жика Јелић
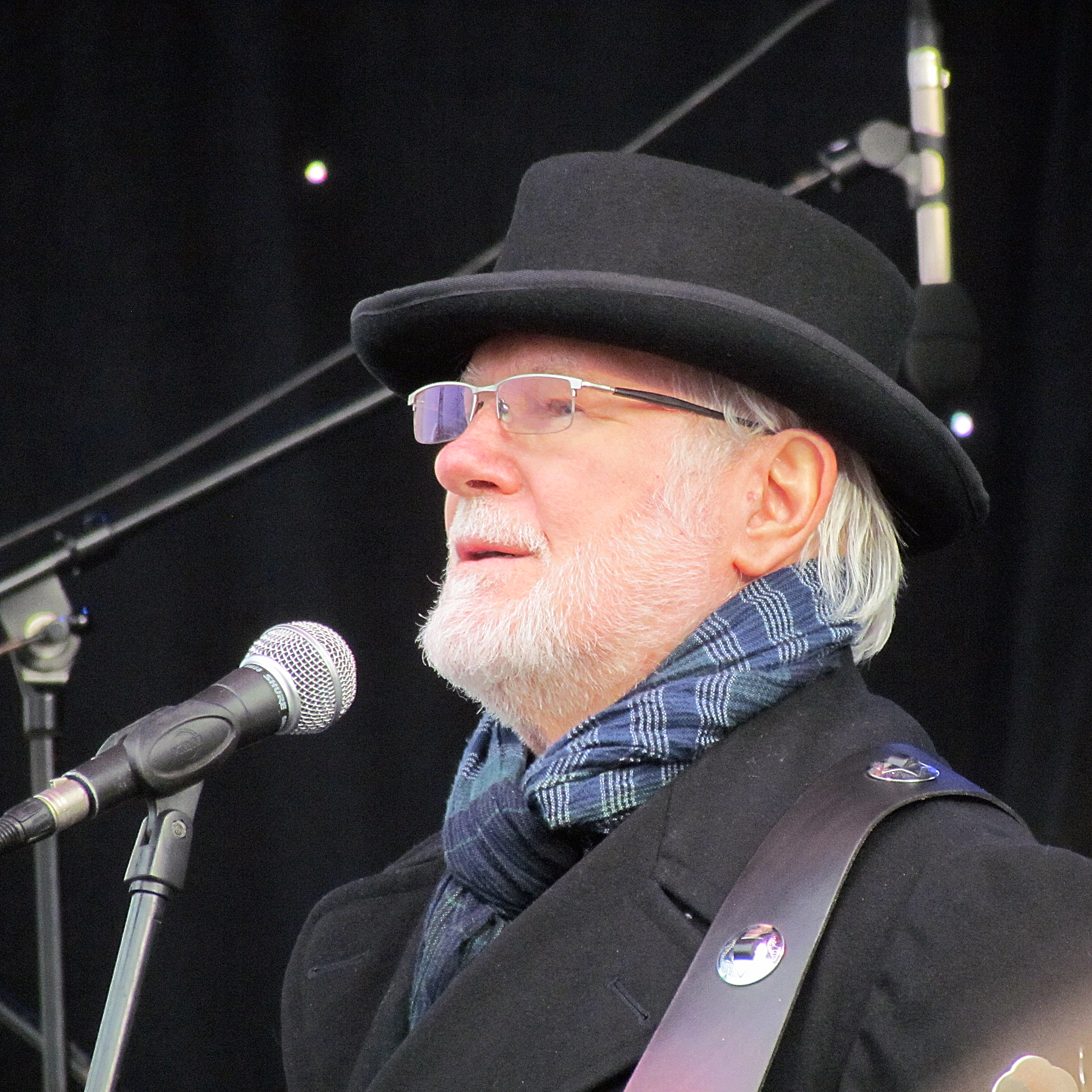
- Jelić performing at a concert in Belgrade, January 2018

Background information
- Born: Živorad Jelić; 7 December 1942 (age 83); Kraljevo, PR Serbia, FPR Yugoslavia
- Genres: Hard rock, progressive rock, folk rock, blues rock
- Occupations: Musician, songwriter, producer
- Instruments: Vocals, guitar, bass guitar
- Years active: 1966–present
- Labels: PGP-RTB, Jugoton, ZKP RTLJ, PGP-RTS, Croatia Records
- Member of: YU grupa
- Formerly of: Džentlmeni
- Website: YU grupa official site

Živorad "Žika" Jelić (Serbian Cyrillic: Живорад "Жика" Јелић; born 7 December 1942) is a Serbian rock musician. He is best known as being the Bass guitarist for the Serbian rock band YU Grupa, which he formed in 1970 with his younger brother Dragi.

During the 1960s, alongside his brother, Jelić was also a member of the beat band Džentlmeni.

== Discography ==
=== With Džentlmeni ===
==== Extended plays ====
- Idi (1968)
- Slomljena srca (1969)

==== Singles ====
- "Ona je moja" (1970)

==== Compilation albums ====
- Antologija (2006)
