= Na izvoru svetlosti =

Studio album by Pop Mašina
- Released: 1975
- Recorded: 4–7 February 1975, Akademik Studio, Ljubljana; 2 January 1974, Belgrade Sports Hall, Belgrade
- Genre: Progressive rock; hard rock; blues rock
- Label: ZKP RTLJ
- Producer: Robert Nemeček; Ivo Umek

Pop Mašina chronology
Kiselina (1973)	Na izvoru svetlosti (1975)	Put ka Suncu (1976)

Na izvoru svetlosti (trans. At the Spring of Light) is the second and the last studio album by Yugoslav progressive rock band Pop Mašina, released in 1975.

== Background and recording ==
The album was recorded from September 4–7, 1975 in Akademik Studio in Ljubljana, with the exception of the blues track "Negde daleko", recorded on the band's performance in Belgrade Sports Hall on 2 January 1974. It was produced by the band's bass guitarist and vocalist Robert Nemeček and Ivo Umek. The album featured guest appearances by S Vremena Na Vreme member Ljuba Ninković and keyboardist and composer Sloba Marković. Both of them appeared as guests on Pop Mašina's previous album, Kiselina (Acid).

The song "Rekvijem za prijatelja" ("Requiem for a Friend"), with lyrics written by Ljuba Ninković, was dedicated to Predrag Jovičić, the vocalist of the band San, who earlier that year died from an electric shock on a concert in Čair Sports Center in Niš. The song was musically inspired by Johann Sebastian Bach's choral composition and featured a string quartet. The album featured a new version of the song "Zemlja svetlosti", previously released on a 7-inch single.

== Track listing ==
Side A
No.	Title	Author	Length
1.	"Vreme za nas" ("Time for Us")	Robert Nemeček	5:55
2.	"Negde daleko" ("Somewhere Far Away")	Zoran Božinović	6:46
3.	"Rekvijem za prijatelja" ("Requiem for a Friend")	Ljuba Ninković, Nebojša Ignjatović, Robert Nemeček, Sloba Marković	4:11

Side B
No.	Title	Author	Length
1.	"Sećanja" ("Memories")	Zoran Božinović	4:24
2.	"Na izvoru" ("At the Spring")	Zoran Božinović	5:11
3.	"Zemlja svetlosti" ("Land of Light")	Robert Nemeček	6:09
4.	"Kraj II" ("End II")	Robert Nemeček	1:27

== Personnel ==
- Robert Nemeček – bass guitar, acoustic guitar, percussion, vocals, producer
- Zoran Božinović – guitar, vocals
- Mihajlo Popović – drums, percussion

=== Additional personnel ===
- Ljuba Ninkovič – acoustic guitar, percussion
- Sloba Marković – organ, piano, synthesizer
- Anton Čare – cello
- Stane Demšar – cello
- Božo Mihelčič – violin
- Karel Žužek – violin
- Franjo Bergar – oboe
- Ivo Umek – producer
- Miro Bevc – engineer
- Marko Petretič – recording assistant
- Aca Radojčić – recording ("Negde daleko")
- Mile Miletić – mixing ("Negde daleko")
- Jugoslav Vlahović – cover, graphic design

== Reissues ==
The album was reissued in 2008, on vinyl, by Austrian record label Atlantide.

== Legacy ==
In 2021 the song "Sećanja" was ranked No.58 on the list of 100 Greatest Yugoslav Hard & Heavy Anthems by web magazine Balkanrock.

== Covers ==
The song "Zemlja svetlosti" was covered by Serbian alternative rock band Disciplina Kičme on their 1991 album Nova iznenađenja za nova pokolenja (New Surprises for New Generations).

The song "Sećanja" ("Memories") was covered by Serbian singer-songwriter Nikola Čuturilo on his 2011 album Tu i sad (Here and Now), the track featuring guest appearance by Vidoja Božinović, a member of Pop Mašina's last lineup and Čuturilo's former bandmate from Riblja Čorba.
