= Rok Mašina =

Yugoslav hard rock group (1980–1982)

- The original lineup of Rok Mašina, from left to right: Vladan Dokić, Robert Nemeček, Zoran Božinović and Vidoja Božinović

Background information
- Origin: Belgrade, SR Serbia, SFR Yugoslavia
- Genres: Hard rock; heavy metal
- Years active: 1980–1982
- Labels: Jugodisk, One, Multimedia Music
- Spinoff of: Pop Mašina
- Past members: Robert Nemeček; Zoran Božinović; Vidoja Božinović; Vladan Dokić; Dragan Đorđević

Rok Mašina (Serbian Cyrillic: Рок Машина; trans. Rock Machine) was a short-lasting Yugoslav hard rock and heavy metal band formed in Belgrade in 1980. Formed by former members of the progressive/hard rock band Pop Mašina Robert Nemeček (vocals and bass guitar) and brothers Zoran and Vidoja Božinović (guitars), Rok Mašina released only one studio album, Rok Mašina, before disbanding in 1982, while in the midst of recording of their second album. Part of the material recorded for their second album appeared in 1983 on the influential mini-album Izrod na granici.

== Band history ==
=== 1980–1982 ===
The band was formed in 1980 by former Pop Mašina members Robert Nemeček (vocals and bass guitar) and brothers Zoran and Vidoja Božinović (guitars), with Vladan Dokić (formerly of the bands Pop Šou and Opus, drums). With Rok Mašina, Nemeček and the Božinović brothers turned towards heavier, less complex sound than Pop Mašina's progressive/hard rock sound with blues, psychedelic and acid rock elements.

The band had its debut live appearance in 1980 in Zagreb, as a part of the event named Pozdrav iz Beograda (Greetings from Belgrade). Later that year, the band released the 7-inch single with the songs "Vatra" ("Fire") and "Bilo mi je bolje" ("I Felt Better"). In 1981, the band released their only studio album, Rok Mašina, through Jugodisk record label. Part of the album lyrics were written by Dragana Stanaćev and Koviljka Milić, actresses of the Teatar Levo (Left Theatre) theatre, and the album featured Ljuba Ninković (formerly of S Vremena Na Vreme) and Dragan Popović (formerly of DAG) on backing vocals. The album was produced by Nemeček and featured, beside new tracks, new versions of previously released "Vatra" and "Bilo mi je bolje". After the album release, Dragan Đorđević, a former member of Generacija 5, replaced Dokić. However, as at the time of the great popularity of new wave bands in Yugoslavia the future for the band did not seem very promising, they disbanded in 1982, in the midst of recording their second studio album. They had their last performance on the Belgrade Rock Festival held in Pionir Hall in September 1982.

=== Post-breakup ===
Part of the material recorded for the band's second studio album was released by Jugodisk in 1983 on the mini-album Izrod na granici (Bastard on the Border). The album featured a live version of the song "Bilo mi je bolje", recorded at the 1982 Belgrade Rock Festival, on the band's last live performance. The song "Promašen san" ("Failed Dream") featured a recording of Aleister Crowley's voice. The album cover was designed by Jugoslav Vlahović. The original cover, also designed by Vlahović, should have featured two hands with feathers thrust through them and the bands logo and album title written in red, but was, as Robert Nemeček stated in 1983, refused by the Jugodisk as "politically problematic".

After Rok Mašina disbanded, Zoran Božinović retired from music. In the late 1990s, he returned to performing, starting to perform with the blues rock band Zona B. He died on 12 July 2004. Vidoja Božinović dedicated himself to his studies of architecture at the Belgrade Faculty of Architecture. He would occasionally perform in blues clubs and with the jazz band Interaction, before joining the highly popular band Riblja Čorba in 1985. Robert Nemeček became the film program editor at TV Politika. He later worked as program editor on TV Pink and Radio Television of Serbia and eventually as the editor-in-chief of TV Avala.

In 1994, the band's song "Nulti čas" ("Zero Hour") was released on Komuna compilation album Pakleni vozači: Jugoslovenski hard rock (Hell Riders: Yugoslav Hard Rock). In 2001, One Records released the compilation album entitled Rok Mašina, which featured all the tracks from both their self-titled debut and Izrod na granici.

In 2008, Nemeček released a collection of Pop Mašina recordings on the box set Antologija 1972 – 1976 (Anthology 1972 – 1976). During the following years, Vidoja Božinović tried to persuade him to do the similar thing with Rok Mašina recordings. Finally, in 2015, the compilation album Antologija 1980 – 1983 was released through Multimedia Music. The songs released on the album were remastered by Nemeček himself and his son Jan. The compilation featured all the material officially released by Rok Mašina, previously unreleased recordings and a book about the band. The previously unreleased recordings included the song "Umbra Zonule" (Latin for "Twilight Zone"), originally performed by Nemeček's 1960s band Dogovor iz 1804. and later recorded by Rok Mašina.

Robert Nemeček died in Belgrade on 8 January 2024.

== Legacy ==
In 2012, Serbian alternative rock band Kanda, Kodža i Nebojša recorded a cover of Rok Mašina's song "Granica" ("Border") for the New Year's Eve edition of Radio Television of Serbia show Bunt (Rebellion). In 2019, the same song was covered by Serbian blues rock band Texas Flood on their cover album Tražim ljude kao ja (I'm Looking for the People like Me). The song "Nulti čas" was covered in 2018 by Serbian heavy metal band Orvel 69 on their self-titled EP.

== Discography ==
=== Studio albums ===
- Rok Mašina (1981)
- Izrod na granici (1983)

=== Compilations ===
- Rok Mašina (2001)
- Antologija 1980 - 1983 (2015)

=== Singles ===
- "Vatra" / "Bilo mi je bolje" (1980)

== See also ==
- Pop Mašina
