= List of media organisations in Belgrade =

This is a list of media organisations based in Belgrade, Serbia.

== Radio stations ==
- Radio Beograd
- Radio Beograd 202
- Radio Beta RFI
- Radio B92
- Radio Index
- Radio Barajevo
- Radio Lazarevac
- Radio Tri FM
- Radio Novosti
- Radio Nostalgija
- Radio Pingvin
- Radio Top FM
- Radio S
- Radio Studio B
- City Radio

== Television stations ==
- Art TV
- Radio Television of Serbia (RTS)
- TV B92
- Enter TV
- TV Kanal D
- TV Košava
- TV Metropolis
- RTV Pink
- RTV Politika
- TV Sos Kanal
- TV Stankom
- RTV Studio B
- Happy TV
- Info-TV (formerly YU-info) (defunct)

== Television production companies ==
- Produkcijska Grupa Mreža
- Video nedeljnik VIN
- Advance
- DТV Production
- Total Magic

== Press agencies ==
- Таnјug
- Beta
- FoNet
- Tiker
