= Izrod na granici =

Studio album by Rok Mašina
- Released: 1983
- Recorded: 1982
- Genre: Hard rock; heavy metal
- Length: 22:57
- Label: Jugodisk
- Producer: Robert Nemeček

Rok Mašina chronology
Rok Mašina (1981)	Izrod na granici (1983)	Rok Mašina (2001)

Izrod na granici (trans. Bastard on the Border) is a mini-album by Yugoslav hard rock and heavy metal band Rok Mašina, released in 1983. The album was released after the band disbanded in 1982, and featured a part of the material they had recorded while working on their second studio album.

== Background ==
Rok Mašina was formed in 1980 by former Pop Mašina members Robert Nemeček (vocals and bass guitar) and brothers Zoran and Vidoja Božinović (guitars), with Vladan Dokić (drums), and released their debut and only full-length studio album, Rok Mašina, in 1981. After the album release, Dragan Đorđević, a former member of Generacija 5, replaced Dokić. However, as at the time of the great popularity of new wave bands in Yugoslavia the future for Rok Mašina did not seem very promising, they disbanded in 1982, in the midst of recording their second studio album. Part of the material recorded for the second album was released posthumously in 1983 on Izrod na granici. The album featured a live version of the song "Bilo mi je bolje" ("I Felt Better"), recorded on the Belgrade Rock Festival held in Pionir Hall in September 1982, which was also the last live performance by Rok Mašina. The song "Promašen san" ("Failed Dream") features a recording of Aleister Crowley's voice.

== Album cover ==
The album cover was designed by Jugoslav Vlahović. The original album cover, also designed by Vlahović, should have featured two hands with feathers thrust through them and the bands logo and album title written in red. However, the cover was, as the band's leader Robert Nemeček stated at the time, refused by the band's label, Jugodisk, as "politically problematic". The label soon denied Nemeček's claims, stating that the original artwork was refused as "it might allude to some other things", but that it was not politically problematic.

== Track listing ==
No.	Title	Writer(s)	Length
1.	"Granica" ("Border")	Zoran Božinović	4:13
2.	"Nulti čas" ("Zero Hour")	Robert Nemeček; Vidoja Božinović	6:53
3.	"Rokenrol" ("Rock 'n' Roll")	Robert Nemeček; Vidoja Božinović; Zoran Božinović	3:27
4.	"Bilo mi je bolje" ("I Felt Better")	Zoran Božinović	3:43
5.	"Promašen san" ("Failed Dream")	Robert Nemeček	4:41

== Personnel ==
- Robert Nemeček - bass guitar, production
- Zoran Božinović - guitar, vocals
- Vidoja Božinović - guitar
- Boban Đorđević - drums

=== Additional personnel ===
- Rade Ercegovac - engineer
- Jugoslav Vlahović - cover design

== Legacy ==
In 2021, the songs "Granica" and "Nulti čas" were ranked 16th and 39th respectively on the list of 100 Greatest Yugoslav Hard & Heavy Anthems by web magazine Balkanrock.

== Covers ==
- In 2012, Serbian alternative rock band Kanda, Kodža i Nebojša recorded a cover of "Granica" ("Border") for the New Year's Eve edition of Radio Television of Serbia show Bunt (Rebellion).
- In 2016, Serbian blues rock band Texas Flood covered "Granica" on their cover album Tražim ljude kao ja (Im Looking for the People like Me).
- In 2019, Serbian heavy metal band Orvel 69 covered "Nulti čas" on their self-titled EP.
