= Robert Nemeček =

Serbian and Yugoslav musician (1949–2024)

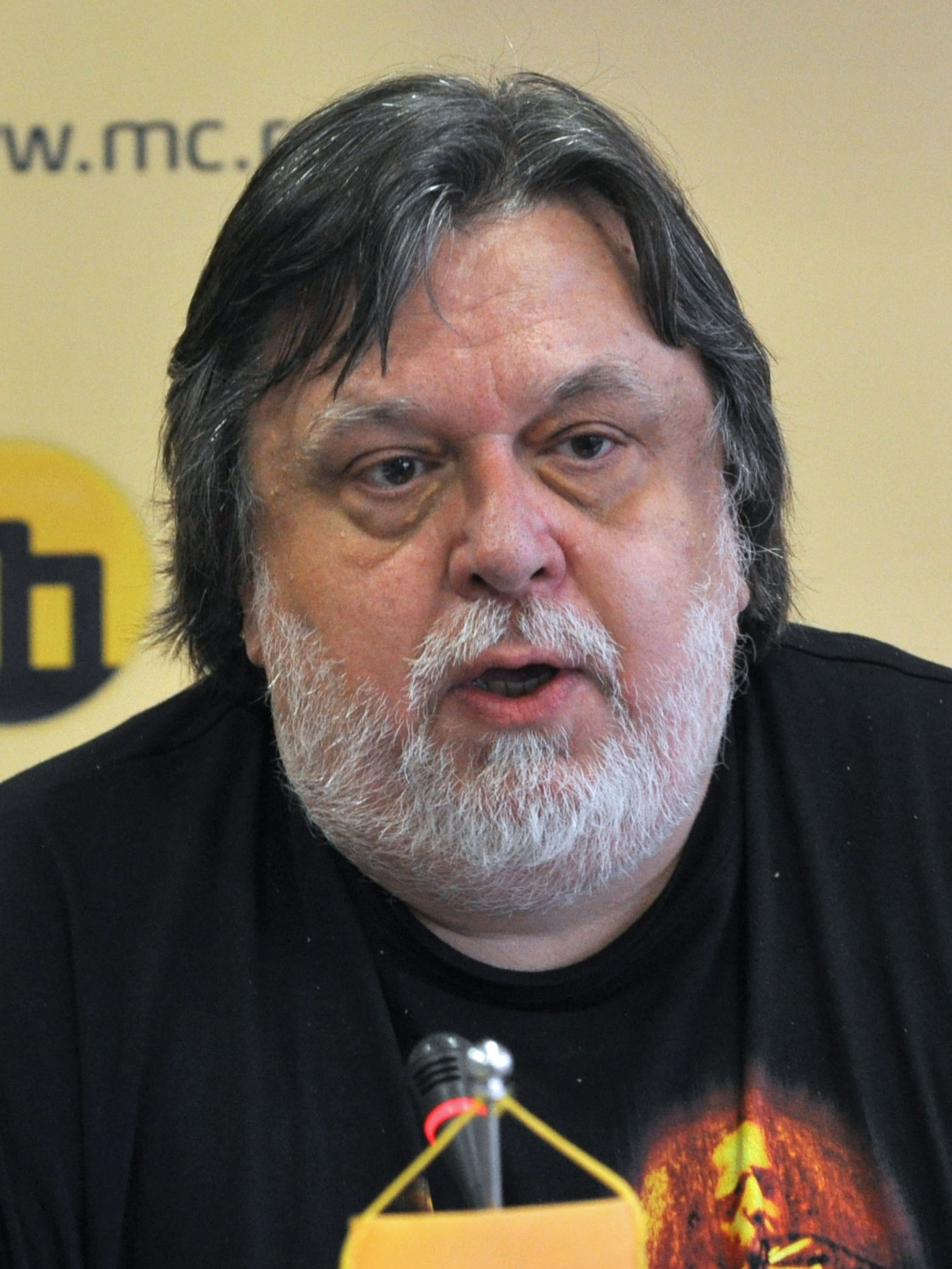
- Nemeček in 2008
- Born: 26 May 1949; Belgrade, PR Serbia, FPR Yugoslavia
- Died: 6 January 2024 (aged 74); Belgrade, Serbia
- Occupations: Musician, music producer, editor
- Years active: 1968–2024
- Musical career
- Genres: Progressive rock; psychedelic rock; hard rock; blues rock; acid rock; heavy metal
- Instrument: Bass guitar, vocals
- Labels: Jugodisk; Jugoton; PGP-RTB
- Formerly of: Dogovor iz 1804.; Džentlmeni; Pop Mašina; Rok Mašina

Robert Nemeček (Serbian Cyrillic: Роберт Немечек, 26 May 1949 – 9 January 2024) was a Serbian and Yugoslav musician, music producer, television editor, and organizer of events related to music.

Nemeček started his musical career as a member of the progressive/psychedelic rock band Dogovor iz 1804. After the group ended its activity, Nemeček shortly played with one of the last lineups of Džentlmeni, before forming the progressive rock band Pop Mašina in 1972. The band achieved nationwide success, disbanding in 1978. In 1980, Nemeček, with other former members of Pop Mašina, formed the short-lasting but influential hard rock and heavy metal band Rok Mašina. After Rok Mašina disbanded in 1982, Nemeček retired from music.

Nemeček started his career in the media in the late 1970s, as correspondent from London for Yugoslav magazines. He worked in Dadov Theatre as an editor of the theatre's rock concerts program, before becoming the film program editor at RTV Politika. In the 1990s he became the editor of film program on Television Pink, later moving to Radio Television of Serbia, where he was assistant general director, eventually becoming the editor-in-chief TV Avala. From 2010 until his death he was working as a freelance media consultant.

== Biography ==
=== Early life ===
Nemeček was born on 26 May 1949 in Belgrade. His father Jan was a violinist, and his mother Divna, née Stefanović, was an accountant. His musical heritage began with his great-grandfather, a gifted violinist who traveled from the Czech Republic at the end of the 19th century to join the royal orchestra in the Kingdom of Serbia. This tradition related to music continued through the following generations, with his grandfather Josip Nemeček, who played a key role in founding the Belgrade Philharmonic and worked as a lecturer and a performer at the Belgrade Opera, and father Jan. The family's musical influence extended to Ludwig, Nemeček's uncle, who played jazz trumpet, and Ludmila, his aunt, a dedicated member of the Belgrade Madrigalists.

=== Musical career ===
Nemeček started his musical career as a member of the progressive/psychedelic rock band Dogovor iz 1804. (transl. The 1804 Agreement, the name alluding to the beginning of the First Serbian Uprising in 1804), formed in 1968 by Nemeček (bass guitar) and Nebojša "Nebe" Ignjatović (acoustic guitar, piano, flute, vocals). Although short-lived, the group was notable as one of the pioneers of the Yugoslav progressive and psychedelic rock scenes. After the band split up in 1970, Nemeček moved to the band Džentlmeni (The Gentlemen), performing in one of the last lineups of the band. Soon after the formation, Bojić left the band, Nemeček and Božinović taking over vocal duties.

In 1972, Nemeček formed the progressive rock band Pop Mašina (Pop Machine) with Zoran Božinović (guitar), Ratislav "Raša" Đelmaš (drums) and Sava Bojić (vocals). Soon after the formation, Bojić left the band, Nemeček and Božinović taking over vocal duties. One of the first bands on the Yugoslav rock scene to move from jazz- and classical music-influenced progressive rock towards heavier rock sound, Pop Mašina managed to gain large popularity with their hard rock sound with blues, psychedelic and acid rock elements. With Pop Mašina Nemeček recorded two studio albums and a live album—the band's debut Kiselina (Acid) today considered one of the most notable records in the history of Yugoslav rock music—before leaving the band in 1976 to serve his mandatory stint in the Yugoslav army, Pop Mašina continuing without him and eventually disbanding in 1978. In 1980, Nemeček, Zoran Božinović, guitarist Vidoja Božinović and drummer Vladan Dokić formed the hard rock and heavy metal band Rok Mašina (Rock Machine). The group recorded only one album before disbanding in 1982, a part of the material they recorded for their second studio album ending up on a posthumous mini album.

During his musical career, Nemeček produced, beside Pop Mašina's live album Put ka Suncu (Road to Sun) and both Rok Mašina albums, albums by several prominent acts of the Yugoslav scene. He produced Balkan albums Gola Istina (Bare Truth) and Na brdovitom Balkanu (On the Mountainous Balkans), Tunel albums Noćni prolaz (Night Passage) and Niz tri tamne ulice (Along Three Dark Streets) and Đorđe Ilijin album Zabranjeno prisluškivanje (No Eavesdropping).

=== Media career ===
After his army service ended, Nemeček relocated to London, where he remained until 1979. After his return from London, he worked in Dadov Theatre as an editor of the theatre's rock concerts program. He moved to London again from 1983 to 1988, where, among other things, he was a correspondent for various papers under the umbrella of Politika a.d., like RTV revija (Radio and Television Revue), YU video and Pop Rock.

Nemeček started his career in television as becoming the film program editor at RTV Politika. In the 1990s he became the editor of film program on Television Pink, introducing the Serbian public to The Simpsons, The X-Files, Friends, La Femme Nikita, The Sopranos and other series. from April 2004 to April 2007 he was the assistant general director on Radio Television of Serbia. From February to December 2010, he was the editor-in-chief of TV Avala.

=== Death ===
Nemeček died in Belgrade on 9 January 2024, at the age of 74.
