= Balkan (band) =

Serbian hard rock band

- Balkan in 1982

Background information
- Origin: Novi Sad, SR Serbia, SFR Yugoslavia
- Genres: Hard rock; rock
- Years active: 1982–1989; 2004–2018
- Labels: Jugodisk, Panonija Koncert, Raglas Records, One Records, Take It Or Leave It Records, MCF Records
- Past members: Aleksandar Cvetković; Željko Jerković; Saša Zavišić; Radivoj Bugarski; Zlatko Marušić; Miroslav Papić; Željko Glamočanin; Zoran Vasiljević; Stanimir Gucunski; Dragan Radukin; Enver Grekoli; Zoran Stanković

Balkan (Serbian Cyrillic: Балкан; transl. Balkans) was a Serbian and Yugoslav rock band formed in Novi Sad in 1982. Formed and led by guitarist and vocalist Aleksandar "Leki" Cvetković, Balkan were known for their lyrics with social commentary critical of the Yugoslav social reality.

== Band history ==
=== 1982–1989 ===
Balkan evolved from the hard rock band Leki, led by guitarist and vocalist Aleksandar "Leki" Cvetković (and named after his nickname), which existed for a number of years but managed to gain only some local popularity. After Leki's 1982 performance on the Gitarijada festival in Zaječar, the band, after the suggestion of their manager Dragan Veljkovski, changed their name to Balkan. Balkan's sound was hard rock-oriented, but, influenced by the Yugoslav new wave scene, featured elements of new wave and ska, and Cvetković's social-related lyrics were influenced by the lyrics of Riblja Čorba frontman Bora Đorđević and Azra frontman Branimir Štulić.

At the beginning of their career, Balkan performed as an opening band on Divlje Jagode, Riblja Čorba, Rok Mašina, Parni Valjak, Drugi Način, Galija and Atomsko Sklonište concerts in Vojvodina, going through several lineup changes. The lineup which recorded Balkan's debut album Gola istina (Bare Truth) consisted of Cvetković, Željko Jerković (guitar), Saša Zavišić (bass guitar) and Radivoj Bugarski (drums). The album was produced by Rok Mašina member Robert Nemeček and released at the end of 1982. The album lyrics dealt with social subjects and described the problems of the Yugoslav working class. The song "Trideset peta-šesta" ("'35-'36"), which Cvetković originally wrote in 1971 and dedicated to his father, became a major hit for the band. The album was well received by the critics and the audience, selling more than 30.000 copies. After the album release, Balkan performed as the opening band on Riblja Čorba and Divlje Jagode tours and on youth work actions across Yugoslavia.

In October 1983, Balkan released their second studio album, Na brdovitom Balkanu (On the Mountainous Balkans), produced by Nemeček and featuring lyrics dealing with similar subjects as on Gola istina. It was recorded in the new lineup of the band which, besides Cvetković and Jerković, featured Zlatko Marušić (bass guitar) and Miroslav Papić (drums), and featured guest appearances by guitarist Vidoja "Džindžer" Božinović and drummer Boban Petrović. The album featured harder sound than the band's previous release and brought the minor hit "Svečanost" ("Celebration"). In 1985, Balkan released the album Homo Balcanicus, produced by Srđan Marjanović, continuing their saga about the poor. On June 15 of the same year, Balkan, alongside 23 other acts, performed on the Red Star Stadium in Belgrade, on the concert which was a part of YU Rock Misija, a Yugoslav contribution to Live Aid. However, Homo Balcanicus saw little critical and commercial success, and the band went on hiatus.

After a longer break, in 1989, in the lineup featuring Cvetković (vocals, guitar), Željko Jerković (guitar), Radivoj Bugarski (drums), Željko Glamočanin (bass guitar), and Zoran Vasiljević (keyboards), Balkan recorded the album Kome verovati (Who to Trust), with lyrics filled with disappointment and pessimism. The album featured the song "Trideset peta-šesta II deo" ("'35-'36 Part II"), which tells how the father from "Trideset peta-šesta" finally found peace after his death. The album was produced by Cvetković and Milan Ćirić and featured a guest appearance by Divlje Jagode guitarist Sead Lipovača and the choir of the Mihajlo Pupin Elementary School from Veternik. After Kome verovati was released, Balkan held only several concerts and officially disbanded, Cvetković moving to Vienna at the outbreak of Yugoslav Wars.

In 1996 Balkan's first two albums were reissued by Raglas Records on a single disc entitled Na brdovitom Balkanu.

=== 2004–2018 ===
In 2004, Cvetković reformed the band in the lineup featuring himself, Bugarski and bass guitarist Stanimir Gucunski. The new lineup recorded the album Boli me nepravda (Injustice Hurts Me), produced by Marinko Vukmanović and released in 2007. The album featured guest appearances by Divlje Jagode guitarist Sead "Zele" Lipovača, Osvajači guitarist Dragan Urošević, keyboardist Laza Ristovski and choir of the Temple of Saint Simeon the Myrrh–streaming from Veternik. The song "Bili smo drugari" ("We Were Friends") featured lyrics written by comic book artist Gradimir Smudja. During the same year, MCF Records released the double compilation album Antologija 1982-2007 (Anthology 1982-2007). After the album release, the band performed occasionally only, due to Cvetković still residing in Vienna, in the lineup featuring Cvetković (guitar, vocals), Stanimir Gucunski (bass guitar), Dragan Radukin (guitar), Enver Grekoli (drums) and Zoran Stanković (keyboards).

In 2019, JD Production record label released the double compilation album Sećanje na stvarnost (Memory of Reality).

== Discography ==
=== Studio albums ===
- Gola istina (1982)
- Na brdovitom Balkanu (1983)
- Homo Balcanicus (1985)
- Kome verovati (1989)
- Boli me nepravda (2007)

=== Compilations ===
- Na brdovitom Balkanu (1996)
- Najlepše pesme 1982–2003 (2004)
- Sećanje na stvarnost (2019)
