= Dušan Prelević =

Serbian musician and journalist

- Born: November 11, 1948; Belgrade, PR Serbia, FPR Yugoslavia
- Died: July 28, 2007 (aged 58); Belgrade, Serbia
- Occupations: Musician, journalist, writer
- Years active: 1965-2007
- Musical career
- Genres: Soul; rhythm and blues; jazz; rock
- Instrument: Vocals
- Labels: PGP-RTB; Diskos; Studio B; PGP-RTS
- Formerly of: Tomi Sovilj i Njegove Siluete; Korni Grupa; Oliver; Opus
- Website: www.dusanprelevic.rs

Dušan Prelević "Prele" (Serbian Cyrillic: Душан Прелевић Преле; 11 November 1948 – 28 July 2007) was a Serbian and Yugoslav singer, journalist and writer.

Prelević was widely known for his raspy voice, his transgressive public persona, and his trademark eyepatch (which he started wearing in mid-1990s, after he lost his right eye in a fight). During his musical career, Prelević released three solo albums and one album with the symphonic rock band Opus. He also made recordings with rock band Korni Grupa and jazz rock band Oliver. Prelević wrote articles and short stories for a number of Serbian and Yugoslav magazines and authored three books of short stories.

== Biography ==
=== Early life ===
Prelević was born in Belgrade on 11 November 1948. As young, he studied to become a clockmaker. In his early years, Prelević was interested in sports: he played in football clubs Bulburderac and Red Star Belgrade, and was a goalkeeper in the ice hockey club Partizan.

=== Musical career ===
Prelević started to perform in 1965, mostly soul and rhythm and blues standards, as a member of the bands Orkani (The Hurricanes), Juniori (The Juniors), Tomi Sovilj i Njegove Siluete and Vizije (The Visions).

In 1968, he became the vocalist for Korni Grupa, but spent only several months with the band, as he was excluded from Korni Grupa by the leader Kornelije Kovač due to negligence towards professional obligations. He recorded only one song with Korni Grupa, "Čovek i pas" ("A Man and a Dog"), which would later appear as the B-side of the single "Cigu-ligu" ("Tweedle-dum, Tweedle-dee"), recorded with the band's new vocalist Dalibor Brun.

In 1970, on the Belgrade Spring festival, Prelević performed the song "Da l' postoji ona koju sanjam" ("Does the Girl from My Dreams Exist"). During the same year, on the Youth Festival in Subotica he was awarded for the song "Kažu" ("They Say"), but he went on stage to receive the award intoxicated, which was the first in a series of scandals he made during his career. Due to the scandal, he was banned from all Radio Television Belgrade programs for a year, which he spent performing in clubs in the United States and in the mountain resort Garmisch-Partenkirchen in Germany.

In 1974, he joined the short-lasting jazz rock supergroup Oliver, which consisted of Prelević, Oliver Mandić, members of Pop Mašina, and other musicians from Belgrade. With the band, Prelević recorded the song "Tajna" ("A Secret"). During the same year, Prelević and the members of Korni Grupa, under the name Prele i Prijatelji (Prele and Friends), recorded the single "Vrati mi snove za dvoje" ("Return to Me Dreams for Two"). In 1975, he joined the reformed symphonic rock band Opus, with which he recorded their only studio album, Opus 1, released in 1975. In 1979, he appeared on the Belgrade Spring festival with the song "Gubitnik sam ja" ("I am a Loser"), written by Oliver Mandić. The song was released on the various artists album Beogradsko proleće 1979 (Belgrade Spring 1979). In 1980, he appeared on the Opatija festival with the song "Bela soba" ("White Room"), composed by Mandić and with lyrics written by Prelević himself. On the same festival, he performed the song "Ljubav naša umire" ("Our Love Is Dying") with jazz singer Nada Pavlović, the duet appearing on Nada Pavlović's 7-inch single. During the same year, he recorded the songs "Hiljaditi metar" ("The Thousandth Meter") and "Mi smo ponos druga Tita" ("We Are the Pride of Comrade Tito") for the album of youth work action songs O'ruk generacija (Heigh-Ho Generation). At the beginning of the 1980s, he performed in clubs in the Netherlands.

In 1982, he released his first solo album, entitled Na oštrici brijača (On the Razor's Edge). The songs featured on the album were written by Kire Mitrev, Bora Đorđević and Prelević himself. The album was recorded with keyboardist Laza Ristovski, guitarist Enes Mekić, drummer Vladimir "Furda" Furduj, bass guitarist Nenad Stefanović "Japanac", trumpeters Stjepko Gut and Georgi Dimitrovski, saxophonist Ivan Švager and trombonist Kire Mitrev. The title track featured the actor Slobodan Aligrudić as the narrator. The album featured a cover of Indexi song "Jutro će promeniti sve" ("The Morning Will Change Everything"). Prelević continued his cooperation with Mitrev by writing lyrics for the song "Žena od voska" ("Woman Made of Wax"), recorded by Mitrev's band KIM for their 1984 album Plaćena da voli (Paid to Love). On the 1986 MESAM festival, Prelević performed the song "Zbog takvih žena nastaju balade" ("That's the Sort of Woman Because of Which the Ballads Are Made").

In 1991, Prelević released his second solo album, U redu, pobedio sam (All Right, I Won), which featured songs from his first album and covers of jazz standards which he recorded with trumpeter Duško Gojković, pianist Miša Krstić, bassist Miša Blam and drummer Lala Kovač. During the same year, he appeared as guest vocalist on Revolveri album Šest i po tona bombona (Six and a Half Tons of Candy), in their cover of Bijelo Dugme's song "Ništa mudro" ("Nothing Smart"). His September 1991 concert in Filmski Grad and his March 1992 concert in Belgrade's Trade Union Hall featured Indexi as special guests. In 1994, for Goran Bregović's album La Reine Margot, which featured music Bregović had composed for the theatre play of the same name, Prelević sung the song "La Nuit", for which he also wrote the lyrics in an imaginary language resembling Romani. During the same year, he made a guest appearance in Vlada i Bajka song "Beograd" ("Belgrade"), released on their album Ja nisam ja (I Am not Me). The song also featured guest appearances by Bora Đorđević, Dragan Nikolić, Dragan Bjelogrlić and Nikola Kojo.

In 1996, Prelević released the album Ja, Prele (I, Prele). The album featured large number of musicians: Radomir Mihajlović Točak (of Smak), Dušan "Duda" Bezuha (of Zona B) and Dragan "Krle" Jovanović (of Generacija 5) on guitars, Saša Lokner (of Bajaga i Instruktori) on organ, Đorđe Petrović on keyboards, Nebojša Ignjatović on bass, Čedomir "Čeda" Macura (of Bajaga i Instruktori) on drums, Vlada i Bajka and Nikola Hadži Nikolić (of 357) on vocals. The album, among other songs, featured a new version of Korni Grupa's "Čovek i pas", a cover of Arsen Dedić song "O, mladosti" ("Oh, Youth"), a cover of Atomsko Sklonište song "Treba imat' dušu" ("One Must Have a Soul"), a Serbian language cover of Eric Clapton's song "Tears in Heaven", entitled "Kada budem na nebu" ("When I'm in Heaven"), a Serbian language cover of Rolling Stones' song "The Last Time", entitled "Neću da se predam" ("I Won't Give Up"), and a cover of Beatles' song "In My Life".

In 2002, the CD Santa Maria Della Salute was released, featuring actor Petar Kralj reciting the lyrics of Laza Kostić's poem "Santa Maria Della Salute" and Prelević singing the song composed on the poem lyrics.

=== Journalistic and literary career ===
Since the first half of the 1980s, Prelević wrote for the magazines Rock, Duga, NIN, RTV Revija and Književne novine. In 1998, Prelević started the magazine Probisvet (Landloper), but only one issue was published due to the NATO bombing of Yugoslavia.

In 1987, his first book of short stories, entitled Kako je umro Baš Ćelik (How Baš Čelik Died), was published. In 1991, he published his second book of short stories, Voz za jednu bitangu (A Train for a Rascal). With writer Milan Oklopčić and journalist Bogdan Tirnanić he coauthored the book of short stories Beogradske priče (Belgrade Stories, 1991). The book Poslednji krug u Monci (The Last Circle at Monza Circuit, 2006) featured the collection of his short stories originally published in magazines. He wrote the drama F odeljenje (Section F). He was the editor of the monography Njim samim (By Himself), which featured stories, poems and notes written by actor Zoran Radmilović.

Prelević was a member of the Association of Writers of Serbia.

In 2018, the book Ko želi da živi večno (Who Wants to Live Forever) was published, edited by Prelević's daughter Milica and featuring his articles originally published in RTV Revija and Kurir, his short stories originally published in Književne novine, and his science fiction stories originally published in Politikin Zabavnik.

=== Theatre, film and television ===
In 1969, Prelević was part of the cast in the Yugoslav production of Hair, which premiered on 20 March 1969, in Atelje 212 theatre. He wrote the screenplay for Aleksandar Bošković's 1989 film Poslednji krug u Monci (The Last Circle at Monza Circuit), in which he made a cameo appearance. He acted in Branko Baletić's TV series Kako (How) and in the omnibus film Package Arrangement.

=== Politics ===
Prelević was a member of the Democratic Party of Serbia. He was arrested during March 9, 1991 protest. He fought in the Croatian War.

=== Death ===
Prelević died in Belgrade after long illness, on 28 July 2007. He was 58 years old. He was cremated and his remains were buried at the Belgrade New Cemetery. His tombstone bears the inscription "So far so good".

== Legacy ==
A documentary about Prelević entitled U redu, pobedio sam (after his second studio album) was released in 2009. The film, directed by Vladimir Petrović, featured interviews with Prelević, actors Petar Božović and Dragan Nikolić, writers Momo Kapor and Brana Crnčević, journalist Bogdan Tirnanić, and others.

Prelević's song "Bela soba" was covered by Serbian band 357 on their 2002 album Iz gazda Žikine kuhinje (From Innkeeper Žika's Kitchen). The song "Majko, na šta liči tvoj sin" ("Mother, Look at the State Your Son Is In") was remixed in 2010 by the Serbian project Laura 2000 on their debut studio album ...pobiću se zadnji put da vidim da l' sam star (... I'll Have a One Last Fistfight Just to See if I'm Old), named after a verse from the song.

== Discography ==
=== With Korni Grupa ===
==== Singles ====
- "Čovek i pas" (B-side of "Cigu-ligu"; 1969)

=== With Opus ===
==== Studio albums ====
- Opus 1 (1975)

=== Solo ===
==== Studio albums ====
- Na oštrici brijača (1982)
- Ja, Prele (1996)

==== Compilation albums ====
- U redu, pobedio sam (1991)

=== Singles ===
- "Da l' postoji ona koju sanjam" / "Kažu" (1970)
- "Hej, hej, okreni se" / "Jesenja pesma" (1973)
- "Nisam više tvoj" / "U noćima bez sna" (1973)
- "Vrati mi snove za dvoje" / "Ne traži ljubav" (1974)
- "Mojih pet minuta" / "Povedi me" (1978)
- "Hoću da pamtiš" / "Hoću da pamtiš – Instrumental" (1980)

=== With Oliver ===
==== Singles ====
- "Tajna" / "Prošlo je sve" (1974)

=== Other appearances ===
- "Ljubav naša umire" (duet with Nada Pavlović, B-side of Nada Pavlović – "Brodvej", 1980)
- "Hiljaditi metar" / "Mi smo ponos druga Tita" (O'ruk generacija, 1980)
- "La Nuit" (Goran Bregović – La Reine Margot, 1994)
- "Beograd" (Vlada i Bajka – Ja nisam ja, 1994)
- "Santa Maria Della Salute" (Santa Maria Della Salute, 2002)

== Bibliography ==
- Kako je umro Baš Ćelik (1987)
- Voz za jednu bitangu (1991)
- Beogradske priče (With Milan Oklopčić and Bogdan Tirnanić, 1991)
- Poslednji krug u Monci (2006)
- Ko želi da živi večno (2018)
