= Put ka Suncu =

Live album by Pop Mašina
- Released: 1976
- Recorded: 2 January 1974, 4 January 1974, 29 November 1975
- Venue: Belgrade Sports Hall, Belgrade
- Genre: Progressive rock; hard rock; blues rock
- Label: ZKP RTLJ
- Producer: Robert Nemeček

Pop Mašina chronology
Na izvoru svetlosti (1975)	Put ka Suncu (1976)	Antologija 1972 – 1976 (2008)

Put ka Suncu (trans. Road to Sun) is the first and only live album by Yugoslav progressive rock band Pop Mašina, released in 1976. Put ka Suncu is the first solo live album by a Yugoslav rock act (as prior to this album only various artists live albums by Yugoslav rock acts were released). Put ka Suncu is the band's last album, as the group disbanded two years after releasing it.

== Recording ==
Due to their reputation of a band with attractive live performances, after the release of their second studio album Na izvoru svetlosti (At the Spring of Light) in 1975, Pop Mašina members decided to record a live album. In 1976, the band released Put ka Suncu, recorded on their performances in Belgrade Sports Hall, thus becoming the first Yugoslav band to release a solo live album (as prior to Put ka Suncu only various artists live albums—usually recorded on Yugoslav rock festivals—were released). The tracks on the album were recorded on three different Pop Mašina performances in Belgrade Sports Hall: "Tražim put" and "Negde daleko" were recorded on the performance held on 2 January 1974, "Sećam se" on the performance held on 4 January 1975, and the title track on the performance held on 29 November 1975.

== Track listing ==
Side A
No.	Title	Length
1.	"Tražim put" ("I'm Searching for a Road")	5:30
2.	"Sećam se" ("I Remember")	7:02
3.	"Negde daleko" ("Somewhere Far Away")	6:10

Side B
No.	Title	Length
1.	"Put ka Suncu" ("Road to Sun")	18:50

== Personnel ==
- Robert Nemeček - bass guitar, vocals, producer
- Zoran Božinović - guitar, vocals
- Mihajlo Popović - drums

=== Additional personnel ===
- Aca Radojčić - recording (tracks: A1, A3)
- Slobodan Đoršević - recording (track A2)
- Voja Antnonić - recording (track B1)
- Mitja Hadži-Vuković - recording, mixing, engineer (track B1)
- Milan Miletić - engineer (tracks: A1, A2, A3)
- Dragan Vukičević - mixing (tracks: A1, A2, A3)
- Tahir Durkalić - mixing (tracks: A1, A2, A3)
- Jugoslav Vlahović - design

== Reception and legacy ==
Due to technical limitations, the album did not see the expected critical success. However, in 2000, the song "Put ka Suncu" polled at 92nd on the Rock Express Top 100 Yugoslav Rock Songs of All Times list.
