= Pop Mašina =

Yugoslav band (1972–1978)

- The 1972–1976 Pop Mašina lineup, from left to right: Robert Nemeček, Zoran Božinović, and Mihajlo Popović

Background information
- Origin: Belgrade, SR Serbia, SFR Yugoslavia
- Genres: Progressive rock; hard rock; blues rock; psychedelic rock; acid rock; proto-metal
- Years active: 1972–1978
- Labels: PGP-RTB, ZKP RTLJ, ITMM, MCF, Internut Music, Multimedia
- Past members: Robert Nemeček; Svetozar Božinović; Ratislav Đelmaš; Sava Bojić; Mihajlo Popović; Oliver Mandić; Dragan Velikić; Vidoja Božinović; Dušan Petrović; Dušan Đukić; Miroslav Cvetković
- Website: popmasina.com

Pop Mašina (Serbian Cyrillic: Поп Машина; trans. Pop Machine) was a Yugoslav progressive rock band formed in Belgrade in 1972. The group blended hard rock sound with blues, psychedelic and acid rock elements and is considered one of the most prominent bands of the 1970s Yugoslav rock scene.

The band was formed by bass guitarist and vocalist Robert Nemeček, guitarist and vocalist Zoran Božinović, drummer Ratislav "Raša" Đelmaš and vocalist Sava Bojić. Đelmaš and Bojić left Pop Mašina soon after its formation, and the band continued as a trio with the drummer Mihajlo "Bata" Popović. The lineup featuring Nemeček, Zoran Božinović and Popović was the longest lasting, the most successful and the best-known Pop Mašina lineup. One of the first bands on the Yugoslav rock scene to move from jazz- and classical music-influenced progressive rock towards heavier rock sound, Pop Mašina managed to gain large popularity as a live act. The band released two studio albums and a live album—their debut Kiselina (Acid) today widely considered one of the most notable records in the history of Yugoslav rock music—before Nemeček left the band in 1976 for his mandatory army stint. Zoran Božinović continued to lead Pop Mašina, the new lineup featuring his brother Vidoja "Džindžer" Božinović on guitar. The new lineup of Pop Mašina saw little success, and the band officially disbanded in 1978. In 1980, Nemeček and the Božinović brothers formed the short-lasting hard rock and heavy metal band Rok Mašina (Rock Machine).

== Band history ==
=== 1972–1978 ===
The band was formed in Belgrade in 1972 by Robert Nemeček (a former member of the bands Dogovor iz 1804., Džentlmeni, and Intro, bass guitar and vocals), Zoran Božinović (a former member of Excellent, Rokeri, Džentlmeni, and Intro, guitar and vocals), Ratislav "Raša" Đelmaš (drums) and Sava Bojić (vocals). Very soon, Bojić left the band—in 1974 he would join the progressive rock band Tako— and soon after Đelmaš also left, joining YU Grupa. Đelmaš was replaced by a former Rokeri, Intro, and Siluete member Mihajlo "Bata" Popović, Pop Mašina continuing as a power trio.

Pop Mašina was one of the first bands on the Yugoslav rock scene to move from the late 1960s and early 1970s jazz- and classical music-influenced progressive rock towards heavier rock sound. They often held free concerts, and in 1972 they organized a free open-air concert at Hajdučka česma in Belgrade, which featured, alongside Pop Mašina, performances by S Vremena Na Vreme, Porodična Manufaktura Crnog Hleba and other bands. During the same year, the band released their debut record through PGP-RTB record label – a 7-inch single with the songs "Sjaj u očima" ("Glowing Eyes") and "Put ka Suncu" ("Road to Sun"), which had both already gained attention of the audience on their live performances, the recording of the latter featuring Porodična Manufaktura Crnog Hleba flutist Branimir Malkoč. Good reception of their debut single provided them with an opportunity to record new material. Their following 7-inch single, released in 1973, featured the songs "Promenićemo svet" ("We'll Change the World") and "Svemirska priča" ("Space Tale"), both inspired by hippie movement and featuring members of the Indian music band Ganeša Ljubomir Ristić (on sitar) and Bojan Kveder (on tabla). During the same year, on 25 May, which was celebrated as Youth Day in Yugoslavia, Pop Mašina organized another free concert at Hajdučka česma, which featured the bands Jutro, Grupa 220, Vlada i Bajka, Med and other acts.

In 1973, Pop Mašina released their debut album, Kiselina (Acid), through PGP-RTB. The album featured hard rock sound with psychedelic and acid rock elements, but also featured acoustic sections in the tracks like "Mir" ("Peace") and "Povratak zvezdama" ("Return to the Stars"). The album's main theme was a psychedelic experience; originally, the opening track should have been "Tražim put" ("I'm Searching for a Trip"), allegorically describing narrator's attempts to find a drug dealer. In a 2011 interview, Nemeček stated that he wrote the original lyrics for the album after some notes he made while being under the influence of LSD. However, the band realized the censors in the state-owned PGP-RTB might refuse to approve the release of the album and decided to cover up the album concept. They made changes to the songs and altered the original track listing. The original album cover, designed by cartoonist and graphic designer Jugoslav Vlahović, who was aware of the album concept, featured psychedelic artwork inspired by the psychedelic portraits of The Beatles. However, realizing that the artwork might reveal the album's theme to PGP-RTB censors and editors, band members and Vlahović decided to put a simple photograph of the band on the cover. Kiselina featured numerous guest musicians: Pop Mašina former member Raša Đelmaš on drums, a former Porodična Manufaktura Crnog Hleba member Branimir Malkoč on flute, Sloba Marković on keyboards, SOS member Miša Aleksić on bass guitar, and singer-songwriter Drago Mlinarec, S Vremena Na Vreme members Ljuba Ninković and Vojislav Đukić and the members of the trio DAG on backing vocals. Pop Mašina and S Vremena Na Vreme would continue to cooperate in studio and on live appearances, and in 1975 Nemeček would appear as a guest on S Vremena Na Vreme self-titled debut album. Despite Pop Mašina members' efforts to cover up the album theme, after its release a journalist for the Ilustrovana Politika magazine who spent some time in the United States revealed the true meaning of the album title to PGP-RTB editors.

After the release of Kiselina, the band held a large number of concerts across Yugoslavia. They had numerous performances in Belgrade Sports Hall. These concerts were organized with the help of Aleksandar Tijanić, at the time a journalism student, and other Yugoslav progressive rock bands were often invited to perform. Pop Mašina had an attractive on-stage appearance: Božinović was one of the first Yugoslav guitarists that played long guitar solos and used to play guitar with a bow and behind his back. On one of these concerts Nemeček smashed his bass guitar and threw it into the audience; it was caught by young musician Miroslav Cvetković, who fixed it and later used it on live performances. Cvetković would later himself become a member of Pop Mašina.

At the beginning of 1975, in Akademik Studio in Ljubljana, the band recorded their second studio album, Na izvoru svetlosti (At the Spring of Light). The album was produced by Ivo Umek and Nemeček. It featured Ljuba Ninković and Sloba Marković as guest musicians. The album featured one live track, the blues song "Negde daleko" ("Somewhere Far Away"), recorded on the band's concert held in Belgrade Sports Hall on 2 January 1974. The song "Rekvijem za prijatelja" ("Requiem for a Friend"), with lyrics written by Ljuba Ninković, was dedicated to Predrag Jovičić, the vocalist of the band San, who earlier that year died from an electric shock on a concert in Čair Sports Center in Niš. The song was musically inspired by Johann Sebastian Bach's choral composition and featured a string quartet. The album also featured a new version of the song "Zemlja svetlosti" ("Land of Light"), previously released on a 7-inch single. After the album release, the band was joined by the keyboardist Oliver Mandić. However, he left the band after only several performances, later gaining fame as a solo artist. He was replaced by former Moira member Dragan Velikić, whose stint with the band was also short, from May 1975 until the beginning of 1976.

Due to their reputation of a band with attractive live performances, Pop Mašina members decided to record a live album. In 1976, the band released the live album Put ka Suncu, recorded on three different performances in Belgrade Sports Hall, thus becoming the first Yugoslav band to release a solo live album (as prior to Put ka Suncu only various artists live albums—usually recorded on Yugoslav rock festivals—were released). However, due to technical limitations, the album did not see the expected critical success. The A-side of the album featured the tracks "Tražim put", "In memoriam (Sećam se)" ("In Memoriam (I Remember)") and "Negde daleko", while the B-side featured the 19-minute version of "Put ka Suncu".

At the end of 1976, Nemeček left the band to serve his mandatory stint in the Yugoslav army, Mihajlović leaving the band soon after. Zoran Božinović was joined by his brother, guitarist Vidoja "Džindžer" Božinović (a former Dim Bez Vatre member), bass guitarist Dušan "Duda" Petrović and drummer Dušan "Đuka" Đukić (a former Innamorata member). The new Pop Mašina lineup started experimenting with jazz rock sound, but soon turned to conventional hard rock. After Nemeček returned from the army, he did not rejoin Pop Mašina; he moved to London, where he started working in the music instruments company Toma & Co.

The new Pop Mašina lineup performed, alongside Zdravo, Zlatni Prsti, Drugi Način, Parni Valjak, Time and other bands, on a concert in Belgrade's Pinki Hall, the recordings of their songs "Sećanja" ("Memories") and "Moja pesma" ("My Song") appearing on the various artists live album Pop Parada 1 (Pop Parade 1) recorded on the concert. In 1977, Petrović left the band, joining the newly-formed Generacija 5, and was replaced by Miroslav "Cvele" Cvetković (a former Tilt member). This lineup announced the recording of a new album, but recorded only one 7-inch single, with the songs "Moja pesma" and "Uspomena" ("Memory"), before disbanding in 1978.

=== Post-breakup, Rok Mašina and post-Rok Mašina ===
After the last lineup of Pop Mašina disbanded, Vidoja Božinović and Dušan Đukić joined the band Dah. After Dah disbanded in 1979, Božinović joined the band Opus, in which he spent only six months. After he returned from London, Nemeček worked in Dadov Theatre as an editor of the theatre's rock concerts program. In 1980, Nemeček, Božinović brothers and drummer Vladan Dokić formed the hard rock and heavy metal band Rok Mašina, which released only one self-title album before disbanding in 1982. Part of the material they recorded for their second album was released in 1983 on the mini album Izrod na granici (Bastard on the Border).

After Rok Mašina disbanded, Zoran Božinović retired from music. In the 1990s, he returned to performing, playing with the blues rock band Zona B. He died on 12 July 2004. Vidoja Božinovič dedicated himself to his studies of architecture, performed in blues clubs and with the jazz band Interactive, before joining the highly successful Riblja Čorba in 1984. Nemeček retired from music, becoming the London correspondent for Yugoslav magazines RTV revija (Radio and Television Revue) and YU video. Later he became the film program editor at RTV Politika. In the 1990s he became the editor of film program on Television Pink, later moving to Radio Television of Serbia, and eventually to TV Avala.

The band's forming member Ratislav "Raša" Đelmaš gained nationwide success with YU Grupa, and from 1976 to 1979 led the band Zebra. He died in Belgrade on 28 October 2021. The band's former drummer Mihajlo "Bata" Popović finished his studies of architecture and moved to the United States in 1979. In the United States he worked as an architect, receiving several awards for his projects, and performed occasionally only. In 2009, he moved back to his native Montenegro, to Sutomore. He died on 31 August 2021. The band's former keyboardist Dragan Velikić made a successful career as a writer, receiving the prominent NIN Award twice. From 2005 to 2009, he was the Serbian ambassador to Austria. The band's former bass guitarist Dušan Petrović died on 17 October 2003.

In 1994, a remastered version of Kiselina was released on CD by Serbian record label ITVMM. The release featured the songs "Put ka Suncu" and "Sjaj u očima", originally released on Pop Mašina's first 7-inch single, as bonus track. In 2000, Kiselina was reissued on CD by Polish record label Wydawnictwo 21, in a limited number of 500 copies and featuring songs from the groups first and second 7-inch single as bonus tracks. In 2005, the album was reissued on vinyl by Austrian record label Atlantide. The same record label reissued Na izvoru svetlosti on vinyl in 2008.

In 2007, to celebrate 35 years since the release of Kiselina, Nemeček, in cooperation with Serbian label MCG records, released the CD Originalna Kiselina – 35 godina kasnije (Original Acid – 35 Years Later) in a limited number of 999 copies. The release featured original Kiselina track listing and new song mixes. Part of the originally planned but unrecorded instrumental sessions was recorded by Nemeček's son Jan Nemeček and added to original recordings. In 2008, Internut Music and Multimedia Records released the box set Antologija 1972 – 1976 (Anthology 1972–1976), which featured all the recordings released by Pop Mašina, 9 unreleased tracks, a recording of a concert in Belgrade Sports Hall, and a book about the band. In 2017, Multimedia Music released the compilation album Na drumu za haos 1972 – 2017, and in 2022, Croatia Records reissued Kiselina on vinyl.

Robert Nemeček died in Belgrade on 8 January 2024.

== Legacy ==
Pop Mašina song "Zemlja svetlosti" was covered by Serbian and Yugoslav alternative rock band Disciplina Kičme on their 1991 album Nova iznenađenja za nova pokolenja (New Surprises for New Generations). The song "Sećanja" ("Memories") was covered by Serbian and Yugoslav singer-songwriter Nikola Čuturilo on his 2011 album Tu i sad (Here and Now), Vidoja Božinović making a guest appearance on the track. Songs "Negde daleko" and "Put na suncu" were covered in 2019 by Serbian blues rock band Texas Flood on their cover album Tražim ljude kao ja (I'm Looking for the People like Me).

The album Kiselina was polled in 1998 as 60th on the list of 100 greatest Yugoslav popular music albums in the book YU 100: najbolji albumi jugoslovenske rok i pop muzike (YU 100: The Best albums of Yugoslav pop and rock music). The song "Put ka Suncu" was polled in 2000 as 92nd on Rock Express Top 100 Yugoslav Rock Songs of All Times list.

On 5 October 2005, in Belgrade's Bard Club, a concert dedicated to Zoran Božinović was held. The musicians performing on the concert included his brother Vidoja, Miroslav Cvetković (of Bajaga i Instruktori, formerly of Pop Mašina), Nebojša Antonijević (of Partibrejkers), Dejan Cukić, Petar Radmilović (of Đorđe Balašević's backing band), Dušan Kojić (of Disciplina Kičme), Branislav Petrović (of Električni Orgazam), Dušan Đukić (formerly of Pop Mašina), Nikola Čuturilo, Manja Đorđević (of Disciplina Kičme), Vladimir Đorđević (of Lira Vega and Sila), Vlada Negovanović, the bands Van Gogh and Zona B, and others. The recording of the concert was released on the DVD Put ka Suncu – Noć posvećena Zoranu Božinoviću (Road to Sun – A Night Dedicated to Zoran Božinović).

== Band members ==
- Robert Nemeček – bass guitar, vocals (1972–1976)
- Zoran Božinović – guitar, vocals (1972–1978)
- Ratislav "Raša" Đelmaš – drums (1972)
- Sava Bojić – guitar, vocals (1972)
- Mihajlo "Bata" Popović – drums, percussion (1972–1976)
- Oliver Mandić – keyboards, vocals (1975)
- Dragan Velikić – keyboards (1975–1976)
- Dušan "Duda" Petrović – bass guitar (1976–1977)
- Dušan "Đuka" Đukić – drums (1976–1978)
- Vidoja "Džindžer" Božinović – guitar (1976–1978)
- Miroslav "Cvele" Cvetković – bass guitar, vocals (1977–1978)

== Discography ==
=== Studio albums ===
- Kiselina (1973)
- Na izvoru svetlosti (1975)

=== Live albums ===
- Put ka Suncu (1976)

=== Box sets ===
- Antologija 1972 – 1976 (2008)

=== Compilations ===
- Na drumu za haos 1972 – 2017 (2017)

=== Singles ===
- "Put ka Suncu" / "Sjaj u očima" (1972)
- "Promenićemo svet" / "Svemirska priča" (1973)
- "Zemlja svetlosti" / "Dugo lutanje kroz noć" (1974)
- "Sećanja" / "Rekvijem za prijatelja" (1975)
- "Moja pesma" / "Uspomena" (1977)

=== Other appearances ===
- "Sećanje" / "Moja pesma" (Pop Parada 1, 1977)

== See also ==
- Rok Mašina
