= Tako (band) =

Yugoslav progressive rock band

- The 1977–1981 Tako lineup, from left to right: Dušan Ćućuz, Slobodan Felekatović, Đorđe Ilijin, and Miroslav Dukić.

Background information
- Origin: Belgrade, SR Serbia, SFR Yugoslavia
- Genres: Progressive rock; symphonic rock; jazz rock
- Years active: 1975–1981
- Labels: ZKP RTLJ, PGP-RTB, Kalemegdan Disk, Rocksymphony
- Past members: Dušan Ćućuz; Đorđe Ilijin; Sava Bojić; Milan Lolić; Sava Jojić; Miroslav Dukić; Slobodan Felekatović

Tako (Serbian Cyrillic: Тако, trans. That Way) was a Yugoslav progressive rock band formed in Belgrade in 1975. They were one of the most prominent acts of the Yugoslav progressive rock scene.

The band was formed by bass guitarist Dušan Ćućuz, keyboardist Đorđe Ilijin, guitarist and vocalist Sava Bojić and drummer Milan Lolić, Bojić being replaced in 1976 by Sava Jojić. In 1977, Jojić and Lolić were replaced by Miroslav Dukić and Slobodan Felekatović respectively. After the lineup change, the band gained large media attention and released their debut self-titled album in 1978. In 1980 the band released their second album, disbanding soon after.

== History ==
=== 1975–1981 ===
Tako was formed in 1975 by Dušan "Dule" Ćućuz (bass guitar), Đorđe Ilijin (keyboards), Sava Bojić (guitar, vocals) and Milan "Mića Žorž" Lolić (drums). Ćućuz was previously a member of the bands Vihori (The Winds), Džentlmeni and Plamenih 6, he was one of the original Opus members and in the first half of the 1970s he worked as sound engineer for YU Grupa. Sava Bojić was one of the original Pop Mašina members, and Đorđe Ilijin previously performed with the band Sećanja (The Memories), worked as a music teacher and often appeared as guest musician on albums by other groups, playing keyboards, flute and harmonica. The band members chose the simple name Tako in accordance with their desire to create music without making compromises.

The band had their first live performance in the autumn of 1975, on a charity concert held in Belgrade's Pionir Hall, with funds raised dedicated to people suffering from muscular dystrophy. Initially, beside their own songs, the band performed Jimi Hendrix Experience and Santana covers. During 1975, they made their first demos, recording the songs "Čujem svoje misli" ("I Hear My Thoughts"), "Daždevnjak" ("Salamander"), "Lena" and "Čudan grad" ("Strange Town") in Radio Belgrade studios. After the recording sessions, Bojić had to leave the band due to his mandatory stint in the Yugoslav army, and was replaced by guitarist Sava Jojić. The group spent the summer of 1976 performing in International Student Center in Dubrovnik. Despite frequent live performances, the band had difficulties in reaching through to larger audience due to their non-commercial sound.

In 1977, Lolić was excluded from the band because of frequent alcohol abuse, and was replaced by Slobodan Felekatović, and Jojić was replaced by guitarist and vocalist Miroslav Dukić, a former member of the band Koren (Root). This lineup of the band managed to reach broad audience. During 1977, Tako played as an opening band on Bijelo Dugme tour, which brought them nationwide media attention, performing also on Bijelo Dugme's famous Hajdučka česma concert. In November 1977, Tako and progressive/acoustic rock band S Vremena Na Vreme organized a quadraphonic sound concert in Belgrade Youth Center. Tako also had successful appearances at the 1977 and 1978 editions of the BOOM Festival in Novi Sad.

Despite the interest for the band's work shown by the audience and the Yugoslav music press, Tako were refused as non-commercial by several major Yugoslav record labels. After their performance at the Subotica Youth Festival, they got a contract offer from Ljubljana-based ZKP RTLJ. In 1978, the band released their eponymous debut album for the label. The material on the album was authored by Ilijin, Ćućuz and Dukić and recorded in only 36 hours. The album featured symphonic rock-oriented sound with elements of jazz. The song "Lena" featured S Vremena Na Vreme member Asim Sarvan on vocals, and the song "Minijatura" ("Miniature") was composed as a tribute to the band Jethro Tull. The band promoted the album with a free concert held at Belgrade's Kalemegdan. At the beginning of 1979, after another quadraphonic sound concert organized with S Vremena Na Vreme, Tako went on hiatus because Ilijin got arthritis. Dukić used this time to form his own band.

Six months later, the band continued their activity. Their second album, U vreći za spavanje (In a Sleeping Bag), was released in September 1980 through Belgrade-based PGP-RTB. The album was produced by band members themselves, with every song on the album being produced by the member who wrote it. The band went on a promotional tour, however, due to the departure of Slobodan Felekatović, who had to leave the band because of his mandatory army stint, and due to the rising popularity of Yugoslav new wave bands, Tako decided to end their activity. They held their farewell concert at the Belgrade Faculty of Philosophy in March 1981.

=== Post breakup ===
After the disbandment, Dukić became a studio musician. In 2010, under the name D Mirro, he rerecorded nine Tako songs, releasing them on the album Tako Reloaded.

Ilijin dedicated himself to music education and ethnology. In 1983, he released the solo album Zabranjeno prisluškivanje (No Eavesdropping) on which he sang and played all the instruments except drums, which were played by Vladimir "Furda" Furduj, a former Elipse and Korni Grupa member. Several of the album songs featured Sremska Mitrovica Youth Center female choir. In the late 1980s, Ilijin produced the albums No. 1 by Mladen Vojičić Tifa and Uspavanka za Radmilu T. by Bijeli Bagremi. In 1989, he moved to New York, where he performed with several bands and worked as an accompanist in a ballet school in Harlem. During the following decades, he composed music for theatre and film. He wrote music for the feature films The Class: From Actor to Icon (2008) by Paula Panzarella, Pussyfoot (2008) by Dušan Sekulović and Truth Be Told (2012) by Gregorio Smith. After his return to Serbia, he released some of his compositions for film and theatre on the 2020 album Flying in the Dream.

After Tako disbanded, Ćućuz worked as a sound engineer for hard rock bands Riblja Čorba, Divlje Jagode and Kerber. He died on 20 October 2022.

Slobodan Felekatović performed with Petty Lucy Band. He died in 2018.

In 1993, German record label Kalemegdan Disk reissued both Tako albums on vinyl. Both albums featured new luxurious covers designed by Hungarian painter István Fujkin. Tako reissue featured "Put na jug" ("Journey to the South") as bonus track, and U vreći za spavanje reissue featured "Izgubljeno ništa" ("Lost Nothing") and "Horde mira" ("Hordes of Peace") as bonus. All of these tracks were recorded during the 1975–1981 period, but were previously unreleased. In 1996, the same record label reissued Ilijin's solo album Zabranjeno prisluškivanje. In 1998, Brazilian record label Rocksymphony reissued both Tako and U vreći za spavanje on compact disc, and in 2002, Italian record label Mellow Records reissued Zabranjeno prisluškivanje.

== Legacy ==
In 2014, Serbian alternative rock band Bjesovi covered Tako song "Probudi se" ("Wake Up") on their cover album Svetla svetlosti (Lights of Light).

== Band members ==
- Dušan Ćućuz – bass guitar, vocals (1975–1981)
- Đorđe Ilijin – keyboards, harmonica, flute, harp, vocals (1975–1981)
- Sava Bojić – guitar, vocals (1975–1976)
- Sava Jojić – guitar (1976)
- Milan Lolić – drums (1975–1977)
- Miroslav Dukić – guitar, vocals (1977–1981)
- Slobodan Felekatović – drums (1977–1981)

== Discography ==
=== Studio albums ===
- Tako (1978)
- U vreći za spavanje (1980)
