= Pussyfoot (disambiguation) =

Pussyfoot is a 1970s British recording act.

Pussyfoot may also refer to:

- Pussyfoot (film), 2008 comedy
- Pussyfoot 5, British comic series
- The Age of the Pussyfoot, 1966 science fiction novel by Frederick Pohl
- Marc Antony and Pussyfoot, Warner Brothers cartoon characters
- (No Pussyfooting), 1973 studio album by Fripp & Eno
- William E. Johnson (prohibitionist) (1862-1945), American prohibitionist and The Pussyfoot, the non-alcoholic drink named after him
- "The Flying Pussyfoot", a transcontinental train featured in the Japanese series Baccano!
- Pussyfoot, a fictional character played by Harry Scott of the British comedy duo Scott and Whaley
- Pussyfoot Records (1994-2002), a Howie B record label
