= Rok Mašina (album) =

Studio album by Rok Mašina
- Released: 1981
- Recorded: June 1981
- Studio: Studio MS, Belgrade
- Genre: Hard rock; heavy metal
- Length: 32:45
- Label: Jugodisk
- Producer: Robert Nemeček

Rok Mašina chronology
Rok Mašina (1981)	Izrod na granici (1983)

Rok Mašina (trans. Rock Machine) is the 1981 debut and the only full-length studio album from Yugoslav hard rock and heavy metal band Rok Mašina.

== Background ==
Rok Mašina was formed in 1980 by former Pop Mašina members Robert Nemeček (vocals and bass guitar) and brothers Zoran and Vidoja Božinović (guitars), with Vladan Dokić (drums). With Rok Mašina, Nemeček and the Božinović brothers turned towards heavier, less complex sound than Pop Mašina's progressive/hard rock sound with blues, psychedelic and acid rock elements. The band's debut album was recorded during June 1981 in Studio MS in Belgrade. Part of the album lyrics were written by Dragana Stanaćev and Koviljka Milić, actresses of the Teatar Levo (Left Theatre) theatre, and the album featured Ljuba Ninković (formerly of S Vremena Na Vreme) and Dragan Popović (formerly of DAG) on backing vocals. The album was produced by Nemeček. It featured new versions of the songs "Vatra" and "Bilo mi je bolje", released a year earlier on a 7-inch single. After the album release, Dragan Đorđević, a former member of Generacija 5, replaced Dokić. However, as at the time of the great popularity of new wave bands in Yugoslavia the future for the band did not seem very promising, they disbanded in 1982, in the midst of recording their second studio album. Part of the material recorded for the second album would be released in 1983 on the mini-album Izrod na granici.

== Track listing ==
No.	Title	Lyrics	Music	Length
1.	"Neću ti dati" ("I Won't Allow You")	Dragana Stanaćev	Robert Nemeček; Vidoja Božinović; Zoran Božinović	3:25
2.	"Zakon ulice" ("Law of the Street")	Koviljka Milić; Robert Nemeček	Vidoja Božinović	3:13
3.	"Bilo mi je bolje" ("I Felt Better")	Robert Nemeček	Zoran Božinović	3:28
4.	"Želim" ("I Wish")	Robert Nemeček	Robert Nemeček	5:37
5.	"Rok mašina" ("Rock Machine")	Robert Nemeček	Zoran Božinović	4:13
6.	"Nešto strašno" ("Something Scary")	Koviljka Milić; Robert Nemeček	Zoran Božinović	3:49
7.	"Vatra" ("Fire")	Robert Nemeček	Vidoja Božinović	3:16
8.	"Sami i bez suza" ("Alone and Without Tears")	Robert Nemček	Zoran Božinović	5:24

== Personnel ==
- Robert Nemeček - bass guitar, vocals, production
- Zoran Božinović - guitar
- Vidoja Božinović - guitar
- Vladan Dokić - drums

=== Additional personnel ===
- Ljuba Ninković - backing vocals
- Dragan Popović - backing vocals
- Rade Ercegovac - engineer
- Slavko Timotijević - photography
- Jugoslav Vlahović - cover design
