= Kiselina =

Studio album by Pop Mašina
- Released: 1973
- Recorded: Studio X PGP-RTB, Belgrade; September 19–30, 1973
- Genre: Progressive rock; hard rock; psychedelic rock; acid rock
- Label: PGP-RTB
- Producer: Pop Mašina

Pop Mašina chronology
Kiselina (1973)	Na izvoru svetlosti (1975)

2000 reissue cover

2007 reissue cover

Professional ratings
Review scores
Source	Rating
Popboks (2007 reissue review)	10/10 stars

Kiselina (trans. Acid) is the 1973 debut album by Yugoslav progressive rock band Pop Mašina.

The album was polled in 1998 as the 60th on the list of 100 Greatest Yugoslav Rock and Pop Albums in the book YU 100: najbolji albumi jugoslovenske rok i pop muzike (YU 100: The Best Albums of Yugoslav Rock and Pop Music).

== Background, concept and recording ==
Formed in 1972 in Belgrade, Pop Mašina was one of the first Yugoslav bands to move the 1960s rhythm and blues towards a heavier rock sound. The band gained largeopularity with their live performances, which gave the members of the band, Robert Nemeček (bass guitar, vocals), Zoran Božinović (guitar, vocals) and Mihajlo "Bata" Popović (drums), an opportunity to record and release their debut album through the state-owned PGP-RTB record label. Kiselina was recorded from September 19 to 30, 1973 in PGP-RTB's Studio X and produced by band themselves. The album was recorded in only 20 hours. The recording featured numerous guest musicians: former Pop Mašina member Ratislav "Raša" Đelmaš on drums, a former Porodična Manufaktura Crnog Hleba member Branimir Malkoč on flute, Sloba Marković on keyboards, SOS member Miša Aleksić on bass guitar, and singer-songwriter Drago Mlinarec, S Vremena Na Vreme members Ljuba Ninković and Vojislav Đukić and the members of the trio DAG on backing vocals. Pop Mašina and S Vremena Na Vreme would continue to cooperate in studio and on live appearances: in 1975 Nemeček would appear as a guest on S Vremena Na Vreme self-titled debut album and Ljuba Ninković would once again appear as a guest on a Pop Mašina album, on Na izvoru svetlosti (At the Spring of Light).

Kiselina featured a hard rock sound with psychedelic and acid rock elements, but also featured acoustic sections in tracks like "Mir" ("Peace") and "Povratak zvezdama" ("Return to the Stars"). The album's main theme was a psychedelic experience; originally, the opening track should have been "Tražim put" ("I'm Searching for a Road"), allegorically describing narrator's attempts to find a drug dealer. In a 2011 interview, Nemeček stated that he wrote the original lyrics for the album after some notes he made while being under the influence of LSD. However, the band realized PGP-RTB censors might refuse to approve the release of the album and decided to cover up the album concept. They made numerous changes to the songs and altered the original track listing. The original album cover, designed by cartoonist and graphic designer Jugoslav Vlahović, who was aware of the album concept, featured psychedelic artwork inspired by the psychedelic portraits of The Beatles. However, upon realizing that the artwork might reveal the album's theme to PGP-RTB censors and editors, both band and Vlahović decided to use a simple band photograph on the cover instead. The photograph was made only several days before printing of the cover and the album release. Despite the band's efforts to cover up the album theme, after its release a journalist for the Ilustrovana Politika magazine who spent some time in the United States revealed the true meaning of the album title to the PGP-RTB editors.

== Track listing ==
Side A
No.	Title	Writer(s)	Length
1.	"Na drumu za haos" ("On the Road to Chaos")	Zoran Božinović	4:09
2.	"Pesma srećne noći" ("Song of a Joyful Night")	Robert Nemeček	4:25
3.	"Mir" ("Peace")	Zoran Božinović	3:02
4.	"Kiselina" ("Acid")	Zoran Božinović	5:23

Side B
No.	Title	Author	Length
1.	"Tražim put" ("I'm Looking for a Trip")	Zoran Božinović	3:25
2.	"Povratak zvezdama" ("Return to the Stars")	Zoran Božinović	4:29
3.	"Svemirska priča" ("Space Tale")	Robert Nemeček	1:40
4.	"Slika iz prošlih dana" ("Images of Yesterdays")	Robert Nemeček	4:27
5.	"Jark" ("Dne Eht")	Robert Nemeček	1:41

== Personnel ==
- Robert Nemeček – bass guitar, vocals, acoustic guitar
- Zoran Božinović – guitar, vocals
- Mihajlo Popović – drums, congas

=== Additional personnel ===
- Sloba Marković – organ (on "Pesma srećne noći"), electric piano (on "Kiselina" and "Povratak zvezdama")
- Miša Aleksić – bass guitar (on "Povratak zvezdama" and "Slika iz prošlih dana")
- Raša Đelmaš – drums (on "Sjaj u očima")
- Branimir Malkoč – flute
- Drago Mlinarec – backing vocals (on "Na putu za haos")
- Ljuba Ninković – backing vocals (on "Na putu za haos")
- Vojislav Đukić – backing vocals (on "Na putu za haos")
- DAG – backing vocals (on "Na putu za haos")
  - Dragan Popović
  - Grujica Milanović
  - Aleksandar Milanović
- Slobodan Petrović – engineer
- Jugoslav Vlahović – album cover

== Reissues ==
In 1994, a remastered version of Kiselina was released on CD by Serbian record label ITVMM. The release featured the songs "Put ka Suncu" and "Sjaj u očima" ("Glowing Eyes"), originally released on Pop Mašina's first 7-inch single, as bonus track. In 2000, the album was reissued on CD by Polish record label Wydawnictwo 21, in a limited number of 500 copies and featuring the songs from the band's first and second 7-inch single as bonus tracks. In 2005, the album was reissued on vinyl by Austrian record label Atlantide. In 2022, Croatian record label Croatia Records reissued Kiselina on vinyl.

In 2007, to celebrate 35 years since the release of the album, Nemeček, in cooperation with Serbian label MCG records, released the CD Originalna Kiselina – 35 godina kasnije (Original Acid – 35 Years Later) in a limited number of 999 copies. The release featured original track listing and different song mixes. Part of the originally planned but unrecorded instrumental sessions was recorded by Nemeček's son Jan Nemeček and added to original recordings. Nemeček stated that the release "is not a reissue of Kiselina. It is basically what Kiselina should have looked like."

=== Originalna Kiselina – 35 godina kasnije track listing ===
Originalna Kiselina – 35 godina kasnije
No.	Title	Length
1.	"Tražim put"	3:25
2.	"Kiselina"	5:23
3.	"Pesma srećne noći"	4:25
4.	"Na drumu za haos"	4:09
5.	"Sjaj u očima" ("Glowing Eyes")	3:11
6.	"Jark/Kraj" ("Dne Eth/The End")	1:40
7.	"Povratak zvezdama"	4:29
8.	"Mir"	3:02
9.	"Slika iz prošlih dana"	4:27

== Legacy ==
The album was polled in 1998 as the 60th on the list of 100 Greatest Yugoslav Rock and Pop Albums in the book YU 100: najbolji albumi jugoslovenske rok i pop muzike (YU 100: The Best Albums of Yugoslav Rock and Pop Music).

Serbian film critic Dimitrije Vojnov named Kiselina one of ten most important albums in the history of Yugoslav rock music, stating that "Pop Mašina is a band you can always name when talking how Yugoslav rock before Yugoslav new wave wasn't negligible". He also stated that "Kiselina was the beginning of a genre that was never groomed as it should have been here [in Yugoslavia]". Serbian critic Nenad Pejović called Kiselina a "pivot album in the history of Serbian rock", stating that "even today Kiselina can be an example of a modern rock album".
