= Duško Gojković =

Serbian and Yugoslav jazz trumpeter (1931–2023)

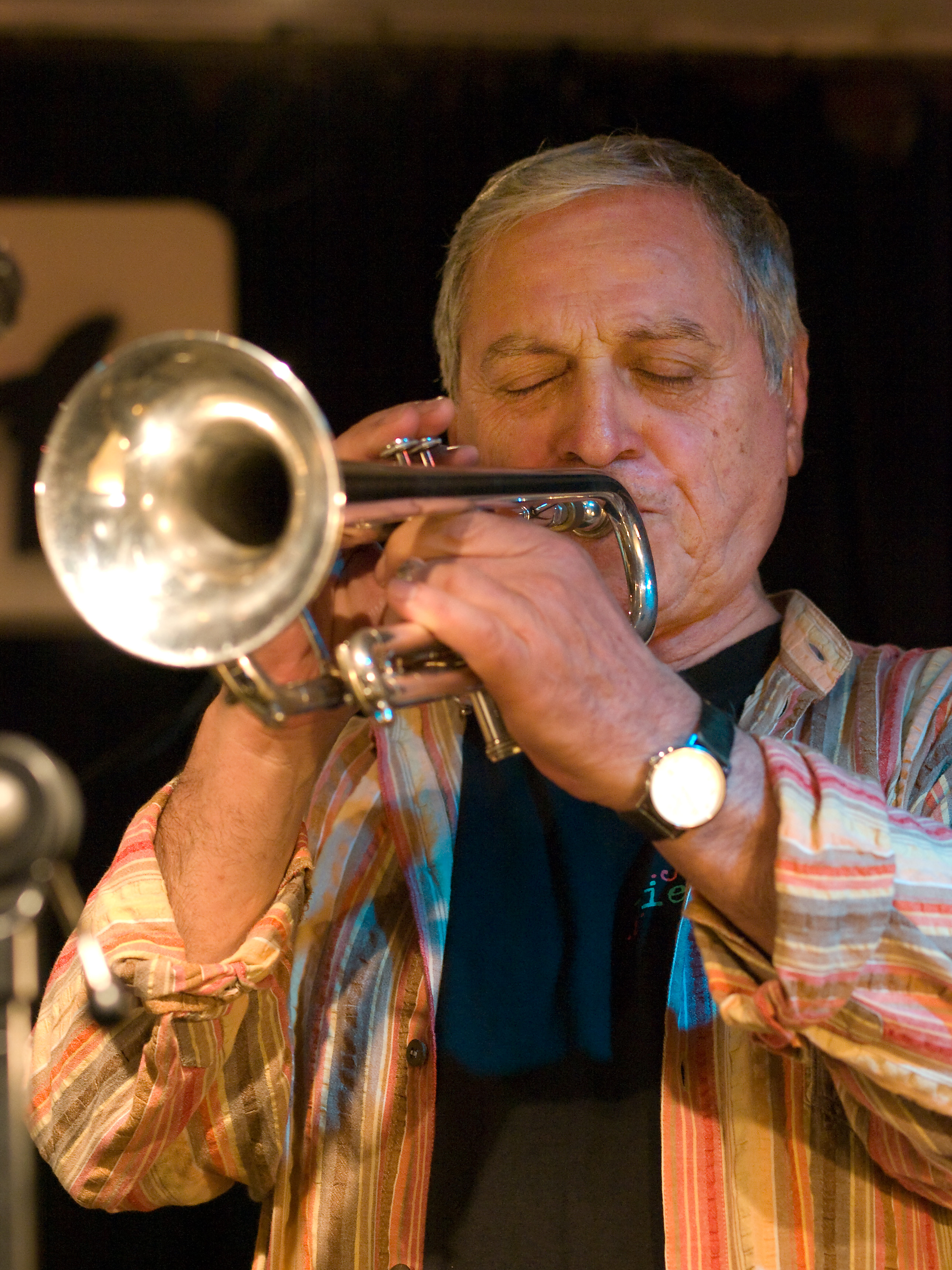
- Gojković in 2009

Background information
- Born: 14 October 1931; Jajce, Yugoslavia (now Bosnia and Herzegovina)
- Died: 5 April 2023 (aged 91) Munich, Germany
- Genres: Jazz
- Occupation: Musician
- Instrument: Trumpet
- Years active: 1950s–2023
- Website: duskogojkovic.com

Duško Gojković (Serbian Cyrillic: Душко Гојковић, romanized: Dusko Goykovich; 14 October 1931 – 5 April 2023) was a Serbian jazz trumpeter, composer, and arranger.

== Biography ==
Gojković was born on 14 October 1931, in Jajce, Bosnia and Herzegovina, at the time part of Kingdom of Yugoslavia. He studied at the Belgrade Music Academy from 1948 to 1953. He played trumpet in dixieland bands and joined the big band of Radio Belgrade when he was eighteen. He moved to West Germany and first recorded as a member of the Frankfurt Allstars in 1956. He spent the next four years as a member of Kurt Edelhagen's orchestra.

In these years, Gojković played with Chet Baker, Stan Getz, and Oscar Pettiford. In 1958, he performed at Newport Jazz Festival and drew attention on both sides of the Atlantic Ocean. In 1961, Gojkovic received a scholarship to attend Berklee College of Music, where he studied with Herb Pomeroy.

In 1966, Gojković recorded in Cologne his album Swinging Macedonia, produced by Eckart Rahn. The album contained original compositions inspired by the music of the Balkans. In the following years, he performed with Miles Davis, Dizzy Gillespie, Gerry Mulligan, Sonny Rollins, Duke Jordan, and Slide Hampton. He worked with the Kenny Clarke/Francy Boland Big Band from 1968–1973.

In 1986, Gojković formed another orchestra. His next albums were Soul Connection (1994), Bebop City, Balkan Blue (1997), In My Dreams (2001), Samba do Mar (2003), and Samba Tzigane (2006). In 2004, he performed on the 200th anniversary of Serbian statehood. For the occasion he performed with an all-star big band. Two years later, Gojković celebrated his 75th birthday with a grand concert in Belgrade, the capital of the Republic of Serbia.

The Brandenburg Concert – Dusko Goykovich With Strings came in 2013, showcasing Gojković performing live at Germany's Brandenburger Theatre, backed by the Brandenburg Orchestra. The same year, and recorded and titled to Duško Gojković & Big Band RTS featuring Martin Gjakonovski, Latin Haze, was released by PGP RTS in Serbia in 2014, while a year later it was issued in Germany on Enja with different cover and one track missing.

Gojković died in Munich on April 5, 2023, at the age of 91.

== Discography ==
=== As leader ===
- Swinging Macedonia (Philips (Germany), 1966; reissued on CD by Enja)
- Live at Domicile Munich (Session)/As Simple as It Is (MPS/BASF, 1970; issued by MPS, 1971)
- After Hours (Enja, 1971)
- It's About Blues Time (Ensayo, 1971; issued 1972)
- Ten to Two Blues (Ensayo, 1971)
- Slavic Mood (RCA, 1974)
- East of Montenegro (RCA, 1975; CD issue by Cosmic Sounds)
- Wunderhorn (Selected Sound, 1977)
- Trumpets & Rhythm Unit (RTB, 1979; CD reissue by Cosmic Sounds)
- Blues in the Gutter (Diskoton, 1983; CD reissue by Cosmic Sounds)
- A Day in Holland (Nilva, 1983)
- Adio-Easy Listening Music (PGP RTB, 1983)
- Snap Shot (Diskoton, 1983; CD reissue by Cosmic Sounds)
- Celebration (DIW, 1987)
- Balkan Blue (Enja, 1992; released 1997)
- Soul Connection (Enja, 1993; released 1994)
- Bebop City (Enja, 1994; released 1995)
- Balkan Connection (Enja, 1995; released 1996)
- European Dream (Paddle Wheel, 1997, released 1999)
- 'Round Midnight: Live At Lexington Hall (Paddle Wheel, 1998; released 1999)
- Golden Earrings (Paddle Wheel, 1998; released 1999)
- Portrait (Enja, 2002 compilation)
- In My Dreams (Enja, 2001)
- 5 Horns and Rhythm (Enja, 2002)
- Samba Do Mar (Enja, 2003)
- A Handful o' Soul (Enja, 2005)
- Samba Tzigane (Enja, 2006)
- Summit Octet: Five Horns & Rhythm (B92, 2008, released 2010)
- Tight But Loose (Organic Music, 2011) – with Scott Hamilton
- The Brandenburg Concert (Enja, 2013) – with Strings album
- Latin Haze (PGP RTS/Enja, 2014)

=== As sideman ===
With the Kenny Clarke/Francy Boland Big Band

- The Golden 8 (Blue Note, 1961)
- Swing, Waltz, Swing (Philips, 1966)
- Faces (MPS, 1968)
- Latin Kaleidoscope (MPS, 1968)
- Fellini 712 (MPS, 1969)
- All Blues (MPS, 1969)
- More Smiles (MPS, 1969)
- Off Limits (Polydor, 1970)
- November Girl with Carmen McRae (Black Lion, 1975)

With Maynard Ferguson

- The New Sounds of Maynard Ferguson and His Orchestra (Cameo 1964)

With Joe Haider

- One for Klook (Sound Hills, 2004)

With Woody Herman

- My Kind of Broadway (Columbia, 1964)
- Live in Antibes (France's Concert, 1965; released 1988)
- Woody's Winners (Columbia, 1965)
- Jazz Hoot (Columbia, 1965; released 1974)
- Woody Live East and West (Columbia, 1965/1967)

With Dušan Prelević

- U redu, pobedio sam (RTB, 1991)

With Oscar Pettiford

- Lost Tapes: Baden-Baden 1958–1959 (Jazzhaus, 2013)

With Alvin Queen

- Ashanti (Nilva, 1981)

With Sarajevo Big Band and Sinan Alimanović

- Najveći koncert u gradu (Mascom, 2000)
