= Opus 1 (Opus album) =

Studio album by Opus
- Released: 1975
- Recorded: August 1975
- Studios: PGP-RTB Studio V, Belgrade
- Genres: Progressive rock; symphonic rock
- Length: 38:39
- Label: Diskos
- Producer: Aleksandar Pilipenko

Opus 1 is the lone studio album by Yugoslav progressive rock band Opus, released in 1975.

== Recording and release ==
The band Opus, formed and led by organist Miodrag Okrugić, from its formation in 1973 until the final breakup in 1979 went through two breakups and reformations and numerous lineup changes. Opus 1 was recorded after the band's first reformation, in 1975, in the lineup which, beside Okrugić, featured Slobodan Orlić (a former Siluete members, bass guitar), Ljubomir Jerković (drums), and Dušan Prelević (a former Korni Grupa member, vocals). The album was recorded during August 1975, in PGP-RTB's Studio V. The album, released in luxurious sleeve designed by Dragan S. Stefanović, featured symphonic rock-oriented sound.

The song "Opus / Žena tame", was previously, under the name "Opus No.1", performed by Okrugić's former band YU Grupa, but never recorded. The song "Memento Mori" featured Dah frontman Zlatko Manojlović as guest vocalist.

== Track listing ==
All songs written by Miodrag Okrugić, except where noted.

Side A: Žena tame (Woman of Darkness)
| No. | Title | Lyrics | Music | Length |
|---|---|---|---|---|
| 1. | "Magija \ Zveri u nama" ("Magic \ The Beasts in Us") | | | 4:57 |
| 2. | "Čudno je u magli" ("It's Strange in the Fog") | | | 4:25 |
| 3. | "Viđenje po Grigu" ("As Seen by Grieg") | | | 5:40 |
| 4. | "Opus \ Žena tame" ("Opus \ Woman of Darkness") | Miodrag Okrugić; Slobodan Orlić | Miodrag Okrugić | 4:30 |

Side B: Žena oblaka (Woman of Clouds)
| No. | Title | Length |
|---|---|---|
| 1. | "Dolina bisera" ("Valley of Pearls") | 5:13 |
| 2. | "Skupljač zvona" ("Collector of Bells") | 5:13 |
| 3. | "Frida \ Žena oblaka" ("Frida \ Woman of Clouds") | 4:47 |
| 4. | "Memento Mori" | 3:54 |

== Personnel ==
- Miodrag Okrugić - organ, piano
- Slobodan Orlić - bass guitar
- Ljubomir Jerković - drums
- Dušan Prelević - vocals

=== Additional personnel ===
- Zlatko Manojlović - vocals (on track B4)
- Aleksandar Pilipenko - producer
- Dušan Vojković - engineer
- Tahir Durkalić - engineer
- Dragan S. Stefanović - design

== Reception and legacy ==
The album was not well received by Yugoslav music critics, who expected more from the band on the basis of their live performances. The same year Opus 1 was released, Opus disbanded (reforming in 1977).

Years later, in an interview, Prelević expressed his disliking for the album, stating that the "album cover was great, but there's nothing inside". However, the album has received new attention and a cult status in the decades following its release.

== Reissue ==
In 2013, Opus 1 was reissued on both CD and vinyl by Austrian record label Atlantide.

== Legacy ==
In 2015, Opus 1 album cover, designed by Dragan S. Stefanović, was ranked 22nd on the list of 100 Greatest Album Covers of Yugoslav Rock published by web magazine Balkanrock.
