= Vlada i Bajka =

- Vladimir Marković "Vlada" (left) and Dragutin Balaban "Bajka" (right) performing at the 1973 Opatija festival

Background information
- Also known as: Vlada & Bajka
- Origin: Belgrade, Serbia, Yugoslavia
- Genres: Folk rock, soft rock, pop rock
- Years active: 1968 – 1975; 1993 – 1995 (reunions: 2011)
- Labels: PGP-RTB, PGP-RTS, Jugoton Beograd
- Past members: Vladimir Marković; Dragutin Balaban

Vlada i Bajka (Serbian Cyrillic: Влада и Бајка; trans. Vlada and Bajka) were a Serbian and former Yugoslav acoustic music duo from Belgrade, consisting of Vladimir Marković "Vlada" and Dragutin Balaban "Bajka".

== History ==
=== Early history (1968–1975) ===
The duo Vlada i Bajka was formed in 1968 by the childhood friends Vladimir Marković "Vlada" and Dragutin Balaban "Bajka", both playing acoustic guitars and singing lead and backing vocals, after becoming members of the AKUD (Serbian for amateur cultural-artistic society) Branko Krsmanović, being one of the pioneers of the Serbian acoustic rock scene. Three years later, in 1971, with the AKUD Branko Krsmanović, the two went on a United States tour, simultaneously performing as a duo in university clubs the material consisting of cover versions of Simon & Garfunkel songs. Having returned from the US, the two recorded a cover version of the Simon & Garfunkel song "The Sound of Silence", with lyrics in Serbian language entitled "Zvuk tišine" ("The Sound of Silence"), and with the song recording they won the competition on the Studio VI vam pruža šansu (Studio VI Gives You a Chance) radio show, getting the opportunity to release a single.

Their debut single, released by PGP-RTB in 1971, featured "Zvuk tišine" as the single B-side, whereas the A-side was yet another Simon & Garfunkel cover version, "Cecilia". At the time, they had also established a good relationship with Radio Belgrade, often performing live in the studio during the evening program, as well as the television shows Serija koje nema (A Series that is Gone) and Pozdravite sve kod kuće (Say Hello to Everyone at Home). With Marković's songs, the duo also appeared at the major Yugoslav popular music festivals: the 1973 Opatija festival, with the song "Dok te gledam" ("While I am Looking at You"), the 1973 Festival Omladina, with the song "Lutanja" ("Wanderings") and the 1974 Belgrade Spring festival, with the song "Novi svet" ("New World"). Following the release of a four track EP Dok te gledam, the songs "Lutanja" and "Novi svet" were released on single by PGP-RTB in 1973.

With the release of the single "Oblak" ("A Cloud"), with "Za koju noć" ("In a Few Nights") as the B-side, featuring the lyrics from a poem by Dobriša Cesarić, which had become their most popular recording, the band ceased their discography activities, and after occasional club performances, the duo disbanded. After the Vlada i Bajka disbandment, both Marković and Balaban joined the Radio Television Belgrade choir. Marković finished the Belgrade Music academy and started working as a producer at the Radio Belgrade Studio VI, and Balaban graduated at the Belgrade Faculty of Dramatic Arts organizing sector and became a marketing agent for Radio Television of Serbia and in the 1990s he became the editor of the Belgrade Radio 101.

=== Re-formation (1993–1995) ===
The "Magnificent Seven", clockwise: Dragan Bjelogrlić, Nikola Kojo, Bora Đorđević, Dušan Prelević, Dragutin Balaban, Vladimir Marković and Dragan Nikolić

In 1993, the duo was reformed and from November until June of the following year, the two were recording material for their first full-length album, Ja nisam ja (I am not I), released by PGP-RTS in 1994. The recording sessions featured numerous guest musicians and the song "Beograd" ("Belgrade") featured guest appearances by singers Bora Đorđević and Dušan Prelević, and actors Dragan Nikolić, Nikola Kojo and Dragan Bjelogrlić. The album featured fourteen songs, including a rerecorded version of "Oblak", with Marković, Balaban and producer Enco Lesić signed as music authors whereas the song lyrics featured quotations from Branko Radičević's poetry, and lyrics by Dušan Kovačević, Ratko Adamović and Petar Lazić. At the same time, the song "Oblak" appeared on Komuna compilation album Sve smo mogli mi: Akustičarska muzika (We Could Have Done All: Acoustic Music), which featured songs by Yugoslav acoustic rock acts.

After the album release, the band organized a live promotion of the album with a concert Odbrana Beograda (Defending Belgrade), on April 5, 1995, alluding on the growing popularity of turbo folk music in Serbia. Songs recorded at the concert were released, along with three studio tracks, "Beograd", "Duga zlatna nit" ("A Long Golden Thread") and "Oj Devojko, Dušo Moja" ("O, Girl, My Darling"), on a compact cassette live album Moj Beograd - Live by Jugoton Beograd during the same year, after which the duo disbanded once again. From 2001 until 2006 Marković was the general manager of PGP-RTS, and in the meantime, in 2004, he wrote the music for the Dragan Marinković movie Take a Deep Breath.

=== Reunion (2011) ===
In April 2011, the two reunited in order to participate the Band aid for Japan project organized Radio Television of Serbia as a support for the people of Japan after the Great East Japan earthquake. The single, for which a promotional video had also been recorded, "Kokoro ni ai o" ("Smile Instead of Tears"), beside the duo also featured Lena Kovačević, Bilja Krstić, Ana Milovanović, Ljuba Ninković, Duda Bezuha and the Radio Television of Serbia children choir. During the same year, on December 10, the duo appeared at the 50th anniversary celebration of the Festival Omladina, performing the song "Oblak".

== Discography ==
=== Studio albums ===
- Ja nisam ja (1994)

=== Live albums ===
- Moj Beograd - Live (1995)

=== Extended plays ===
- Dok te gledam (1973)

=== Singles ===
- "Cecilia" (1971)
- "Novi svet" (1973)
- "Oblak" (1975)
