= Truth Be Told (2012 film) =

- Theatrical poster
- Directed by: Gregorio Smith
- Produced by: Gregorio Smith; Mark Mahler
- Music by: George Ilijin
- Production companies: Smithkraft Productions, LLC
- Release date: 2012
- Running time: 86 minutes
- Country: United States

Truth Be Told is a 2012 documentary film about growing up in the Jehovah's Witnesses denomination. The title refers to the Jehovah's Witnesses' perception that their beliefs are 'the truth'.

== Overview ==
Truth Be Told focuses on seven individuals raised in the Jehovah's Witnesses denomination. In a series of informal interviews, they reveal experiences including the effects of proselytizing door-to-door, shunning non-observant family and friends, suffering the discouragement of pursuing goals such as higher education and missing other societal holidays and customs. The film cuts between talking-head interviews and visual storytelling techniques including dramatic reenactments, motion graphic sequences and montages.

The documentary features an interview with retired mixed martial arts fighter and television personality Nathan Quarry. Quarry grew up as a member of the Jehovah's Witnesses in a variously oppressive and controlling environment. After a period of self-discovery, Quarry rejected his Jehovah's Witness upbringing, which caused him to become alienated from his family and former friends in 2012.

According to a Gothamist review, "the documentary aims to 'lift the veil on the seemingly benign Jehovah's Witnesses religion to expose a profit-driven, isolationist culture characterized by fear, totalitarian corporate leadership, intellectual & spiritual intimidation, suspension of critical thinking, failed prophecies, doctrinal inconsistency and improper handling of physical and sexual abuse allegations within the church.'"

The documentary is the first feature-film directed by Gregorio Smith. He describes the film as an honest glimpse into the culture of growing up in the Jehovah's Witnesses denomination that is at once immersive, informational, expository and controversial.
