= Opus (Yugoslav band) =

Yugoslav progressive rock band

- The last Opus lineup, in 1979, from left to right: Zoran Dašić, Dragan Baletić, Vidoja Božinović, Miodrag Okrugić, Slobodan Orlić, Vladan Dokić

Background information
- Origin: Belgrade, SR Serbia, SFR Yugoslavia
- Genres: Progressive rock; symphonic rock
- Years active: 1973–1974; 1975; 1977–1979
- Labels: Jugoton, Diskos
- Past members: Miodrag Okrugić; Miodrag Kostić; Dušan Ćućuz; Slobodan Orlić; Ljubomir Jerković; Dušan Prelević; Želimir Vasić; Milan Matić; Vladan Dokić; Zoran Dašić; Vidoja Božinović.

Opus (Serbian Cyrillic: Опус) was a Yugoslav progressive rock band formed in Belgrade in 1973. Opus was a prominent act of the 1970s Yugoslav rock scene.

Formed and led by former YU Grupa keyboardist Miodrag "Mive" Okrugić, the band went through several lineup changes, its various lineups featuring notable musicians like guitarist Miodrag "Bata" Kostić, vocalist Dušan Prelević and guitarist Vidoja "Džindžer" Božinović. The band released only one studio album, ending their activity in 1979.

== Band history ==
The band's leader, keyboardist Miodrag "Mive Okrugić", started his career in the 1960s, playing in the bands Beduini (The Bedouins ), Beat Quintet, and Duka i Čavke (Duka and the Jackdaws), before being invited to join the newly-formed YU Grupa in 1970. After only a year spent with the band, Okrugić left YU Grupa to form his own group. However, his plans were interrupted as he was drafted to serve his mandatory stint in the Yugoslav army.

After serving his army stint, in 1973, Okrugić formed Opus with guitarist Miodrag "Bata" Kostić (a former Terusi and YU Grupa member), bass guitarist Dušan Ćućuz (a former Džentlmeni member) and drummer Velibor "Boka" Boganović (a former YU Grupa member). The band chose their name after the song "Opus No. 1", which was written by Okrugić's during his work with YU Grupa. The song was often performed live by YU Grupa, but never recorded. The band had only one performance in this lineup, on 11 November 1973, on the concert which was a part of the radio show Veče uz radio (Evening by the Radio) fifth anniversary celebration. Kostić returned to YU Grupa only several weeks after Opus live debut, and was replaced by Ljuba Sedlar, a former member of the bands Plamenih 5, Vizije (The Visions), Siluete, 3UP and Super Grupi (Super Groupie). The new lineup recorded the 7-inch single "Veče" ("Evening") and "Sam" ("Alone"). However, the group soon disbanded, Ćućuz forming the symphonic rock band Tako.

In 1975, Okrugić reformed Opus. The new lineup featured bass guitarist Slobodan Orlić, formerly of Plamenih 5, Siluete, Bitnici (The Beatniks) and Moira, drummer Ljubomir Jerković and vocalist Dušan Prelević, formerly of Korni Grupa. This lineup released the album Opus 1. The album, released in luxurious sleeve designed by Dragan S. Stefanović, featured symphonic rock-oriented songs. It featured "Opus No. 1", renamed to "Opus \ Žena tame" ("Opus \ Woman of Darkness"), the songs "Dolina bisera" ("Valley of Pearls") and "Viđenje po Grigu" ("Seeing by Grieg"), released on a 7-inch single, and the song "Memento Mori", which featured Dah frontman Zlatko Manojlović as guest vocalist. However, the album was not well received, as Yugoslav music critics expected more from the band on the basis of their live performances, and Opus disbanded once again.

In 1977, Okrugić once again reformed Opus. The lineup featured Okrugić, Orlić, Želimir Vasić (drums) and Milan Matić (guitar). After the reunion, the band released the single "Ne dam da budeš srećna" ("I Won't Let You Be Happy") and went through numerous lineup changes. The last lineup featured Okrugić, Orlić, Vladan Dokić (drums), Zoran Dašić (guitar), Vidoja "Džindžer" Božinović (a former Pop Mašina member, guitar), and Dragan Baletić (a former Crni Biseri member, vocals). The last lineup of the band recorded three songs for the needs of Radio Belgrade, Okrugić's compositions "Vizionar" ("Visionary") and "Imala je sive i poštene oči" ("She Had Grey and Honest Eyes") and a cover of traditional song "Poji Mile volove na reci" ("Mile Is Watering the Oxen on the River"). The band finally ended their activity in 1979.

In 2013, Opus 1 was reissued on both CD and vinyl by Austrian record label Atlantide.

== Discography ==
=== Studio albums ===
- Opus 1 (1975)

=== Singles ===
- "Veče" / "Sam" (1974)
- "Dolina bisera" / "Viđenje po Grigu" (1975)
- "Ne dam da budeš srećna" / "Ona je dama" (1977)
