= Texas Flood (band) =

Serbian blues rock band

- Origin: Belgrade, Serbia
- Genres: Blues rock
- Years active: 2006–present
- Labels: Blues Time Records, Multimedia Music
- Members: Nenad Zlatanović; Vladimir Golubović; Ivan Čukić
- Website: texasfloodband.com

Texas Flood is a Serbian blues rock band formed in Belgrade in 2006. Since the formation, the band have established themselves as one of the most prominent blues rock acts of the Serbian rock scene.

== History ==
Texas Flood was formed in 2006 by guitarist and vocalist Nenad Zlatanović, a former junior wrestling state champion and chief of security in a number of Belgrade clubs. Zlatanović chose the name for the band after the blues standard "Texas Flood" by Larry Davis. After a number of lineup changes, the band got a permanent drummer when it was joined by former Riblja Čorba and Bajaga i Instruktori member Vladimir Golubović.

The band released their debut album, entitled Grinnin' In Your Face, in 2009. All the songs on the album were authored by Zlatanović, and it was produced by Vladimir Negovanović, also a former Bajaga i Instruktori member. The title track is a cover of a song by Son House, and the album also included a cover of the song "Mr. Big" by Free. Bass guitar on the album was played by Bata Božanić (formerly of Suncokret) and Dragan Ivanović, and the album featured guest appearances by American musician Billy Gibson on harmonica, Austrian musician Raphael Wressnig on organ, and Hungarian musician Little G Weevil on guitar and vocals. Following the album release, the group performed on a number of blues festivals, and on 18 October 2009 they performed as the opening band for ZZ Top on their concert in Belgrade Arena.

In 2013, Zlatanović released the solo album Naked Blues under the name Mr. Swagger, on which he recorded his own songs, as well as covers of blues classics in acoustic arrangements. In 2009, Texas Flood released the album Tražim ljude kao ja (I'm Looking for the People Like Me), named after a verse from the song "Negde daleko" ("Somewhere Far Away") by Pop Mašina. The album featured covers of songs by Yugoslav rock acts Bijelo Dugme, Tihomir "Pop" Asanović, Pop Mašina, Rok Mašina, Lačni Franz, Time and Azra, as well as one song composed by the Zlatanović, "Da budem tvoj" ("To Be Yours"). The lyrics for the song were co-authored by Ivan Ristić and Irie FM frontman Vukašin Marković. Zlatanović was the main protagonist of the Radio Television of Serbia 2023 documentary film Autoput bluza (Blues Highway), filmed during 2023 on various locations in the United States.

In 2024, the band released the double live album Live at Dom omladine, recorded on their concert held in Belgrade Youth Center.

== Discography ==
=== Studio albums ===
- Grinnin' In Your Face (2009)
- Tražim ljude kao ja... (2019)

=== Live albums ===
- Live at Dom omladine (2024)
