= Dogovor iz 1804. =

Yugoslav rock band

Background information
- Origin: Belgrade, SR Serbia, SFR Yugoslavia
- Genres: Progressive rock; psychedelic rock
- Years active: 1968-1970
- Label: Beograd Disk
- Past members: Nebojša Ignjatović; Robert Nemeček; Aleksandar Stojić; Dejan Vasiljević; Ljuba Sedlar; Aleksandar Farebnaher; Predrag Simić; Stevan Milutinović; Dragan Janjić

Dogovor iz 1804. (Serbian Cyrillic: Договор из 1804., trans. The 1804 Agreement) was a Yugoslav rock band formed in Belgrade in 1968. Although short-lived, the band is notable as one of the pioneers of the Yugoslav progressive and psychedelic rock scenes and for featuring later-prominent musicians Nebojša Ignjatović and Robert Nemeček.

== History ==
=== 1968-1970 ===
The band was formed in November 1968 by Nebojša "Nebe" Ignjatović (acoustic guitar, piano, flute, vocals) and Robert Nemeček (bass guitar). Their name alluded to the beginning of the First Serbian Uprising in 1804. During the following two years, a number of musicians were members of the band: Aleksandar Stojić (guitar, flue), Dejan Vasiljević (double bass), Ljuba Sedlar (guitar), Aleksandar Farebnaher (tabla), Predrag Simić (sitar), Stevan Milutinović (drums), and Dragan Janjić (drums).

Dogovor iz 1804. was one of the first Yugoslav bands to move away from beat and rhythm and blues towards a more progressive sound with influences of music from various cultures. They were also one of the first Yugoslav bands not to perform any covers and to perform only their material. The largest part of the material was composed by Nebojša Ignjatović. The band had notable performances on the 1969 Subotica Youth Festival and Belgrade Guitar Festival. Their song "Sećanje na san" ("Memory of a Dream") was released on the 7-inch single Gitarijada 69 (Guitar Festival 69) by Beograd Disk, alongside the song "Tužan sam kad kiša pada" ("I'm Sad when It Rains") by the band Exodusi. The band recorded the songs "Krug" ("The Circle"), "Vetar" ("The Wind"), "S one strane oblika" ("On the Other Side of Shapes"), today available on YouTube, but never officially released. Having one of their last performances at the 1970 Belgrade Spring festival, the band ended their activity in 1970.

=== Post breakup ===
After the group disbanded, Robert Nemeček moved to Džentlmeni, and in 1972 was among the forming members of the progressive/hard rock band Pop Mašina, with which he achieved large popularity.

Nebojša Ignjatović graduated and later got a magister degree from the Belgrade Faculty of Music Arts. He worked as a professor on the Faculty of Music Arts and played double bass in the Belgrade Philharmonic Orchestra. He was also a member of the orchestra Skovran, the group Renesans, the band Secondhaders, and the New Jersey Symphony Orchestra. In the 1990s, he took part in the Rubber Soul Project. In 2001, he self-released the album Beatless, featuring covers of The Beatles' songs in various genres. He composed music for theatre, short films and animated films. He wrote five books: Da li su rotkvice male crvene životinje (Are Radishes Little Red Animals), Uputstvo za ponašanje građana u II svetskom ratu (Manual for the Behavior of Citizens during World War II), Zašto umiru kan-kan igračice (Why Do Can-can Dancers Die), Kako se čita ovaj tekst (How to Read This Text), and Manifest snobizma (Snobbism Manifesto). The books were all part of the Minut i po (Minute and a Half) series, named after the average attention span of a 21st century reader, and illustrated by Rastko Ćirić. Ignjatović composed music for Ćirić's short animated film Lights and Shadows, and it was released in 2020 on the album Svetlosti i senke (Lights and Shadows).

Stevan Milutinović would play in the bands Dah and Gordi.

The song "Sećanje na san" was released in 1994 on the Komuna compilation album Plima: Progresivna muzika (The Tide: Progressive Music) as a part of the YU retROCKspektiva (YU RetROCKspective) album series.

== Discography ==
- "Sećanje na san" (Gitarijada 69, 1969)
