= Radio Beta RFI =

Former radio station in Belgrade, Serbia

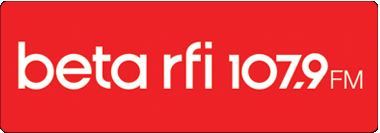

Belgrade; Serbia
- Frequency: 107.9 MHz
- Branding: Radio Beta RFI 107.9

Programming
- Format: News/Talk; Variety hits

Ownership
- Owner: RFI-Beta d.o.o. (joint venture); Beta Press D.O.O. Radio France Internationale

Links
- Website: betarfi.com (now defunct)

Radio Beta RFI was a Belgrade radio station that operated on 107.9 FM. The station ran a news/talk format and was the first full-time talk station in Belgrade. It was a joint venture between the French radio station Radio France Internationale and the renowned Belgrade news agency "Beta". The broadcasts originated from the studios located in Beograđanka.

== History ==
The station was green-lighted following a successful partnership deal between the biggest French radio station Radio France Internationale and Beta Press D.O.O., a private, renowned independent news agency, when they formed a joint venture company called "RFI-Beta d.o.o.", headquartered in Belgrade.

After a period of testing, which begun on February 20, the station had its first official launch on March 2, 2007.

It ceased broadcasting in 2009.

== Programming ==
Beta RFI had a time-share programming during which the broadcasts in Serbian were on the air from 7AM till 7PM CET, while the French broadcasts filled the rest of the time-slot, albeit this has changed on the station lineup for the last few months.

The earliest station schedule was mostly music-driven, with the news airing hourly and quick updates being aired every 30 minutes. The South-Slavic service that broadcast live from the studios in Paris, France of RFI was frequently featured on the station's lineup.

== Exit RFI ==
Following the last transmission in Serbian from RFI South-Slavic staff from France on July 19, 2009, it was announced that RFI abandoned the venture and that station will undergo a likely format flip. The station immediately dropped RFI from its on-air moniker, now simply identifying themselves as "Radio Beta 107.9".

== Closure and relaunch ==
Radio Beta soon faced the change in ownership, leading to a likely format change, and by November 2010, the station management announced that the station will be relaunched and that station was expected to commence broadcasting on November 29, 2010.

The station would have a CHR/Top 40 playlist along with the new on-air identity as "Radio Antena".

Along with the morning, drivetime, and the afternoon show the station would also air occasional informational blocks on the city, nightlife and the current traffic information.
