= Ranko Žeravica Sports Hall =

Indoor sports arena in Belgrade, Serbia

- Хала спортова Ранко Жеравица
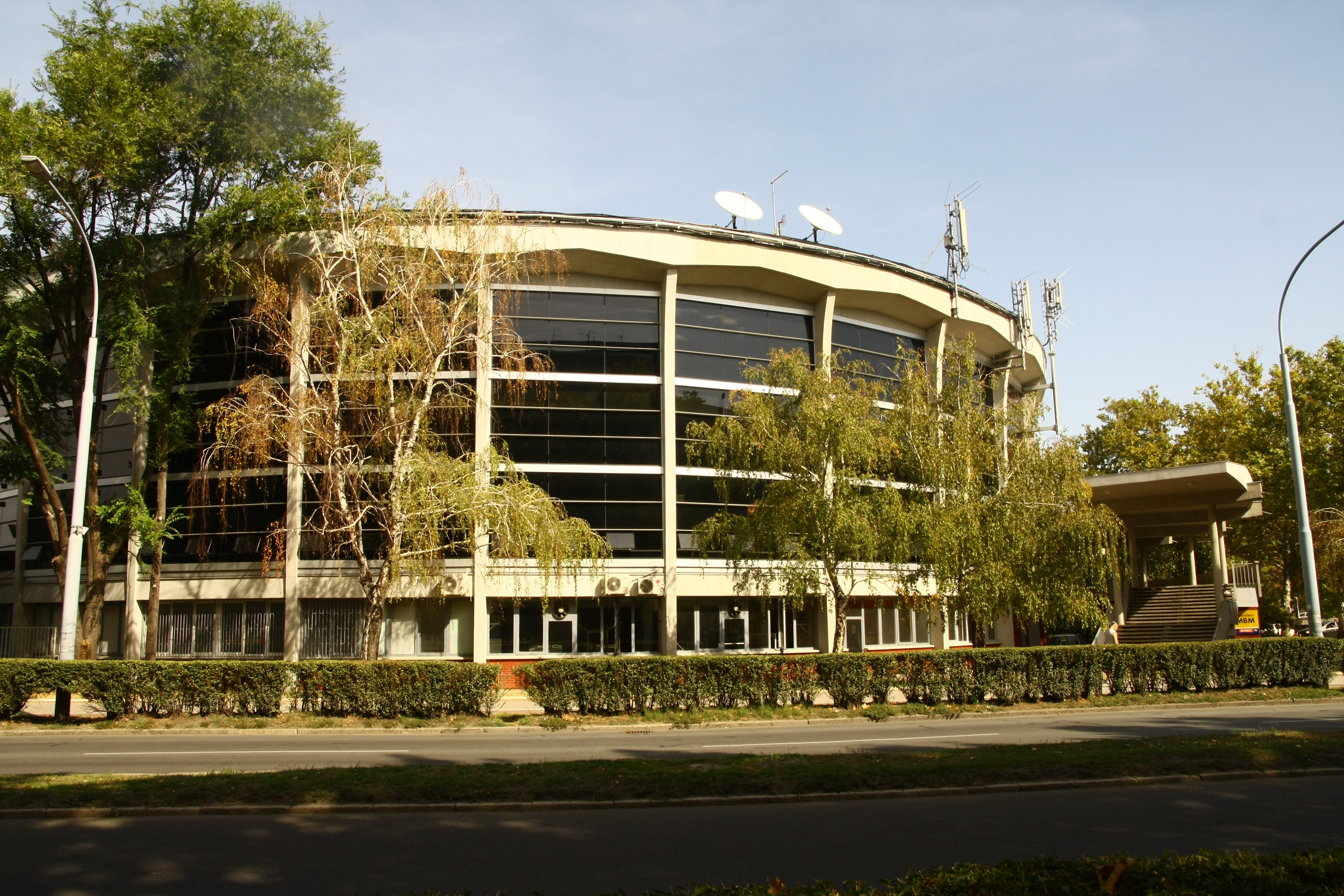
- Ranko Žeravica Sports Hall exterior in September 2012.

- Location within Belgrade
- Former names: New Belgrade Sports Hall (1968–2016)
- Address: Ulica Pariske komune 20
- Location: New Belgrade, Belgrade
- Coordinates: 44°49′39.41″N 20°24′23.03″E
- Owner: City of Belgrade
- Operator: J.P. Sportski centar Novi Beograd
- Capacity: 5,000 (sporting events); 7,000 (musical events)

Construction
- Opened: 1968
- Renovated: 2011

Tenants
- KK Mega Bemax (2019–present); KK Dynamic (2017–present); ŽKK Partizan (2011–present); KK Superfund (2002–2011); KK Novi Beograd (1972–2006); KK Beobanka (1995–2000); KK Partizan (1969–1991); KK Crvena zvezda (1968–1973)

The Ranko Žeravica Sports Hall (Serbian: Хала спортова Ранко Жеравица, romanized: Hala sportova Ranko Žeravica) is a multi-purpose sports arena located in the Belgrade municipality of New Belgrade.

Ranko Žeravica Sports Hall, renamed in 2016 in honor of Serbian basketball coach Ranko Žeravica, is widely known by its informal title Hala. It was built in 1968 and opened in December 1968. Since 1979 it functions as part of a state-owned enterprise JP Sportski centar Novi Beograd. Nearby Sports and Recreation Center 11. April (Sportsko-rekreativni centar 11. april) is also included under its group.

Hala seats up to 5,000 people for sporting events and up to 7,000 for musical events.

In November 2010, the renovation of Hala was announced for 2011. The new-look renovated venue was presented in late of August 2011.

== Sports ==
Hala sportova served as home floor for many Belgrade-based sports teams.

=== KK Partizan ===
The most prominent of them all was Partizan basketball club, which played its home games here from 1970 until 1990. During this time, famous Partizan players like Dragan Kićanović, Dražen Dalipagić, Vlade Divac, Aleksandar Sasha Đorđević, Predrag Danilović and Žarko Paspalj graced Hala's floor. Popular commercial radio jingle promoting Partizan at the time was:

Pođimo u Halu na Novi Beograd
da bodrimo Partizan svima nam je drag,
navijačke pesme zapevajmo svi
volimo Partizan jer je najbolji.

Their finest Hala hour occurred on 22 March 1989 in the second leg of the 1988-89 Korać Cup final. Taking on the Italian club Pallacanestro Cantù (Wiwa Vismara), Partizan came back from the first leg with a 13-point deficit. However, a heroic performance on Hala floor saw them overturn the Italians' lead and win the Cup in high style with a splendid 19-point victory 101-82 behind Divac's 30 points with Paspalj adding 22 and Đorđević 21.

=== Other teams ===
Hala has also been home to basketball's Novi Beograd, known throughout its history of sponsorships as IMT, Infos-RTM, Beopetrol, and Atlas. Another resident was Lavovi.

Other former basketball occupants included now defunct Beobanka (during the 1990s) and occasionally even nomadic BKK Radnički, which at one time or another played its home games in just about every spot within Belgrade city limits that has two hoops and a roof.

In addition to basketball, various handball, boxing, karate, aikido, and judo teams trained and hosted matches and events in Hala.

== Concerts ==
Along with sports, Hala has played host to many shows by a variety of musical acts. They include:

List of concerts and other entertainment events

2010s

- Snarky Puppy - June 23, 2019
- Harlem Globetrotters - May 21, 2019
- Mortal Kombat - May 18, 2019 (opening: Irish Stew of Sindidun and Iskaz)
- 'Bassivity Digital Showcase' - April 20, 2019 (Coby, Senidah, Surreal, Fox, Mili, Kuku$ Klan, Sara Jo, Elon, V.I.P., Arafat, Hazze kolektiv, Rasta, Balkaton Gang)
- Karol Sevilla - April 10, 2019
- Eyesburn / Goblini / Zoster - March 23, 2019
- Partibrejkers - March 22, 2019
- Tom Odell - February 12, 2019
- Schiller - January 18, 2019
- Mando Diao - December 7, 2018
- Beth Hart - December 2, 2018
- Brit Floyd - November 13, 2018
- Brkovi - November 3, 2018
- Texas - September 29, 2018
- Sean Paul - May 22, 2018
- Marcus & Martinus - March 25, 2018
- Caro Emerald - February 27, 2018
- 'Belgrade Metal Meeting' - January 19, 2018 (Vader, Kreator, Dagoba, Noctiferia, Bombarder, Infest)
- Državni posao - November 17, 2017
- Državni posao - November 16, 2017
- Beth Hart - November 11, 2017 (opening: Texas Flood - Stevie Ray Vaughan tribute band)
- Killerwatts - November 4, 2017 (Psytrance, opening: Avalon, DJ Tristan)
- The Beatles Story musical - October 14, 2017
- Gipsy Kings by Paco & Mickael Baliardo - May 11, 2017
- Parov Stelar - April 8, 2017
- Apocalyptica - April 4, 2017
- Gregorian - February 8, 2017
- Galija - December 29, 2016
- Crvena Jabuka - September 17, 2016
- Brkovi - April 1, 2016 (opening: Pero Defformero)
- Hladno Pivo - February 26, 2016 (opening: Raskid13)
- "Samo par godina za nas": Koncert u znak sećanja na EKV - February 19, 2016 (Dejan Cukić, Tanja Jovićević, Dado Topić, Ivana Peters, YU Grupa, Bogovići, Revolveri, Neverne Bebe, Cane & Anton, Gile, Zoran Predin, etc.)
- YU Grupa - December 17, 2015
- Parni Valjak - November 28, 2015
- Marčelo & Elemental - October 10, 2015
- Partibrejkers - September 25, 2015
- S.A.R.S. - March 7, 2015 (opening: Sharks, Snakes & Planes)
- Van Gogh - December 12, 2014
- Van Gogh - December 11, 2014
- Goblini - March 8, 2014 (opening: Grate)
- Bad Copy - February 14, 2014 (opening: Who See)
- Manu Chao - September 14, 2013 (opening: Samostalni referenti and Hornsman Coyote)
- Kerber - December 13, 2012
- The Cranberries - December 4, 2012
- Crvena Jabuka - April 21, 2012
- Partibrejkers - March 3, 2012
- Dubioza Kolektiv - December 23, 2011 (opening: S.A.R.S. and Marko Marković)
- Hladno Pivo - December 3, 2011
- Hladno Pivo - December 2, 2011

2000s

- Negative - November 13, 2009
- Hladno Pivo - November 22, 2008
- Paul Anka - April 18, 2008
- Bryan Adams - November 28, 2006
- Kool & The Gang - November 7, 2006
- Viki Miljković - December 18, 2005
- Indira Radić - April 27, 2004
- Faithless - April 18, 2004
- Fun Lovin' Criminals - March 10, 2004
- The Stranglers - February 13, 2004
- Blondie - December 3, 2003
- Placebo - September 2, 2003
- Public Enemy - June 5, 2003
- Roni Size - May 17, 2003
- Soulfly - February 23, 2003
- Urban Experience level 7 - May 10, 2002 (X-Press 2, DJ Josh Wink, Audio Soul Project, DJ Vlada Janjić, DJ Gordan Paunović)
- Kosheen - January 11, 2002
- Stereo MCs - December 7, 2001
- Urban Experience level 10 - September 1, 2001 (DJ Bob Sinclar, DJ Dave Lee, DJ Terry Farley + dancers from Miss Moneypenny's)
- Psihomodo Pop - March 30, 2001
- Reprazent - December 23, 2000 (Roni Size, Krust, MC Dynamite)
- Darko Rundek - December 22, 2000
- KUD Idijoti - December 10, 2000
- Darkwood Dub - February 14, 2000

1990s

- Van Gogh - December 24, 1999
- Sunshine - February 14, 1999
- Sunshine - February 14, 1998
- Laibach - November 14, 1997
- Biohazard - March 10, 1997
- Mira Škorić - January 20, 1994
- Bajaga i Instruktori - September 20, 1993 (Muzika na struju Tour)
- Pat Metheny Group - June 21, 1991
- The Sisters of Mercy - November 9, 1990
- The Mission - October 24, 1990
- Motörhead - March 28, 1990 (opening act: Partibrejkers)

1980s

- Riblja Čorba - May 8, 1985 (Istina Tour)
- Zabranjeno Pušenje - November 4, 1984
- Iron Maiden - December 28, 1982
- Atomsko Sklonište - September 25, 1982
- Riblja Čorba - March 28, 1981 (Pokvarena mašta i prljave strasti Tour)
- Riblja Čorba - March 27, 1981 (Pokvarena mašta i prljave strasti Tour)

1970s

- Fats Domino - March 18, 1977
- Pop Mašina - November 29, 1975
- Pop Mašina - January 4, 1975
- Pop Mašina - January 2, 1974
- Middle of the Road - March 17, 1973 (opening: Korni Grupa)

== See also ==
- List of indoor arenas in Serbia
