= Pussyfoot (film) =

- Theatrical poster
- Directed by: Dusan Sekulovic
- Written by: Dusan Sekulovic
- Produced by: Dusan Sekulovic
- Starring: Irwin Pelkalvski; Jeffrey Coyne; Nikoleta Sekulovic; Lael Logan; Michael De Nola; Shana Chanel
- Music by: George Ilijin
- Release date: 2008
- Running time: 90 minutes
- Country: United States
- Language: English
- Budget: USD 75,000

Pussyfoot is a 2008 comedy film directed by Dusan Sekulovic.

== Synopsis ==
The film tells the story of a bristly-faced resident expat, Irwin, and his friends as they experience their second coming-of-age in New York City. For Irwin, there are “women” and then there are “girls”: women want to get married and girls just want to have fun. For the single Anny, there are three types of men: married, gay and idiots. Polish polka bars, confusing self-help books and a mythical hooker who never sleeps with her clients confound the friends’ American journey.

== Cast ==
The cast includes:

- Atul Singh
- Chiara de Luca
- Christian Georgescu
- Irwin Pelkalvski
- Jason Bittle
- Jeffrey Coyne
- Lael Logan
- Lex Alexander
- Lora Grillo
- Michael De Nola
- Nikoleta Sekulovic
- Paula Panzarella
- Ramona Ganssloser
- Shana Chanel
- Vinny Muffoletto

== Awards and recognition ==
The film screened at the 2008 Fort Lauderdale International Film Festival, was a 2008 Moondance International Film Festival Finalist and was named the Audience Award Feature Film at the 2008 Chashama Film Festival.
