= RTV Politika =

Serbian TV station

RTV Politika (Serbian: РТВ Политика) was a major Serbian TV station, owned by Politika AD, that was on the air from June 28, 1990 until December 31, 2010.

It was founded on June 28, 1990 and it was a majority-owned subsidiary of the aforementioned Politika AD media company that solely dealt in print media up to that point. The station had its own broadcasting frequencies and transmitters that covered most of the territory of Serbia and more than 90% of the population of Serbia.

During NATO bombardment of FR Yugoslavia and afterward, the station has been known for broadcasting unlicensed copies of the latest Hollywood blockbusters. On March 31, 1999, TV Politika broadcast The Matrix two weeks before its official premiere in Serbia and Montenegro. On April 15, 2000 it broadcast a day-long movie marathon with the illegal copies of The World Is Not Enough, American Beauty, Eyes Wide Shut and Star Wars: Episode I – The Phantom Menace in order to divert public attention from the opposition protest rally in Belgrade against Slobodan Milošević. On July 12, 2004, the News programme "Dan" and some other programmes have dropped the Cyrillic script in favour of Latin script at the first time since launching.

The station didn't receive a new license and had to stop broadcasting terrestrially on December 8, 2006. Between 2006 and 2010 it was broadcasting over cable. On December 31, 2010 station was closed.
