= Geller =

Geller (/ˈɡɛlər/ GHEL-ər) is a surname. Depending on one's ancestors' origins, the name may derive from a place name (Geldern in Germany or Gelderland in the Netherlands) or the German word gellen ('to yell'; Middle High German geln, gëllen) meaning 'one who yells'; less probably from the Yiddish word gel ('yellow') meaning the 'yellow man', or the Yiddish word geler, an expression for a redheaded man. It may also be a Russianized respelling of Heller or a variant of the Hungarian first name Gellért.

The following people have the last name Geller:

- Axel Geller (born 1999), Argentine tennis player
- Andrew Geller (1924–2011), American architect
- Bruce Geller (1930–1978), American composer, screenwriter, and television producer
- Efim Geller (1925–1998), Soviet chess player
- E. Scott Geller (born 1942), American behavioral psychologist
- Esther Geller (1921–2015), American painter
- Harold Geller (1916–2005), Australian-born American conductor and composer.
- Harvey Geller (1922–2009), American lyricist
- Henry Geller (1924–2020), American communications lawyer and government official
- Herb Geller (1928–2013), Jazz musician and composer
- Jamie Geller (born 1978), American-born Israeli cookbook author and chef
- Jacob Geller (born 1995), American video essayist
- Jordan Geller (born 1977), American sneaker collector
- Kenneth Geller (born 1947), American lawyer
- Laurence S. Geller (born 1947), British real estate investor
- Margaret Geller (born 1947), American astronomer and astrophysicist
- Max Geller (wrestler) (born 1971), Israeli Olympic wrestler
- Max Geller (activist) (born 1984), American performance artist
- Pamela Geller (born 1958), American blogger, author, political activist, and commentator
- Raul Geller (born 1936), Peruvian-Israeli footballer
- Richard Geller (meditation instructor) (born 1952), president of MedWorks Corporate Meditation Programs
- Richard Geller (physicist) (1927–2007), experimental nuclear and plasma physicist
- Simon Geller (1919–1995), American classical music station radio personality
- Steven Geller (born 1958), American statesman
- Uri Geller (born 1946), alleged Israeli psychic, magician, and television personality
- Uzi Geller (1931–2024), Israeli chess master

== Fictional characters ==
- Jack and Judy Geller, Monica Geller, Ross Geller, characters from the American television sitcom Friends
- Paris Geller, a character from the American television drama Gilmore Girls

== See also ==
- Gellar (disambiguation)
- Heller (surname)
