= Heller =

Heller may refer to:

== People ==
- Heller (surname), various people with the surname

== Arts and entertainment ==
- Heller (band), a Serbian thrash metal band
  - Heller (album), their debut album
- James Heller, a character from the TV series 24
- Jettero Heller, main character in the Mission Earth novels written by L. Ron Hubbard
- Erik Heller, father in the 2011 movie Hanna

== Places ==
- Heller (river), a river in western Germany
- Heller House, a house in Hyde Park, Chicago, Illinois

== Companies ==
- Gebr. Heller, a German manufacturing firm
- Heller SA, a French company that produces plastic scale model kits
- Heller Brewery, part of the Schlenkerla brewpub in Bamberg, Germany
- Heller, Inc., an American furniture and houseware manufacturer and retailer

== Law ==
- Heller Ehrman, an international law firm
- District of Columbia v. Heller, a United States court case regarding the application of the Second Amendment
- Hedley Byrne v. Heller, a 1963 English tort law case

== Other uses ==
- Heller (antitank rocket), a Canadian 1950s weapon
- Heller (coin), originally a German coin later used elsewhere in Central Europe
- Heller School for Social Policy and Management, one of the four graduate schools of Brandeis University

== See also ==
- Heller's test, a chemical test
- Heller myotomy, a surgical procedure
- Heller's syndrome, a neurological disorder
- Guy Hellers (born 1964), Luxembourgish football manager
- Geller, a surname
