= Lucien Lagrange =

American architect

- Born: 1940 (age 85–86); France
- Education: Sherbrooke University; McGill University
- Occupation: architect

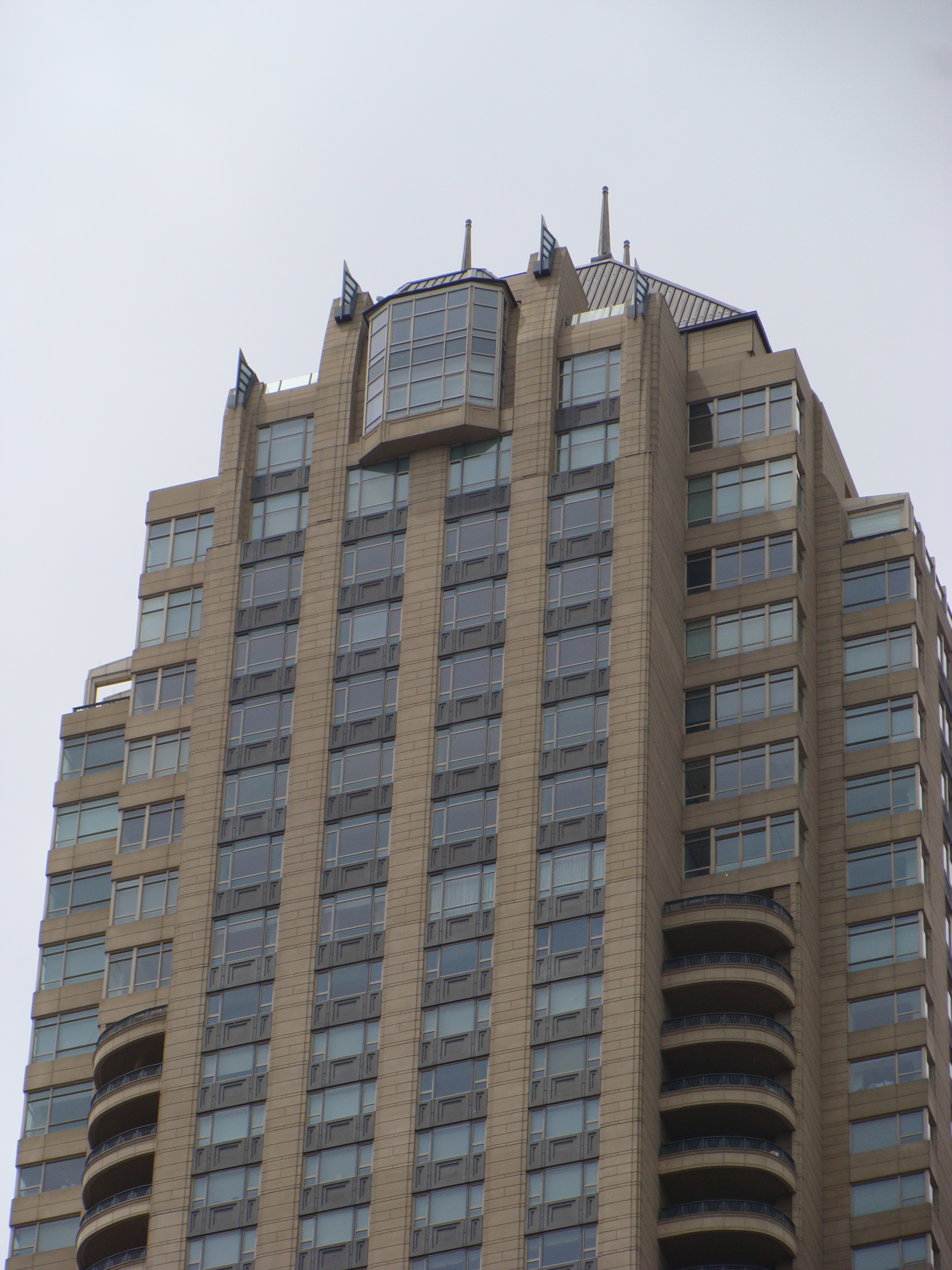
Park Tower in Chicago, designed by Lagrange, completed in 2000

Lucien Lagrange (born 1940 in France) is an architect and a former partner at Skidmore, Owings & Merrill, who founded his own firm, named Lucien Lagrange Architects in 1985. The studio is a representative of New Urbanism and New Classical Architecture.

Lagrange is a French-born architect who came to Chicago, Illinois after studying at McGill University. He currently lives with his Wife. Prior to that he designed Lincoln Park community area house. As an architect, he is inspired by Louis Sullivan and Auguste Perret.

He is currently involved in the construction or renovation of seven notable buildings in Chicago, Illinois: 10 East Delaware, Blackstone Hotel, the Waldorf Astoria Chicago, Lincoln Park 2550, Ritz-Carlton Chicago, 208 South LaSalle and RIU Hotel Lagrange designed the renovation of the Chicago Landmark Carbide & Carbon Building into the Hard Rock Hotel and designed the Park Tower. He has also renovated the Union Station (Chicago) and designed the 29 South LaSalle, 208 South Lasalle, The Pinnacle, and 840 Lake Shore Drive . In 2008 Lagrange designed Manhattan's ultra luxury 535 West End Avenue, which is one of the most prestigious residential addresses in New York City, as well as the Touraine at 65th and Lexington.

He currently is consulting projects both in Dallas and Houston

== Education ==
Lagrange grew up in the Provence region of France as the son of a mason. He lived in France until he was eighteen years old when he moved to Montreal, Quebec in 1959 as a high school dropout. He chose Montreal because they speak French. When he arrived in Montreal he worked various odd jobs and eventually felt a desire to become an architect. He returned to school at age twenty-five. He had to take night classes to complete his high school education. Then, he enrolled at Sherbrooke University in engineering. After his first year, he got accepted to McGill University, which was his first choice for architecture study. He obtained his B.Arch. degree in 1972 from McGill.

During his course of study, he was encouraged to find a job with a major architectural firm in 1968. He came to visit Chicago that year and saw the construction of the John Hancock Center well underway. He had been a draftsman, but now decided to shift from getting odd jobs to getting hired by a major firm. At school, Peter Collins, a professor of his, gave him a book with only the initials S.O.M. on the cover. At the same time he made some business contacts with Ludwig Mies van der Rohe who was working on Westmount Square at a time when Lagrange was doing some shop drawings. He eventually called Mies' office and requested a job, but was told that they only had enough work to take on a few students and were committed to some from the Illinois Institute of Technology. They said they could refer him to either C.F. Murphy or Skidmore, Owings & Merrill (S.O.M.). Because of the book his professor had given him he chose S.O.M for summer 1968 employment.

His skill as a draftsman quickly got him assigned as a designer for Bruce Graham. He credits his summers with Bruce Graham learning how to combine his technical side with learning the design spectrum to successfully put buildings together. He became a top student at McGill and graduated in 1972.

== Post graduate experience ==
After graduating Lagrange had to return to France to fight charges of draft dodging the French Army. He had avoided involvement in French military confrontations in Algeria for twelve years. He won his fight, which enables him to freely return to France. He then returned to Montreal to work for Norbert Schoenauer for a year on a multi-family residential housing project in northern Quebec. Then he worked with S.O.M. who were the urban planners for a Canadian Pacific/Bank of Montreal assignment. He then worked on various assignments in Chicago and Montreal until 1978 when he moved to Chicago permanently.

He worked with S.O.M. on broad range of projects: 40-story skyscraper towers, a 5,000,000 square feet (110 acres; 460,000 m^{2}) property in Los Angeles, California, a building with six hundred apartments in Europe, a transportation centre, hotels, and a very diversified hotel property that included a motel, hotel, apartment building, parking structure, office building, retail. Then in 1985 he left to start Lucien Lagrange Architects.

== Architecture career ==
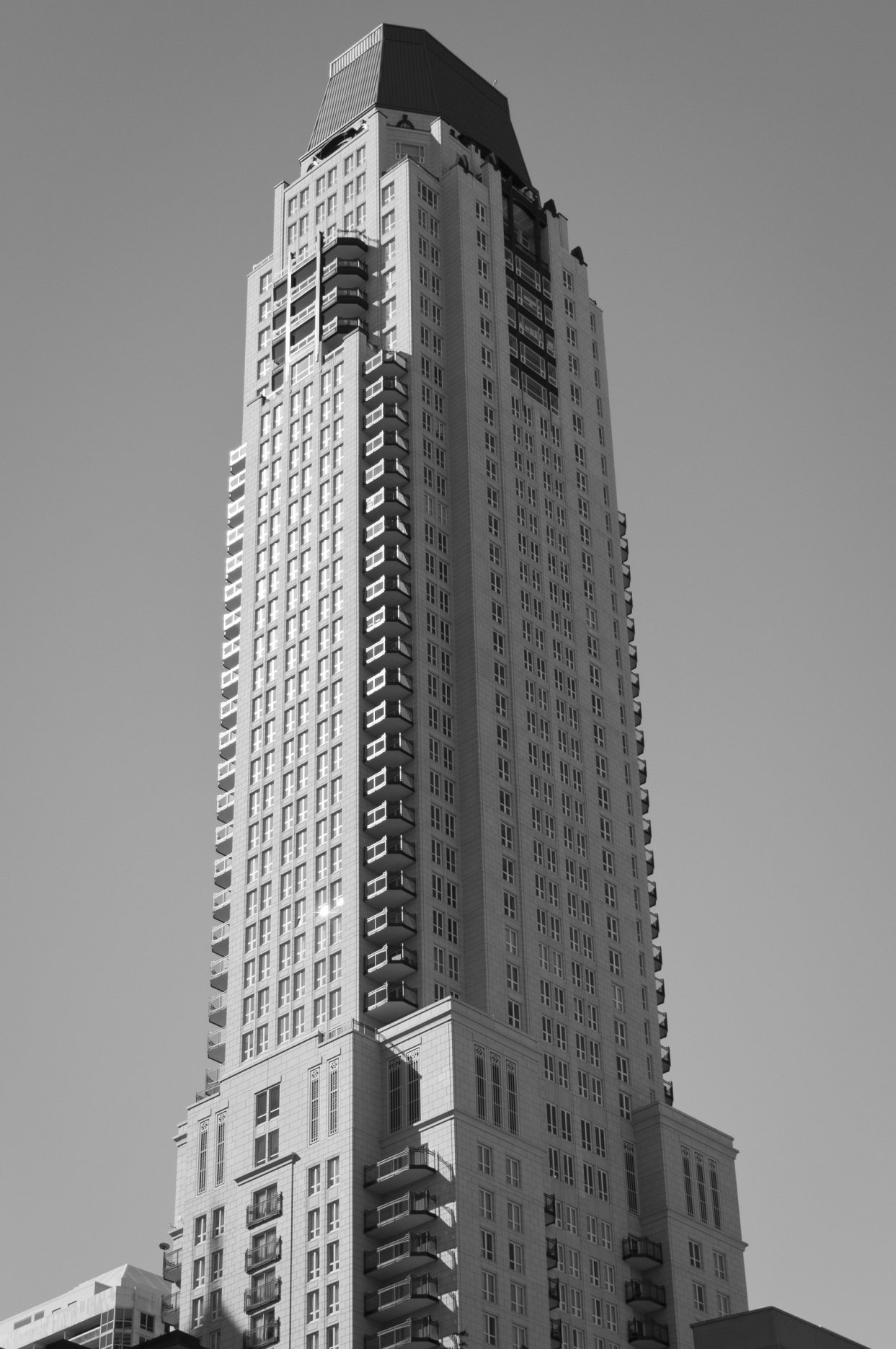
Waldorf Astoria Chicago, completed in 2010

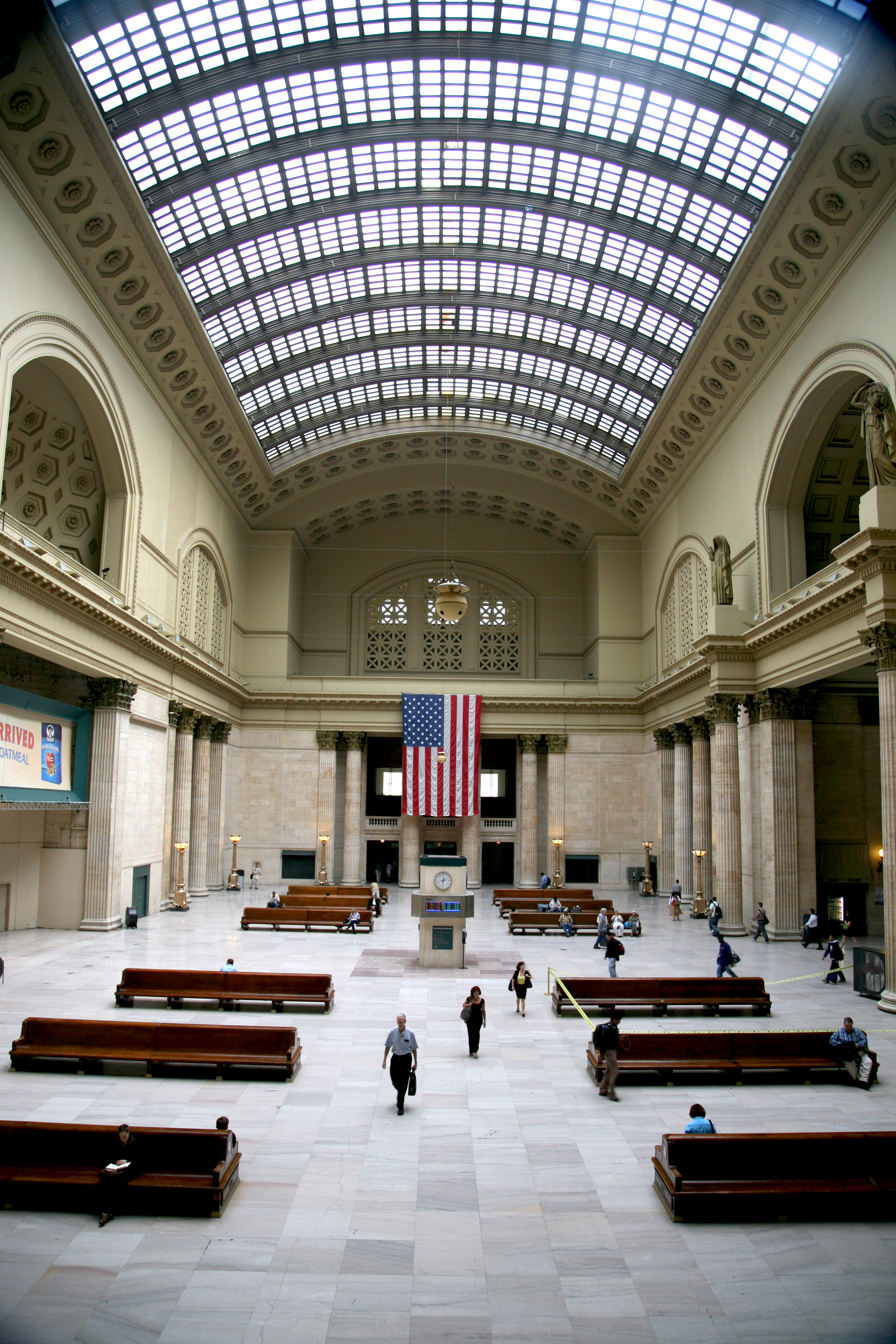
Union Station (Chicago), renovated in 1992 by Lucien Lagrange & Associates

Lagrange has a reputation as Chicago's architect for the wealthy. In fact, he is considered the go-to guy for classically inspired high-end residential buildings. As such he is known for understanding luxurious lifestyle and incorporating it into designs so that art collections, vast wardrobes, jewelry safes, chefs, florists, and refrigerated fur storage are accommodated. As an employer he has a reputation as an oligarchic ruler.

When he was interviewed in 1997 about his first thirty years in architecture he marvelled at two major transformations. First he noted that the advent of the personal computer has changed the zipatone process. Then he noted that the real estate/architecture has also changed because "Projects are financed in a very different way, . . . We don't custom design everything. We use components, which are pre-designed, curtain walls, ceiling tiles. All the systems exist and we just integrate them in the architecture, which also means we can do a set of working drawings a lot faster today."

With the Lincoln Park 2550 project, Lagrange is currently endeavoring to design the property's 3 acres (12,000 m^{2}) so that every unit to have a view of a French garden inspired by an 18th-century chateau that once housed Madame de Pompadour.

Lagrange designed the Catalyst, a contemporary-style $100 million high-rise condominium planned at the northeast corner of Washington and Des Plaines in Chicago's Near West Side community area. Real estate developer Gary Rosenberg said, "Lucien Lagrange, the highly acclaimed award-winning architect for Catalyst, has created a striking geometric 22-story skyscraper, which immediately captures the eye when approaching the Chicago Loop from the [Kennedy] expressway. The building's design is unique with jutting blocks of glass space creating geometric squares and rectangles which seem to float on the building's façade, along with a strong vertical element which highlights the contemporary sleek style."

Lagrange designed the Ritz-Carlton Residences on Chicago's Magnificent Mile, a 40-story condominium tower built at 664 North Michigan Avenue. In 1996, Lucien Lagrange & Associates designed the building to rise at Rush Street and Chicago Avenue on the site then occupied by the 16-story Park Hyatt. In 2008 Lagrange designed Manhattan's ultra Luxury 535 West End Avenue which is one of the most prestigious residential addresses in New York City.

In 2010 Lagrange closed his office and filed chapter 11 bankruptcy while going through a divorce. "Mr. Lagrange declines to comment about the firm's finances and says the Chapter 11 filing was merely a pragmatic business decision he made after deciding it was time to retire."

Lagrange is currently designing under the Lucien Lagrange Studio brand. His most recent work is the Hotel Riu Plaza Chicago on Ontario Street, and Rosewood Residences on Turtle Creek, Dallas.
