= Max Geller =

Max Geller may refer to:

- Max Geller (wrestler) (born 1971), Israeli Olympic wrestler
- Max Geller (activist) (born 1984), American performance artist
