= Veller =

Veller is a surname. Notable people with the surname include:

- Don Veller (1912–2006), American football player and coach
- Mikhail Veller (born 1948), Russian writer
- Willi Veller (1896–1941), German Nazi politician and SA member

== See also ==
- Heller (surname)
- Zeller (surname)
