= Richard Geller =

Richard Geller may refer to:

- Richard Geller (meditation instructor) (born 1952), president of MedWorks Corporate Meditation Programs
- Richard Geller (physicist) (1927–2007), experimental nuclear and plasma physicist
