= Sebastian Smee =

Australian journalist

Sebastian Smee is an Australian-born art critic who currently writes for The Atlantic. He is a former art critic for The Washington Post and the author of several books on art history.

== Education and career ==
Educated at St Peter's College, Adelaide, Smee graduated from the University of Sydney with an Honours degree in fine arts in 1994 and moved to Boston in 2008, having also lived in the United Kingdom between 2001 and 2004. Before joining The Boston Globe he was national art critic for The Australian and has also worked for The Daily Telegraph and contributed to The Guardian, The Times, The Financial Times, The Independent on Sunday, The Art Newspaper, Modern Painters, Prospect magazine and The Spectator.

He won the 2011 Pulitzer Prize for Criticism for his "vivid and exuberant writing about art, often bringing great works to life with love and appreciation".

In 2015, after Smee criticised the "Renoir Sucks at Painting" protest at the Museum of Fine Arts Boston, Max Geller — the leader of the movement – challenged Smee to a duel on Boston Common.

Smee was an art critic at The Washington Post from 2018 to 2026. He joined The Atlantic magazine in June 2026.

== Works ==
Smee is the author of the books Side by Side: Picasso v Matisse (2002) and Lucian Freud (2007). In 2016, The Art of Rivalry was published. The book examines the relationships between four pairs of artists — Matisse and Picasso, de Kooning and Pollock, Freud and Bacon, and Degas and Manet. In 2024, Paris in Ruins: Love, War, and the Birth of Impressionism was published. It devotes attention to the Franco-Prussian War, the Paris Commune, and Impressionist artists, particularly Édouard Manet and Berthe Morisot.

Smee is author of the 72nd issue of the Quarterly Essay titled "Net Loss: The Inner Life in the Digital Age" (2018).

== Publications ==
- Sebastian Smee (2002). Side by Side: Picasso v Matisse, Duffy & Snellgrove, ISBN 978-1-876631-32-1
- Sebastian Smee (2007). Lucian Freud, Taschen, ISBN 978-3-8228-5805-9
- Sebastian Smee (2016). The Art of Rivalry: Four Friendships, Betrayals, and Breakthroughs in Modern Art, Profile Books, ISBN 978-1781251669
- Anita Hill, Sebastian Smee, Cornelia Butler (2018). Mark Bradford, London and New York: Phaidon Press, ISBN 9780714873398
- Smee, Sebastian (2024). Paris in Ruins: Love, War, and the Birth of Impressionism. W. W. Norton & Company. ISBN 978-1-324-00695-4.
