= Prisoners of a White God =

2008 film about Christian missionaries

- Zajatci Bílého Boha
- Directed by: Steve Lichtag
- Produced by: Tomáš Ryška
- Distributed by: Twin Star
- Release date: 2008
- Running time: 51 minutes
- Languages: Czech; English

Prisoners of a White God (Czech: Zajatci Bílého Boha) is a Czech documentary film about the Akha people, produced and distributed by Twin Star in September 2008. The documentary is about a Czech researcher, Tomáš Ryška, who goes to the Thai and Laotian mountains in order to search and document the causes of wrongdoing and violence done to the indigenous peoples and their children by Christian missionaries.

According to the film, the missionaries' altruistic intentions of converting these indigenous people to Christianity hide the human rights violations of land theft, forced relocation, cultural genocide and imposition of power with a racist view on their society. The crimes which the Christian missionaries are accused of include kidnapping of children from their villages to work in tea plantations and the selling of children into the sex trade. The documentary contrasts the apparent wealth and cleanliness of the missionaries with the undercover child trafficking that they carry out. One missionary is seen expressing regret over the revelation of this reality to the outside world as a threat to the continuing work of their organizations among these people.

== Overview ==
The Akha are a people who inhabit the mountain regions of Southeast Asia. They live in small villages and cultivate crops such as rice and opium (a cash crop and medicine for them) using slash-and-burn agriculture. Their lives are governed by a spiritual/legal system called akhazang. Like other hill tribes, the Akha do not have Thai citizenship. As of the beginning of the 21st century, their traditional way of living was being attacked by the Thai and Laotian governments, Christian missionaries, and Western NGOs.

== Film summary ==
=== Thailand ===
Prisoners of a White God begins with a Christian missionary preaching in the streets of Thailand. Then it transitions to an overview of Akha village life and spirituality, which is being increasingly encroached on by Western missionaries who have taken children under the pretense of educating them. These children live in missions and orphanages, speak only Thai, and are not allowed to learn traditional Akha ways. Using an assumed identity, Ryška investigates the living conditions of Akha children in Chiang Rai area missions and orphanages.

Many of the children in the orphanages have parents who are still alive, and there is a glaring contradiction between the relative luxury missionaries live in and the poverty of many Akha villages. One missionary, an Akha named "Luka", owns a tea plantation, but manages to avoid hiring employees thanks to the labor provided by the Akha children at the orphanage he runs.

One missionary, "Vern", discusses how the goal of educating Akha children was to ultimately return them to their home villages to proselytize among their own people. Two others compare the Karen, who have accepted Christianity more readily, to the "aggressive" Akha. However, Ryška explains that the children become adjusted to life in greater society and have a difficult time reentering traditional Akha life.

A common theme the missionaries in the film expressed was how the Akha worship spirits and live in "fear". The film contrasts the "fear" supposedly present in traditional Akha spirituality with the propaganda leaflets depicting hell being distributed in Akha villages. Ryška suggests that Christianity is the true religion of fear and explains in detail on how missionaries stir conflict in villages, buy land, and control converts.

Using a hidden microphone, Ryška manages to record testimonies of sexual abuse committed by missionaries. With this evidence, he returned to Europe for six months.

=== Laos ===
Ryška is invited to Laos. Unlike Thailand, Laos is a communist society and the Akha are not subject to intense proselytization. However, the Laotian government has invited Western NGOs into the country as part of a poverty reduction campaign concerning ethnic minorities such as the Akha. The program involves relocating the Akha to lowland villages (where they deal with unscrupulous Lao customers) and road construction in their traditional lands. Ryška travels to a village in the highlands and finds that the Akha there still manage to practice their traditional lifestyle. However, they are no longer allowed to grow opium. Ryška alludes to the 2003 war on drugs in neighboring Thailand, which killed and injured many Akha whose livelihoods are dependent on opium cultivation.

Returning to the lowlands, Ryška stumbles on an Akha man lying on a road. He visits a lowland Akha village, created via forced relocation, where the Akha succumb to malaria and become tourist curiosities. They live in poverty, without hope, and are dependent on international aid organizations. The Akha villagers allege that workers from the NGOs Action Against Hunger (ACF) and Norwegian Church Aid (NCA) are guilty of rape.

Ryška returns to the mountain village, where he is feted with a feast. He realizes that it will probably the last time he will see the village and vows to tell the story of the Akha, convinced that the development program was a failure that harmed the Akha.

=== Return to and escape from Thailand ===
Ryška travels from Laos to Thailand. He meets a missionary who estimates that 80% of missionaries in the region "fuck around" with a preference for young male victims. After that meeting, other missionaries discover Ryška's actual intentions and conspire with corrupt police to detain and murder him. He is alerted by a friend who advises him to leave the country. As he leaves his hotel room, he encounters missionaries who try to put him into a car but manages to escape. Ryška hides in the garden of a Buddhist temple and contacts the Czech embassy, which advises him to leave the region. He manages to leave Chiang Rai by air despite encountering missionaries at the airport. As he leaves Thailand, Ryška questions if the good that the missionaries and Western NGOs do can balance the harm they have done to the Akha and expresses confidence that he will be able to expose the missionaries for what they are.

The film concludes with footage of Ryška at the United Nations in New York City, where some of his findings are presented at the United Nations Permanent Forum on Indigenous Issues. It also notes that the NCA changed its policies after an internal investigation confirms Ryška's findings and that other indigenous peoples around the world are suffering fates similar to that of the Akha.

== Cast ==
- Tomáš Ryška is a Czech anthropologist and the director of the film. He first met the Akha as a tourist to Thailand after graduating from Masaryk University. He returned to the region to study the ways of the Akha, which led him to create the film after learning about the abusive behavior of missionaries from an Akha chief. At the end of the film, it is mentioned that Ryška was pursuing a PhD in anthropology from Charles University and became a director at UWIP (United World of Indigenous Peoples), an NGO that researches indigenous people.
- Luka, an Akha missionary. He manages an orphanage and a tea plantation staffed by the children who live in the orphanage.
- Vern, another missionary in Thailand. He operates an all-girls orphanage.
- Ashuli, a missionary associated with OMF International.

== Awards ==
The documentary won the Grand Prixes at RAFF Film Festival, Ekofilm Festival, Festival of the Mountain Films, "It's Up To You" Film Festival, the Main Prize at Ekotopfilm in 2008 and the award for "the best script of a feature-length documentary film" at the Berdyansk International Film Festival.

== See also ==
- Stolen Generations
- Friends of Peoples Close to Nature
- Canadian Indian residential school system
- Cultural genocide
