= Hotel Riu Plaza Chicago =

Hotel in Chicago, Illinois

General information
- Classification: 4-star
- Location: Streeterville, Chicago, Illinois, United States, 150 East Ontario Street
- Coordinates: 41°53′37″N 87°37′24″W
- Opening: July 18, 2024
- Owner: RIU Hotels & Resorts

Height
- Height: 105.2 m (345 ft)

Technical details
- Floor count: 28

Design and construction
- Architects: Lucien Lagrange; Lamar Johnson Collaborative
- Developer: The Prime Group
- Main contractor: W.E. O'Neil Construction

Other information
- Number of rooms: 390

Website
- www.riu.com/en/hotel/united-states/chicago/hotel-riu-plaza-chicago/

Hotel Riu Plaza Chicago is a four-star hotel at 150 East Ontario Street in the Streeterville neighborhood of Chicago, Illinois, United States. Owned and operated by RIU Hotels & Resorts, it opened on July 18, 2024, with 390 rooms in a 28-story building near the Magnificent Mile. The 105.2 m (345 ft) tower was developed by The Prime Group and designed by Lucien Lagrange, with Lamar Johnson Collaborative as architect of record.

== History ==
Plans for the hotel were first made public in April 2021, when an entity associated with RIU Hotels & Resorts proposed a hotel at 150 East Ontario Street, a mid-block infill site just off Michigan Avenue. Early filings described a 388-room project; the completed hotel opened with 390 rooms. The proposal came while Chicago hotel occupancy was still affected by the COVID-19 pandemic, with RIU planning to draw on its network of international travelers rather than relying on local demand alone.

The Chicago Plan Commission granted preliminary zoning approval in July 2021. The Chicago City Council approved the planned development on July 21, 2021. The approved plan called for a 345-foot-tall (105 m) hotel building with no on-site parking, a lobby, coffee shop, breakfast room, green roof and two internal loading berths. The initial project cost was estimated at US$145 million, including a planned US$2.9 million payment to the city's Neighborhood Opportunity Fund.

Construction started in 2022 and was completed in 2024. RIU bought the land in late 2021 for slightly more than US$28 million; the Riu family later financed construction with about US$150 million in cash, at a time when construction lending for hotel projects remained constrained. A 2021 report described the broader planned investment as a US$200 million project and noted that the company did not intend to seek outside financing for construction.

The hotel opened on July 18, 2024, becoming the fifth RIU Plaza urban hotel in the United States and the eleventh in the chain worldwide.

== Architecture and features ==
The building is 105.2 m (345 ft) tall with 28 above-ground floors. The Prime Group was developer, W.E. O'Neil Construction general contractor, Lucien Lagrange design architect and Lamar Johnson Collaborative architect of record.

The tower occupies an infill lot between existing structures on East Ontario Street, close to the Magnificent Mile. Its exterior has a white, classically influenced façade with terraced setbacks, cornices and a bifurcated crown. Earlier renderings indicated architectural concrete panels intended to resemble stone on the upper portion of the tower, precast concrete at the base and dark granite at street level. W.E. O'Neil's project description also described the exterior as using painted architectural concrete and aluminum-framed windows rather than a brick or glass curtain-wall façade.

The interior includes a lobby, restaurant, lobby bar with grab-and-go service and a gym. A mural along the lobby frieze uses an Art Deco-influenced composition combining marble, wood and recycled elements. The guest rooms have light-colored furniture, iron structures and walk-in showers.

== The Rooftop ==
The Rooftop is the hotel's terrace bar on the 27th floor, open to hotel guests, other visitors and local residents. It opened in September 2024, after the hotel had begun operating.

The bar has panoramic views of the city skyline. Its main architectural feature is a projecting glass balcony 88 m (289 ft) above street level, modeled on the glass balcony at the Hotel Riu Plaza España in Madrid. Pre-completion renderings also showed the glass-floor balcony extending from the rooftop terrace.
