= Rettet die Naturvölker =

German indigenous rights organization

fPcN interCultural
- Abbreviation: fPcN
- Formation: October 1, 1991; 35 years ago
- Founder: Hartmut Heller
- Founded at: Lauenburg, Germany
- Type: Non-governmental organization
- Purpose: Indigenous rights
- Headquarters: Ludwigslust, Germany
- Region served: Worldwide
- Chair: Arne Salisch, Katarina Respondek
- Website: naturvoelker.de

Rettet die Naturvölker (Save the nature peoples, abbreviation: RdN) is a German non-governmental human rights organization that works in the field of indigenous rights. Formerly known as Freunde der Naturvölker (FdN), using the official English names Friends of People Close to Nature (fPcN) and fPcN interCultural, it was founded by Hartmut Heller on 1 October 1991, headquartered in Lauenburg. Since the death of its founder and first chairman in 2003, the fPcN has been headquartered in Ludwigslust. As of 2025, its current chairs are Arne Salisch and Katarina Respondek. The fPcN's campaigns are carried out on a global level, with members traveling to East Africa, the Amazon rainforest and the Philippines.

== Mission ==
fPcN sees the "afflictions" of indigenous peoples lying in the imposition of alien interests and not in a deficiency of their way of living.

== Documentary films ==
fPcN has produced several field documentaries about the struggles of aboriginal peoples. In 1998, fPcN produced a short film about the Aeta people, called Save the Savages, about tribal people in the Philippines. The film praises the peoples' cooperative way of life and how they are threatened by logging and mining activities.

fPcN has been involved in making several documentaries about the struggle of the people of West Papua region, which is administered by Indonesia. Blood On the Cross is a 1999 ABC documentary about the Red Cross's involvement in the World Wildlife Fund hostages saga in 1996 and their alleged connection to the resulting slaughter of the indigenous peoples of West Papua. Mark Davis investigates allegations about the role of the International Red Cross and the British military in a massacre in the southern highlands of West Papua in May 1996. The Red Cross subsequently set up an independent investigation of the claims, which found them to be erroneous.

In 2003, fPcN released the documentary Papua Merdeka (Papua Free), about the struggle of the West Papuan aboriginal nations and clans for independence from Indonesian dominance. It includes historical footage of events showing the UN vote that allowed for the continuing colonization and exploitation of their natural resources. In 2007, fPcN released the documentary West Papua - The secret war in Asia about the war against tribal people on New Guinea. It describes the exploitation of West Papua by Indonesia in alliance with international companies and the violent suppression of dissent. At least 100,000 Papuans have lost their lives in this conflict. Forgotten Bird of Paradise is a documentary made with fPcN interCultural assistance and co-operation, released in 2009. Filmed undercover in West Papua 2008, this documentary reveals the efforts of the West Papuan people in resisting the occupation of their ancestral homeland.

Prisoners of a White God is a documentary about the Akha people, produced and distributed by Twin Star in September 2008. It won the Grand Prix at RAFF Film Festival, at Ecofilm Festival, at Festival of the Mountain Films, at "It's Up To You" Film Festival and the Main Prize at Ekotopfilm in 2008. It is about a Czech researcher who goes to the Thail and Laosen mountains in order to search and document the causes of alleged wrongdoing and violence done to the indigenous peoples and their children by Christian missionaries.

== See also ==
- Indigenous peoples
- Papua Conflict
- Settler colonialism
