= Gellar =

Gellar may refer to:

- Gellar-e Mohammad Hasan, a village in Ardabil Province, Iran
- Gellar-e Mohammad Taqi, a village in Ardabil Province, Iran
- Sarah Michelle Gellar, an American actress
- Caitlyn Gellar, a fictional character in Camp Rock
- James Gellar, a fictional character in Dexter

== See also ==
- Geller, a surname
