= Heller (surname) =

Heller is a surname. Notable people with the surname include:

- Ágnes Heller (1929–2019), Hungarian philosopher
- Amalia Heller (born 1951), Venezuelan television presenter and beauty pageant winner
- Amos Arthur Heller (1867–1944), American botanist
- André Heller (born 1947), Austrian artist, musician, entertainer
- André Heller (volleyball) (born 1975), Brazilian volleyball player
- Arnold Krumm-Heller (1876–1949), Gnostic archbishop
- Becca Heller, American human rights lawyer
- Ben Heller (born 1991), American baseball player
- Bill Heller (1935–2020), American politician and educator
- Bruno Heller (born 1960), British television and film writer
- Camill Heller (1823–1917), Czech / Austrian zoologist
- Carlos Heller (born 1940), Argentine executive and politician
- Carol Heller, vocalist, guitarist: +44 (band)
- Craig Heller (writer), American television soap opera script writer
- Dean Heller (born 1960), American Senator
- Dov Tzvi Heller (1862–1935), Lithuanian Haredi rabbi
- Edmund Heller (1875–1939), American zoologist
- Eric J. Heller (born 1946), American theoretical chemist
- Erich Heller (1911–1990), European thinker and essayist
- Fanya Heller (1924–2017), Holocaust survivor
- Florian Heller (born 1982), German footballer
- George Heller, president and CEO of Hudson's Bay Company
- Guy Heller, vocalist (aka Dickie Moist): Moistboyz
- H. Robert Heller (born 1940), economist, Governor of the Federal Reserve Board and CEO of Visa
- Hartmut Heller (died 2003), German indigenous rights and anarcho-primitivst activist
- Hermann Heller (legal scholar) (1891–1933), German philosopher
- Hermann Heller (Swiss politician) (1850–1917)
- Isaac Heller (1926–2015), American toy manufacturer, co-founder of Remco
- Jean Heller, American journalist and writer
- Jehiel Heller (1814–1861), Imperial Russian rabbi
- Jerry Heller (1940–2016), music manager
- John R. Heller Jr. (1905–1989), head of the U.S. National Cancer Institute in 1948-1960
- Josef Heller, German-Czechoslovak luger
- Joseph Heller (1923–1999), author of Catch-22
- Joseph Heller (historian) (born 1937), Israeli historian
- Joseph Heller (zoologist) (born 1941), Israeli zoologist
- Karl Bartholomaeus Heller (1824–1880), Austrian botanist and naturalist
- Karl Borromaeus Maria Josef Heller (1864–1945), Austrian entomologist
- László Heller (1907–1980), Hungarian inventor
- Lisa Heller (born 1996), singer and songwriter
- Lukas Heller (1930–1988), screenwriter
- Marcel Heller (born 1986), German footballer
- Maximilian Heller (1860–1929), Czech-American rabbi
- Maxwell Elias Heller (born 1984), American drag queen known as Miz Cracker
- Mervin Heller Jr. (1947–2012), president, United States Tennis Association
- Meshullam Feivush Heller (1740s–1794), Hasidic author
- Michael Heller (law professor), law professor
- Michał Heller (born 1936), Polish philosopher, scientist and priest
- Patricia Heller, American physics educator
- Pete Heller, English electronic and house music producer
- Peter Heller (writer), American author and kayaker
- Rick Heller, American baseball coach
- Robert Heller (magician) (1826–1878), British magician
- Robert Heller (journalist) (1923–2010), British management journalist, consultant and author
- Seligmann Heller (1831–1890), Jewish Bohemian-Austrian poet and journalist
- Stanislav Heller (1924–2000), Czech harpsichordist
- Stephen Heller (1813–1888), Hungarian pianist, composer
- Steven Heller (design writer) (born 1950), American art director and journalist
- Tobias Heller (born 1986), German politician
- Tziporah Heller, Jewish studies educator, author, and speaker
- Uda Heller (born 1951), German politician
- Walter E. Heller (1891–1969), financier
- Will Heller (born 1981), American football player
- Yom-Tov Lipmann Heller (1579–1654), rabbi
- Yosef Heller, American rabbi
- Zoë Heller (born 1965), English journalist and novelist

== See also ==
- Geller (includes Russianised forms)
- Hiller (disambiguation)
