= Lucien Lagrange Architects =

Lucien Lagrange & Associates or Lucien Lagrange Architects is an architecture firm founded by Lucien Lagrange in 1985. The company filed for Chapter 11 bankruptcy in 2010. The company is located at 605 North Michigan Avenue in Chicago, Illinois, and it has approximately sixty employees. The company is owned 100% by Lucien Lagrange. Lagrange is a French-born architect who came to Chicago in 1978 after studying at McGill University and who rose to prominence while working for Skidmore, Owings & Merrill after having been a 1950s high school dropout.

Among the 21st century projects that the firm has completed are The Pinnacle and Park Tower. The firm was responsible for the renovation of the Chicago Landmark Carbide & Carbon Building that had originally been designed by Daniel Burnham's sons to host the originators of the Eveready Battery. The firm has renovated Chicago's Union Station and is currently continuing its series of proposals to expand above the Chicago Landmark. Currently, it pursuing the 26-story Union Station Tower, which has been in various planning stages since 2002. In the past twenty-five years it has been involved in attempted Union Station expansions such as the 55-story One Union Plaza (1989) and the Union Station Towers (1986).

The firm was selected in 2005 as the architect of the St. Regis Hotels & Resorts in Bal Harbour, Florida.

It is the architect for the Lincoln Park 2520 project and the never-built 126 East Chestnut building, which was to have been completed in 2009. It is the architect of the following buildings: Elysian, Chicago (Chicago), Ten East Delaware (Chicago), 535 West End Avenue (New York, New York), River House Condominiums (Grand Rapids, Michigan), and Blue Chip Casino Hotel Tower (Michigan City, Indiana).

The company is described in the real estate industry as one of Chicago's premier residence architects. The firm's reach extends throughout the Chicago metropolitan area, where it is expanding the Blue Chip Casino in Michigan City, Indiana for Boyd Gaming to be the tallest building on Lake Michigan outside of Chicago or Milwaukee, Wisconsin and the third tallest building in Metropolitan Chicago outside of Chicago. The firm is a notable contributor to Chicago Mayor Richard M. Daley.
