= Harvey Geller =

American lyricist

Harvey Geller (June 29, 1922 – March 12, 2009) was lyricist and former vice president and West Coast editor of Cashbox magazine.

During a music career that he began as a song plugger in New York City in the mid-1950s, Geller also worked as a columnist, feature writer, reviewer and sales executive for Billboard magazine and Daily Variety. He served for many years on various selection committees of the National Academy of Recording Arts & Sciences.

As a lyricist, Geller saw his songs recorded by groups such as The Kingston Trio, Brothers Four and River City Ramblers. Among his compositions were "Blue Water Line" and "Charleston Town." He also wrote a few parodies for himself including "Greenstamps" that was to the tune of "Greensleeves."

Born in New York City in 1922, he earned a bachelor's degree in English at New York University and served in the Army during World War II.
