= Park Tower (Chicago) =

Skyscraper in Chicago, Illinois

Coordinates: 41°53′49″N 87°37′31″W

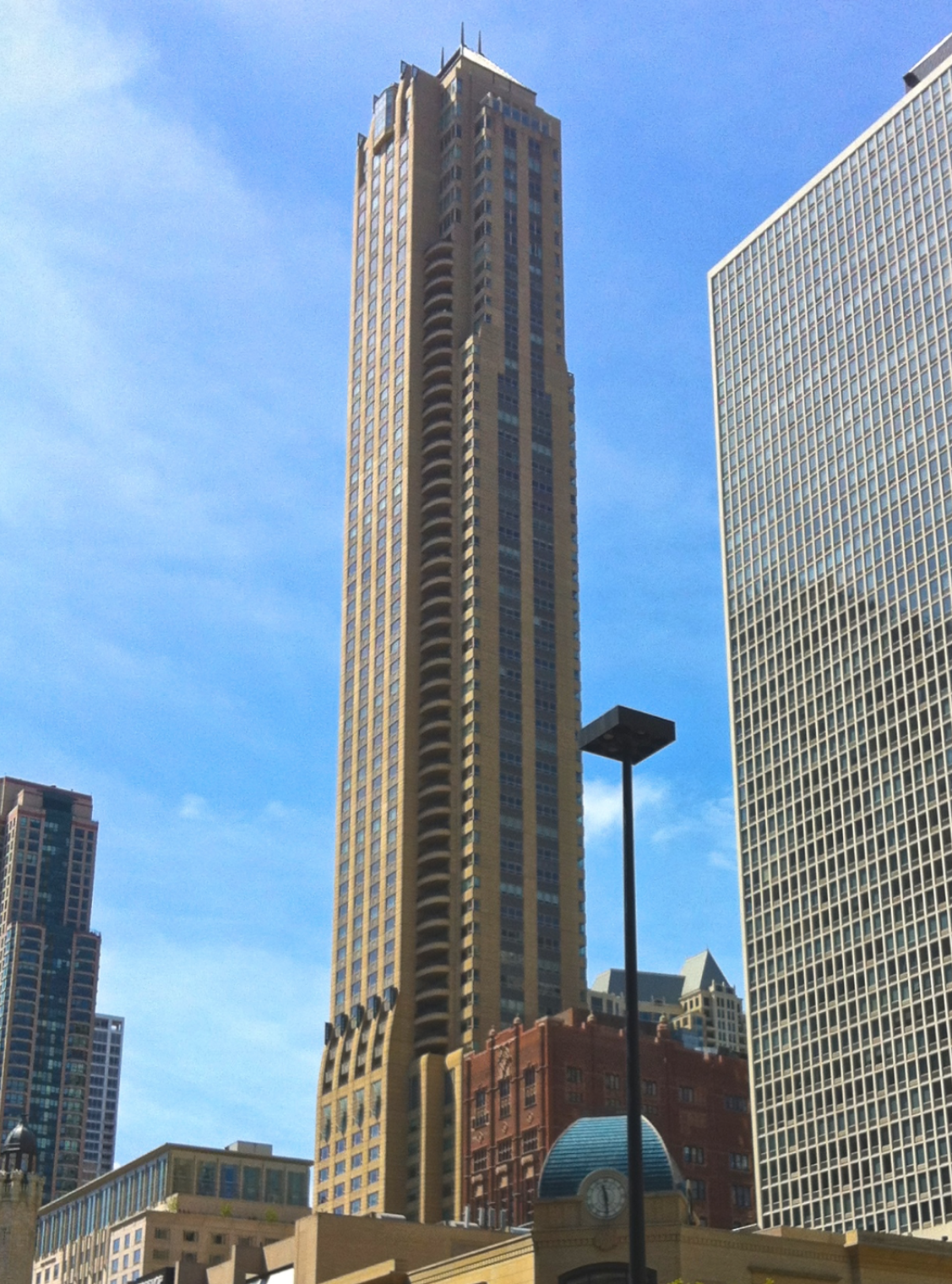
- Park Tower seen from ground level.

- Location within Chicago metropolitan area Location within Illinois Location within the United States

General information
- Status: Completed
- Type: Hotel, Condominium
- Location: Chicago, Illinois, U.S.
- Completed: 2000

Height
- Architectural: 844 feet (257.3 m)

Technical details
- Floor count: 70
- Floor area: 835,624 sq ft (77,632.0 m^{2})

Design and construction
- Architect: Lucien Lagrange Architects

Park Tower is a skyscraper located at 800 North Michigan Avenue in Chicago, Illinois. Completed in 2000 and standing at 844 feet (257 m) tall with 70 floors — 67 floors for practical use, it is the twelfth-tallest building in Chicago, the 43rd-tallest building in the United States, and the 83rd-tallest in the world by architectural detail. It is one of the world's tallest buildings to be clad with architectural precast concrete (the Transamerica Pyramid Building in San Francisco is taller). It is one of the tallest non-steel framed structures in the world—it is a cast-in-place concrete framed structure. This building was originally intended to be 650 ft (200 m) tall. But later, the ceiling heights were increased allowing it to reach 844 ft (257 m).

The building occupies a footprint of 28,000 square feet (2,600 m^{2}). Because of the small footprint and the fact that it is a non-steel-framed concrete building, this is the first building in the US to be designed with a tuned mass damper from the outset. While other skyscrapers in America have anti-sway systems, they were always added later. A tuned mass damper counteracts wind effects on the structure. (The 300-ton damper is a massive steel pendulum hung from four cables inside a square cage.) Because of its massive weight, the damper has inertia that helps stabilize the building from swaying in the wind.

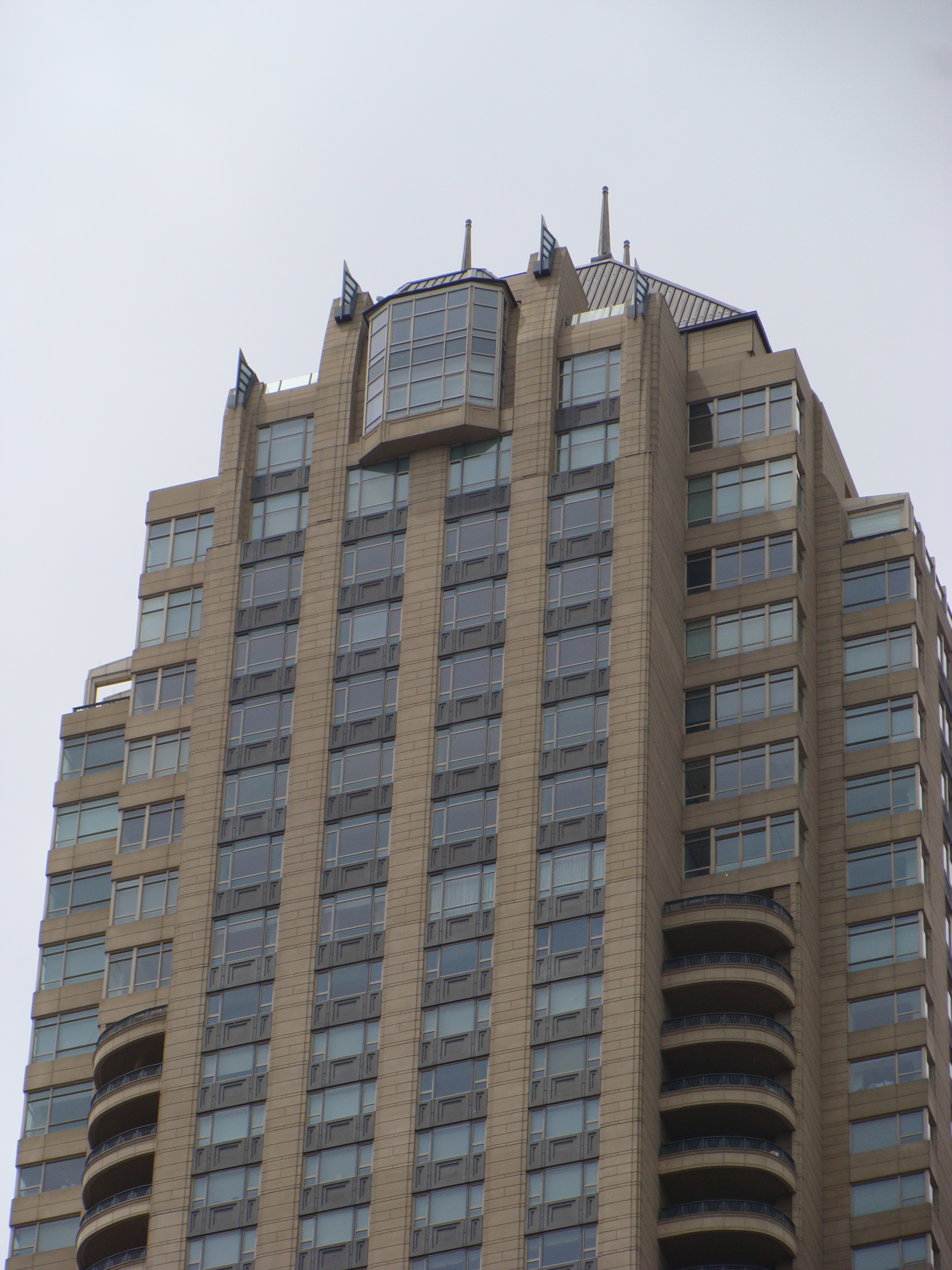
Park Tower rooftop with Art Deco architecture details

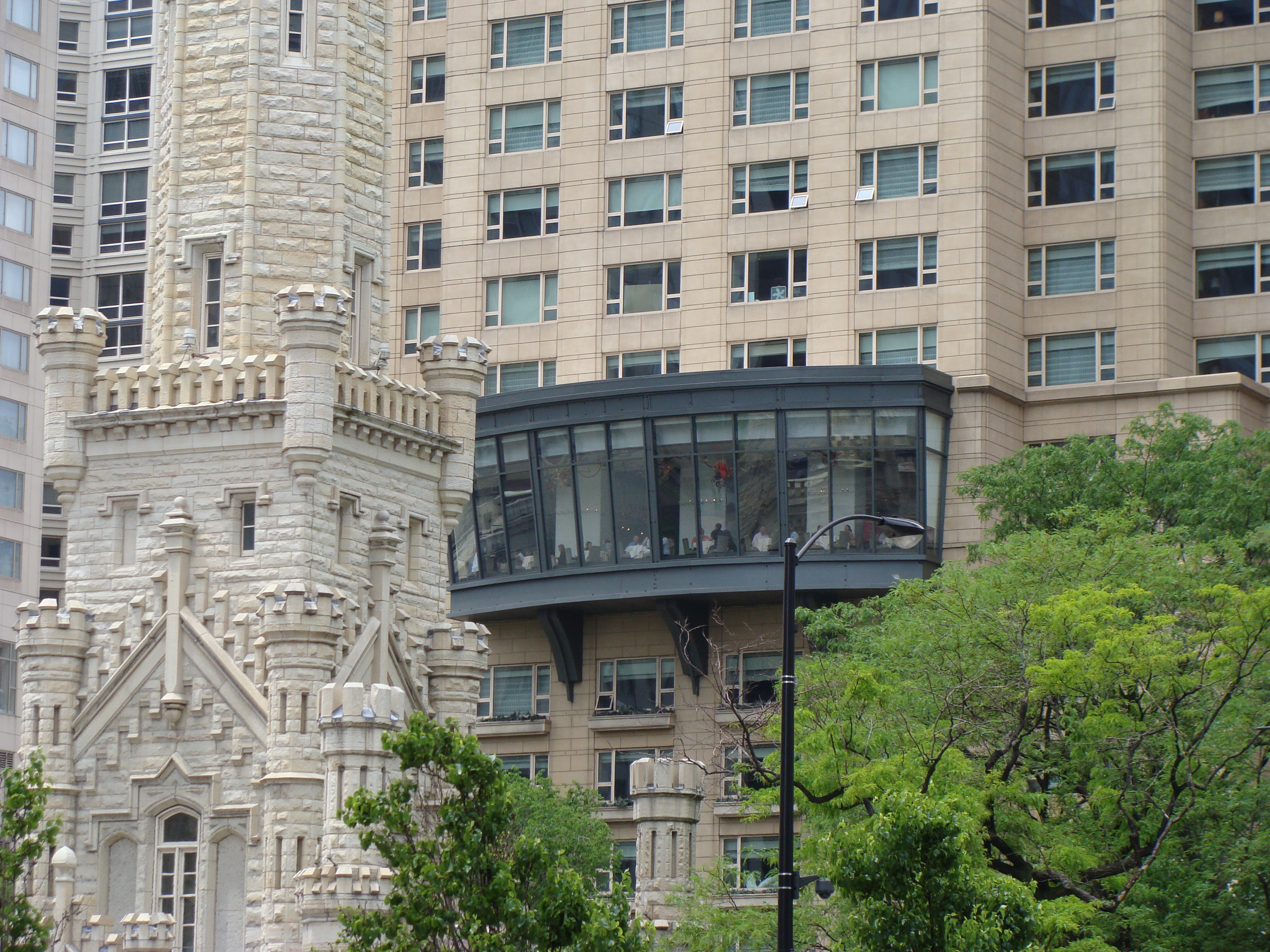
Park Tower detail - the restaurant (NoMi), Chicago Water Tower to the left

Designed by Chicago architectural firm Lucien Lagrange Architects, Park Tower is a mixed-use tower. As the name suggests, the lower portion holds a Park Hyatt Hotel, while the upper levels contain luxury condominiums.

The building contains 193,000 sq ft (17,900 m^{2}) of hotel space (202 rooms), 475,000 sq ft (44,100 m^{2}) of residential space, 20,000 sq ft (1,900 m^{2}) of retail, and 92,000 sq ft (8,500 m^{2}) of parking. Levels 9, 19, and the crown are mechanical areas. Floors 2 to 18 are hotel spaces, Floors 20 to 55 are residential apartments and Floors 56 to 70 are private condominiums. Located at the northern edge of the Magnificent Mile, Park Tower is home to the restaurant NoMi.

== See also ==
- List of buildings
- List of skyscrapers
- List of tallest buildings in Chicago
- List of tallest buildings in the United States
- World's tallest structures
