= Hartmut Heller =

German indigenous rights and anarcho-primitivist activist

- Died: 5 June 2003
- Organization: Freunde der Naturvölker
- Known for: Founding of the FdN and indigenous activism

Hartmut Heller (died 5 June 2003) was a German indigenous rights and anarcho-primitivist activist. He was the founder and first chairman of the Friends of People Close to Nature (fPcN, German: Freunde der Naturvölker, FdN) until his death in 2003.

== Life ==
Heller was from Lauenburg and worked as a nuclear physicist at the GKSS research facility in Geesthacht. Heller claimed that the research facility was home to a reactor, separate from the one in Krümmel, at which an explosion had occurred in 1986 which caused the emission of radiation that lead to an increase in leukemia cases in the area. He claimed that this accident was covered up and that he was given free rein at work in exchange for not speaking about the occurrence publicly. While the position held by Heller continues to circulate and some evidence was found, such an accident has continuously been denied by politicians, calling the accusation "absurd and groundless".

Heller died on 5 June 2003 in a German hospital, having been severely sick with "multiple tropical illnesses" and Malaria. He was buried in the cemetery of Lauenburg.

=== Indigenous activism ===
Heller originally worked for the German Development Service (DED) where he first came into contact with indigenous peoples. He reportedly experienced at the DED that development aid did not always have a positive impact on indigenous peoples and their cultures.

Following his experiences at the DED, Heller became a member of the Society for Threatened Peoples but decided to form his own NGO which laid exclusive focus on the survival of "people close to nature" (German: Naturvölker) and their cultures. This new NGO, the Friends of People Close to Nature (FdN), would be founded by Heller and a small group of supporters on 1 October 1991 in Lauenburg. One of the starting signals for its formation was cited to be the humanitarian disaster experienced by the Aeta people following the Mount Pinatubo eruption in June 1991, about which the newly founded FdN helped spread awareness in Germany as well as making an effort to buy land for the Aetas to resettle to.

Between 1978 and 2000, Heller frequently visited the Hadzabe peoples, almost every year during the '90s. He worked closely with the Hadzabe to document and study their culture as well as to vehemently defend the Hadzabes' traditional lifestyle and ancestral lands. Upon the forceful relocation of Hadzabe children to boarding schools after the introduction of compulsory schooling in Tanzania during the 1980s, Heller would to reunite the children with their families; this would lead to Hadzabe children being exempt from compulsory schooling. Heller additionally worked on the documentary Hadzabe – Kein Bedarf nach Entwicklung, which was published in 2012, after Heller's death.

Heller was especially interested in raising awareness for the Negrito peoples of southeast Asia, particularly in the Philippines.

Heller was close friends with Bernd Wegener, a later chairman of the FdN, who Heller helped join the organization in 1995.

=== Ideology ===
Heller was a self-described anarchist and, at times, also called his organization anarchist. He rejected all forms of hierarchy and argued that primitive peoples lived an ideal and naturally anarchist lifestyle that he sought to emulate; "polygamous and without clothes or money". Like other anarcho-primitivists, Heller opposed civilization, and in particular its introduction to indigenous peoples; but recognized that he himself had to use its means in order to advance his goals.

Commenting on values and morality, Heller said he had made an effort to remove himself from the western perception thereof and the society he had grown up in. Instead, he said, one "has to choose one or the other, the values of the industrialized world, or those of the naturalistic peoples." as they could not be combined. He criticized that naturalistic humans around the world are "brutalized" under a "european-occidental system" (German: europäisch-abendländisches System) that takes humans their freedom to live in accordance with nature.

According to a recounted conversation in which Heller was jokingly confronted: "Hartmut, when I hear you talking like this, I sometimes start to think you would like to just bomb humanity back to the stone age.", to which he was quoted as having replied:

"Yes, that's exactly what I want. That's exactly what it's all about! Our civilization is already dead; it is built only on money and oppression. There's nothing alive about it anymore. We have to go back to the life of the savages."

In 1998, Heller commented on an experience he had made in Tanzania while visiting the Hadzabe peoples, who had just received a donation of used clothes. He was quoted as saying:

"When I got there I could hardly believe my eyes. At that time there were still people who wore the usual fur clothing that barely covered the body. But now they were walking around in ruffle nightwear, lace panties, and brassieres; a "helpful" donation was recently delivered. The sight that presented itself to me was grotesque and sad at the same time."

In 2001, Heller traveled to Cambodia for research on the ancient Negrito peoples of the area but shifted the focus of his trip due to the regions being inaccessible because of the remaining landmines. The new focus of his trip was thus shifted to educating himself about the former Khmer Rouge, which he concluded by sympathizing with the regime, saying: "Pol Pot and the red Khmer had visions and goals very similar to mine. [...]"; going on to elaborate that he saw in the Khmer Rouge a regime which sought to return to a society free from oppression, money, and industry. He praised, in a 7-point-list, supposed achievements of the Khmer Rouge which he viewed as positive, those being the following:

"1. They brought down the parasitic city juggernaut Pnom Phen by reducing the population from several hundred thousand to under 30,000.

2. They achieved that people should only eat what they actually grew and produced themselves.

3. They destroyed big industry.

4. They finally abolished money so that fairer barter could take place again.

5. They destroyed many of the monasteries, and imprisoned child monks for life.

6. They let the road system deteriorate. In doing so, they prevented domination, even by themselves.

7. They demolished the famous ancient temple complex Angkor Wat, symbol and evidence of a brutal, hierarchical and nature-contemptuous exploitative society."

Heller strongly condemned the United States and its influences on the world, referring to it as the "US-Killer Society" (German: US-Killergesellschaft). Heller blamed the United States for the destruction of "savage peoples", the murder of children in Iraq, and the defamation of the "mostly anarchistic way of life in Somalia" as well as the politics of Fidel Castro. In the context of the Khmer Rouge, Heller criticized the apparent hypocrisy in the touristic and political instrumentation of the Killing-Fields, blaming the United States for atrocities that killed way more, particularly native, people. Heller saw at the core of both American liberal democracy and German "Hitler-Democracy" (German: Hitlerdemokratie) the values of progress and development, which he vehemently opposed.

Heller strongly opposed missionary work, believing that Christianity harmed the culture of indigenous peoples. In one instance, he is quoted as saying: "They [the missionaries] are taking their culture and force their Jesus-faith onto them."

On racism, Heller described himself as a racist, saying that racism is natural and widely practiced by "savage peoples", leading him to criticize other anarchists for rejecting racism. Additionally he commented: "We as Friends of People Close to Nature, anarchist peoples close to nature, should respect our friends in all their differences." Heller also criticized multiculturalism as a "global mishmash" and viewed the idea that one could move and live wherever they wished, which he saw as being propagated by other anarchists, as dangerous to "savage tribal peoples" as he feared that it would bring them "destructive democracy", "human rights of the civilized", women's rights movements, and "instructions in dealing with other peoples"; saying: "They are racists, they don't want mixing. [...] all primitive and savage peoples [...] only want one thing: their tribal territories." He also criticized condemnation over the usage of words such as "Race" and "Neger", which led to his expulsion from an anarchist event.

Heller was quoted as condemning homosexuality as a "perversity" and believing that "[...] world Jewry presents a huge danger to the entire world."

Reportedly, Heller held contact with some esoteric groups in Germany, most notably ZEGG.

== Selected publications ==
- Negritos – das leise Sterben der kleinen Menschen des Waldes, 1995

== Literature ==
- Nordhausen, Frank and Garve, Roland. (2009). Laleo - die geraubte Steinzeit: als Zahnarzt bei den letzten Naturvölkern. Ch. Links Verlag. ISBN 978-3861535461
