= Laurence S. Geller =

Laurence Stephen Geller CBE
- Born: November 1947 (age 78); London, England
- Status: Divorced
- Education: Ealing Technical College
- Occupations: Businessman, author, philanthropist
- Employer: Geller Capital Partners
- Title: Chairman
- Children: 3
- Parent(s): Harold Geller; Emme Geller

Laurence Stephen Geller, CBE, (born November 1947) is a British-American real estate investor, author and philanthropist. He served as the founder, president and chief executive officer of Strategic Hotels & Resorts from 1997 to 2012. He is the chancellor of the University of West London and the Chairman of Geller Capital Partners.

== Early life ==
Laurence Geller was born in November 1947 in London. His father, Harold Geller, was a conductor at the Royal Philharmonic Orchestra.

Geller played rugby at school, but dropped out at 15. He subsequently graduated from the school of hotel management and catering at Ealing Technical College, now known as the University of West London. During the Six-Day War of 1967, he served in the Israel Defense Forces.

== Career ==
Geller started his career as a "hotel busboy" in Switzerland at the age of 15. He emigrated to the United States in 1976, where he first worked for Holiday Inns, eventually serving as its Executive Vice President and Senior Vice President. He subsequently served as the Chief Operating Officer of Hyatt Development Corporation.

Geller founded Geller & Co., a hotel and gaming company, in 1989. He served as its chairman and chief executive officer from 1989 to 1997. He also served on the board of directors of the Grand Metropolitan.

Geller founded Strategic Hotels & Resorts in 1997. He served as its president and chief executive officer until 2012.

Geller serves as the chairman of Geller Capital Partners. With a Chinese investor, he acquired the Waldorf Astoria Chicago from Sam Zell in 2015.

Geller served as the chairman of the Chairman of the Industry Real Estate Financing Advisory Council of the American Hotel and Lodging Association, and as the chairman of the Commercial and Retail Council of the Urban Land Institute. He also served on the board of the Chicago Convention & Tourism Bureau. He served on the board of directors of Gaylord Entertainment from 2002 to 2006.

Geller is the author of two thrillers about hotels, Do Not Disturb and The Last Resort.

In 2019, Laurence Geller began building 5-star care residences and plowing funding into dementia care research and nurse training.

== Philanthropy ==
Geller served on the board of the Children's Memorial Hospital in Chicago. He also served on the National Leadership Council of the American Jewish Committee. He has served as the chairman of the board of trustees of The International Churchill Society (formerly the Churchill Centre) since January 2007.

Geller was appointed as the Chancellor of his alma mater, the University of West London, in May 2011. On December 31, 2011, he became a Commander of the Order of the British Empire.

In 2015, Geller donated US$1 million, or £650,000, to Bloomsbury Publishing to make the papers of former British Prime Minister Winston Churchill available to schoolchildren.

== Personal life ==
Geller was married for forty years until he divorced circa 2012. They resided in Lincoln Park, Chicago. He has three grown children.

In 2024 he donated £45,000 to the Conservatives.

== Works ==
- Geller, Laurence (2006). Do Not Disturb. Los Angeles, California: Volt Press. ISBN 9781566253000. OCLC 69331406.
- Geller, Laurence (2012). The Last Resort. New York: Chaucer Press. ISBN 9781884092848. OCLC 785870530.
