= Mervin Heller Jr. =

Mervin Andrew Heller Jr. (June 10, 1947 - August 21, 2012) was a president of the United States Tennis Association and completed his tenure in 2002. He began with the USTA in 1974 as President of the Lehigh Valley District Tennis Association. In 1991, he was first elected to the USTA Board of Directors, serving as its Secretary/Treasurer in 1993-1994. Then, in 1999, he became Vice President.

Heller was involved in various functions of the USTA. He was Chairman of the Strategic Planning Committee, the Individual Membership Committee and Constitution and Rules Committee. He was also a member of the Nominating Committee, Budget and Finance Committee, Long-Range Planning Committee and Executive Committee.

Heller was a President, Vice President and Section Delegate of USTA Middles States Section. He was given the USTA Middle States Mangen Award for service to Middle States tennis in 1991. In 1998, Heller was inducted into the USTA Middle States Hall of Fame.

In 1992, Heller established the Berks County Tennis Association (BCTA), a community tennis association serving his hometown of Reading, PA, as well as the surrounding communities. In 1999, the Reading Eagle-Times newspaper recognized him as one of the 50 most influential sports figures over the past 50 years in Berks County, Pennsylvania

Heller graduated from East Stroudsburg State University (ESU). He played on the school's tennis team and went undefeated in conferences matches for his entire four years. Upon graduation, he held the school record for career wins in singles and doubles. In 1990, Heller was inducted into the ESU Athletic Hall of Fame. In 2010, Heller was recognized by his alma mater with the Helen G. Brown Award. This award is presented by the ESU Alumni Association to its most notable and successful alumni for their lifelong accomplishments. Heller went on to receive his law degree from the University of Pittsburgh School of Law and currently was partner in the law firm of Leisawitz Heller Abramowitch Phillips, P.C.

Heller served for over ten years on the Board of Directors and as legal counsel for the Berks County Chamber of Commerce which has a membership of over 2,100 businesses in Berks County. He was a Chairman, and Finance Chairman, of the Berks County Republican Party.

Heller, 65, died from cancer on Tuesday, August 21, 2012.

In 2014, the Berks County Tennis Association named the Merv Heller Memorial Scholarship in Merv's honor, awarding a $1,000 scholarship to one male and one female high school senior that has shown outstanding qualities on the court, in the classroom and in the community. The annual award is presented at the Berks County Tennis Night of Champions Dinner and Awards ceremony, held each June at the Hits for Hope Tennis Tournament.
