= Heller (album) =

Studio album by Heller
- Released: 1989 (Ghost House)
- Genre: Thrash metal Speed metal
- Length: 36:00
- Label: Ghost House Records, Rock Express Records
- Producer: Atila Milojković

Heller chronology
Heller (1989)	Demo Tape (1993)

CD reissue cover

Professional ratings
Review scores
Source	Rating
The Corroseum	(favorable) link

Heller is the debut and the only studio album from former Yugoslav and Serbian thrash metal band Heller. The album was originally released in 1989 by Ghost House Records. In 2003 the album was reissued on CD by Rock Express Records. 2003 release featured four bonus tracks from Heller's 1993 demo. The album cover art was designed by the band's bass guitarist Dejan "Čvora" Čvorović.

== Track listing ==
1. "Inferno" – 3:41
2. "Armageddon" – 2:23
3. "Inverzija" – 2:59
4. "Demonska devojka" – 4:30
5. "Grob bez dna" - 2:13
6. "Dead or Alive" – 3:25
7. "Krvava osveta" – 4:24
8. "Adam i Eva" – 0:11
9. "Varvarska horda" – 4:23
10. "Inkvizicija" – 3:08
11. "Heller" – 4:43

=== 2003 reissue bonus tracks ===
12. "Destiny" - 4:28
13. "Trash" – 2:50
14. "H.W.I.B." – 1:16
15. "RR" – 3:08

== Personnel ==
- Žmegi - vocals
- Atila - guitar
- Dane - guitar
- Čvora - bass guitar
- Müller - drums
