= Heller (band) =

Serbian thrash metal band

Background information
- Origin: Belgrade, Serbia, Yugoslavia
- Genres: Thrash metal
- Years active: 1984–1993, 2013–2018
- Labels: Ghost House, Take It or Leave It, Rock Express
- Members: Attila Milojković; Dejan Čvorović; Senad Prašović; Zoran Dankov; Hogar
- Past members: Kosta Bogdanović; Zoran Miladinović; Darko Smukov; Zoran Dankov; Saša Đaković; Duče; Žare

Heller is a Serbian and former Yugoslav thrash metal band from Belgrade, notable as one of the first Yugoslav thrash metal bands and one of the pioneers of former Yugoslav extreme metal. The band's debut self-titled album is arguably the first extreme metal album in former Yugoslavia, and one of the first of the kind in Southeastern Europe.

== History ==
=== 1984–1993 ===
The band was formed in 1985 by Attila Milojković (guitar, vocals) and Kosta Bogdanović "Kole" (solo guitar), with Zoran Miladinović "Deda" (bass guitar) and Saša Đaković "Müller" (drums). During the following year, the band had their first larger appearances at the Hit 202 held at the Belgrade Dom Omladine, with the band Dr. Steel from Rijeka, and the Belgrade Heavy Metal Festival, with the popular bands of the time, Legija from Zagreb, Crna Udovica from Dubrovnik and Ruska Zima from Belgrade. The lineup also recorded a live demo recording, made at a performance in Zemun, featuring the songs "Dead or Alive", "Armageddon" and "Heller", which were broadcast on the national Radio 202.

The following year, Miladinović and Milojković went to serve the Yugoslav People's Army, but Milojković was discharged from the army after a month, so the band kept on working with a new bassist Dejan Čvorović "Čvora". In the meantime, Bogdanović left the band, later working with Amnesia and forming the band Rapidforce, being replaced by guitarist Darko Smukov "Dare", later a Brainstorm and Sick Mother Fakers member, only to be replaced by the guitarist Zoran Dankov "Dane". The lineup also recorded their first demo recording, featuring the material written in English and consisting of four live recorded tracks. The following year, in 1988, the singer Senad Prašović "Žmegi" came to the band, and Attila assumed only the guitar playing duty.

In 1989, the band released their first and only album through the Odžaci label Ghost House Records. Heller, released in April, featuring eleven tracks, including one instrumental composition. The album was produced and arranged by Milojković and all tracks were written by Milojković and Čvorović. The lyrics for all tracks, except for "Dead or Alive" were written in Serbian language. The album was released in 500 copies only and is today a rarity and a collector's item. It is arguably the first Yugoslav thrash metal record, and extreme metal in general, and one of the first releases of the kind in South-Eastern Europe. During the same year, the band also performed as an opening act for the German band Destruction in Zagreb and Ljubljana.

In 1993, the band recorded a demo recording, prosaically called Demo Tape, released on compact cassette only by Take It Or Leave It Records, featuring seven tracks, including one recorded live. After the demo release, the band ceased to exist.

=== Post-breakup ===
In 2003, Rock Express Records released a CD reissue of the self-titled album, featuring four bonus tracks, "Destiny", "Trash", "H.W.I.B." and "RR", released on the first demo recording.

In 2013, the band reunited, in the lineup that featured Attila Milojković and Zoran Dankov on guitar, Senad Prašović on vocals, Dejan Čvorović on bass guitar and one new member, drummer Hogar. The band had their reunion concert on Vračar Rocks festival, on 17 January 2014 in Božidarac club in Belgrade. The band is announced to perform at the 2014 EXIT festival.

== Discography ==
=== Studio albums ===
- Heller (1989)

=== Official demo recordings ===
- Demo Tape (1993)
