= Waldorf Astoria Chicago =

Building in Chicago, Illinois

Coordinates: 41°53′59″N 87°37′39″W

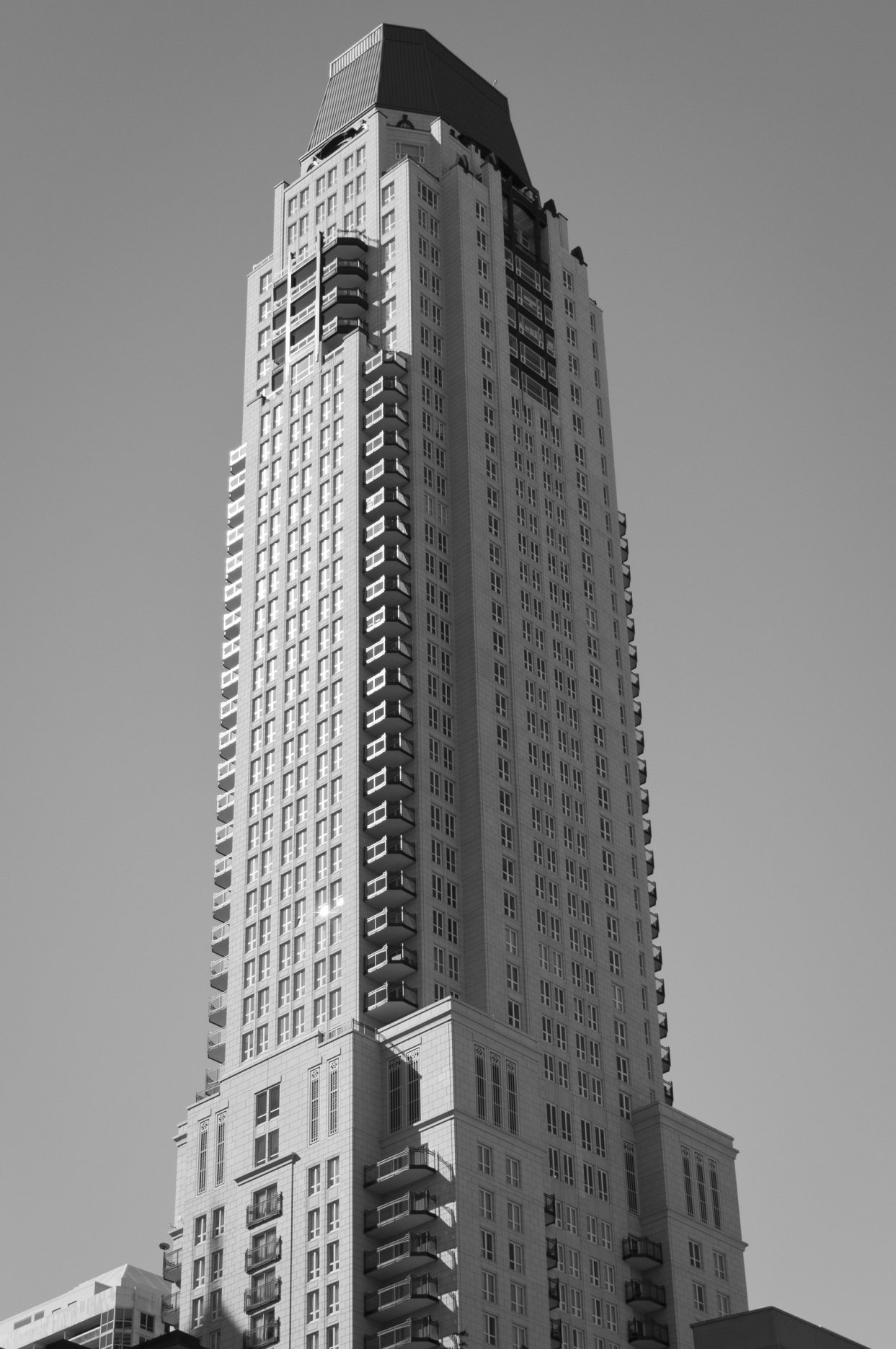
- The building in 2010
- Interactive map of the Waldorf Astoria Chicago area
- Hotel chain: Waldorf Astoria

General information
- Type: Mixed
- Location: Chicago, Illinois
- Construction started: 2006
- Completed: 2010
- Management: Hilton Worldwide

Height
- Roof: 686 ft (209 m)

Technical details
- Floor count: 60

Design and construction
- Architect: Lucien Lagrange Architects
- Developer: Elysian Development
- Structural engineer: Halvorson and Partners

The Waldorf Astoria Chicago, formerly the Elysian Hotel Chicago, is a luxury hotel located at 11 East Walton Street in the Gold Coast area of Chicago, Illinois.

== History ==
Originally developed as The Elysian, the project was approved in June 2005; its construction took place from 2006 until 2009. The 60 story hotel was designed by Chicago architect Lucien Lagrange and was developed by David Pisor. The project consists of two main parts: a 188-room hotel and 51 condominiums above (estimated at $280 million combined). In 2009, the condominiums were valued between $2.5 and $8.5 million.

The hotel opened in February 2009. In keeping with the tradition of the Gold Coast neighborhood, the entrance of the project is a cobblestone courtyard. Its design emulates the grand hotels of Paris in the 1920s, complete with colonnades, spires, and a motor court.

The hotel was reported to have failed to make a profit in its first two years and in September 2011, it was announced that its owner, Jones Lang LaSalle, was looking to sell after Pisor's equity partner chose to remove itself from the hotel business, rather than developing the Elysian into a hotel brand as had been originally envisioned.

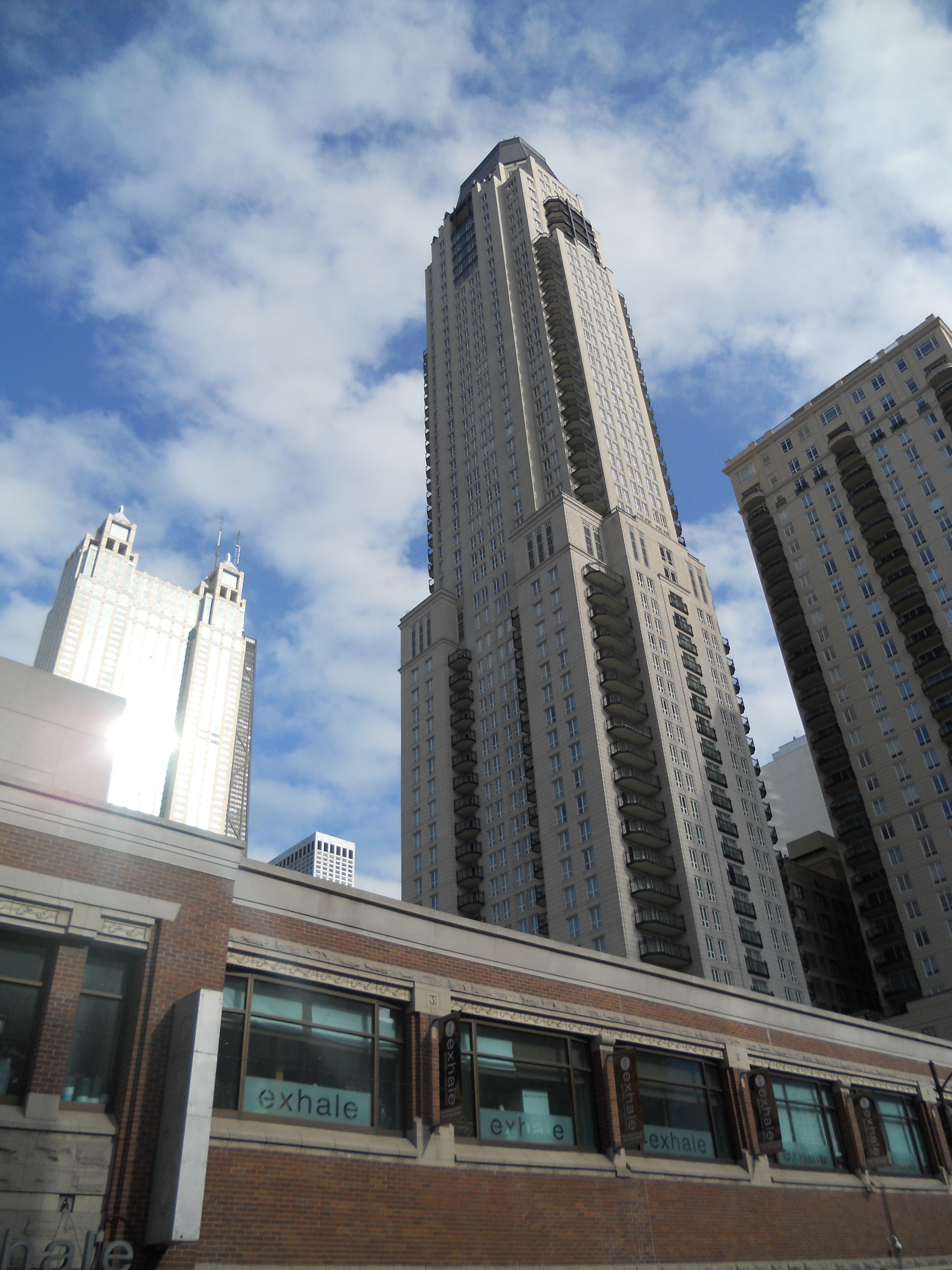
Waldorf Astoria Tower in 2015

By November 2011, it was announced that an investment group and Hilton Hotels would be purchasing the Elysian and converting it to a Waldorf Astoria. A Waldorf Astoria had been planned as part of an international expansion in 2007, but failed to take off due to the economy in 2008. Although a sales price was not disclosed, it is believed that it was purchased for $95 million, which would put it at a per room price of $505,000.

It was renamed the Waldorf Astoria Chicago on February 1, 2012, although nearly all of the hotel remained the same.

In June 2015, it was reported that Sam Zell of Equity Group Investments had reached an agreement to sell the hotel for $113 million to a group led by hotel investor Laurence Geller (who previously founded Strategic Hotels & Resorts) and including the real estate arm of Chinese manufacturer Wanxiang Group.

== Awards and honors ==
As Elysian Hotel Chicago, it was named Condé Nast Traveler's top hotel in the United States in 2011.

It ranked first in the Travel + Leisure 2012 World's Best Awards readers' survey and is a 2013 TripAdvisor Certificate of Excellence Award recipient.

== Location ==
The Waldorf Astoria Chicago is located in the Gold Coast, a district that is listed on the National Register of Historic Places. It is also close to Oak Street, which is known for its boutiques, high end jewelry stores, and spas, as well as State Street and Rush Street. The latter is known for its night life.

Its street level retail tenants are Marc Jacobs and Saint Laurent.

== See also ==
- List of tallest buildings in Chicago
