= Harold Geller =

Australian-American conductor and composer (1916–2005)

- Born: Harold Isaac Geller; February 23, 1916; Sydney, Australia
- Died: February 27, 2005 (aged 89); Las Vegas, Nevada, U.S.
- Resting place: King David Memorial Chapel and Cemetery, Las Vegas, Nevada, U.S.
- Occupations: Conductor, composer
- Spouse: Ruth Geller
- Children: Laurence Geller and 1 daughter

Harold Geller (1916–2005) was an Australian-American conductor and composer.

== Early life ==
Harold Geller was born on February 23, 1916, in Sydney, Australia.

== Career ==
Geller was a conductor for the Royal Philharmonic Orchestra in London. He subsequently composed music for films like Trio, Jungle Street, Fury at Smugglers' Bay and The Mistress. His music was also featured in Velvet, a Spanish television series, in 2014–2015. Harold Geller spent most of his career in Great Britain, giving hundreds of broadcasts for the BBC with his fourteen-piece orchestra in programmes such as 'Music While You Work' and 'Morning Music'. He composed many light orchestral pieces as well as a concerto for mandolin and orchestra featuring Hugo D'Alton (one of Britain's top mandolin players). He recorded an album conducting the Royal Philharmonic Orchestra entitled "Play For You" for Pye Records. During the 1970s, he worked for Chappell Music Publishers in London as a promotion man for their music and song catalogue.

== Personal life ==
With his wife Ruth, Geller has a son, Laurence Geller, who is a real estate investor, author and philanthropist, and a daughter, Roslynn Marre. They resided in Las Vegas, Nevada. Geller became a Freemason.

== Death ==
Geller died on February 27, 2005, in Las Vegas, Nevada.
