= Richard Geller (meditation instructor) =

President of Boston-based MedWorks Corporate Meditation Programs

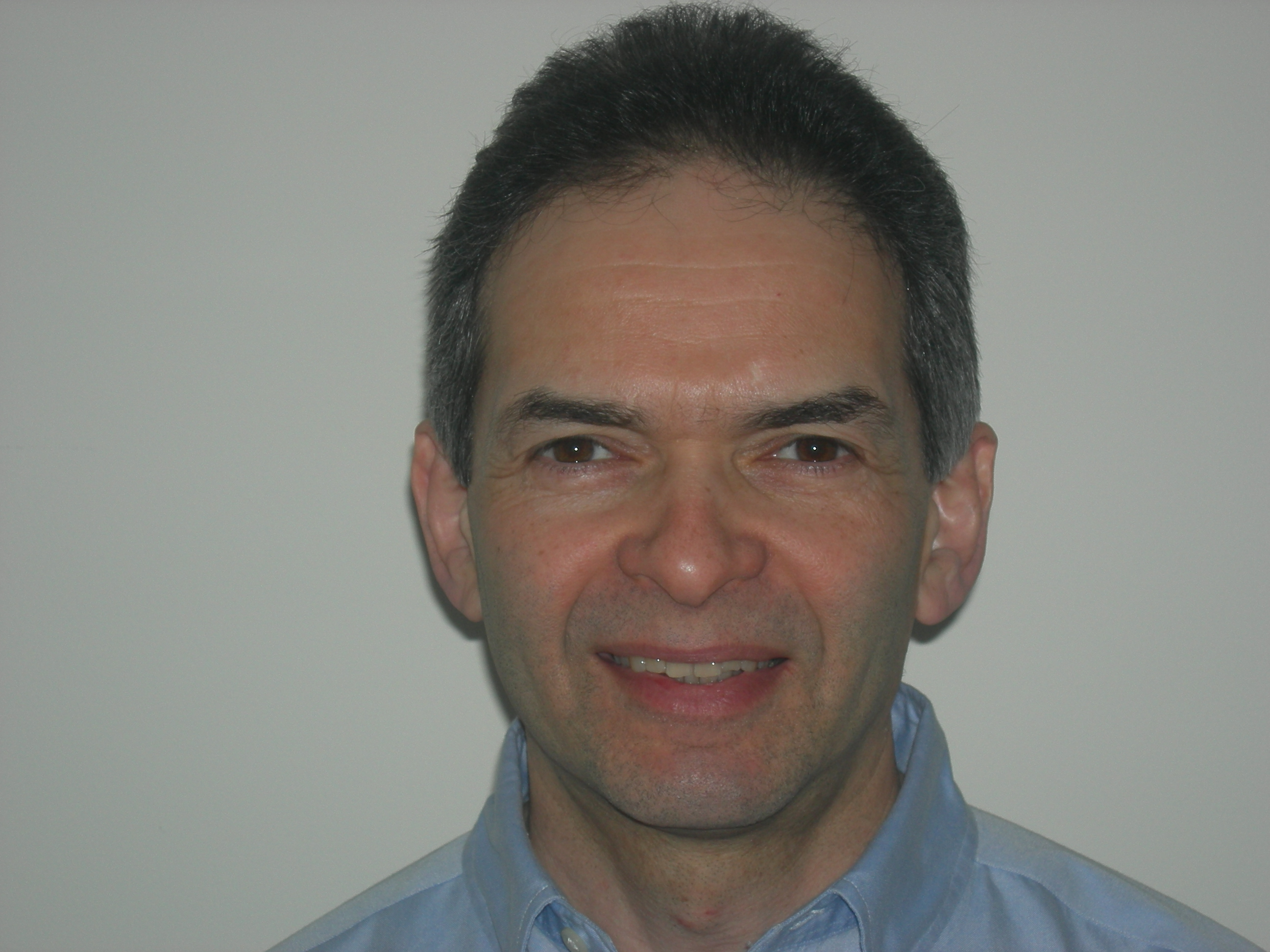
- Richard Geller, March 2007
- Occupation: President of MedWorks Corporate Meditation Programs
- Website: www.meditationprograms.com

Richard Geller (born 1952) is a meditation instructor, also known as the founder and president of MedWorks Corporate Meditation Programs based in Boston, Massachusetts, United States.

== History ==
Richard Geller is also known for his work as a volunteer teaching meditation at the county jail in Boston.
