= Max Geller (activist) =

American activist (born 1984)

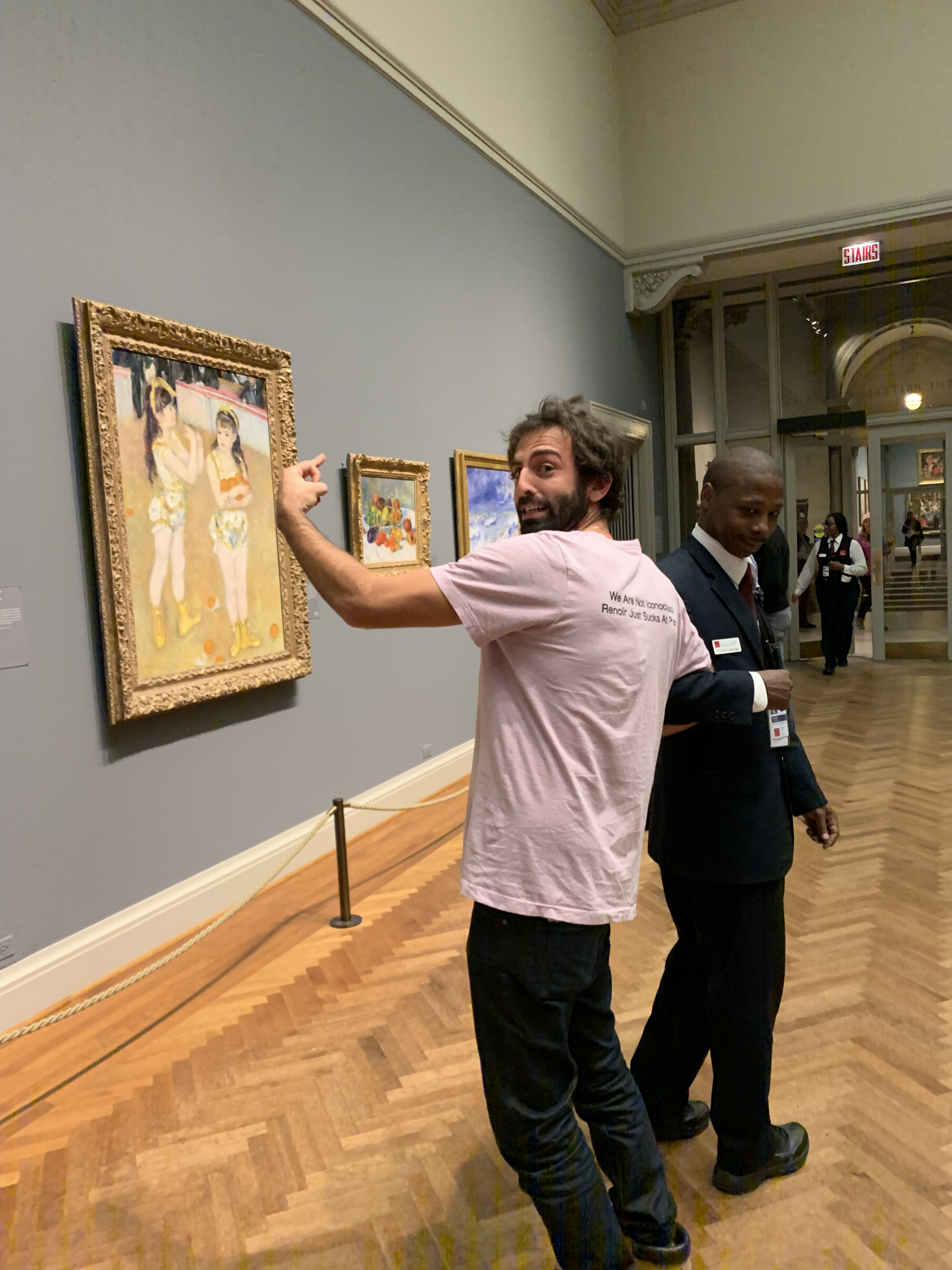
- Geller in 2019, flipping off a Renoir while being physically removed by museum security.
- Born: 1984 (age 41–42)
- Education: Colorado College

Max Geller (born 1984) is an American performance artist and activist. Part of the Jewish left, Geller is an organizer and activist for Palestinian human rights, including the Boycott, Divestment and Sanctions movement (BDS). Geller is the founder of Renoir Sucks At Painting, a "trolling" social movement to remove the paintings of Pierre-Auguste Renoir from museums around the world. He has leveraged the Renoir Sucks at Painting project into media coverage for the BDS movement and other social causes.

== Early life and education ==
Geller grew up in Massachusetts, where his family participated in the secular Workmen's Circle community and where he celebrated his Bar Mitzvah. He attended The Cambridge School of Weston and Colorado College, where he played Ultimate Frisbee.

While in college, Geller and a friend conned their way into an appearance on the television arbitration show Judge Mathis, which aired in 2005. Geller wrote a script for their disagreement, which the show presented at face value. Geller's experiences as a boat captain were broadcast on This American Life.

== Anti-Zionist activism ==
Geller has said that he became an activist during the 2003 invasion of Iraq and began questioning Zionism because of George W. Bush's support for the State of Israel. He traveled to Israel with Birthright Israel in 2006. Geller has been a member of many groups organizing on behalf of Palestinian liberation, such as Students for Justice in Palestine (SJP), International Jewish Anti-Zionist Network (IJAN), Jewish Voice for Peace (JVP), Palestine Action, and the New Orleans Palestinian Solidarity Committee (NOPSC) and he has been a frequent contributor to a variety of conferences and journals. He has also presented at a conference of the U.S. Campaign to End the Israeli Occupation, now the US Campaign for Palestinian Rights.

=== Students for Justice in Palestine ===
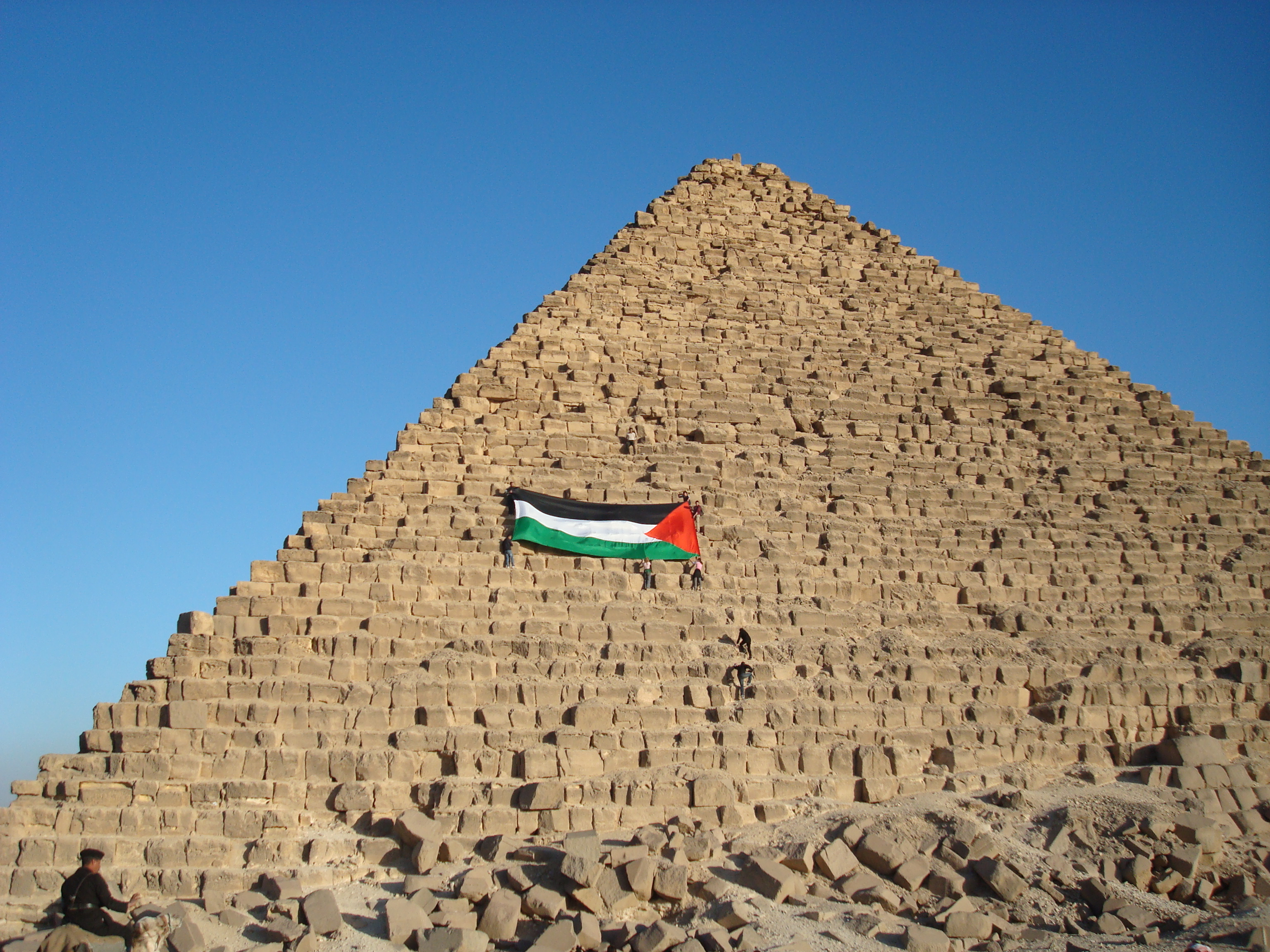
A Palestinian flag presented on the Temple of Giza, a 2009 stunt which Geller claims to have been a part of.

While Geller was a student at Northeastern Law School, he was president of the local chapter of Students for Justice in Palestine (SJP). In 2013, the group staged a walkout of a presentation by Israeli soldiers, leading the school to put them on administrative probation. SJP then delivered mock eviction letters to students, which resulted in the group's suspension. Geller defended the incident in an op-ed in the Boston Globe and an appearance on Democracy Now!. Geller told Chris Hedges that his SJP activism led to death threats and threats of disciplinary measures, which further catalyzed his activism.

=== New Orleans City Council Israel protest bill ===
In 2017, Geller was involved with the New Orleans Palestinian Solidarity Committee (NOPSC), which lobbied the New Orleans City Council to pass a Boycott Divestment and Sanctions bill that they helped draft. The bill passed, but was met with counter-lobbying by Zionist groups. The wording of the bill had not explicitly named Israel, opting instead to target "human-rights violators," but was nonetheless called anti-Israel and anti-Semitic. The city council claimed they were unaware of NOPSC's political stances and rescinded the bill.

=== Palestine Action ===
Geller is a former spokesperson for Palestine Action, an activist group which organizes direction action to protest Israeli-owned weapons company Elbit Systems. The goal of these direct action tactics is to prevent their manufacture of military technologies. He left the group in 2025.

== Campaign against Renoir ==
Geller has organized a satirical campaign, Renoir Sucks At Painting (RSAP), against the artist Pierre-Auguste Renoir since 2015, both online and through various protests. The campaign challenges Eurocentrism and demands that museums remove Renoir paintings from display, and show more work by women and artists of color; Geller says that Renoir is his focus because "if the problems with Eurocentricity were personified in a man, Renoir would be the disgusting" embodiment. RSAP has received coverage from a range out outlets including The New York Times, The New Yorker, The Guardian, Le Monde (France), The Forward, El País (Spain), Folha de S.Paulo (Brazil) and Frankfurter Allgemeine Zeitung (Germany). He has said that he was both "thrilled and alarmed by how serious people are taking this."

According to WBUR-FM, the campaign began after Geller visited the Barnes Foundation, which reportedly holds the largest Renoir collection in the world. Part of his criticism is aesthetic: "When you look at a Renoir painting," Geller said, "you feel nothing at all. It's just so unnourishing." However, Geller also criticizes Renoir because of the painter's well known Antisemitism. Geller also hoped to make larger critiques of money in the art world, including the role risk-averse curators and wealthy museum trustees play in choosing the art people see. He also believes that investors use collecting art as a way to whitewash of their controversial business decisions.

In April 2015, Geller started the Instagram account and began posting images of paintings by Renoir, with captions criticizing both the artist and the institutions that hang his art. In May 2015, Renoir's great-great-granddaughter responded to one of the Instagram posts, entering into an argument with Geller, writing, "When your great-great-grandfather paints anything worth $78.1 million, then you can criticize. In the meantime, it is safe to say that the free market has spoken and Renoir did NOT suck at painting."

=== Museum protests ===
On October 5, 2015, Geller organized a two-hour anti-Renoir protest outside the Museum of Fine Arts Boston. At the event, Geller led protestors in chants like "Other art is worth your while, Renoir paints a steaming pile." Protest signs read "God Hates Renoir," "Treacle Harms Society," "Aesthetic Terrorism," and "#rotting vegetation." The art publication Hyperallergic covered the protest, reporting that plainclothes museum guards and Boston Police officers observed the protest. Also present were a handful of counter-protestors, who held signs saying "You couldn't do BETTER," "You can take our Renoir when you pry them from our cold dead hands," and "Je suis Pierre-Auguste." One visitor yelled that Geller and the other protestors were "Nazis." Geller and the protestors then briefly entered the museum, where Geller told a staff member that he would not donate "until the Met addressed "the Renoir situation."

The protest garnered mild criticism in the Boston Globe by Sebastian Smee, who called the protest "sophomoric" but concedes that Renoir is "an artist I detest most of the time. Such a syrupy, falsified take on reality." Geller responded by publicly challenging Smee to a duel. (A reporter for HuffPost noted that dueling is illegal in Massachusetts.) The feud gained media attention, especially after a second protest outside the Metropolitan Museum of New York. Geller also clashed with New York critic and art historian Jerry Saltz.

Geller continued to organize anti-Renoir protests at art museums in major cities around the country. After a protest at the Art Institute of Chicago, Geller was a guest on WGN-TV where he expanded the focus of his movement from Renoir's paintings themselves to the misogyny and white supremacy of the canon at large. "At the end of the day," he said, "it's about access, who has access to our museums... I think the Art Institute should sell some of these Renoirs...and instead buy some art that is painted by women or people of colour."

Writer Kriston Capps contexualized hating Renoir in The Atlantic, writing that the painter's contemporaries also complained that Renoir, like other Impressonists, "was promiscuous with color [and] he paid no heed to line and composition." In 1874, Albert Wolff (journalist) wrote in Le Figaro that Renoir's use of color and composition bordered on obscene: "Try to explain to M Renoir that a woman's torso is not a mass of decomposing flesh with green and purple spots that indicate the state of total putrefaction in a corpse!" Further, the painter Mary Cassatt wrote in 1913 that Renoir's art featured "enormously fat red women with very small heads." Too, art writer Richard Whiddington has noted, "When times got financially tough, [Renoir] backtracked and began painting saccharine, bourgeois portraits. It made him rich, an international star even. In short, he’s seen as a sellout."

In 2020, Geller planned to hold a similar protest during the Kimbell Art Museum's exhibit Renoir: The Body, The Senses.

=== Political analysis ===
The Forward wrote that the campaign was "one-third a joke about applying the language of political protest to art criticism, one-third a gleeful slaughter of sacred cows and one-third a serious argument about how high culture is defined and policed." Geller has said of RSAP, "In a Leninist tilt, I would say it's the first in the Long March towards addressing cultural hegemony, which is a long-term ambition of the movement. That's what cultural justice means to us." He has also said that RSAP is a movement "against the sort of polarized and absolutist nature of American discourse."

=== Chicago JNF protest & connection to anti-Zionist organizing ===
Geller has compared the media coverage RSAP has received to anti-Zionist protests he has participated in, When Geller traveled to Chicago for the AIC protest, he also participated in a protest at the Jewish National Fund's annual conference with a group of 250 people, organized by Jewish Voice for Peace and the International Jewish Anti-Zionist Network. During his WGN interview, he tried to draw the connection, saying, "I think when we let the free market dictate things, we get things like climate change," Geller responded. "We get things like the prison industrial complex, like Zionism and the destruction of sea otter habitats. The free market is not a barometer," but was interrupted by an anchor saying "Let's stick with Renoir, though."

== Other projects ==
Geller also uses Venmo transactions and memos as a form of comic performance, including a series of exchanges with Ben Affleck, charging and paying the actor small sums. He has been featured in a Vice Media documentary about Venmo and is participating in a project with documentary filmmaker Jess Pinkham.
